= 2010 Brantford municipal election =

2010 Brantford mayoral election
- October 25, 2010
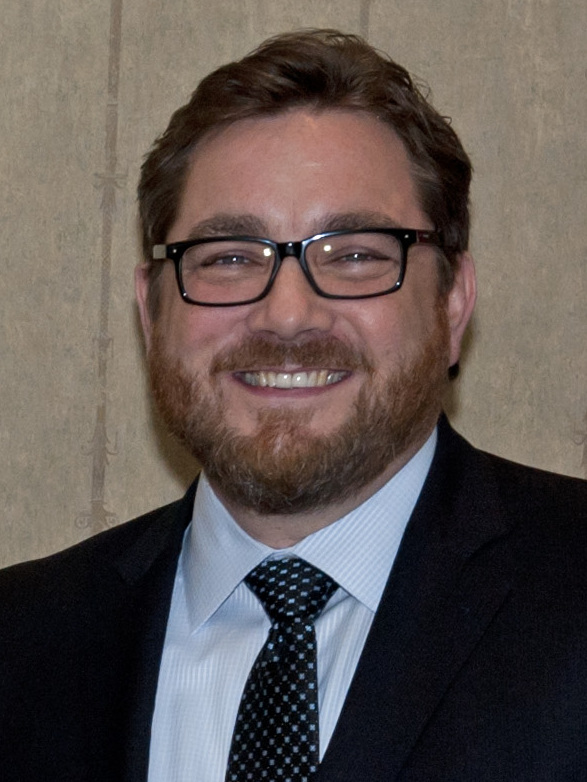

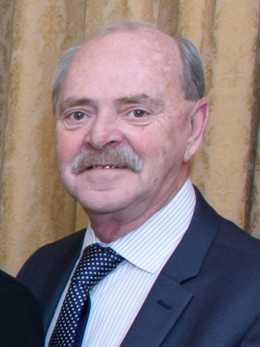
			ML
Candidate	Chris Friel	John Sless	Mark Littell
Popular vote	11,334	5,466	3,417
Percentage	41.80%	20.16%	12.60%
Mayor of Brantford before election
Mike Hancock
Elected Mayor of Brantford
Chris Friel

The 2010 Brantford municipal election was held on October 25, 2010, to elect a mayor, city councillors, and school trustees in the city of Brantford, Ontario.

== Results ==
2010 Brantford municipal election: Mayor of Brantford
Candidate	Votes	%
(x)Chris Friel	11,334	41.80
John Sless	5,466	20.16
Mark Littell	3,417	12.60
Dianne M. Austin	3,267	12.05
Mike Quattrociocchi	1,875	6.92
James Calnan	1,068	3.94
Richard E. Casey	495	1.83
Winston C. Ferguson	131	0.48
John Turmel	61	0.22
Total valid votes	27,114	100

- John Sless has worked at the Brantford Charity Casino and as an independent consultant. He ran for the Brantford city council in 1974 and 1976 and was defeated both times; on the latter occasion, he was backed by the United Auto Workers. He was elected for the city's second ward in 1991 and was re-elected in 1994, 1997, 2000, 2003, and 2006. Sless was regarded as an ally of mayor Chris Friel on council until the latter's defeat in 2003. He supported a long-term plan for downtown revitalization in 2002, was known as a supporter of sports and recreation programs, and in general opposed proposals for harsh cuts in municipal services. Some local writers have noted that Sless was a clear and articulate, but not a frequent speaker on council. He was the most prominent opponent of a plan to demolish several buildings on the south side of Colbourne Street in 2010; he argued that the demolition was not properly budgeted and that there was no plan for redevelopment.
- Mark Littell is a businessperson in Brantford. He is the founding chair of Brantford's Habitat for Humanity, has been president of the city's Rotary Club and Community Reserve Board, and has served on the Grand Erie Training and Adjustment Board. He also chaired the Brantford Airport Commission in the early 2000s. Littell was elected to the Brantford city council in 2006, winning a seat in the city's first ward. While on council, he chaired a city taskforce that recommended demolishing several buildings on the south side of Colborne Street. Littell argued that the buildings had blighted the community for several years, while opponents argued that they had historical and cultural value. Council endorsed demolition on June 7, 2010, and work crews began talking down the buildings the following day. Littell was fifty-five years old in the 2010 campaign and proposed integrating more services with Brant County in a bud to reduce property taxes.
- Dianne M. Austin was born in Etobicoke, Toronto and later moved to Norland to raise a family. She is a veteran community organizer. In the 1980s, she led in a public campaign against school closures. The campaign was initially targeted against the Victoria County Board of Education's decision to close five village schools in favour of larger, consolidated units. Later, she joined with other groups across the province to form a group called the Save Our Schools coalition. She herself was elected as a school trustee to the Victoria County board in the 1988 municipal election and sought to reduce the power of unelected directors of education. She was re-elected in 1991 and 1994. In 1995, Austin became executive director of Big Brothers and Big Sisters in Victoria-Haliburton. She was elected as reeve of Somerville Township in the 1997 municipal election; by virtue of this position, she also served as a regional councillor for Victoria County. She opposed her community's amalgamation into Kawartha Lakes in 2000. Austin moved to Peterborough shortly before her term ended and was appointed as chief executive officer of the Peterborough and District Association for Community Living, a group that assists people with developmental disabilities. In 2001, she led a campaign to ensure low-income disabled people would receive subsidized bus passes. She also oversaw the building of new group homes to provide greater privacy and independence. She later moved to Brantford, where she served as executive director of the Brant United Way from 2007 to 2009 and subsequently became a regional manager for the ALS Society of Ontario. She was fifty-four years old during the 2010 election and focused on targeting unemployment. Her campaign included both Liberal and Conservative organizers, although she stressed that she was not representing any party ideology.
- Mike Quattrociocchi was born and raised in Brantford and graduated in law and security from Mohawk College. He is a property developer and has been active with Habitat for Humanity. Before running for office, he was a citizen member of Brantford's community development committee. He sought election to the Brantford city council in 2000, at age thirty-two, and finished third in the city's first ward. He was elected on his second attempt in 2003 and was appointed to serve on the city's brownfields committee. Nominated for the Canadian Urban Institute's brownfield cleanup and redevelopment award in 2004, he lost to fellow Brantford councillor Marguerite Ceschi-Smith. He was appointed to the city's police services board and corporate services committee in December 2005. In 2006, he was one of two councillors to vote against maintaining a legacy account for Laurier Brantford. Quattrociocchi supported the Conservative Party of Canada in the 2006 federal election and was himself defeated in the 2006 municipal campaign. He became involved in a dispute with the Haudenosaunee Development Institute in 2007, over what he described as mafia-like extortion on a construction project he had started on disputed land (he has said that he attempted to contact the HDI several times before starting construction, and assumed when he did not receive a response that the project could go ahead). In the 2010 campaign, he focused on transparency in government.
- James Edward Taylor Calnan was born on November 24, 1967, in Picton, Ontario. He has Bachelor of Arts (1991) and Master of Arts (1993) degrees from the University of Waterloo and a Ph.D. from the University of Guelph (1999), all in History. He has taught at the University of Guelph and Laurier Brantford. Calnan was appointed to the Brantford Heritage Committee in 2001; he later chaired the committee and took part in efforts to preserve historical buildings. He also became active with an environment citizens' advisory group in 2002, after reports of groundwater contamination in his neighbourhood. Calnan first ran for Brantford city council in the 2003 municipal election. He finished third in the city's fourth ward. He was appointed to council in February 2006, after incumbent Dave Wrobel resigned for health reasons. (There is a tradition in Brantford of appointing the runner-up candidate to fill a vacancy on council. Some right-wing members of council unsuccessfully tried to appoint Alayne Sokoloski instead of Calnan.) Calnan was one of three councillors to vote against a grocery superstore and big-box outlet at Wayne Gretzky Parkway and Henry Street in April 2006. He was re-elected to a full term on council in the 2006 election and was the only councillor not to support a censure motion against the government of Ontario's Green Energy Act 2009, which shifted some powers away from municipalities. Calnan said that the censure motion sent the wrong message on environmental issues. In the 2010 mayoral race, he proposed an ambassador program to promote Brantford in other areas.
- Richard E. Casey was born and raised in Brantford. He was thirty-eight years old in March 2010. Before running for office, he worked in fire protection services and served on Brantford's cultural advisory and environmental policy advisory committees. During the 2010 campaign, he tried to encourage a higher turnout among younger voters. He was endorsed by the Brantford and District Labour Council.
- Winston C. Ferguson spent his early years in Waterford and moved to Brantford at age thirteen. A disability pension recipient, he has attended Brantford council meetings on a regular basis since 1980. He was a candidate for mayor in 2000, 2006, and 2010. Sixty-four years old in 2010, he called for a native casino, a new sports stadium, and a monorail to the Six Nations reserve near the city.

2010 Brantford municipal election: Councillor, Ward One (two members elected)
Candidate	Votes	%
Larry M. Kings	2,663	27.73
Jan C. Vander Stelt	2,040	21.24
Mary Ellen Kaye	1,616	16.82
Dev Lall	1,119	11.65
Brendan Davis	533	5.55
Jack N. Krantz	354	3.69
Sieg Holle	348	3.62
Lana N.A. Plank	300	3.12
Coralia E. Tudor	293	3.05
Richard Thomas Pikulski	201	2.09
Martin Sitko	138	1.44
Total valid votes	9,605	100

2010 Brantford municipal election: Councillor, Ward Two (two members elected)
Candidate	Votes	%
John K. Utley	2,982	29.18
(x)Vince Bucci	2,644	25.87
John Starkey	1,414	13.84
Mary F. O'Grady	1,261	12.34
Rick Wright	996	9.75
Scott D. Challe	494	4.83
James D. Ellis	428	4.19
Total valid votes	10,219	100

- Vince Bucci was raised in Sudbury, Ontario. He has a Bachelor of Arts degree from Laurentian University, attended Teacher's College at the University of Toronto, and worked toward a Master of Arts degree at McMaster University. He was a high school teacher in Sudbury and Dundas before moving to Brantford in 1971, where he taught at Pauline Johnson High School. He has also worked for many years at Immigrant Settlement and Counselling Services of Brant. He was elected to the Brant County Roman Catholic School Board in 1972 (after a recount) and was re-elected in 1974 and 1976. After three unsuccessful bids for city council in 1985, 1988, and 1991, he was elected for the city's second ward in 1994. He was re-elected in 1997 and 2000, but was defeated in 2003. He won the seat back in 2006 and was re-elected in 2010. Bucci has served as chair of Brantford's community development committee, as chair of the Brant County Board of Health, and as president of the St. Joseph's Hospital Foundation, and in 1999 he served on a committee that looked into issues relating to Brantford's casino. In the 2010 election, he called for the restoration of greyfield sites and the creation of a single economic area for Brantford, Brant County, and the local Six Nations community. Bucci is a member of the Liberal Party of Canada, and in 2003 he was the campaign manager for provincial Liberal candidate Dave Levac. In the 2004 federal election, he managed Lloyd St. Amand's campaign.
- John Starkey was born in Sault Ste. Marie, Ontario, spent part of his childhood in Hamilton, and moved to Brantford in 1967. He studied History and Philosophy at McMaster University before taking a job in Brantford. He became politically active in the late 1960s, supporting Progressive Conservative Party of Canada leader Robert Stanfield in 1968. Starkey continued to define himself as a Red Tory into the 2000s. Unlike some other Red Tories, he joined the Conservative Party of Canada after its establishment in 2003. He is a veteran municipal politician. After a failed bid in 1976, he was elected for Brantford's first council ward in 1978 and was re-elected in 1980, 1982, and 1985 before standing down after a serious injury from a car accident in 1988. At one stage in the 1980s, he was the only councillor to oppose the Market Square Mall. He returned to council in 1997 and served a further term. He was later elected for the city's fifth ward in 2003 and served three years before standing down again. He also ran for mayor in 1994 and 2000, losing both times. After his first departure from council, he wrote a municipal affairs column for the Brantford Expositor. He was a prominent opponent of Brantford's casino plan in the late 1990s, and noted the irony that he was both the sole Progressive Conservative on council and the strongest critic of Progressive Conservative Mike Harris's right-wing provincial government. He accused city hall of "corruption" after the 2000 campaign, charging that two of his properties were targeted for political reasons by the city's property standards commission. While campaigning in 2003, he called for Laurier Brantford to be transformed from a regional campus to a permanent university. Starkey was fifty-seven years old in 2010 and was working as a college instructor in business; in this campaign, he called for defending the integrity of established neighbourhoods.

2010 Brantford municipal election: Councillor, Ward Three (two members elected)
Candidate	Votes	%
(x)Dan McCreary	3,004	28.28
Debi Dignan-Rumble	2,816	26.51
(x)Greg Martin	2,709	25.51
Jang Panag	1,811	17.05
Lee Gustin	281	2.65
Total valid votes	10,621	100

- Debi Dignan-Rumble was born and raised in Brantford and has a diploma in recreation leadership from Mohawk College. The 2010 campaign was her first bid for public office; she had previously been a civilian member of Brantford's police services board, worked in project coordination with the Adult Recreation Therapy Centre, served as president of the Boys' and Girls' Club of Brantford, and fundraised for various local organizations.

2010 Brantford municipal election: Councillor, Ward Four (two members elected)
Candidate	Votes	%
(x)Richard Carpenter	3,045	35.34
Dave Wrobel	2,008	23.31
Cheryl L. Antoski	1,784	20.71
Andy Woodburn	1,241	14.40
Bob Brown	211	2.45
Mike Gomon	166	1.93
Rob L. Ferguson	161	1.87
Total valid votes	8,616	100

- Richard Carpenter began working as a letter carrier for Canada Post in 1974 and still held this position into the 2000s. He served on the Brantford Public Utilities Commission from 1991 to 1994 and was its chair in 1993. Carpenter was first elected to the Brantford city council in the 1994 municipal election and was re-elected in 1997, 2000, 2003, 2006 and 2010, finishing at the head of the polls each time. In his time in office, he has developed a reputation as both a strong constituency worker and a combative politician. In 1996, he spearheaded a motion to rename a municipal parkway after legendary ice hockey player Wayne Gretzky, who was born in Brantford. He warned against a shift to private utility ownership in 2001, after the city quietly eliminated the Brantford Hydro-Electric Commission; later, he welcomed a court decision that prevented the government of Ontario from selling a part of Ontario Hydro. In 2002, he supported Marguerite Ceschi-Smith's campaign to restore municipal brownfield space. He introduced a motion in 2003 that would have required the municipal government to hold a referendum before raising taxes; the motion was defeated. Carpenter considered seeking the Ontario Liberal Party nomination for Brant in the 1999 provincial election, but ultimately did not do so. He sought the Liberal Party of Canada nomination for the federal Brant division in the 2004 election, but lost to Lloyd St. Amand.
- Dave Wrobel has taught construction and carpentry at Mohawk College and worked as an accident benefits claims representative. Considered to be on the right wing of the political spectrum, he was a member of the Reform Party of Canada and the Canadian Alliance before winning election himself. He first ran for Brantford City Council in the 1997 municipal election; thirty-one years old during the campaign, he finished a relatively close third. He was elected in his second attempt in 2000; in this campaign, he called for Brantford casino revenues to be put in a reserve to reduce taxes and opposed using public funds to save private buildings. After the election, he emerged as a frequent opponent of Mayor Chris Friel and a regular ally of his ward-mate Richard Carpenter. In 2002, he offered support to Marguerite Ceschi-Smith's campaign for reclaiming brownfield sites. Wrobel supported Progressive Conservative candidate Alayne Sokoloski in the 2003 provincial election. He was himself re-elected in the 2003 municipal election. Wrobel was given a leave of absence for health reasons in early 2005. He joined with Carpenter and Ceschi-Smith in November 2005, refusing to attend a closed-door session on boundary adjustments and ethanol production; he said the issues were too important to be dealt with in private. He resigned his seat in February 2006 following continued health issues. With his health situation improved, he was re-elected to council in 2010.
- Andy Woodburn is an insurance broker. He represented Brantford's fourth ward on city council from 1976 to 1980 and again from 1982 to 1997. He finished a close second against Dave Neumann in the 1980 mayoral election, making tax cuts a central part of his campaign. He lost to Chris Friel by a more significant margin in a second mayoral bid in 1997. He later chaired Taxpayers Coalition Brant, a group described by one local columnist as "a gadfly group of about 40 right wing neo-conservatives." In 2003, he supported the provincial Progressive Conservative Party's proposal to force municipalities to hold referendums before enacting tax increases; the Progressive Conservatives lost the 2003 provincial election, and the measure was never brought forward. Woodburn has attempted to return to council in 2000, 2003 (running in ward three), and 2010, without success. His brother, Mike Woodburn, was also elected to city council in 1978 and served for one term.

2010 Brantford municipal election: Councillor, Ward Five (two members elected)
Candidate	Votes	%
(x)Marguerite Ceschi-Smith	2,345	32.11
Dave Neumann	1,206	16.52
Dwight A. Ayerhart	1,102	15.09
(x)John K. Bradford	867	11.87
Tim Philp	765	10.48
Stephen C. Morris	599	8.20
Chris Markell	311	4.26
Donald R. Haddow	107	1.47
Total valid votes	7,302	100

- Dwight A. Ayerhart was born and raised in Brantford. He is the former owner of a restaurant and bar called the Creamery Pub. Before running for municipal office, he chaired the Canadian Auto Workers Local 397 for eight years. He has sought election to city council in 2003, 2006, and 2010, without success. To his first bid for office, he called for an incentive plan based on casino revenues to benefit the Eagle Place region of Brantford. He highlighted job creation in 2010, which earned him an endorsement from the Brantford and District Labour Council.
- John K. Bradford is a retired educator with a background in television broadcasting. He worked on the set of the show, Hilarious House of Frightenstein, in 1972 and taught broadcasting at Mohawk College beginning in the late 1970s. He has also owned a diving store in Brantford and a post-production facility in Ottawa. He was president of the Broadcast Educators' Association of Canada in the early 1990s and has also served on the boards of the Brantford General Hospital and the Rotary Club of Brantford. Bradford is a member of the Liberal Party of Canada and nominated Jane Stewart for the party's nomination in Brant in the buildup to the 2000 federal election. He was elected to the Brantford City Council in 2006 on a platform that highlighted community planning principles, tackling greyfields, and finishing up the cleanup of brownfields. He was suspended without pay for ninety days in 2009, following harassment complaints by a staff member who had been involved in an interpersonal situation with a member of Bradford's family. Bradford acknowledged that he had created an inappropriate situation, accepted the punishment, and said that the matter was isolated and should not reflect on his entire performance as a councillor. He sought re-election in 2010, highlighting the need to re-develop the downtown. The target of an anonymous smear campaign, he finished fourth in the two-member ward.
- Tim Philp is a local political commentator who wrote an opinion column in the Brantford Expositor and ran a television program called Talk Local on Rogers Cable. He also has a background in electronics engineering and was a founder of Brant Freenet. Philp was known as a vocal critic of incumbent councillor John Bradford, and during the 2010 campaign he called for greater openness in government. He had previously sought election for Brantford's fifth ward in the 2000 municipal election, finishing third.
- Stephen C. Morris identified as a construction welder and landlord. He called for fiscal restraint and greater caution in approving capital projects, and criticized the handling of Brantford's Greenwich-Mohawk brownfield. He also pledged not accept a wage if elected as a councillor.
- Chris Markell was fifty-two years old at the time of the election. A consultant, he had more than twenty-five years of experience in areas such as health and safety. He called for a focus on growth and development and a plan to keep young people in Brantford.
- Donald R. Haddow was born in Brantford and worked at Domtar for twenty-three years before its closure in the mid-1990s. He was sixty-two years old at the time of the election and worked as a shipper and receiver. During the election, he promoted the idea of an expanded green corridor.

Source for election results: Official results, City of Brantford.
