= Conservative Party of Canada candidates in the 2004 Canadian federal election =

The Conservative Party of Canada ran a full slate of candidates in the 2004 federal election, and won 99 seats out of 308 to form the Official Opposition. Many of the party's candidates have their own biography pages; information about others may be found here.

== Newfoundland and Labrador ==
=== Rick Dalton (Avalon) ===
Dalton received 9,173 votes (29.3%), losing to the region's incumbent, John Efford.

=== Wynanne Downer (Humber—St. Barbe—Baie Verte) ===
Wynanne Downer lost to incumbent Gerry Byrne of the Liberal Party of Canada. Downer received 6,538 votes to Byrne's 17,820.

Downer sat on the Corner Brook City Council following there local election in September 2005 serving until she died of cancer in July 2007.

=== Merrill Strachan (Labrador) ===
Strachan lost to Lawrence D. O'Brien of the Liberal Party of Canada, receiving 1,400 votes to O'Brien's 5,524.

=== Larry Peckford (Random—Burin—St. George's) ===
Larry Peckford lost to Bill Matthews of the Liberal Party of Canada, receiving 4,820 votes to Matthews's 12,383. He is the younger brother of former Newfoundland premier Brian Peckford.

=== Norman Doyle (St. John's North) ===
Norman Doyle defeated Walter Noel of the Liberal Party of Canada, receiving 15,073 votes to Noel's 13,343. Doyle is a former member of the Newfoundland and Labrador House of Assembly serving from 1979 until 1993. Doyle was later appointed to the senate by Prime Minister Stephen Harper (2011)

=== Loyola Hearn (St. John's South—Mount Pearl) ===
Loyola Hearn defeated Siobhan Coady of the Liberal Party of Canada, receiving 13,330 votes to Coady's 11,879. Hearn formerly represented St. John's West in the House of Commons and is a former member of the Newfoundland and Labrador House of Assembly. Hearn was later appointed Canadian ambassador to Ireland (2010)

== Prince Edward Island ==
=== Peter McQuaid (Cardigan) ===
Peter McQuaid lost to Lawrence MacAulay of the Liberal Party of Canada. McQuaid received 6,889 votes to MacAulay's 11,064. McQuaid was long-time Chief of Staff for PEI premier Pat Binns

== Nova Scotia ==
=== Michael MacDonald (Dartmouth—Cole Harbour) ===
MacDonald finished third. The winner was Michael Savage of the Liberal Party of Canada. MacDonald received 8,739 votes to Savage's 17,425.

== Quebec ==
=== Argenteuil—Mirabel: David H. McArthur ===
David H. McArthur was an executive at the machinery company S.A. McLernon Inc. from 1995 to 2007. He later worked as a consultant and a director for an airline catering business. He received 3,460 votes (7.04%) in 2004, finishing third against Bloc Québécois incumbent Mario Laframboise. After the election, he was president of the Conservative Party riding association in Vaudreuil—Soulanges.

In 2009, McArthur was hired as special assistant to Chuck Strahl, the federal Minister of Indian Affairs and Northern Development. He was promoted to chief of staff in August 2010, when John Duncan was appointed as Strahl's successor.

=== Brome—Missisquoi: Peter Stastny ===
Peter Stastny is a businessman from Sutton Township, Quebec. A former co-owner of the Emporium store in Knowlton, he has also managed the Mont Glen ski resort and been president of the Brome Lake Chamber of Commerce. Before running for federal office, he promoted a tourist train project in Brome—Missisquoi. He was the mayor of Sutton Township from 1993 to 1997 and supported a merger with the neighbouring town of Sutton. In the 1997 municipal election, he lost to an anti-merger candidate. The Quebec government forced the two communities to merge in 2002.

Stastny was a Liberal until 2004, when he joined the Conservatives to run as the party's candidate in Brome—Missisquoi. Ironically, he was still on the Liberal Party's membership list when the election took place. He was fifty years old at the time and was chair of the Eastern Townships Community Economic Development and Employability Committee. During the election, he proposed to eliminate campaign signs on ecological grounds. Considered a strong candidate for the Conservatives in Quebec, he received 4,888 votes (11.05%) for a third-place finish against Liberal incumbent Denis Paradis.

Stastny's family is of Slovak origin, and he is a distant relative of the former hockey player and current member of the European Parliament named Peter Stastny.

=== Richelieu: Daniel-A. Proulx ===
Daniel-A. Proulx has a diploma in administration from the University of Montreal. He was an administrator from 1999 to 2003 and later started a computer concepts firm. He has also been president of the Metropolitan Sorel-Tracy Chamber of Industry and Commerce. During the 2004 election, he acknowledged that the Conservative Party had only a minimal presence in his riding. He received 3,726 votes (7.65%), finishing third against Bloc Québécois incumbent Louis Plamondon.

== Ontario ==
=== Brampton—Springdale: Sam Hundal ===
Sulakhan Singh (Sam) Hundal (born 1940) holds a Bachelor of Arts degree and a Bachelor of Teaching degree from Punjab University, a Commonwealth graduate's teaching certificate from the School of Education at the University of Leicester, and a Master of Arts degree in political science from the University of Windsor. He works as a real-estate agent and language interpreter. Hundal has been involved in several Brampton community organizations since moving to the city in the mid-1970s, and participated in the 1996 Team Mission trade mission to South Asia. He received a Governor General's 125th Commemorative Canada Medal in 1992, and was granted an Outstanding Contribution Recognition Certificate from the premier of Ontario in 1994.

Hundal campaigned for the Brampton City Council in 1982, but was defeated. He was originally a member of the Liberal Party, and in 1990 challenged sitting Member of Provincial Parliament (MPP) Carman McClelland for the Ontario Liberal Party nomination in Brampton North. Hundal charged that McClelland was ignoring the concerns of Brampton's Sikh community. McClelland denied this, and noted that over 550 party members from Brampton North's Sikh community supported his renomination. McClelland won the challenge, 1,002 votes to 827, in a contest that was marked by open hostility between the candidates.

Hundal later ran for the Progressive Conservative Party of Canada in Brampton Centre in the 1997 federal election, and finished third against Liberal candidate Sarkis Assadourian. He was chosen as the Conservative Party's candidate in 2004 after it was discovered that Gurjit Grewal, the party's original nominee, had faced an assault charge in the early 1990s. He received 11,182 votes (27.53%), finishing second against Liberal candidate Ruby Dhalla.

=== Brant: Greg Martin ===
Greg Martin is a professional firefighter. As of 2010, he had served twenty-five years with Toronto Fire Services and held the rank of captain. He was a member of the Brantford city council from 2000 to 2010, representing the third ward.

After a failed bid in 1997, Martin was elected to council at age forty in the 2000 municipal election, defeating former mayor Bob Taylor for the ward's second seat. He was re-elected in 2003 and 2006, but lost in 2010. Martin became vice-chair of the health board in 2002 and later chaired the corporate services committee and the Wayne Gretzky Sports Centre expansion work group. He attempted to replace Marguerite Ceschi-Smith as chair of the city's brownfield committee in 2004, but was defeated.

Generally, Martin was known as a fiscal conservative. He was the only councillor to vote against a twenty-year downtown revitalization plan in 2002, saying that the region had already received too much money. He was also the only councillor to vote against sending a trade delegation to Italy in 2005, and the following year he was one of two councillors to vote against continuing a grant to Laurier Brantford. Martin sat on the Finance Committee for most of his time on Brantford City Council and as chair, ushered in a service review program for city departments. He was successful in getting council to agree to a set time hiring freeze of municipal employees to help minimize property tax increases. He was also a proponent of intensive line-by-line study of operational and capital budgets during annual budget deliberations by council.

Martin served a one-year term as president of Brant's Reform Party of Canada association in the 1990s. He opposed the party's United Alternative initiative in 1999, but nonetheless joined the resultant Canadian Alliance party in 2000. The Alliance merged with the Progressive Conservative Party of Canada to form the Conservative Party in 2003, and Martin joined the new party. He was neutral in its 2004 leadership election. Martin also served on the executive of the local Progressive Conservative Party of Ontario association and chaired the group Taxpayers Coalition Brant. He frequently wrote letters to the Brantford Expositor before his election to council, advocating conservative policies.

Martin called for referendums on abortion and the death penalty as part of his platform for the 2004 Federal election. He received 17,792 votes (33.10%), finishing second against Liberal candidate Lloyd St. Amand. He sought the Conservative nomination again for the 2006 federal election, but lost to Phil McColeman.

Electoral record
Election	Division	Party	Votes	%	Place	Winner/s
1997 municipal	Brantford City Council, Ward Three	n/a	951	8.31	5/5	Bob Taylor and Mike Hancock
2000 municipal	Brantford City Council, Ward Three	n/a	3,593	30.33	2/3	Mike Hancock and himself
2003 municipal	Brantford City Council, Ward Three	n/a	3,511	34.67	1/6	himself and Dan McCreary
2004 federal	Brant	Conservative	17,792	33.10	2/6	Lloyd St. Amand, Liberal
2006 municipal	Brantford City Council, Ward Three	n/a	3,123	29.37	2/5	Dan McCreary and himself
2010 municipal	Brantford City Council, Ward Three	n/a	2,709	25.51	3/5	Dan McCreary and Debi Dignan-Rumble

=== Eglinton—Lawrence: Bernie Tanz ===
Tanz is a graduate of York Mills Collegiate, attended the University of California, and is a real estate developer in private life. He joined the Progressive Conservative Party in 1994, and joined the Conservative Party after its merger with the Canadian Alliance. Tanz campaigned for a seat on the East York municipal council in 1994 at age 37, calling for greater cooperation between the public and private sectors. He was narrowly defeated for the second position by Tim Cholvat.

In 1999, the Ontario government of Mike Harris sold a prime downtown Toronto property unit at half of its market value to All-City Storage, a California-based firm on which Tanz served as a director. The sale was subsequently the subject of an investigation by The Globe and Mail newspaper. Tanz described himself as an inactive director, and said that he knew nothing about the situation.

Tanz finished second against Joe Volpe in 2004. He unsuccessfully campaigned to succeed Jane Pitfield as the representative for Toronto's 26th ward in the 2006 municipal election.

Electoral record
Election	Division	Party	Votes	%	Place	Winner/s
1994 East York municipal	Council, Fourth Ward	-	2,411	17.71	3/5	Lorna Krawchuk and Tim Cholvat
2004 federal	Eglinton—Lawrence	Conservative	11,792	25.05	2/5	Joe Volpe, Liberal

=== Hamilton Centre: Leon Patrick O'Connor ===
O'Connor is an educational assistant, and was 58 years old in 2004 (Hamilton Spectator, 21 June 2004). He is a First Nations Canadian, and has campaigned in support of native issues and concerns.

He was originally a member of the Liberal Party, and worked with Sheila Copps in several campaigns. He left the Liberals to join the Canadian Alliance in 2000, claiming that the Liberal Party had become arrogant in office (Canadian Press, 2 June 2000). O'Connor campaigned for the Alliance in the 2000 campaign. On one occasion, he was targeted by threatening fax sent to his home address comparing his party to the Nazis and leader Stockwell Day to Adolf Hitler (Spectator, 20 November 2000).

O'Connor later sought the Progressive Conservative nomination for Hamilton West in the 2003 provincial election, losing to Doug Brown (Spectator, 22 February 2003).

The Canadian Alliance merged with the federal Progressive Conservative Party in early 2004 to create the Conservative Party of Canada. O'Connor supported the new party, and ran as its candidate in Hamilton Centre. He also registered for a municipal by-election in Hamilton's second ward in 2004, but withdrew before nominations closed (Spectator, 26 August 2004).

O'Connor is a moderate on some social issues, and is pro-choice on abortion (Spectator, 8 June 2004). He campaigned for the Conservative nomination in Hamilton Centre for the 2006 election, but lost to Eliot Hill (Spectator, 13 May 2005).

Electoral record
Election	Division	Party	Votes	%	Place	Winner
2003 provincial	Hamilton West	Alliance	7,295		2/10	Stan Keyes, Liberal
2004 federal	Hamilton Centre	Conservative	6,714	15.13	3/7	David Christopherson, New Democratic Party

=== Kingston and the Islands: Blair MacLean ===
MacLean received 12,582 votes (23.12%), finishing second against Liberal incumbent Peter Milliken.

=== Mississauga East—Cooksville: Riina DeFaria ===
DeFaria was the Conservative Party of Canada candidate for the riding of Mississauga East—Cooksville in the 2004 Canadian federal election. DeFeria also ran in the 2000 Canadian federal election in the riding of Mississauga East for the Progressive Conservative Party of Canada finishing a close third behind Jainstien Dookie of the Canadian Alliance and the winner Albina Guarnieri of the Liberal Party of Canada.

=== Nickel Belt: Mike Dupont ===
Mike Dupont is a businessman and professional photographer in the Sudbury area. He was employed in mining from 1977 to 1987, when he started his own photography firm. He has chaired the Greater Sudbury Chamber of Commerce, and was appointed to the city's police services board in 2004.

Dupont was a member of the Progressive Conservative Party of Canada before 2003, when he supported the party's merger with the Canadian Alliance to create the Conservative Party of Canada. He originally sought the Conservative nomination for the Sudbury riding in the 2004 election, but lost to Stephen L. Butcher. He later won the party nomination in Nickel Belt. He finished third against Ray Bonin, and commented that the riding's labour base made it impossible for the Conservatives to win.

Dupont won a community enhancement award later in 2004. He ran for the Greater Sudbury Municipal Council in the 2006 election, but was defeated.

Electoral record
Election	Division	Party	Votes	%	Place	Winner
2004 federal	Nickel Belt	Conservative	7,628		3/7	Ray Bonin, Liberal
2006 municipal	Greater Sudbury council, Ward Three	n/a	1,167		2/3	Claude Berthiaume

=== Parry Sound-Muskoka: Keith Montgomery ===
Keith C. Montgomery was born in Gravenhurst. He has a Bachelor of Arts degree in economics (1978), worked as a real-estate broker in Muskoka for fourteen years, and became a financial consultant with the Investors Group in 1996. He is a member of the United Church of Canada.

A longtime member of the Progressive Conservative Party of Ontario, Montgomery was Premier Frank Miller's campaign manager in the 1985 provincial election. He first ran for public office in the 2000 federal election as a candidate of the Progressive Conservative Party of Canada. When the federal Progressive Conservatives later merged with the more right-wing Canadian Alliance in 2003, Montgomery joined the resultant Conservative Party of Canada.

Montgomergy finished second against federal cabinet minister Andy Mitchell in 2004. He sought the Conservative Party nomination again for the 2006 federal election, but lost to Tony Clement.

He was appointed to a seven-year term on the Competition Tribunal of Canada on November 5, 2009.

Electoral record
Election	Division	Party	Votes	%	Place	Winner
2000 federal	Parry Sound-Muskoka	Progressive Conservative	7,055	18.72	3/5	Andy Mitchell, Liberal
2004 federal	Parry Sound-Muskoka	Conservative	15,970	36.35	2/4	Andy Mitchell, Liberal

=== Peterborough: James Jackson ===
James Jackson worked in real estate and real estate development, and owned a bed and breakfast in Peterborough. He served as director of the Greater Peterborough Area Economic Development Corporation and Peterborough and the Kawarthas Tourism. He supported Sylvia Sutherland's 2003 campaign for re-election as mayor of Peterborough.

Jackson planned to run for the Canadian Alliance nomination in the buildup to the 2004 election before that party merged with the Progressive Conservatives to create the Conservative Party. He supported the merger and eventually defeated two other candidates to win the Conservative nomination. He expressed some socially conservative views in this period, saying that he was anti-abortion and opposed same-sex marriage. He supported Stephen Harper in the 2004 Conservative leadership contest.

He was fifty-six years old at the time of the 2004 election. He received 18,393 votes (31.92%) on election day, finishing second against Liberal incumbent Peter Adams. Jackson sought the Conservative nomination again in the buildup to the 2006 federal election, but narrowly lost to Dean Del Mastro. There were rumours that Jackson would run for mayor of Peterborough in the 2006 municipal elections, but he ultimately did not do so. Jackson suffered a fatal heart attack in 2011.

=== St. Catharines: Leo Bonomi ===
Bonomi was born in St. Catharines. He holds a Bachelor of Arts degree in history and Political Science from the University of Western Ontario, and has taken business and commerce training at the University of Windsor. He works as an investment advisor in the Niagara region for BMO Nesbitt Burns, and has been a member of the Knights of Columbus for over thirty-five years. Bonomi was 53 years old in 2004.

Bonomi defeated Cam Leach to win the Conservative nomination for St. Catharines. The Conservative Party targeted the riding, and Bonomi was favoured by some to win. Instead, he finished second against Liberal incumbent Walt Lastewka with 18,261 votes (34.71%).

=== Scarborough Southwest: Heather Jewell ===
Jewell was born in 1962, and has a Bachelor of Arts degree in psychology from York University. At the time of the election, she was head of the Condition of Broadcast License Closed-Captioning Department at Alliance Atlantis Communications. Her campaign website featured four-minute power ballad campaign anthem, composed by Rob Wells. The song included the lines, "Scarborough Southwest/is entitled to the very best/an inspired member of Parliament/who will champion our interests/and uphold our aspirations/in the nation's capital.... Oh you know it's Heather Jewell" (National Post, 23 June 2004).

Jewell received 9,028 votes (23.78%), finishing second against Liberal incumbent Tom Wappel.

=== Thornhill: Josh Cooper ===
Josh Cooper was the Conservative Party of Canada candidate for Member of Parliament in 2004 representing Thornhill, Ontario.

He had won the nomination for the Canadian Alliance. After the merger of the Alliance and the Progressive Conservative Party of Canada, he was renominated.

Cooper is the executive director of the CJPAC. He is also owner of Par Golf Camp, and involved with the UJA Federation. He lost the election to Liberal candidate Susan Kadis by over 10,000 votes.

=== Toronto—Danforth: Loftus Cuddy ===
Cuddy holds Bachelor of Arts and Bachelor of Laws degrees from the University of Toronto. He worked in defence insurance litigation for a year after his graduation, but switched to the plaintiff's side. For fifteen years before the 2004 election, he operated a practice in Toronto representing the interests of working-class people. He often worked pro bono in cases relating to social policy issues. Cuddy has been active in organizations such as the Royal Canadian Legion, the Holocaust Education Week Committee, and the Toronto Youth Symphony. He was baptized as John Cuddy, but changed his name at age thirteen after becoming inspired by the writings of his great-great-grandfather, a Toronto minister.

Cuddy is the older brother of Jim Cuddy, the guitarist and vocalist of the rock group Blue Rodeo. His brother declined to endorse Loftus's campaign. This was not based on personal animosity, but because the younger Cuddy considered the Conservative Party to be too far to the right (The Globe and Mail, 26 May 2004).

Loftus Cuddy was on the left wing of his party, and endorsed same-sex marriage during the 2004 election. He received 2,975 votes (6.21%), finishing third against New Democratic Party leader Jack Layton.

=== Whitby—Oshawa: Ian MacNeil ===
MacNeil was born in Antigonish, Nova Scotia. He has a bachelor's degree in business administration from St. Francis Xavier University, and a Master of Business Administration degree from the University of Bradford. He is a banker, and has served as an assistant to the minister of international trade. He moved to Oshawa in 1998, and was thirty-six years old at the time of the election (Toronto Star, 29 June 2004).

Whitby—Oshawa was a targeted seat for the Conservatives, but MacNeil was nonetheless defeated by Liberal incumbent Judi Longfield. He received 20,531 votes (36.06%).

=== Windsor West: Jordan Katz ===
Katz was born in Windsor, Ontario, and was 32 years old at the time of the election. He studied economics at the University of Windsor, although he began working as a pit boss at Casino Windsor before completing his degree. He has also worked as a hotel chef (Windsor Star, 25 May 2004), and is active with the Windsor Jewish Federation and the Canada Israel Committee. He won the Conservative nomination over Greg Novini in late March 2004 (Windsor Star, 1–2 April 2004).

A Windsor Star poll taken during the campaign showed Katz with a narrow lead over New Democratic Party incumbent Brian Masse, although the reliability of the poll was disputed (5 & 11 June 2004). A subsequent poll showed him in third place (Windsor Star, 12 June 2004). Katz finished third against Masse with 8,348 votes (18.91%).

Katz is Jewish, and may have been the victim of anti-semitic vandalism during the campaign when some of his signs were spray-painted with swastikas. It is not clear if the vandalism was directed against Katz on a personal level or against the Conservative Party (signs belonging to Conservative candidate Rick Fuschi, who is not Jewish, were similarly defaced in a neighbouring riding. (Windsor Star, 15 June 2004).

== Manitoba ==
=== Bill Archer (Churchill) ===
Archer was born in 1957 in Saskatchewan and attended Winnipeg Bible College in the 1970s. He received a Bachelor of Laws degree from the University of Manitoba in 1991, and became a partner with the Archer & Phillips Law Office in 1993.

Archer volunteered for Progressive Conservative candidate Cecil Thorne for the 1999 provincial election in the northern election division of Thompson, and was himself was the party's candidate in 2003. He worked as his own campaign manager, and campaigned against the taxation rates charged by local school boards.

Electoral record
Election	Division	Party	Votes	%	Place	Winner
2003 provincial	Thompson	Progressive Conservative	532		2/3	Steve Ashton, New Democratic Party
2004 federal	Churchill	Conservative	2,999	15.13	3/4	Bev Desjarlais, New Democratic Party

=== Bryan McLeod (Elmwood—Transcona) ===
McLeod received 7,644 votes (26.11%), finishing second against New Democratic Party incumbent Bill Blaikie.

=== Kris Stevenson (Winnipeg North) ===
Stevenson was born to a Peguis Nation family in Steelier, Manitoba, was raised in Selkirk and now lives in Winnipeg. He has extensive experience working in aboriginal youth programs. Stevenson was employed with the Department of Indian and Northern Affairs as a Communications Assistant at the time of the election, and has worked related organizations such as Shabbiest Waking Aboriginal Head Start and the Manitoba Child and Family Services. He has also been an athlete and coach in north Winnipeg, and was working toward a degree in education at the University of Winnipeg at the time of the election.

Stevenson was one of three aboriginal candidates to run for the Conservative Party in the 2004 election (National Post, 15 July 2004). He received 3,186 votes (12.27%), finishing third against New Democratic Party incumbent Judy Wasylycia-Leis.
