= Bob Taylor (Ontario politician) =

Canadian politician

Mayor of Brantford, Ontario
- In office 1991–1994
- Preceded by: Karen George
- Succeeded by: Chris Friel

Brantford City Councillor, Ward Two with Kevin Davis
- In office 1990–1991
- Preceded by: Brad Ward
- Succeeded by: John Sless and Bob Lancaster

Brantford City Councillor, Ward Three with Mike Hancock
- In office 1997–2000
- Preceded by: Max Sherman
- Succeeded by: Greg Martin

Personal details
- Born: Saskatchewan

Bob Taylor is a politician in the Canadian province of Ontario. He was the mayor of Brantford from 1991 to 1994 and served as a city councillor on two separate occasions.

== Early life and career ==
Taylor was born in northern Saskatchewan, the son of a United Church of Canada minister. He later moved to London, Ontario, where one of his first political activities was working as campaign manager for David Suzuki in a student election. He holds Bachelor of Arts, Bachelor of Physical Education, and Master of Education degrees and has worked as an elementary school principal.

Originally a Liberal, Taylor joined the New Democratic Party in the 1970s to support Brant Member of Parliament (MP) Derek Blackburn. He rejoined the Liberals in the 1980s and supported Ontario Liberal Party candidate Dave Neumann in the 1987 provincial election.

Taylor was a member of the Brantford Public Utilities Commission for ten years before his first appointment to city council in 1990.

== Municipal politician ==
Taylor was appointed to the Brantford City Council in 1990 as a replacement for Brad Ward, who was required to resign his seat after winning election to the Legislative Assembly of Ontario.

After serving on council for one year, Taylor was elected as Brantford's mayor in the 1991 municipal election over one-term incumbent Karen George. The election was expected to be close, but Taylor won by a significant margin. In 1993, he supported an abortive proposal by Bob Rae's provincial government to shift some public sector jobs from Toronto to Brantford. When Rae's government cancelled the initiative, Taylor led a protest delegation to Queen's Park. He lost to challenger Chris Friel in the 1994 municipal election.

Taylor returned to city council in 1997, winning an open seat in Brantford's third ward. Over the next three years, he served on the city's corporate services, social services, and community development committees and was part of a special committee examining issues relating to the opening of the Brantford Charity Casino. He criticized Friel's efforts to amalgamate Brantford with Brant County in 2000, describing the mayor's style as heavy-handed. Taylor was narrowly defeated in his bid for re-election in the 2000 municipal election.

He supported Mike Hancock's successful bid to become mayor of Brantford in 2003 and was co-chair of Liberal MP Lloyd St. Amand's successful re-election campaign in the 2006 federal election.

== Electoral record ==
2000 Brantford municipal election: Councillor, Ward Three (two members elected)
Candidate	Votes	%
(x)Mike Hancock	4,793	40.46
Greg Martin	3,593	30.33
(x)Bob Taylor	3,459	29.20
Total valid votes	11,845	100

1997 Brantford municipal election: Councillor, Ward Three (two members elected)
Candidate	Votes	%
Bob Taylor	3,940	34.43
(x)Mike Hancock	3,540	30.94
Fred Minna	1,609	14.06
Cam Gillespie	1,402	12.25
Greg Martin	951	8.31
Total valid votes	11,442	100

- See the 1997 Brantford election page for information on Gillespie.

1994 Brantford municipal election: Mayor of Brantford
Candidate	Votes	%
Chris Friel	10,695	41.97
(x)Bob Taylor	7,631	29.95
Bob Lancaster	3,981	15.62
John Starkey	1,754	6.88
Dan McCreary	1,094	4.29
Chuck Giles	325	1.28
Total valid votes	25,480	100

- See the 1994 Brantford election page for information on Lancaster.

1991 Brantford municipal election: Mayor of Brantford
Candidate	Votes	%
Bob Taylor	13,561	56.06
(x)Karen George	6,200	25.63
Pat Luciani	3,598	14.88
William Stewart	829	3.43
Total valid votes	24,188	100

- See the 1991 Brantford election page for information on Luciani.
