= 1997 Brantford municipal election =

The 1997 Brantford municipal election was held on November 10, 1997, to elect a mayor, councillors, and school trustees in the city of Brantford, Ontario. Some of the rural and small-town communities outside of Brantford also held elections on the same day.

Chris Friel was easily re-elected as mayor of Brantford, defeating right-wing challenger Andy Woodburn.

== Results ==
1997 Brantford municipal election: Mayor of Brantford
Candidate	Votes	%
(x)Chris Friel	18,442	67.83
Andy Woodburn	5,521	20.31
Wayne Barlett	1,600	5.89
Joseph Robert Gallant	1,174	4.32
Patrick Clement	450	1.66
Total valid votes	27,187	100

- Wayne Barlett was a first-time candidate in 1997. He has served on Brantford's economic development board.
- Patrick Clement (born September 9, 1949) was a first-time candidate in 1997. He intended to run for mayor a second time in 2000, but was informed that he could not do so because he had not filed an expenses report for the 1997 campaign. Clement had planned to run on a platform of reducing taxes and pursuing an anti-poverty strategy and described his disqualification as a prejudicial act.

1997 Brantford municipal election: Councillor, Ward One (two members elected)
Candidate	Votes	%
(x)Paul Urbanowicz	1,829	20.30
John Starkey	1,348	14.96
Larry Kings	1,345	14.93
(x)Jo Brennan	1,202	13.34
Nevada Adams	1,195	13.26
Ron MacKinnon	1,048	11.63
Dan DiSabatino	892	9.90
Richard Pikulski	152	1.69
Total valid votes	9,011	100

1997 Brantford municipal election: Councillor, Ward Two (two members elected)
Candidate	Votes	%
(x)John Sless	3,332	31.97
(x)Vince Bucci	3,059	29.35
Ted Oliver	2,312	22.18
Jeff Coles	1,720	16.50
Total valid votes	10,423	100

1997 Brantford municipal election: Councillor, Ward Three (two members elected)
Candidate	Votes	%
Bob Taylor	3,940	34.43
(x)Mike Hancock	3,540	30.94
Fred Minna	1,609	14.06
Cam Gillespie	1,402	12.25
Greg Martin	951	8.31
Total valid votes	11,442	100

- Cam Gillespie has served on the boards of the Brantford General Hospital, the Brantford Community Services Advisory Board, and the Brantford Parks, Recreation and Waterfront Advisory Committee. In 1999, he wrote that revenues from the Brantford Charity Casino should be put in a reserve fund against future property tax increases.

1997 Brantford municipal election: Councillor, Ward Four (two members elected)
Candidate	Votes	%
(x)Richard Carpenter	3,375	44.82
Dave Wrobel	1,631	21.04
Kyle Giles	1,299	17.04
Pat Franklin	699	9.01
Robert Rutledge	617	8.09
Total valid votes	7,621	100

1997 Brantford municipal election: Councillor, Ward Five (two members elected)
Candidate	Votes	%
(x)Wally Lucente	2,466	33.65
(x)Marguerite Ceschi-Smith	2,168	29.58
George W. Karmiris	1,179	16.09
Dale Renout	806	11.00
Robert Corby	366	4.99
Ron Rattie	344	4.69
Total valid votes	7,329	100

- George W. Karmiris is a real estate broker and has chaired the Brantford Regional Real Estate Association. He wrote a public letter criticizing the Ontario Liberal Party during the 1999 provincial election. He was barred from running in the 2000 municipal election after not filing an expenses return for 1997.
- Robert Corby was a first-time political candidate. He was barred from running in the 2000 election after not filing an expenses return for 1997.
- Ron Rattie has been active with disability issues in Brantford. He has chaired Brantford's Operation Lift program and co-chaired the Brantford Equal Access Team, and was a peer support coordinator of the Canadian Paraplegic Association of Ontario. He himself was involved in a car accident in 1981 that resulted in his becoming a quadriplegic. Rattie was named as Brantford's Citizen of the Year in 2002 and served on the board that chose his successor in 2003. In June 2003, he wrote a public letter criticizing excessive political correctness in the language around disability issues.

Source: "City Council," Brantford Expositor, 8 November 2000, D4.

== Surrounding communities ==
In 1998, the newly amalgamated community of Brant County (outside of Brantford) held a special municipal election to elect a mayor and councillors.

Veteran politician Ron Eddy was elected as mayor.

1998 Brant municipal election: Councillor, Ward Fourteen
Candidate	Votes	%
Bob VanSickle	397	58.99
Jim Ritchie	217	32.24
William Stewart	59	8.77
Total valid votes	673	100

- William (Bill) Stewart (died January 5, 2000) was the reeve of Onondaga Township from 1951 to 1957. He later became a perennial candidate for public office, running for reeve of Onondaga in 1972 and 1974 and for mayor of Brantford in 1978, 1982, 1985, 1988, and 1991 (there may also have been other candidacies). He came within seven votes of winning in 1972, but in every election thereafter he lost by a significant margin. Described as a "down-to-earth farmer," Stewart was outspoken on many issues, including what he believed was high taxation. On one occasion, he recommended removing all parking meters from Brantford's downtown. The 1998 election seems to have been his last bid for public office. He died in 2000, at age seventy-nine.
