= 1991 Brantford municipal election =

The 1991 Brantford municipal election was held on November 12, 1991, to elect a mayor, councillors, and school trustees in Brantford, Ontario, Canada.

Bob Taylor, who had served on council for only one year, was elected as mayor over incumbent Karen George.

== Results ==
1991 Brantford municipal election: Mayor of Brantford
Candidate	Votes	%
Bob Taylor	13,561	56.06
(x)Karen George	6,200	25.63
Pat Luciani	3,598	14.88
William Stewart	829	3.43
Total valid votes	24,188	100

- Patrick "Pat" Luciani is a businessperson in Brantford. He was elected to Brantford city council for the city's third ward in 1972 and 1974; this followed two unsuccessful bids in 1968 and 1970. He did not seek re-election in 1976. After a nine-year break, he was returned to council in 1985, winning a seat in the city's fifth ward. Luciani first ran for mayor of Brantford in the 1988 municipal election and finished a distant second against incumbent Karen George. He described his second loss in 1991 as "disappointing," adding that the protest vote did not break as he expected. In 1996, Luciani led a group of Brantford businesspersons in proposing a private university named after Alexander Graham Bell, targeted to overseas enrollment. The project never came to fruition. He was more successful in bringing back the Italian Village to Brantford's International Villages Festival in 2008, and he also helped organize local relief efforts following the 2009 L'Aquila earthquake.

1991 Brantford municipal election: Councillor, Ward Two (two members elected)
Candidate	Votes	%
John Sless	2,709	27.98
Bob Lancaster	2,373	24.51
Vince Bucci	2,110	21.79
Chris Brown	1,468	15.16
Bob Bell	1,023	10.56
Total valid votes	9,683	100

1991 Brantford municipal election: Councillor, Ward Three (two members elected)
Candidate	Votes	%
(x)Mike Hancock	3,361	36.54
(x)Max Sherman	2,964	32.22
Lynn Stone	2,873	31.24
Total valid votes	9,198	100

1991 Brantford municipal election: Councillor, Ward Four (two members elected)
Candidate	Votes	%
(x)Andy Woodburn	2,992	41.84
(x)Rina Colaiacovo	2,492	34.85
Chuck Giles	1,667	23.31
Total valid votes	7,151	100

1991 Brantford municipal election: Brant County Board of Education, City of Brantford (eleven members)
Candidate	Votes	%
(x)Jean Anderson	7,428	7.17
(x)Kaye Davies	5,696	5.50
(x)John Castle	5,450	5.26
(x)Edward Pass	5,428	5.24
(x)Emma Eyre	5,400	5.21
(x)Lois White	5,124	4.95
(x)Mark Stenabaugh	4,810	4.64
Dorleen Allen	4,686	4.52
Jane Angus	4,678	4.52
Gord Ward	4,120	3.98
Bob Thompson	4,017	3.88
(x)Denys Jones	4,009	3.87
Mike Boughner	3,620	3.50
Margaret Carpenter	3,450	3.33
Ross Baker	3,300	3.19
Enid Green	3,300	3.19
Tom Bassett	3,177	3.07
Tom Davis	3,022	2.92
Alex Chorniak	2,935	2.83
Dan Houssar	2,704	2.61
George Bedford	2,588	2.50
Dave Mann	2,587	2.50
Ron Houston	2,259	2.18
Daphne Kirkpatrick	1,957	1.89
David Belleville	1,890	1.82
Bill St. Pierre	1,729	1.67
Gary Dumbleton	1,658	1.60
Robert Tansley	1,621	1.57
Bernard Morrissey	919	0.89
Total valid votes	103,562	100

- Enid Green ran unsuccessfully for the Brantford City Council in 1978, 1980, 1982, and 1985. She briefly served as a member of council in 1982, when she was appointed to replace deceased council member Charles Ward. She has also been an executive member of the Business and Professional Women's Club of Brant. She ran for a seat on the board of education in 1991, without success. In 2000, Green recommended that profits from the Brantford Charity Casino be directed toward subsidizing bus passes for low-income individuals.
