= Karen George =

Canadian politician

Karen George is a politician in the Canadian province of Ontario. She served as the mayor of Brantford from 1987 to 1991. She was the first, and so far only, female mayor of Brantford.

== Private career ==
During the 1970s and 1980s, George co-owned a company that operated two day care centres, originally started in 1949 by her mother Beryl Angus. She was appointed to a federal small business consultative committee in 1986. In 1992 she entered the field of Financial Planning, starting as an associate with Bright and Associates and in 1994 opening an office "George and Edmison Partners" in partnership with Ken Edmison. She obtained her Certified Financial Planning Certificate and her Level 2 insurance licence.

== Municipal politician ==
George was elected to the Brant County Board of Education in 1976 and was re-elected in 1978, 1980, and 1982. During this time she served as Board Chair for two consecutive years. She was elected to the Brantford City Council in 1985, winning the first seat in the city's third ward.

She argued in favour of restoring the death penalty at a 1986 meeting of the Association of Municipalities of Ontario.

Mayor

George was chosen as mayor of Brantford by a council vote in September 1987, after Dave Neumann resigned the office by virtue of being elected to the Legislative Assembly of Ontario. She defeated rival candidate John Starkey by a vote of six to four.

George was mayor of Brantford when Massey Combines Corp. closed down operations in the city, throwing 425 people out of work. Describing the closure as a terrible blow to the community, she worked with federal Member of Parliament Derek Blackburn to find new employment opportunities for those affected. Later in the same year, she worked to obtain a grant from the provincial government to construct an industrial park in the city.

Re-elected to a full term in 1988, George criticized the federal government's cuts to Via Rail service in late 1989. She unexpectedly lost the mayoralty by a significant margin in the 1991 municipal election.

George was instrumental in the decision by Council to construct a new Police Station and to turn a downtown department store into an award-winning library. She worked with a community committee to obtain $2.5M from the Provincial and Federal Governments to complete the restoration of the historic Capital Theater. This restoration led to the newly renamed Sanderson Centre for the Performing Arts being awarded the Prestigious "Theatre Preservation Award" presented by the League of Historic American Theatres. She was also instrumental in obtaining $7M in Federal and Provincial Funding to complete the construction of the Icomm Centre which has subsequently become the home of the Brantford Charity Casino.

In 1999, George chaired a citizen's committee that examined payment for councillors, police board members and appointees to Brantford Hydro. She supported Mike Hancock's successful bid to become mayor of Brantford in 2003 and his bid for re-election in 2006.

== Federal and provincial politics ==
George was initially a member of the New Democratic Party, but later joined the Progressive Conservatives. She opposed a suggestion, made in 1996, that her party should merge or cooperate with the Reform Party of Canada. In 1984 she contested the nomination for the Progressive Conservative Party, losing to Rick Sterne. After the Progressive Conservative Party merged with the Canadian Alliance in 2003, she joined the resultant Conservative Party of Canada. In the 2008 federal election, she was an organizer for Conservative candidate Phil McColeman.

In the 1999 provincial election, George was the campaign manager for Progressive Conservative candidate Alayne Sokoloski.
