= Max Sherman (Ontario politician) =

Canadian politician (died 2010)

Max Sherman (died February 28, 2010) was a businessperson and politician in Brantford, Ontario, Canada. He was the city's mayor for two years and served a total of thirty-one years on the Brantford City Council.

== Early life and private career ==
Max Sherman was born in Toronto, the son of Ben Sherman, who owned and operated Sherman's Hardware for many years. The younger Sherman planned to open his own hardware store in the city, but was diagnosed with tuberculosis only three days before the store's scheduled launch in 1938. As a result, he spent ten months recovering at the Brantford Sanatorium. He later recounted that his doctor told him, "You can open your business in three days and die or go to the San, get cured and have a chance at a long, healthy life." Reflecting on the situation at age eighty-nine, he said that moving to Brantford was the right choice.

He was active in Brantford's Jewish community, serving as master of ceremonies at the opening of a new synagogue building in 1948 and chairing B'nai Brith Canada's Brantford lodge (which closed in 1974). He was refused admission into the Brantford chapter of an international service organization in the 1950s because of anti-Semitism, though he chose not to publicize the matter at the time. Many years later, he said that popular opinions had changed significantly in his lifetime and described Brantford as "a good town to live in."

== Political career ==
Sherman later started a hardware store in Brantford and became involved in the city's political life. He first served on city council from 1953 to 1957, when he began a two-year term as mayor. He sought election to the Legislative Assembly of Ontario in the 1959 provincial election, but was defeated. He served further terms on city council from 1961 to 1964 and from 1976 to 1997. During his last twenty-one years on council, he represented the city's third ward.

As mayor, Sherman led council in purchasing the land on which Brantford City Hall now sits. He also helped bring about the Brantford Civic Centre (now TD Civic Centre) and oversaw the start of construction for the city's sewage treatment plant. The later measure was undertaken, in large part, to improve the environmental condition of the Grand River.

Sherman helped negotiate the 1980 Brant-Brantford Annexation Agreement, which saw the county shift a piece of its territory to the city. He later said that he regarded the agreement as a success story and criticized popular perceptions that it took place amid acrimony and threats of retribution. Sherman also chaired the Brant County social services committee in the 1980s; in 1985, he criticized county politicians for attempting to cut off most social assistance recipients.

Sherman was a respected public figure during his later years, serving on several boards including the Brantford Waste Reduction Steering Committee, the Brantford Community Services Advisory Board, and the Victorian Order of Nurses Brant-Haldimand-Norfolk Branch. Max Sherman Drive, the foyer at city hall, and the auditorium at the Brantford Seniors' Centre are all named in his honour. He supported Mike Hancock's successful mayoral campaigns in 2003 and 2006.

He died in 2010 at age ninety-five.

== Electoral record ==
Municipal (partial)

1994 Brantford municipal election: Councillor, Ward Three (two members elected)
Candidate	Votes	%
(x)Mike Hancock	4,195	39.61
(x)Max Sherman	3,133	29.58
Lynn Stone	2,688	25.38
Paul Skoczylas	574	5.42
Total valid votes	10,590	100

1991 Brantford municipal election: Councillor, Ward Three (two members elected)
Candidate	Votes	%
(x)Mike Hancock	3,361	36.54
(x)Max Sherman	2,964	32.22
Lynn Stone	2,873	31.24
Total valid votes	9,198	100

1988 Brantford municipal election: Councillor, Ward Three (two members elected)
Candidate	Votes	%
Mike Hancock	3,148	27.45
(x)Max Sherman	3,065	26.73
Chris Brown	2,982	26.01
Vince Bucci	2,272	19.81
Total valid votes	11,467	100

1985 Brantford municipal election: Councillor, Ward Three (two members elected)
Candidate	Votes	%
Karen George	2,507	37.88
(x)Max Sherman	2,144	32.39
Chris Brown	1,362	20.58
Ron Houston	606	9.16
Total valid votes	6,619	100

1982 Brantford municipal election: Councillor, Ward Three (two members elected)
Candidate	Votes	%
(x)Max Sherman	2,329	28.68
(x)Bob Mroz	2,154	26.53
Chris Brown	1,781	21.93
Tom Fogarty	790	9.73
Fred Widerick	651	8.02
Ken Freeman	415	5.11
Total valid votes	8,120	100

1980 Brantford municipal election: Councillor, Ward Three (two members elected)
Candidate	Votes	%
(x)Max Sherman	accl.	-
Bob Mroz	accl.	-

1978 Brantford municipal election: Councillor, Ward Three (two members elected)
Candidate	Votes	%
(x)Max Sherman	accl.	-
Mike Woodburn	accl.	-

1976 Brantford municipal election: Councillor, Ward Three (two members elected)
Candidate	Votes	%
(x)Mabel Cooper	2,450	27.66
Max Sherman	2,250	25.40
Michael Woodburn	2,179	24.60
Howard Minard	1,707	19.27
Raymond Lever	271	3.06
Total valid votes	8,857	100

Provincial

1959 Ontario general election: Brantford
Party	Candidate	Votes	%
Liberal	George Gordon	8,011	45.08
Progressive Conservative	Max Sherman	6,551	36.87
Co-operative Commonwealth	Clare Easto	3,208	18.05
Total valid votes		17,770	
