= 2000 Brantford municipal election =

The 2000 Brantford municipal election was held on November 13, 2000, to elect a mayor, city councillors, and school trustees in the city of Brantford, Ontario, Canada.

== Results ==
2000 Brantford municipal election: Mayor of Brantford
Candidate	Votes	%
(x)Chris Friel	13,251	45.60
John Starkey	9,586	32.99
Dave Neumann	4,015	13.82
Kevin Raymond	1,777	6.12
Winston C. Ferguson	245	0.84
Joseph Robert Gallant	185	0.64
Total valid votes	29,059	100

- Kevin Raymond was born in Sudbury, lived in Hamilton during his youth, and later moved to Toronto. He is a member of the Liberal Party and was an assistant for Member of Parliament (MP) Jane Stewart and Member of Provincial Parliament (MPP) Dave Levac before running for office himself. He has also been a youth councillor and corporate recruiter and has done fundraising work for Habitat for Humanity. After the 2000 election, he was a citizen appointee to Brantford's Waste Reduction Steering Committee.
- Joseph Robert Gallant is a former Roman Catholic priest from North Bay who later worked as an interior designer. He took part in a protest against Archbishop Aloysius Ambrozic in 1994, after Ambrozic spoke against provincial legislation to expand the rights of same-sex couples. He ran for mayor of Brantford in 1997 and 2000. Fifty-five years old on the latter occasion, he described himself as a "controversial candidate" and as someone who had never been a politician. He called for a renewal of Brantford's downtown in both elections, supported a charity casino in 1997, and decried the links between politicians and developers in 2000.

2000 Brantford municipal election: Councillor, Ward One (two members elected)
Candidate	Votes	%
(x)Paul Urbanowicz	2,908	31.47
Larry Kings	2,398	25.95
Mike Quattrociocchi	1,450	15.69
Judy Friel	1,367	14.79
Mike Tutt	878	9.50
Richard Pikulski	240	2.60
Total valid votes	9,241	100

- Judy Friel began her career in early child care work in 1968. She has owned and operated several child care centres in Brantford and has received a Prime Minister's Award for Excellence in Early Childhood Education. Friel is the mother of Chris Friel, who served as mayor of Brantford from 1994 to 2003 and was elected to the same office again in 2010. Her late husband, James Friel, also sought election to public office in Brantford in 1976. She decided to run for council after her son said he that would not seek re-election as mayor. He later reconsidered and was elected to another term; local reports suggest that his decision prevented his mother from running a credible independent campaign. She was fifty-seven years old in 2000 and said that her primary concerns were the environment, completion of the Brantford Southern Access Route, and an expansion of youth facilities.

2000 Brantford municipal election: Councillor, Ward Two (two members elected)
Candidate	Votes	%
(x)Vince Bucci	4,498	40.97
(x)John Sless	4,437	40.41
Chuck Giles	2,044	18.62
Total valid votes	10,979	100

- Chuck Giles, who was fifty-five years old in 2000, was a teacher, childcare worker, and residential counsellor prior to his retirement. He has been a director with the Ontario Housing Corporation and a member of the Brantford General Hospital Board. He ran for mayor of Brantford in 1994 and for city council in 1991 and 2000, losing each time. He acknowledged that he had no change of winning in 2000 and said that he only ran to prevent John Sless and Vince Bucci from winning without opposition. Giles later became involved in campaigns against elder abuse and co-founded Brantford's Seniors Resource Centre.

2000 Brantford municipal election: Councillor, Ward Three (two members elected)
Candidate	Votes	%
(x)Mike Hancock	4,793	40.46
Greg Martin	3,593	30.33
(x)Bob Taylor	3,459	29.20
Total valid votes	11,845	100

2000 Brantford municipal election: Councillor, Ward Four (two members elected)
Candidate	Votes	%
(x)Richard Carpenter	4,008	38.22
Dave Wrobel	2,130	20.31
Andy Woodburn	1,864	17.77
(x)Pat Franklin	1,757	16.75
Mark Johnson	729	6.95
Total valid votes	10,488	100

2000 Brantford municipal election: Councillor, Ward Five (two members elected)
Candidate	Votes	%
(x)Marguerite Ceschi-Smith	2,792	36.25
(x)Wally Lucente	2,395	31.10
Tim Philp	1,816	23.58
Shawn MacKeigan	699	9.08
Total valid votes	7,702	100

- Shawn MacKeigan was a first-time political candidate, aged twenty-two. He was a graduate of Pauline Johnson Collegiate and worked for a Kitchener-based company in 2000. He called for downtown renewal and the expansion of Laurier Brantford, and said he would like to see Brantford's downtown become a university community. He later became chairman of the Canadian Union of Public Employees, Local 181, representing Ontario Works Brant, and helped build a coalition of local labour groups ahead of collective bargaining.

Source: Ross Marowits, "Friel rides happiness," Brantford Expositor, 14 November 2000, A3.
