= 2003 Brantford municipal election =

The 2003 Brantford municipal election was held on November 10, 2003, to elect a mayor, city councillors, and school trustees in the city of Brantford, Ontario.

Mike Hancock narrowly defeated incumbent Chris Friel in the mayoral contest, winning by only fifteen votes. Despite the close margin, Friel decided not to seek a recount.

== Results ==
2003 Brantford municipal election: Mayor of Brantford
Candidate	Votes	%
(x)Mike Hancock	11,668	48.53
Chris Friel	11,653	48.47
Randy Tooke	721	3.00
Total valid votes	24,042	100

- Randy Tooke was thirty-one years old during the election and owned a café in Brantford. He focused his campaign around a call for downtown revitalization to benefit small-business owners.

2003 Brantford municipal election: Councillor, Ward One (two members elected)
Candidate	Votes	%
Mike Quattrociocchi	2,149	26.28
(x)Larry Kings	1,848	22.60
(x)Paul Urbanowicz	1,731	21.17
Jeremy Atkins	1,026	12.55
Jack Krantz	877	10.73
Rod Smith	336	4.11
Richard Pikulski	209	2.56
Total valid votes	8,176	100

2003 Brantford municipal election: Councillor, Ward Two (two members elected)
Candidate	Votes	%
Stephen Lancaster	3,276	33.00
(x)John Sless	2,819	28.39
(x)Vince Bucci	2,309	23.26
David Sharpe	1,524	15.35
Total valid votes	9,928	100

2003 Brantford municipal election: Councillor, Ward Three (two members elected)
Candidate	Votes	%
(x)Greg Martin	3,511	34.67
Dan McCreary	3,002	29.64
Andy Woodburn	1,554	15.35
Murray Angus	1,304	12.88
Paul Myers	617	6.09
Peter Sheere	139	1.37
Total valid votes	10,127	100

2003 Brantford municipal election: Councillor, Ward Four (two members elected)
Candidate	Votes	%
(x)Richard Carpenter	3,554	44.38
(x)Dave Wrobel	2,712	33.86
James Calnan	1,743	21.76
Total valid votes	8,009	100

2003 Brantford municipal election: Councillor, Ward Five (two members elected)
Candidate	Votes	%
(x)Marguerite Ceschi-Smith	2,753	40.98
John Starkey	1,321	19.66
(x)Wally Lucente	1,135	16.89
Dwight A. Ayerhart	868	12.92
Skip Pennell	345	5.14
Mike Clancy	245	3.65
Russell Skelton	51	0.76
Total valid votes	6,718	100

- Wally Lucente was born and raised in Brantford. He first ran for the Brantford City Council in 1985 with support from the Brantford and District Labour Council; he was thirty years old at the time and worked for the provincial labour ministry. Defeated on that occasion, he was elected in 1988, 1991, 1994, 1997, and 2000. During his time on council, he chaired Brantford's police services board; waterfront advisory committee; Mohawk Lake committee; and engineering, public works and community services committee. In 2001, he raised the option of a combined municipal police force for Brantford and neighbouring Brant County. While he often had poor relations with his fellow ward councillor Marguerite Ceschi-Smith, he nonetheless supported her downtown brownfield rehabilitation program in 2002. When Lucente ran for re-election in 2003, he said that he wanted to see the Brantford Southern Access Road through to completion. During the 2003 election, local journalist Tim Philp described him as a "good councillor" who "carries out his duties but contributes little useful to council discussions." After his defeat, he continued working for the provincial labour ministry and chaired the Brant County Police Services Board as a citizen member.
- Charles "Skip" Pennell is best known as a tourism supporter in Brantford. He was active with the Pine Tree Native Centre in the 1990s and early 2000s and was the project coordinator for Kanata, a replica seventeenth-century Iroquois village that opened in 2000. The village won an award for Best New Tourism Attraction in Ontario and was runner-up for Best New Attraction of Canada. Pennell has also chaired Brantford's tourism advisory board. He was fifty-one years old when he ran for council; he said that he respected incumbent councillors Marguerite Ceschi-Smith and Wally Lucente and was running to offer another voice.

Source: Vincent Ball, "Council table shake up: Four new faces elected by Brantford voters wanting change," Brantford Expositor, 11 November 2003, A3.
