= 1994 Brantford municipal election =

The 1994 Brantford municipal election was held on November 14, 1994, to elect a mayor, councillors, and school trustees in the city of Brantford, Ontario.

In the mayoral contest, Chris Friel defeated one-term incumbent Bob Taylor.

== Results ==
1994 Brantford municipal election: Mayor of Brantford
Candidate	Votes	%
Chris Friel	10,695	41.97
(x)Bob Taylor	7,631	29.95
Bob Lancaster	3,981	15.62
John Starkey	1,754	6.88
Dan McCreary	1,094	4.29
Chuck Giles	325	1.28
Total valid votes	25,480	100

- Bob Lancaster was raised in the small community of Little Lake, Ontario. He was first elected to the Brantford City Council in 1978, winning a seat in the city's second ward. He was re-elected without opposition in 1980 and was returned again in 1982. After standing down in 1985, he returned to council in 1991 and served another term. Lancaster was fifty-four years old in 1994, worked as a realtor, and was seen as a pro-business candidate. After the 1994 election, he complained to the Ontario Press Council about election coverage in the Brantford Expositor. The case was dismissed. He later chaired both the Brantford police services board and the Brant and Brantford Housing Authority as a citizen appointee. His nephew Stephen Lancaster has also been a councillor.

1994 Brantford municipal election: Councillor, Ward Two (two members elected)
Candidate	Votes	%
(x)John Sless	3,591	36.68
Vince Bucci	3,184	32.52
Ray McAllister	1,975	20.17
Don Francis	1,040	10.62
Total valid votes	9,790	100

1994 Brantford municipal election: Councillor, Ward Three (two members elected)
Candidate	Votes	%
(x)Mike Hancock	4,195	39.61
(x)Max Sherman	3,133	29.58
Lynn Stone	2,688	25.38
Paul Skoczylas	574	5.42
Total valid votes	10,590	100

1994 Brantford municipal election: Councillor, Ward Four (two members elected)
Candidate	Votes	%
Richard Carpenter	2,874	35.21
(x)Andy Woodburn	1,974	24.19
Chris Stanek	1,701	20.84
Chuck McPhail	931	11.41
John Bragg	682	8.36
Total valid votes	8,162	100

1994 Brantford municipal election: Councillor, Ward Five (two members elected)
Candidate	Votes	%
(x)Wally Lucente	2,527	36.14
Marguerite Ceschi-Smith	2,096	29.97
(x)Robert E. Smith	2,006	28.69
Russell Skelton	364	5.21
Total valid votes	6,993	100

- Robert E. Smith (died November 15, 2009) was a veterinarian. He graduated from the Ontario Veterinary College (later a part of the University of Guelph) in 1956 and operated a hospital practice in Indianapolis, Indiana, until 1975. He later moved to Brantford and opened a new practice in 1978. He became a founding member of the Society of Ontario Veterinarians and retired in 2002. Smith served one year on the Brantford city council after defeating incumbent councillor Charles Bowen for the second position in the city's fifth ward in 1991. He was narrowly defeated by Marguerite Ceschi-Smith in 1994. A decade later, he wrote public letters calling for increased protection for the elderly, for the dismissal of Brantford's highest-paid municipal staff, and against granting legal status for religious arbitration in Ontario. He died in 2009, at age seventy-seven, after a farming accident.

Source: Brantford Expositor, 15 November 1994, p. 7.
