= Chris Friel (politician) =

Canadian politician (born 1967)

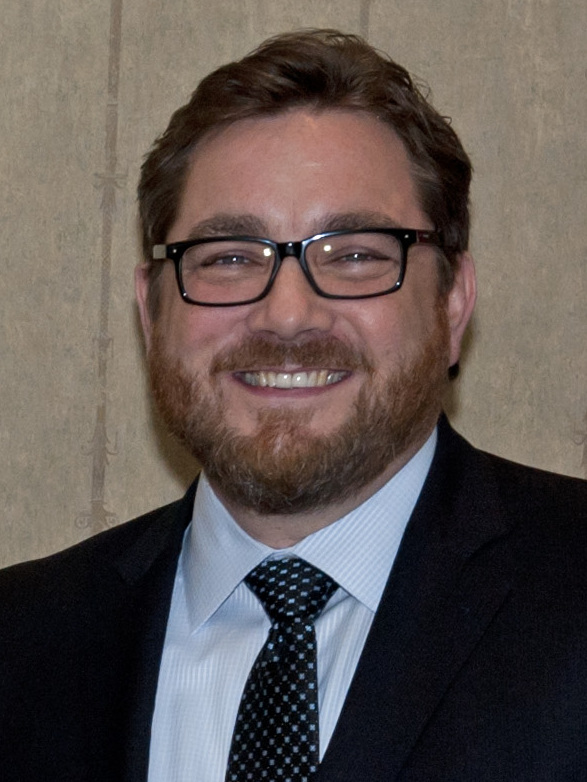

49th and 51st Mayor of Brantford
- In office December 1, 2010 – December 2018
- Preceded by: Mike Hancock
- Succeeded by: Kevin Davis
- In office 1994–2003
- Preceded by: Bob Taylor
- Succeeded by: Mike Hancock

Personal details
- Born: February 26, 1967 (age 59) Brantford, Ontario

Chris Friel (born February 26, 1967) is a politician in the Canadian province of Ontario. He was the mayor of Brantford from 1994 to 2003 and was re-elected to the same position in the 2010 municipal election. He was defeated in the 2018 municipal election by Kevin Davis.

== Early life and private career ==
Friel was born and raised in Brantford. He has an Honours Bachelor of Arts degree in political science from the University of Waterloo (1989). Before running for office, he was the executive director of a non-profit government agency.

Both of his parents were active in politics. His father, James Friel, was involved in the labour movement and ran for a trustee position on the Brant County Board of Education in 1976. His mother, Judy Friel, ran for a seat on the Brantford City Council in 2000.

After his loss in 2003, he worked in business and economic development with the Ontario Native Affairs Secretariat.

== Mayor of Brantford ==
Friel was first elected as mayor of Brantford in the 1994 municipal election, defeating one-term incumbent Bob Taylor. He was only twenty-seven years old at the time. He was re-elected in 1997, defeating right-wing candidate Andy Woodburn by a significant margin. He initially planned to stand down in 2000, but later changed his mind and was re-elected for a third term.

Friel became mayor during a period of economic difficulties for Brantford; shortly after his election, he described the city as having the worst downtown in Canada. He later presided over a period of economic growth for the city.

Friel initially opposed the Brantford Charity Casino, describing it as a "scam" designed to shift money from the city to the province. He was quoted as saying, "What bothers me is that the government used to do these capital projects to build a country. . . . Now the government is doing work that is building gaming. It's like they've given up, there's no creativity." He later accepted the casino's presence and tried to ensure it would provide some benefits to his community, though he still described it as an economic mistake.

He helped establish Laurier Brantford, a local division of Wilfrid Laurier University. He was also mayor when the Brantford Eaton's closed and took part in overseeing the site's transformation into a call centre. During his second term, he spoke in favour of keeping the Brantford Hydro-Electric Commission as a public utility.

Friel encouraged merger discussions between Brantford and neighbouring Brant County in 2000. At one stage, he said that he would ask the province to impose a decision on restructuring if the county declined talks. Brant County Mayor Ron Eddy strongly opposed this position, and Friel later acknowledged that producing a local agreement would be impossible. During the same period, Friel argued that the Six Nations people have a legitimate claim to the land surrounding the Grand River, six miles in each direction. Generally, Friel was known for having good relations with local indigenous groups.

Friel strongly supported Brantford's anti-smoking by-law, citing his own father's death from lung cancer at a relatively young age. He himself took a three-month leave of absence in 2002 due to serious health issues.

Friel was defeated in the 2003 mayoral election, losing to Mike Hancock by only fifteen votes. He chose not to seek a recount. He challenged Hancock again in the 2006 election and lost by 165 votes. When Hancock did not seek re-election in 2010, Friel ran for mayor again and won by a significant margin.

A newspaper article from 2000 described his political style as "flamboyant, sometimes truculent." When running for re-election in 2003, he acknowledged that he had been an unorthodox mayor.

== Federal and provincial politics ==
Friel was a political ally of Brant Member of Parliament (MP) Jane Stewart, who served as a cabinet minister in Jean Chrétien's government. He strongly criticized provincial premier Mike Harris at a 2001 Labour Day rally, although he was more complimentary toward Chris Hodgson, Harris's municipal affairs minister.

Friel sought the Liberal Party nomination for Brant in the buildup to the 2004 federal election, but lost to Lloyd St. Amand.

== Electoral record ==
2010 Brantford municipal election: Mayor of Brantford
Candidate	Votes	%
(x)Chris Friel	11,334	41.80
John Sless	5,466	20.16
Mark Littell	3,417	12.60
Dianne M. Austin	3,267	12.05
Mike Quattrociocchi	1,875	6.92
James Calnan	1,068	3.94
Richard E. Casey	495	1.83
Winston C. Ferguson	131	0.48
John Turmel	61	0.22
Total valid votes	27,114	100

- See the 2010 Brantford election page for information on defeated candidates other than Turmel.

2006 Brantford municipal election: Mayor of Brantford
Candidate	Votes	%
(x)Mike Hancock	13,212	49.22
Chris Friel	13,047	48.60
Winston C. Ferguson	360	1.34
John Turmel	226	0.84
Total valid votes	26,845	100

2003 Brantford municipal election: Mayor of Brantford
Candidate	Votes	%
(x)Mike Hancock	11,668	48.53
Chris Friel	11,653	48.47
Randy Tooke	721	3.00
Total valid votes	24,042	100

- See the 2003 Brantford election page for information on Tooke.

2000 Brantford municipal election: Mayor of Brantford
Candidate	Votes	%
(x)Chris Friel	13,251	45.60
John Starkey	9,586	32.99
Dave Neumann	4,015	13.82
Kevin Raymond	1,777	6.12
Winston C. Ferguson	245	0.84
Joseph Robert Gallant	185	0.64
Total valid votes	29,059	100

- See the 2000 Brantford election page for information on Raymond and Gallant.

1997 Brantford municipal election: Mayor of Brantford
Candidate	Votes	%
(x)Chris Friel	18,442	67.83
Andy Woodburn	5,521	20.31
Wayne Barlett	1,600	5.89
Joseph Robert Gallant	1,174	4.32
Patrick Clement	450	1.66
Total valid votes	27,187	100

- See the 1997 Brantford election page for information on Barlett and Clement.

1994 Brantford municipal election: Mayor of Brantford
Candidate	Votes	%
Chris Friel	10,695	41.97
(x)Bob Taylor	7,631	29.95
Bob Lancaster	3,981	15.62
John Starkey	1,754	6.88
Dan McCreary	1,094	4.29
Chuck Giles	325	1.28
Total valid votes	25,480	100

- See the 1994 Brantford election page for information on Lancaster.
