= 1985 Brantford municipal election =

The 1985 Brantford municipal election was held on November 12, 1985, to elect a mayor, city councillors, and school trustees in Brantford, Ontario, Canada. The rural and small-town communities surrounding Brantford also held elections on the same day.

== Results ==
1985 Brantford municipal election: Mayor of Brantford
Candidate	Votes	%
(x)Dave Neumann	14,285	83.77
William Stewart	1,589	9.32
Andy Woolley	1,178	6.91
Total valid votes	17,052	100

- Andy Woolley was a perennial candidate who ran for mayor of Brantford in 1978, 1980, 1982 and 1985. He was described as a school caretaker in 1980.

1985 Brantford municipal election: Councillor, Ward One (two members elected)
Candidate	Votes	%
(x)John Starkey	1,804	27.33
(x)Jo Brennan	1,634	24.75
Don Francis	1,155	17.50
Clive Wellington	714	10.82
Fred Kelley	532	8.06
Paul Urbanowicz	468	7.09
Michael Miles	294	4.45
Total valid votes	6,601	100

1985 Brantford municipal election: Councillor, Ward Two (two members elected)
Candidate	Votes	%
Kevin Davis	2,483	32.28
Brad Ward	1,906	24.78
Vince Bucci	1,292	16.80
Tom Potter	974	12.66
Enid Green	648	8.43
Paul Mellor	388	5.04
Total valid votes	7,691	100

- Tom Potter used the slogan, "Active Representative, Accessible Alderman" in the 1985 campaign. Three years later, he wrote a letter to The Globe and Mail criticizing a requirement that all members of the Legislative Assembly of Ontario and their families be required to declare their assets. Potter described as an invasion of privacy.
- Paul Mellor appears to have been a first-time candidate for public office. He is not the same person as a Paul Mellor from Niagara Falls who was accused of murder in 2009.

1985 Brantford municipal election: Councillor, Ward Three (two members elected)
Candidate	Votes	%
Karen George	2,507	37.88
(x)Max Sherman	2,144	32.39
Chris Brown	1,362	20.58
Ron Houston	606	9.16
Total valid votes	6,619	100

1985 Brantford municipal election: Councillor, Ward Four (two members elected)
Candidate	Votes	%
(x)Andy Woodburn	1,756	36.51
Steve Bosanac	1,171	24.35
Bob Bell	673	13.99
Dan Houssar	618	12.85
Ivan Vander Deen	591	12.29
Total valid votes	4,809	100

1985 Brantford municipal election: Councillor, Ward Five (two members elected)
Candidate	Votes	%
Pat Luciani	1,608	29.41
Raymond Simpson	1,435	26.25
Wally Lucente	914	16.72
Tom Oldham	788	14.41
Lillian Currell	368	6.73
Yvonne McMahon	354	6.48
Total valid votes	5,467	100

- Yvonne McMahon ran for Brantford's fifth ward in 1976 and 1985, losing both times. She also ran a protest campaign for mayor of Brantford in 1982, finishing a distant second against incumbent Dave Neumann.
