= 2006 Brantford municipal election =

The 2006 Brantford municipal election was held on November 13, 2006, to elect a mayor, councillors, and school trustees in the city of Brantford, Ontario.

== Results (partial) ==
2006 Brantford municipal election: Mayor of Brantford
Candidate	Votes	%
(x)Mike Hancock	13,212	49.22
Chris Friel	13,047	48.60
Winston C. Ferguson	360	1.34
John Turmel	226	0.84
Total valid votes	26,845	100

2006 Brantford municipal election: Councillor, Ward One (two members elected)
Candidate	Votes	%
Mark Littell	2,278	22.66
Jennifer Kinneman	2,274	22.62
(x)Larry Kings	2,216	22.04
(x)Mike Quattrociocchi	1,275	12.68
June A. Grieve	1,205	11.98
Brian Beattie	704	7.00
Philip Romanenko	103	1.02
Total valid votes	10,055	100

2006 Brantford municipal election: Councillor, Ward Two (two members elected)
Candidate	Votes	%
(x)John Sless	3,506	31.96
Vince Bucci	2,489	22.69
Fred Minna	2,164	19.72
(x)Stephen Lancaster	1,315	11.99
Richard Wright	1,018	9.28
Jack Krantz	479	4.37
Total valid votes	10,971	100

- Fred Minna supported the Progressive Conservative Party of Ontario and the Progressive Conservative Party of Canada in the late 1990s and early 2000s. He wrote a letter endorsing the provincial government of Mike Harris in the 1999 provincial election and was the vote organizer for Brant in the 2003 Progressive Conservative Party of Canada leadership convention. He sought election to the Brantford city council in 1997 and 2006, finishing third both times.

2006 Brantford municipal election: Councillor, Ward Three (two members elected)
Candidate	Votes	%
(x)Dan McCreary	3,151	29.64
(x)Greg Martin	3,123	29.37
Sue Ferras	2,707	25.46
Paul Myers	957	9.00
Tracey Bucci	694	6.53
Total valid votes	10,632	100

2006 Brantford municipal election: Councillor, Ward Four (two members elected)
Candidate	Votes	%
(x)Richard Carpenter	3,505	46.36
(x)James Calnan	1,741	23.03
Martin Sarkissian	1,362	18.02
Dan Houssar	952	12.59
Total valid votes	7,560	100

2006 Brantford municipal election: Councillor, Ward Five (two members elected)
Candidate	Votes	%
(x)Marguerite Ceschi-Smith	3,317	40.80
John K. Bradford	2,148	26.42
Dwight A. Ayerhart	1,602	19.71
Adam King	774	9.52
Russell H. Skelton	159	1.96
Duane Leeallen	129	1.59
Total valid votes	8,129	100

- Russell H. Skelton ran unsuccessfully for Brantford City Council in 1994, 2003, and 2006. Thirty-eight years old during the 2003 election, he ran on a platform of greater consultation with the electorate and increased road safety.
- Duane LeeAllen has been active with Brant Artscapes. He was thirty-four years old during the 2006 election. LeeAllen ran in opposition to the city's proposed culture plan, arguing that it inappropriately privileged the non-profit sector to the detriment of private businesses. He also pledged to make culture events more affordable for low-income residents.

2006 Brantford municipal election: Trustees, Grand Erie District School Board (four members elected)
Candidate	Votes	%
Jane Angus	10,567	19.09
Carol Ann Sloat	7,271	13.14
Michael Hurley	7,026	12.70
Chris Lefebvre	6,384	11.54
Sandra Biggar	5,699	10.30
Wenda Allicock	5,561	10.05
Andy Molenaar	5,347	9.66
Dennis Finucan	4,816	8.70
Dale Renout	2,671	4.83
Total valid votes	55,342	100

- Dale Renout is a Baptist clergyman. He has a bachelor's degree in religious education and described himself as working toward a Master of Divinity in 2006. He has served on the Grand Erie board's special education committee. Renout has run for public office on four occasions. He ran for the Brant County Public School Board and its successor Grand Erie District School Board in 1994, 2000, and 2006, and also for the Brantford city council's fifth ward in 1997. Renout wrote an equivocal public letter on the invasion of Iraq in 2003, saying that he was "not a proponent of war" but adding that, in his view, some justice was needed for the victims of Iraq's regime. Although Renout was personally opposed to same-sex marriage, he described some same-sex marriage opposition in Canada as "hate mongering" and called for churches to focus on humanitarian issues. In 2006, he wrote in favour of continuing Canada's military mission in Afghanistan. He has been critical of both the federal Conservative Party and the federal Liberal Party for their records in office.

Source: Official results: City of Brantford.
