= Max Sherman =

Max Sherman may refer to:

- Max Sherman (Texas politician) (born 1935), Texas politician and educational administrator
- Max Sherman (Ontario politician) (died 2010), Ontario businessperson and politician
