= 1994 Ontario municipal elections =

- November 14, 1994
- Turnout: 44.8%

The 1994 Ontario municipal elections were held on November 14, 1994, to elect mayors, reeves, councillors, and school trustees in all municipalities across Ontario. Some communities also held referendum questions.

The most closely watched contest was in Toronto, where Barbara Hall defeated one-term incumbent June Rowlands for the mayoralty.

== Elected mayors ==
- Ajax: James Whitty
- Barrie: Janice Laking
- Brampton: Peter Robertson
- Brantford: Chris Friel (details)
- Burlington: Walker Mulkewich
- Cambridge: Jane Brewer
- Clarington: Diane Hamre
- East York: Michael Prue
- Etobicoke: Doug Holyday
- Gloucester: Claudette Cain (details)
- Guelph: Joe Young (details)
- Hamilton: Bob Morrow (details)
- Kingston: Gary Bennett
- Kitchener: Richard Christie
- London: Dianne Haskett
- Markham: Don Cousens
- Mississauga: Hazel McCallion
- Nepean: Ben Franklin (details)
- Niagara Falls: Wayne Thomson
- North Bay: Jack Burrows
- North York: Mel Lastman
- Oakville: Ann Mulvale
- Oshawa: Nancy Diamond
- Ottawa: Jacquelin Holzman (details)
- Peterborough: Jack Doris
- Pickering: Wayne Arthurs
- Richmond Hill: Bill Bell
- Sarnia: Mike Bradley
- Sault Ste. Marie: Joe Fratesi
- Scarborough: Frank Faubert
- St. Catharines: Al Unwin
- Sudbury: Jim Gordon
- Thunder Bay: David Hamilton
- Timmins: Vic Power
- Toronto: Barbara Hall (details)
- Vaughan: Lorna Jackson
- Waterloo: Brian Turnbull
- Whitby: Tom Edwards
- Windsor: Mike Hurst
- York: Frances Nunziata

== Toronto ==
1994 Toronto municipal election: Mayor of Toronto
| Candidate | Votes | % |
|---|---|---|
| Barbara Hall | 70,248 | 43.05 |
| (x) June Rowlands | 58,952 | 36.13 |
| Gerry Meinzer | 20,868 | 12.79 |
| Jenny Friedland | 2,858 | 1.75 |
| Don Andrews | 2,839 | 1.74 |
| Ben Kerr | 1,634 | 1.00 |
| Lili Weemen | 1,296 | 0.79 |
| Lorna Houston | 1,214 | 0.74 |
| John Steele | 1,200 | 0.74 |
| Sam Bornstein | 1,193 | 0.73 |
| Bob Hyman | 857 | 0.53 |
| Total valid votes | 163,159 | 100.00 |

Source: Toronto Elections, City of Toronto.
