= Ian MacNeil =

Ian MacNeil may refer to:

- Ian MacNeil (politician), Conservative Party candidate in the 2004 Canadian federal election
- Ian MacNeil (scenic designer) (born 1960), stage set designer
- Ian MacNeil (ice hockey) (born 1977), Canadian ice hockey player
- Ian Roderick Macneil (1929–2010), American legal scholar
- Ian McNeill (1932–2017), Scottish footballer
