= 1982 Brantford municipal election =

The 1982 Brantford municipal election was held on November 8, 1982, to elect a mayor, councillors, and school trustees in Brantford, Ontario, Canada. The surrounding rural and small-town municipalities also held elections on the same day.

== Results ==
1982 Brantford municipal election: Mayor of Brantford
Candidate	Votes	%
(x)Dave Neumann	16,267	75.68
Yvonne McMahon	1,638	7.62
William Stewart	1,136	5.28
Robert MacKeigan	1,014	4.72
Andy Woolley	954	4.44
Lenny Kerr	486	2.27
Total valid votes	21,495	100

- Robert MacKeigan said that unemployment was the key issue in the election. He called for Brantford to generate more high-tech jobs.
- Lenny Kerr was a baker at the time of the election. He called for Brantford to seek loans from the government of Canada and the government of Ontario to target its high unemployment.

1982 Brantford municipal election: Councillor, Ward One (two members elected)
Candidate	Votes	%
(x)John Starkey	2,749	37.00
(x)Jo Brennan	2,216	29.83
Don Francis	1,978	26.63
Claire Jesney	486	6.54
Total valid votes	7,429	100

1982 Brantford municipal election: Councillor, Ward Two (two members elected)
Candidate	Votes	%
(x)Bob Lancaster	3,163	36.60
(x)Peter Hexamer	2,668	30.88
Brad Ward	1,238	14.33
Dan O'Regan	1,195	13.83
Andrew Sywyk	377	4.36
Total valid votes	8,641	100

- Daniel O'Regan (died May 20, 2010) moved to Brantford from England in 1971. He served on the executive of Brantford's United Auto Workers local and was president of the Brantford and District Labour Council. He sought election to the Brant County Board of Education in 1980 without success. In 1982, he ran for council with support from the New Democratic Party and the labour council. O'Regan was also active with the Brantford Minor Sports Association. He died in 2010 at age sixty-six, after suffering a heart attack.
- Andrew Sywyk worked with an insulation company in 1982. He campaigned against expensive municipal projects.

1982 Brantford municipal election: Councillor, Ward Three (two members elected)
Candidate	Votes	%
(x)Max Sherman	2,329	28.68
(x)Bob Mroz	2,154	26.53
Chris Brown	1,781	21.93
Tom Fogarty	790	9.73
Fred Widerick	651	8.02
Ken Freeman	415	5.11
Total valid votes	8,120	100

1982 Brantford municipal election: Councillor, Ward Four (two members elected)
Candidate	Votes	%
Andy Woodburn	1,918	30.10
Mac Makarchuk	1,401	21.98
Bruce Farley	1,241	19.47
(x)Larry Kings	903	14.17
(x)Enid Green	573	8.99
John Cartwright	199	3.12
Eileen Nutford	138	2.17
Total valid votes	6,373	100

1982 Brantford municipal election: Councillor, Ward Five (two members elected)
Candidate	Votes	%
(x)Mary Welsh	2,879	39.89
(x)Charles McPhail	2,194	30.40
Russell Wilson	1,189	16.47
Tom Oldham	956	13.24
Total valid votes	7,218	100

- Mary E. Welsh is a businesswoman, farmer, and prominent volunteer in Brantford. Raised in the city, she attended Queen's University in Kingston in the 1950s. She was elected to the Brant County Board of Education in 1970 and served for six years, finishing at the top of the City of Brantford poll in 1972 and 1974. Welsh was elected to the Brantford City Council for the city's fifth ward in 1980 and was re-elected in 1982; she did not seek re-election in 1985. She made national headlines in 1987, when a cylinder from a U.S.S.R. rocket landed in her backyard. Welsh is a founding director of the Brant Waterways Foundation and promoted completion of the Trans-Canada Trail track in Brantford. She also recommended completion of a YM/YWCA condominium-hotel to promote downtown renewal in 1999, and she led a movement to rebuild the historical Brantford Collegiate Institute in the 2000s. Welsh received the 2006 Outstanding Achievement Award for Voluntarism in Ontario, and she was appointed to the Order of Canada in 2009.
