= Dave Neumann =

Canadian politician (born 1941)

Member of the Ontario Provincial Parliament for Brantford
- In office September 10, 1987 – September 6, 1990
- Preceded by: Phil Gillies
- Succeeded by: Brad Ward

46th Mayor of Brantford
- In office 1980–1987
- Preceded by: Charles Bowen
- Succeeded by: Karen George

Brantford City Councillor for Ward Five
- In office December 1, 2010 – December 1, 2018; Serving with Marguerite Ceschi-Smith
- Preceded by: John K. Bradford
- Succeeded by: Brian Van Tilborg and Joshua Wall
- In office 1976–1980; Serving with Doug Reeves
- Preceded by: Wynn Harding and Bev Lavelle
- Succeeded by: Mary Welsh and Charles McPhail

Personal details
- Born: October 5, 1941 (age 85) Montreal, Quebec, Canada
- Party: Liberal
- Occupation: High school teacher

David Emil Neumann (born October 5, 1941) is a politician in the Canadian province of Ontario. He was the mayor of Brantford from 1980 to 1987 and served in the Legislative Assembly of Ontario as a Liberal from 1987 to 1990. After several years out of politics, he was elected as a city councillor for Brantford's fifth ward in the 2010 municipal election. He retired from the Brantford City Council in 2018.

== Early life and career ==
Neumann was born in Montreal, Quebec, and moved with his family to a dairy farm near Waterford, Ontario, as a child. He earned a degree from McMaster University in Hamilton and worked as a secondary school teacher at Pauline Johnson Collegiate. He later coordinated adult education for his school board and was president of the Brant Ontario Secondary School Teachers Federation (OSSTF).

Neumann supported The Waffle and was part of a group of Brantford-area New Democrats who favoured running party candidates at the municipal level. He ran for Brantford's fourth council ward in 1972 and nearly defeated veteran councillor Charles Ward for the second position.

== Municipal politician ==
Neumann was elected as an alderman for Brantford's fifth ward in 1976 and was re-elected without opposition in 1978. He became the city's mayor in 1980, defeating right-wing candidate Andy Woodburn and incumbent Charles Bowen, and was re-elected without serious opposition in 1982 and 1985. As mayor, Neumann helped expand Mohawk College, negotiated an agreement with Brant County that allowed Brantford to annex five thousands acres of land, concluded an agreement with the Six Nations to construct the Brantford Southern Access Road, and lobbied for the construction of Highway 403 to Ancaster.

Neumann was also in office when the city's Market Street was shut down and the unsuccessful Market Square Mall was constructed. He has rejected that suggestion that he was to blame for these developments, noting that he voted against Market Street's closure while on council, that the mall was approved by council as a whole, and that no-one could have predicted the mall's giant Eaton's store would close.

As mayor, Neumann served on the board of the Association of Municipalities of Ontario. He joined the Liberals in early 1987.

== Provincial politician ==
He ran for the Ontario legislature in the 1971 provincial election as a New Democrat, finishing third against Liberal Party leader Robert Nixon in Brant.

Neumann was elected to the Ontario legislature for Brantford in the 1987 provincial election, defeating New Democrat Jack Tubman and Progressive Conservative incumbent Phil Gillies. The Liberals won a landslide majority government in this election under David Peterson's leadership, and Neumann entered the legislature as a government backbencher. He was parliamentary assistant to the Minister of Municipal Affairs from 1987 to 1988 and chaired the standing committee on social development from 1988 to 1990.

In a 1989 interview, he cited a new telecommunications discovery centre, an industrial park, and the completion of Highway 403 as the Peterson government's main achievements for his area. Neumann also lobbied for increased Via Rail service; in August 1990, he announced that a previously cancelled commuter rail service to Brantford would reopen.

The Liberals were defeated in the 1990 provincial election, and Neumann lost his seat to New Democrat Brad Ward. He ran again in the 1995 provincial election but lost to Progressive Conservative candidate Ron Johnson.

== Since 1990 ==
Neumann resumed his teaching career after leaving political life, retiring from the Brant County Board of Education in 1997. He ran for mayor of Brantford in 2000, but, despite an endorsement from the Brantford Expositor, he finished an unexpectedly poor third against incumbent Chris Friel.

From 1998 to 2005, Neumann worked as executive director of the Ontario Association of Adult and Continuing Education School Board Administrators (CESBA), based in Brantford. He welcomed a $78,000 federal grant for literacy training in 2004. He was also president of the local Kiwanis society in 2002–03.

Neumann returned to elected office in the 2010 municipal election, winning the second seat in Brantford's fifth ward. He serves on the brownfields community advisory committee, the social services committee, and the Brantford Heritage Committee.

== Federal politics ==
Neumann supported Jean Chrétien's bid to lead the Liberal Party of Canada in 1993 and continued to support Chrétien's leadership in the years that followed.

He supported Marguerite Ceschi-Smith's bid for the Liberal nomination in Brant in the buildup to the 2004 federal election. Ceschi-Smith lost to Lloyd St. Amand.

== Electoral record ==
Provincial

1995 Ontario general election: Brantford
Party	Candidate	Votes	%	±%	Expenditures
Progressive Conservative	Ron Johnson	13,745	41.01	+32.54	$36,072
Liberal	Dave Neumann	10,418	31.08	–6.33	$25,897
New Democratic	Brad Ward	8,165	24.36	–24.27	$41,119
Family Coalition	Paul Vandervet	762	2.27	–1.60	$776
Green	William Darfler	430	1.28	+0.09	$622
Total valid votes		33,520	99.15		
Total rejected, unmarked and declined ballots		288	0.85	+0.07	
Turnout		33,808	59.90	–6.81	
Eligible voters		56,445			
Progressive Conservative gain from New Democratic		Swing		+28.41	
Source: Elections Ontario

1990 Ontario general election: Brantford
Party	Candidate	Votes	%	±%	Expenditures
New Democratic	Brad Ward	17,736	48.63	+15.11	$28,075
Liberal	Dave Neumann	13,644	37.41	–3.88	$35,029
Progressive Conservative	Daniel Di Sabatino	3,087	8.46	–16.73	$7,083
Family Coalition	Peter Quail	1,413	3.87	–	$7,153
Green	William Darfler	436	1.20	–	$0
Libertarian	Helmut Kurmis	158	0.43	–	$0
Total valid votes/expenditure limit		36,474	99.22	–	$47,526
Total rejected, unmarked and declined ballots		286	0.78	+0.30	
Turnout		36,760	66.71	–2.09	
Eligible voters		55,106			
New Democratic gain from Liberal		Swing		+9.49	
Source: Elections Ontario

1987 Ontario general election: Brantford
Party	Candidate	Votes	%	±%	Expenditures
Liberal	Dave Neumann	14,919	41.29	+21.05	$35,227
New Democratic	Jack Tubman	12,112	33.52	–4.59	$33,914
Progressive Conservative	Phil Gillies	9,104	25.19	–16.45	$42,033
Total valid votes/expenditure limit		36,135	99.52	–	$46,944
Total rejected ballots		175	0.48	+0.13	
Turnout		36,310	68.80	+4.03	
Eligible voters		52,776			
Liberal gain from Progressive Conservative		Swing		+12.82	
Source: Elections Ontario

1971 Ontario general election: Brant
Party	Candidate	Votes	%	±%
Liberal	Robert Nixon	8,846	50.98	–6.23
Progressive Conservative	J. Pryor Harris	5,147	29.66	–0.74
New Democratic	Dave Neumann	3,359	19.36	+6.97
Total valid votes		17,352	99.54	
Total rejected ballots		81	0.46	–0.02
Turnout		17,433	73.31	+5.87
Eligible voters		23,780		
Liberal hold		Swing		–2.75
Source: Elections Ontario

Municipal

2010 Brantford municipal election: Councillor, Ward Five (two members elected)
Candidate	Votes	%
(x)Marguerite Ceschi-Smith	2,345	32.11
Dave Neumann	1,206	16.52
Dwight A. Ayerhart	1,102	15.09
(x)John K. Bradford	867	11.87
Tim Philp	765	10.48
Stephen C. Morris	599	8.20
Chris Markell	311	4.26
Donald R. Haddow	107	1.47
Total valid votes	7,302	100

2000 Brantford municipal election: Mayor of Brantford
Candidate	Votes	%
(x)Chris Friel	13,251	45.60
John Starkey	9,586	32.99
Dave Neumann	4,015	13.82
Kevin Raymond	1,777	6.12
Winston C. Ferguson	245	0.84
Joseph Robert Gallant	185	0.64
Total valid votes	29,059	100

1985 Brantford municipal election: Mayor of Brantford
Candidate	Votes	%
(x)Dave Neumann	14,285	83.77
William Stewart	1,589	9.32
Andy Woolley	1,178	6.91
Total valid votes	17,052	100

1982 Brantford municipal election: Mayor of Brantford
Candidate	Votes	%
(x)Dave Neumann	16,267	75.68
Yvonne McMahon	1,638	7.62
William Stewart	1,136	5.28
Robert MacKeigan	1,014	4.72
Andy Woolley	954	4.44
Lenny Kerr	486	2.27
Total valid votes	21,495	100

1980 Brantford municipal election: Mayor of Brantford
Candidate	Votes	%
Dave Neumann	9,099	40.41
Andy Woodburn	7,948	35.30
(x)Charles Bowen	5,024	22.32
Andy Woolley	443	1.97
Total valid votes	22,514	100

1978 Brantford municipal election: Councillor, Ward Five (two members elected)
Candidate	Votes	%
(x)Dave Neumann	accl.	-
(x)Doug Reeves	accl.	-

1976 Brantford municipal election: Councillor, Ward Five (two members elected)
Candidate	Votes	%
Doug Reeves	1,538	33.22
Dave Neumann	1,072	23.15
Ernie Fish	757	16.35
(x)Wynn Harding	591	12.76
Charles McPhail	435	9.40
Yvonne McMahon	237	5.12
Total valid votes	4,630	100

1972 Brantford municipal election: Councillor, Ward Four (two members elected)
Candidate	Votes	%
James C. Kent	2,834	36.49
(x)Charles Ward	1,745	22.47
Dave Neumann	1,642	21.14
Jack Arnold	757	9.75
Arne Zabell	489	6.30
George AuCoin	300	3.86
Total valid votes	7,767	100
