= Brantford City Hall =

Municipal building in Ontario, Canada

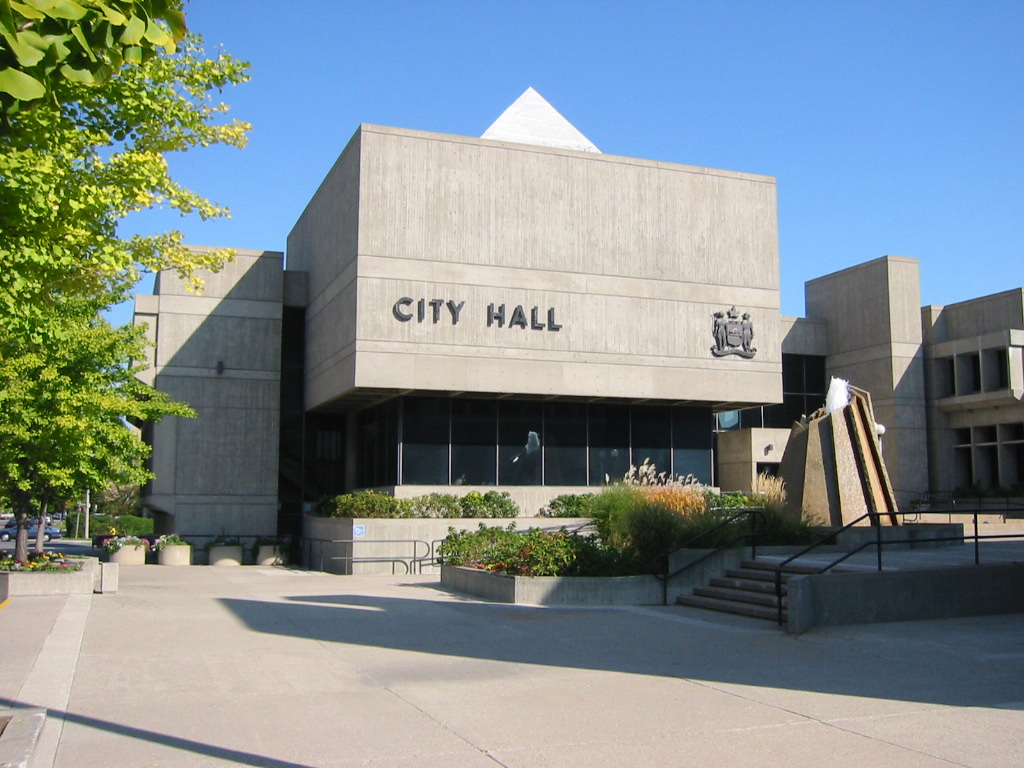

- Location within Ontario

General information
- Architectural style: Brutalist
- Location: 100 Wellington Square, Brantford, Ontario, Canada
- Coordinates: 43°08′31″N 80°15′44″W
- Elevation: 212 metres (696 ft)
- Completed: 1967

Design and construction
- Architect: Michael Kopsa

Brantford City Hall is the home of the municipal government of Brantford, Ontario, Canada. The building is located at 100 Wellington Square.

Designed by Michael Kopsa and built in 1967, it is exemplary of Brutalist architecture. It has been home to Brantford City Council since its move from Brantford Town Hall (built 1849), which served the city from 1877 to 1967.

The old town hall was demolished along with Market Square to make way for current Eaton Market Square retail complex.
