= Brant County Roman Catholic School Board =

School board in Ontario, Canada

The Brant County Roman Catholic School Board was a separate school board in the Canadian province of Ontario, based in the city of Brantford and the surrounding Brant County. In 1997, it was amalgamated into the new Brant Haldimand Norfolk Catholic District School Board.
