= 1972 Brantford municipal election =

The 1972 Brantford municipal election was held on December 4, 1972, to elect a mayor, councillors, school trustees, and public utility commissioners in the city of Brantford, Ontario, Canada.

Charles Bowen was elected to his first term as mayor.

== Results ==
1972 Brantford municipal election: Mayor of Brantford
Candidate	Votes	%
Charles Bowen	8,703	42.98
Ronald Stockdale	6,254	30.88
Howard Minard	4,774	23.58
Karl Edmison	519	2.56
Total valid votes	20,250	100

1972 Brantford municipal election: Councillor, Ward Three (two members elected)
Candidate	Votes	%
(x)Vic Symes	2,134	25.09
Patrick Luciani	1,779	20.91
Bill Painter	1,442	16.95
Freeman Farrington	1,392	16.36
Orville Kerlew	1,174	13.80
Norman Pauwels	586	6.89
Total valid votes	8,507	100

1972 Brantford municipal election: Councillor, Ward Four (two members elected)
Candidate	Votes	%
James C. Kent	2,834	36.49
(x)Charles Ward	1,745	22.47
Dave Neumann	1,642	21.14
Jack Arnold	757	9.75
Arne Zabell	489	6.30
George AuCoin	300	3.86
Total valid votes	7,767	100

- John Robert (Jack) Arnold (died August 13, 2010) was born in Brantford, served in the Canadian Navy during his youth (including a stint in Halifax, Nova Scotia during World War II), and later returned to Brantford to become a businessman in the city. He also became a pilot in the 1960s, worked in aviation history, and restored several vintage planes. He died in 2010, at age eighty-three.

1972 Brantford municipal election: Brant County Roman Catholic School Board, City of Brantford (eight members elected)
Candidate	Votes	%
(x)Fred Grundy	1,953	12.30
(x)V.W. McNamara	1,884	11.87
(x)Keith Sims	1,374	8.65
(x)Steve Kukulski	1,364	8.59
(x)Margaret McDonald	1,286	8.10
John Curran	1,244	7.83
(x)Jack Griffin	1,086	6.84
Moe Boire	1,022	6.44
Vincent Bucci	1,020	6.42
Paula Clark	952	6.00
Daniel McPhee	925	5.83
Michael Whalen	887	5.59
Bill Shock	881	5.55
Total valid votes	15,878	100

Note: Vincent Bucci's city council page indicates that he won the final seat following a recount.

Source: Brantford Expositor, 5 December 1972.
