= 1976 Brantford municipal election =

The 1976 Brantford municipal election was held on December 6, 1976, to elect a mayor, councillors, and school trustees in Brantford, Ontario, Canada. The rural and small-town communities near Brantford also held elections on the same day.

Charles Bowen was elected to a third two-year term as mayor of Brantford.

== Results ==
1976 Brantford municipal election: Mayor of Brantford
Candidate	Votes	%
(x)Charles Bowen	14,108	78.64
Kenneth McColeman	3,831	21.36
Total valid votes	17,939	100

1976 Brantford municipal election: Councillor, Ward One (two members elected)
Candidate	Votes	%
Jo Brennan	1,567	30.05
(x)Douglas McNicol	1,300	24.93
John Starkey	1,152	22.09
John Sless	917	17.58
Norman Greenfield	279	5.35
Total valid votes	5,215	100

1976 Brantford municipal election: Councillor, Ward Three (two members elected)
Candidate	Votes	%
(x)Mabel Cooper	2,450	27.66
Max Sherman	2,250	25.40
Michael Woodburn	2,179	24.60
Howard Minard	1,707	19.27
Raymond Lever	271	3.06
Total valid votes	8,857	100

1976 Brantford municipal election: Councillor, Ward Four (two members elected)
Candidate	Votes	%
Andy Woodburn	1,928	30.26
(x)Charles Ward	1,330	20.87
Ross Baker	1,274	19.99
(x)Paul Randorf	1,210	18.99
Ronald Finucan	630	9.89
Total valid votes	6,372	100

1976 Brantford municipal election: Councillor, Ward Five (two members elected)
Candidate	Votes	%
Doug Reeves	1,538	33.22
Dave Neumann	1,072	23.15
Ernie Fish	757	16.35
(x)Wynn Harding	591	12.76
Charles McPhail	435	9.40
Yvonne McMahon	237	5.12
Total valid votes	4,630	100

- Ernie Fish was active with the Brant Naval Veterans Association. He was, like Dave Neumann, supported by the United Auto Workers.
- Wynn Harding was elected to the Brantford City Council in 1974 but was defeated in 1976. She later worked as a freelance writer and was active with the University Women's Club of Brantford.

1976 Brantford municipal election: Brant County Board of Education, City of Brantford (eight members elected)
Candidate	Votes	%
Dick Verrity	9,902	12.89
(x)Grant Darling	6,955	9.05
(x)Edward D. Pass	6,589	8.58
Karen George	6,493	8.45
Melodie Daboll	6,391	8.32
K. Keith Brett	5,015	6.53
Kaye Davies	4,907	6.39
John K. Lewis	4,774	6.21
(x)F.M. Farrington	4,617	6.01
Ray M. Waghorn	4,479	5.83
Barbara Harvey	2,904	3.78
(x)M.L. Pete Kilgore	2,885	3.76
Dennis Finucan	2,652	3.45
James Friel	2,539	3.31
John G. Henry	2,185	2.84
Daniel O'Regan	1,957	2.55
Chester Phillips	1,578	2.05
Total valid votes	76,822	100

- James Friel was the father of Chris Friel, who served as mayor of Brantford from 1994 to 2003 and was elected to the same position again in 2010. James died of lung cancer at age forty-three, due in large part to a lifelong habit of heavy smoking. In 2002, Chris Friel cited his father's illness and death as reasons for supporting a municipal anti-smoking by-law.

1976 Brantford municipal election: Brant County Roman Catholic School Board, City of Brantford (eight members elected)
Candidate	Votes	%
(x)John Lambertus	2,432	15.04
(x)Jack Paleczny	2,094	12.95
(x)Fred Grundy	1,777	10.99
(x)Margaret McDonald	1,496	9.25
(x)Vincent Bucci	1,431	8.85
(x)John Griffin	1,312	8.12
Moe Boire	1,228	7.60
(x)Keith Sims	1,187	7.34
Joseph Quinto	1,118	6.92
Bob Adie	1,110	6.87
W. Paul Ferriss	980	6.06
Total valid votes	16,165	100
