= 1974 Brantford municipal election =

The 1974 Brantford municipal election took place on December 2, 1974, to elect a mayor, councillors, and school trustees in Brantford, Ontario, Canada. Elections also took place in the rural and small-town communities surrounding Brantford.

Charles Bowen was elected to a second two-year term as the mayor of Brantford.

== Results ==
1974 Brantford municipal election: Mayor of Brantford
Candidate	Votes	%
(x)Charles Bowen	10,660	58.02
Ronald Stockdale	6,364	34.64
Gerry Risser	1,348	7.34
Total valid votes	18,372	100

1974 Brantford municipal election: Councillor, Ward One (two members elected)
Candidate	Votes	%
Doug McNicol	1,706	31.76
(x)Walter Halyk	1,641	30.55
(x)Howard Jones	1,463	27.23
John Sless	360	6.70
Robert Martinow	202	3.76
Total valid votes	5,372	100

1974 Brantford municipal election: Councillor, Ward Three (two members elected)
Candidate	Votes	%
Mabel Cooper	2,360	30.71
(x)Pat Luciani	1,711	22.26
(x)Vic Symes	1,609	20.94
William Humble	1,093	14.22
John Tubman	912	11.87
Total valid votes	7,685	100

1974 Brantford municipal election: Councillor, Ward Five (two members elected)
Candidate	Votes	%
Mac Makarchuk	1,480	39.01
Wynn Harding	1,216	32.05
Bev Lavelle	1,098	28.94
Total valid votes	3,794	100

- Bev Lavelle, who finished third in the 1974 election, was appointed to the Brantford City Council to replace Mac Makarchuk after he was elected to the Legislative Assembly of Ontario in 1975. She resigned from council in October 1976 and was not a candidate in the 1976 municipal election.
