= Charles Bowen (Ontario politician) =

Canadian politician (1923–1992)

Charles R. Bowen (1923 – May 17, 1992) was a politician in the Canadian province of Ontario. He served as mayor of Brantford from 1973 to 1980.

Bowen was born in Oshawa and served in the Canadian army for five years during World War II. He graduated from the Canadian Institute of Science and Technology as a mechanical engineer. Bowen later received a Theology degree from McMaster University in 1977 and was ordained at the city's First Baptist Church later in the year.

Bowen first ran for municipal office in Brantford in 1958 and was first elected to council in 1963, when he won a seat in Brantford's fifth ward. He served as a councillor until being elected as mayor of Brantford in the 1972 municipal election. He was re-elected in 1974, 1976, and 1978.

Bowen and alderman William Tovell were sued by the Boston Pops Orchestra in 1978, following non-payment for an August 1978 concert to raise money for Brantford's Capital Theatre. The business manager for Boston Pops charged that Bowen had guaranteed on the night of the concert that the sixty thousand dollar fee would be guaranteed by the city. Bowen denied that he had made this promise, and his claim was supported the city solicitor. The case was settled out of court in 1981. Arthur Kelly Jr., the son of the concert organizer, later wrote that Bowen had promised the money would be paid after overhearing a conversation between his father and the orchestra's business manager. Kelly added that the Pops was aware of the concert's shaky financial status and asserted that "if Bowen had kept his mouth shut [...] there would have been no lawsuit."

Bowen was defeated by challenger Dave Neumann in 1980. He was re-elected to council in 1988 and served another three-year term before being defeated in 1991. He died the following year.
