= Brantford Public Utilities Commission =

Former municipal commission in Brantford, Ontario, Canada

The Brantford Public Utilities Commission was the municipal public utilities commission for Brantford, Ontario, Canada. Once a powerful body in the city, it was dismantled in 1996 and eliminated entirely in 2001 (25 years ago).

The commission oversaw hydro and water services, and after 1935 it also looked after the city's public transportation system. It was overseen for many years by a team of elected commissioners, who represented different wards in the city.

The Brantford City Council passed a by-law in 1996 that dismembered the commission. After heated discussions and a series of lawsuits, the city took over water and transit services directly and set up the Brantford Hydro-Electric Commission to oversee hydro services.

City council shut down the latter commission in 2001, two years after the provincial government of Mike Harris changed the oversight of public utilities to encourage deregulation and privatization. Brantford originally planned to sell the service outright, but instead set up Brantford Power and related corporations to run it. City councillor Richard Carpenter criticized this decision, saying that it could result in private-sector control and higher rates without proper oversight.
