= Brantford and District Labour Council =

The Brantford and District Labour Council is a labour council in Brantford, Ontario, chartered by the Canadian Labour Congress.
