= 1978 Brantford municipal election =

The 1978 Brantford municipal election was held on November 13, 1978, to elect a mayor, councillors, and school trustees in Brantford, Ontario, Canada. Elections were also held in the rural and small-town communities surrounding the city.

Charles Bowen was narrowly re-elected to a fourth two-year term as mayor, defeating rival candidate Jo Brennan.

== Results ==
1978 Brantford municipal election: Mayor of Brantford
Candidate	Votes	%
(x)Charles Bowen	9,968	49.20
Jo Brennan	8,823	43.55
Andy Woolley	946	4.67
William Stewart	522	2.58
Total valid votes	20,259	100

1978 Brantford municipal election: Councillor, Ward One (two members elected)
Candidate	Votes	%
John Starkey	2,092	27.21
Deborah O'Connell	2,032	26.43
(x)Bill Tovell	2,019	26.26
Gordon Adams	1,286	16.73
John Steer	259	3.37
Total valid votes	7,688	100

1978 Brantford municipal election: Councillor, Ward Three (two members elected)
Candidate	Votes	%
(x)Max Sherman	accl.	-
Mike Woodburn	accl.	-

- Mike Woodburn was elected to city council in 1978 following a failed bid in 1976 and served for one term. He is the brother of Andy Woodburn, who served on council from 1976 to 1980 and again from 1982 to 1997.

1978 Brantford municipal election: Councillor, Ward Four (two members elected)
Candidate	Votes	%
(x)Andy Woodburn	1,972	36.19
(x)Charles Ward	1,327	24.35
Ross Baker	1,117	20.50
Mike Sosteric	598	10.97
Enid Green	435	7.98
Total valid votes	5,449	100

1978 Brantford municipal election: Councillor, Ward Five (two members elected)
Candidate	Votes	%
(x)Dave Neumann	accl.	-
(x)Doug Reeves	accl.	-

- Doug Reeves was elected to Brantford City Council for the city's fifth ward in 1976 and was re-elected without opposition in 1978. In January 1978, he spoke against a proposed anti-smoking by-law. Reeves later served as the Brant County area director for Legal Aid Ontario. He also chaired Brantford's downtown Business Improvement Area in the 1990s, and he welcomed the arrival of more police officers to the neighbourhood in 1999.
