= Laurier Brantford =

Campus of Wilfrid Laurier University in Ontario, Canada

Brantford Campus of Wilfrid Laurier University
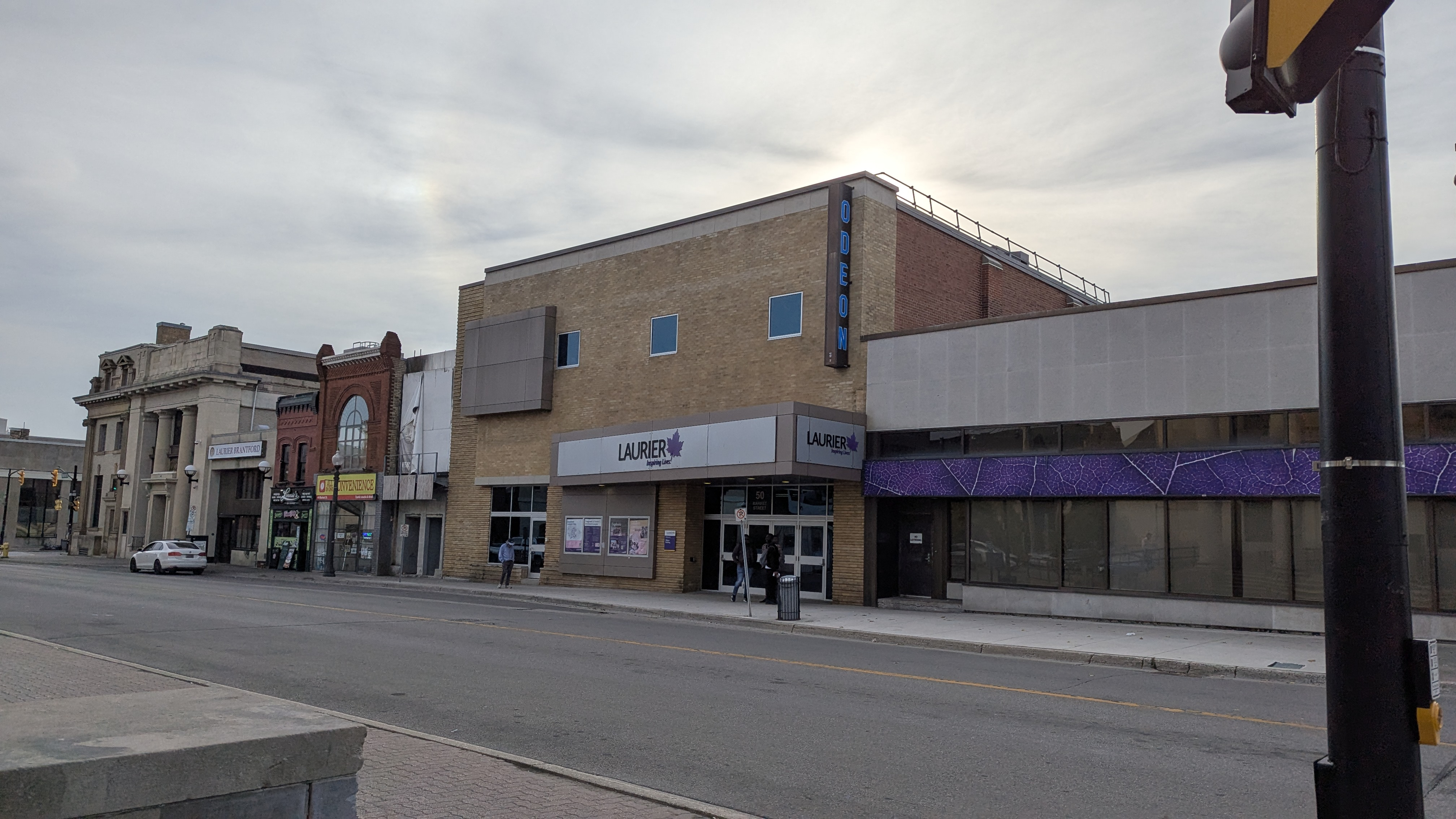
- Laurier Brantford's Odeon Building (in foreground) on Market Street in downtown Brantford
- Other name: Laurier Brantford
- Type: Campus of Wilfrid Laurier University
- Established: 1999; 27 years ago
- Undergraduates: ~3,000
- Location: Brantford, Ontario, Canada; 43.1400°N 80.2616°W
- Nickname: Brantford Golden Hawks
- Sporting affiliations: CCAA – OCAA
- Website: Official website

The Brantford Campus, commonly known as Laurier Brantford, is a campus of Wilfrid Laurier University in Brantford, Ontario, Canada. Laurier follows a 'multicampus' structure, as it is one university with multiple campuses. The university's other campuses are located in Milton, Ontario, and Waterloo, Ontario.

Laurier Brantford opened its doors in 1999 with a total of only 39 students in its inaugural year. By January 2015, there were 2,625 full-time students, and an unstated number of part-time students. At that time, some reduction was expected for the 2015/2016 year because Nipissing University would not be accepting new students to the joint concurrent (BA/BEd) education program with Laurier in September 2015. By the time of the 2017/2018 year, Laurier estimated a total of over 3,000 students at the Brantford campus.

In June 2017, the university graduated its 5,000th student from the Brantford campus.

In June 2025, the university graduated its 10,000th student from the Brantford campus.

== Campus ==
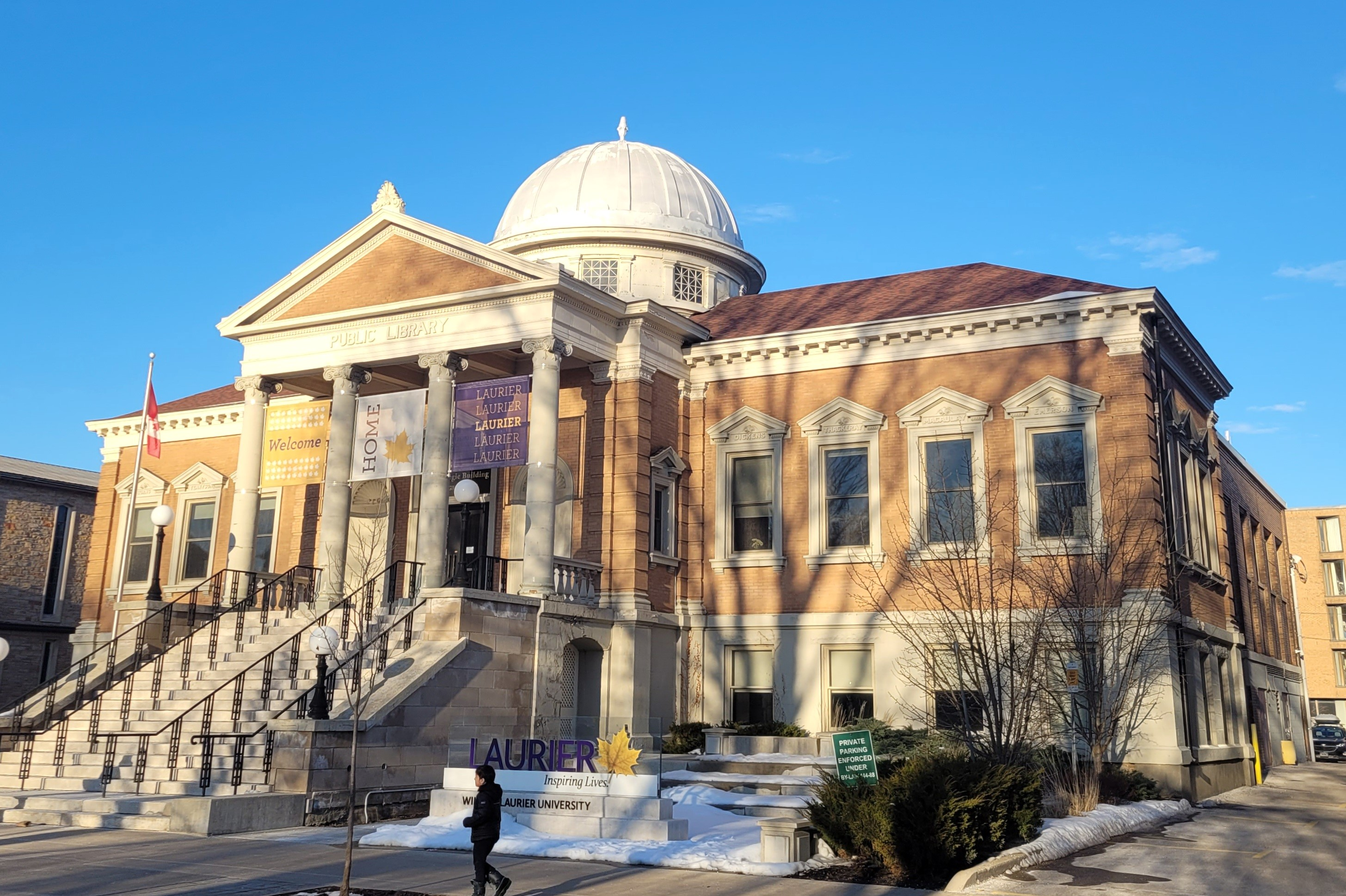
The Carnegie Building on George Street

Laurier's campus is integrated into the Brantford downtown, with its main building being the Carnegie Building on George Street. The campus has since expanded and has several academic and residence buildings. Research and Academic Centre, Wilfrid Laurier Student's Union, Grand River Hall, Lucy Marco Place, Post House, Wilkes House, the Laurier Brantford YMCA, One Market, the Odeon building and the Carnegie Building are all properties of Laurier Brantford and are used as academic theaters, residences, book store and a gym facility.

== Residences ==
As of the 2016-2017 academic year, Laurier Brantford had six residence communities: Lawyer's Hall, Expositor Building, Grand River Hall, Post House, Wilkes House and Lucy Marco Place. All residences are apartment-style; 80% of bedrooms are singles.

== Curriculum ==
Laurier Brantford's curriculum is offered by two faculties. The Faculty of Human and Social Sciences includes courses in Criminology, Game Design and Development, Health Studies, Leadership, Policing and Psychology. The Faculty of Liberal Arts houses Society, Culture and Environment (formerly Contemporary Studies), User Experience Design, History, English, Youth and Children's Studies, Foundations, Human Rights and Human Diversity, Indigenous Studies, Languages at Brantford and Law and Society programs.

Another program, Foundations, administered jointly by the two faculties, provides a curriculum that introduces students to common themes in social sciences and humanities research and lays the foundation for building necessary critical thinking and communication skills for university success. To graduate from this program, students must complete Modernity and the Contemporary World, Modernity: Critique and Resistance, Academic Literacy: Social Sciences and Academic Literacy: Humanities.

According to Maclean's, Laurier's "Standout Programs" in 2017-2018 included Game Design and Development at the Brantford campus. "The program develops skills not only in game design, project management and entrepreneurship, but also considers how transformative games are used in areas such as education, corporate training, health care and more."

Laurier Brantford offers Honours Bachelors programs (2015/2016) in Community Health, Criminology, English, Health Administration, History, Human Rights & Human Diversity, Law & Society, Society, Culture & Environment, Youth & Children's Studies, Digital Media & Journalism, Game Design & Development, Public Health, Psychology, Business Technology Management, Policing and Social Work. Students can pursue a number of combination Honours degrees.

A September 2017 report indicated that the Brantford campus offered several recently added programs, including:

- LLB (University of Sussex) and BA (Laurier) in either Criminology, Law & Society, or Human Rights & Human Diversity; six-year program
- Bachelor of Fine and Applied Arts in Game Design & Development
- Bachelor of Arts in Indigenous Studies (must be combined with another major)
- Bachelor of Arts in Policing (must be combined with another major)
- Bachelor of Design in User Experience Design
- Bachelor of Arts in Labour Studies & Career Development

Other programs available at the time included Bachelor of Business Technology Management; Bachelor of Arts in community health; criminology; digital media & journalism; English; health administration; history; human rights & human diversity; law & society; psychology; social & environmental justice; youth & children's studies; Bachelor of Arts and Science in public health and Bachelor of Social Work.

== Laurier/Nipissing programme ==
For some years, Laurier students could take a concurrent BA/BEd (five year) program with Nipissing University Brantford. On November 16, 2014, Nipissing announced that it would wind down its operations in the city in the wake of changes to funding for education programs. As of November 10, 2015, there were 622 such Laurier/Nipissing students. No new students were admitted for the 2015–16 academic year and the partnership will officially end once the last cohort of current students completes the program in 2019.

Students who had started in the programme in 2014/2015 or earlier were able to complete the program, but no new students were accepted since the programme was winding down. Because of that change, Laurier Brantford was expecting about 125 fewer students to be on campus in September 2015.

In spite of that reduction, the university was anticipating long-term growth in that city. "... Laurier's plans for growth are supported by its partnership with Conestoga College and significant investments in infrastructure that will continue to make Brantford an important destination for post-secondary education students," according to Brian Rosborough, senior executive officer, Brantford Campus. That optimism was warranted since by the June 1, 2015 deadline for confirmations the number of applicants who had accepted an offer of admission for first-year study in 2015–2016 at Laurier Brantford rose by 24.1 per cent (or by 611 students) over the previous year.

== Library ==
A significant challenge faced by any university starting a new campus location is to create a new library that is as useful as the one on their Waterloo campus. That can take many years, especially when the enrolment at the new campus is still quite low. Laurier Brantford has yet to meet that goal but it has established a partnership with the public library, which houses about 10,000 volumes in the Laurier collection and is open seven days a week (except on statutory holidays).

The library also provides access to a system that contains the combined catalogues of the universities of Laurier, Guelph and Waterloo that are accessible to both students and the public. The materials are sent electronically or by deliveries made regularly to the library.

The university also opened a "digital learning commons" in Grand River Hall in early 2014. The university's two librarians moved there from their previous office in the neighbouring Brantford Public Library. However, no current plan has been announced for the creation of a dedicated library, exclusively for Laurier students in Brantford.
