= Elements Casino Brantford =

Casino in Ontario, Canada

Coordinates: 43.138072°N 80.268173°W

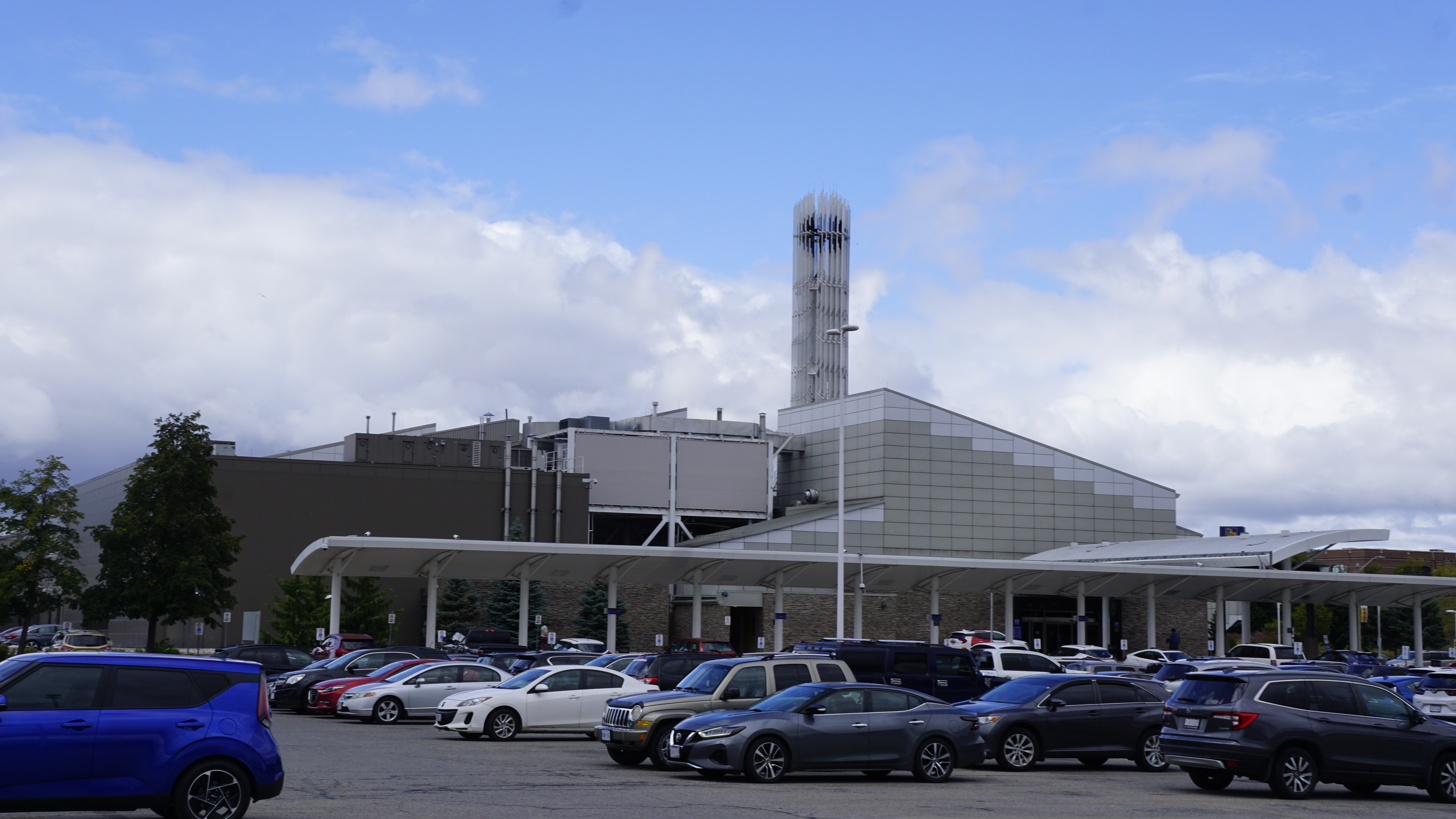
- Interactive map of Elements Casino Brantford
- Location: Brantford, Ontario, Canada; 40 Icomm Drive
- Opened: 1999; 27 years ago
- Owner: Great Canadian Entertainment
- Previous names: Brantford Charity Casino; OLG Casino Brantford
- Website: greatcanadian.com/destinations/ontario/elements/

Elements Casino Brantford, formerly known as OLG Casino Brantford, and prior to that the Brantford Charity Casino, is a charity casino located in Brantford, Ontario.

== Summary ==
Since its opening in 1999, the casino has drawn a small number of tourists into this city, though far fewer than was first predicted since numerous other casinos have been opened nearby and slot machines have been added to area racetracks.

A portion of profits from this and other Ontario charity casinos goes to the Trillium Foundation and to the City of Brantford as host. Casino Brantford has 55 table games, including blackjack, baccarat, Let It Ride, Sic Bo, Three card poker, Spanish 21, roulette, and craps, along with numerous slot machines and a 14-table Texas Hold 'Em poker room.

It is located near the Sanderson Centre for the Performing Arts, an upscale theater.

In May 2018 management of the casino was taken over by Great Canadian Gaming and the name was changed to Elements Casino Brantford.

== See also ==
- List of casinos in Canada
