= 1980 Brantford municipal election =

The 1980 Brantford municipal election was held on November 10, 1980, to elect a mayor, councillors, and school trustees in Brantford, Ontario, Canada. Elections were also held in the rural and small-town areas surrounding the city.

Dave Neumann defeated right-wing candidate Andy Woodburn and incumbent Charles Bowen to be elected as mayor.

== Results ==
1980 Brantford municipal election: Mayor of Brantford
Candidate	Votes	%
Dave Neumann	9,099	40.41
Andy Woodburn	7,948	35.30
(x)Charles Bowen	5,024	22.32
Andy Woolley	443	1.97
Total valid votes	22,514	100

1980 Brantford municipal election: Councillor, Ward One (two members elected)
Candidate	Votes	%
(x)John Starkey	2,280	30.67
(x)Deborah O'Connell	2,257	30.36
Jo Brennan	1,647	22.15
Don Francis	1,251	16.83
Total valid votes	7,435	100

1980 Brantford municipal election: Councillor, Ward Four (two members elected)
Candidate	Votes	%
(x)Charles Ward	1,806	32.44
Larry Kings	1,235	22.18
Enid Green	1,008	18.11
Mary Hourigan	774	13.90
Malcolm MacAlpine	744	13.36
Total valid votes	5,567	100

- Charles Ward (died April 14, 1982) was a farmer and union activist. He moved to Canada from England in 1908 to work with Cockshutt Farm Equipment, later worked for Massey-Harris Co., and was the founding president of United Auto Workers Local 458 in Brantford. Ward was first elected to the Brantford City Council in 1952 and served continuously until his death, except for the years 1959-60. He ran unsuccessfully for mayor of Brantford in 1958. In 1963, he was named Brantford Citizen of the Year. A 1980 newspaper article described him as the oldest elected official in Canada. He suffered a stroke in November 1981 that left him unable to fulfill his municipal duties; the Brantford City Council chose not to replace him in honour of his record of service. He died in 1982, at age ninety-one. Charles Ward Park in Brantford is named in his honour.
