= List of mayors of Brantford =

This is a list of mayors of the city of Brantford, Ontario, Canada.

Until 1956 mayors were elected for one year terms. Beginning in 1957, mayoral terms were extended to two years by Ontario law. In 1987, the provincial government changed the Municipal Elections Act to require local government elections every three years.

== Town of Brantford (1847–1876) ==
1. William Muirhead, 1847
2. Dr. Alfred Digby, 1848–1849
3. Philip Cady VanBrocklin, 1850
4. John Henry Moore, 1851
5. Arunah Huntington, 1852
6. George Samuel Wilkes, 1853
7. James Kerby, 1854
8. William Mathews, 1855–1856
9. Thomas Botham, 1857
10. Matthew William Pruyn, 1858
11. Thomas Botham, 1859 (second time)
12. Joseph Duffett Clement, 1860–1863
13. James Weyms, 1864–1865
14. John Elliott, 1866–1868
15. William Mathews, 1869–1871 (second time)
16. William Paterson, 1872
17. William Mathews, 1873–1874 (third time)
18. Dr. James W. Digby, 1875–1876

== City of Brantford (1877–Present) ==
1. Dr. James W. Digby, 1877 (second time)
2. Robert Henry, 1878–1879
3. Reginald Henwood, 1880–1881
4. William Watt, 1882–1883
5. William J. Scarfe, 1884–1885
6. Charles B. Heyd, 1886
7. Robert Henry, 1887 (second time)
8. Charles B. Heyd, 1888–1889 (second time)
9. Samuel G. Read, 1890–1891
10. Levi Secord, 1892–1893
11. George Watt, 1894–1895
12. Thomas Elliott, 1896–1897
13. W. G. Raymond, 1898–1899
14. Harry Cockshutt, 1900
15. D. B. Wood, 1901–1902
16. Matthew K. Halloran, 1903–1904
17. Charles Waterous, 1905–1906
18. J. W. Bowlby, 1907–1908
19. W. B. Wood, 1909–1910
20. Ross A. Rastall, 1911
21. Charles H. Hartman, 1912–1913
22. John H. Spence, 1914–1915
23. J. W. Bowlby, 1916–1917
24. M. M. MacBride, 1918–1920
25. George Wedlake, 1921–1922 (Wedlake died March 3, 1922. C.J. Parker completed the term.)
26. C.J. Parker, 1922
27. Frederic W. Billo, 1923-1924
28. M. M. MacBride, 1925
29. J.A.D. Slemin, 1926-1927
30. Ross L. Beckett, 1928-1932
31. M. M. MacBride, 1933-1934
32. Col MA Colquhoun, 1935
33. M. M. MacBride, 1936–1937
34. R. J. Waterous, 1938–1940
35. John P. Ryan, 1941–1945
36. John H. Matthews, 1946–1947
37. W. J. Dowden, 1948–1949
38. Howard E. Winter, 1950–1953
39. Reg Cooper, 1954–1956
40. Howard E. Winter, 1956 (second time)
41. Max Sherman, 1957–1958
42. Lloyd D. Hogarth, 1959–1960
43. Richard Beckett, 1961–1970
44. Howard E. Winter, 1971–1972 (third time)
45. Charles Bowen, 1973–1980
46. David Neumann, 1980–1987 (Neuman resigned in October 1987 after being elected to the Legislative Assembly of Ontario. Karen George completed the term.)
47. Karen George, 1987–1991
48. Bob Taylor, 1991–1994
49. Chris Friel, 1994–2003
50. Mike Hancock, 2003–2010
51. Chris Friel, 2010–2018
52. Kevin Davis, 3 December 2018 – present
