= Mike Hancock (Canadian politician) =

Canadian politician

Mike Hancock is a former mayor of the city of Brantford, Ontario, Canada. He was elected to the position in the 2003 municipal elections, defeating three-term incumbent Chris Friel by 11,668 votes to 11,653. He did not stand for re-election in 2010 municipal elections and was replaced by the returning Friel.

Born in Toronto and educated at York University, Hancock worked for Dun & Bradstreet of Canada as an analyst and then manager from 1961 to 1971. From 1971 until his retirement in 1998, he took a series of senior positions in the federal government's employment department. He moved to Brantford in 1981.

== Brantford leadership ==
Hancock was first elected as Ward Three city councillor in 1988, and re-elected continuously until his mayoral run. Hancock took a fiscally conservative position on municipal tax levels and advocated for the reduction of the city's debt, which was eliminated. He chaired the council's finance committee from its formation in 1990 until a new structure for committees in 1998; from 1999 to 2003 he chaired the Corporate Services Sector Committee; in 2002, the city became debt-free.

From 1998 to 2003, he was executive director of the Brant Skills Development Group, supporting skills training for youth in Brant County.

In his 2003 Inaugural Address, he identified council's top challenges as developing new industrial lands, and revitalizing Brantford's downtown, especially by growing to accommodate Brantford's rapidly growing population of post-secondary students and by reconditioning brownfield lands.
