= Brantford City Council =

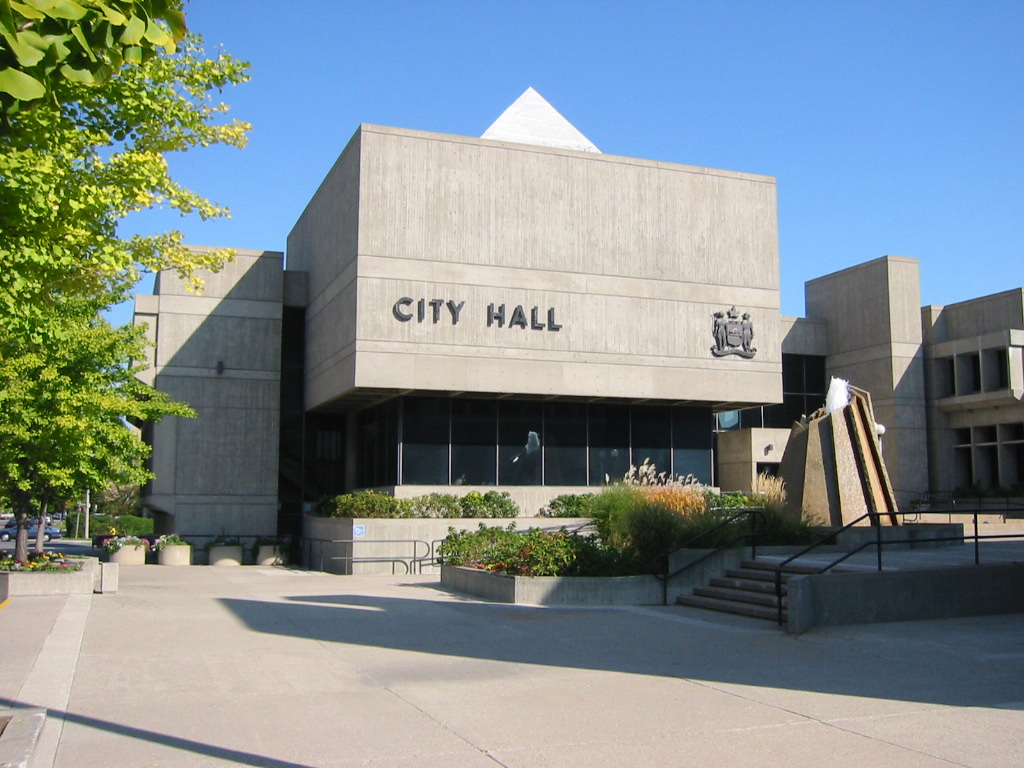
Brantford City Hall

Brantford City Council is the governing body of Brantford, Ontario.

The council consists of a mayor and ten councillors, two representing each of five wards. The city council elections are held every four years and the citizens and community members of Brantford vote for their candidates, who are eligible to be confirmed by majority of popular votes.

The first city council of Brantford was inaugurated on June 18, 1877.

== 2022-2026 ==
Council elected in the October 24, 2022 municipal election

Councillor	Ward
Kevin Davis	Mayor
Michael Sullivan	Ward 1
Rose Sicoli	Ward 1
John Sless	Ward 2
Gino Caputo	Ward 2
Greg Martin	Ward 3
Dan McCreary	Ward 3
Linda Hunt	Ward 4
Richard Carpenter	Ward 4
Mandy Samwell	Ward 5
Brian Van Tilborg	Ward 5

== 2018-2022 ==
Council elected in the October 22, 2018 municipal election

Councillor	Ward	Notes
Kevin Davis	Mayor	
Jan Vanderdstelt	Ward 1	
Rick Weaver	Ward 1 (Resignation: October 29, 2021	
Rose Sicoli	Ward 1 (Appointed: December 11, 2021	
John Sless	Ward 2	
John Utley	Ward 2	
Greg Martin	Ward 3	
Dan McCreary	Ward 3	
Cheryl Antoski	Ward 4	
Richard Carpenter	Ward 4	
Joshua Wall	Ward 5	
Brian Van Tilborg	Ward 5	

== 2014-2018 ==
Council elected in the October 27, 2014 municipal election

Councillor	Ward	Notes
Chris Friel	Mayor	
Larry Kings	Ward 1	
Rick Weaver	Ward 1	
John Sless	Ward 2	
John Utley	Ward 2	
Greg Martin	Ward 3	
Dan McCreary	Ward 3	
Cheryl Antoski	Ward 4	
Richard Carpenter	Ward 4	
Dave Neumann	Ward 5	
Brian Van Tilborg	Ward 5	

== 2010-2014 ==
Council elected in the 2010 municipal election:

Councillor	Ward	Notes
Chris Friel	Mayor	
Larry Kings	Ward 1	
Jan Vander Stelt	Ward 1	
Vince Bucci	Ward 2	
John Utley	Ward 2	
Debi Dignan-Rumble	Ward 3	
Dan McCreary	Ward 3	
Richard Carpenter	Ward 4	
Dave Wrobel	Ward 4	
Marguerite Ceschi-Smith	Ward 5	
Dave Neumann	Ward 5	

== 2006-2010 ==
Council elected in the 2006 municipal election:

Councillor	Ward	Notes
Mike Hancock	Mayor	
Jennifer Kinneman	Ward 1	
Mark Littell	Ward 1	
Vince Bucci	Ward 2	
John Sless	Ward 2	
Greg Martin	Ward 3	
Dan McCreary	Ward 3	
James Calnan	Ward 4	
Richard Carpenter	Ward 4	
John Bradford	Ward 5	
Marguerite Ceschi-Smith	Ward 5	

== 1877 city council ==
- Mayor: Dr. James W. Digby
- Alderman George Wilkes
- Alderman Thomas Large
- Alderman Daniel Costello
- Alderman Matthew A. Burns
- Alderman Edward Fisher
- Alderman George Watt
- Alderman Peter M. Keogh
- Alderman W. J. Scarfe
- Alderman George Lindley
- Alderman George Hardy
- Alderman J.J. Hawkins
- Alderman Dennis Hawkins
- Alderman Thomas Elliot
