= Brantford =

City in Ontario, Canada

- City (single-tier)
- City of Brantford
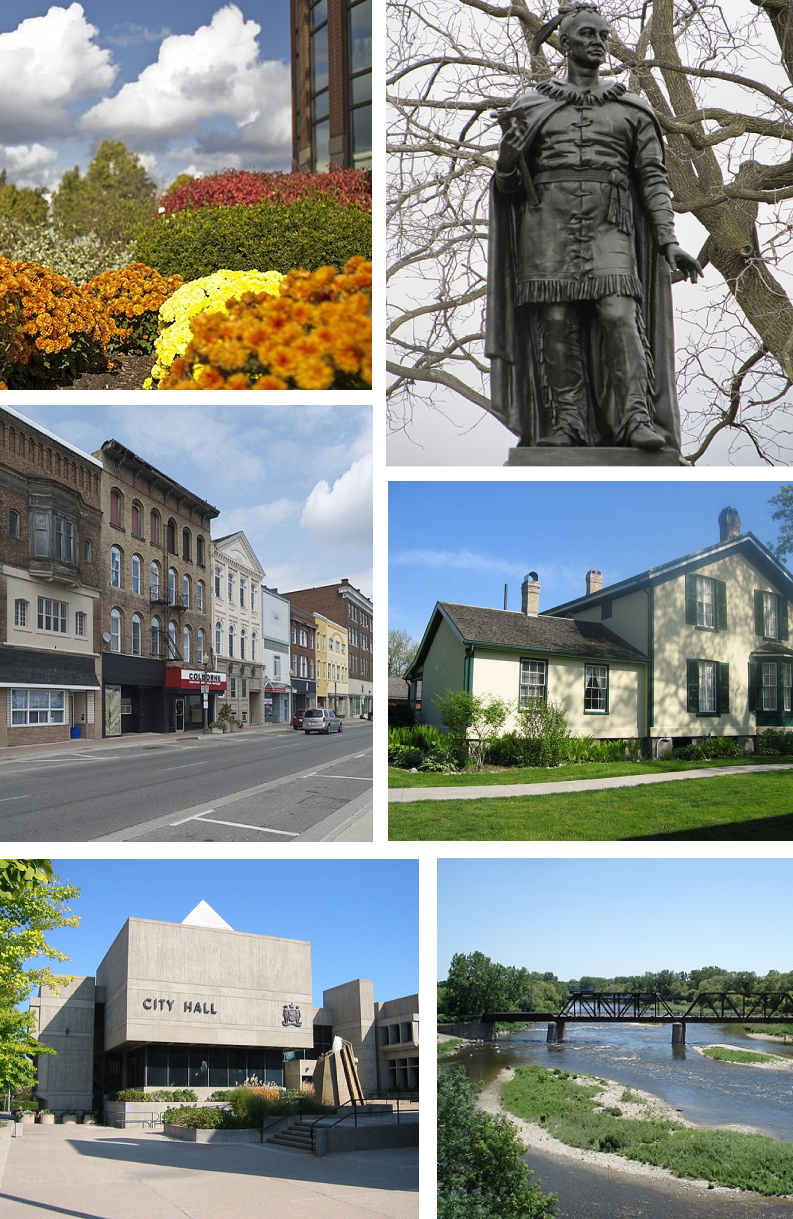
- From top, left to right: Flowerbed outside RBC Building, Statue of Joseph Brant, Colborne Street in Downtown Brantford, Bell Homestead, City Hall, Grand River

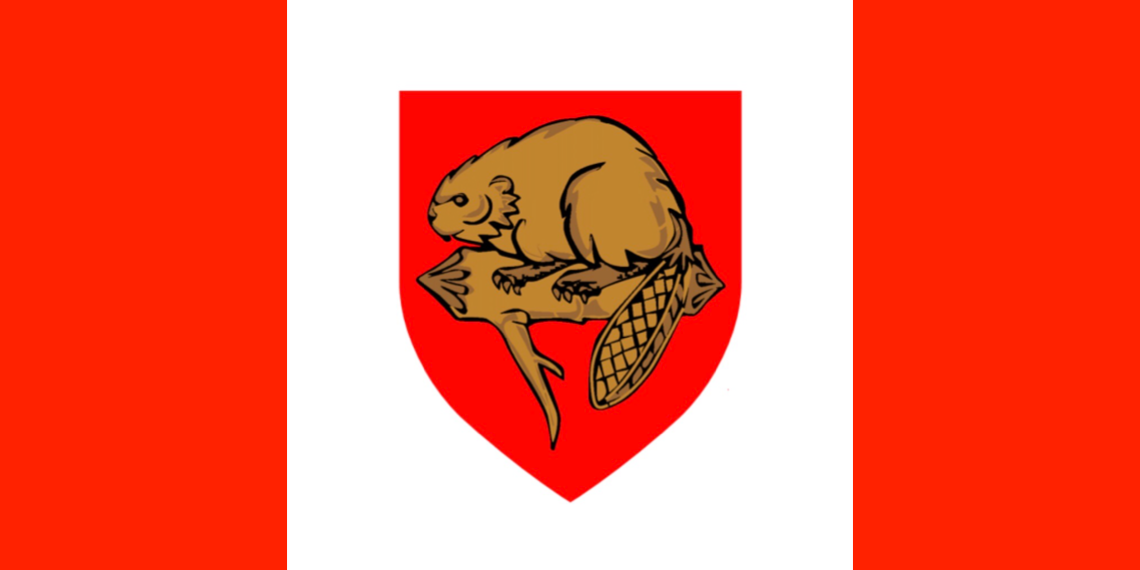
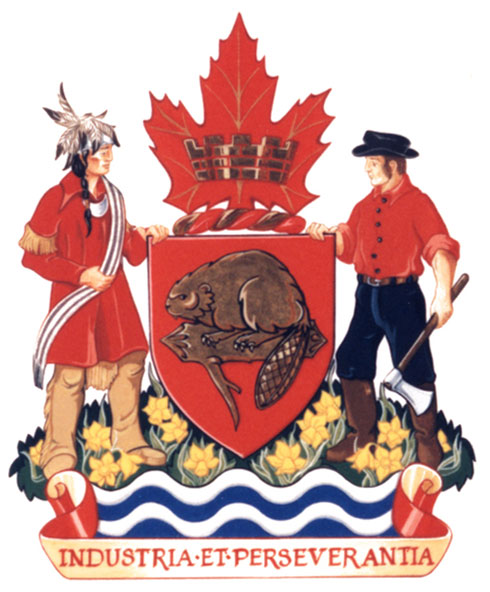
- Flag Coat of arms Logo

- Location within Southern Ontario
- Coordinates: 43°09′25″N 80°15′27″W
- Country: Canada
- Province: Ontario
- County: Brant (independent)
- Established: May 31, 1877

Government
  - Mayor: Kevin Davis
  - Governing Body: Brantford City Council
  - MP: Vacant
  - MPP: Will Bouma (Progressive Conservative)

Area
  - Land: 98.65 km^{2} (38.09 sq mi)
  - Metro: 1,074.00 km^{2} (414.67 sq mi)
- Elevation: 248 m (814 ft)

Population (2021)
  - City (single-tier): 104,688 (53rd)
  - Density: 1,061.2/km^{2} (2,748/sq mi)
  - Metro: 144,162 (30th)
  - Metro density: 134.2/km^{2} (348/sq mi)
- Demonym: Brantfordite

Gross Metropolitan Product
  - Brantford CMA: CA$6.1 billion (2020)
- Time zone: UTC−5 (EST)
  - Summer (DST): UTC−4 (EDT)
- Forward sortation area: N3P to N3V
- Area codes: 519, 226, and 548
- Website: www.brantford.ca

Brantford is a city in Ontario, Canada, founded on the Grand River in Southwestern Ontario. It is surrounded by Brant County but is politically separate with a municipal government of its own that is fully independent of the county's municipal government.

Brantford is situated on the Haldimand Tract, and is named after Joseph Brant, a Mohawk leader, soldier, farmer and slave owner. Brant was an important Loyalist leader during the American Revolutionary War and later, after the Haudenosaunee moved to the Brantford area in Upper Canada. Many of his descendants and other First Nations people live on the nearby Six Nations of the Grand River reserve south of Brantford; it is the most populous reserve in Canada.

Brantford is known as the "Telephone City" because resident Alexander Graham Bell invented the first telephone at his father's homestead, Melville House, now the Bell Homestead National Historic Site, located in Tutela Heights south of the city.

== History ==
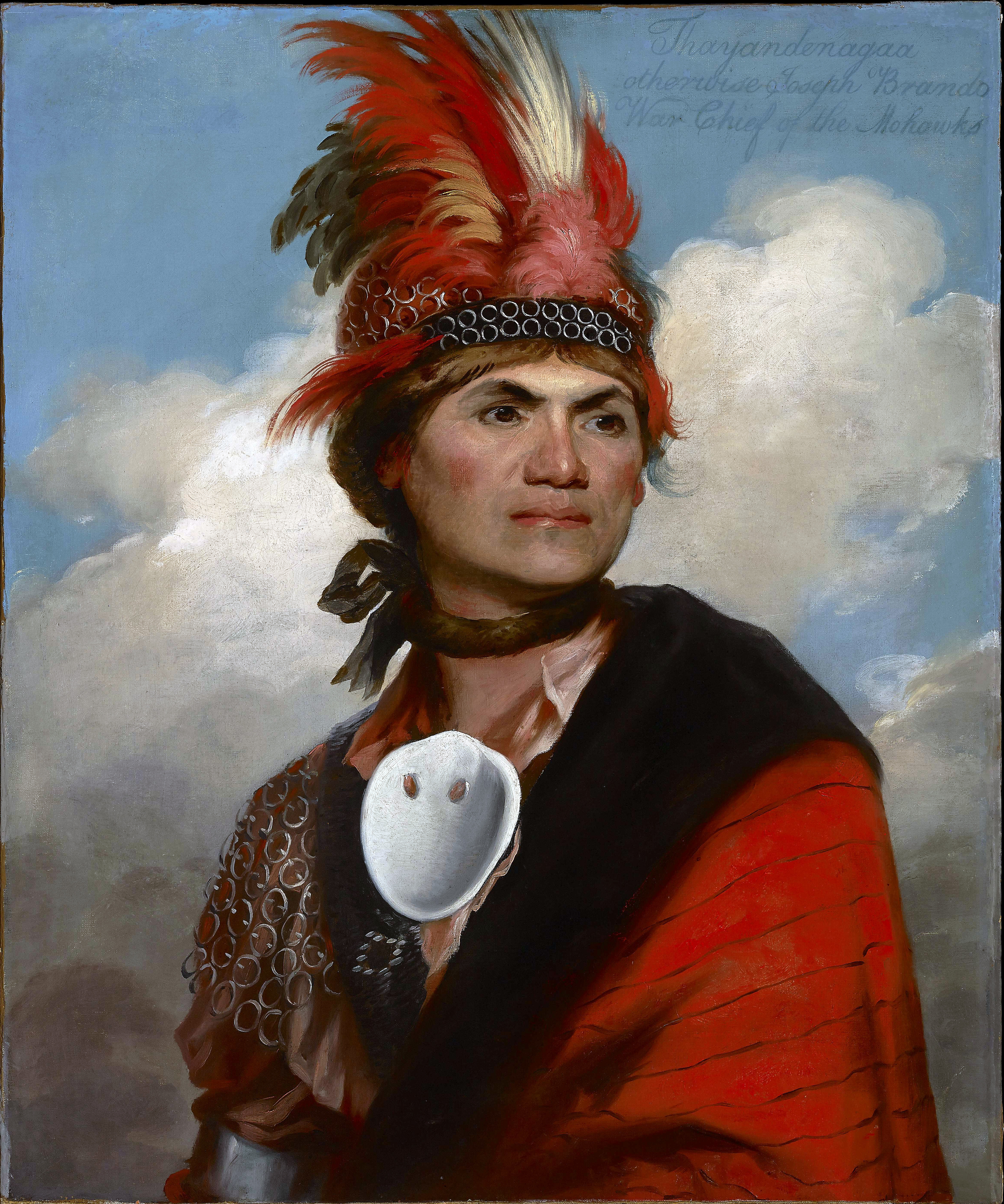
Thayendanegea or Joseph Brant, Mohawk military and political leader

The Iroquoian-speaking Attawandaron, known in English as the Neutral Nation, lived in the Grand River valley area before the 17th century; their main village and seat of the chief, Kandoucho, was identified by 19th-century historians as having been located on the Grand River where present-day Brantford developed. This community, like the rest of their settlements, was destroyed when the Haudenosaunee declared war in 1650 over the fur trade and exterminated the Neutral nation.

In 1784, Captain Joseph Brant and the Mohawk people of the Haudenosaunee Confederacy left New York State for Canada. As a reward for their loyalty to the British Crown, they were given a large land grant, referred to as the Haldimand Tract, on the Grand River. The original Mohawk settlement was on the south edge of the present-day city at a location favourable for landing canoes. Brant's crossing (or fording) of the river gave the original name to the area: Brant's ford. The Glebe Farm Indian Reserve exists at the original site today.

The area began to grow from a small settlement in the 1820s as the Hamilton and London Road was improved. By the 1830s, Brantford became a stop on the Underground Railroad, and a sizable number of runaway African-Americans settled in the town. From the 1830s to the 1860s – several hundred people of African descent settled in the area around Murray Street, and in Cainsville. In Brantford, they established their own school and church, now known as the S.R. Drake Memorial Church. In 1846, it is estimated 2,000 residents lived in the city's core while 5,199 lived in the outlying rural areas. There were eight churches in Brantford at this time – Episcopal, Presbyterian, Catholic, two Methodist, Baptist, Congregational, and one for the African-Canadian residents.

By 1847, Europeans began to settle further up the river at a ford in the Grand River and named their village Brantford. The population increased after 1848 when river navigation to Brantford was opened and again in 1854 with the arrival of the railway to Brantford.

Because of the ease of navigation from new roads and the Grand River, several manufacturing companies could be found in the town by 1869. Some of these factories included Brantford Engine Works, Victoria Foundry and Britannia Foundry. Several major farm implement manufacturers, starting with Cockshutt and Harris, opened for business in the 1870s.

The history of the Brantford region from 1793 to 1920 is described at length in the book At The Forks of The Grand.

In the late 19th and early 20th centuries, the Canadian government encouraged the education of First Nations children at residential schools, which were intended to teach them English and European-Canadian ways and assimilate them into the majority cultures. Such institutions in or near Brantford included the Thomas Indian School, Mohawk Institute Residential School (also known as Mohawk Manual Labour School and Mush Hole Indian Residential School), and the Haudenosaunee boarding school. Decades later and particularly since the late 20th century, numerous scholarly and artistic works have explored the detrimental effects of the schools in destroying Native cultures.

In June 1945, Brantford became the first city in Canada to fluoridate its water supply.

Brantford generated controversy in 2010 when its city council expropriated and demolished 41 historic downtown buildings on the south side of its main street, Colborne Street. The buildings constituted one of the longest blocks of pre-Confederation architecture in Canada and included one of Ontario's first grocery stores and an early 1890s office of the Bell Telephone Company of Canada. The decision was widely criticized by Ontario's heritage preservation community, however, the city argued it was needed for downtown renewal.

=== Historical plaques and memorials ===
Plaques and monuments erected by the provincial and federal governments provide additional glimpses into the early history of the area around Brantford.

The famed Mohawk Chief Joseph Brant (Thayendanega) led his people from the Mohawk Valley of New York State to Upper Canada after being allied with the British during the American Revolution, where they lost their land holdings. A group of 400 settled in 1788 on the Grand River at Mohawk Village which would later become Brantford. Nearly a century later (1886), the Joseph Brant Memorial would be erected in Burlington, Ontario in honour of Brant and the Six Nations Confederacy.

The Mohawk Chapel, built by the British Crown in 1785 for the Mohawk and Haudenosaunee people (Six Nations of the Grand River), was dedicated in 1788 as a reminder of the original agreements made with the British during the American Revolution. In 1904 the chapel received Royal status by King Edward VII in memory of the longstanding alliance. Her Majesty's Royal Chapel of the Mohawks is an important reminder of the original agreements made with Queen Anne in 1710. It is still in use today as one of two royal Chapels in Canada and the oldest Protestant Church in the province. Joseph Brant and his son John Brant are buried here.

Chief John Brant (Mohawk leader) (Ahyonwaeghs) was one of the sons of Joseph Brant. He fought with the British during the War of 1812 and later worked to improve the welfare of the First Nations. He was involved in building schools and improving the welfare of his people. Brant initiated the opening of schools and, from 1828, served as the first native Superintendent of the Six Nations. Chief Brant was elected to the Legislative Assembly of Upper Canada for Haldimand in 1830 and was the first aboriginal Canadian in Parliament.

The stone and brick Brant County Courthouse was built on land purchased from the Six Nations in 1852. The structure housed courtrooms, county offices, a law library and a jail. During additions in the 1880s, the Greek Revival style, with Doric columns, was retained.

Among the most famed residents were Alexander Graham Bell and his family, who arrived in mid 1870 from Scotland while Bell was suffering from tuberculosis. They lived with Bell's father and mother, who had settled in a farmhouse on Tutela Heights (named after the First Nations tribe of the area and later absorbed into Brantford.) Then called Melville House, it is now a museum, the Bell Homestead National Historic Site. This was the site of the invention of the telephone in 1874 and ongoing trials in 1876. The Bell Memorial, also known as the Bell Monument, was commissioned to commemorate Bell's invention of the telephone in Brantford; it is also one of the National Historic Sites of Canada.

=== Invention of the telephone ===
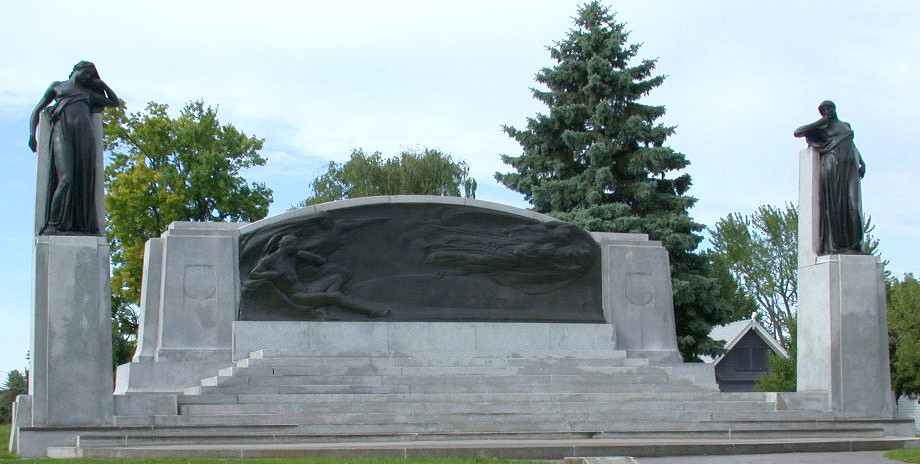
Bell Memorial, commemorating the invention of the telephone by Alexander Graham Bell

Some articles suggest that the telephone was invented in Boston, where Alexander Graham Bell did a great deal of work on the development of the device. However, Bell confirmed Brantford as the birthplace of the device in a 1906 speech: "the telephone problem was solved, and it was solved at my father's home". At the unveiling of the Bell Memorial on 24 October 1917, Bell reminded the attendees that "Brantford is right in claiming the invention of the telephone here... [which was] conceived in Brantford in 1874 and born in Boston in 1875" and that "the first transmission to a distance was made between Brantford and Paris" (on 3 August 1876). As well, the second successful voice transmission (over a distance of 6 km; 4 miles) was also made in the area, on 4 August 1876, between the telegraph office in Brantford, Ontario and Bell's father's homestead over makeshift wires.

Canada's first telephone factory, created by James Cowherd, was located in Brantford and operated from about 1879 until Cowherd's death in 1881. The first telephone business office which opened in 1877, not far from the Bell Homestead, was located in what is now Brantford. The combination of events has led to Brantford calling itself "The Telephone City".

== Law and government ==
Brantford is located within the County of Brant; however, it is a single-tier municipality, politically separate from the county. Ontario's Municipal Act, 2001 defines single-tier municipalities as "a municipality, other than an upper-tier municipality, that does not form part of an upper-tier municipality for municipal purposes." Single-tier municipalities provide for all local government services.

Brantford federal election results
Year	Liberal		Conservative		New Democratic		Green	
2021	29%	13,409	38%	17,655	21%	9,956	3%	1,226
2019	31%	14,977	38%	18,058	22%	10,280	7%	2,747

Brantford provincial election results
Year	PC		New Democratic		Liberal		Green	
2022	43%	13,926	30%	9,773	13%	4,252	7%	2,158
2018	39%	16,473	44%	18,560	10%	4,032	4%	1,860

At the federal and provincial levels of government, Brantford is part of the Brant riding.

Brantford City Council is the municipal governing body. As of October 22, 2018, the mayor is Kevin Davis.

=== Safety ===
Brantford's economy was hit hard in the 1980s when farm equipment manufacturers Massey Ferguson and White Farm Equipment closed their local plants. By the end of 1981, the city's unemployment rate reached 22%. As with other small Ontario cities hit by the decline of manufacturing, the community struggled with an increase in social problems.

In more recent times, the city was hit hard by the opioid crisis. In 2018, Brantford had the highest rate of emergency department visits for overdose of any city in Ontario. In 2018, Brantford police reported an overall crime rate of 6,533 incidents per 100,000 population, 59% higher than in Ontario (4,113) and 19% higher than in Canada (5,488). The same year, Maclean's magazine ranked Brantford as having a higher rate of crime severity than most of the province.

== Economy ==
The electric telephone was invented here leading to the establishment of Canada's first telephone factory here in the 1870s. Brantford developed as an important Canadian industrial centre for the first half of the 20th century, and it was once the third-ranked Canadian city in terms of the cash value of manufactured goods exported.

The city developed at the deepest navigable point of the Grand River. Because of existing networks, it became a railroad hub of Southern Ontario. The combination of water and rail helped Brantford develop from a farming community into an industrial city with many blue-collar jobs based on the agriculture implementation industry. Major companies included S.C. Johnson Wax, Massey-Harris, Verity Plow, and the Cockshutt Plow Company. This industry, more than any other, provided the well-paying and steady employment that allowed Brantford to sustain economic growth through most of the 20th century.

By the 1980s and 1990s, Brantford's economy was in steady decline due to changes in heavy industry and its restructuring. Numerous companies suffered bankruptcies, such as White Farm Equipment, Massey Ferguson (and its successor, Massey Combines Corporation), Koering-Waterous, Harding Carpets, and other manufacturers. The bankruptcies and closures of the businesses left thousands of people unemployed. As a consequence, it became one of the most economically depressed areas in the country, leaving a negative impact on the once-vibrant downtown.

An economic revival was prompted by the completion of the Brantford-to-Ancaster section of Highway 403 in 1997, bringing companies easy access to Hamilton and Toronto and completing a direct route from Detroit to Buffalo. In 2004 Procter & Gamble and Ferrero SpA chose to locate in the city. Though Wescast Industries, Inc. recently closed its local foundry, its corporate headquarters will remain in Brantford. SC Johnson Canada has their headquarters and a manufacturing plant in Brantford, connected to the Canadian National network. Other companies that have their headquarters here include Gunther Mele and GreenMantra Technologies. On February 16, 2005, Brant, including Brantford, was added to the Greater Golden Horseshoe along with Haldimand and Northumberland counties. In 2017, Japanese manufacturer Mitsui High-tec opened a factory to produce motor cores for electric and hybrid vehicles in Brantford.

In February 2019, Brantford's unemployment rate stood at 4.6% – lower than Ontario's rate of 5.6%.

== Climate ==
Brantford has a humid continental climate (Dfb) with Summer Day Highs around 30 °C (86 °F) and Winter nights can fall to −20 °C (−4 °F), Snow usually falls from October–April.

Climate data for Brantford (1981−2010 normals, extremes 1960–present)
Month	Jan	Feb	Mar	Apr	May	Jun	Jul	Aug	Sep	Oct	Nov	Dec	Year
Record high °C (°F)	17.0 (62.6)	16.5 (61.7)	25.5 (77.9)	30.5 (86.9)	34.0 (93.2)	35.5 (95.9)	38.5 (101.3)	36.5 (97.7)	34.4 (93.9)	30.0 (86.0)	25.0 (77.0)	20.5 (68.9)	38.5 (101.3)
Mean daily maximum °C (°F)	−1.6 (29.1)	0.3 (32.5)	5.1 (41.2)	12.4 (54.3)	19.3 (66.7)	24.6 (76.3)	27.2 (81.0)	25.8 (78.4)	21.7 (71.1)	14.5 (58.1)	7.9 (46.2)	1.4 (34.5)	13.2 (55.8)
Daily mean °C (°F)	−6.0 (21.2)	−4.3 (24.3)	0.3 (32.5)	7.0 (44.6)	13.5 (56.3)	18.7 (65.7)	21.3 (70.3)	20.2 (68.4)	16.0 (60.8)	9.3 (48.7)	3.8 (38.8)	−2.5 (27.5)	8.1 (46.6)
Mean daily minimum °C (°F)	−10.4 (13.3)	−8.9 (16.0)	−4.5 (23.9)	1.5 (34.7)	7.5 (45.5)	12.7 (54.9)	15.4 (59.7)	14.6 (58.3)	10.1 (50.2)	3.9 (39.0)	−0.3 (31.5)	−6.3 (20.7)	3.0 (37.4)
Record low °C (°F)	−33.9 (−29.0)	−34.4 (−29.9)	−30.0 (−22.0)	−16.1 (3.0)	−4.4 (24.1)	−1.7 (28.9)	3.3 (37.9)	1.1 (34.0)	−4.5 (23.9)	−11.1 (12.0)	−18.9 (−2.0)	−30.0 (−22.0)	−34.4 (−29.9)
Average precipitation mm (inches)	54.7 (2.15)	51.5 (2.03)	59.1 (2.33)	68.9 (2.71)	81.1 (3.19)	75.9 (2.99)	95.0 (3.74)	75.0 (2.95)	86.6 (3.41)	70.1 (2.76)	84.4 (3.32)	65.1 (2.56)	867.3 (34.15)
Average rainfall mm (inches)	27.6 (1.09)	30.4 (1.20)	43.5 (1.71)	65.3 (2.57)	81.1 (3.19)	75.9 (2.99)	95.0 (3.74)	75.0 (2.95)	86.6 (3.41)	70.1 (2.76)	78.3 (3.08)	40.8 (1.61)	769.6 (30.30)
Average snowfall cm (inches)	27.1 (10.7)	21.9 (8.6)	15.6 (6.1)	3.6 (1.4)	0.0 (0.0)	0.0 (0.0)	0.0 (0.0)	0.0 (0.0)	0.0 (0.0)	0.1 (0.0)	6.1 (2.4)	24.2 (9.5)	98.4 (38.7)
Average precipitation days (≥ 0.2 mm)	11.3	9.5	11.1	12.2	12.4	10.4	10.4	10.5	10.6	12.2	13.2	12.0	135.6
Average rainy days (≥ 0.2 mm)	4.5	4.7	8.1	11.6	12.4	10.4	10.4	10.5	10.6	12.2	11.8	7.0	114.0
Average snowy days (≥ 0.2 cm)	7.0	5.4	3.7	0.92	0.0	0.0	0.0	0.0	0.0	0.1	1.5	5.8	24.4
Source: Environment Canada

*Note Not All Sources Are The Same*

== Demographics ==
Historical population
Year	Pop.	±%
1841	2,000	—
1871	8,107	+305.3%
1881	9,616	+18.6%
1891	12,753	+32.6%
1901	16,619	+30.3%
1911	23,132	+39.2%
1921	29,440	+27.3%
1931	30,107	+2.3%
1941	31,622	+5.0%
1951	36,727	+16.1%
1961	55,201	+50.3%
1971	64,421	+16.7%
1981	74,315	+15.4%
1991	81,997	+10.3%
1996	84,764	+3.4%
2001	86,417	+2.0%
2006	90,192	+4.4%
2011	93,650	+3.8%
2016	98,563	+5.2%
2021	104,688	+6.2%

In the 2021 Census of Population conducted by Statistics Canada, Brantford had a population of 104,688 living in 41,673 of its 43,269 total private dwellings, a change of 6.2% from its 2016 population of 98,563. With a land area of 98.65 km^{2} (38.09 sq mi), it had a population density of 1,061.2/km^{2} (2,748.5/sq mi) in 2021.

At the census metropolitan area (CMA) level in the 2021 census, the Brantford CMA had a population of 144,162 living in 56,003 of its 58,047 total private dwellings, a change of 7.4% from its 2016 population of 134,203. With a land area of 1,074 km^{2} (415 sq mi), it had a population density of 134.2/km^{2} (347.7/sq mi) in 2021.

=== Ethnicity ===
Largest ethnic origin in Brantford CMA by census tract based on 2021 census

103,210 people gave their ethnic background on the 2021 census, up from 95,780 on the 2016 census. Brantford has the highest proportion of Indigenous people (Status Indians) in Southern Ontario, outside of an Indian reserve.

Panethnic groups in the City of Brantford (2001−2021)
Panethnic group	2021		2016		2011		2006		2001	
Panethnic group	Pop.	%	Pop.	%	Pop.	%	Pop.	%	Pop.	%
European (Note: Statistic includes all persons that did not make up part of a visible minority or an indigenous identity.)	82,015	79.46%	80,945	84.51%	81,035	88.11%	79,205	89.15%	78,115	91.77%
South Asian	6,070	5.88%	3,115	3.25%	1,640	1.78%	1,660	1.87%	1,245	1.46%
Indigenous	5,415	5.25%	5,395	5.63%	4,090	4.45%	3,440	3.87%	2,475	2.91%
African	3,570	3.46%	2,015	2.1%	1,550	1.69%	1,580	1.78%	1,110	1.3%
Southeast Asian (Note: Statistic includes total responses of "Filipino" and "Southeast Asian" under visible minority section on census.)	2,385	2.31%	1,805	1.88%	1,190	1.29%	1,195	1.35%	1,045	1.23%
East Asian (Note: Statistic includes total responses of "Chinese", "Korean", and "Japanese" under visible minority section on census.)	1,020	0.99%	1,065	1.11%	1,090	1.19%	940	1.06%	670	0.79%
Middle Eastern (Note: Statistic includes total responses of "West Asian" and "Arab" under visible minority section on census.)	910	0.88%	490	0.51%	655	0.71%	115	0.13%	140	0.16%
Latin American	905	0.88%	445	0.46%	365	0.4%	360	0.41%	140	0.16%
Other (Note: Statistic includes total responses of "Visible minority, n.i.e." and "Multiple visible minorities" under visible minority section on census.)	920	0.89%	510	0.53%	355	0.39%	245	0.28%	190	0.22%
Total responses	103,210	98.59%	95,780	98.24%	91,975	98.21%	88,845	98.51%	85,125	98.5%
Total population	104,688	100%	97,496	100%	93,650	100%	90,192	100%	86,417	100%

- Note: Totals greater than 100% due to multiple origin responses.

=== Religion ===
Largest non-Christian religion in Brantford CMA by census tract based on the 2021 census

In 2021, 51.8% of residents were Christian, down from 64.8% in 2011. 22.2% of residents were Catholic, 17.6% were Protestant, and 7.7% were Christian not otherwise specified. All other Christian denominations and Christian-related traditions accounted for 4.1% of the population. 40.4% of residents had no religion, up from 31.6% in 2011. All other religions and spiritual traditions make up 8.1% of the population. The largest non-Christian religions were Sikhism (2.6%), Islam (2.0%), Hinduism (1.7%) and Buddhism (0.5%).

== Film and television ==
Brantford has been used as a filming location for TV and films.

- The television series Murdoch Mysteries has used the Carnegie Building, now part of Wilfrid Laurier University's Brantford campus, as the courthouse. The interior of the Sanderson Centre for the Performing Arts has also been featured in the series. In addition, Victoria Park and many of the older homes along Dalhousie and George streets have been used for shot locations.
- The television series The Boys third season was partially filmed in Brantford during the spring of 2021.
- The television series The Handmaid's Tale had several locations filmed in Brantford during 2018, 2020 and 2022.
- Several movies have had scenes shot at the Brantford Airport, including Welcome to Mooseport and Where the Truth Lies. Many Mayday episodes have also been filmed there.
- An episode of Due South, "Dr. Long Ball", was filmed at Arnold Anderson Stadium in Cockshutt Park.
- Brantford's downtown provided locations for Weirdsville and Silent Hill (both 2006). Many area residents observed that little work had to be done to make downtown look decayed and haunted.
- Brantford's Sanderson Centre for the Performing Arts was used as "The Rose" mainstage theatre of the "New Burbage Festival" in the series Slings & Arrows.

== Education ==
Statistics from the Federal 2021 Census indicated that 57.2% of Brantford's adult residents (ages 25 to 64) had earned either a post-secondary certificate, diploma, or university degree, compared to 67.8% for the whole of Ontario.

=== Universities and colleges ===
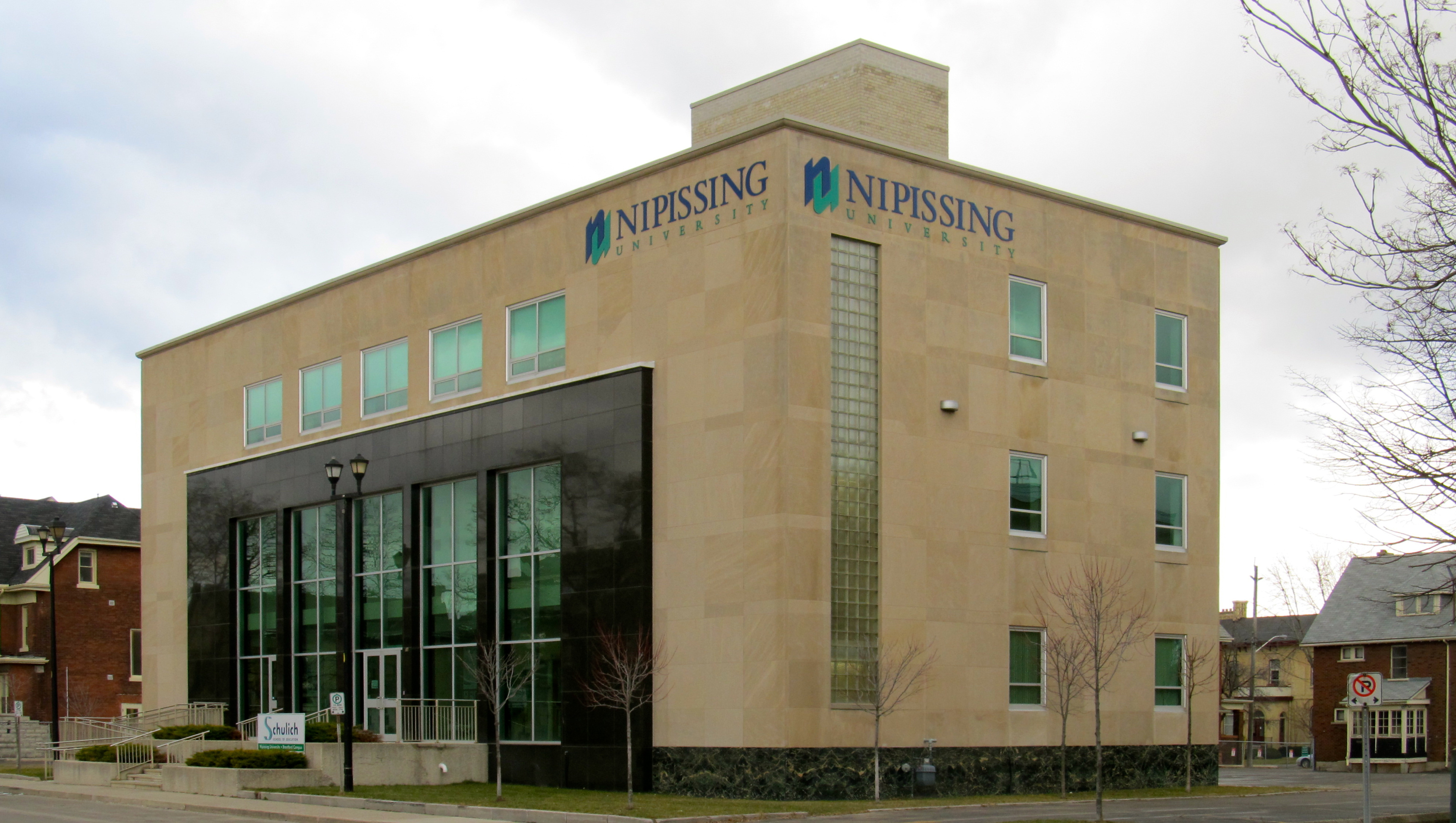
Brantford campus of Nipissing University

Several post-secondary institutions have facilities in Brantford.

- Laurier Brantford, a campus of Wilfrid Laurier University, offers a variety of programs at their downtown campus. The 2013–14 enrollment is 2,800 full-time students.
  - The Faculty of Liberal Arts includes Contemporary Studies, Journalism, History, English, Youth and Children's Studies, Human Rights and Human Diversity, Languages at Brantford and Law and Society programs. The Faculty of Human and Social Sciences includes Criminology, Health Studies, Psychology and Leadership.
  - The Faculty of Social Work includes the Bachelor of Social Work.
  - The Faculty of Graduate and Post-Doctoral Studies includes Social Justice and Community Engagement (MA) and Criminology (MA)
  - The School of Business and Economics includes Business Technology Management.
- Six Nations Polytechnic operates out of the former Mohawk College campus. The school offers various 2-year college programs from their campus in Brantford. They also have a campus on the nearby Six Nations of the Grand River, catering to mostly university programs.
- Nipissing University, in partnership with Laurier Brantford, offers the Concurrent Education program in Brantford. In five years, students earn an Honours Bachelor of Arts in Society, Culture & Environment from Laurier Brantford and a Bachelor of Education from Nipissing University. During the 2013–14 academic year there were 70 full-time and 100 part-time students in the program.
- Conestoga College offers academic programming in Brantford's downtown core in partnership with Wilfrid Laurier University and its Laurier Brantford campus. Conestoga College offers diplomas in Business and Health Office Administration, a graduate certificate in Human Resources Management, and a certificate in Medical Office Practice in Brantford. This program has 120 full-time students in the 2013–14 academic year.
- Mohawk College had a satellite campus; however, the college ceased operations in Brantford and transferred the property to Six Nations Polytechnic at the end of the 2013–14 academic year.

=== Secondary schools ===
Public education in the area is managed by the Grand Erie District School Board, and Catholic education is managed by the Brant Haldimand Norfolk Catholic District School Board.

- Assumption College School (Catholic)
- Brantford Collegiate Institute – successor to Brantford Grammar School (c. 1852) and Brantford High School (c. 1871).
- North Park Collegiate & Vocational School
- Pauline Johnson Collegiate & Vocational School
- St. John's College (Catholic)
- Tollgate Technological Skills Centre (formerly known as Herman E. Fawcett)
- Grand Erie Learning Alternatives (GELA)

=== Elementary schools ===
Public education in the area is managed by the Grand Erie District School Board, and Catholic education is managed by the Brant Haldimand Norfolk Catholic District School Board and the Conseil Scolaire de District Catholique Centre-Sud.

=== Other ===
- The W. Ross Macdonald School for blind and deafblind students is located in Brantford.
- The Mohawk Institute Residential School, a Canadian Indian residential school, was located in Brantford. It was closed after emphasis on educating children in their home communities and encouraging their own cultures, in part because of reporting of abuses at such facilities.
- Braemar House School is a private elementary school.

== Media ==
=== Online ===
BTOWN is a free alternative online magazine which highlights people, projects and events in the Brantford area.

=== Print ===
The Brantford Expositor, started in 1852, is published by Sun Media Corp. six days a week (excluding Sundays).

The Brant News was a weekly paper, delivered Thursdays until 2018; it publishes breaking news online at their website, and is published by Metroland Media Group.

The Two Row Times, a Free weekly paper started in 2013, is published on Wednesdays, delivered to every reservation in Ontario and globally online at their website, published by Garlow Media.

BScene, a Free community paper founded in 2014, is published monthly and distributed locally throughout Brantford and Brant County via local businesses and community centers, It can also be viewed online at their website. Independently published.

=== Radio ===
- AM 1380 – CKPC (AM), religious
- FM 92.1 – CKPC-FM, adult contemporary
- FM 93.9 – CFWC-FM, country music

=== Television ===
Brantford's only local television service comes from Rogers TV (cable 20), a local community channel on Rogers Cable. Otherwise, Brantford is served by stations from Toronto, Hamilton and Kitchener.

== Infrastructure ==
=== Transportation ===
==== Air ====
Brantford Municipal Airport is located west of the city. It hosts an annual air show featuring the Snowbirds. The John C. Munro Hamilton International Airport in Hamilton is located about 35 km (20 miles) east of Brantford. Toronto Pearson International Airport is located in Mississauga, about 100 km (60 miles) northeast of Brantford.

==== Rail ====
Brantford station is located just north of downtown Brantford. Via Rail has daily passenger trains on the Quebec City-Windsor Corridor. Trains also stop at Union Station in Toronto.

Street rail began in Brantford in 1886 with horse-drawn carriages; by 1893, this system had been converted to electric. The City of Brantford took over these operations in 1914. Around 1936, it began to replace the electric street car system with gas-run buses, and by the end of 1939, the changeover was complete.

==== Bus ====
- Brantford Transit serves the city with nine regular routes operating on a half-hour schedule from the downtown Transit Terminal on Darling Street, with additional school service.
- GO bus service between downtown Brantford and Aldershot GO Station in Burlington, stopping at McMaster University.
- An on-demand service, Brant eRide, provides service to Paris, St. George, and Burford.

==== Provincial highways ====
- Highway 403, East to Hamilton, West to Woodstock.
- Highway 24, North to Cambridge, South to Simcoe.

==== Cycling ====
As of 2022, there are at least 18 km (11 mi) of bikeways in Brantford. There are some planned street redesigns which include protected bike lanes and multi-use trails, which as of 2022 are in the public consultation phase.

Some former rail lines serving Brantford have been converted to rail trails, which allow for intercommunity cycling connections to the north, south, and east. This includes the SC Johnson Trail to Paris (with further connections north to Cambridge and beyond) and the Hamilton to Brantford Rail Trail, which provides a connection east to Hamilton through Dundas and Jerseyville. Twin rail trails, the LE&N Trail and TH&B Trail, connect south to Mount Pleasant, where they connect further south ultimately to Port Dover.

=== Health care ===
Brantford General Hospital is located here.

== Culture and entertainment ==
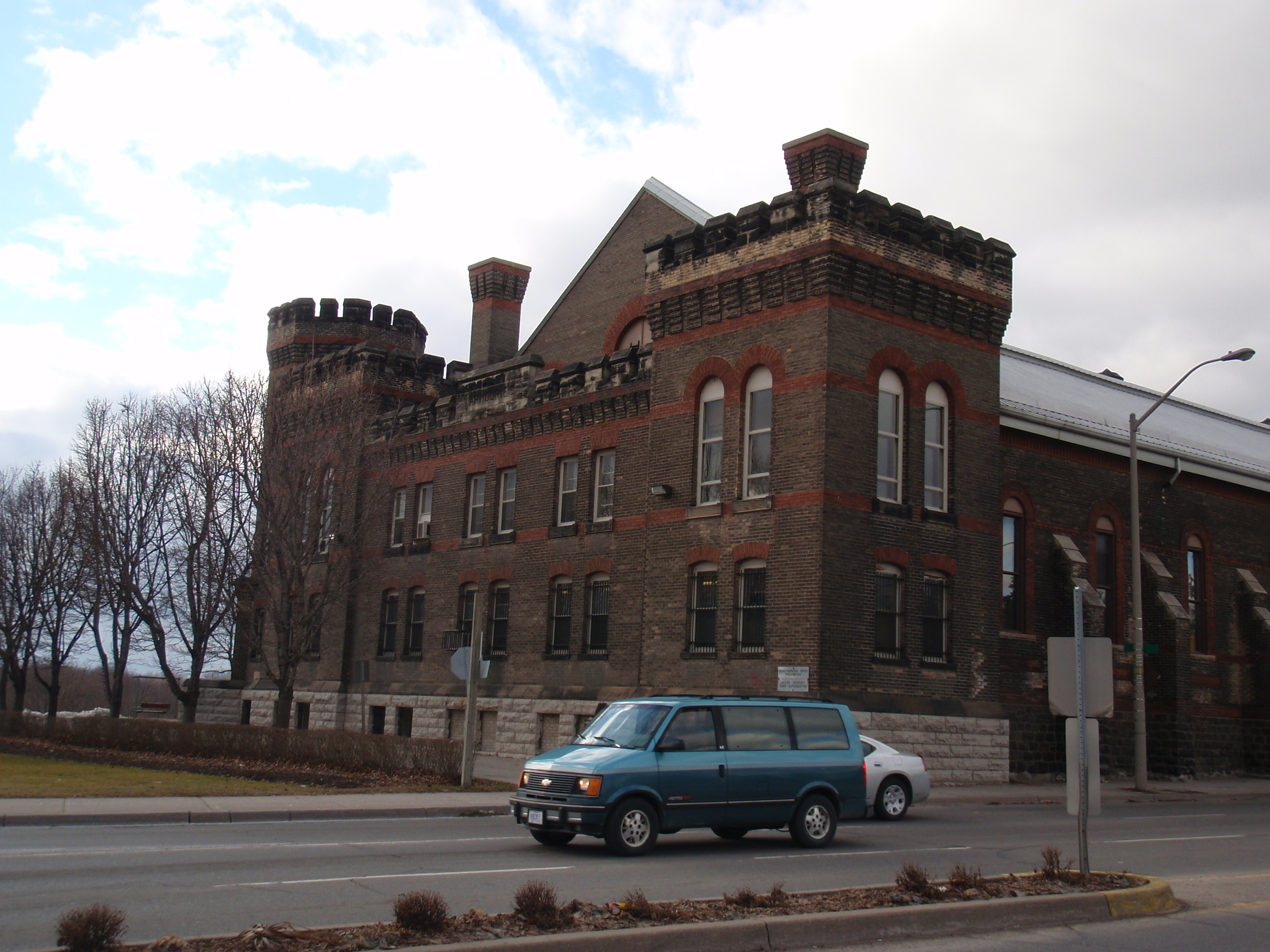
The Armoury

Local museums include the Bell Homestead, Woodland Cultural Centre, Brant Museum and Archives, Canadian Military Heritage Museum and the Personal Computer Museum.

Annual events include the "Brantford International Villages Festival" in July; the "Brantford Kinsmen Annual Ribfest" in August; the "Chili Willy Cook-Off" in February; the "Frosty Fest", a Church festival held in winter;

The Bell Summer Theatre Festival, takes place from Canada Day to Labour Day at the Bell Homestead

Brantford is the home of several theatre groups.

Brantford has a casino, Elements Casino Brantford. The Sanderson Centre for the Performing Arts is a local performance venue.

== Sports, teams and tournaments ==
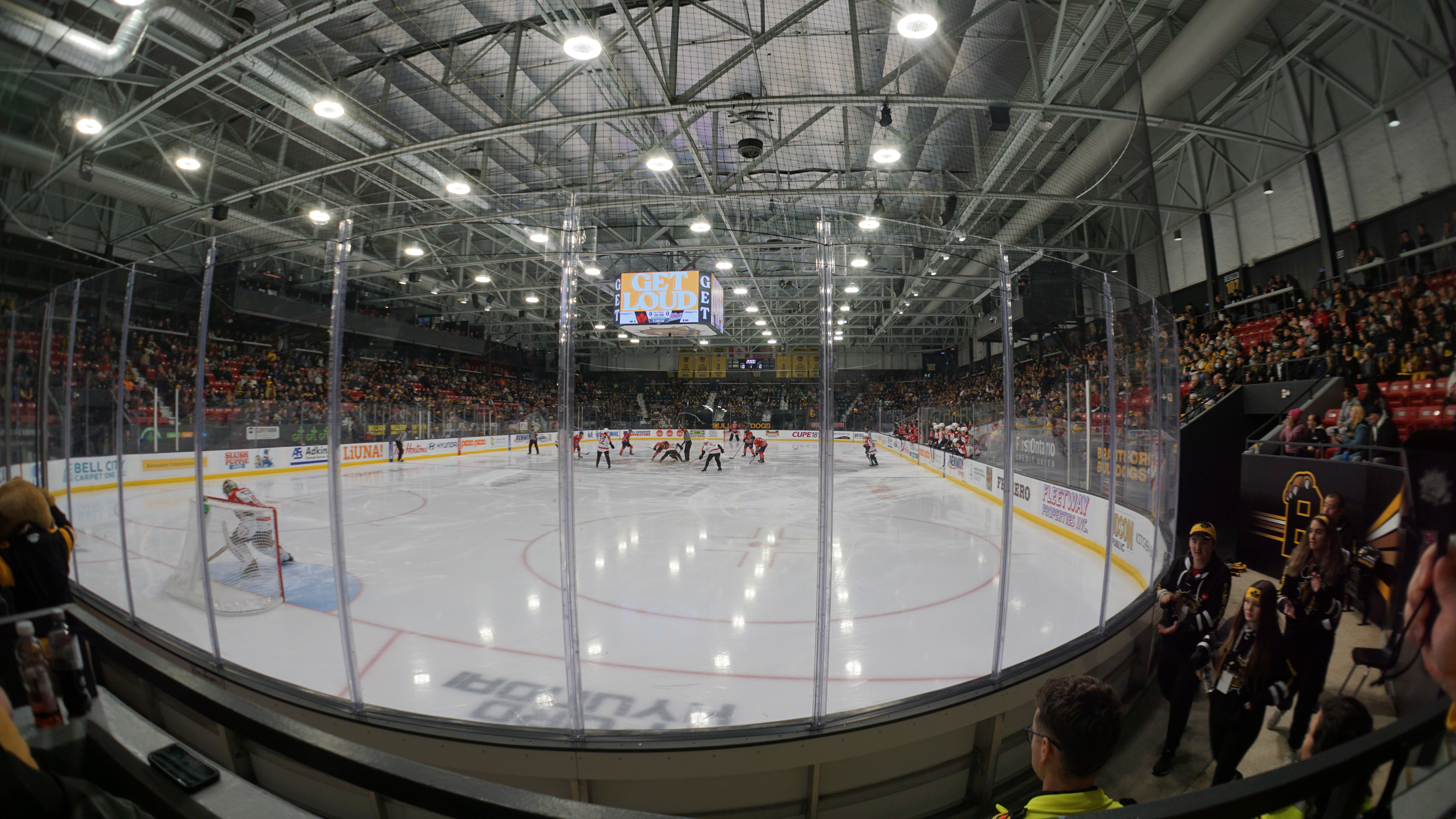
The Brantford Bulldogs playing the Oshawa Generals on November 22, 2024. The Bulldogs wore jerseys that paid homage to the Brantford Alexanders

The YMCA in Brantford organized individual and team sports, led by J. Howard Crocker from 1908 to 1911. This included intercity basketball competitions, a junior ice hockey league, and a junior baseball league. There was also an annual racewalking event sponsored by the Brantford Expositor, and the Brantford-to-Hamilton marathon race. In 1910, Brantford hosted the YMCA national athletics championships.

Tennis and pickleball courts are located at the Dufferin Tennis and Lawn Bowling Club.

=== Current intercounty or major teams ===
- Brantford Red Sox of the Canadian Baseball League who play at Arnold Anderson Stadium.
- Brantford Jr. Red Sox of the Junior Intercounty Baseball League who also play at Arnold Anderson Stadium.
- Brantford Bulldogs of the Ontario Hockey League who also play at the TD Civic Centre.
- Brantford Titans of the Greater Ontario Hockey League who play at the Wayne Gretzky Sports Centre.
- Brantford Harlequins of the Ontario Rugby Union.

=== Defunct teams ===
- Brantford Alexanders (1976 to 1978), a former team of the Senior Ontario Hockey Association who played at the Brantford Civic Centre. Won 1978 Allan Cup.
- Brantford Motts Clamatos. Won 1987 Allan Cup.
- Brantford Golden Eagles of the Greater Ontario Junior Hockey League, moved in 2012 to become Caledonia Corvairs.
- Brantford Alexanders (1978 to 1984), a former team of the Ontario Hockey League who played at the Brantford Civic Centre. They are now the Erie Otters.
- Brantford Smoke (1991–1998) of the CoHL, Colonial Hockey League who played at the Brantford Civic Centre. The team moved to Asheville in 1998.
- Brantford Blaze of the Canadian National Basketball League played only a few exhibition games in 2003–04.
- Brantford Blast of the Allan Cup Hockey League who played at the Brantford Civic Centre.
- Brantford 99ers of the Ontario Junior Hockey League who played at the Wayne Gretzky Sports Centre.
- Brantford Galaxy SC of the Canadian Soccer League who played at Lion's Park.

=== Events ===
- The Wayne Gretzky International Hockey Tournament, is held in Brantford annually.
- Brantford hosted and won the 2008 Allan Cup, which celebrated the 100th anniversary of the event.
- The city served as the pre-season camp and facility for the Pittsburgh Penguins during the late 1960s, hosting the franchise's first preseason training camp and its first preseason exhibition game.
- The Walter Gretzky Street Hockey Tournament, which celebrated its 10th anniversary in 2016, is held in Brantford annually. In 2010, the tournament was recognized and established a Guinness World Record for the largest Street Hockey Tournament in the world, with 205 teams and just over 2,096 participants.

== Twin towns – sister cities ==
Brantford is twinned with:

- Ostrów Wielkopolski, Poland
- Kamianets-Podilskyi, Ukraine

== See also ==
- Alexander Graham Bell
- Brant (electoral district)
- Brantford City Council
- List of mayors of Brantford, Ontario
