= YFD =

YFD may refer to:

- Brantford Airport, Ontario, Canada, IATA airport code YFD
- Yard Floating Dock, a type of auxiliary floating drydock
