= Six Nations =

Six Nations may refer to:

== Organizations ==
=== Political organizations ===
- Haudenosaunee Confederacy, an confederacy of Indigenous nations in North America
- Celtic League, an alliance of six Celtic nations

=== Schools ===
- Six Nations Polytechnic, a third-level college in the reserve

== Places ==
- Six Nations of the Grand River, First Nations reserve in Canada

== Sports ==
- Six Nations Championship, an annual European men's rugby union competition
  - Six Nations Under 20s Championship, under-20 men's equivalent
  - Women's Six Nations Championship, women's equivalent
- Six Nations Tournament (ice hockey), a 1994–1996 European men's ice hockey competition
- ICC Six Nations Challenge, a 2000–2004 men's cricket tournament

== See also ==
- Six-party talks, worldwide discussions aimed at resolving security concerns related to North Korea’s nuclear weapons program
- Six Nations land cessions, by the Haudenosaunee Confederacy in the 17th and 18th centuries to British North America
- Nations Cup (netball), an annual tournament held in Singapore
