= CNBL =

CNBL may refer to:

- Canadian National Basketball League
- China National Baseball League
- Christlich-Nationale Bauern- und Landvolkpartei, former German political party
- In genealogical records it is sometimes used for "cannot be learned"
