= Neutral language =

Neutral language may refer to:

- The Neutral Huron language
- Gender-neutral language
