= Kandoucho =

Village of the Neutral Nation

Kandoucho, was one of 28 villages of the Neutral Nation, or Attawandaron, in Southern Ontario in the 17th century and the home base for one of their chiefs, Tsohahissen or Souharissen. It was known to the Jesuit missionaries of Sainte-Marie among the Hurons as the village of All Saints.

The exact location of the village is debated; F. Douglas Reville's "The History of the County of Brant", published in 1920, reports that historians of his era located Kandoucho near the present-day city of Brantford, Ontario, and although verified by Sanson's map of 1656, modern archaeological scholarship rejects the accuracy of this document. The village's existence is recorded in the journals of Catholic missionaries who visited the region in the early 17th century: Reverend Father Joseph de La Roche Daillon, for example, spent the winter of 1625–1626 with the people, and his accounts were later translated into English by Dean Harris for his book "Pioneers of the Cross in Canada". Fathers Jean de Brebeuf and Pierre-Joseph-Marie Chaumonot came to the village preaching Christianity in summer 1640.

At about 1650, the Haudenosaunee declared war on the Attawandaron; by 1653, the people were practically annihilated, and their villages were wiped out, including Kandoucho.
