= Gunther Mele =

Gunther Mele Ltd. is a Canadian manufacturer and supplier of retail packaging. The company's headquarters are located in Brantford, Ontario. Gunther Mele is privately owned and has operations in the United States, China and Canada.

== History ==
Gunther Mele was established in 1857 by two German immigrant brothers and was originally named the E&A Gunther Company. The company’s mission statement was "Everything for the Jeweler except Jewelry". They supplied jewelry packaging, watch materials, and workshop tools to independent jewelers, jewelry chain stores, and large department store jewelry departments.

In 1962, a great-grandson of the founders was killed in an automobile accident after leaving a trade show. His widow sold the company to Mele Manufacturing Company of Utica, New York. In 1987, Douglas M. King, who is the current owner and CEO, purchased Gunther Mele from Mele Manufacturing. Mele Manufacturing was a major jewelry case manufacturer which owned Farrington Packaging, which itself made cases for Cross Pen, Schick Shavers and many consumer product companies. His son, Darrell King, joined the company in 1995 and now serves as the company's president.

== Overview ==
Over the years, the company has evolved into one of the largest suppliers of packaging and packaging-related products in North America. The company employs over 250 people in two facilities including a 108,000-square-foot (10,000 m^{2}) manufacturing plant in Brantford, Ontario, Canada, and an 65,000-square-foot (6,000 m^{2}) operation in Buffalo, New York, United States.

The company manufactures cotton-filled paper boxes as well as poly bags, paper bags, reusable bags, and a variety of printed ribbon, seals and packaging accessories. Gunther Mele has been an early adopter of environmentally friendly packaging, licensing TDPA oxo-biodegradable technology from epi-global and utilizing FSC approved suppliers of papers for it shopping bags. Reusable non-woven fabric style bags have become a major category for Gunther Mele.

In addition to manufacturing capabilities, the company has more than thirty years experience working with manufacturers in Asia and established a "working venture" with several overseas manufacturers. Product volume with these three manufacturing companies in China is substantial and allows the company to control production schedules, quality and delivery. Gunther Mele also owns a Chinese company called KDI Limited, located in Hong Kong, which acts as a sourcing agent, liaises with factories in quality, delivery and production methods and facilitates the company's importing activities.
