= Arnold Anderson Stadium =

Baseball venue in Brantford, Ontario, Canada

Coordinates: 43.1359°N 80.2775°W

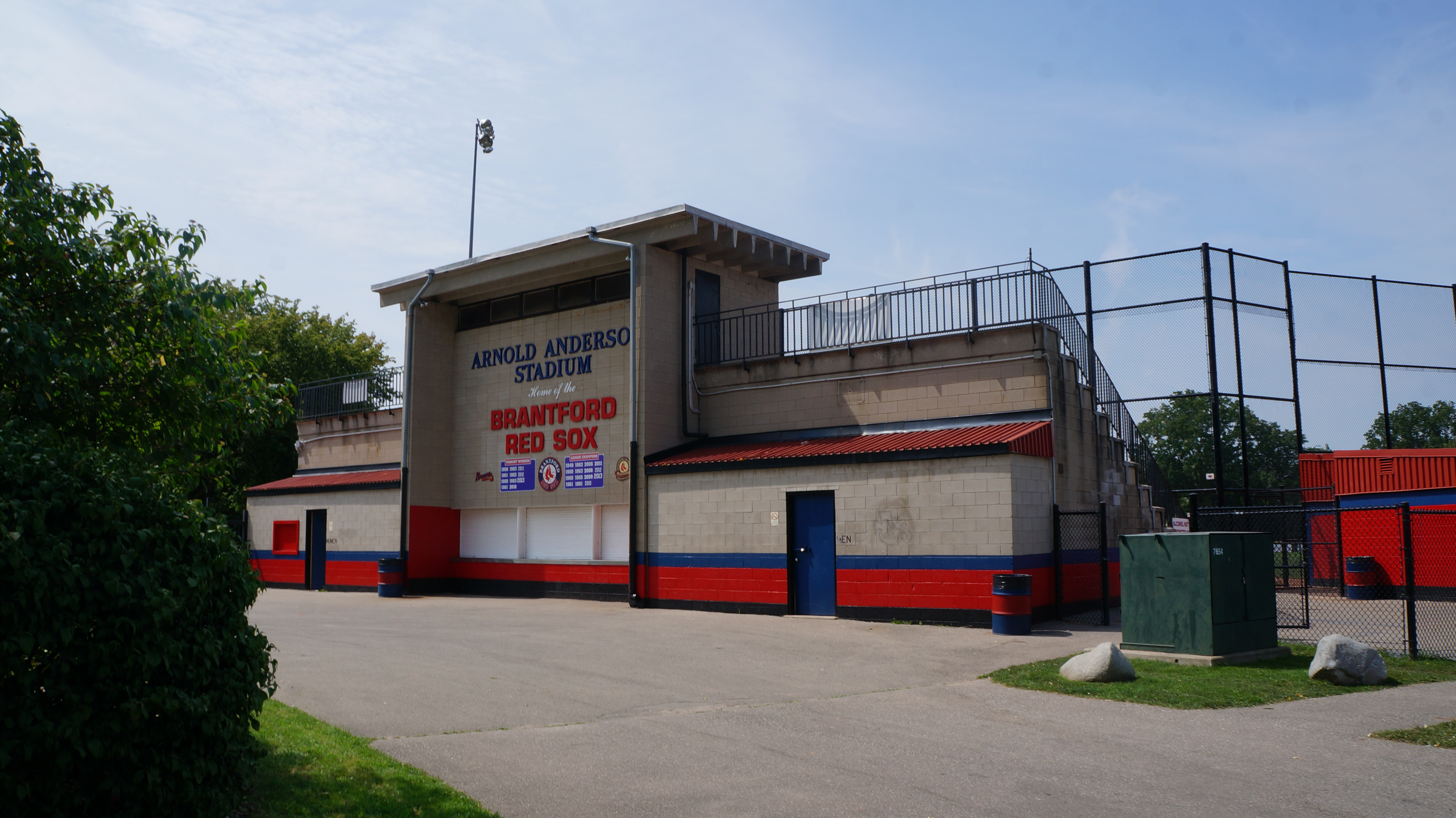
- Interactive map of Arnold Anderson Stadium
- Former names: Cockshutt Park
- Location: Brantford, Ontario, Canada
- Owner: The City of Brantford
- Capacity: 2,000
- Surface: Grass

Tenants
- Brantford Red Sox, Brantford Jr. Red Sox

Arnold Anderson Stadium at Cockshutt Park is a baseball venue located in Brantford, Ontario and home to the Brantford Red Sox of the Canadian Baseball League and the Brantford Jr. Red Sox of the Junior Intercounty Baseball League. Cockshutt Park is named after the former Lieutenant Governor of Ontario Henry Cockshutt, while Arnold Anderson Stadium was named for local broadcaster Arnold Anderson in 1998.

An episode of Due South, "Dr. Long Ball", was filmed at the stadium.
