= Wenro language =

Extinct Iroquoian language

Wenro
- Region: New York, Pennsylvania
- Ethnicity: Wenrohronon
- Extinct: 17th century
- Language family: Iroquoian: Northern; Wenro

Language codes
- ISO 639-3: None (mis)
- Glottolog: wenr1236
- Wenro territory around 1630

The Wenro language is an extinct Northern Iroquoian language formerly spoken by the Wenrohronon that was mutually intelligible with the Wendat language, spoken by the Wendat.

== Etymology ==
Wenrohronon may be derived from the name of a village, Ouaroronon, recorded by Recollet missionary Joseph de La Roche Daillon as located a day's journey from the Iroquois, although the name is likely to have been the ethnonym of people from the village (cf. Huron 8enro‛ronon).
