= Iroquoian languages =

Native American language family

Iroquoian
- Ogwehoweh
- Geographic distribution: Eastern North America
- Ethnicity: Iroquoian peoples
- Linguistic classification: One of the world's primary language families
- Proto-language: Proto-Iroquoian
- Subdivisions: Cherokee; Northern Iroquoian

Language codes
- ISO 639-2 / 5: iro
- Glottolog: iroq1247
- Labeled map showing pre-contact distribution of the Iroquoian languages

The Iroquoian languages (/ɪrəˈkwɔɪən/, irr-ə-KWOY-ən), occasionally referred to as the Ogwehoweh languages, are a family of indigenous languages of North America. They are known for their general lack of labial consonants. The Iroquoian languages are polysynthetic and head-marking.

As of 2020, almost all surviving Iroquoian languages are severely or critically endangered, with some languages having only a few elderly speakers remaining. The two languages with the most speakers, Mohawk (Kanienʼkéha) in New York and Canada, and Cherokee in Oklahoma and North Carolina, are spoken by fewer than 10% of the populations of their nations.

== Family division ==
- Iroquoian
  - Northern Iroquoian
    - (Lake Iroquoian)
      - Iroquois Proper (Five Nations)
        - Seneca (severely endangered)
        - Cayuga (severely endangered)
        - Onondaga (severely endangered)
        - Susquehannock or Conestoga †
        - Mohawk–Oneida
          - Oneida (severely endangered)
          - Mohawk (definitely endangered)
      - Huronian
        - Wendat (Huron) †
        - Petun (Tobacco) †
        - Wyandot †
    - Tuscarora–Nottoway
      - Tuscarora †
      - Meherrin †
      - Nottoway †
    - Unclassified
      - Wenrohronon or Wenro †
      - Neutral †
      - Erie †
      - Laurentian †
      - Scahentoarrhonon †
  - Southern Iroquoian/Cherokee
    - South Carolina-Georgia dialect (a.k.a. Lower dialect) †
    - North Carolina dialect (a.k.a. Middle or Kituwah dialect) (severely endangered)
    - Oklahoma dialect (a.k.a. Overhill or Western dialect) (definitely endangered)

† — language extinct/dormant

Evidence is emerging that what has been called the Laurentian language appears to be more than one dialect or language. Ethnographic and linguistic field work with Wyandot tribal elders (Barbeau 1960) yielded enough documentation for scholars to characterize and classify the Wyandot and Petun languages.

The languages of the tribes that constituted the tiny Wenrohronon, (Note: Historical examination of the Jesuits records suggest that, following the Seneca conquest of Oil Spring in 1638, the Wenro may have had no more than three villages sandwiched between Buffalo and Rochester (i.e., between the Niagara and Genesee rivers).) the powerful Conestoga Confederacy (Susquehannock) and the confederations of the Neutral Nation and the Erie Nation are very poorly documented in print. The Wyandot referred to the Neutral people as Atiwandaronk, meaning 'they who understand the language'. The Wenro and Neutral are historically grouped together, and geographically the Wenro's range on the eastern end of Lake Erie placed them between the larger confederations. To the east of the Wenro, beyond the [Genesee Gorge, were the lands of the Haudenosaunee Confederacy. To the southeast, beyond the headwaters of the Allegheny River, lay the Conestoga (Susquehannock). The Conestoga Confederacy and Erie were militarily powerful and respected by neighboring tribes. By 1660 all of these peoples but the Conestoga Confederacy and the Haudenosaunee Confederacy were defeated and scattered, migrating to form new tribes or adopted into others. The Iroquoian peoples had a practice of adopting valiant enemies into the tribe; they also adopted captive women and children to replace members who had died.

The group known as the Meherrin were neighbors to the Tuscarora and the Nottoway (Binford 1967) in the American South. They are believed to have spoken an Iroquoian language but documentation is lacking.

== External relationships ==
Attempts to link the Iroquoian, Siouan, and Caddoan languages in a Macro-Siouan family are suggestive but remain unproven (Mithun 1999:305).

== Phonology ==
- Languages of the Iroquoian family generally have relatively small consonant inventories and vowel inventories of average size.
- Notably, almost all members lack labial consonants (e.g. /m p b f v/); where labials occur they are largely restricted to borrowings, expressive vocabulary, idiolects, or allophonic realizations.
  - Cherokee /m/ in native vocabulary is restricted to ᎠᎹ /àmá, áːmá/ 'water, salt' and terms derived from them; the former developed from Proto-Iroquoian /*awẽʔ/ and the latter has no known etymology.
- No members contrast voicing, but it is widely observed allophonically and reflected in some orthographies.
- Most members have oral vowels with no nasal counterparts and nasal vowels with no oral counterparts, i.e. vowel nasalization is not contrastive.
- Cherokee has lexical tone with multiple pitch patterns, unlike its relatives; many of them can be considered to have pitch-accent instead, though the usefulness of this distinction is debated.

== Linguistics and language revitalization ==
In recent years, efforts to preserve and revitalize Iroquoian languages have grown.

As of 2012, a program in Iroquois linguistics at Syracuse University, the Certificate in Iroquois Linguistics for Language Learners, is designed for students and language teachers working in language revitalization.

Six Nations Polytechnic in Ohsweken, Ontario offers Ogwehoweh language Diploma and Degree Programs in Mohawk or Cayuga.

In 2018, the Bibliothèque et Archives nationales du Québec (BAnQ) in Canada digitized Indigenous-language books including those from Iroquoian languages such as Mohawk and "Iroquois".

Mohawk

Starting in September 2017, the University of Waterloo in Waterloo, Ontario started offering a credit course in Mohawk; the classes are to be given at Renison University College in collaboration with the Waterloo Aboriginal Education Centre, St. Paul's University College.

The St. Regis Mohawk Reservation currently supports two immersion schools, including the Akwesasne Freedom School. Here, students in grades kindergarten through ninth grade are taught fully in the Mohawk Language.

Cherokee

In 2019, the Durbin Feeling Language Preservation Act was passed, aiding in the preservation and revitalization of native languages. In 2024, Princial Chief Chuck Hoskin Jr., the Chief of the Cherokee Nation, announced the permanent reauthorization of the act. This solidified an 18 million dollar minimum operating budget to provide for language programs, protections for land to become a language campus, and a required “State of the Cherokee Language” report done each year.

The act also helped create the Durbin Feeling Language Center, a 20 million dollar facility in the Cherokee Nation capital Tahlequah that is home to all of the Cherokee's ongoing language programs. One of these programs is the Tahlequah Cherokee Immersion Charter School, serving students from pre-school through eighth grade with little to no English instruction for the school's lower grades.

Oneida

The Oneida Language and Cultural website allows users to begin learning the Oneida language online at their own pace.

Researchers at the University of Toronto are in the process of completing a digital Oneida verb conjugator with the Twatati Adult Oneida Language program.

Wendat

The Wendat language went dormant when the last fluent speaker died around 150 years ago. Efforts to revitalize the language began gaining popularity in the 1970s, but the creation of the Yawenda Project in 2007 began more sustained efforts to revive the Wendat language. The Yawenda Project was run from 2007 to 2013, and most notably produced a Wendat tribal linguist, Megan Lukaniec.

Now, the Wendat language is actively being revitalized through the work of community members. Arakwa Siouï creates online worksheets for language learning, and shares the language activities she creates on the Facebook page 'Tsiweyih iyawendou'tenh.' Andrée Levesque-Sioui does shows, music lessons, and teaches young children in Wendat, and Marcel Godbout is the cultural officer and teacher at the Centre de développement de la formation et de la main-d’œuvre Huron-Wendat (Huron-Wendat training and workforce development centre).

Marguerite Vincent Tehariolina was a prominent figure of language revitalization for the Wendat community. She published a book titled La Nation Huronne: Son Histoire, Sa Culture, Son Esprit (The Huronne Nation: Its History, Culture, and Spirit), a throughly-researched work chronicling the Wendat's extensive history.

== See also ==
- Proto-Iroquoian language
- Dean R. Snow and William A. Starna – archeologists and historians who have conducted ground-breaking archeological research in the Mohawk Valley and other Iroquoian sites
