= Rebecca Jamieson =

Canadian Tuscarora educator

Rebecca Jamieson CM OOnt
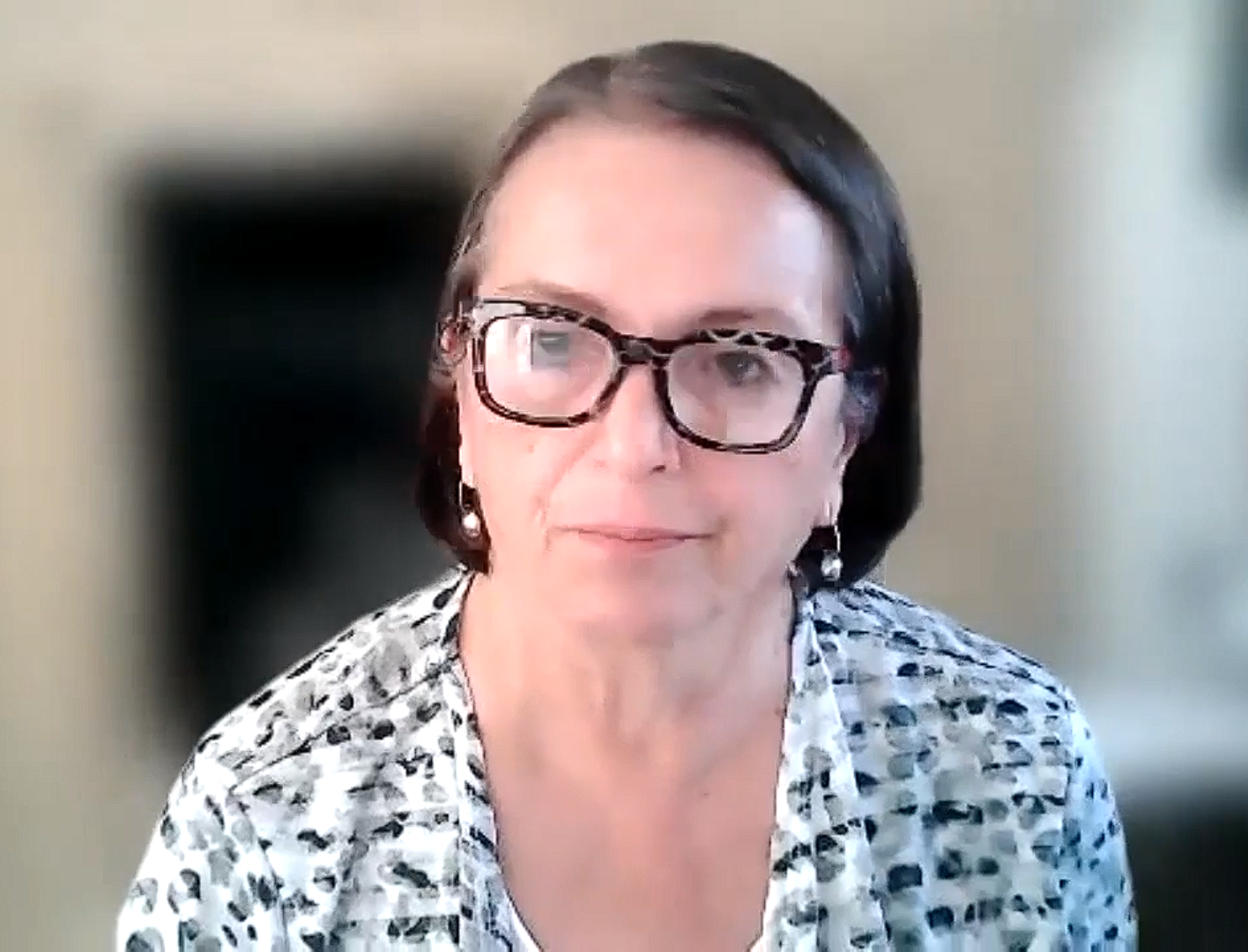
- Born: Michigan, United States
- Citizenship: Canadian, Tuscarora
- Education: Master of Education
- Alma mater: University of Toronto
- Occupation: Education administrator
- Years active: 1978–present
- Employer: Six Nations Polytechnic
- Title: President and CEO

Rebecca Jamieson CM OOnt is a Canadian Tuscarora educator and education administrator. Since the late 1970s she has worked to improve access to education on Six Nations of the Grand River, the most-populous First Nations reserve in Canada. Jamieson helped to found Six Nations Polytechnic (SNP), an indigenous educational institution, and was the organization’s president and CEO from 2009 to 2025.

For her work in advancing indigenous education, preserving culture and fostering reconciliation, Jamieson has been recognized with two honorary doctorates and membership in the Order of Ontario and the Order of Canada.

== Early life and education ==
Rebecca Jamieson was born in Michigan, in the Eel Clan of the Tuscarora people. When she was 2 years old, her family moved to Six Nations of the Grand River in Ontario, the most-populous First Nations reserve in Canada.

During the time of the Canadian Indian residential school system, which sought to assimilate aboriginal children, Jamieson found that her people were not represented in the school lessons. This sent a message to her that the reality she was being taught mattered more than her life at home. Jamieson felt the legacy of the residential schools, particularly Mohawk Institute Residential School, had caused lasting cultural divisions and that it was necessary for Six Nations to "reclaim education" as part of their recovery.

Jamieson received a Native Social Counsellor Certificate from the University of Toronto, and an Ontario Teacher Certificate from the Ontario Teacher Education College, Hamilton. She received a BA in psychology and philosophy from Wilfrid Laurier University, and Master of Education from the Ontario Institute for Studies in Education in 1978.

== Career ==
Jamieson began her career as a post-secondary student counsellor with Six Nations. She then worked as a teacher, a consultant, and director of student services with the Grand River Education Office. She helped found Grand River Polytechnic Institute (now Six Nations Polytechnic, SNP) in 1993. It has since grown into a leading indigenous institute in Ontario. In 2009 she became SNP's president and CEO.

Jamieson built partnerships between SNP and dozens of other aboriginal institutes, colleges and universities. These partnerships saw university courses taught at Six Nations, with diplomas and degrees offered through partner institutions. In 2017, SNP became the first indigenous institution to confer its own accredited degree which was also the world's first degree program for an indigenous language.

When the Truth and Reconciliation Commission released its findings and recommendations in 2015, Jamieson and SNP already had decades of experience in line with its "calls to action". However, she cautioned against making indigenous learning compulsory, noting, "You can't indigenize something that isn't Indigenous". She has preferred to instead work through mutual understanding and respect.

Jamieson has been increasingly sought after for her expertise. She served as the executive director of the College Standards and Accreditation Council (CSAC), and on the board of governors for several universities in Ontario. In 2017, Jamieson and SNP hosted the World Indigenous Peoples Conference on Indigenous Education (WIPCE) with 3,000 attendees.

== Awards and honors ==
- 2007 – Member of the Order of Ontario
- 2015 – Distinguished Fellow, Mohawk College
- 2015 – Honorary Doctorate of Laws (LLD), University of Western Ontario
- 2017 – Honorary Doctorate of Laws, Wilfrid Laurier University
- 2018 – Member of the Order of Canada (CM)
