= Canadian National Basketball League =

Canadian professional basketball league (2004)

The Canadian National Basketball League (CNBL) was a professional basketball league based in southern Ontario aiming to attract Canadian players who played overseas to join their league. In November 2002 they announced their inaugural season would be in the spring-summer of 2003. The CNBL made this announcement around the same time the Canadian Baseball League announced their schedule. Their inaugural season was later postponed until the summer of 2004. The league ceased operations sometime in 2004 with only playing a few exhibition games.

== Teams ==
The CNBL had 6 teams, all based in southern Ontario

- The Brantford Blaze, based in Brantford, Ontario, renamed themselves the Brantford Connexion and joined the Ontario Professional Basketball Association (OPBA) after the league ceased operations.
- The Durham Dragons, based in Durham Regional Municipality, Ontario, with a possible affiliation to an athletic organization. They currently operate a basketball camp.
- The London Orion, based in London, Ontario, joined the OPBA after the league ceased operations. They also operate a basketball camp.
- The Toronto Metro Xpress, based in Toronto, Ontario, currently operate a basketball camp.
- The Waterloo Wildhawks, based in Waterloo Regional Municipality, Ontario, currently operate a basketball camp.
- The Windsor Drive, based in Windsor, Ontario, currently operate a basketball camp.
