= Six Nations Polytechnic =

Post-secondary institute in Canada

Coordinates: 43.05979°N 80.09965°W

- Motto: You don't have to go far, to go far.
- Type: Indigenous Institute
- Established: 1993
- Affiliations: Crown–Indigenous Relations and Northern Affairs Canada, and the Ontario Ministry of Education,
- President: Rebecca Jamieson
- Undergraduates: university, and continuing education students
- Location: 2160 Fourth Line, Ohsweken, Ontario, Canada N0A 1M0
- Campus: Rural
- Website: snpolytechnic.com

Six Nations Polytechnic (SNP) is a Haudenosaunee-governed Indigenous institute on Six Nations of the Grand River First Nation. Indigenous institutes are the third pillar of post-secondary education in Ontario, as recognized by the Indigenous Institutes Act of 2017, The seven groups making up the Six Nations of the Grand River First Nation are the Mohawk, Cayuga, Onondaga, Oneida, Seneca, Tuscarora and Lenape. The Six Nations of the Grand River First Nation reserve acreage at present covers some 46,000 acres (190 km^{2}) near the city of Brantford, Ontario. Six Nations Polytechnic has two campuses, one located in Ohsweken and one located in Brantford.

Indigenous institutes partner with colleges and universities to offer students degree programs, apprenticeships, certificate programs and diploma programs. SNP was founded to provide greater access to post-secondary education for Indigenous peoples. SNP delivers post-secondary programs approved by the Ministry of Training, Colleges and Universities.

== History ==
Since 1993, Six Nations Polytechnic has offered college and university programs through agreements with public colleges and universities. On June 26, 2009 – the Indigenous Knowledge Centre and Ogweho:weh Diploma Programs [Gayogohó:non-Cayuga and Kayenkeha -Mohawk] were publicly launched with the signing of the Six Nations and McMaster University Collaborative Agreement. These university credit diploma programs will eventually become full degree programs for Haudenosaunee languages.

== Partnerships ==
Six Nations Polytechnic offers programs and courses of study in partnership with all levels of government; commissions; industries; commerce and post-secondary institutions.

== Scholarships and bursaries ==
SNP offers scholarships for First Nations and Métis students.

== Six Nations Achievement Centre ==
The Six Nations Achievement Centre was founded in 1993 as a community-based agency providing adults with tutoring in Literacy and Basic Skills, in a culturally sensitive manner to increase their academic skills for entry into higher level of education and/or to obtain employment. The funding is provided by the Ministry of Training, Colleges and Universities, Literacy and Basic Skills Branch. The Six Nations Achievement Centre is a member of the Brant Literacy Service Planning (LSP) and the Ontario Native Literacy Coalition.

== Campus ==
The main campus is a building located on 2160 Fourth Line in Ohsweken, Ontario.

A second campus is located at 411 Elgin Street in Brantford, Ontario.
