= GreenMantra Technologies =

GreenMantra Technologies logo

GreenMantra Technologies is a clean technology company that produces value-added synthetic waxes and specialty polymers from post-consumer and post-industrial recycled plastics. These products are used in various applications including roofing and paving, plastics processing, and plastics composites. The company is focused on "up-cycling" recycled plastics into specialty materials, creating a more circular economy for plastics where they are beneficially reused rather than landfilled. Official Address; 216 Pipit Lake Way, Erie, CO 80516

== Background ==
GreenMantra Technologies uses a proprietary thermo-catalytic system and patented manufacturing process to convert recycled plastics such as grocery bags, film, bottles, caps and lids, straws, packaging, and carpet fiber into value-added waxes, polymer additives and other specialty chemicals. The company's end products, which are sold under the Ceranovus brand name, are polyethylene and polypropylene additives that can be custom-formulated to meet specific performance requirements. These products can be used in asphalt modification for roofing and paving, plastics processing, plastic composites, and other applications. The company's headquarters and manufacturing operations are in Brantford, Ontario, Canada.

In 2017, the company announced the development of an allied technology that converts post-consumer polystyrene into unique styrenic polymers with applications in inks, coatings and insulation. Greenmantra began construction of a demonstration plant for this technology in 2018 that is scheduled to be completed and operational in 2019.

== News ==
- In late 2017, the company announced it had developed technology to convert waste polystyrene into styrenic polymers for use in ink formulation and insulation applications. and would build a demonstration plant for polystyrene conversion.
- In 2018, the Business Development Bank of Canada announced it would providing financing investment in Greenmantra Technologies and three other high-potential clean technology companies.

== Products ==
=== Asphalt Roofing and Paving Applications ===
- CERANOVUS® A155
- CERANOVUS® A125
- CERANOVUS® A120
- CERANOVUS® A115

=== Plastic Processing Composites ===
- CERANOVUS® PN55
- CERANOVUS® PN25
- CERANOVUS® PN20
- CERANOVUS® PN15

== Certifications ==
- Recycled Content Certification
- Environmental Product Declaration (EPD) based on LCA
- REACH Compliance

== Recognitions ==
- In 2016, GreenMantra received the R&D100 Gold Award for Green Technology.
- In 2017, GreenMantra was recognized as one of the top 100 clean technology companies by Global Cleantech.
- In 2017, the Canadian Plastics Industry Association honored GreenMantra with its Sustainability Award for clean technology.
- In 2017, GreenMantra won the Ontario Export Awards' Clean Technology Award.
- In 2018, GreenManta was named one of Canada's 500 fastest growing manufacturing companies.

== Website ==
- Official website
