= Brantford Airport =

Brantford Airport Brantford Municipal Airport
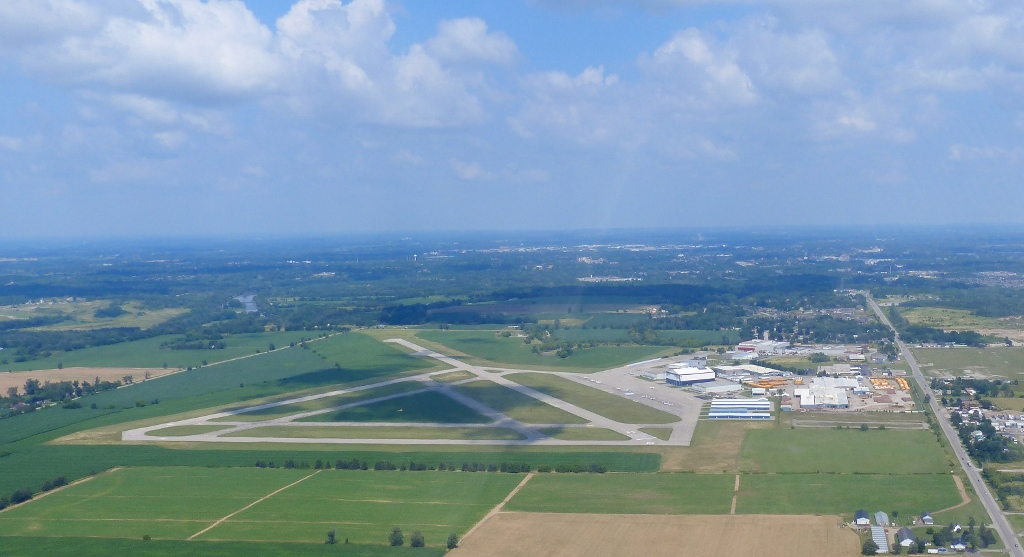
- CYFD from the west
- IATA: none; ICAO: CYFD

Summary
- Airport type: Public
- Owner/Operator: City of Brantford
- Serves: Brantford, Ontario
- Location: Brantford, Ontario
- Time zone: EST (UTC−05:00)
  - Summer (DST): EDT (UTC−04:00)
- Elevation AMSL: 815 ft (248 m)
- Coordinates: 43°07′57″N 080°20′29″W
- Website: www.BrantfordAirport.ca

Map
- Location in Ontario

Runways
Direction	Length		Surface
Direction	ft	m	Surface
05/23	5,036	1,535	Asphalt
11/29	2,626	800	Asphalt
17/35	2,626	800	Asphalt
- Source: Canada Flight Supplement

Brantford Airport (ICAO: CYFD), also known as Brantford Municipal Airport, is a registered aerodrome located 4 nautical miles (7.4 km; 4.6 mi) west southwest of the City of Brantford, in the County of Brant, Ontario, Canada.

There is a single fixed-base operator at the airport called Brantford Flight Centre. The airport is home to many of the area's general aviation aircraft. Aviation spare parts retailer Aircraft Spruce established its sole Canadian location here in 2008, with expansion plans announced in 2013. The airport is often used for film shoots; scenes from Welcome to Mooseport, Where The Truth Lies, and multiple Mayday episodes have been filmed there.

Although the airport has never had scheduled air service, weekly charters fly students of the W. Ross Macdonald School home to Sudbury, Timmins, Trenton, Ottawa and Sault Ste. Marie.

The airport is classified as an airport of entry by Nav Canada and is staffed by the Canada Border Services Agency (CBSA) on a call-out basis from the John C. Munro Hamilton International Airport. The CBSA officers at this airport currently can handle general aviation aircraft only, with no more than 15 people, including crew.

== History ==
In 1929, a public aerodrome was established near the present-day intersection of Fairview Drive and King George Road. The site is now used for a fire hall and residential housing. The airport opened at its present location on 11 November 1940 as No. 5 Service Flying Training School, a British Commonwealth Air Training Plan airfield operated by the Royal Canadian Air Force. The school closed on 3 November 1944. The aerodrome lands and management thereof remained in the hands of federal government until 27 April 1970 when the municipal government took over. In 2015, Roger Sharpe published Wings Above the Skyline, a local history book that tells the story of No. 5 Service Flying Training School.

The current terminal building was built in 1966.

The City of Brantford once looked at the possibility of closing the airport, but this move was widely opposed by local citizens, tenants, and users. In May 2007, Brantford City Council held a public forum to canvass views on the airport as a necessary service for the city. Many presentations made clear points that growing cities require airports as part of their fundamental infrastructure, to attract and retain corporate investment.

In January 2008, Brantford City Council voted unanimously to support the inclusion of $1.9 million in planned upgrades to airport infrastructure in the city's Capital Plan for Fiscal 2008. That allowed for repaving the main runway and a second runway that was last paved in the 1940s. In 2004, 2009 and 2011, new rows of hangars were built, with plans for more in the future.

In 2023, a study was launched to help the airport build its vision for the future. Recommendations should be ready for local leadership by early 2024. Focuses will be on utilizing airport facilities more efficiently and being even more welcoming to general aviation pilots as other airports push smaller traffic away.

== Facilities and aircraft ==
The airport has three runways, all paved with asphalt. Runway 05/23 is 5,036 ft × 100 ft (1,535 m × 30 m), and runways 11/29 and 17/35 both measure 2,626 ft × 100 ft (800 m × 30 m). Services at the airport include fuel, both avgas and jet fuel, as well as aircraft maintenance and parking, a crew lounge, snooze rooms, and rental cars.

== Accidents and incidents ==
- On 22 October 1994, a Cessna 172 Crashed on approach to the airport, killing the pilot and 1 passenger immediately, the sole survivor died after in hospital.
- Early in September 2014, a small aircraft crashed while on approach to the airport, killing one pilot.
- On 27 April 2016, a Cessna 182 Skylane flipped over on the runway, injuring one pilot.
- A plane was found crashed on the runway in the morning of 13 November 2018, with two deceased occupants.
- On 21 March 2022, a Cessna 172RG, C-GOFD, contacted terrain on approach to runway 29. The aircraft suffered major damage and was subsequently written off. The pilot, who was the sole occupant, initially survived the crash but succumbed to his injuries en route to hospital. An investigation into the accident revealed that there were no mechanical issues with the aircraft and controlled flight into terrain (CFIT) due to pilot error was the cause. The aircraft was equipped with a NemoScout 1C GPS monitoring device which recorded flight parameters such as position, altitude, ground speed, pitch and roll.
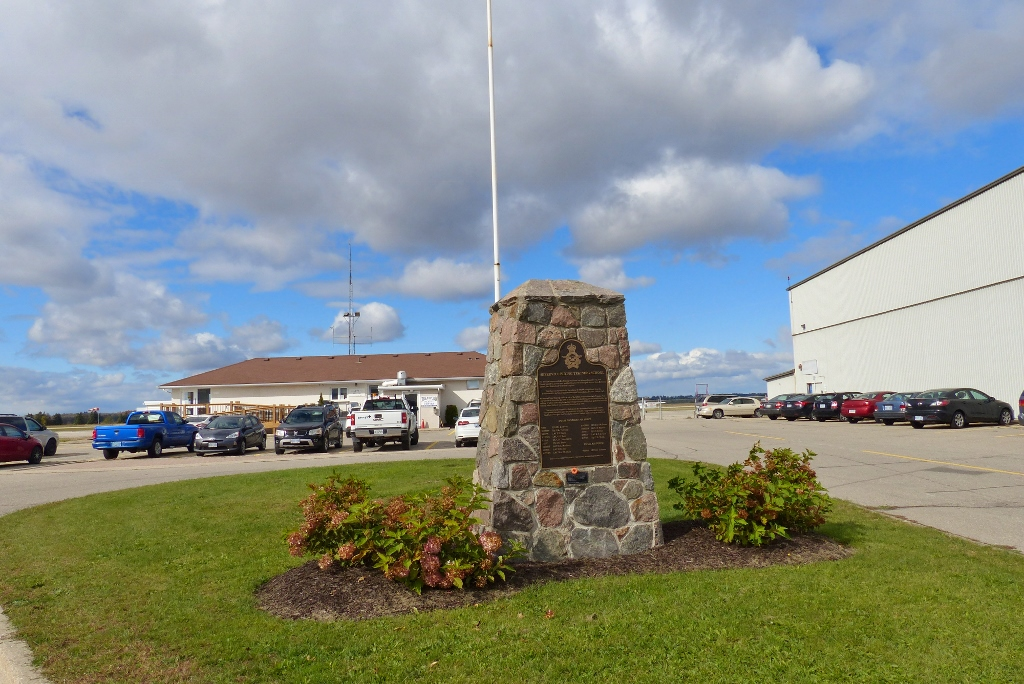
Main public area

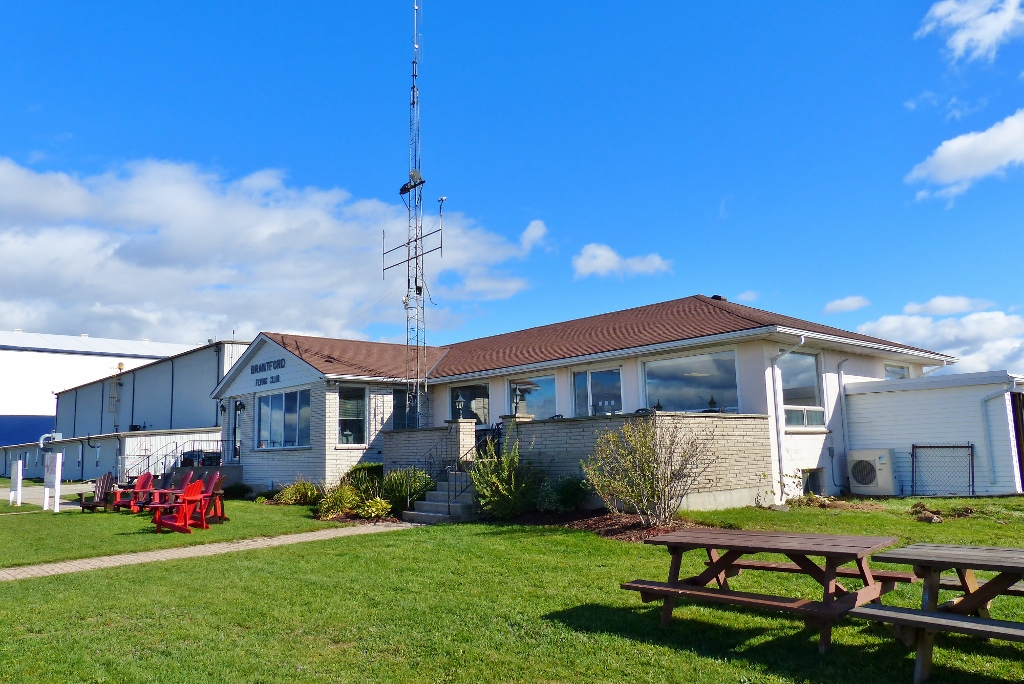
Terminal building

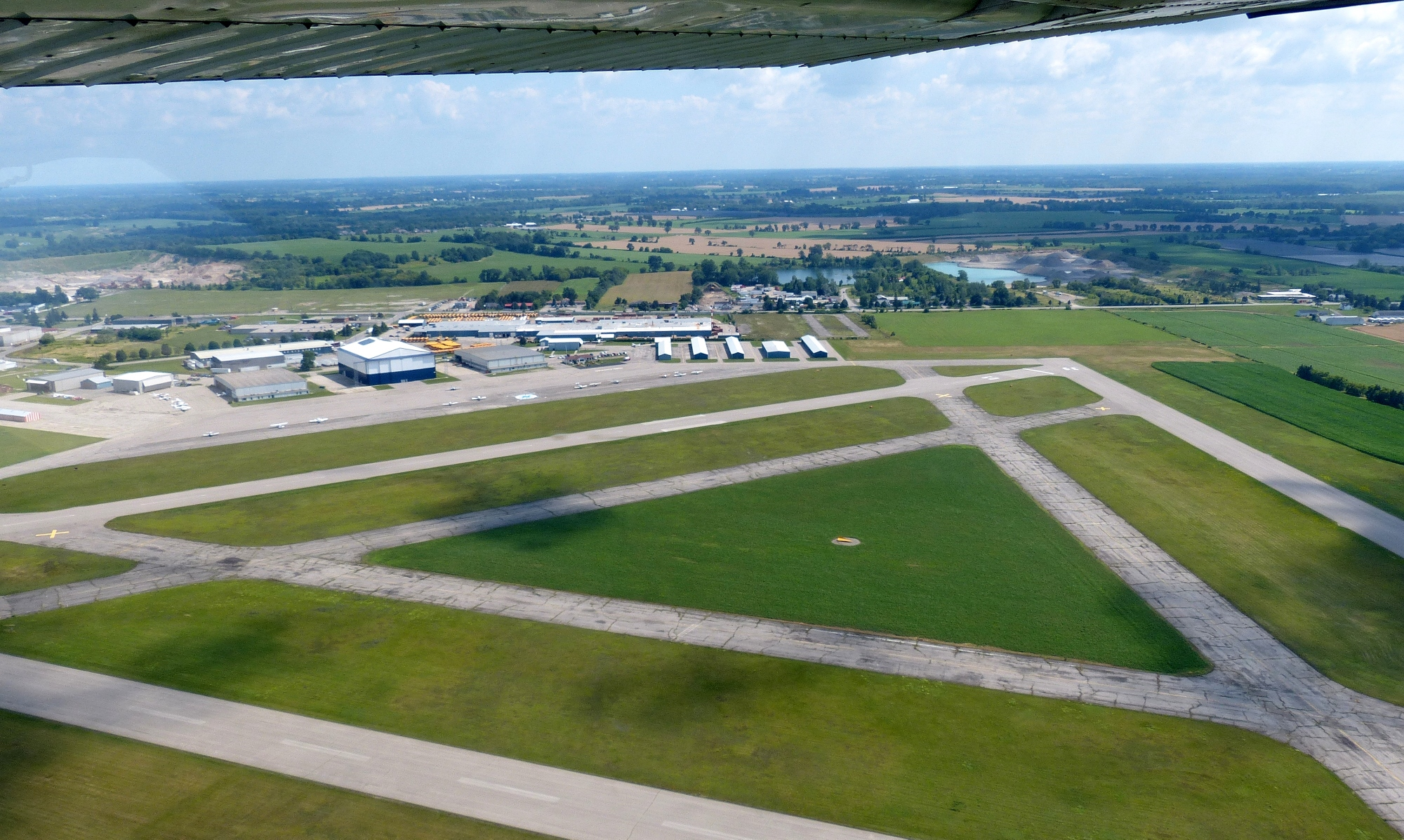
Runways (outer) and disused taxiways (inner)

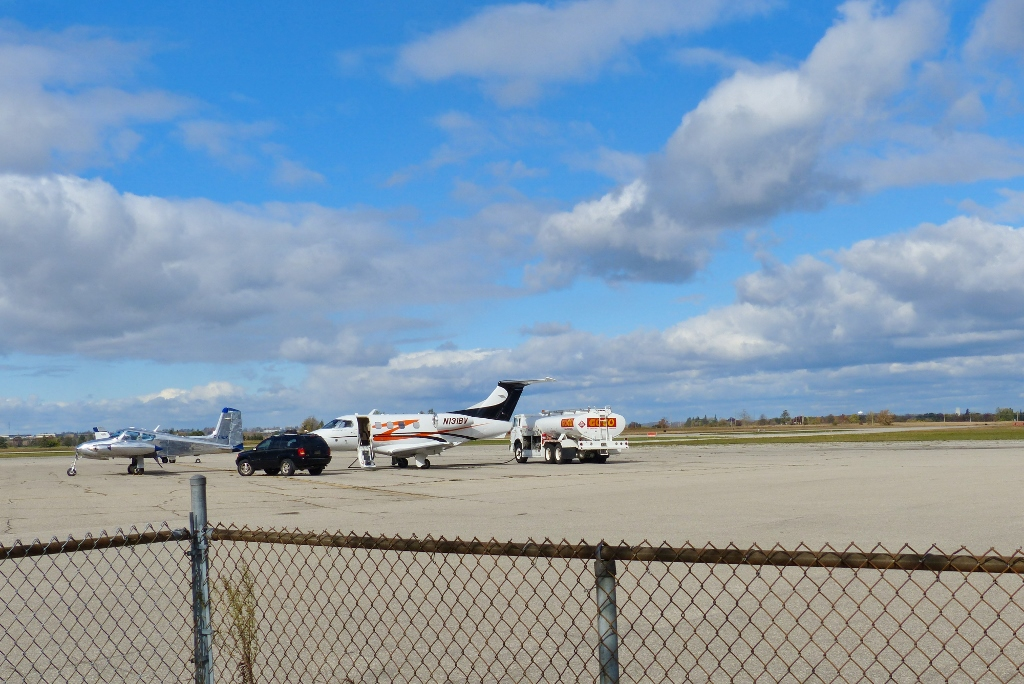
EMB-500 refuelling

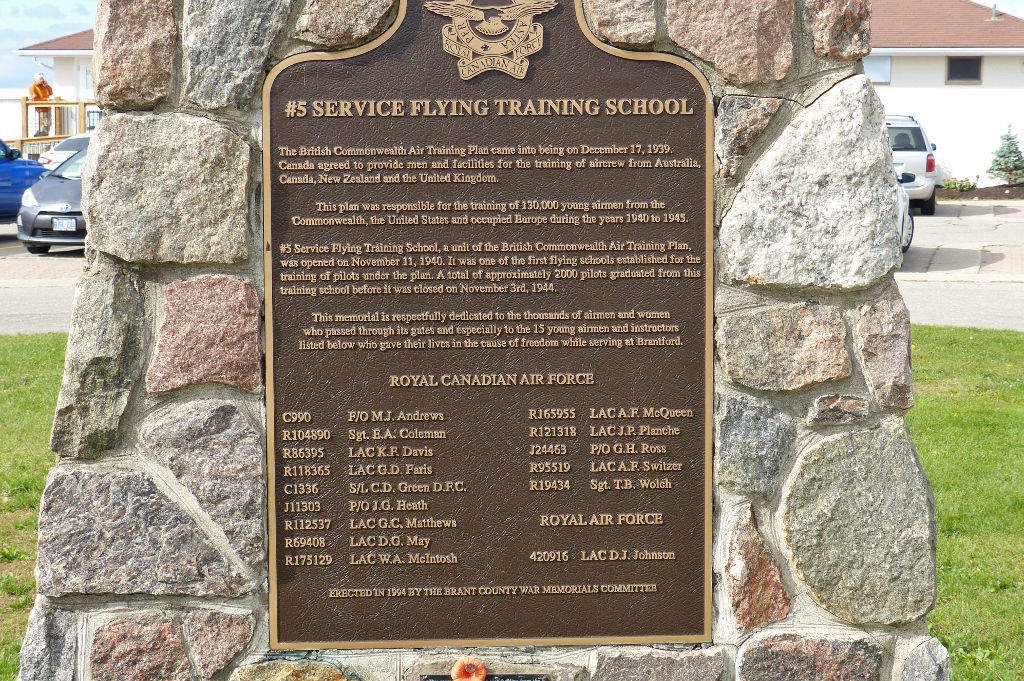
Plaque for No. 5 Service Flying Training School
