= Neutral Huron language =

Extinct Iroquoian language of North America

Neutral
- Neutral Huron
- Attawandaron/Attiwandaronk
- Native to: Canada
- Region: Ontario; also near Buffalo, New York
- Ethnicity: Neutral Nation
- Era: last attested 1671
- Language family: Iroquoian: Northern; Neutral

Language codes
- ISO 639-3: None (mis)
- Glottolog: neut1237

Neutral or Neutral Huron was the Iroquoian language spoken in the Neutral Confederacy.

The name Neutral, given to them by the French, was due to their neutrality in the Wendat Haudenosaunee wars. They were called Attawandaron by the Wendat, likely meaning 'they understand the language'.

Mithun (1979:145, 188–189) cites Jesuits pointing out that the Neutral language was different from the Wendat language, in that the Neutrals were "une Nation differente de langage, au moins en plusieurs choses" (Thwaites 21:188) / "a Nation different in language, at least in many respects" (Thwaites 21:189). Mithun further cites work by Roy Wright (Mithun 1979:160) where the latter notes from the Neutral name given to Chaumonot that the Neutral language did not have sound changes that distinguish Wendat from other Northern Iroquoian languages. Hanzeli (1969), referencing Thwaites (21:228–230), (Note: (p. 228) "Ce fut sans doute une prouidence de Dieu toute speciale, que le retardemẽt des Peres en ce lieu : car en vingt cinq iours qu'ils demeurerent en cette cabane, ils eurent le moyen d'ajuster le Dictionnaire, & les Peuples [sc. Regles] de la langue Huronne, à celle de ces Peuples, & faire vn ouurage qui seul meritoit qu'on fist un voyage de plusieurs années dans le païs : nos Sauuages se plaisans beaucoup plus auec ceux qui parlent leur propre langue, qu'auec ceux qui n'en font qu'approcher, qu'ils tiennent iusques là pour estrangers." / (p. 229–230) "The delay of the Fathers in this place was, doubtless, an exceptional providence of God: for, in the twenty-five days that they remained in this cabin, they were able to harmonize the Dictionary and the Syntax of the Huron language with those of these Tribes, and accomplish a work which of itself would deserve that one make a stay of several years in the country, -- as our Savages take much more pleasure in those who speak their own language than in those who only attempt it, and whom they consider for that reason as strangers.") notes Brébeuf and Chaumonot considered Neutral different enough from Wendat to write a separate Neutral grammar and dictionary, now lost.

Two proper names of Neutral are preserved, a town name ⟨Ounontisaston⟩ and its chief's name ⟨Souharissen⟩. The first may mean 'mountain corner' (cf. Huron /onõtiˈsahtih/), making Neutral an Iroquoian language.
