= Neutral Confederacy =

Historic Indigenous Confederation located in the Great Lakes region

Neutral Confederacy Attawandaron
- c.15th century–1651
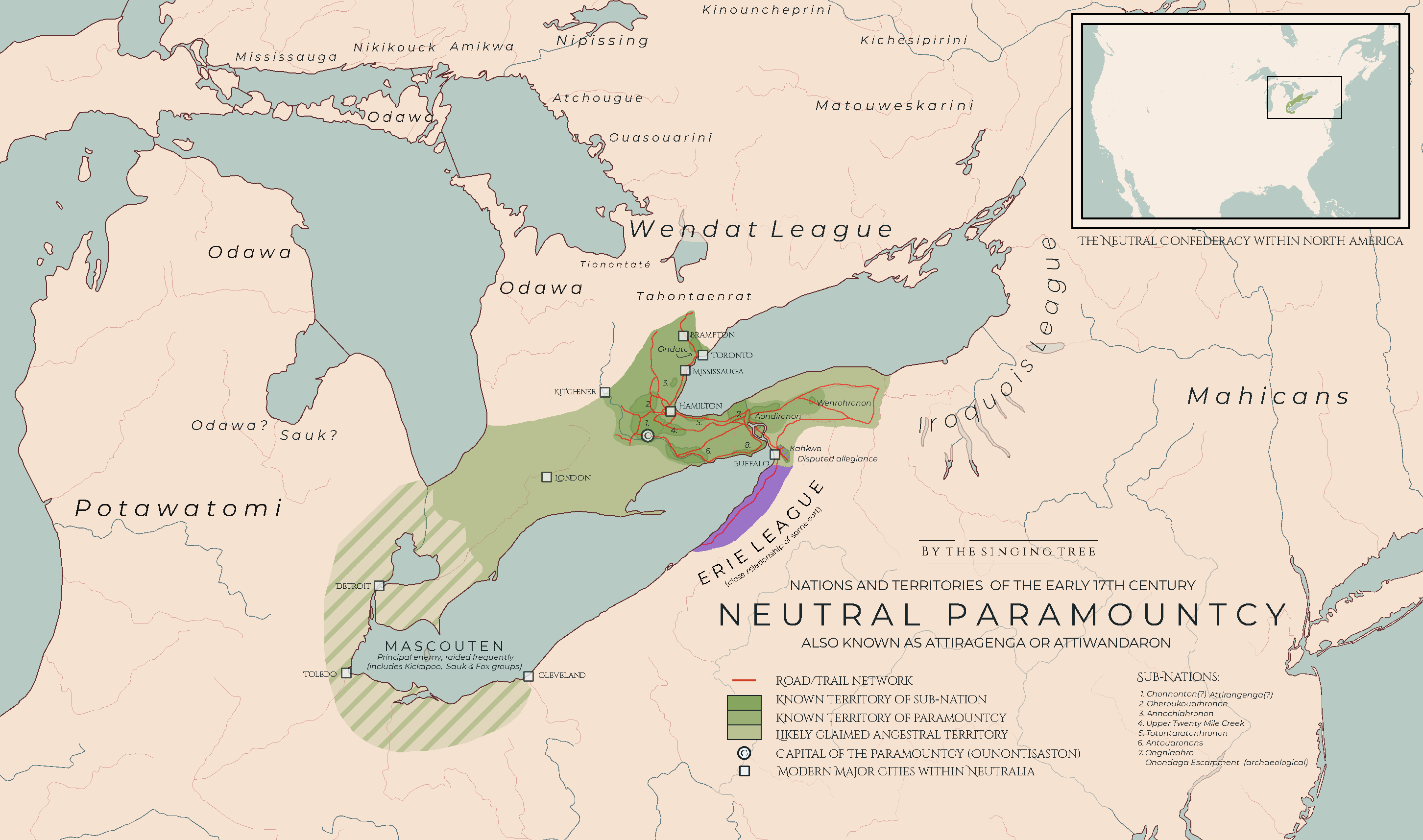
- Map showing the Neutral Confederacy in 1600.
- Status: Confederacy
- Capital: Ounontisaston
- Common languages: Neutral
- Demonym: Neutral
- Government: Confederation
- History
  - Established: c.15th century
  - Disestablished: 1651

Population
  - 1626: 40,000
  - 1640: 16,000
  - 1641: 12,000
- Today part of: Canada; United States

The Neutral Confederacy (also Neutral Nation, Neutral people, or Attawandaron) was a tribal confederation of Iroquoian peoples. Its heartland was along the Grand River and the eastern end of Lake Ontario in what is now Ontario, Canada. At its height, its wider territory extended west along the shores of Erie to Huron, and east to the Niagara River. To the northwest were the neighbouring territories of the Wendat and Petun who called the Neutral the Attawandaron. East of the Neutral and south of Lake Ontario was the five-nation Haudenosaunee Confederacy (Iroquois).

The Neutral often raided neighboring polities, often in conjunction with allies like the Odawa. They were frequently at war with an Algonquian-speaking confederacy of five nations who lived to the west known as the Mascouten, or Fire Nation.

The Neutral Confederacy were proficient hunters and traded furs and dressed deerskins to the Wendat in exchange for European goods which the Wendat had acquired from the French. The largest Neutral group was known as the Chonnonton ('keepers of the deer'), partly because of their practice of herding deer into pens, a strategy used while hunting. The Chonnonton territory also contained large deposits of flint, which was a valuable resource for sharp tools, fire-starting and, eventually, firearms, which, as a primary resource, allowed them to trade simultaneously with often-warring Wendat and Haudenosaunee tribes. Another group, the Onguiaahra whose name meant "near the big waters" or possibly "the strait," populated the Niagara Peninsula and allegedly account for the origin of the word "Niagara".

Since they were not at war with the Wendat or the Haudenosaunee in the early-1600s, Jesuits travelling in the area of what is now Hamilton, the lower Grand Valley and Niagara, called them the Neutrals. However, the confederacy had feuds with an Algonkian people called the Mascouten or "Fire Nation", who were believed to live in what is present-day Michigan. In 1616, the Neutral Confederacy had an estimated 40 villages and 4,000 warriors. In 1641, after a serious epidemic, the Jesuits counted 40 Neutral villages, with about 12,000 people.

The nation was unable to survive the changes. In 1651, after attacks by the Haudenosaunee in the Beaver Wars, they dispersed. One source indicates that the reasons included "wars, diseases and famine". The remaining members became a part of various other Iroquoian nations. Historical records kept by the French do not discuss the Neutrals as a nation or confederacy after 1672.

== Names ==
No endonym is decisively known for the people of this confederacy, but a variety of exonyms are used:

- The name "Neutral" reflects the terminology used by the French in the 17th century, including Samuel de Champlain who in 1615 referred to them as "the neutral nation" (French: la Nation neutre).
  - This referred to their attempts to remain neutral in the many wars between the confederacy of the Wendat people and the nations of the Haudenosaunee Confederacy.
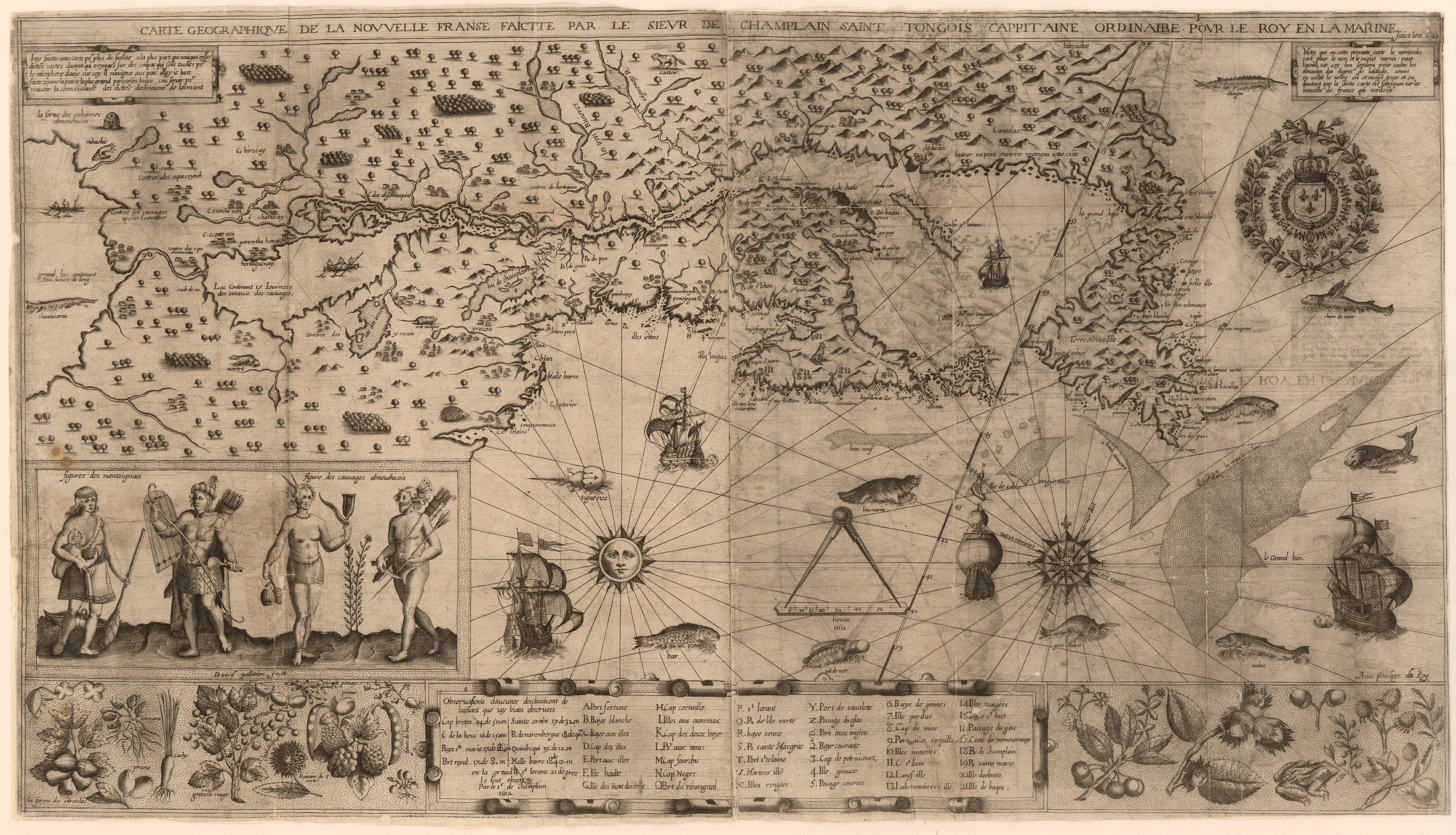
- Samuel de Champlain's 1612 map of New France including the term "chonnonton", possibly referring to the Neutrals.
  The name "Chonnonton" reflects a term used on Samuel de Champlain's 1612 "geographic map of New France" in the approximate location of the confederacy.
  - Some scholars argue that this reflects the Neutrals' name for themselves, and that it means 'people of the deer', or, more precisely, 'the people who tend or manage deer,' however, others claim that was a name for only one of the nations in the Confederacy.
  - In a 1976 analysis of Champlain's work, Conrad E. Heidenreich concluded that this term "almost certainly" referred to the Seneca ("Tsonnontouans").
- They were called "Attawandaron" (also spelled "Attiwandaron" or "Attiwandaronk") by the Wendat, according to 17th century Jesuit missionary records.
  - This has been interpreted as meaning "peoples of a slightly different language" or "people whose speech is awry".
  - An alternative interpretation is "they comprehend the words", based on the root word "ahronk" meaning "understanding a language".
- The Haudenosaunee called them Atirhagenrat (Atirhaguenrek) and Rhagenratka. Some of the tribes of the Neutral confederacy included the Aondironon, the Wenrehronon, and the Ongniaahraronon. They spoke Iroquoian languages but were culturally distinct from the Haudenosaunee and competed with them for the same resources.

== Geography ==
During the late 16th and the early 17th centuries, the territory of the Attawandaron, as they were called by the Wendat Nation, was mostly within the limits of present-day southern Ontario. The Museum of Ontario Archaeology summarizes that territory as follows:

they "inhabited dozens of villages in Southwestern Ontario stretching along the north shore of Lake Erie from the Niagara Peninsula to the Detroit River, perhaps as far north as Toronto in the east and Goderich in the west."

They had population concentrations on the Niagara Peninsula and in the vicinity of the present-day communities of Hamilton and Milton, Ontario. In addition to this main territory, there was a single population cluster to the east, across the Niagara River, near modern-day Buffalo, New York, which was west of the Wenro people.

Souharissen was a warrior chief who lived in a village called Ounontisatan, which was visited by the French in 1625–1626. His trade agreement with the Neutral people provided protection for them by his warriors. The principal headman took on and defeated the Fire Nation in what is present-day Michigan. The Recollect priest Joseph de La Roche Daillon lived with him for five months in the winter of 1626–1627. Daillon visited 28 Neutral villages, including the capital, which the French referred to as Nôtre Dame des Anges. The fertile flats of the various oxbows that Big Creek makes three miles from its mouth at Grand River, were ideal for long-term settlement. Noble uses the term "Neutralia" to designate the concentration of Iroquoian-speaking natives in the area.

F. Douglas Reville's The History of the County of Brant (1920) said that the hunting grounds of the Attawandaron ranged from Genesee Falls and Sarnia and south of a line drawn from Toronto to Goderich.

During their travels, Jean de Brébeuf and Pierre Joseph Marie Chaumonot gave each Neutral village a Christian name. The only ones that are mentioned in their writings were Kandoucho, or All Saints, the nearest to the Wendat Nation; Onguioaahra, on the Niagara River; Teotongniaton or St. William, in the centre of their country; and Khioetoa, or St. Michel (near what is now Windsor, Ontario).

Reville described their territory as having been heavily forested and full of "wild fruit trees of vast variety," with nut trees, berry bushes, and wild grape vines. "Elk, caribou, and black bear; deer, wolves, foxes, martens and wild cats filled the woods."

According to the City of Waterloo, Ontario, the Indigenous people who lived in the area in the precontact era included the Neutral Confederacy. In 2020, a site in nearby Kitchener, Ontario was found to include artifacts from an Iroquioan village that was inhabited circa 1300 to 1600. Archeologists found some 35,000 objects including stone tools and a 4,000 year old arrowhead. Another source states that the site "is among a cluster of Attawandaron villages in this part of the region". In 1976, a Neutral Confederacy cemetery was unearthed in Grimsby, Ontario. The area that now comprises Morriston in Puslinch, Ontario is said to have been inhabited by the Neutral Confederacy, in a village of 4,000. This region may have had the largest Neutral Confederacy settlement in Ontario, at one time.

Onondaga chert was plentiful in Neutral lands due to the presence of the Onondaga Limestone formation. This tool stone was also available to the Five Nations in their own lands, but not to other neighbouring peoples. The Neutral territory marked the furthest northern and western extent of useable chert deposits, even though the Onondaga Limestone runs further.

== History ==
The Neutrals had an alliance with the Wenrohronon to defend against the Haudenosaunee Confederacy. That ended in 1639, which devastated the Wenrohronon. The Wenrohronon then made an alliance with the Wendat, who were located farther away and could not offer much support.

Traveling south from Midland, Ontario, Étienne Brûlé passed through the Attawandaron territory circa 1615 and spent a winter among the Nation, during 1625–1626. A Franciscan Récollet, Father Joseph de La Roche Daillon, spent time with the Nation in 1626 and estimated the population as 40,000 at that time. About 14 years later, Brébeuf and Chaumonot visited 18 Neutral Confederacy settlements and stayed in ten villages. By that time, the estimated population was only "about 12,000 people and 4,000 warriors in about 40 villages and hamlets".

After destroying the Wendat, the Haudenosaunee attacked the Neutrals. Around 1650, during a period that is now loosely referred to as the Beaver Wars, referring to the theft of furs, the Haudenosaunee Confederacy declared war on the Attawandaron. Some historians state that the Haudenosaunee destroyed the Neutral society, which ended as a separate entity in 1651. However, the Neutral population had already been reduced by diseases such as smallpox and measles carried by Europeans. By 1652, the Haudenosaunee had also destroyed the Wendat, Petun and Erie Nations. Some of the Neutrals were incorporated into Seneca villages in upstate New York, and others were absorbed into various other societies. The Kenjockety family, one of the last known families to trace their ethnicity to the Neutrals, still lives among the Senecas.

Anthropologist Jackes discussed the year 1651 as particularly significant: "during the final Iroquois onslaught...the Neutral fled into the woods and dispersed for the last time ... The years of famine and disease no doubt contributed to the rout".

The last reference to the Neutrals as an independent society is from the fall of 1653. A historical mention in 1864 refers to the "Huron de la nation neutre" and "Hurons neutres" (neutral Hurons).

== Society and culture ==
The Neutral Confederacy had much in common with the Petun Nation and may have had shared ancestry. The Jesuit Relations in 1652 describes tattooing among the Petun (also called the Tobacco Nation) as well as the Neutrals: "And this (tattooing) in some nations is so common that in the one which we called the Tobacco, and... the Neutral. I know not whether a single individual was found, who was not painted in this manner, on some part of the body."

The Museum of Ontario Archeology describes the society as "semi-nomadic", living in villages for about 20 years before abandoning a site after depleting the game and the soil of the area. A historian in 1997 stated that the Nation "also made use of hamlets, agricultural field cabins, specialized camps ... and cemeteries. Another source describes the Neutrals as a "hunter-gatherer society who lived in longhouses that sheltered multiple families". Research conducted by anthropologist Mary Jackes states that they remained neutral "in the conflicts between the Haudenosaunee from south of the Great Lakes and the Ontario Iroquoians who lived to the north" and thrived through active trading instead of war, although the Wendat nation aggressively worked to prevent trade between the Neutrals and the French.

The chief of 28 villages, villas, and towns in the last years of the Neutral confederacy was named Tsouharissen or Souharissen ("Child of the Sun") who led several raids against the Mascouten (or "The Fire Nation"), who lived in territory in present-day Michigan and Ohio. A 1627 report called him the chief of all of the nation (Neutrals). Tsouharissen died around 1646. Within a generation (by the early 1670s), all of the nearby first nations, the Erie, the Wendat, Neutrals, Tobacco tribes, and even the fierce Susquehannocks would all fall between rampaging epidemic diseases or in the bloody Beaver Wars between themselves and/or to the last tribe standing with any significant military power, the Haudenosaunee.

=== Flintworking and trade ===
The Neutrals quarried Onondaga chert from the Onondaga Limestone formation in their lands. Prior to European contact, they used this chert as a tool stone for arrowheads, bifaces, and other weapons and tools. This extended into the protohistoric and post-contact periods, and has been documented at sites associated with the Onondaga, Oneida, and St. Lawrence Iroquoians. It was superior for toolmaking to other local chert varieties around the St. Lawrence Lowlands.

That important resource was used to make spearheads and arrowheads and so gave the Neutrals the power to maintain their neutrality. Once the neighbours began receiving firearms through trade with the Europeans, however, the possession of the flint grounds was much less of an advantage. Flints were still used in trade for the flintlocks on guns. The Neutral continued to trade commodities such as maize, tobacco, and black squirrel and other high-grade furs for steel axes, glass beads, cloaks, conch shells, gourd containers, and firearms.

=== Language ===
Records left by Jesuit priests in the 1600s indicate that the Neutral language was similar to Huron and so was in the Iroquoian family. They believed that all three groups had once been a part of a single group.

Their neighbours, the Wendat (or Huron) Nation referred to the Neutrals (Chonnonton) impolitely as "Attawandaron," meaning "Those whose speech is awry" because their dialect was different. (Apparently, the Chonnonton referred to the Wendat by the same term.) Because the language of the Neutral Confederacy has been extinct for more than three centuries, little is known about the Neutrals' language. Mithun (1979:145, 188–189) cites Jesuits pointing out that the Neutral language was different from the Wendat language, in that the Neutrals were "vne Nation differente de langage, au moins en plusieurs choses" (Thwaites 21.188) / "a Nation different in language, at least in many respects" (Thwaites 21.189). Mithun further cites work by Roy Wright (Mithun 1979:160) where the latter notes from the Neutral name given to Chaumonot that the Neutral language did not have sound changes that distinguish Wendat from other Northern Iroquoian languages. Hanzeli (1969), referencing Thwaites (21:228–230), (Note: (p. 228) "Ce fut sans doute vne prouidence de Dieu toute speciale, que le retardemẽt des Peres en ce lieu : car en vingt cinq iours qu'ils demeurerent en cette cabane, ils eurent le moyen d'ajuster le Dictionnaire, & les Peuples [sc. Regles] de la langue Huronne, à celle de ces Peuples, & faire vn ouurage qui seul meritoit qu'on fist vn voyage de plusieurs années dans le païs : nos Sauuages se plaisans beaucoup plus auec ceux qui parlent leur propre langue, qu'auec ceux qui n'en font qu'approcher, qu'ils tiennent iusques là pour estrangers." / (pp. 229–230) "The delay of the Fathers in this place was, doubtless, an exceptional providence of God: for, in the twenty-five days that they remained in this cabin, they were able to harmonize the Dictionary and the Syntax of the Huron language with those of these Tribes, and accomplish a work which of itself would deserve that one make a stay of several years in the country, – as our Savages take much more pleasure in those who speak their own language than in those who only attempt it, and whom they consider for that reason as strangers.") notes Brébeuf and Chaumonot considered Neutral different enough from Wendat to write a separate Neutral grammar and dictionary, now lost.

== Archaeology ==
The Southwold Earthworks, near St. Thomas, Ontario, contains the remains of a pre-contact Neutral village and is a National Historic Site of Canada. It is known for conspicuous earthworks, which were rare in southern Ontario, and are well preserved.

The Museum of Ontario Archaeology in London, Ontario, is located adjacent to the Lawson site. It is another 500-year-old Neutral village which has been under study since the early 1900s. An Ontario historical plaque commemorates the site, which was occupied by Neutrals in the 1500s. About 1000 to 2000 people lived in longhouses in the fortified community. Scientific excavation was first completed in 1921–1923, when the site was owned by the Lawson family. The searches have recovered 30,000 artifacts and the remains of 19 longhouses. Some of the longhouses and the pallisade have been reconstructed.

The McMaster University professor William Noble has excavated and documented the existence of many villages southwest of Hamilton, comprising a Neutral Confederacy, which he believes to have been centred at the Walker site and was presided over by the chief Souharissen. Noble was instrumental in excavating and documenting other Neutral sites in Thorold, Grimsby, and Binbrook. Reports from those and other Southern Ontario sites near Milton (Crawford Lake) and Oakville have indicated that the Neutral Confederacy hunted not only deer but also elk, moose, beaver, raccoons, squirrels, black bear, fox and muskrat. The remains of catfish, whitefish, salmon and trout were also common at many of the sites.

In 1983–1985, another site was excavated. One of the largest Attawandaron villages, the location covered 13 acres of the Badenoch section of Puslinch, on the east side of Morriston, Ontario. The estimated population of the Ivan Elliot site was 4,000; the Neutrals lived in longhouses and used the village for about 20 years. Another nearby site, on the McPhee farm, owned by Raymond Reid, was excavated in 1983. The village had a population of about 1,000 around 1500–1530.

The Neutral Confederacy decline and eventual end can be attributed to genocide. The final catastrophe that led to its end by the early 1650s was investigated by the archaeologist Mary Jackes. The demise of the Neutral Confederacy occurred in spite of reports by the French, who first met it, "in 1610 as strong, healthy and numerous. They lived in the most fertile and warmest part of Ontario. They were determined to remain neutral in the conflicts between the Haudenosaunee from south of the Great Lakes and the Ontario Iroquoians who lived to the north of the Neutral. They throve on trade, rather than war." Jackes re-examined French reports including the Jesuit Relations and the artefacts found in the Grimsby site.

When grounds were prepared for a new housing development in Grimsby, Ontario, in 1976, a Neutral Confederacy burial site was uncovered in sheltered embayment of the Niagara Escarpment. The excavation by Kenyon was closed after only two months in 1977, and the skeletons were reburied near the original site. It was estimated that over 100 bodies were recovered at the time. "Natural disruption, disease, famine and years of severe weather would have been sufficient to begin population decline. Intensifying war, with many killed, taken captive or forced to become refugees, led to almost complete population collapse." Jackes suggested that this burial site "had significance and that it was a place of refuge... especially for women and children."

A large village site found and excavated by Archaeologix, Inc. in Tillsonburg, Ontario, in 2000-2001, is unique for the absence of a pallisade, suggesting central location not needing protection. The site, in southwestern Ontario, is on a southern incline of the height of land for Lake Erie's central north shore, west of the Grand River, which flows south into Lake Erie; the watershed of the west-flowing Thames River is the other side of the height of land. The village "covered in excess of 8 hectares (20 acres), making it the largest known pre-contact Iroquoian village of its time in southern Ontario. The combination of the extremely large village size and the dispersed community pattern represents a site type that has not been previously documented for the Middle to Late Iroquoian period in southern Ontario."

Though driven by Haudenosaunee from their territory in the 1650s, the Neutral name remained attached to it as the "Neuter Nation" at least until the 1836 map of North American Native Nations by Swiss-American politician, diplomat, and ethnographer Albert Gallatin.

== See also ==
- Beaver Wars
- Kandoucho
- Petun
