= List of House members of the 45th Parliament of Canada =

This is a list of members of the House of Commons of Canada in the 45th Canadian Parliament, elected in the 2025 Canadian federal election.

Standings in the 45th Canadian Parliament
Affiliation	House members			Senate members		
Affiliation	2025 election results	Oct. 2026	+/–	On election day 2025	Oct. 2026	+/–
Liberal	169	173	▲4	–	–	Steady
Conservative	144	137	▼7	12	13	▲1
Bloc Québécois	22	21	▼1	–	–	Steady
New Democratic	7	5	▼2	–	–	Steady
Green	1	1	Steady	–	–	Steady
Independent Senators Group	–	–	Steady	45	37	▼8
Canadian Senators Group	–	–	Steady	18	15	▼3
Progressive Senate Group	–	–	Steady	18	17	▼1
Government Representative’s Office	–	–	Steady	–	5	▲5
Independent or non-affiliated	–	–	Steady	12	5	▼7
Total members	343	337		105	93	
Vacant	0	6	▲6	0	12	▲12
Total seats	343			105		
* As of 23 September 2026

== Members ==
Key:

- Party leaders are italicized.
- Cabinet ministers are in **boldface**.
- The prime minister is **both**.
- The speaker is indicated by "†".
- Parliamentary secretaries is indicated by "‡".

=== Alberta ===
Name	Party	Electoral district	First elected / previously elected	No. of terms
Blake Richards	Conservative	Airdrie—Cochrane	2008	6th term
Damien Kurek (until June 17, 2025)	Conservative	Battle River—Crowfoot	2019	3rd term
Pierre Poilievre (From August 18, 2025)	Conservative	Battle River—Crowfoot	2004, (Note: Nepean—Carleton/Carleton (Ontario)) 2025	8th term*
David Bexte	Conservative	Bow River	2025	1st term
Greg McLean	Conservative	Calgary Centre	2019	3rd term
Corey Hogan‡	Liberal	Calgary Confederation	2025	1st term
Pat Kelly	Conservative	Calgary Crowfoot	2015	4th term
Jasraj Singh Hallan	Conservative	Calgary East	2019	3rd term
Shuvaloy Majumdar	Conservative	Calgary Heritage	2023	2nd term
Dalwinder Gill	Conservative	Calgary McKnight	2025	1st term
Stephanie Kusie	Conservative	Calgary Midnapore	2017	4th term
Michelle Rempel Garner	Conservative	Calgary Nose Hill	2011	5th term
Tom Kmiec	Conservative	Calgary Shepard	2015	4th term
Dave McKenzie	Conservative	Calgary Signal Hill	2025	1st term
Amanpreet Gill	Conservative	Calgary Skyview	2025	1st term
**Eleanor Olszewski**	Liberal	Edmonton Centre	2025	1st term
Tim Uppal	Conservative	Edmonton Gateway	2008, (Note: Edmonton—Sherwood Park) 2019	5th term*
Kerry Diotte	Conservative	Edmonton Griesbach	2015, 2025	3rd term*
Ziad Aboultaif	Conservative	Edmonton Manning	2015	4th term
Billy Morin	Conservative	Edmonton Northwest	2025	1st term
Matt Jeneroux	Conservative (Note: Jeneroux was originally elected as a Conservative but crossed the floor to join the Liberals on February 18, 2026)	Edmonton Riverbend	2015	4th term
Matt Jeneroux	Liberal	Edmonton Riverbend	2015	4th term
Jagsharan Singh Mahal	Conservative	Edmonton Southeast	2025	1st term
Heather McPherson	NDP	Edmonton Strathcona	2019	3rd term
Kelly McCauley	Conservative	Edmonton West	2015	4th term
John Barlow	Conservative	Foothills	2014	5th term
Laila Goodridge	Conservative	Fort McMurray—Cold Lake	2021	2nd term
Chris Warkentin	Conservative	Grande Prairie	2006	7th term
Shannon Stubbs	Conservative	Lakeland	2015	4th term
Mike Lake	Conservative	Leduc—Wetaskiwin	2006	7th term
Rachael Thomas	Conservative	Lethbridge	2015	4th term
Glen Motz	Conservative	Medicine Hat—Cardston—Warner	2016	4th term
Dane Lloyd	Conservative	Parkland	2017	4th term
Arnold Viersen	Conservative	Peace River—Westlock	2015	4th term
Blaine Calkins	Conservative	Ponoka—Didsbury	2006	7th term
Burton Bailey	Conservative	Red Deer	2025	1st term
Garnett Genuis	Conservative	Sherwood Park—Fort Saskatchewan	2015	4th term
Michael Cooper	Conservative	St. Albert—Sturgeon River	2015	4th term
William Stevenson	Conservative	Yellowhead	2025	1st term

=== British Columbia ===
Name	Party	Electoral district	First elected / previously elected	No. of terms
Sukhman Gill	Conservative	Abbotsford—South Langley	2025	1st term
Wade Chang	Liberal	Burnaby Central	2025	1st term
Terry Beech	Liberal	Burnaby North—Seymour	2015	4th term
Todd Doherty	Conservative	Cariboo—Prince George	2015	4th term
Mark Strahl	Conservative	Chilliwack—Hope	2011	5th term
Tamara Jansen	Conservative	Cloverdale—Langley City	2019, 2024	3rd term*
Rob Morrison	Conservative	Columbia—Kootenay—Southern Rockies	2019	3rd term
Ron McKinnon	Liberal	Coquitlam—Port Coquitlam	2015	4th term
Gord Johns	NDP	Courtenay—Alberni	2015	4th term
Jeff Kibble	Conservative	Cowichan—Malahat—Langford	2025	1st term
**Jill McKnight**	Liberal	Delta	2025	1st term
**Stephanie McLean**	Liberal	Esquimalt—Saanich—Sooke	2025	1st term
Gurbux Saini	Liberal	Fleetwood—Port Kells	2025	1st term
Mel Arnold	Conservative	Kamloops—Shuswap—Central Rockies	2015	4th term
Frank Caputo	Conservative	Kamloops—Thompson—Nicola	2021	2nd term
**Stephen Fuhr**	Liberal	Kelowna	2015, 2025	2nd term*
Tako van Popta	Conservative	Langley Township—Fraser Heights	2019	3rd term
Brad Vis	Conservative	Mission—Matsqui—Abbotsford	2019	3rd term
Tamara Kronis	Conservative	Nanaimo—Ladysmith	2025	1st term
Jake Sawatzky	Liberal	New Westminster—Burnaby—Maillardville	2025	1st term
Aaron Gunn	Conservative	North Island—Powell River	2025	1st term
Jonathan Wilkinson (Until June 22, 2026)	Liberal	North Vancouver—Capilano	2015	4th term
Braeden Caley (From August 31, 2026)	Liberal	North Vancouver—Capilano	2026	1st term
Dan Albas	Conservative	Okanagan Lake West—South Kelowna	2011	5th term
Marc Dalton	Conservative	Pitt Meadows—Maple Ridge	2019	3rd term
Zoe Royer	Liberal	Port Moody—Coquitlam	2025	1st term
Bob Zimmer	Conservative	Prince George—Peace River—Northern Rockies	2011	5th term
Chak Au	Conservative	Richmond Centre—Marpole	2025	1st term
Parm Bains	Liberal	Richmond East—Steveston	2021	2nd term
Elizabeth May	Green	Saanich—Gulf Islands	2011	5th term
Helena Konanz	Conservative	Similkameen—South Okanagan—West Kootenay	2025	1st term
Ellis Ross	Conservative	Skeena—Bulkley Valley	2025	1st term
Ernie Klassen‡	Liberal	South Surrey—White Rock	2025	1st term
**Randeep Sarai**	Liberal	Surrey Centre	2015	4th term
Sukh Dhaliwal	Liberal	Surrey Newton	2006, 2015	6th term*
Hedy Fry	Liberal	Vancouver Centre	1993	11th term
Jenny Kwan	NDP	Vancouver East	2015	4th term
**Gregor Robertson**	Liberal	Vancouver Fraserview—South Burnaby	2025	1st term
Taleeb Noormohamed‡	Liberal	Vancouver Granville	2021	2nd term
Don Davies (Note: Interim Leader of the NDP from May 5, 2025 to March 29, 2026.) (Note: Parliamentary Leader of the NDP since April 10, 2026.)	NDP	Vancouver Kingsway	2008	6th term
Wade Grant‡	Liberal	Vancouver Quadra	2025	1st term
Scott Anderson	Conservative	Vernon—Lake Country—Monashee	2025	1st term
Will Greaves	Liberal	Victoria	2025	1st term
Patrick Weiler	Liberal	West Vancouver—Sunshine Coast—Sea to Sky Country	2019	3rd term

=== Manitoba ===
Name	Party	Electoral district	First elected / previously elected	No. of terms
Grant Jackson	Conservative	Brandon—Souris	2025	1st term
**Rebecca Chartrand**	Liberal	Churchill—Keewatinook Aski	2025	1st term
Colin Reynolds	Conservative	Elmwood—Transcona	2025	1st term
Raquel Dancho	Conservative	Kildonan—St. Paul	2019	3rd term
Branden Leslie	Conservative	Portage—Lisgar	2023	2nd term
Ted Falk	Conservative	Provencher	2013	5th term
Dan Mazier	Conservative	Riding Mountain	2019	3rd term
James Bezan	Conservative	Selkirk—Interlake—Eastman	2004	8th term
Ginette Lavack‡	Liberal	St. Boniface—St. Vital	2025	1st term
Leah Gazan	NDP	Winnipeg Centre	2019	3rd term
Kevin Lamoureux‡	Liberal	Winnipeg North	2010	6th term
Terry Duguid	Liberal	Winnipeg South	2015	4th term
Ben Carr	Liberal	Winnipeg South Centre	2023	2nd term
Doug Eyolfson	Liberal	Winnipeg West	2015, 2025	2nd term*

=== New Brunswick ===
Name	Party	Electoral district	First elected / previously elected	No. of terms
Serge Cormier	Liberal	Acadie—Bathurst	2015	4th term
**Dominic LeBlanc**	Liberal	Beauséjour	2000	9th term
David Myles‡	Liberal	Fredericton—Oromocto	2025	1st term
Rob Moore	Conservative	Fundy Royal	2004, 2019	7th term*
Guillaume Deschênes-Thériault	Liberal	Madawaska—Restigouche	2025	1st term
Michael Dawson	Conservative	Miramichi—Grand Lake	2025	1st term
Ginette Petitpas Taylor	Liberal	Moncton—Dieppe	2015	4th term
**Wayne Long**	Liberal	Saint John—Kennebecasis	2015	4th term
John Williamson	Conservative	Saint John—St. Croix	2011, 2019	4th term*
Richard Bragdon	Conservative	Tobique—Mactaquac	2019	3rd term

=== Newfoundland and Labrador ===
Name	Party	Electoral district	First elected / previously elected	No. of terms
Paul Connors	Liberal	Avalon	2025	1st term
Tom Osborne‡	Liberal	Cape Spear	2025	1st term
Clifford Small	Conservative	Central Newfoundland	2021	2nd term
Philip Earle	Liberal	Labrador	2025	1st term
Carol Anstey	Conservative	Long Range Mountains	2025	1st term
**Joanne Thompson**	Liberal	St. John's East	2021	2nd term
Jonathan Rowe	Conservative	Terra Nova—The Peninsulas	2025	1st term

=== Nova Scotia ===
Name	Party	Electoral district	First elected / previously elected	No. of terms
Chris d'Entremont	Conservative (Note: d'Entremont was originally elected as a Conservative but crossed the floor to join the Liberals on November 4, 2025)	Acadie—Annapolis	2019	3rd term
Chris d'Entremont	Liberal	Acadie—Annapolis	2019	3rd term
Jaime Battiste‡	Liberal	Cape Breton—Canso—Antigonish	2019	3rd term
**Sean Fraser**	Liberal	Central Nova	2015	4th term
Alana Hirtle	Liberal	Cumberland—Colchester	2025	1st term
Darren Fisher	Liberal	Dartmouth—Cole Harbour	2015	4th term
Shannon Miedema	Liberal	Halifax	2025	1st term
**Lena Diab**	Liberal	Halifax West	2021	2nd term
Kody Blois‡	Liberal	Kings—Hants	2019	3rd term
Braedon Clark	Liberal	Sackville—Bedford—Preston	2025	1st term
Jessica Fancy-Landry	Liberal	South Shore—St. Margaret's	2025	1st term
Mike Kelloway‡	Liberal	Sydney—Glace Bay	2019	3rd term

=== Ontario ===
Name	Party	Electoral district	First elected / previously elected	No. of terms
Jennifer McKelvie‡	Liberal	Ajax	2025	1st term
Cheryl Gallant	Conservative	Algonquin—Renfrew—Pembroke	2000	9th term
Costas Menegakis	Conservative	Aurora—Oak Ridges—Richmond Hill	2011, (Note: Richmond Hill) 2025	2nd term*
John Brassard	Conservative	Barrie South—Innisfil	2015	4th term
Doug Shipley	Conservative	Barrie—Springwater—Oro-Medonte	2019	3rd term
Chris Malette	Liberal	Bay of Quinte	2025	1st term
Nathaniel Erskine-Smith (Until July 7, 2026)	Liberal	Beaches—East York	2015	4th term
Tanveer Shahnawaz (From August 31, 2026)	Liberal	Beaches—East York	2026	1st term
Jamil Jivani	Conservative	Bowmanville—Oshawa North	2024	2nd term
Amandeep Sodhi	Liberal	Brampton Centre	2025	1st term
**Maninder Sidhu**	Liberal	Brampton East	2019	3rd term
**Ruby Sahota**	Liberal	Brampton North—Caledon	2015	4th term
Sonia Sidhu	Liberal	Brampton South	2015	4th term
Amarjeet Gill	Conservative	Brampton West	2025	1st term
**Shafqat Ali**	Liberal	Brampton—Chinguacousy Park	2021	2nd term
Larry Brock (Until September 18, 2026)	Conservative	Brantford—Brant South—Six Nations	2021	2nd term
Alex Ruff	Conservative	Bruce—Grey—Owen Sound	2019	3rd term
Karina Gould	Liberal	Burlington	2015	4th term
**Adam van Koeverden**	Liberal	Burlington North—Milton West	2019	3rd term
Connie Cody	Conservative	Cambridge	2025	1st term
Bruce Fanjoy	Liberal	Carleton	2025	1st term
Dave Epp	Conservative	Chatham-Kent—Leamington	2019	3rd term
Julie Dzerowicz	Liberal	Davenport	2015	4th term
Maggie Chi‡	Liberal	Don Valley North	2025	1st term
Rob Oliphant‡	Liberal	Don Valley West	2008, 2015	5th term*
Kyle Seeback	Conservative	Dufferin—Caledon	2011, (Note: Brampton West) 2019	4th term*
Vince Gasparro‡	Liberal	Eglinton—Lawrence	2025	1st term
Andrew Lawton	Conservative	Elgin—St. Thomas—London South	2025	1st term
Chris Lewis	Conservative	Essex	2019	3rd term
Yvan Baker	Liberal	Etobicoke Centre	2019	3rd term
**John Zerucelli**	Liberal	Etobicoke North	2025	1st term
James Maloney	Liberal	Etobicoke—Lakeshore	2015	4th term
Dan Muys	Conservative	Flamborough—Glanbrook—Brant North	2021	2nd term
Dominique O'Rourke	Liberal	Guelph	2025	1st term
Leslyn Lewis	Conservative	Haldimand—Norfolk	2021	2nd term
Jamie Schmale	Conservative	Haliburton—Kawartha Lakes	2015	4th term
Aslam Rana	Liberal	Hamilton Centre	2025	1st term
Ned Kuruc	Conservative	Hamilton East—Stoney Creek	2025	1st term
Lisa Hepfner	Liberal	Hamilton Mountain	2021	2nd term
John-Paul Danko	Liberal	Hamilton West—Ancaster—Dundas	2025	1st term
Shelby Kramp-Neuman	Conservative	Hastings—Lennox and Addington—Tyendinaga	2021	2nd term
Judy Sgro	Liberal	Humber River—Black Creek	1999	10th term
Ben Lobb	Conservative	Huron—Bruce	2008	6th term
Jenna Sudds‡	Liberal	Kanata	2021	2nd term
Gaétan Malette	Conservative	Kapuskasing—Timmins—Mushkegowuk	2025	1st term
Eric Melillo	Conservative	Kenora—Kiiwetinoong	2019	3rd term
Anna Roberts	Conservative	King—Vaughan	2021	2nd term
Mark Gerretsen	Liberal	Kingston and the Islands	2015	4th term
Kelly DeRidder	Conservative	Kitchener Centre	2025	1st term
Matt Strauss	Conservative	Kitchener South—Hespeler	2025	1st term
Tim Louis‡	Liberal	Kitchener—Conestoga	2019	3rd term
Scott Reid	Conservative	Lanark—Frontenac	2000	9th term
Michael Barrett	Conservative	Leeds—Grenville—Thousand Islands—Rideau Lakes	2018	4th term
Kurt Holman	Conservative	London—Fanshawe	2025	1st term
Peter Fragiskatos‡	Liberal	London North Centre	2015	4th term
Arielle Kayabaga	Liberal	London West	2019	3rd term
Helena Jaczek	Liberal	Markham—Stouffville	2019	3rd term
**Tim Hodgson**	Liberal	Markham—Thornhill	2025	1st term
Michael Ma	Conservative (Note: Ma was originally elected as a Conservative but crossed the floor to join the Liberals on December 11, 2025)	Markham—Unionville	2025	1st term
Michael Ma	Liberal	Markham—Unionville	2025	1st term
Lianne Rood	Conservative	Middlesex—London	2019	3rd term
Kristina Tesser Derksen	Liberal	Milton East—Halton Hills South	2025	1st term
Fares Al Soud	Liberal	Mississauga Centre	2025	1st term
Peter Fonseca	Liberal	Mississauga East—Cooksville	2015	4th term
Iqra Khalid	Liberal	Mississauga—Erin Mills	2015	4th term
Charles Sousa	Liberal	Mississauga—Lakeshore	2022	2nd term
Iqwinder Singh Gaheer	Liberal	Mississauga—Malton	2019	3rd term
**Rechie Valdez**	Liberal	Mississauga—Streetsville	2021	2nd term
**Mark Carney**	Liberal	Nepean	2025	1st term
Sandra Cobena	Conservative	Newmarket—Aurora	2025	1st term
Scot Davidson	Conservative	New Tecumseth—Gwillimbury	2019	4th term
Tony Baldinelli	Conservative	Niagara Falls—Niagara-on-the-Lake	2019	3rd term
Fred Davies	Conservative	Niagara South	2025	1st term
Dean Allison	Conservative	Niagara West	2004	8th term
Pauline Rochefort‡	Liberal	Nipissing—Timiskaming	2025	1st term
Philip Lawrence	Conservative	Northumberland—Clarke	2019	3rd term
**Anita Anand**	Liberal	Oakville East	2019	3rd term
Sima Acan	Liberal	Oakville West	2025	1st term
Marie-France Lalonde	Liberal	Orléans	2019	3rd term
Rhonda Kirkland	Conservative	Oshawa	2025	1st term
Yasir Naqvi‡	Liberal	Ottawa Centre	2021	2nd term
**David McGuinty**	Liberal	Ottawa South	2004	8th term
Anita Vandenbeld	Liberal	Ottawa West—Nepean	2015	4th term
Mona Fortier‡	Liberal	Ottawa—Vanier—Gloucester	2017	4th term
Arpan Khanna	Conservative	Oxford	2023	2nd term
Scott Aitchison	Conservative	Parry Sound—Muskoka	2019	3rd term
John Nater	Conservative	Perth—Wellington	2015	4th term
Emma Harrison	Liberal	Peterborough	2025	1st term
Juanita Nathan	Liberal	Pickering—Brooklin	2025	1st term
Giovanna Mingarelli	Liberal	Prescott—Russell—Cumberland	2025	1st term
Vincent Ho	Conservative	Richmond Hill South	2025	1st term
Marilyn Gladu	Conservative (Note: Gladu was originally elected as a Conservative but crossed the floor to join the Liberals on April 8, 2026)	Sarnia—Lambton—Bkejwanong	2015	4th term
Marilyn Gladu	Liberal	Sarnia—Lambton—Bkejwanong	2015	4th term
Terry Sheehan	Liberal	Sault Ste. Marie—Algoma	2015	4th term
Salma Zahid	Liberal	Scarborough Centre—Don Valley East	2015	4th term
Shaun Chen (Until August 15, 2026)	Liberal	Scarborough North	2015	4th term
Bill Blair (Until February 2, 2026)	Liberal	Scarborough Southwest	2015	4th term
Doly Begum (From April 13, 2026)	Liberal	Scarborough Southwest	2026	1st term
Jean Yip	Liberal	Scarborough—Agincourt	2017	4th term
**Gary Anandasangaree**	Liberal	Scarborough—Guildwood—Rouge Park	2015	4th term
Michael Coteau	Liberal	Scarborough—Woburn	2021	2nd term
Adam Chambers	Conservative	Simcoe North	2021	2nd term
Terry Dowdall	Conservative	Simcoe—Grey	2019	3rd term
Chi Nguyen	Liberal	Spadina—Harbourfront	2025	1st term
Chris Bittle	Liberal	St. Catharines	2015	4th term
Eric Duncan	Conservative	Stormont—Dundas—Glengarry	2019	3rd term
Viviane Lapointe	Liberal	Sudbury	2021	2nd term
Marc Serré	Liberal	Sudbury East—Manitoulin—Nickel Belt	2015	4th term
Karim Bardeesy‡	Liberal	Taiaiako'n—Parkdale—High Park	2025	1st term
Melissa Lantsman	Conservative	Thornhill	2021	2nd term
Marcus Powlowski	Liberal	Thunder Bay—Rainy River	2019	3rd term
**Patty Hajdu**	Liberal	Thunder Bay—Superior North	2015	4th term
**Evan Solomon**	Liberal	Toronto Centre	2025	1st term
**Julie Dabrusin**	Liberal	Toronto—Danforth	2015	4th term
Leslie Church‡	Liberal	Toronto—St. Paul's	2025	1st term
**Chrystia Freeland**‡ (Until January 9, 2026)	Liberal	University—Rosedale	2013	5th term
Danielle Martin (From April 13, 2026)	Liberal	University—Rosedale	2026	1st term
Michael Guglielmin	Conservative	Vaughan—Woodbridge	2025	1st term
Bardish Chagger	Liberal	Waterloo	2015	4th term
Michael Chong	Conservative	Wellington—Halton Hills North	2004	8th term
Ryan Turnbull‡	Liberal	Whitby	2019	3rd term
Ali Ehsassi‡	Liberal	Willowdale	2015	4th term
Kathy Borrelli	Conservative	Windsor—Tecumseh—Lakeshore	2025	1st term
Harb Gill	Conservative	Windsor West	2025	1st term
Roman Baber	Conservative	York Centre	2025	1st term
Jacob Mantle	Conservative	York—Durham	2025	1st term
Ahmed Hussen	Liberal	York South—Weston—Etobicoke	2015	4th term

=== Prince Edward Island ===
Name	Party	Electoral district	First elected / previously elected	No. of terms
Kent MacDonald	Liberal	Cardigan	2025	1st term
Sean Casey‡	Liberal	Charlottetown	2011	5th term
Bobby Morrissey	Liberal	Egmont	2015	4th term
**Heath MacDonald**	Liberal	Malpeque	2021	2nd term

=== Quebec ===
Name	Party	Electoral district	First elected / previously elected	No. of terms
**Mandy Gull-Masty**	Liberal	Abitibi—Baie-James—Nunavik—Eeyou	2025	1st term
Sébastien Lemire	Bloc Québécois	Abitibi—Témiscamingue	2019	3rd term
**Mélanie Joly**	Liberal	Ahuntsic-Cartierville	2015	4th term
Angelo Iacono	Liberal	Alfred-Pellan	2015	4th term
Stéphane Lauzon	Liberal	Argenteuil—La Petite-Nation	2015	4th term
Jason Groleau	Conservative	Beauce	2025	1st term
Claude DeBellefeuille	Bloc Québécois	Beauharnois—Salaberry—Soulanges—Huntingdon	2006, 2019	5th term*
Steeve Lavoie	Liberal	Beauport—Limoilou	2025	1st term
Louis Plamondon	Bloc Québécois	Bécancour—Nicolet—Saurel—Alnôbak	1984 (Note: First elected as a Progressive Conservative)	13th term
Dominique Vien	Conservative	Bellechasse—Les Etchemins—Lévis	2021	2nd term
Yves-François Blanchet	Bloc Québécois	Belœil—Chambly	2019	3rd term
Yves Perron	Bloc Québécois	Berthier—Maskinongé	2019	3rd term
Abdelhaq Sari	Liberal	Bourassa	2025	1st term
Louis Villeneuve	Liberal	Brome—Missisquoi	2025	1st term
Alexandra Mendès	Liberal	Brossard—Saint-Lambert	2008, 2015	5th term*
Pierre Paul-Hus	Conservative	Charlesbourg—Haute-Saint-Charles	2015	4th term
**Nathalie Provost**	Liberal	Châteauguay—Les Jardins-de-Napierville	2025	1st term
Richard Martel (Until July 9, 2026)	Conservative	Chicoutimi—Le Fjord	2018	4th term
Daniel Gobeil‡ (From August 31, 2026)	Liberal	Chicoutimi—Le Fjord	2026	1st term
Marianne Dandurand	Liberal	Compton—Stanstead	2025	1st term
Bernard Généreux	Conservative	Côte-du-Sud—Rivière-du-Loup—Kataskomiq—Témiscouata	2009, 2015	5th term*
Marilène Gill	Bloc Québécois	Côte-Nord—Kawawachikamach—Nitassinan	2015	4th term
Anju Dhillon	Liberal	Dorval—Lachine—LaSalle	2015	4th term
Martin Champoux	Bloc Québécois	Drummond	2019	3rd term
Alexis Deschênes	Bloc Québécois	Gaspésie—Les Îles-de-la-Madeleine—Listuguj	2025	1st term
**Steven MacKinnon**	Liberal	Gatineau	2015	4th term
Marie-Gabrielle Ménard‡	Liberal	Hochelaga—Rosemont-Est	2025	1st term
Éric St-Pierre	Liberal	Honoré-Mercier	2025	1st term
Greg Fergus	Liberal	Hull—Aylmer	2015	4th term
Gabriel Ste-Marie	Bloc Québécois	Joliette—Manawan	2015	4th term
Mario Simard	Bloc Québécois	Jonquière	2019	3rd term
Mario Beaulieu	Bloc Québécois	La Pointe-de-l'Île	2015	4th term
Jacques Ramsay‡	Liberal	La Prairie—Atateken	2025	1st term
Alexis Brunelle-Duceppe	Bloc Québécois	Lac-Saint-Jean	2019	3rd term
Francis Scarpaleggia†	Liberal	Lac-Saint-Louis	2004	8th term
Claude Guay‡	Liberal	LaSalle—Émard—Verdun	2025	1st term
Marie-Hélène Gaudreau	Bloc Québécois	Laurentides—Labelle	2019	3rd term
**Steven Guilbeault** (Until August 28, 2026)	Liberal	Laurier—Sainte-Marie	2019	3rd term
Fayçal El-Khoury	Liberal	Laval—Les Îles	2015	4th term
Tim Watchorn	Liberal	Les Pays-d'en-Haut	2025	1st term
Jacques Gourde	Conservative	Lévis—Lotbinière	2006	7th term
Sherry Romanado‡	Liberal	Longueuil—Charles-LeMoyne	2015	4th term
Natilien Joseph	Liberal	Longueuil—Saint-Hubert	2025	1st term
**Joël Lightbound**	Liberal	Louis-Hébert	2015	4th term
Gérard Deltell	Conservative	Louis-Saint-Laurent—Akiawenhrahk	2015	4th term
Carlos Leitão‡	Liberal	Marc-Aurèle-Fortin	2025	1st term
Luc Berthold	Conservative	Mégantic—L'Érable—Lotbinière	2015	4th term
Jean-Denis Garon	Bloc Québécois	Mirabel	2021	2nd term
Bienvenu-Olivier Ntumba	Liberal	Mont-Saint-Bruno—L'Acadie	2025	1st term
Luc Thériault	Bloc Québécois	Montcalm	2015	4th term
Gabriel Hardy	Conservative	Montmorency—Charlevoix	2025	1st term
Anthony Housefather‡	Liberal	Mount Royal	2015	4th term
**Anna Gainey**	Liberal	Notre-Dame-de-Grâce—Westmount	2023	2nd term
Rachel Bendayan‡	Liberal	Outremont	2019	4th term
**Marjorie Michel**	Liberal	Papineau	2025	1st term
Xavier Barsalou-Duval	Bloc Québécois	Pierre-Boucher—Les Patriotes—Verchères	2015	4th term
Sameer Zuberi	Liberal	Pierrefonds—Dollard	2019	3rd term
Sophie Chatel‡	Liberal	Pontiac—Kitigan Zibi	2021	2nd term
Joël Godin	Conservative	Portneuf—Jacques-Cartier	2015	4th term
Jean-Yves Duclos	Liberal	Québec Centre	2015	4th term
Patrick Bonin	Bloc Québécois	Repentigny	2025	1st term
Éric Lefebvre	Conservative	Richmond—Arthabaska	2025	1st term
Maxime Blanchette-Joncas	Bloc Québécois	Rimouski—La Matapédia	2019	3rd term
Linda Lapointe	Liberal	Rivière-des-Mille-Îles	2015, 2025	2nd term*
Rhéal Fortin	Bloc Québécois	Rivière-du-Nord	2015	4th term
Alexandre Boulerice (Until August 26, 2026)	NDP (Note: Boulerice was originally elected as a New Democrat but resigned from caucus on April 27, 2026)	Rosemont—La Petite-Patrie	2011	5th term
Alexandre Boulerice (Until August 26, 2026)	Independent	Rosemont—La Petite-Patrie	2011	5th term
Simon-Pierre Savard-Tremblay (Until June 19, 2026)	Bloc Québécois (Note: Savard-Tremblay was originally elected as a member of the Bloc Québécois but resigned from caucus on May 28, 2026)	Saint-Hyacinthe—Bagot—Acton	2019	3rd term
Simon-Pierre Savard-Tremblay (Until June 19, 2026)	Independent	Saint-Hyacinthe—Bagot—Acton	2019	3rd term
Christine Normandin	Bloc Québécois	Saint-Jean	2019	3rd term
Emmanuella Lambropoulos	Liberal	Saint-Laurent	2017	4th term
Patricia Lattanzio	Liberal	Saint-Léonard—Saint-Michel	2019	3rd term
**François-Philippe Champagne**	Liberal	Saint-Maurice—Champlain	2015	4th term
Andréanne Larouche	Bloc Québécois	Shefford	2025	1st term
Élisabeth Brière	Liberal	Sherbrooke	2019	3rd term
Tatiana Auguste	Liberal	Terrebonne	2025	1st term
Madeleine Chenette‡	Liberal	Thérèse-De Blainville	2025	1st term
Caroline Desrochers‡	Liberal	Trois-Rivières	2025	1st term
Peter Schiefke	Liberal	Vaudreuil	2015	4th term
**Marc Miller**	Liberal	Ville-Marie—Le Sud-Ouest—Île-des-Soeurs	2015	4th term
Annie Koutrakis‡	Liberal	Vimy	2019	3rd term

=== Saskatchewan ===
Name	Party	Electoral district	First elected / previously elected	No. of terms
Rosemarie Falk	Conservative	Battlefords—Lloydminster—Meadow Lake	2017	4th term
Kelly Block	Conservative	Carlton Trail—Eagle Creek	2008	6th term
**Buckley Belanger**	Liberal	Desnethé—Missinippi—Churchill River	2025	1st term
Fraser Tolmie	Conservative	Moose Jaw—Lake Centre—Lanigan	2021	2nd term
Randy Hoback	Conservative	Prince Albert	2008	6th term
Warren Steinley	Conservative	Regina—Lewvan	2019	3rd term
Andrew Scheer (Note: Leader of the Official Opposition From May 6, 2025 to August 18, 2025.)	Conservative	Regina—Qu'Appelle	2004	8th term
Michael Kram	Conservative	Regina—Wascana	2019	3rd term
Kevin Waugh	Conservative	Saskatoon South	2015	4th term
Brad Redekopp	Conservative	Saskatoon West	2019	3rd term
Corey Tochor	Conservative	Saskatoon—University	2019	3rd term
Steven Bonk	Conservative	Souris—Moose Mountain	2025	1st term
Jeremy Patzer	Conservative	Swift Current—Grasslands—Kindersley	2019	3rd term
Cathay Wagantall (Until August 31, 2026)	Conservative	Yorkton—Melville	2015	4th term

=== Territories ===
Name	Party	Electoral district	First elected / previously elected	No. of terms
**Rebecca Alty**	Liberal	Northwest Territories	2025	1st term
Lori Idlout	NDP (Note: Idlout was originally elected as a New Democrat but crossed the floor to join the Liberals on March 10, 2026)	Nunavut	2021	2nd term
Lori Idlout	Liberal	Nunavut	2021	2nd term
Brendan Hanley‡	Liberal	Yukon	2021	2nd term

== Changes since the 2025 election ==
=== Membership changes ===
Changes in seats held (2025–present)
Seat	Before			Change				
Seat	Date	Member	Party	Reason	Date	Member	Party	Ref(s)
Battle River—Crowfoot	June 17, 2025	Damien Kurek	█ Conservative	Resigned from parliament to allow Conservative Party leader Pierre Poilievre to run for the seat	August 18, 2025	Pierre Poilievre	█ Conservative	
Acadie—Annapolis	November 4, 2025	Chris d'Entremont	█ Conservative	Resigned from caucus to join the Liberal Party caucus			█ Liberal	
Markham—Unionville	December 11, 2025	Michael Ma	█ Conservative	Resigned from caucus to join the Liberal Party caucus			█ Liberal	
University—Rosedale	January 9, 2026	Chrystia Freeland	█ Liberal	Resigned from parliament to become an economic advisor for Ukraine	April 13, 2026	Danielle Martin	█ Liberal	
Scarborough Southwest	February 2, 2026	Bill Blair	█ Liberal	Resigned from parliament to become the Canadian High Commissioner to the United Kingdom	April 13, 2026	Doly Begum	█ Liberal	
Terrebonne	February 13, 2026	Tatiana Auguste	█ Liberal	2025 result annulled by the Supreme Court	April 13, 2026	Tatiana Auguste	█ Liberal	
Edmonton Riverbend	February 18, 2026	Matt Jeneroux	█ Conservative	Resigned from caucus to join the Liberal Party caucus			█ Liberal	
Nunavut	March 10, 2026	Lori Idlout	█ New Democratic	Resigned from caucus to join the Liberal Party caucus			█ Liberal	
Sarnia—Lambton—Bkejwanong	April 8, 2026	Marilyn Gladu	█ Conservative	Resigned from caucus to join the Liberal Party caucus			█ Liberal	
Rosemont—La Petite-Patrie	April 27, 2026	Alexandre Boulerice	█ New Democratic	Resigned from caucus in preparation to run in the 2026 Quebec general election in Gouin for Quebec solidaire			█ Independent	
Saint-Hyacinthe—Bagot—Acton	May 28, 2026	Simon-Pierre Savard-Tremblay	█ Bloc Québécois	Resigned from caucus in preparation to run in the 2026 Quebec general election in Saint-Hyacinthe for Parti Québécois			█ Independent	
Saint-Hyacinthe—Bagot—Acton	June 19, 2026	Simon-Pierre Savard-Tremblay	█ Independent	Resigned from parliament to run in the 2026 Quebec general election in Saint-Hyacinthe for Parti Québécois	December 7, 2026		█ Vacant	
North Vancouver—Capilano	June 19, 2026	Jonathan Wilkinson	█ Liberal	Resigned from parliament to take up the post of Canadian Ambassador to the European Union.	August 31, 2026	Braeden Caley	█ Liberal	
Chicoutimi—Le Fjord	July 7, 2026	Richard Martel	█ Conservative	Resigned from caucus to accept an appointment to the Senate as an independent.			█ Independent	
Chicoutimi—Le Fjord	July 7, 2026	Richard Martel	█ Independent	Resigned as a member of parliament upon appointment to the Senate.	August 31, 2026	Daniel Gobeil	█ Liberal	
Beaches—East York	July 7, 2026	Nate Erskine-Smith	█ Liberal	Resigned from parliament to run in the 2026 Toronto municipal election for the equivalent ward.	August 31, 2026	Tanveer Shahnawaz	█ Liberal	
Scarborough North	August 15, 2026	Shaun Chen	█ Liberal	Resigned from parliament due to health concerns following a car accident.	December 7, 2026		█ Vacant	
Rosemont—La Petite-Patrie	August 26, 2026	Alexandre Boulerice	█ Independent	Resigned from parliament to run in the 2026 Quebec general election in Gouin for Quebec solidaire	December 7, 2026		█ Vacant	
Laurier—Sainte-Marie	August 28, 2026	Steven Guilbeault	█ Liberal	Resigned from parliament.	December 7, 2026		█ Vacant	
Yorkton—Melville	August 31, 2026	Cathay Wagantall	█ Conservative	Resigned from parliament.	December 7, 2026		█ Vacant	
Brantford—Brant South	September 18, 2026	Larry Brock	█ Conservative	Resigned from parliament to work for the Crown Attorney's office in Brantford.	December 7, 2026		█ Vacant	

=== Standings ===
Number of members per party by date	2025					2026															
Number of members per party by date	Apr 28	Jun 17	Aug 18	Nov 4	Dec 11	Jan 9	Feb 2	Feb 13	Feb 18	Mar 10	Apr 8	Apr 13	Apr 27	May 28	Jun 19	Jul 7	Aug 15	Aug 25	Aug 28	Aug 31	Sep 18
Liberal	169			170	171	170	169	168	169	170	171	174			173	172	171		170	173	
Conservative	144	143	144	143	142				141		140					139				138	137
Bloc Québécois	22													21							
New Democratic	7									6			5								
Green	1																				
Independent	0												1	2	1			0			
Total members	343	342	343			342	341	340				343			341	339	338	337	336	338	337
Government majority	–5	–4	–5	–3	–1	–2	–3	–4	–2	0	+2	+5					+4	+5	+4	+8	+9
Vacant	0	1	0			1	2	3				0			2	4	5	6	7	5	6

=== Riding name changes ===
Since the 2025 election, the following ridings have had their names changed, upon the request of the various incumbent MPs:

An Act to change the names of certain electoral districts, 2026
Prov	Name at 2025 election	Changed to
NL	Cape Spear	Cape Spear—Mount Pearl—Paradise
NL	Central Newfoundland	Coast of Bays—Central—Notre Dame
NL	Terra Nova—The Peninsulas	The Eastern Peninsulas
NS	Halifax West	Halifax West—Peggy’s Cove
NB	Saint John—St. Croix	New Brunswick Southwest
QC	Argenteuil—La Petite-Nation	Argenteuil—Papineau—Des Collines
QC	Beauharnois—Salaberry—Soulanges—Huntingdon	Vallée-du-Haut-Saint-Laurent
QC	Jonquière	Jonquière—Hébertville—Pays-des-Bleuets
QC	Longueuil—Charles-LeMoyne	Longueuil—Charles-LeMoyne—Greenfield Park
QC	Portneuf—Jacques-Cartier	Saint-Augustin—Portneuf—Jacques-Cartier
QC	Richmond—Arthabaska	Richmond—Arthabaska—des-Sources
QC	Rimouski—La Matapédia	Rimouski-Neigette—Mitis—Matapédia—Les Basques
ON	Brantford—Brant South—Six Nations	Brantford—Brant South
ON	New Tecumseth—Gwillimbury	York—South Simcoe
ON	York Centre	North York
SK	Saskatoon—University	Saskatoon East
BC	Cariboo—Prince George	Cariboo—Prince George—Omineca
