= Hagey =

Hagey is a surname. Notable people with the surname include:

- Chico Hagey, American tennis player
- Gerald Hagey, Canadian businessman and academic
- Joseph B. Hagey, Canadian bishop
- Louis Hagey, Canadian politician
- Susan Hagey, American tennis player
