= 2026 Brantford—Brant South federal by-election =

Canadian By-election

- December 7, 2026

Riding of Brantford—Brant South
	CPC	LPC
Candidate	Kevin Davis	Joy O'Donnell
Party	Conservative	Liberal
Last election	52.44%	41.09%
	NDP	Ind
Candidate	Brad Ward	Dave Carrol
Party	New Democratic	Independent
Last election	3.66%	N/A
Incumbent MP
Vacant (Note: Seat was last held by Larry Brock (Conservative). Brock resigned as an MP on September 18, 2026.)

A by-election will be held on December 7, 2026, to elect a member of Parliament (MP) to represent the Ontario federal constituency of Brantford—Brant South in the House of Commons of Canada for the remainder of the 45th Canadian Parliament.

The by-election follows the resignation of incumbent Conservative MP Larry Brock on September 18, 2026.

On September 16, 2026, just two days before his resignation, the riding's name was changed to Brantford—Brant South (French: Brantford—Brant-Sud) from Brantford—Brant South—Six Nations as part of Bill C-25 of the 45th Canadian Parliament.

The latest date the by-election could have been be held is May 3, 2027. On November 1, 2026, the election was called for December 7.

== Candidates ==
=== Conservatives ===
Brantford mayor Kevin Davis was appointed the Conservative candidate on September 20, 2026 by Pierre Polievre.

Dave Carrol, lead pastor at Freedom House in Brantford, and Joshua Wall, a real estate agent and former Brantford City Councillor for Ward 5, were seeking the nomination for the Conservatives. Carrol later announced he would run as an independent.

=== Liberals ===
On October 31, 2026, the Liberals announced that Joy O'Donnell, a certified financial planner and the Liberal candidate in the 2025 federal election, would be the candidate.

=== NDP ===
The NDP riding association nominated as its candidate Brad Ward, the Member of Provincial Parliament (MPP) for Brantford from 1990 to 1995. Andy Straisfeld, president of MRE Canada and MEA Health Corporation also sought the nomination.

=== Green ===
The Green candidate is Kathryn Kissinger, announced by the party on November 6.

=== Independent ===
On October 28, 2026, Dave Carrol, who sought the nomination for the Conservatives and was endorsed for said nomination by the outgoing Brantford—Brant South MP Larry Brock, announced that he would run as an independent. His independent candidacy was endorsed by both the former Brantford—Brant MP Phil McColeman and Haldimand—Norfolk MPP Bobbi Ann Brady.

== Result ==
Canadian federal by-election, December 7, 2026: Brantford—Brant South Resignation of Larry Brock
The by-election will be held on December 7, 2026.
Party	Candidate	Votes	%	±%	Expenditures
Conservative	Kevin Davis				
Liberal	Joy O'Donnell				
New Democratic	Brad Ward				
Green	Kathryn Kissinger				
People's	TBD				
Independent	Dave Carrol				
Total valid votes/expense limit			–		
Total rejected ballots					
Turnout					
Eligible voters					
Source: Elections Canada

== Previous result ==
2025 Canadian federal election: Brantford—Brant South—Six Nations
Party	Candidate	Votes	%	±%	Expenditures
Conservative	Larry Brock	34,501	52.44	+12.36	$127,957.24
Liberal	Joy O'Donnell	27,032	41.09	+13.36	$124,026.65
New Democratic	Anne Gajerski-Cauley	2,410	3.66	–16.63	$1,529.63
Green	Karleigh Csordas	1,110	1.69	–0.95	$14,780.53
People's	Nicholas Xenos	392	0.60	–8.18	$3,633.49
Independent	Mike Clancy	148	0.22	N/A	$0.00
Independent	Leslie Bory	120	0.18	N/A	$839.52
Independent	Clo Marie	80	0.12	N/A	$0.00
Total valid votes/expense limit		65,793	99.46	–	$147,446.43
Total rejected ballots		357	0.54		
Turnout		66,150	64.60		
Eligible voters		102,397			
Conservative hold		Swing		–0.50	
Source: Elections Canada
