= Kevin Davis (politician) =

Canadian former politician

50th Mayor of Brantford
- In office December 3, 2018 – November 15, 2026
- Preceded by: Chris Friel
- Succeeded by: Richard Carpenter

Brantford City Councillor for Ward 2
- In office 1985–1991 Serving with Brad Ward
- Preceded by: Bob Lancaster; Peter Hexamer
- Succeeded by: John Sless; Bob Lancaster
- Constituency: Ward 2

Personal details
- Born: Donald Kevin Davis
- Party: Conservative
- Other political affiliations: Progressive Conservative
- Spouse: Lisa Davis
- Children: 3
- Education: University of Calgary; Queen's University
- Profession: Politician; lawyer

Donald Kevin Davis is a Canadian politician and lawyer who served as the 50th mayor of Brantford from 2018 to 2026.

== Early life and career ==
Davis was educated at the University of Calgary where he earned a bachelor's degree in economics and political science and at Queen's University where he earned a law degree. After graduating, he became a lawyer at Waterous Holden Amey Hitchon LLP in Brantford, and he became a partner there in 1983. He worked at the firm until his election as mayor in 2018.

Davis served as Ward 2 alderman from 1985 to 1991. He was first elected to Brantford City Council in 1985 and was returned without opposition in 1988; he did not seek re-election in 1991. He served on the board of Brantford's Progressive Conservative Party of Ontario association. Many expected that he would run for the party in the 2007 provincial election, but he declined.

Prior to being elected as mayor, he served as Governor of Mohawk College, the president of the Brantford-Brant Chamber of Commerce, the Brantford Aquatic Club, the Brantford Boys and Girls Club, and was chairman of the Brantford Economic Development Board, John Noble Home and the Brant United Way campaign.

== Mayoralty ==
Davis was elected as mayor of Brantford in the 2018 Brantford municipal election, defeating long-time incumbent mayor Chris Friel by over 5,600 votes. Friel blamed the loss on being out-spent by Davis. Upon becoming mayor, Davis indicated the development of the "boundary lands", territory annexed from the surrounding County of Brant, was his foremost priority. His other priorities included tackling the city's budget, the operation of the Brant County SPCA, improving safety downtown and re-organizing the homeless shelter system.

One of the major issues Davis has had to deal with as mayor is the ongoing opioid epidemic in the city. In 2019, Davis came out in support of creating a supervised injection site in the city to deal with the epidemic. In addition to the opioid epidemic, he has also had to deal with homelessness and gun violence in the community.

In 2019, Davis announced he had stage 1 renal cell carcinoma, and underwent surgery to get a kidney removed. Also in 2019, he was appointed to the board of directors of the Association of Municipalities of Ontario, Large Urban Caucus.

== Controversies ==
=== Arrowdale Golf Course sale ===
During his term as mayor, Davis faced controversy for allegedly trying to "ram" through city council a decision to sell the Arrowdale Golf Course, according to leaked emails. He was criticized for not being transparent about the plan that would involve building affordable housing on the site. City council approved the sale of the club in 2020. The decision was later upheld in court: in January 2021 the Ontario Divisional Court dismissed a judicial review application opposing the sale, and in April 2021 the Court of Appeal denied leave to appeal. In October 2021, a small group of protesters, including members of Six Nations, briefly occupied the site, with the City characterizing the action as unlawful and referring the matter to police. The City finalized the land sale in 2022 and has stated that proceeds are dedicated to affordable housing and that a 17-acre community park will be retained on the site.

=== 2024 resignation announcement ===
On July 10, 2024, Davis announced he was planning on resigning as mayor effective at the end of the month, to become a member of the Licence Appeal Tribunal, a provincial body that adjudicates licensing activities, and also citing wanting to spend more time with his family and harassment as reasons for his resignation. Attention quickly turned to the financial and civic impact: a by-election was estimated at over $600,000 and would not occur until January 2025, leaving the city without an elected mayor for several months. On July 25, Davis announced that he had rejected the appointment and would continue to serve as mayor of the city until the end of his term, saying that he wanted to avoid a costly by-election.

=== Brantford–Brant amalgamation debate ===
In January 2025, Davis used his strong-mayor powers to direct staff to commission an independent study on the potential amalgamation of the City of Brantford and the surrounding County of Brant, with a report due by the end of 2025. The proposal drew immediate and firm opposition from County of Brant Mayor David Bailey, who stated the county was “unequivocally opposed” and criticized the approach as “unproductive and misguided.” This created public debate surrounding what Brant County residents saw as a forced amalgamation.

== Federal politics ==
On September 20, 2026, it was announced that Davis would be the Conservative Party of Canada candidate in the upcoming Brantford—Brant South federal by-election.. Davis was appointed by the leader of the Conservative Party of Canada, Pierre Poilievre, bypassing the traditional nomination process. This lead to Dave Carrol, then president of the Brantford PC EDA and candidate in the nomination process, to run as an independent.

== Electoral record ==
Canadian federal by-election, December 7, 2026: Brantford—Brant South Resignation of Larry Brock
The by-election will be held on December 7, 2026.
Party	Candidate	Votes	%	±%	Expenditures
Conservative	Kevin Davis				
Liberal	Joy O'Donnell				
New Democratic	Brad Ward				
Green	Kathryn Kissinger				
People's	Anthony Tarrant				
Christian Heritage	Dirk Byers				
Independent	Leslie Bory				
Independent	Dave Carrol				
Independent	Mike Clancy				
Total valid votes/expense limit			–		
Total rejected ballots					
Turnout					
Eligible voters					
Source: Elections Canada

2022 Brantford mayoral election
Mayoral Candidate	Vote	%
Kevin Davis (X)	9,220	45.95
Dave Wrobel	9,012	44.91
Ryan Smith	1,491	7.43
John Turmel	343	1.71

2018 Brantford mayoral election
Mayoral Candidate	Vote	%
Kevin Davis	12,867	52.93
Chris Friel (X)	7,200	29.62
Dave Wrobel	3,345	13.76
Barbara Berardi	532	2.19
Michael Issa	186	0.77
John Turmel	128	0.53
Wayne Maw	50	0.21

1988 Brantford municipal election: Councillor, Ward Two (two members elected)
Candidate	Votes	%
(x)Kevin Davis	acclaimed	-
(x)Brad Ward	acclaimed	-

1985 Brantford municipal election: Councillor, Ward Two (two members elected)
Candidate	Votes	%
Kevin Davis	2,483	32.28
Brad Ward	1,906	24.78
Vince Bucci	1,292	16.80
Tom Potter	974	12.66
Enid Green	648	8.43
Paul Mellor	388	5.04
Total valid votes	7,691	100
