= Ron Johnson (Canadian politician) =

Canadian political figure (born 1966)

Member of the Ontario Provincial Parliament for Brantford
- In office June 8, 1995 – June 3, 1999
- Preceded by: Brad Ward
- Succeeded by: Dave Levac

Personal details
- Born: November 18, 1966 (age 59) Brantford, Ontario, Canada
- Party: Progressive Conservative
- Occupation: Newspaper editor

Ron Wayne Johnson (born November 18, 1966) is a Canadian political figure who served as a member of the Legislative Assembly of Ontario from 1995 to 1999, representing the division of Brantford as a Progressive Conservative.

== Background ==
Johnson was born in Brantford, and was educated at the Brantford Collegiate Institute, Lambton College, McMaster University, and the Transport Canada Training Institution. Prior to his election, he was the editor of a weekly community newspaper called Brant News. During the 1993 federal election, he and other community newspaper representatives took part in a roundtable discussion with Prime Minister Kim Campbell.

== Provincial politics ==
Johnson was elected to the Ontario legislature in the 1995 provincial election, defeating former Liberal Member of Provincial Parliament (MPP) Dave Neumann. New Democratic Party incumbent Brad Ward finished third. The Progressive Conservatives won a majority government in this election under the leadership Mike Harris, and Johnson entered the legislature as a government backbencher. He lobbied in support of completing Highway 403 during his first year in office.

Johnson considered voting against the Harris government's Bill 152 in 1997. This bill transferred the cost of social services from the province to municipalities, and Johnson expressed concern that it could result in higher property taxes for Brantford residents. He later announced that he would likely support the bill due to its amendment, after a meeting with senior cabinet ministers.

Johnson did not play a major role in the legislature and was often criticized for his absences. A 1998 newspaper report described him as "among the worst attendees in the legislature," and other Progressive Conservative MPPs openly teased him for his record. He was dropped from all legislative committees in 1997, and his office was relocated to a basement corner. There was little surprise when he chose not to run in the 1999 provincial election.

The Brantford Expositor ran a scathing editorial about Johnson in June 1999, stating there was "no way [he] could win re-election because he simply had not done the job." The paper's editor accused Johnson of ignoring the concerns of his constituents and spending more time on golf courses than in the legislature, adding that it was "galling" to learn he would collect $39,000 in severance pay.

He supported Chris Stockwell's bid to lead the Ontario Progressive Conservatives in the party's 2002 leadership contest, which was called after Mike Harris's retirement. He later backed Frank Klees's bid to lead the party in 2004, and supported Tim Hudak in 2009.

== Federal politics ==
Johnson supported an alliance between the centre-right Progressive Conservative Party of Canada and the more right-wing Reform Party of Canada in the mid-1990s. He attended a 1996 meeting in Calgary that called for a formal alliance of the parties, and indicated that he contributed money to both parties in the 1997 federal election. He was the co-chair of a planned conference for Ontario's Young Progressive Conservatives (YPCs) in 1993, and in this capacity invited Reform Party leader Preston Manning to speak to the delegates. This idea was rejected by the YPC leadership, which postponed the conference and removed Johnson from his position.

== Later life ==
After standing down from the legislature, Johnson was hired as director corporate development for a pharmaceutical company in Toronto.

== Electoral record ==
1995 Ontario general election: Brantford
| Party | Candidate | Votes | % | ±% | Expenditures |
|---|---|---|---|---|---|
| Progressive Conservative | Ron Johnson | 13,745 | 41.01 | +32.55 | $36,072 |
| Liberal | Dave Neumann | 10,418 | 31.08 | −6.33 | $25,897 |
| New Democratic | Brad Ward | 8,165 | 24.36 | −24.27 | $41,119 |
| Family Coalition | Paul Vandervet | 762 | 2.27 | −1.60 | $776 |
| Green | William Darfler | 430 | 1.28 | +0.08 | $622 |
| Total valid votes | | 33,520 | 100.00 | | |
| Rejected, unmarked and declined ballots | | 288 | | | |
| Turnout | | 33,808 | 59.90 | −6.81 | |
| Electors on the lists | | 56,445 | | | |
