= 1988 Brantford municipal election =

The 1988 Brantford municipal election was held on November 14, 1988, to elect a mayor, councillors, and school trustees in Brantford, Ontario, Canada. Elections were also held in the rural and small-town communities around the city.

== Results ==
1988 Brantford municipal election: Mayor
Candidate	Votes	%
(x)Karen George	17,611	65.09
Pat Luciani	7,859	29.05
Roy Jones	945	3.49
William Stewart	640	2.37
Total valid votes	27,055	100.00

1988 Brantford municipal election: Councillor, Ward Two (two members elected)
Candidate	Votes	%
(x)Kevin Davis	acclaimed	-
(x)Brad Ward	acclaimed	-

- Kevin Davis has a Bachelor of Arts (Honours) degree from the University of Calgary and a Bachelor of Laws degree from Queen's University. He is a lawyer in Brantford and has chaired both the Brantford Regional Chamber of Commerce and the city's economic development board. Davis was first elected to Brantford City Council in 1985 and was returned without opposition in 1988; he did not seek re-election in 1991. He has also served on the board of Brantford's Progressive Conservative Party of Ontario association. Many expected that he would run for the party in the 2007 provincial election, but he declined.

1988 Brantford municipal election: Councillor, Ward Three (two members elected)
Candidate	Votes	%
Mike Hancock	3,148	27.45
(x)Max Sherman	3,065	26.73
Chris Brown	2,982	26.01
Vince Bucci	2,272	19.81
Total valid votes	11,467	100

1988 Brantford municipal election: Councillor, Ward Four (two members elected)
Candidate	Votes	%
(x)Andy Woodburn	2,925	34.94
Rina Colaiacovo	2,217	26.48
Dan Houssar	1,763	21.06
Bob Szoke	1,466	17.51
Total valid votes	8,371	100
