= Mac Makarchuk =

Canadian politician and journalist (1929–2021)

Member of the Ontario Provincial Parliament for Brantford
- In office 1975–1981
- Preceded by: Dick Beckett
- Succeeded by: Phil Gillies
- In office 1967–1971
- Preceded by: George Gordon
- Succeeded by: Dick Beckett

Personal details
- Born: November 1, 1929 Stenen, Saskatchewan
- Died: July 24, 2021 (aged 91) Barrie, Ontario
- Party: New Democrat
- Profession: Journalist

Mitro "Mac" Makarchuk (November 1, 1929 – July 24, 2021) was a Canadian politician and journalist. He was an Ontario New Democratic Party Member of Provincial Parliament for Brantford from 1967 to 1971 and again from 1975 to 1981.

== Early life ==
Makarchuk was born in Saskatchewan in 1929. In 1959, as a first year student at the University of Toronto, Makarchuk offered to underwrite a Canadian intercollegiate hockey championship between the University of Toronto Varsity Blues men's ice hockey team and University of Saskatchewan Huskies as there was no national playoff between eastern and western Canadian regional hockey champions. The University of Saskatchewan accepted the offer but it was rejected by the University of Toronto. A national university hockey championship, the University Cup was ultimately established in 1963. He then moved to Ontario and worked as a journalist for the Brantford Expositor.

== Politics ==
He was the New Democratic Party of Canada's candidate in the 1965 federal election in the riding of Brantford but was defeated, coming in third place. He was nominated to be the provincial party's candidate in the 1967 provincial election and sought a leave of absence from the Expositor but was refused and then fired.

He was elected to the provincial riding of Brantford to the Ontario legislature in 1967. He served a term before being defeated in 1971 by Progressive Conservative Dick Beckett. He was then elected to Brantford city council as an alderman in 1972.

He returned to the legislature in the 1975, this time defeating Beckett. He was re-elected in the 1977 provincial election. He lost his seat in 1981 to PC candidate Phil Gillies.

Makarchuk returned to Brantford City Council by winning a seat in the 1982 municipal election, serving for a three-year term as councillor for ward 4 before retiring from politics in 1985.
