= Phil Gillies =

Canadian politician (born 1954)

The Honourable Phil Gillies ECO

Minister of Skills Development
- In office May 1985 – June 1985
- Premier: Frank Miller
- Preceded by: Ernie Eves
- Succeeded by: Greg Sorbara

Minister without portfolio
- In office February 1985 – May 1985
- Premier: Frank Miller

Member of the Ontario Provincial Parliament for Brantford
- In office March 19, 1981 – September 10, 1987
- Preceded by: Mac Makarchuk
- Succeeded by: Dave Neumann

Personal details
- Born: May 7, 1954 (age 72) Hertfordshire, England
- Party: Progressive Conservative
- Profession: Advertising executive

Philip Andrew Gillies (born May 7, 1954) is a former politician in Ontario, Canada. He served in the Legislative Assembly of Ontario from 1981 to 1987 as a Progressive Conservative, and was a cabinet minister in the government of Frank Miller.

== Background ==
Gillies' early life and education were in Queenborough in Kent, England. His family moved to Brantford, Ontario, Canada when he was seven. Gillies attended elementary and secondary schools there. He completed his education at the University of Western Ontario and worked as an advertising executive.

== Politics ==
He ran for the Ontario legislature in the 1977 provincial election, but lost to New Democratic Party candidate Mac Makarchuk in the riding of Brantford. In 1977 and 1978, Gillies worked as research assistant to Ontario Premier Bill Davis. He ran again in the 1981 election, and defeated Makarchuk by over 3,000 votes.

Gillies served as a backbench supporter of the Davis government, and endorsed Larry Grossman for the party leadership in January 1985; Grossman, however, would lose the leadership contest to Frank Miller. When Miller became the Premier of Ontario on February 8, 1985, he named Gillies as a minister without portfolio.

The Progressive Conservative Party was reduced to a tenuous minority government following the 1985 provincial election. Gillies himself was narrowly re-elected in Brantford, defeating NDP candidate Jack Tubman by 1,141 votes. He was promoted to Minister of Skills Development on May 17, 1985 but accomplished little before the Tories were defeated in a non-confidence motion in the house two months later.

In opposition, Gillies served as his party's critic for skills development, labour and the environment. Gillies took an interest in labour and human rights issues, and was one of the first PC MPPs to work for LGBT rights in Ontario. He was defeated in the 1987 provincial election, finishing third against Liberal candidate Dave Neumann.

Gillies ran communications and advertising for the Ontario Progressive Conservatives in the 1990 provincial election in support of new party leader Mike Harris.

=== Cabinet positions ===
Miller ministry, Province of Ontario (1985)
Cabinet posts (2)
Predecessor	Office	Successor
Ernie Eves	Minister of Skills Development; 1985 (May - June); Also Responsible for Youth	Greg Sorbara
Sub-Cabinet Post
Predecessor	Title	Successor
	Minister without portfolio (1985 (February - May)); Responsible for Youth	

== Later life ==
After leaving politics, Gillies became a vice-president of the public relations firm Hill & Knowlton. He later worked as a consultant for the Liquor Control Board of Ontario, the Royal Bank of Canada and other corporations and non-profit organizations, and came out as gay. He has served as a director of Orchestra London, the Brant Social Development Council, the Brantford Symphony Orchestra, and the Enos Foundation, the Public Affairs Association of Canada, the Toronto Mayor's Evening for the Arts and serves on the advisory council of ProudPolitics. Gillies has also served on committees for Autism Speaks Canada and TVOntario.

Gillies has published columns in the Toronto Star, Toronto Sun and Hamilton Spectator.

Gillies worked on endangered species issues for the WildAid Conservation Society in 2011 and 2012. In 2013 and 2014, he provided consulting services to the Patey Law Group, Accident Resolution Group, Canadian Centre on Substance Abuse, the Carpenters Union, Clean Prosperity and Toronto Expo 2025.

In 2011, Gillies helped spearhead a national campaign to have shark fin banned in Canada. He led his hometown of Brantford to become the first municipality in North America to ban the trade and possession of shark fin through a by-law passed on May 24, 2011. This led to the introduction of similar legislation in Toronto, Oakville, Mississauga and other Canadian cities. These municipal campaigns led Canada's Parliament to pass legislation to ban the national shark fin trade. This became law in June, 2019.

Gillies ran as the Progressive Conservative candidate in Brant in the 2014 election, but was not re-elected to the legislature. In the summer of 2014, Gillies became Associate Director of Policy on the campaign of Toronto mayoralty candidate John Tory.

In January 2015, Toronto mayor John Tory named Gillies as secretary of the Mayor's Task Force on Toronto Community Housing, under the chairmanship of Senator Art Eggleton. In June 2016 Gillies joined Enterprise Canada Public Affairs as Municipal Practice Lead. At Enterprise, he has represented corporations including Enbridge Gas Distribution, Emovis Technologies, associations such as the Downtown-Yonge Business Improvement Area, and governments/public agencies including York Region, Peel Region, Halton Region, the City of Hamilton, City of Niagara Falls and Metrolinx.

In 2016 at the annual convention of the Ontario Progressive Conservative Party, Gillies was presented with a special achievement award by leader Patrick Brown for his decades of service to the party.

In 2018 Phil Gillies was appointed executive director of the Ontario Construction Consortium, a thinktank supported by the unionized construction sector.

In 2023, Gillies was appointed a director of Ontario One Call.

== Electoral record ==
2014 Ontario general election
Party	Candidate	Votes	%	±%
Liberal	Dave Levac	19,346	37.14	+0.06
Progressive Conservative	Phil Gillies	16,041	30.80	-3.85
New Democratic	Alex Felsky	13,992	26.86	+2.66
Green	Ken Burns	2,095	4.02	+1.92
Libertarian	Rob Ferguson	374	0.72	+0.30
Freedom	Brittni Mitchell	179	0.34	+0.04
Pauper	John Turmel	61	0.12	-0.07
Total valid votes		52,088	100.00	
Liberal hold		Swing		+1.96
Source: Elections Ontario

1987 Ontario general election: Brantford
Party	Candidate	Votes	%	±%	Expenditures
Liberal	Dave Neumann	14,919	41.29	+21.05	$35,227
New Democratic	Jack Tubman	12,112	33.52	–4.59	$33,914
Progressive Conservative	Phil Gillies	9,104	25.19	–16.45	$42,033
Total valid votes/expenditure limit		36,135	99.52	–	$46,944
Total rejected ballots		175	0.48	+0.13	
Turnout		36,310	68.80	+4.03	
Eligible voters		52,776			
Liberal gain from Progressive Conservative		Swing		+12.82	
Source: Elections Ontario

1985 Ontario general election: Brantford
Party	Candidate	Votes	%	±%	Expenditures
Progressive Conservative	Phil Gillies	13,444	41.65	–3.70	$40,482
New Democratic	Jack Tubman	12,303	38.11	+4.27	$23,157
Liberal	Herb German	6,533	20.24	–0.57	$14,378
Total valid votes		32,280	99.65		
Total rejected ballots		115	0.36	–0.00	
Turnout		32,395	64.77	+5.40	
Eligible voters		50,013			
Progressive Conservative hold		Swing		–3.98	
Source: Elections Ontario

1981 Ontario general election: Brantford
Party	Candidate	Votes	%	±%
Progressive Conservative	Phil Gillies	12,847	45.35	+13.58
New Democratic	Mac Makarchuk	9,588	33.84	–12.95
Liberal	Herb German	5,896	20.81	–0.63
Total valid votes		28,331	99.64	
Total rejected ballots		102	0.36	–0.09
Turnout		28,433	59.38	–5.43
Eligible voters		47,887		
Progressive Conservative gain from New Democratic		Swing		+13.26
Source: Elections Ontario

1977 Ontario general election: Brantford
Party	Candidate	Votes	%	±%	Expenditures
New Democratic	Mac Makarchuk	13,376	46.79	+7.73	$17,720
Progressive Conservative	Phil Gillies	9,081	31.77	+2.29	$26,618
Liberal	Arne Jensen Zabell	6,130	21.44	–9.65	$8,868
Total valid votes		28,587	99.55		
Total rejected ballots		128	0.45	+0.13	
Turnout		28,715	64.80	–7.77	
Eligible voters		44,311			
New Democratic hold		Swing		+2.72	
Source: Elections Ontario
