= Brad Ward =

Canadian politician (born 1956)

Member of Provincial Parliament for Brantford
- In office September 6, 1990 – June 8, 1995
- Preceded by: Dave Neumann
- Succeeded by: Ron Johnson

Brantford City Councillor for Ward Two
- In office 1985–1990 Serving with Kevin Davis
- Preceded by: Bob Lancaster and Peter Hexamer
- Succeeded by: Bob Taylor

Personal details
- Born: November 23, 1956 (age 69)
- Party: New Democratic (federal); New Democratic (provincial)

Bradley Richard Ward (born November 23, 1956) is a former politician in Ontario, Canada. He served in the Legislative Assembly of Ontario from 1990 to 1995 as a New Democrat and was a junior minister in Bob Rae's government from 1993 to 1995. He will be the New Democratic candidate in the upcoming 2026 Brantford—Brant South federal by-election.

== Background ==
Ward was a Bell Canada employee before entering political life. Active in the labour movement, he served on the Brantford and District Labour Council and was named Labour Citizen of the Year in 1989.

== Municipal politics ==
He ran for the Brantford City Council in 1982 on a Labour Council/New Democratic Party ticket and finished third in the second ward.

Ward was elected to city council on his second attempt in 1985, the only successful candidate to be endorsed by the labour council. He was re-elected without opposition in 1988. While on council, he served as chair of Brantford's Riverfest.

== Provincial politics ==
Ward was elected to the Ontario legislature in the 1990 provincial election, defeating Liberal incumbent Dave Neumann in the Brantford riding. The New Democratic Party won a majority government in this election under Bob Rae's leadership, and Ward entered the legislature as a government backbencher. He was parliamentary assistant to the Minister of Skills Development from 1990 to 1991 and then to the Minister of Industry, Trade and Technology from 1991 to 1993.

On February 3, 1993, he was promoted to minister without portfolio in the Ministry of Finance, where he worked under Finance Minister Floyd Laughren. He did not have formal ministerial responsibilities, and his duties included represented the Rae government at events such as pre-budgetary consultations. Ward was credited with helping to bring a women's shelter to Brantford during his time in government.

In May 1993, the Rae government cancelled a plan to move the computer and telecommunications division of the Ministry of Government Services from Toronto to Brantford, citing financial concerns. Three days earlier, Ward had told a local reporter that Brantford residents should not be worried about changes to the plan. Some criticized him as being unaware of shifts in government policy. Ward later confronted protesters who opposed the policy change and defended what he described as a "tough expenditures decision."

The New Democratic Party was defeated in the 1995 provincial election, and Ward finished third against Progressive Conservative candidate Ron Johnson in Brantford.

=== Cabinet positions ===
Rae ministry, Province of Ontario (1990–1995)
Sub-Cabinet Post
Predecessor	Title	Successor
	Minister Without Portfolio (1993-1995); Responsible for Finance	

== After politics ==
Ward returned to private life after 1995, working for Bell Canada in business technology. At one time, he served as president of the Communications, Energy and Paperworkers Union of Canada, Local 45. The Brant New Democratic Party honoured him for his involvement in public life in September 2000.

== Return to politics ==
In 2025, Ward was elected as the president of the Brant NDP federal and provincial riding associations. In October 2026, Ward announced that he would seek the NDP nomination for the 2026 Brantford—Brant South federal by-election.

== Electoral record ==
Canadian federal by-election, December 7, 2026: Brantford—Brant South
Party	Candidate	Votes	%	±%	Expenditures
Conservative	Kevin Davis				
Liberal	Joy O'Donnell				
New Democratic	Brad Ward				
Green	Kathryn Kissinger				
People's	TBD				
Independent	Dave Carrol				
Total valid votes/expense limit			–		
Total rejected ballots					
Turnout					
Eligible voters					
Source: Elections Canada

1995 Ontario general election: Brantford
Party	Candidate	Votes	%	±%	Expenditures
Progressive Conservative	Ron Johnson	13,745	41.01	+32.54	$36,072
Liberal	Dave Neumann	10,418	31.08	–6.33	$25,897
New Democratic	Brad Ward	8,165	24.36	–24.27	$41,119
Family Coalition	Paul Vandervet	762	2.27	–1.60	$776
Green	William Darfler	430	1.28	+0.09	$622
Total valid votes		33,520	99.15		
Total rejected, unmarked and declined ballots		288	0.85	+0.07	
Turnout		33,808	59.90	–6.81	
Eligible voters		56,445			
Progressive Conservative gain from New Democratic		Swing		+28.41	
Source: Elections Ontario

1990 Ontario general election: Brantford
Party	Candidate	Votes	%	±%	Expenditures
New Democratic	Brad Ward	17,736	48.63	+15.11	$28,075
Liberal	Dave Neumann	13,644	37.41	–3.88	$35,029
Progressive Conservative	Daniel Di Sabatino	3,087	8.46	–16.73	$7,083
Family Coalition	Peter Quail	1,413	3.87	–	$7,153
Green	William Darfler	436	1.20	–	$0
Libertarian	Helmut Kurmis	158	0.43	–	$0
Total valid votes/expenditure limit		36,474	99.22	–	$47,526
Total rejected, unmarked and declined ballots		286	0.78	+0.30	
Turnout		36,760	66.71	–2.09	
Eligible voters		55,106			
New Democratic gain from Liberal		Swing		+9.49	
Source: Elections Ontario

1988 Brantford municipal election: Councillor, Ward Two (two members elected)
Candidate	Votes	%
(x)Kevin Davis	acclaimed	-
(x)Brad Ward	acclaimed	-

1985 Brantford municipal election: Councillor, Ward Two (two members elected)
Candidate	Votes	%
Kevin Davis	2,483	32.28
Brad Ward	1,906	24.78
Vince Bucci	1,292	16.80
Tom Potter	974	12.66
Enid Green	648	8.43
Paul Mellor	388	5.04
Total valid votes	7,691	100

1982 Brantford municipal election: Councillor, Ward Two (two members elected)
Candidate	Votes	%
(x)Bob Lancaster	3,163	36.60
(x)Peter Hexamer	2,668	30.88
Brad Ward	1,238	14.33
Dan O'Regan	1,195	13.83
Andrew Sywyk	377	4.36
Total valid votes	8,641	100
