= 2018 Brantford municipal election =

2018 Brantford mayoral election
← 2014	October 22, 2018	2022 →
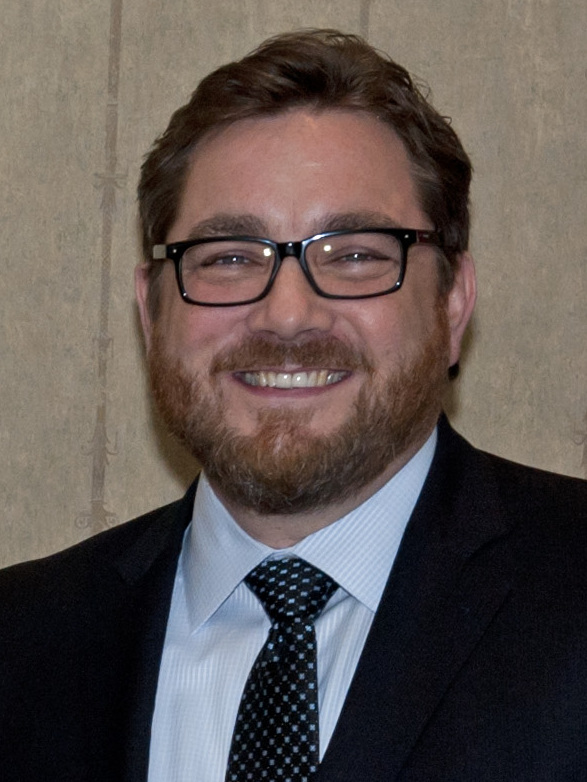
	KD		DW
Candidate	Kevin Davis	Chris Friel	Dave Wrobel
Popular vote	12,867	7,200	3,345
Percentage	52.93%	29.62%	13.76%
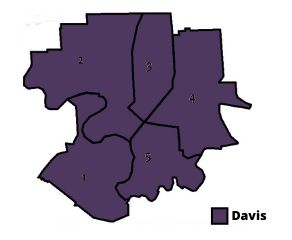
- Results by municipal ward
Mayor of Brantford before election
Chris Friel
Elected Mayor of Brantford
Kevin Davis

The 2018 Brantford municipal election took place on October 22, 2018. Incumbent Mayor Chris Friel lost re-election to Kevin Davis.

== Mayoral candidates ==
- Chris Friel, incumbent Mayor
- Kevin Davis, lawyer and former City Councillor
- Dave Wrobel, former City Councillor and mayoral candidate in 2014
- Barbara Berardi, local businesswoman
- Michael Issa, retired business executive
- John Turmel, perennial candidate
- Wayne Maw, volunteer and activist

== Results ==
=== Mayor ===
Mayoral Candidate	Vote	%
Kevin Davis	12,867	52.93
Chris Friel (X)	7,200	29.62
Dave Wrobel	3,345	13.76
Barbara Berardi	532	2.19
Michael Issa	186	0.77
John Turmel	128	0.53
Wayne Maw	50	0.21

=== Brantford City Council ===
Two to be elected from each ward. The map has changed slightly from 2014 due to the annexation of some territory from Brant County.

The results for city council are as follows:

Ward 1
Candidate	Vote	%
Rick Weaver (X)	2,054	30.41
Jan vander Stelt	1,874	27.73
Michael Sullivan	966	14.30
Mario Lucente	889	13.16
Tracey Bucci	449	6.65
Ramandeep Khokhar	399	5.91
Amrik Deol	125	1.85

Ward 2
Candidate	Vote	%
John Utley (X)	2,952	28.06
John Sless (X)	2,933	27.87
Alex Felsky	1,914	18.19
Warren Bechard	976	9.28
Erica James	687	6.53
Peter Sheere	677	6.43
Sandra Anderson	383	3.64

Ward 3
Candidate	Vote	%
Dan McCreary (X)	4,214	37.40
Greg Martin (X)	3,477	30.86
Linda Hunt	1,717	15.24
Naser Hamed	933	8.28
Nicole Durnford	926	8.22

Ward 4
Candidate	Vote	%
Richard Carpenter (X)	3,842	45.69
Cheryl Antoski (X)	3,601	42.83
Rob Ferguson	671	7.98
Mike Gomon	294	3.50

Ward 5
Candidate	Vote	%
Brian Van Tilborg (X)	1,471	26.67
Joshua Wall	954	17.04
Mark Littell	879	15.70
John Oneill	831	14.84
Kathryn Kissinger	502	8.96
Ian Carson	236	4.21
Dustin Starchuk	233	4.16
Jeff Goreski	206	3.68
David Swanson	119	2.13
Dale Beemer	100	1.79
Michael Peterson	69	1.23
