= Charles Strange =

Canadian politician

Ontario MPP
- In office 1943–1945
- Preceded by: Louis Hagey
- Succeeded by: Stanley Dye
- Constituency: Brantford

Personal details
- Born: November 12, 1909 Portslade, Sussex
- Died: May 4, 1992 (aged 82) Simcoe, Ontario
- Political party: CCF
- Spouse: Olive M. Pizzey
- Children: 1
- Occupation: Human resources

Charles Alfred Strange (November 12, 1909 – May 4, 1992) was a politician in Ontario, Canada. He was a CCF member of the Legislative Assembly of Ontario from 1943 to 1945 who represented the riding of Brantford.

== Background ==
He was born in Portslade, Sussex the son of George Frederick Strange and Louisa Bird, and came to Canada in 1930. In 1934, Strange married Olive M. Pizzey. He was a trade union committee secretary. Strange moved to Simcoe, where he worked in personnel at the American Can Company, in 1947. He was a member of the St. John Ambulance. Strange died in Simcoe at the age of 82.

== Politics ==
He ran as the CCF candidate in the 1943 provincial election. He defeated Liberal incumbent Louis Hagey by 1,049 votes. He served as a member of the official opposition behind CCF leader Ted Jolliffe. In the 1945 election he was defeated by Progressive Conservative candidate Stanley Dye by 2,516 votes.
