= 2014 Brantford municipal election =

2014 Brantford mayoral election
← 2010	October 27, 2014	2018 →
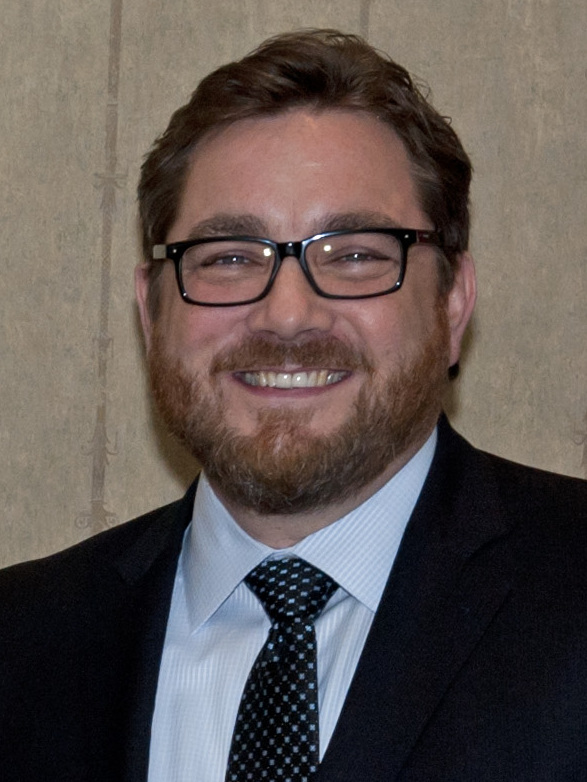
		JV	DW
Candidate	Chris Friel	Jan Vaderstelt	Dave Wrobel
Popular vote	8,743	4,519	4,042
Percentage	36.02%	18.62%	16.65%
Mayor of Brantford before election
Chris Friel
Elected Mayor of Brantford
Chris Friel

The 2014 Brantford municipal election took place on October 27, 2014. Incumbent Mayor Chris Friel was re-elected.

== Mayoral candidates ==
- Chris Friel, incumbent Mayor
- Jan Vanderstelt, local businessman and Ward 1 City Councillor
- Dave Wrobel, Ward 4 City Councillor
- Mike St. Amant, local businessman
- Mark Littell, former City Councillor
- Mary Ellen Kaye, activist
- John Turmel, perennial candidate

== Results ==
=== Mayor ===
Mayoral Candidate	Vote	%
Chris Friel (X)	8,743	36.02
Jan Vanderstelt	4,519	18.62
Dave Wrobel	4,042	16.65
Michael St. Amant	3,703	15.26
Mark H. Littell	2,018	8.31
Mary Ellen Kaye	1,113	4.59
John Turmel	133	0.55
