= George Gordon (Ontario politician) =

Canadian politician

Ontario MPP
- In office 1948–1967
- Preceded by: Stanley Dye
- Succeeded by: Mac Makarchuk
- Constituency: Brantford

Personal details
- Born: August 13, 1888 Dublin, Ireland
- Died: February 22, 1971 (aged 82) Brantford, Ontario
- Party: Liberal
- Spouse: Edith Mary Godden
- Children: 5

George Thomas Gordon (August 13, 1888 - February 22, 1971) was a politician in Ontario, Canada. He was a Liberal member of the Legislative Assembly of Ontario from 1948 to 1967 who represented the riding of Brantford.

== Background ==
Gordon was born in Dublin, Ireland. He was married to Edith Mary Godden (1891-1963) and they had five children. He died in Brantford, Ontario at the age of 82.

== Politics ==
Gordon was a long time alderman for the town of Brantford, Ontario. He was elected in 1930 and stayed for 18 years before entering provincial politics.

In the 1948 provincial election, Gordon ran as the Liberal candidate in the riding of Brantford. He defeated CCF candidate Reginald Cooper by 1,142 votes. Conservative incumbent Stanley Dye who was running as an independent, finished 4th in the polling. Over the next 19 years as an MPP, he was re-elected four times. In the 1963 provincial election his winning margin was only 23 votes. He retired from politics in 1967.

During his 23 years as a member of the legislature his participation was spent in committee work and serving as a backbench supporter of five different opposition leaders.
