= Richard B. Beckett =

Canadian politician

Dick Bennett

Ontario MPP
- In office 1971–1975
- Preceded by: Mac Makarchuk
- Succeeded by: Mac Makarchuk
- Constituency: Brantford

Personal details
- Born: 1919 Brantford, Ontario
- Died: March 7, 1983 (aged 63) Brantford, Ontario
- Party: Progressive Conservative
- Occupation: Funeral home director

Richard Burnell Beckett (1919 – March 7, 1983) was a Canadian politician, who represented Brantford in the Legislative Assembly of Ontario from 1971 to 1975 as a Progressive Conservative member.

In 1939, Richard Beckett joined his father, H.B. Beckett, in the operation of the family funeral home in Brantford.

Serving in the Canadian Army Active Service from 1939 to 1946, Richard Beckett retired with the rank of Major and returned to his home town of Brantford where he continued to provide extraordinary leadership in local politics, service groups and committees. Between 1953 and 1970, Richard served 5 years as Alderman and 10 years as Mayor of Brantford (1961–1970). In 1971, Richard became Brant MPP and worked as Parliamentary Assistant to both Minister of Transportation and Communication (March 7, 1974 - January 15, 1975), and the Treasurer and Minister of Economics and Intergovernmental Affairs (January 15, 1975 - January 20, 1976).

To celebrate his selfless community involvement, the Brantford Jaycees honoured Richard as the 1970 Citizen of the Year and the City of Brantford honoured him as the year 2000 addition to the municipal "Wall of Recognition".

He died on March 7, 1983, and he is buried in the Farringdon Burial Ground, Brantford, Ontario.
