= Stanley Dye =

Canadian politician

Ontario MPP
- In office 1945–1948
- Preceded by: Charles Strange
- Succeeded by: George Gordon
- Constituency: Brantford

Personal details
- Born: March 12, 1908 London, England
- Died: July 3, 2003 (aged 95) Brantford, Ontario
- Party: Progressive Conservative
- Spouse: Selina Kingswood
- Occupation: Mechanic

Military service
- Allegiance: Canadian
- Branch/service: 2nd Canadian Infantry Division
- Years of service: 1940-1945
- Rank: Corporal
- Battles/wars: Dieppe Raid

Stanley Harding Dye (March 12, 1908 – July 3, 2003) was a politician in Ontario, Canada. He was Progressive Conservative member from 1945 to 1948 who represented the riding of Brantford.

== Background ==
Dye was born in London, England, he is the son of Charles Harding Dye, was educated there and came to Canada in 1928. In 1944, he married Selina Kingswood. He served overseas during World War II and was wounded at Dieppe. Dye was manager for the Brantford Chiefs of the OHA.

== Politics ==
He ran as the Progressive Conservative candidate in the 1945 provincial election. He defeated Liberal candidate Donald Williamson by a slim margin of 27 votes. Williamson contemplated but eventually declined to request a recount. He served as a backbench supporter in the government of George Drew.

In 1948, the PC nomination in the riding was contested and Dye lost to C.C. Slemin. Instead Dye put his name forward as an independent Conservative candidate but finished 4th in the polling. Slemin lost to Liberal George Gordon.

== Later life ==
In 1960 he was appointed as a bailiff. It was alleged that he received the appointment for his past service as PC MPP. He died in Brantford in 2003.
