= Louis Hagey =

Canadian politician

Ontario MPP
- In office 1938–1943
- Preceded by: Morrison MacBride
- Succeeded by: Charles Strange
- Constituency: Brantford

Personal details
- Born: July 19, 1906
- Died: March 12, 1967 (aged 60); Brantford, Ontario
- Political party: Liberal
- Relations: Gerry Hagey (cousin); Joseph B. Hagey (great grandson)
- Occupation: Lawyer

Henry Louis Hagey, QC (July 19, 1906 – March 12, 1967) was a politician in Ontario, Canada. He was a Liberal member of the Legislative Assembly of Ontario from 1938 to 1943 who represented the riding of Brantford. He won his seat in a by-election after the previous member, Morrison MacBride died in office.

== Background ==
Hagey was educated at Brantford Collegiate Institute and obtained a degree from Waterloo College in 1929. He attended Osgoode Hall and was called to the bar in 1932. Hagey served as past master of Doric Lodge, AF and AM, 32nd degree Scottish Rite. Hagey was the great-grandson of the Mennonite Bishop Joseph B. Hagey and his cousin, Gerry Hagey, founded the University of Waterloo. He married Ardell Tennant with whom he had four children. He died in Brantford in 1967 at the age of 60.

== Politics ==
In 1933, he became an alderman for the town of Brantford, Ontario. He remained in the position for the next five years. During his time on council he also served as chair of the Public Utilities Commission. In 1938, the local MPP, Morrison MacBride died and a by-election was held to replace him. Hagey stood as the candidate for the Liberal Party and defeated Conservative candidate Reginald Welsh by 1,146 votes on July 20, 1938. Hagey sat as a backbench supporter of the Mitchell Hepburn government.

In the 1943 election, he was defeated by CCF candidate Charles Strange by 1,045 votes.
