= Brantford—Brant South =

Federal electoral district in Ontario, Canada

Ontario electoral district
- Interactive map of riding boundaries from the 2025 federal election

Federal electoral district
- Legislature: House of Commons
MP
Vacant
- District created: 2023
- First contested: 2025
- District webpage: profile, map

Demographics
- Population (2021): 121,511
- Electors (2025): 101,284
- Area (km²): 898
- Pop. density (per km²): 135.3
- Census division: Brant
- Census subdivision(s): Brantford, Brant (part), Six Nations, New Credit

Brantford—Brant South (French: Brantford—Brant-Sud) is a federal electoral district in Ontario, Canada. It came into effect upon the call of the 2025 Canadian federal election.

Initially created as Brantford—Brant South—Six Nations (French: Brantford—Brant-Sud—Six Nations), the riding's name was changed in 2026 as part of Bill C-25 of the 45th Canadian Parliament.

== 2026 By-Election ==
Larry Brock resigned as an MP on September 18, 2026. The riding will be vacant until a by-election is called. The Prime Minister may call a by-election up to 6 months after the resignation takes effect.

On Sunday, November 1st, Prime Minister Mark Carney called the Brantford-Brant South by-election. It will be held on December 7th, 2026. There are 4 announced candidates:

- Dave Carrol (Independent)
- Kevin Davis (Conservative)
- Joy O'Donnell (Liberal)
- Brad Ward (NDP)

== Geography ==
Under the 2022 Canadian federal electoral redistribution the riding largely replaced Brantford—Brant and also gained the remainder of the County of Brant from the Oxford riding. The rest of the County of Brant moved to the new riding of Flamborough—Glanbrook—Brant North. The riding name refers to the Six Nations of the Grand River which is the largest First Nations reserve in Canada.

== Demographics ==
According to the 2021 Canadian census

Languages: 86.9% English, 1.9% Punjabi, 1.3% French, 1.2% Polish

Religions: 52.8% Christian (22.3% Catholic, 5.2% Anglican, 5.1% United Church, 2.7% Baptist, 1.6% Presbyterian, 1.5% Pentecostal, 1.2% Reformed, 13.1% Other), 40.1% No religion, 2.3% Sikh, 1.8% Muslim, 1.5% Hindu

Median income: $40,000 (2020)

Average income: $48,400 (2020)

Panethnic groups in Brantford—Brant South—Six Nations (2021)
Panethnic group	2021	
Panethnic group	Pop.	%
European (Note: Statistic includes all persons that did not make up part of a visible minority or an indigenous identity.)	96,985	80.95%
Indigenous	6,475	5.4%
South Asian	6,295	5.25%
African	3,710	3.1%
Southeast Asian (Note: Statistic includes total responses of "Filipino" and "Southeast Asian" under visible minority section on census.)	2,440	2.04%
East Asian (Note: Statistic includes total responses of "Chinese", "Korean", and "Japanese" under visible minority section on census.)	1,085	0.91%
Latin American	965	0.81%
Middle Eastern (Note: Statistic includes total responses of "West Asian" and "Arab" under visible minority section on census.)	920	0.77%
Other/multiracial (Note: Statistic includes total responses of "Visible minority, n.i.e." and "Multiple visible minorities" under visible minority section on census.)	940	0.78%
Total responses	119,815	98.58%
Total population	121,545	100%
Notes: Totals greater than 100% due to multiple origin responses. Demographics based on 2022 Canadian federal electoral redistribution riding boundaries.

== Federal riding associations ==
Riding associations are the local branches of the national political parties:

Party	Association name	CEO	HQ city
Conservative Party of Canada	Brantford--Brant South--Six Nations Conservative Association	Caine Chapman	Brantford
Green Party of Canada	Brantford--Brant South--Six Nations Green Party Association	Ken Burns	Hamilton
Liberal Party of Canada	Brantford--Brant South--Six Nations Federal Liberal Association	Jamie Crick	Brantford
New Democratic Party	Brantford--Brant South--Six Nations Federal NDP Riding Association	Brian Trujillo	Ottawa

== History ==
Parliament	Years	Member	Party
Brantford—Brant South—Six Nations; Riding created from Brantford—Brant and Oxford
45th	2025–2026	Larry Brock	Conservative
Brantford—Brant South; Riding renamed by Bill C-25
45th	2026–2026	Larry Brock	Conservative
45th	2026–present	Vacant	Vacant

== Electoral Results ==
Pending by-election (2026)

Canadian federal by-election, December 7, 2026 Resignation of Larry Brock
The by-election will be held on December 7, 2026.
Party	Candidate	Votes	%	±%	Expenditures
Conservative	Kevin Davis				
Liberal	Joy O'Donnell				
New Democratic	Brad Ward				
Green	Kathryn Kissinger				
People's	TBD				
Christian Heritage	Dirk Byers				
Independent	Dave Carrol				
Independent	Mike Clancy				
Total valid votes/expense limit			–		
Total rejected ballots					
Turnout					
Eligible voters					
Source: Elections Canada

2025 general election

2025 Canadian federal election: Brantford—Brant South—Six Nations
Party	Candidate	Votes	%	±%	Expenditures
Conservative	Larry Brock	34,501	52.44	+12.36	$127,957.24
Liberal	Joy O'Donnell	27,032	41.09	+13.36	$124,026.65
New Democratic	Anne Gajerski-Cauley	2,410	3.66	–16.63	$1,529.63
Green	Karleigh Csordas	1,110	1.69	–0.95	$14,780.53
People's	Nicholas Xenos	392	0.60	–8.18	$3,633.49
Independent	Mike Clancy	148	0.22	N/A	$0.00
Independent	Leslie Bory	120	0.18	N/A	$839.52
Independent	Clo Marie	80	0.12	N/A	$0.00
Total valid votes/expense limit		65,793	99.46	–	$147,446.43
Total rejected ballots		357	0.54		
Turnout		66,150	64.60		
Eligible voters		102,397			
Conservative hold		Swing		–0.50	
Source: Elections Canada

2021 transposed result

2021 federal election redistributed results
Party	Vote	%
Conservative	22,466	40.08
Liberal	15,543	27.73
New Democratic	11,373	20.29
People's	4,919	8.78
Green	1,478	2.64
Others	269	0.48

== See also ==
- List of Canadian electoral districts
