= Joseph B. Hagey =

- Born: June 11, 1810; Franconia Township, Montgomery County, Pennsylvania
- Died: December 21, 1876 (aged 66); Breslau, Ontario
- Occupation: Bishop of the Mennonite Church in Ontario
- Spouse: Sophia Bricker
- Parent(s): Daniel and Elizabeth Hagey née Bergey

Joseph B. Hagey (11 June 1810 – 31 December 1876) was the Bishop of the Mennonite Church in Ontario from 1852 until his death in 1876. Bishop Hagey presided over a time of disagreement and schism within the Mennonite Church in Canada. He was married to Sophia Bricker, the daughter of notable Mennonite Samuel Bricker. Bricker, with partner Daniel Erb, arranged for the purchase of the large tracts of land around the Grand River from native leader Joseph Brant through Richard Beasley. This settlement became the city of Waterloo, Ontario. Bishop Hagey succeeded Bishop Benjamin Eby.

== Early life ==
Hagey was born on June 11, 1810, in Franconia Township, Montgomery County, Pennsylvania, to Daniel and Elizabeth (Bergey) Hagey. Daniel Hagey's patrilineal ancestors had lived in Saxony before emigrating to the United States, and Ezra E. Eby claims that the family originated in southern Switzerland, which they left to flee religious persecution.

Joseph and his twin brother, Daniel, had an older brother Jacob, two younger brothers Isaac and Henry, and younger sister Sallie. In 1832, he married Sophia Bricker (December 20, 1810 – November 4, 1895). Joseph and Sophia Hagey had six sons and five daughters, Peter, Elizabeth, Daniel, Leah, Rebecca, Samuel, Mary, Joseph, Jacob, Sophia and Henry. Hagey also adopted the orphan Moses Springer in 1834, who went on to become the first mayor of the town of Waterloo, Ontario, in 1876.

In 1822, Joseph Hagey came with his family from Pennsylvania after his father Daniel Hagey filed for bankruptcy after the store he operated left him almost $1200 in debt in 1821 and left Pennsylvania to escape the scandal. The Hageys lived on a farm just north of Preston (now a part of Cambridge). After their marriage, Joseph and Sophia lived on the farm owned by her father; they became the owners in 1837.

== Ministry ==
Hagey was ordained as a minister on February 10, 1839, most likely by Benjamin Eby. Hagey was ordained bishop to aid the elderly Eby on May 31, 1851. He served as both pastor to the Hagey congregation and as bishop to all the congregations in Waterloo Township. Following in the shadow of the much loved and charismatic Eby, Hagey's tenure and accomplishments were never as widely praised.

Towards the end of his career, he was challenged by the divisions revival meetings brought to the Ontario Mennonite Conference. The initial tension was sparked by both a revival in Solomon Eby's congregation in Port Elgin, Ontario, in 1870, and a similar revival within Waterloo County. These meetings were often held in people's homes in the style of the Methodist prayer or revival tent meeting. This often flamboyant and spontaneous style of liturgy was not generally accepted within the Mennonite community at that time. At first Bishop Hagey embraced new converts form these meetings and baptized those from Eby's Port Elgin revival. This changed by the time the Waterloo converts sought baptism, directly because of objections lodged by the conference leadership itself. This group was baptized later in 1871 by an American bishop invited north by the revivalists, letting the matter increase the growing division between the two camps. The resulting division created the break-away group the Reformed Mennonites (later part of the Mennonite Brethren in Christ).

== Mediation ==
Hagey did assist in several attempts to help resolve a church dispute in Indiana. He was a participant and served as the nominal leader (as bishop) of an Ontario delegation that attempted to mediate the conflict.

== Death ==
Joseph died December 31, 1876, and was buried in the Breslau Mennonite Cemetery. It was said that three hundred carriages were part of the funeral procession, with one thousand persons in attendance at the service.

== Eby summary ==
The Eby Book of 1856 had this to say regarding Bishop Hagey:

Bishop Joseph Hagey, the second son of Daniel and Elizabeth (Bergey) Hagey, was born in Montgomery County, Pennsylvania, on June 11, 1810. They came to Canada with his parents when twelve years of age. Some time during the summer of 1832 he was married to Sophia, daughter of Samuel and Rebecca (Eby) Bricker. She was born December 20, 1812. Soon after their marriage they moved on the farm now possessed by their son, Joseph B., where they resided until his death which took place December 31, 1876. On May 31, 1851, he was ordained as a minister of the Mennonite body, and on October 11, 1852, he was ordained bishop which position he held until his death. He was well received by both his and other denominations. His fame as a preacher was widely known and served to fill the houses of worship to their utmost capacity wherever he was known to officiate. His sermons were short and always well seasoned with a grand exhortation to be more like our Lord and Master. He was greatly respected by the young and always gladly received by his many friends. His last days on earth were much clouded with the church controversy which was carried so far as to cause a division among the Mennonites. Just at this time came the winged arrow of death and bore the soul of Bishop Hagey from the scenes of his life's activity, from the companionship of his faithful circle of followers, and from the worrying of this world, to the regions beyond the skies where trials and temptations are no more, where Christ reigns supreme, in Heaven. His last words were, 'O what a good and merciful Lord we have'. His end was peace. His widow is still living and has her home with her daughter, Mary. Their family consists of eleven children.

== Descendants ==
Hagey's great-grandson Joseph Gerald "Gerry" Hagey founded the University of Waterloo. Another of Hagey's great-grandson's was Brantford MPP Louis Hagey.
