= Brantford (provincial electoral district) =

Ontario electoral district

Defunct provincial electoral district
- Legislature: Legislative Assembly of Ontario
- District created: 1925
- District abolished: 1996
- First contested: 1926
- Last contested: 1995

Brantford was an electoral riding in Ontario, Canada. It was created in 1925 and was abolished in 1996 before the 1999 election.

== Boundaries ==
As part of changes to the Representation Act in 1925, the riding of Brantford was created to include the city of Brantford, the township of Oakland and the part of the township of Brantford south of the Grand River.

== Members of Provincial Parliament ==
Brantford
Assembly	Years	Member	Party
Riding created from parts of Brant North and Brant South
17th	1926–1929	William George Martin	Conservative
18th	1929–1934	William George Martin	Conservative
19th	1934–1937	M.M. MacBride	Independent
20th	1937–1938	M.M. MacBride	Independent-Liberal
20th	1938–1943	Louis Hagey	Liberal
21st	1943–1945	Charles Strange	Co-operative Commonwealth
22nd	1945–1948	Stanley Dye	Progressive Conservative
23rd	1948–1951	George Gordon	Liberal
24th	1951–1955	George Gordon	Liberal
25th	1955–1959	George Gordon	Liberal
26th	1959–1963	George Gordon	Liberal
27th	1963–1967	George Gordon	Liberal
28th	1967–1971	Mac Makarchuk	New Democratic
29th	1971–1975	Dick Bennett	Progressive Conservative
30th	1975–1977	Mac Makarchuk	New Democratic
31st	1977–1981	Mac Makarchuk	New Democratic
32nd	1981–1985	Phil Gillies	Progressive Conservative
33rd	1985–1987	Phil Gillies	Progressive Conservative
34th	1987–1990	Dave Neumann	Liberal
35th	1990–1995	Brad Ward	New Democratic
36th	1995–1999	Ron Johnson	Progressive Conservative
Sourced from the Ontario Legislative Assembly
Merged into Brant before 1999 election

== Election results ==
1995 Ontario general election
Party	Candidate	Votes	%	±%	Expenditures
Progressive Conservative	Ron Johnson	13,745	41.01	+32.54	$36,072
Liberal	Dave Neumann	10,418	31.08	–6.33	$25,897
New Democratic	Brad Ward	8,165	24.36	–24.27	$41,119
Family Coalition	Paul Vandervet	762	2.27	–1.60	$776
Green	William Darfler	430	1.28	+0.09	$622
Total valid votes		33,520	99.15		
Total rejected, unmarked and declined ballots		288	0.85	+0.07	
Turnout		33,808	59.90	–6.81	
Eligible voters		56,445			
Progressive Conservative gain from New Democratic		Swing		+28.41	
Source: Elections Ontario

1990 Ontario general election
Party	Candidate	Votes	%	±%	Expenditures
New Democratic	Brad Ward	17,736	48.63	+15.11	$28,075
Liberal	Dave Neumann	13,644	37.41	–3.88	$35,029
Progressive Conservative	Daniel Di Sabatino	3,087	8.46	–16.73	$7,083
Family Coalition	Peter Quail	1,413	3.87	–	$7,153
Green	William Darfler	436	1.20	–	$0
Libertarian	Helmut Kurmis	158	0.43	–	$0
Total valid votes/expenditure limit		36,474	99.22	–	$47,526
Total rejected, unmarked and declined ballots		286	0.78	+0.30	
Turnout		36,760	66.71	–2.09	
Eligible voters		55,106			
New Democratic gain from Liberal		Swing		+9.49	
Source: Elections Ontario

1987 Ontario general election
Party	Candidate	Votes	%	±%	Expenditures
Liberal	Dave Neumann	14,919	41.29	+21.05	$35,227
New Democratic	Jack Tubman	12,112	33.52	–4.59	$33,914
Progressive Conservative	Phil Gillies	9,104	25.19	–16.45	$42,033
Total valid votes/expenditure limit		36,135	99.52	–	$46,944
Total rejected ballots		175	0.48	+0.13	
Turnout		36,310	68.80	+4.03	
Eligible voters		52,776			
Liberal gain from Progressive Conservative		Swing		+12.82	
Source: Elections Ontario

1985 Ontario general election
Party	Candidate	Votes	%	±%	Expenditures
Progressive Conservative	Phil Gillies	13,444	41.65	–3.70	$40,482
New Democratic	Jack Tubman	12,303	38.11	+4.27	$23,157
Liberal	Herb German	6,533	20.24	–0.57	$14,378
Total valid votes		32,280	99.65		
Total rejected ballots		115	0.36	–0.00	
Turnout		32,395	64.77	+5.40	
Eligible voters		50,013			
Progressive Conservative hold		Swing		–3.98	
Source: Elections Ontario

1981 Ontario general election
Party	Candidate	Votes	%	±%
Progressive Conservative	Phil Gillies	12,847	45.35	+13.58
New Democratic	Mac Makarchuk	9,588	33.84	–12.95
Liberal	Herb German	5,896	20.81	–0.63
Total valid votes		28,331	99.64	
Total rejected ballots		102	0.36	–0.09
Turnout		28,433	59.38	–5.43
Eligible voters		47,887		
Progressive Conservative gain from New Democratic		Swing		+13.26
Source: Elections Ontario

1977 Ontario general election
Party	Candidate	Votes	%	±%	Expenditures
New Democratic	Mac Makarchuk	13,376	46.79	+7.73	$17,720
Progressive Conservative	Phil Gillies	9,081	31.77	+2.29	$26,618
Liberal	Arne Jensen Zabell	6,130	21.44	–9.65	$8,868
Total valid votes		28,587	99.55		
Total rejected ballots		128	0.45	+0.13	
Turnout		28,715	64.80	–7.77	
Eligible voters		44,311			
New Democratic hold		Swing		+2.72	
Source: Elections Ontario

1975 Ontario general election
Party	Candidate	Votes	%	±%
New Democratic	Mac Makarchuk	12,012	39.06	+6.27
Liberal	David J. Carll	9,562	31.09	+8.92
Progressive Conservative	Richard B. Beckett	9,063	29.47	–15.57
Communist	William P. Small	115	0.37	–
Total valid votes		30,752	99.69	
Total rejected ballots		96	0.31	+0.02
Turnout		30,848	72.58	–8.22
Eligible voters		42,504		
New Democratic gain from Progressive Conservative		Swing		–1.32
Source: Elections Ontario

1971 Ontario general election
Party	Candidate	Votes	%	±%
Progressive Conservative	Richard B. Beckett	16,632	45.04	+10.90
New Democratic	Mac Makarchuk	12,108	32.79	–3.05
Liberal	Ken Lefebvre	8,188	22.17	–7.84
Total valid votes		36,928	99.71	
Total rejected ballots		107	0.29	–0.23
Turnout		37,035	80.80	+6.17
Eligible voters		45,838		
Progressive Conservative gain from New Democratic		Swing		+6.98
Source: Elections Ontario

1967 Ontario general election
Party	Candidate	Votes	%	±%
New Democratic	Mac Makarchuk	10,465	35.84	+23.56
Progressive Conservative	Andy Donaldson	9,968	34.14	–9.27
Liberal	R. Bruce Forbes	8,764	30.02	–13.53
Total valid votes		29,197	99.49	
Total rejected ballots		151	0.51	–0.31
Turnout		29,348	74.63	+3.46
Eligible voters		39,325		
New Democratic gain from Liberal		Swing		+18.55
Source: Elections Ontario

1963 Ontario general election
Party	Candidate	Votes	%	±%
Liberal	George Gordon	7,572	43.55	–1.53
Progressive Conservative	Richard B. Beckett	7,549	43.41	+6.55
New Democratic	Bill Humble	2,136	12.28	–5.77
Independent	Winnifred M. Robinson	131	0.75	–
Total valid votes		17,388	99.17	
Total rejected ballots		145	0.83	+0.28
Turnout		17,533	71.17	–0.00
Eligible voters		24,637		
Liberal hold		Swing		–4.04
Source: Elections Ontario

1959 Ontario general election
Party	Candidate	Votes	%	±%
Liberal	George Gordon	8,011	45.08	+5.53
Progressive Conservative	Max Sherman	6,551	36.87	–0.62
Co-operative Commonwealth	Clare Easto	3,208	18.05	–3.80
Total valid votes		17,770	99.45	
Total rejected ballots		98	0.55	–0.12
Turnout		17,868	71.17	–0.65
Eligible voters		25,107		
Liberal hold		Swing		+3.07
Source: Elections Ontario

1955 Ontario general election
Party	Candidate	Votes	%	±%
Liberal	George Gordon	7,110	39.55	+1.11
Progressive Conservative	James Humble	6,738	37.48	+7.79
Co-operative Commonwealth	John Maycock	3,928	21.85	–10.01
Labor–Progressive	Samuel (Sam) Minchinick	200	1.11	–
Total valid votes		17,976	99.33	
Total rejected ballots		121	0.67	–0.21
Turnout		18,097	71.81	–2.04
Eligible voters		25,200		
Liberal hold		Swing		–3.34
Source: Elections Ontario

1951 Ontario general election
Party	Candidate	Votes	%	±%
Liberal	George Gordon	7,289	38.45	+0.86
Co-operative Commonwealth	Reginald Cooper	6,040	31.86	+0.55
Progressive Conservative	K. V. Bunnell	5,630	29.70	+3.76
Total valid votes		18,959	99.12	
Total rejected ballots		169	0.88	–0.03
Turnout		19,128	73.85	+0.05
Eligible voters		25,901		
Liberal hold		Swing		+0.16
Source: Elections Ontario

1948 Ontario general election
Party	Candidate	Votes	%	±%
Liberal	George Gordon	7,018	37.58	+0.82
Co-operative Commonwealth	Reginald Cooper	5,846	31.31	+7.38
Progressive Conservative	Charles C. Slemin	4,843	25.94	–10.98
Independent PC	Stanley Dye	966	5.17	–31.74
Total valid votes		18,673	99.09	
Total rejected ballots		172	0.91	+0.14
Turnout		18,845	73.80	–0.12
Eligible voters		25,535		
Liberal gain from Progressive Conservative		Swing		+5.90
Source: Elections Ontario

1945 Ontario general election
Party	Candidate	Votes	%	±%
Progressive Conservative	Stanley Dye	6,581	36.91	+8.57
Liberal	Donald D. Williamson	6,555	36.77	+4.83
Co-operative Commonwealth	Charles Strange	4,266	23.93	–15.80
Labor–Progressive	Stephen Kowal	426	2.39	–
Total valid votes		17,828	99.23	
Total rejected ballots		139	0.77	+0.07
Turnout		17,967	73.92	+11.99
Eligible voters		24,306		
Progressive Conservative gain from Co-operative Commonwealth		Swing		+12.19
Source: Elections Ontario

1943 Ontario general election
Party	Candidate	Votes	%	±%
Co-operative Commonwealth	Charles Strange	5,327	39.73	–
Liberal	Louis Hagey	4,282	31.93	–13.37
Progressive Conservative	Gordon D. Campbell	3,800	28.34	–8.89
Total valid votes		13,409	99.30	
Total rejected ballots		95	0.70	+0.70
Turnout		13,504	61.93	–
Eligible voters		21,805		
Co-operative Commonwealth gain from Liberal		Swing		+4.44
Source: Elections Ontario

Ontario provincial by-election, July 20, 1938 Death of Morrison Mann MacBride
Party	Candidate	Votes	%	±%
Liberal	Louis Hagey	6,242	45.30	–
Conservative	Reginald Welsh	5,129	37.23	+0.78
Labour	Walter J. Dowden	2,350	17.06	–
Socialist-Labour	Paul Debragh	57	0.41	–
Total valid votes		13,778	100.00	
Total rejected ballots		–		
Turnout		13,778	–	–
Eligible voters				
Liberal gain from Independent Liberal		Swing		–0.39
Source: Elections Ontario

1937 Ontario general election
Party	Candidate	Votes	%	±%
Independent Liberal	Morrison Mann MacBride	8,094	53.71	+3.54
Conservative	R. W. McFadden	5,492	36.45	–1.62
Co-operative Commonwealth	Leonard R. Lear	1,483	9.84	–1.92
Total valid votes		15,069	99.02	
Total rejected ballots		149	0.98	–0.11
Turnout		15,218	72.14	–9.41
Eligible voters		21,094		
Independent Liberal gain from Independent		Swing		+2.58
Source: Elections Ontario

1934 Ontario general election
Party	Candidate	Votes	%	±%
Independent	Morrison Mann MacBride	8,349	50.17	–
Conservative	William Martin	6,335	38.07	–19.85
Co-operative Commonwealth	William John Cowherd	1,958	11.77	–
Total valid votes		16,642	98.91	
Total rejected ballots		184	1.09	–
Turnout		16,826	81.55	–
Eligible voters		20,633		
Independent gain from Conservative		Swing		+0.00
Source: Elections Ontario

Ontario provincial by-election, October 18, 1930 Ministerial by-election
Party	Candidate	Votes
Conservative	William Martin	acclaimed
Source: Elections Ontario

1929 Ontario general election
Party	Candidate	Votes	%	±%
Conservative	William Martin	7,740	57.93	+2.20
Liberal	Ernest Russell Read	5,621	42.07	–2.20
Total valid votes		13,361	99.42	
Total rejected ballots		78	0.58	+0.14
Turnout		13,439	65.98	–5.13
Eligible voters		20,368		
Conservative hold		Swing		+2.20
Source: Elections Ontario

1926 Ontario general election
Party	Candidate	Votes	%
Conservative	William Martin	7,751	55.73
Liberal	Ernest Russell Read	6,156	44.27
Total valid votes		13,907	99.56
Total rejected ballots		61	0.44
Turnout		13,968	71.11
Eligible voters		19,642	
Conservative pickup new district.			
Source: Elections Ontario
