= Gerald Hagey =

Canadian businessman, academic, and college president

Joseph Gerald "Gerry" Hagey CM

President of the University of Waterloo
- In office 1958–1969
- Succeeded by: Howard Petch

Personal details
- Born: September 28, 1904 Hamilton, Ontario
- Died: October 26, 1988 (aged 84)

Joseph Gerald Hagey (September 28, 1904 – October 26, 1988) was a Canadian businessman, academic, and a founder and first president of the University of Waterloo in Waterloo, Ontario.

== Biography ==
Hagey was born and raised in Hamilton, Ontario, the son of Menno Hagey (1863-1946) and Esther Cornell (1861-1907). In 1928 he received a B.A. from Waterloo College, at that time a small church college affiliated with the University of Western Ontario. After graduation, he took a job in sales for B.F. Goodrich, a Kitchener-based rubber company. By the 1950s he had become an advertising and public relations manager, though throughout this time he had continued to be involved in the affairs of his alma mater, Waterloo College.

In 1953 he left B.F. Goodrich to become the president of Waterloo College. The 1950s and 1960s saw a massive expansion in industry and academia because of the postwar economic boom and because of the impending arrival of the baby boomers at Canadian universities. Hagey's goal was the transformation of Waterloo College into a university with a particular focus on science and technology, and close links with industry through co-operative education.

This idea proved somewhat controversial, and Hagey ultimately became the founding president of the University of Waterloo in 1957, when the science and engineering faculties he had established broke away from the rest of Waterloo College, which later became Wilfrid Laurier University.

He retired in 1969 after the removal of his larynx due to cancer. When Hagey retired he had helped the University of Waterloo grow from 75 students in two portable classrooms to a rambling campus worth $80 million and a student population of 9,000. A building on the UW campus, the J.G. Hagey Hall of the Humanities, is named in his honour.

In 1967 he received an honorary doctorate from Sir George Williams University, which later became Concordia University.

In April 1986, he was invested as a member into the Order of Canada.

Hagey was the great-grandson of Mennonite Bishop Joseph B. Hagey and the cousin of Brantford MPP Louis Hagey.

== See also ==
- List of University of Waterloo people
