= Larry Brock =

Canadian politician

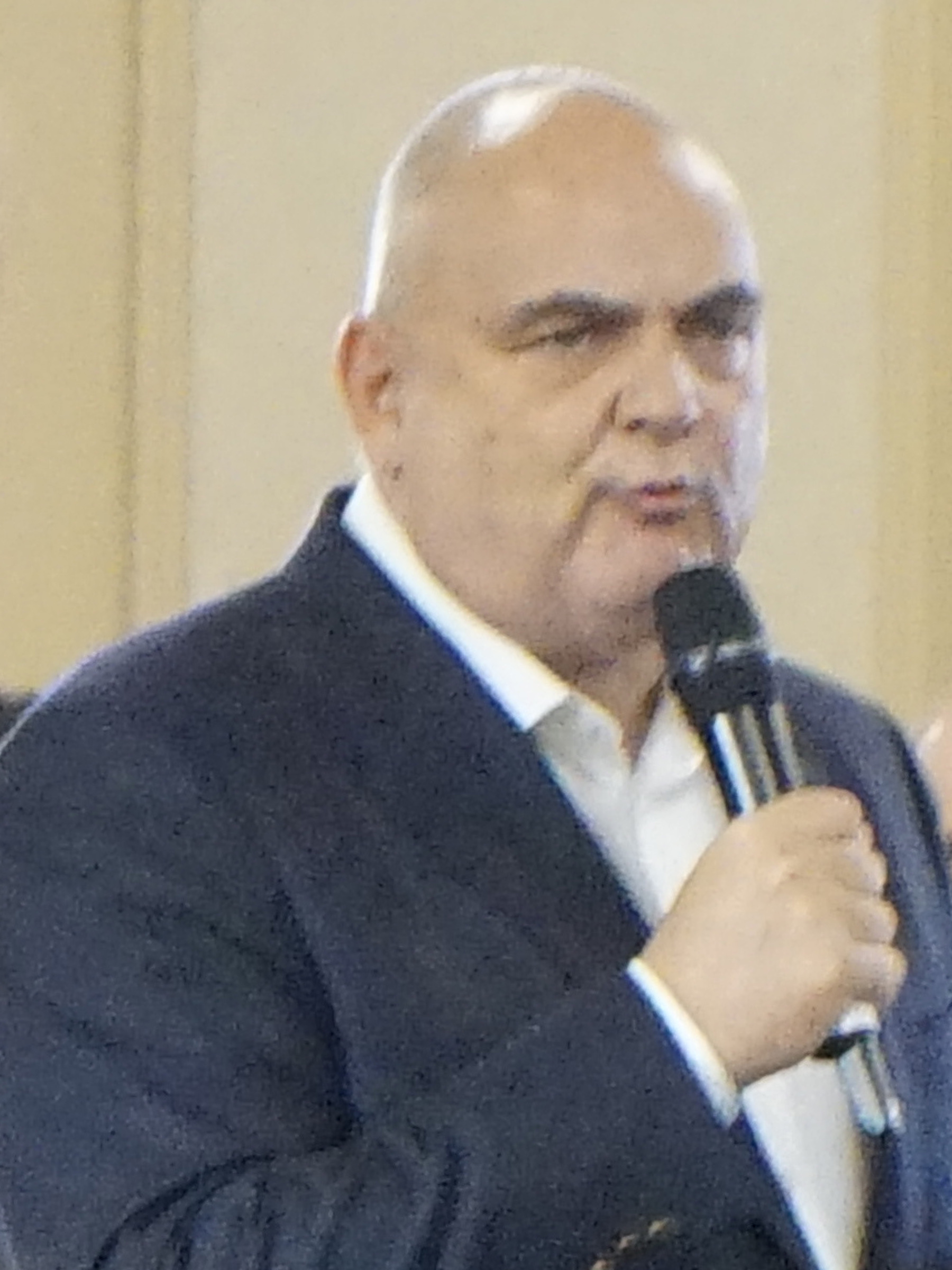
- Brock in 2023

Member of Parliament for Brantford—Brant South Brantford—Brant South—Six Nations (2025–2026) Brantford—Brant (2021–2025)
- In office September 20, 2021 – September 18, 2026
- Preceded by: Phil McColeman

Personal details
- Born: 1963 or 1964 (age 62–63) Brantford, Ontario, Canada
- Party: Conservative
- Education: University of Waterloo (BA); University of Calgary (JD)
- Occupation: Lawyer; politician

Lawrence J. Brock is a Canadian politician who was the member of Parliament for the electoral district of Brantford—Brant South in the House of Commons of Canada from 2021 to 2026 as a member of the Conservative Party.

== Biography ==
=== Early life ===
Brock was born in Brantford, Ontario in 1963 or 1964, the eldest of two children. Brock's father ran a home renovation business, while his mother was a grocery store manager.

Brock earned a Bachelor of Arts in political science at the University of Waterloo and a Bachelor of Laws at the University of Calgary.

Prior to entering politics, Brock was a lawyer, starting in private practice in 1992 before becoming the assistant Crown attorney for Brantford in 2004.

=== Political career ===
In 2021, Brock was elected to represent the electoral district of Brantford—Brant in the House of Commons of Canada in the 2021 Canadian federal election.

During his time in the House of Commons, Brock served on the Conservative frontbench as Deputy Shadow Minister for Justice and Attorney General of Canada, Associate Shadow Minister for Indigenous Services and Shadow Minister for Justice and Attorney General of Canada until stepping down from this role in June 2026. He was elected vice chair of the Canadian House of Commons Standing Committee on Justice and Human Rights in the 45th Canadian Parliament in 2025.

In August 2026, Brock announced his pending resignation from Parliament on September 18, in order to take a position at the Brantford Crown Attorney's Office.

== Personal life ==
Brock and his wife, Angela, have two daughters.

== Electoral record ==
2025 Canadian federal election: Brantford—Brant South—Six Nations
Party	Candidate	Votes	%	±%	Expenditures
Conservative	Larry Brock	34,501	52.44	+12.36	$127,957.24
Liberal	Joy O'Donnell	27,032	41.09	+13.36	$124,026.65
New Democratic	Anne Gajerski-Cauley	2,410	3.66	–16.63	$1,529.63
Green	Karleigh Csordas	1,110	1.69	–0.95	$14,780.53
People's	Nicholas Xenos	392	0.60	–8.18	$3,633.49
Independent	Mike Clancy	148	0.22	N/A	$0.00
Independent	Leslie Bory	120	0.18	N/A	$839.52
Independent	Clo Marie	80	0.12	N/A	$0.00
Total valid votes/expense limit		65,793	99.46	–	$147,446.43
Total rejected ballots		357	0.54		
Turnout		66,150	64.60		
Eligible voters		102,397			
Conservative hold		Swing		–0.50	
Source: Elections Canada

2021 Canadian federal election: Brantford—Brant
Party	Candidate	Votes	%	±%	Expenditures
Conservative	Larry Brock	26,668	40.3	+0.03	$91,953.93
Liberal	Alison Macdonald	18,784	28.4	−2.28	$39,973.63
New Democratic	Adrienne Roberts	12,950	19.6	−0.10	$24,365.86
People's	Cole Squire	5,634	8.5	+6.52	none listed
Green	Karleigh Csordas	1,760	2.7	−3.69	$13,470.80
Independent	Leslie Bory	162	0.2	+0.03	$2,672.42
Independent	John Turmel	138	0.2	−0.02	$0.00
Total valid votes		66,096	100		
Total rejected ballots		0	0	−0.74	
Turnout		66,096	59.52	−2.32	
Eligible voters		111,048			
Conservative hold		Swing		+1.16	
Source: Elections Canada
