= List of members of the Canadian House of Commons with military service (T) =

Name	Elected party	Constituency	Elected date	Military service
Onésiphore-Ernest Talbot	Liberal	Bellechasse	June 23, 1896	Militia
Gordon Taylor	Progressive Conservative	Bow River	May 22, 1979	Royal Canadian Air Force (1942-1945)
James Davis Taylor	Conservative	New Westminster	October 26, 1908	Militia (1885), Canadian Army (1916-)
John Russell Taylor	Progressive Conservative	Vancouver—Burrard	June 10, 1957	Canadian Army (1942-1946)
Roger-Joseph Teillet	Liberal	St. Boniface	June 18, 1962	Royal Canadian Air Force (1939-1945)
Ray Thomas	Social Credit	Wetaskiwin	June 27, 1949	Royal Canadian Navy (1940-1945)
William Howell Arthur Thomas	Progressive Conservative	Middlesex West	June 10, 1957	Canadian Army
Alfred Thompson	Conservative	Yukon	November 3, 1904	Canadian Army (1916-1918)
Alfred Burke Thompson	Conservative	Simcoe East	October 29, 1925	Militia (1885)
Andrew Thorburn Thompson	Liberal	Haldimand and Monck	November 7, 1900	Canadian Army (1916-)
Benjamin Cope "Ben" Thompson	Progressive Conservative	Northumberland	June 10, 1957	Canadian Army (1943-1946)
David Thompson	Liberal	Haldimand	September 20, 1867	Militia
John Hall Thompson	Liberal	Ontario North	September 20, 1867	Militia (1869-1880)
Myron Thompson	Reform	Wild Rose	October 25, 1993	United States Army (1958-1960)
Robert Norman Thompson	Social Credit	Red Deer	June 18, 1962	Royal Canadian Air Force (1941-1943)
Walter Thomson	Liberal	Ontario	June 27, 1949	Canadian Army
Joseph Thorarinn Thorson	Liberal	Winnipeg South Centre	September 14, 1926	British Army (1916-1919)
Richard Devere Thrasher	Progressive Conservative	Essex South	June 10, 1957	Royal Canadian Air Force
Harold Aberdeen Watson Timmins	Progressive Conservative	Parkdale	October 21, 1946	Canadian Army (1916-1918)
David Tisdale	Conservative	Norfolk South	February 22, 1887	Militia (1866-1874)
Donald Ross Tolmie	Liberal	Welland	November 8, 1965	Royal Canadian Air Force (1942-1945)
William Rae Tomlinson	Liberal	Bruce	October 14, 1935	Canadian Army
Thomas Gordon Towers	Progressive Conservative	Red Deer	October 30, 1972	Canadian Forces Land Force Command
Hadley Brown Tremain	Conservative	Hants	September 21, 1911	Canadian Army (1915-1918)
Jacques Raymond Tremblay	Liberal	Richelieu—Verchères	May 29, 1967	Canadian Army (1943-1945)
Léonard-David Sweezey Tremblay	Liberal	Dorchester	October 14, 1935	Canadian Army
Joseph John Tucker	Liberal	City and County of St. John	June 23, 1896	Militia (1893-1897)
Walter Adam Tucker	Liberal	Rosthern	October 14, 1935	Canadian Army (1942-1944)
James Gray Turgeon	Liberal	Cariboo	October 14, 1935	Canadian Army
Richard Tyrwhitt	Conservative	Simcoe South	February 16, 1882	Militia (1886-)
