= Earl Catherwood =

Canadian politician

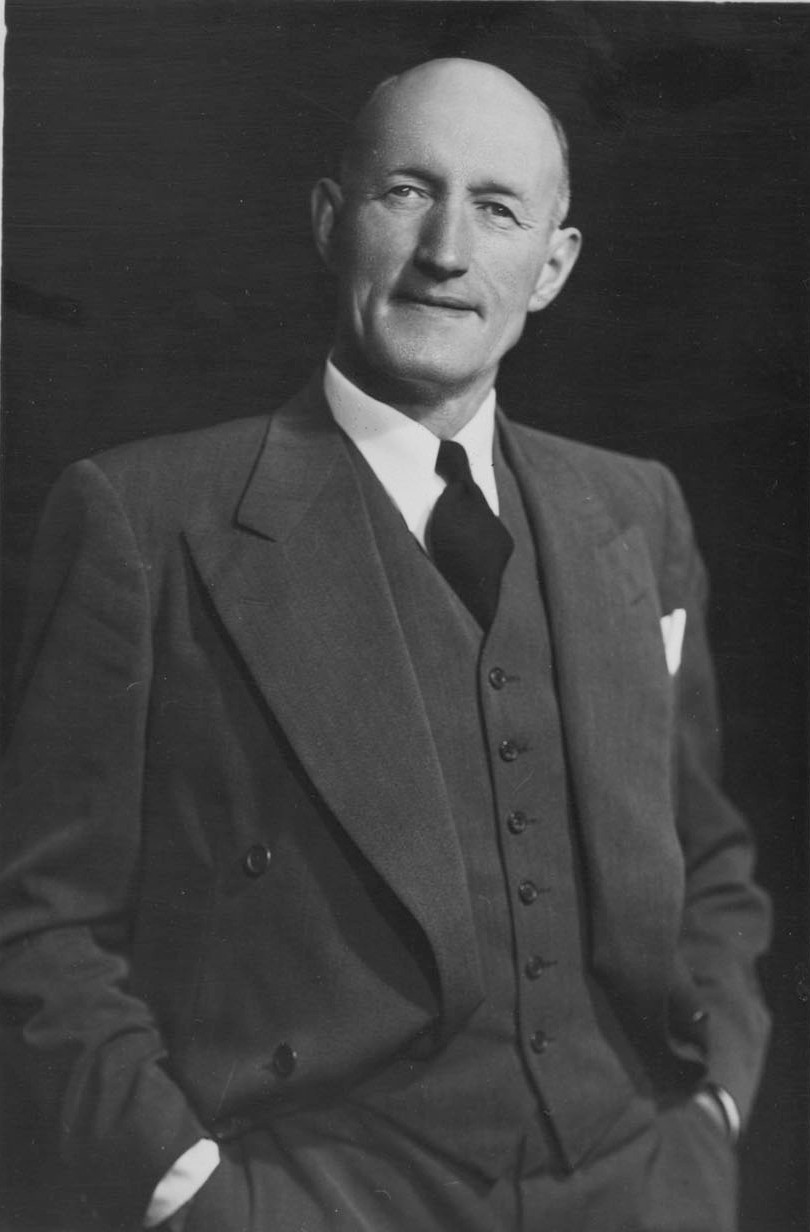

Member of Parliament for Haldimand
- In office June 1949 – June 1953
- Preceded by: Mark Cecil Senn
- Succeeded by: riding dissolved

Personal details
- Born: Albert Earl Catherwood; 23 May 1900 Hagersville, Ontario, Canada
- Died: 25 March 1988 (aged 87) Hagersville, Ontario, Canada
- Party: Progressive Conservative
- Spouse(s): Violet Smith m. 3 April 1940
- Profession: farmer

Albert Earl Catherwood (23 May 1900 – 25 March 1988) was a Canadian politician and farmer. Catherwood served as a Progressive Conservative party member of the House of Commons of Canada. Born in Hagersville, Ontario, he was a farmer by career. He was also reeve of Walpole Township, Ontario in 1947 after being a councillor there from 1935 to 1943.

He was first elected to Parliament at the Haldimand riding in the 1949 general election. When the riding was dissolved in 1952, Catherwood did not seek re-election in the new Brant—Haldimand riding but instead let John Charlton stand as the Progressive Conservative candidate for the 1953 election. He died aged 87 in 1988 at West Haldimand General Hospital, where he had resided since 1986.
