= Deans, Ontario =

Deans, Ontario, may refer to various places in Ontario, Canada:

- Deans, a ghost town in the township of Laurier in the Unorganized North East Parry Sound District
- Deans Township, Ontario, a geographic township in Sudbury District
- Deans, another name for Indiana, Ontario, a ghost town in Seneca Township, Haldimand County
