= David Thompson (Canada West politician) =

Entrepreneur and political figure in Canada West

Member of the Legislative Assembly, Province of Canada, for Haldimand
- In office 1841–1851

Personal details
- Born: February 4, 1793 Stamford, Upper Canada
- Died: 1851
- Party: Reform movement
- Relatives: David Thompson (son); Andrew Thorburn Thompson (grandson)
- Occupation: Entrepreneur; shipping; landowner

Military service
- Allegiance: Upper Canada
- Branch/service: Upper Canada milita
- Rank: Lieutenant Colonel

David Thompson (February 4, 1793 – 1851) was an entrepreneur and a political figure in Canada West. He represented Haldimand in the Legislative Assembly of the Province of Canada from 1841 to 1851 as a Reformer.

== Biography ==
Thompson was born on February 4, 1793, in Stamford, Upper Canada. His father, James Thomson (or Thompson), was a Scottish Presbyterian from the town of Hawick in Roxburghshire near the Anglo-Scottish border. James had immigrated to the Niagara Peninsula in 1785, becoming an early settler there. James was described as stern and enterprising, and he and his sons fired their own bricks to construct a brick house.

With the outbreak of the War of 1812, nineteen-year-old David enlisted in the militia, quickly becoming a sergeant in the 2nd Regiment of the Lincoln Militia. He fought at a number of conflicts along the war's Niagara Frontier, including Queenston Heights, Beaver Dams, Chippawa, Lundy's Lane (where he sustained a head wound), and Fort Erie, as well as participating in the capture of Fort Niagara. By the end of the war, he had been promoted to lieutenant as well as acting as the regimental adjutant. He continued serving in the militia, reaching the rank of captain in 1824.

Following the war, Thompson moved to Wainfleet, where he became a general businessman and merchant. He owned a general store while also acting as a miller, distiller, and lumber merchant. He was also a contractor on the first Welland Canal, where he worked for William Hamilton Merritt, managing accounts and workers' wages on the canal construction project.

Thompson had become relatively wealthy from the Welland Canal project, and saw the prospects for a similar canal development opportunity along the Grand River. With Merritt, he became a promoter and financial backer of the Grand River Navigation Company, whose mission was to canalize the river with a set of locks. When the Cayuga North Township opened for settlement in 1831, Thompson strategically purchased promising sites along the river where mills could be developed.

Thompson was involved in laying out the 1,200 acre town of Indiana. He eventually owned two sawmills, a gristmill and a carding mill, a cooperage, and a number of stores. By the mid-19th century, Indiana was the largest industrial town in Haldimand County.

In the late 1840s, Thompson cleared land and built his home on what would later be known as the Ruthven Park. The 10,000 square foot house, built in the Greek revival style, was to stay in the possession of the Thompson family until the 1990s. In 1995 it was designated a National Historic Site of Canada. In 1996, the Ontario Heritage Trust obtained a heritage easement to protect the building.

The Province of Canada was created in 1841 from the union of Upper Canada and Lower Canada. Thompson was elected to the new Legislative Assembly as a Reformer in the general election of 1841, for the Haldimand riding. He was re-elected to the second Parliament in 1844 (by acclamation), and also to the third Parliament, in 1848. In the first Parliament, he was a supporter of the new united province, and voted in support of the government of the Governor General, Lord Sydenham. After Sydenham's death in late 1841, Thompson regularly voted with the Reformers led by Robert Baldwin. Generally a moderate and supporter of responsible government, towards the end of his third term he gave indications of more liberal tendencies than other Reformers, and criticized the financial policies of the Lafontaine–Baldwin government.

Thompson died in office in 1851. His son David represented Haldimand in the assembly for the Province of Canada and the House of Commons of Canada.
