= Brant—Haldimand =

Brant—Haldimand could refer to:

- Brant—Haldimand (federal electoral district)
- Brant—Haldimand (provincial electoral district)
