= General Montagu =

General Montagu or Montague may refer to:

- Charles Montagu (British Army officer) (died 1777), British Army lieutenant general
- John Montagu, 4th Earl of Sandwich (1718–1792), British Army general
- Thomas Montagu, 4th Earl of Salisbury (1388–1428), English Army lieutenant general
- Percival John Montague (1882–1966), Canadian Army lieutenant general
- Robert Miller Montague (1899–1958), U.S. Army lieutenant general

== See also ==
- Francis Stewart Montague-Bates, (1876–1954), British Army brigadier general
- Edward Montagu-Stuart-Wortley (1857–1934), British Army major general
- John Douglas-Scott-Montagu, 2nd Baron Montagu of Beaulieu (1866−1929), British honorary brigadier general
