= Francis Ramsey Lalor =

Canadian politician (1856–1929)

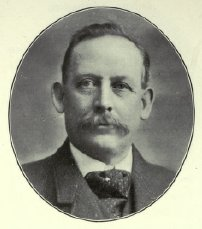

Member of the Canadian Parliament for Haldimand
- In office 1904–1921
- Preceded by: Walter Humphries Montague
- Succeeded by: Mark Senn

Personal details
- Born: November 14, 1856 St. Catharines, Canada West
- Died: June 24, 1929 (aged 72)
- Party: Conservative

Francis Ramsey Lalor (November 14, 1856 – June 24, 1929) was a Canadian politician.

Born in St. Catharines, Canada West, Lalor was educated at the Durnville Public and High Schools. A merchant and manufacturer, he was first elected to the House of Commons of Canada for the electoral district of Haldimand at the general elections of 1904. A Conservative, he was re-elected in 1908, 1911, and 1917.
