= Franklin Smoke =

Canadian politician

Member of Parliament for Brant
- In office October 1925 – October 1935
- Preceded by: William Charles Good
- Succeeded by: George Wood

Personal details
- Born: 24 August 1860 South Dumfries Township, Canada West
- Died: 27 February 1937 (aged 76)
- Party: Conservative
- Spouse(s): Mary Evaline Stockton m. 11 August 1886
- Profession: barrister

Franklin Smoke (24 August 1860 – 27 February 1937) was a Conservative member of the House of Commons of Canada. He was born in South Dumfries Township, Canada West and became a barrister.

Smoke attended public and secondary schools at Paris, Ontario then proceeded to studies at Osgoode Hall Law School. In 1908, he was appointed King's Counsel.

In the 1919 Ontario election, Smoke was an unsuccessful candidate for provincial office. His campaign for federal office in the 1925 general election was successful, winning a Parliament seat at Brant riding. He was re-elected in 1926 and 1930 then defeated by George Wood of the Liberal party in the 1935 election.

== Electoral record ==
1935 Canadian federal election: Brant
| Party | Candidate | Votes | % | ±% |
|---|---|---|---|---|
| Liberal | George Ernest Wood | 4,294 | 44.5 | -1.7 |
| Conservative | Franklin Smoke | 3,587 | 37.2 | -16.7 |
| Reconstruction | Cuthbert Mainwaring Burt | 1,277 | 13.2 | |
| Co-operative Commonwealth | William James Anderson | 494 | 5.1 | |
| Total valid votes | | 9,652 | 100.0 | |

1930 Canadian federal election: Brant
| Party | Candidate | Votes | % | ±% |
|---|---|---|---|---|
| Conservative | Franklin Smoke | 5,094 | 53.8 | +2.9 |
| Liberal | John Harold | 4,372 | 46.2 | -2.9 |
| Total valid votes | | 9,466 | 100.0 | |
Source: lop.parl.ca

1926 Canadian federal election: Brant
| Party | Candidate | Votes | % | ±% |
|---|---|---|---|---|
| Conservative | Franklin Smoke | 4,218 | 50.9 | -5.8 |
| Liberal–Progressive | Thomas Scott Davidson | 4,065 | 49.1 | +5.8 |
| Total valid votes | | 8,283 | 100.0 | |

1925 Canadian federal election: Brant
| Party | Candidate | Votes | % | ±% |
|---|---|---|---|---|
| Conservative | Franklin Smoke | 4,151 | 56.7 | +17.8 |
| Progressive | Edgar Howard Standing | 3,173 | 43.3 | +2.5 |
| Total valid votes | | 7,324 | 100.0 | |
