= Brantford—Brant (federal electoral district) =

Defunct federal electoral district in Ontario, Canada

Coordinates: 43.12°N 80.25°W

Ontario electoral district
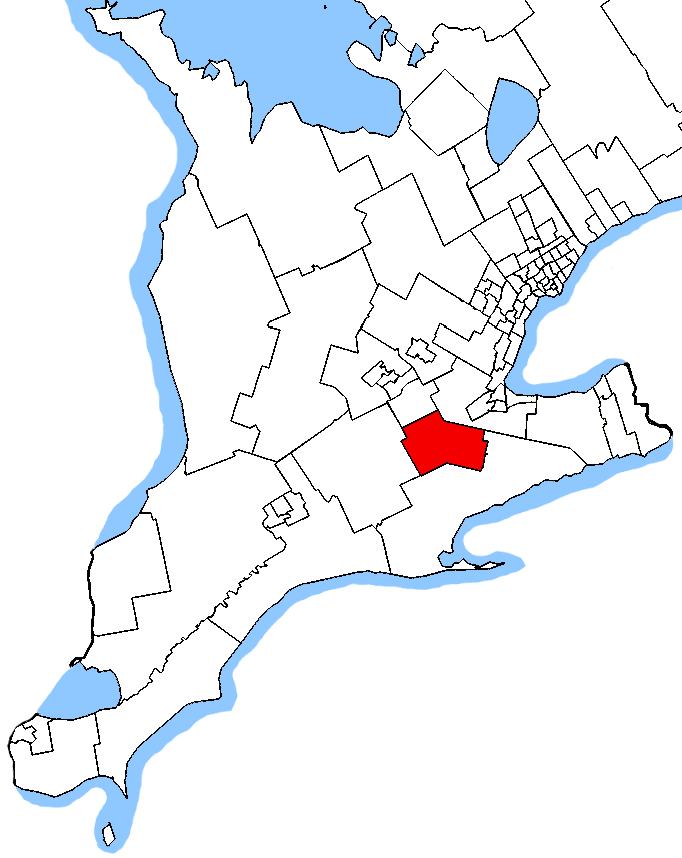
- Brantford—Brant in relation to other Ontario electoral districts (2015 boundaries)

Defunct federal electoral district
- Legislature: House of Commons
- District created: 1903
- District abolished: 2023
- First contested: 1904
- Last contested: 2021
- District webpage: profile, map

Demographics
- Population (2016): 130,296
- Electors (2015): 95,616
- Area (km²): 828.81
- Census division(s): Brant, Haldimand
- Census subdivision(s): Brantford, Brant, New Credit 40A, Six Nations 40

Brantford—Brant is a former federal electoral district in Ontario, Canada, that was represented in the House of Commons of Canada from 1904 to 1949 and from 1968 to 2025.

Prior to the 2015 election, the riding was known as Brant.

In the 2025 election it was replaced by Brantford—Brant South—Six Nations.

== History ==
The federal riding was first created in 1903 from parts of Brant South riding. It consisted of the County of Brant, excluding parts included in the Brantford riding.

In 1924, it was defined as consisting of the townships of Burford, South Dumfries, Onondaga, Tuscarora the part of the township of Brantford lying east of the Grand River, and the part of the city of Brantford not included in the electoral district of Brantford City. In 1933, it was expanded to include the town of Paris.

The federal electoral district was abolished in 1947 when it was redistributed between Brant—Wentworth and Brantford ridings.

The federal riding was recreated in 1966 from parts of Brant—Haldimand, Brantford and Haldimand—Norfolk—Brant ridings. It consisted initially of the County of Brant, and the Six Nations and New Credit Indian reserves.

In 1976, it was defined as consisting of the County of Brant. In 1987, it was defined as consisting of the City of Brantford, the Town of Paris, and the townships of Brantford and South Dumfries. In 2003, it was redefined as using the 1966 definition.

Brant was largely incorporated into the new riding of Brantford—Brant, with small territories going to Oxford and Cambridge during the 2012 electoral redistribution.

== Demographics ==
According to the 2021 Canadian census

Languages: 85.5% English, 1.8% Punjabi, 1.1% Polish
Religions: 53.1% Christian (22.0% Catholic, 5.6% Anglican, 5.5% United Church, 2.7% Baptist, 1.7% Presbyterian, 1.6% Pentecostal, 1.0% Reformed, 13.0% Other), 2.2% Sikh, 1.8% Muslim, 1.4% Hindu, 40.0% None
Median income: $40,800 (2020)
Average income: $49,800 (2020)

Panethnic groups in Brantford—Brant (2011−2021)
Panethnic group	2021		2016		2011	
Panethnic group	Pop.	%	Pop.	%	Pop.	%
European (Note: Statistic includes all persons that did not make up part of a visible minority or an indigenous identity.)	112,840	81.74%	110,590	86.57%	110,380	84.74%
South Asian	7,065	5.12%	3,315	2.6%	1,735	1.33%
Indigenous	6,890	4.99%	6,935	5.43%	12,555	9.64%
African	4,200	3.04%	2,235	1.75%	1,675	1.29%
Southeast Asian (Note: Statistic includes total responses of "Filipino" and "Southeast Asian" under visible minority section on census.)	2,605	1.89%	1,890	1.48%	1,245	0.96%
East Asian (Note: Statistic includes total responses of "Chinese", "Korean", and "Japanese" under visible minority section on census.)	1,215	0.88%	1,245	0.97%	1,175	0.9%
Middle Eastern (Note: Statistic includes total responses of "West Asian" and "Arab" under visible minority section on census.)	1,015	0.74%	505	0.4%	675	0.52%
Latin American	1,100	0.8%	495	0.39%	420	0.32%
Other/multiracial (Note: Statistic includes total responses of "Visible minority, n.i.e." and "Multiple visible minorities" under visible minority section on census.)	1,130	0.82%	540	0.42%	390	0.3%
Total responses	138,050	98.51%	127,740	98.04%	130,260	98.35%
Total population	140,139	100%	130,296	100%	132,443	100%
Notes: Totals greater than 100% due to multiple origin responses. Demographics based on 2012 Canadian federal electoral redistribution riding boundaries.

== Members of Parliament ==
This riding has elected the following members of Parliament:

Parliament	Years	Member	Party
Brant; Riding created from Brant South, Wentworth North and Brant, and Oxford South
10th	1904–1908	William Paterson	Liberal
11th	1908–1911	William Paterson	Liberal
12th	1911–1917	John Henry Fisher	Conservative
13th	1917–1921	John Harold	Government (Liberal–Unionist)
14th	1921–1925	William Charles Good	Progressive
15th	1925–1926	Franklin Smoke	Conservative
16th	1926–1930	Franklin Smoke	Conservative
17th	1930–1935	Franklin Smoke	Conservative
18th	1935–1940	George Wood	Liberal
19th	1940–1945	George Wood	Liberal
20th	1945–1949	John A. Charlton	Progressive Conservative
Riding dissolved into Brant—Wentworth and Brantford
Brant; Riding re-created from Brant—Haldimand and Brantford
28th	1968–1971	James Elisha Brown	Liberal
28th	1971–1972	Derek Blackburn	New Democratic
29th	1972–1974	Derek Blackburn	New Democratic
30th	1974–1979	Derek Blackburn	New Democratic
31st	1979–1980	Derek Blackburn	New Democratic
32nd	1980–1984	Derek Blackburn	New Democratic
33rd	1984–1988	Derek Blackburn	New Democratic
34th	1988–1993	Derek Blackburn	New Democratic
35th	1993–1997	Jane Stewart	Liberal
36th	1997–2000	Jane Stewart	Liberal
37th	2000–2004	Jane Stewart	Liberal
38th	2004–2006	Lloyd St. Amand	Liberal
39th	2006–2008	Lloyd St. Amand	Liberal
40th	2008–2011	Phil McColeman	Conservative
41st	2011–2015	Phil McColeman	Conservative
Brantford—Brant
42nd	2015–2019	Phil McColeman	Conservative
43rd	2019–2021	Phil McColeman	Conservative
44th	2021–2025	Larry Brock	Conservative
Riding dissolved into Brantford—Brant South—Six Nations and Flamborough—Glanbrook—Brant North

== Election results ==
=== Brantford—Brant, 2015–present ===
Graph of election results in Brantford—Brant (2011-, minor parties that never received 2% of the vote or did not run consistently are omitted)

2021 Canadian federal election
Party	Candidate	Votes	%	±%	Expenditures
Conservative	Larry Brock	26,668	40.3	+0.03	$91,953.93
Liberal	Alison Macdonald	18,784	28.4	-2.28	$39,973.63
New Democratic	Adrienne Roberts	12,950	19.6	-0.10	$24,365.86
People's	Cole Squire	5,634	8.5	+6.52	none listed
Green	Karleigh Csordas	1,760	2.7	-3.69	$13,470.80
Independent	Leslie Bory	162	0.2	+0.03	$2,672.42
Independent	John Turmel	138	0.2	-0.02	$0.00
Total valid votes		66,096	100		
Total rejected ballots		0	0	-0.74	
Turnout		66,096	59.52	-2.32	
Eligible voters		111,048			
Conservative hold		Swing		+1.16	
Source: Elections Canada

2019 Canadian federal election
Party	Candidate	Votes	%	±%	Expenditures
Conservative	Phil McColeman	26,849	40.27	-0.62	$85,964.44
Liberal	Danielle Takacs	20,454	30.68	-0.01	$112,425.11
New Democratic	Sabrina Sawyer	13,131	19.70	-5.14	$10,388.48
Green	Bob Jonkman	4,257	6.39	+3.89	none listed
People's	Dave Wrobel	1,320	1.98	–	none listed
Veterans Coalition	Jeffrey Gallagher	394	0.59	–	none listed
Independent	John Turmel	146	0.22	-0.04	$0.00
Independent	Leslie Bory	115	0.17	–	$2,115.19
Total valid votes/expense limit		66,666	99.26		
Total rejected ballots		497	0.74	+0.31	
Turnout		67,163	61.84	-3.39	
Eligible voters		108,602			
Conservative hold		Swing		-0.30	
Source: Elections Canada

2015 Canadian federal election
Party	Candidate	Votes	%	±%	Expenditures
Conservative	Phil McColeman	25,874	40.89	-7.52	$141,798.50
Liberal	Danielle Takacs	19,422	30.70	+11.80	$76,160.00
New Democratic	Marc Laferriere	15,715	24.84	-4.11	$65,824.80
Green	Kevin Brandt	1,582	2.50	-0.70	$6,475.96
Libertarian	Rob Ferguson	515	0.81	–	–
Independent	John C. Turmel	164	0.26	–	–
Total valid votes/expense limit		63,272	99.57		$241,022.79
Total rejected ballots		272	0.43	–	
Turnout		63,544	65.23	–	
Eligible voters		97,409			
Conservative hold		Swing		-9.66	
Source: Elections Canada

2011 federal election redistributed results
Party	Vote	%
Conservative	26,668	48.41
New Democratic	15,946	28.95
Liberal	10,411	18.90
Green	1,756	3.20
Others	295	0.54

=== Brant, 1968–2015 ===
Graph of election results in Brant (1968-2011, minor parties that never got 2% of the vote or didn't run consistently are omitted)

2011 Canadian federal election: Brant
Party	Candidate	Votes	%	±%	Expenditures
Conservative	Phil McColeman	28,045	48.9	+7.0	–
New Democratic	Marc Laferriere	16,351	28.5	+11.3	–
Liberal	Lloyd St. Amand	10,780	18.8	-14.2	–
Green	Nora Fueten	1,858	3.2	-3.8	–
Independent	Leslie Bory	174	0.3	–	–
Independent	Martin Sitko	138	0.2	–	–
Total valid votes		57,346	100.0	–	
Total rejected ballots		243	0.4	–	
Turnout		57,589	60.1	–	
Eligible voters		94,485	–	–	

2008 Canadian federal election: Brant
Party	Candidate	Votes	%	±%	Expenditures
Conservative	Phil McColeman	22,628	41.9	+5.9	$84,126
Liberal	Lloyd St. Amand	17,839	33.0	-3.9	$82,233
New Democratic	Brian Van Tilborg	9,297	17.2	-4.1	$22,079
Green	Nora Fueten	3,805	7.0	+2.4	$15,692
Christian Heritage	John Gots	369	0.6	-0.3	$286
Total valid votes/expense limit		53,938	100	$94,138	

2006 Canadian federal election: Brant
Party	Candidate	Votes	%	±%	Expenditures
Liberal	Lloyd St. Amand	22,077	36.9	-1.1	$73,699
Conservative	Phil McColeman	21,495	36.0	+2.9	$84,866
New Democratic	Lynn Bowering	12,713	21.3	-0.7	$30,536
Green	Adam King	2,729	4.6	-0.5	$4,293
Christian Heritage	John H. Wubs	526	0.9	-0.2	
Independent	John Turmel	213	0.4	-0.3	
Total valid votes/expense limit		59,753	100.00	–	$86,871
Total rejected ballots		236			
Turnout		59,753	65.03	+4.75	
Electors on the lists		91,872			
Sources: Official Results, Elections Canada and Financial Returns, Elections Canada.

2004 Canadian federal election: Brant
Party	Candidate	Votes	%	±%	Expenditures
Liberal	Lloyd St. Amand	20,455	38.05	−17.44	$70,476
Conservative	Greg Martin	17,792	33.10	−2.14	$51,935
New Democratic	Lynn Bowering	11,826	22.00	+14.80	$19,055
Green	Helen-Anne Embry	2,738	5.09	+4.05	$1,800
Christian Heritage	Barra L. Gots	570	1.06		$759
Independent	John Turmel	373	0.69		none listed
Total valid votes		53,754	100.00		
Total rejected ballots		303			
Turnout		54,057	60.28	+4.70	
Electors on the lists		89,675			
Percentage change figures are factored for redistribution. Conservative Party percentages are contrasted with the combined Canadian Alliance and Progressive Conservative percentages from 2000.
Sources: Official Results, Elections Canada and Financial Returns, Elections Canada.

2000 Canadian federal election: Brant
Party	Candidate	Votes	%	±%	Expenditures
Liberal	Jane Stewart	24,068	56.42	–	$46,551
Alliance	Chris Cattle	10,955	25.68		$43,139
Progressive Conservative	Stephen Kun	3,580	8.39		$6,405
New Democratic	Dee Chisholm	3,126	7.33		$9,266
Green	Graeme Dunn	484	1.13		$156
Canadian Action	Mike Clancy	447	1.05		$8,881
Total valid votes/expense limit		42,660	100.00		
Total rejected ballots		262			
Turnout		42,922	56.28		
Electors on the lists		76,270			
Sources: Official Results, Elections Canada and Financial Returns, Elections Canada.

1997 Canadian federal election: Brant
Party	Candidate	Votes	%	±%
Liberal	Jane Stewart	24,125	53.0	+1.5
Reform	Dan Houssar	10,436	22.9	-1.8
Progressive Conservative	Stephen W. Kun	5,781	12.7	+0.5
New Democratic	Pat Franklin	5,201	11.4	+4.5
Total valid votes		45,543	100.0	

1993 Canadian federal election: Brant
Party	Candidate	Votes	%	±%	Expenditures
Liberal	Jane Stewart	24,686	51.46	–	$39,023
Reform	Ken Edmison	11,863	24.73		$36,354
Progressive Conservative	Mabel E. Dougherty	5,831	12.16		$25,624
New Democratic	Michael C. Smith	3,317	6.92		$37,911
National	Herman Kruis	1,227	2.56		$8,148
Green	Jamie Legacey	482	1.00		$0
Libertarian	Helmut Kurmis	258	0.54		$0
Natural Law	Eleanor Toshiko Hyodo	192	0.40		$2,853
Social Credit	Doug Stelpstra	112	0.23		$158
Total valid votes		47,968	100.00		
Total rejected ballots		500			
Turnout		48,468	65.27		
Electors on the lists		74,260			
Source: Thirty-fifth General Election, 1993: Official Voting Results, Published by the Chief Electoral Officer of Canada. Financial figures taken from official contributions and expenses provided by Elections Canada.

1988 Canadian federal election: Brant
Party	Candidate	Votes	%	Expenditures
New Democratic	Derek Blackburn	19,633	41.46	$41,490
Progressive Conservative	Steve Bosanac	14,084	29.74	$45,061
Liberal	David J. Carll	11,461	24.20	$40,772
Christian Heritage	Geraldine de Vries	1,786	3.77	$10,857
Green	Jamie Legacey	258	0.54	$0
Libertarian	Helmut Kurmis	95	0.20	$299
Commonwealth of Canada	Barnabas Simon	34	0.07	$0
Total valid votes		47,351	100.00	
Total rejected ballots		287		
Turnout		47,638	71.53	
Electors on the lists		66,603		

1984 Canadian federal election: Brant
Party	Candidate	Votes	%	±%
New Democratic	Derek Blackburn	23,103	44.20	
Progressive Conservative	Rick Sterne	21,679	41.47	
Liberal	Peter Hexamer	7,286	13.94	
Social Credit	Charley Harris	207	0.40	
Total valid votes		52,275	100.00	
Total rejected ballots		266		
Turnout		52,541	73.16	
Electors on the lists		71,821		

1980 Canadian federal election: Brant
Party	Candidate	Votes	%	±%
New Democratic	Derek Blackburn	19,194	41.1	-1.1
Progressive Conservative	Rick Sterne	14,614	31.3	+0.2
Liberal	Jo Brennan	12,725	27.2	+0.7
Social Credit	Winnifred M. Moyer	103	0.2	
Marxist–Leninist	Malkit Randhawa	93	0.2	0.0
Total valid votes		46,729	100.0	
lop.parl.ca

1979 Canadian federal election: Brant
Party	Candidate	Votes	%	±%
New Democratic	Derek Blackburn	20,908	42.2	+0.1
Progressive Conservative	Arthur Tobey	15,422	31.1	+11.2
Liberal	Jack Bawcutt	13,154	26.5	-11.1
Marxist–Leninist	Malkit Randhawa	93	0.2	
Total valid votes		49,577	100.0	

1974 Canadian federal election: Brant
Party	Candidate	Votes	%	±%
New Democratic	Derek Blackburn	19,453	42.1	-1.0
Liberal	Vern Young	17,410	37.6	+5.9
Progressive Conservative	Alex Keresturi	9,228	20.0	-5.3
Communist	Paul F. Jarbeau	158	0.3	
Total valid votes		46,249	100.0	
lop.parl.ca

1972 Canadian federal election: Brant
Party	Candidate	Votes	%	±%
New Democratic	Derek Blackburn	20,002	43.1	0.0
Liberal	Dick Mundy	14,730	31.7	-0.5
Progressive Conservative	Alex Keresturi	11,711	25.2	+1.3
Total valid votes		46,443	100.0	

By-election on May 31, 1971
Party	Candidate	Votes	%	±%
New Democratic	Derek Blackburn	17,147	43.1	+12.4
Liberal	Bob McIntosh	12,831	32.2	-7.6
Progressive Conservative	Emory Knill	9,517	23.9	-5.7
Social Credit	A.J. Sid Hamelin	322	0.8	
Total valid votes		39,817	100.0	

1968 Canadian federal election: Brant
Party	Candidate	Votes	%
Liberal	James Elisha Brown	16,029	39.8
New Democratic	Derek Blackburn	12,333	30.6
Progressive Conservative	Geoff Styles	11,901	29.6
Total valid votes		40,263	100.0

=== Brant, 1904–1949 ===
Graph of election results in Brant (1904-1949, minor parties that never got 2% of the vote or didn't run consistently are omitted)

1945 Canadian federal election: Brant
Party	Candidate	Votes	%	±%
Progressive Conservative	John Alpheus Charlton	5,005	45.3	-3.9
Liberal	George Ernest Wood	4,800	43.5	-7.3
Co-operative Commonwealth	Charles William Ward	1,235	11.2	
Total valid votes		11,040	100.0	

1940 Canadian federal election: Brant
Party	Candidate	Votes	%	±%
Liberal	George Wood	4,657	50.8	+6.3
National Government	Syl Apps	4,519	49.2	+12.1
Total valid votes		9,176	100.0	

Note: "National Government" vote is compared to Conservative vote in 1935 election.

1935 Canadian federal election: Brant
Party	Candidate	Votes	%	±%
Liberal	George Ernest Wood	4,294	44.5	-1.7
Conservative	Franklin Smoke	3,587	37.2	-16.7
Reconstruction	Cuthbert Mainwaring Burt	1,277	13.2	
Co-operative Commonwealth	William James Anderson	494	5.1	
Total valid votes		9,652	100.0	

1930 Canadian federal election: Brant
Party	Candidate	Votes	%	±%
Conservative	Franklin Smoke	5,094	53.8	+2.9
Liberal	John Harold	4,372	46.2	-2.9
Total valid votes		9,466	100.0	
Source: lop.parl.ca

1926 Canadian federal election: Brant
Party	Candidate	Votes	%	±%
Conservative	Franklin Smoke	4,218	50.9	-5.8
Liberal–Progressive	Thomas Scott Davidson	4,065	49.1	+5.8
Total valid votes		8,283	100.0	

1925 Canadian federal election: Brant
Party	Candidate	Votes	%	±%
Conservative	Franklin Smoke	4,151	56.7	+17.8
Progressive	Edgar Howard Standing	3,173	43.3	+2.5
Total valid votes		7,324	100.0	

1921 Canadian federal election: Brant
Party	Candidate	Votes	%	±%
Progressive	William Charles Good	3,309	40.8	+2.0
Conservative	William Harper Reid	3,150	38.9	+0.1
Liberal	Robert John Atkin	1,645	20.3	-3.6
Total valid votes		8,104	100.0	

Note: Conservative vote is compared to Unionist vote in 1917 election, and Liberal vote is compared to Opposition vote.

1917 Canadian federal election: Brant
Party	Candidate	Votes	%	±%
Government (Liberal–Unionist)	John Harold	2,106	38.8	-13.1
Government (Conservative-Unionist)	Henry Cockshutt	2,023	37.3	
Opposition (Laurier Liberals)	Blackwell Lawrence Doran	1,299	23.9	-24.2
Total valid votes		5,428	100.0	

Note: Unionist vote is compared to Conservative vote in 1911 election.

1911 Canadian federal election: Brant
Party	Candidate	Votes	%	±%
Conservative	John Henry Fisher	1,795	51.9	+5.5
Liberal	William Paterson	1,666	48.1	-5.5
Total valid votes		3,461	100.0	

1908 Canadian federal election: Brant
Party	Candidate	Votes	%	±%
Liberal	William Paterson	1,799	53.7	-4.8
Conservative	John Patrick Noonan	1,554	46.3	
Total valid votes		3,353	100.0	

1904 Canadian federal election: Brant
Party	Candidate	Votes	%
Liberal	William Paterson	1,628	58.4
Unknown	Adam George Ludlow	1,158	41.6
Total valid votes		2,786	100.0

== See also ==
- List of Canadian electoral districts
- Historical federal electoral districts of Canada
