= Mark Senn =

Canadian politician

Member of Parliament for Haldimand
- In office December 1921 – April 1949
- Preceded by: Francis Ramsey Lalor
- Succeeded by: Earl Catherwood

Personal details
- Born: Mark Cecil Senn; 1 June 1878 Oneida, Ontario, Canada
- Died: 10 January 1951 (aged 72)
- Party: Conservative (1867–1942); Progressive Conservative
- Spouse(s): Etta May Moore m. 1899
- Profession: farmer, merchant, teacher

Mark Cecil Senn (1 June 1878 – 10 January 1951) was a Canadian farmer, merchant, teacher and politician. Senn served as a Conservative and Progressive Conservative party member of the House of Commons of Canada. He was born in Oneida, Ontario.

He was first elected to Parliament at the Haldimand riding in the 1921 general election, initially under the Conservative party. Senn was re-elected in 1925, 1926, 1930, 1935, 1940 and 1945. He did not stand for re-election in 1949 due to health problems. Senn died at his residence in Oneida Township on 10 January 1951, survived by his wife, three sons and three daughters.
