= Lloyd St. Amand =

Canadian politician

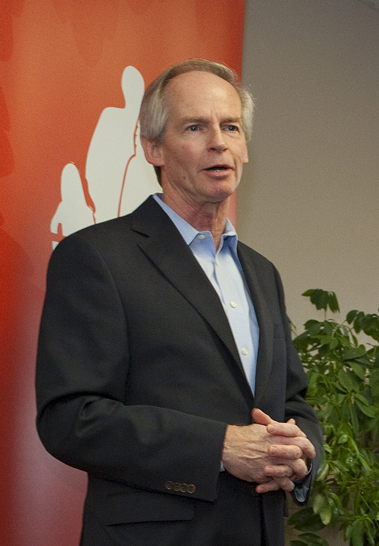
- St. Amand in 2011

Member of Parliament for Brant
- In office 2004–2008
- Preceded by: Jane Stewart
- Succeeded by: Phil McColeman

Personal details
- Born: November 10, 1952 (age 73) Sarnia, Ontario
- Party: Liberal
- Spouse: Helen Dallaway
- Profession: attorney

Lloyd St. Amand (born November 10, 1952, in Sarnia, Ontario) is a Canadian politician and a former Member of Parliament for the riding of Brant. He is a member of the Liberal Party of Canada.

Born in Sarnia, Ontario, he received his Bachelor of Arts degree from the University of Western Ontario and his law degree in 1977 from the University of Windsor.

Since 1979, St. Amand has been a resident of Brantford, Brant's most populous urban centre, where he has practiced family and criminal law. He has volunteered within the community with several organizations, including St. Joseph's Hospital, Brant Waterways Foundation, Big Brothers, Nova Vita Women's Services, and Brant United Way.

St. Amand is a past president of the Brant Federal Liberal Association and was an active supporter of Jane Stewart's successful election campaigns in 1993, 1997, and 2000. After Stewart announced she would not run for re-election in the 2004 federal election, St. Amand ran to become the Liberal candidate for her riding and succeeded. He subsequently won the riding in the 2004 election.

He chaired the House Standing Committee on Aboriginal Affairs and Northern Development from Oct. 4, 2004 - Nov. 29, 2005. He was Assistant/Associate Critic for the Environment Feb. 23, 2006 - Jan. 17, 2007.

He lost re-election in 2008 and made an unsuccessful comeback in 2011.

== Electoral record ==
2011 Canadian federal election: Brant
Party	Candidate	Votes	%	±%	Expenditures
Conservative	Phil McColeman	28,045	48.9	+7.0	–
New Democratic	Marc Laferriere	16,351	28.5	+11.3	–
Liberal	Lloyd St. Amand	10,780	18.8	-14.2	–
Green	Nora Fueten	1,858	3.2	-3.8	–
Independent	Leslie Bory	174	0.3	–	–
Independent	Martin Sitko	138	0.2	–	–
Total valid votes		57,346	100.0	–	
Total rejected ballots		243	0.4	–	
Turnout		57,589	60.1	–	
Eligible voters		94,485	–	–	

2008 Canadian federal election: Brant
Party	Candidate	Votes	%	±%	Expenditures
Conservative	Phil McColeman	22,628	41.9	+5.9	$84,126
Liberal	Lloyd St. Amand	17,839	33.0	-3.9	$82,233
New Democratic	Brian Van Tilborg	9,297	17.2	-4.1	$22,079
Green	Nora Fueten	3,805	7.0	+2.4	$15,692
Christian Heritage	John Gots	369	0.6	-0.3	$286
Total valid votes/expense limit		53,938	100	$94,138	

2006 Canadian federal election: Brant
Party	Candidate	Votes	%	±%	Expenditures
Liberal	Lloyd St. Amand	22,077	36.9	-1.1	$73,699
Conservative	Phil McColeman	21,495	36.0	+2.9	$84,866
New Democratic	Lynn Bowering	12,713	21.3	-0.7	$30,536
Green	Adam King	2,729	4.6	-0.5	$4,293
Christian Heritage	John H. Wubs	526	0.9	-0.2	
Independent	John Turmel	213	0.4	-0.3	
Total valid votes/expense limit		59,753	100.00	–	$86,871
Total rejected ballots		236			
Turnout		59,753	65.03	+4.75	
Electors on the lists		91,872			
Sources: Official Results, Elections Canada and Financial Returns, Elections Canada.

2004 Canadian federal election: Brant
Party	Candidate	Votes	%	±%	Expenditures
Liberal	Lloyd St. Amand	20,455	38.05	−17.44	$70,476
Conservative	Greg Martin	17,792	33.10	−2.14	$51,935
New Democratic	Lynn Bowering	11,826	22.00	+14.80	$19,055
Green	Helen-Anne Embry	2,738	5.09	+4.05	$1,800
Christian Heritage	Barra L. Gots	570	1.06		$759
Independent	John Turmel	373	0.69		none listed
Total valid votes		53,754	100.00		
Total rejected ballots		303			
Turnout		54,057	60.28	+4.70	
Electors on the lists		89,675			
Percentage change figures are factored for redistribution. Conservative Party percentages are contrasted with the combined Canadian Alliance and Progressive Conservative percentages from 2000.
Sources: Official Results, Elections Canada and Financial Returns, Elections Canada.
