= Phil McColeman =

Canadian politician

Phil McColeman MP
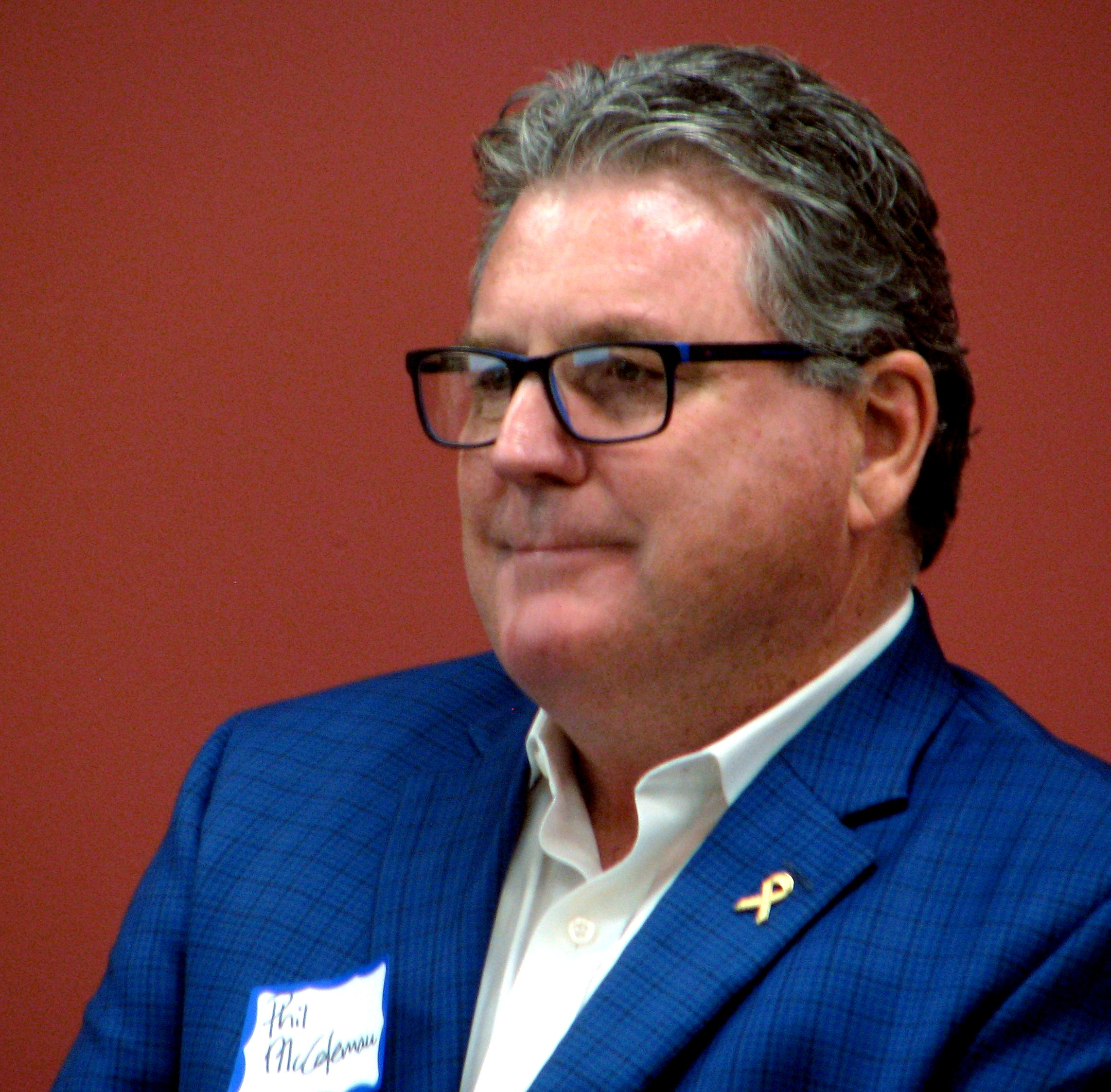
- McColeman in 2016

Official Opposition Critic for the Treasury Board
- In office October 16, 2016 – August 30, 2017
- Leader: Rona Ambrose; Andrew Scheer
- Preceded by: Pierre Poilievre
- Succeeded by: Gérard Deltell

Member of Parliament for Brantford—Brant (Brant; 2008–2015)
- In office October 14, 2008 – September 20, 2021
- Preceded by: Lloyd St. Amand
- Succeeded by: Larry Brock

Personal details
- Born: March 15, 1954 (age 72) Brantford, Ontario, Canada
- Party: Conservative
- Spouse: Nancy (August 23, 1975-present)

Phil McColeman (born March 15, 1954) is a former Canadian politician who served as a Member of Parliament (MP) from 2008 to 2021 as a member of the Conservative Party. He represented the riding of Brant from 2008 to 2015 and, following the 2012 federal electoral district redistribution, he represented the riding of Brantford—Brant from 2015 to 2021. On 8 January 2021, he announced that he would not seek re-election in the 2021 federal election.

Prior to entering politics, McColeman ran a construction business for 24 years. He is also a former president of the Brantford Homebuilders’ Association.

== Electoral record ==
2019 Canadian federal election: Brantford—Brant
Party	Candidate	Votes	%	±%	Expenditures
Conservative	Phil McColeman	26,849	40.27	-0.62	$85,964.44
Liberal	Danielle Takacs	20,454	30.68	-0.01	$112,425.11
New Democratic	Sabrina Sawyer	13,131	19.70	-5.14	$10,388.48
Green	Bob Jonkman	4,257	6.39	+3.89	none listed
People's	Dave Wrobel	1,320	1.98	–	none listed
Veterans Coalition	Jeffrey Gallagher	394	0.59	–	none listed
Independent	John Turmel	146	0.22	-0.04	$0.00
Independent	Leslie Bory	115	0.17	–	$2,115.19
Total valid votes/expense limit		66,666	99.26		
Total rejected ballots		497	0.74	+0.31	
Turnout		67,163	61.84	-3.39	
Eligible voters		108,602			
Conservative hold		Swing		-0.30	
Source: Elections Canada

2015 Canadian federal election: Brantford—Brant
Party	Candidate	Votes	%	±%	Expenditures
Conservative	Phil McColeman	25,874	40.89	-7.52	$141,798.50
Liberal	Danielle Takacs	19,422	30.70	+11.80	$76,160.00
New Democratic	Marc Laferriere	15,715	24.84	-4.11	$65,824.80
Green	Kevin Brandt	1,582	2.50	-0.70	$6,475.96
Libertarian	Rob Ferguson	515	0.81	–	–
Independent	John C. Turmel	164	0.26	–	–
Total valid votes/expense limit		63,272	99.57		$241,022.79
Total rejected ballots		272	0.43	–	
Turnout		63,544	65.23	–	
Eligible voters		97,409			
Conservative hold		Swing		-9.66	
Source: Elections Canada

2011 Canadian federal election: Brant
Party	Candidate	Votes	%	±%	Expenditures
Conservative	Phil McColeman	28,045	48.9	+7.0	–
New Democratic	Marc Laferriere	16,351	28.5	+11.3	–
Liberal	Lloyd St. Amand	10,780	18.8	-14.2	–
Green	Nora Fueten	1,858	3.2	-3.8	–
Independent	Leslie Bory	174	0.3	–	–
Independent	Martin Sitko	138	0.2	–	–
Total valid votes		57,346	100.0	–	
Total rejected ballots		243	0.4	–	
Turnout		57,589	60.1	–	
Eligible voters		94,485	–	–	

2008 Canadian federal election: Brant
Party	Candidate	Votes	%	±%	Expenditures
Conservative	Phil McColeman	22,628	41.9	+5.9	$84,126
Liberal	Lloyd St. Amand	17,839	33.0	-3.9	$82,233
New Democratic	Brian Van Tilborg	9,297	17.2	-4.1	$22,079
Green	Nora Fueten	3,805	7.0	+2.4	$15,692
Christian Heritage	John Gots	369	0.6	-0.3	$286
Total valid votes/expense limit		53,938	100	$94,138	

2006 Canadian federal election: Brant
Party	Candidate	Votes	%	±%	Expenditures
Liberal	Lloyd St. Amand	22,077	36.9	-1.1	$73,699
Conservative	Phil McColeman	21,495	36.0	+2.9	$84,866
New Democratic	Lynn Bowering	12,713	21.3	-0.7	$30,536
Green	Adam King	2,729	4.6	-0.5	$4,293
Christian Heritage	John H. Wubs	526	0.9	-0.2	
Independent	John Turmel	213	0.4	-0.3	
Total valid votes/expense limit		59,753	100.00	–	$86,871
Total rejected ballots		236			
Turnout		59,753	65.03	+4.75	
Electors on the lists		91,872			
Sources: Official Results, Elections Canada and Financial Returns, Elections Canada.
