= George Wood (Canadian politician) =

Canadian politician

Member of Parliament for Brant
- In office October 1935 – June 1945
- Preceded by: Franklin Smoke
- Succeeded by: John A. Charlton

Personal details
- Born: George Ernest Wood; 6 October 1888 Onondaga, Ontario
- Died: 1 August 1966 (aged 77)
- Party: Liberal
- Spouse(s): Myrtle Irene Shaver m. 3 June 1914
- Profession: farmer

George Ernest Wood (6 October 1888 – 1 August 1966) was a Liberal party member of the House of Commons of Canada. He was born in Onondaga, Ontario and became a farmer by career.

Wood attended secondary school number 4 in Onondaga. He became a regional councillor for Brant County, Ontario and also served in township and school councils.

He was first elected to Parliament at the Brant riding in the 1935 general election and re-elected there in 1940. Wood was defeated by John A. Charlton of the Progressive Conservative party in the 1945 election.

== Electoral record ==
1945 Canadian federal election: Brant
Party	Candidate	Votes	%	±%
Progressive Conservative	John Alpheus Charlton	5,005	45.3	-3.9
Liberal	George Ernest Wood	4,800	43.5	-7.3
Co-operative Commonwealth	Charles William Ward	1,235	11.2	
Total valid votes		11,040	100.0	

1940 Canadian federal election: Brant
Party	Candidate	Votes	%	±%
Liberal	George Wood	4,657	50.8	+6.3
National Government	Syl Apps	4,519	49.2	+12.1
Total valid votes		9,176	100.0	

Note: "National Government" vote is compared to Conservative vote in 1935 election.

1935 Canadian federal election: Brant
Party	Candidate	Votes	%	±%
Liberal	George Ernest Wood	4,294	44.5	-1.7
Conservative	Franklin Smoke	3,587	37.2	-16.7
Reconstruction	Cuthbert Mainwaring Burt	1,277	13.2	
Co-operative Commonwealth	William James Anderson	494	5.1	
Total valid votes		9,652	100.0	
