= Charles Wesley Colter =

Canadian politician

Charles Wesley Colter (February 26, 1846 – July 25, 1929) was a lawyer, publisher and political figure in Ontario, Canada. He represented Haldimand in the House of Commons of Canada from 1886 to 1887 and from 1889 to 1890 as a Liberal member.

== Biography ==
Colter was born in York County, New Brunswick, the son of Samuel Colter, an immigrant from Ireland, and was educated at the Sackville Academy and the University of New Brunswick. In 1869, he married Annie Folinsbee. Colter taught school in Cayuga and Dunnville for several years. In 1879, he was called to the Ontario bar. He was elected to the House of Commons in 1886 in a by-election held following the death of David Thompson but was defeated when he ran for reelection in 1887 and in an 1887 by-election held after the first election was successfully appealed. His election in 1889 was declared void and he lost the by-election which followed in 1890 to Walter Humphries Montague. Colter was unsuccessful when he ran for reelection in 1891 and again in 1921 in Elgin East.
