= Henry Cockshutt =

Canadian politician (1868–1944)

The Honourable Henry Cockshutt
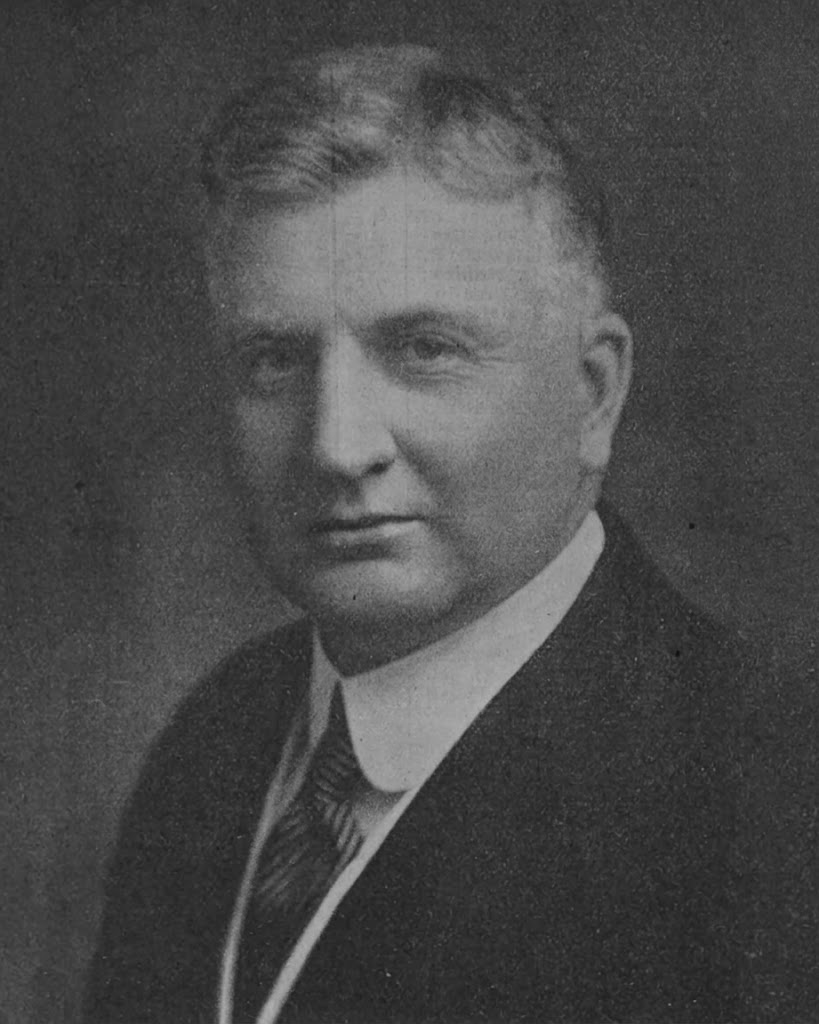
- Henry Cockshutt

13th Lieutenant Governor of Ontario
- In office September 10, 1921 – January 12, 1927
- Monarch: George V
- Governors General: The Viscount Byng of Vimy; The Viscount Willingdon
- Premier: Ernest Charles Drury; Howard Ferguson
- Preceded by: Lionel Herbert Clarke
- Succeeded by: William Donald Ross

Personal details
- Born: July 8, 1868 Brantford, Ontario
- Died: November 26, 1944 (aged 76) Brantford, Ontario, Canada
- Party: Government
- Spouse: Anna Rolls (m. 1896)
- Occupation: Businessman
- Profession: Politician

Henry "Harry" Cockshutt, (July 8, 1868 – November 26, 1944) was a Canadian businessman and politician who served as the 13th Lieutenant Governor of Ontario from 1921 until 1927.

== Early life and business career ==
Born in Brantford, Ontario on July 8, 1868, the son of Ignatius Cockshutt and Elizabeth Foster, he started working in the family business, Cockshutt Plow Company, in 1884. He worked his way up through the company, becoming the secretary-treasurer in 1888. In 1893, he became the company's managing director. In 1896, he married Isabelle Rolls. They had two daughters. In 1895, he began an international tour to drum up customers for the family business. In January 1898 he was elected president of the Brantford Board of Trade.

In 1906 he was president of the Canadian Manufacturers' Association. He became president of the Cockshutt Plow Company in 1911. After taking over, the company moved from a family-owned business to one that was publicly traded. He also began expanding the company, acquiring the Avery Wagon Company, the Brantford Carriage Company and the Frost and Wood Company Limited, using them to provide a wide range of farm implements to farmers. Cockshutt also sat on the board of directors of large corporations including the Bank of Montreal, Canadian Pacific Railway, and the Bell Telephone Company, which was special for him as he had met the founder, Alexander Graham Bell, as a child.

== Public life ==
In 1889, Cockshutt was elected to Brantford City Council as an alderman. In 1899, he was elected mayor of Brantford with a significant majority of votes for a term that lasted until 1900. In 1916, Cockshutt was given the rank of honorary colonel of the 25th Brant Dragoons. He fought during World War I with the rank of lieutenant-colonel, commanding the 215th Infantry Battalion as part of the Canadian Expeditionary Force (CEF). The unit sailed for England in 1917 and was absorbed into the 2nd Canadian Reserve Battalion. He retired from the Canadian militia in 1926.

In the 1917 federal election he ran unsuccessfully initially as the Conservative–Unionist candidate in the riding of Brant. He lost to the Liberal–Unionist candidate, John Harold, though there were voting discrepancies as Cockshutt's name was left off ballots provided to soldiers overseas with the CEF. Cockshutt demanded a recount, but after both General Andrew McNaughton, the special election authority designated by the government to oversee the soldiers' vote, and a legal decision stated they had no power to overturn the results, he withdrew his demand.

In 1921, he was appointed Lieutenant Governor of Ontario and served as King George V's representative until 1927. In his time as lieutenant governor, Cockshutt opened Government House to the public and allowed charities to use the facilities for meetings. He also used his business connections to support the development of Northern Ontario. He was given an honorary degree of law from the University of Toronto in 1923 and by the University of Western Ontario in 1924. From 1929 to 1944, he served as chancellor of the University of Western Ontario. In 1934, he retired as president of the Cockshutt Plow Company and became chairman of the board of directors, handing over the presidency to his nephew, C. Gordon Cockshutt.

He died on November 26, 1944, and is buried in the Farringdon Burial Ground, Brant County. His mansion, Dufferin House, in Brantford, became the campus for St. John's College in 1951.

== Legacy ==
Cockshutt Park, named after him, is located in West Brant, which has batting cages, a playground, and four baseball diamonds, including Arnold Anderson Stadium, home of the Brantford Red Sox.

== Electoral record ==
1917 Canadian federal election: Brant
Party	Candidate	Votes	%	±%
Government (Liberal–Unionist)	John Harold	2,106	38.8	-13.1
Government (Conservative-Unionist)	Henry Cockshutt	2,023	37.3	
Opposition (Laurier Liberals)	Blackwell Lawrence Doran	1,299	23.9	-24.2
Total valid votes		5,428	100.0	

Note: Unionist vote is compared to Conservative vote in 1911 election.

== Sources ==
- Greene, B. M., ed. (1927). Who's Who in Canada including the Possessions in the Western Hemisphere: An Illustrated Biographical Record of Men and Women of the Time (Diamond Jubilee of Confederation ed.). Toronto: International Press Limited.
- The Directory of Directors. London: Thomas Skinner & Co. 1927.

Government offices
Preceded by Lionel Herbert Clarke	Lieutenant Governor of Ontario; 1921–1927	Succeeded by William Donald Ross
Academic offices
Preceded by W. J. Roche	Chancellor of the University of Western Ontario; 1929–1944	Succeeded by Howard Ferguson
