= Jane Stewart (politician) =

Canadian politician (born 1955)

The Honourable Jane Stewart PC

Member of the Canadian Parliament for Brant
- In office October 25, 1993 – June 28, 2004
- Preceded by: Derek Blackburn
- Succeeded by: Lloyd St. Amand

Personal details
- Born: April 25, 1955 (age 70) Brantford, Ontario, Canada
- Party: Liberal
- Relations: Robert Nixon, father; Harry Nixon, grandfather
- Children: 2
- Cabinet: Minister of National Revenue (1996–1997); Minister of Indian Affairs and Northern Development (1997–1999); Minister of Human Resources Development (1999–2003)

Jane Stewart, PC (born April 25, 1955) is a Canadian politician who was the Minister of Human Resources Development from 1999 to 2003. She joined International Labour Organization in May 2004 and was the Special Representative and Director of the International Labour Organization's office to the United Nations until January 2016.

== Life and career ==
Born in Brantford, on April 25, 1955, Stewart was first elected to Parliament in the 1993 election. She was a friend of Prime Minister Jean Chrétien, and was soon appointed to the important position of Minister of National Revenue and subsequently Minister of Indian Affairs. In 1999, she was moved to the Department of Human Resources Development (HRDC), the government department that had the largest budget.

Stewart was the minister when the opposition alleged a so-called "billion-dollar boondoggle", where ineffective accounting practices at HRDC allegedly left millions of dollars unaccounted for. While the problems at HRDC mostly date from the time of her predecessor, Pierre Pettigrew, Stewart took the brunt of the attack but was also the Minister widely viewed to have cleaned up the mess left behind by her predecessor. She did not resign, and Chrétien stood by her throughout the ordeal.

She remained minister in charge of HRDC until Paul Martin became Prime Minister on December 12, 2003. She was moved to the backbenches because of her position as a loyalist to the ousted Chrétien. She retired from politics on February 13, 2004, to become an executive director of the International Labour Organization. In July 2005, she left her job with the ILO to return to Canada and marry businessman Henry Stolp. She later returned to ILO as its executive director, residing in New York City.

With the announcement that Martin was stepping down as leader of the Liberal Party, a group called "Liberals for Jane" had hoped to see Stewart seek the party leadership. This was ruled out when Stewart accepted the position of Chief of Staff to acting Leader of the Opposition, Bill Graham. Only weeks later, Stewart stepped down from the post due to family obligations. She was replaced by former cabinet minister Andy Mitchell.

From 2006 to May 2007, Stewart was chief negotiator for the province of Ontario in the Caledonia land dispute.

Stewart comes from a family of politicians. Her father Robert Nixon was leader of the Ontario Liberal Party, while her grandfather was Ontario premier Harry Nixon.

== Electoral record ==
2000 Canadian federal election: Brant
Party	Candidate	Votes	%	±%	Expenditures
Liberal	Jane Stewart	24,068	56.42	–	$46,551
Alliance	Chris Cattle	10,955	25.68		$43,139
Progressive Conservative	Stephen Kun	3,580	8.39		$6,405
New Democratic	Dee Chisholm	3,126	7.33		$9,266
Green	Graeme Dunn	484	1.13		$156
Canadian Action	Mike Clancy	447	1.05		$8,881
Total valid votes/expense limit		42,660	100.00		
Total rejected ballots		262			
Turnout		42,922	56.28		
Electors on the lists		76,270			
Sources: Official Results, Elections Canada and Financial Returns, Elections Canada.

1997 Canadian federal election: Brant
Party	Candidate	Votes	%	±%
Liberal	Jane Stewart	24,125	53.0	+1.5
Reform	Dan Houssar	10,436	22.9	-1.8
Progressive Conservative	Stephen W. Kun	5,781	12.7	+0.5
New Democratic	Pat Franklin	5,201	11.4	+4.5
Total valid votes		45,543	100.0	

1993 Canadian federal election: Brant
Party	Candidate	Votes	%	±%	Expenditures
Liberal	Jane Stewart	24,686	51.46	–	$39,023
Reform	Ken Edmison	11,863	24.73		$36,354
Progressive Conservative	Mabel E. Dougherty	5,831	12.16		$25,624
New Democratic	Michael C. Smith	3,317	6.92		$37,911
National	Herman Kruis	1,227	2.56		$8,148
Green	Jamie Legacey	482	1.00		$0
Libertarian	Helmut Kurmis	258	0.54		$0
Natural Law	Eleanor Toshiko Hyodo	192	0.40		$2,853
Social Credit	Doug Stelpstra	112	0.23		$158
Total valid votes		47,968	100.00		
Total rejected ballots		500			
Turnout		48,468	65.27		
Electors on the lists		74,260			
Source: Thirty-fifth General Election, 1993: Official Voting Results, Published by the Chief Electoral Officer of Canada. Financial figures taken from official contributions and expenses provided by Elections Canada.

26th Canadian Ministry (1993–2003) – Cabinet of Jean Chrétien
Cabinet posts (3)
Predecessor	Office	Successor
Pierre Pettigrew	Minister of Human Resources Development; 1999–2003	Liza Frulla
Ron Irwin	Minister of Indian Affairs and Northern Development; 1997–1999	Bob Nault
David Anderson	Minister of National Revenue; 1996–1997	Herb Dhaliwal
