= David Thompson (Canadian politician) =

Canadian politician

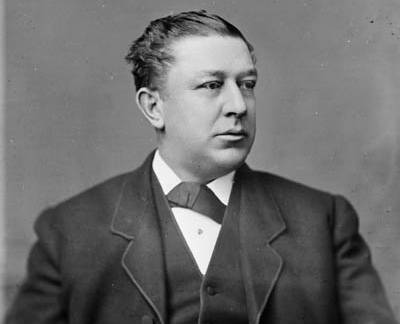
- David Thompson; Source: Library and Archives Canada

Member of Parliament for Haldimand
- In office 1867–1886
- Succeeded by: Charles Wesley Colter

Personal details
- Born: December 7, 1836 Wainfleet Township, Upper Canada
- Died: April 18, 1886 (aged 49) Indiana, Ontario
- Party: Liberal
- Spouse: Elizabeth Stinson
- Children: Andrew Thorburn Thompson
- Parent: David Thompson (father)
- Occupation: Businessman

David Thompson (December 7, 1836 – April 18, 1886) was a Canadian businessman and political figure. He represented Haldimand in the House of Commons of Canada as a Liberal member from 1867 to 1886.

He was born in Wainfleet Township in Upper Canada in 1836, the son of David Thompson who represented Haldimand in the Legislative Assembly of the Province of Canada from 1841 to 1851. After studying at Upper Canada College, he became a merchant selling flour and grain. Thompson married Elizabeth Stinson in 1858. In 1863, he was elected to the 8th Parliament of the Province of Canada for Haldimand; after Confederation, he was reelected to the House of Commons. He died in Indiana, Ontario while still in office in 1886.

David's son, Andrew, later represented Haldimand and Monck in the House of Commons.

The property where the mansion built by Thompson's father still stands is now preserved as a National Historic Site of Canada, Ruthven Park.
