= John Harold =

Canadian politician

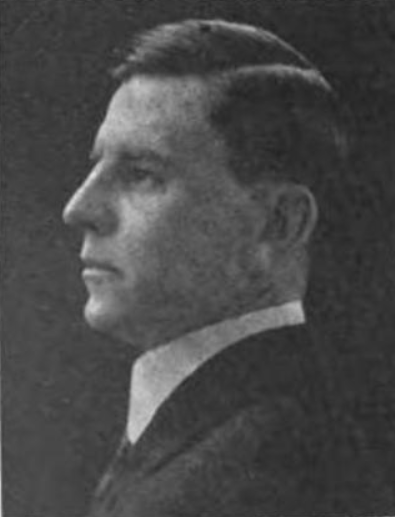

Member of Parliament for Brant
- In office December 1917 – October 1921
- Preceded by: John Henry Fisher
- Succeeded by: William Charles Good

Personal details
- Born: 9 November 1873 Brantford, Ontario
- Died: 16 February 1947 (aged 73) Paris, Ontario
- Party: Unionist
- Profession: Manufacturer

John Harold (9 November 1873 – 16 February 1947) was a Liberal party and Unionist member of the House of Commons of Canada. He was born in Brantford, Ontario and became a manufacturer.

He was elected to Parliament at the Brant riding in the 1917 general election. After serving one federal term, the 13th Canadian Parliament, Harold left the House of Commons and did not seek re-election in the 1921 general vote. He made one attempt to return to Parliament when he was a Liberal candidate for Brant in the 1930 federal election but lost to Franklin Smoke, the incumbent at that time.

He died at his home in Paris, Ontario on 16 February 1947.

== Electoral record ==
1917 Canadian federal election: Brant
Party	Candidate	Votes	%	±%
Government (Liberal–Unionist)	John Harold	2,106	38.8	-13.1
Government (Conservative-Unionist)	Henry Cockshutt	2,023	37.3	
Opposition (Laurier Liberals)	Blackwell Lawrence Doran	1,299	23.9	-24.2
Total valid votes		5,428	100.0	

Note: Unionist vote is compared to Conservative vote in 1911 election.
