= Lionel Herbert Clarke =

Canadian politician

The Honourable Lionel Herbert Clarke
- Portrait by Edmund Wyly Grier

12th Lieutenant Governor of Ontario
- In office November 20, 1919 – August 29, 1921
- Monarch: George V
- Governors General: The Duke of Devonshire; The Lord Byng of Vimy
- Premier: Ernest Charles Drury
- Preceded by: Sir John Strathearn Hendrie
- Succeeded by: Henry Cockshutt

Personal details
- Born: July 20, 1859 Guelph, Canada West
- Died: August 29, 1921 (aged 62) Toronto, Ontario, Canada
- Spouse: Anne Small (m. 1891)
- Education: Trinity College School; University of Edinburgh
- Occupation: Brewer, businessman

Lionel Herbert Clarke (July 20, 1859 – August 29, 1921) was a Guelph-born businessman and the 12th Lieutenant Governor of Ontario, Canada. In 1911, he was appointed the first chairman of the Toronto Harbour Commission

The son of William Clarke and Clara Piggott Strange, he was educated in Port Hope. In 1891, Clarke married Anne Clara Gertrude Small.

In 1893, Lionel partnered with "barley king" Wilmot Deloui Matthews as L. H. Clarke and Company, malt dealers, then in 1900 they established the Canada Malting Company Limited of which Clarke became president in 1908.

Clarke was appointed lieutenant governor November 20, 1919. Diagnosed with stomach cancer, Clarke died at Government House, Toronto. After a state funeral, he was buried in Mount Pleasant Cemetery, Toronto.

Government offices
Preceded by Sir John Strathearn Hendrie	Lieutenant Governor of Ontario; 1919–1921	Succeeded by Henry Cockshutt
