= William Charles Good =

Canadian politician

Member of the Canadian Parliament for Brant
- In office 1921–1925
- Preceded by: John Harold
- Succeeded by: Franklin Smoke

Personal details
- Born: February 24, 1876 Near Brantford, Ontario, Canada
- Died: November 16, 1967 (aged 91) Paris, Ontario, Canada
- Party: Progressive Party of Canada

William Charles Good (February 24, 1876 – November 16, 1967), also known as W. C. Good, was a Canadian politician and leader of the farmers' and co-operative movement in Canada. He served as an Ontario MP from 1921 to 1925.

Good joined the executive of the Farmers' Association in 1904. A proponent of farmers' unity, he helped found the Canadian Council of Agriculture in 1909 with Ernest Charles Drury and E. A. Partridge and helped organize the United Farmers of Ontario and its co-operative arm in 1914.

Good was a prominent member of the Progressive Party of Canada and was elected to the House of Commons of Canada in 1921 as one of its MPs and served until 1925 representing the riding of Brant. He was an advocate of electoral reform, tariff reform, temperance and banking reform.

In June 1922, he introduced legislation in the House of Commons that would have seen Instant-runoff voting used in each riding where more than two candidates were competing, and he also called for demonstration multi-member districts in each province to provide experience of district-level proportional representation. However a majority of MPs voted against the measure.

He was elected president of the Co-operative Union of Canada in 1921, retaining that office until 1945. He was a founding member of the Ginger Group of radical MPs in 1924.

An Ontario Historical Plaque was erected in front of the Myrtleville House museum in Brantford, Ontario, by the province to commemorate William Charles Good's role in Ontario's heritage.

He was author of Production and Taxation in Canada From the Farmers Standpoint (1919) and Farmer Citizen - My Fifty Years in the Canadian Farmers' Movement, published by the Ryerson Press in 1969.

== Archives ==
There is a William Charles Good fonds at Library and Archives Canada. Archival reference number is R4238.

== Electoral record ==
1921 Canadian federal election: Brant
Party	Candidate	Votes	%	±%
Progressive	William Charles Good	3,309	40.8	+2.0
Conservative	William Harper Reid	3,150	38.9	+0.1
Liberal	Robert John Atkin	1,645	20.3	-3.6
Total valid votes		8,104	100.0	

Note: Conservative vote is compared to Unionist vote in 1917 election, and Liberal vote is compared to Opposition vote.
