= Lawrence Pennell =

Canadian lawyer, politician, and jurist (1914-2008)

The Honourable Lawrence T. Pennell PC, QC
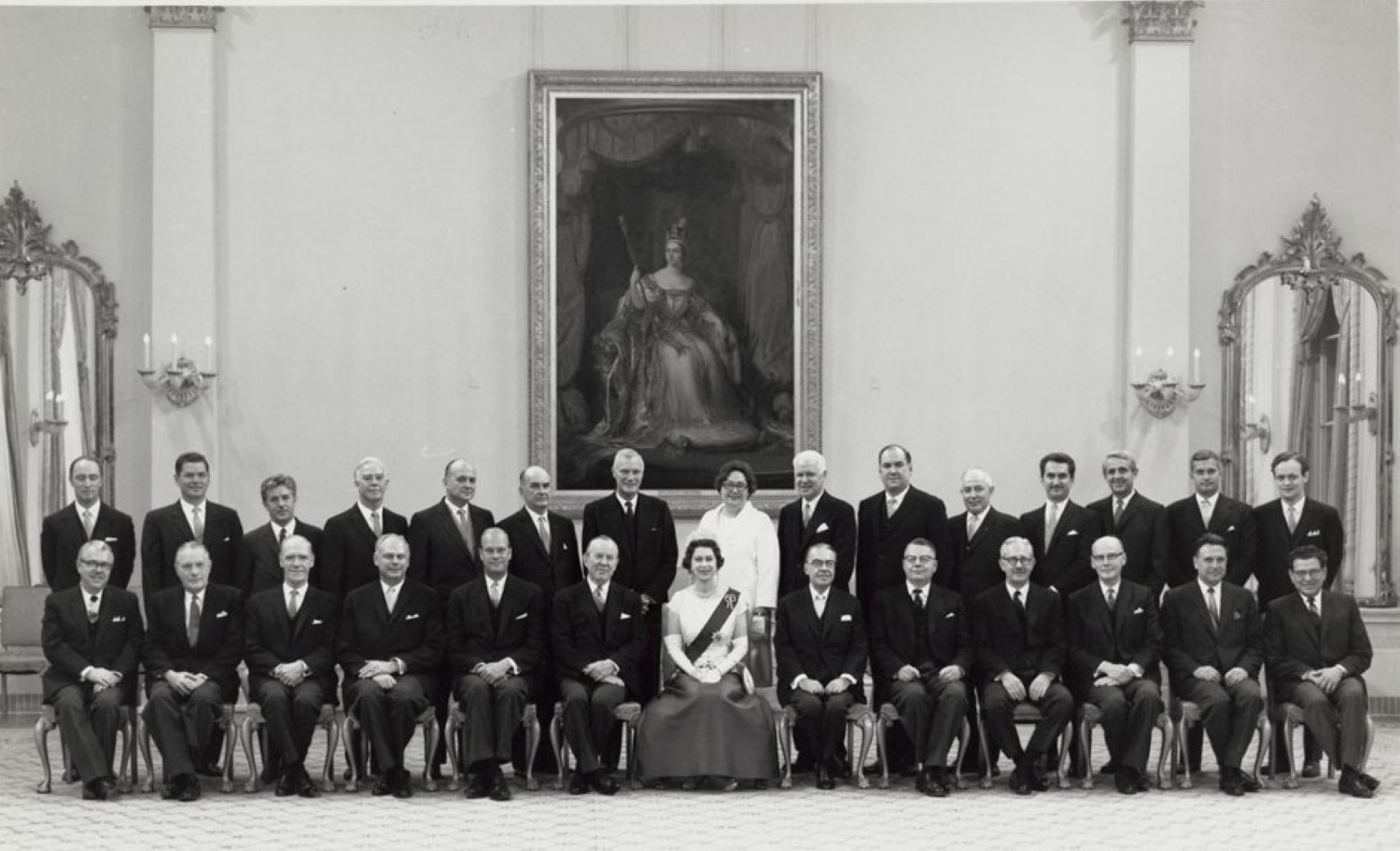
- Pennell (fourth from left in the back row) at a meeting of Elizabeth II with Canadian ministers in 1967

Judge of the Supreme Court of Ontario
- In office 1968–1985

Chancellor of McMaster University
- In office 1971–1977
- Preceded by: Argue Martin
- Succeeded by: Allan Leal

Solicitor General of Canada
- In office July 7, 1965 – April 19, 1968
- Preceded by: John Watson MacNaught
- Succeeded by: John Turner

Member of Parliament for Brant—Haldimand
- In office September 27, 1962 – April 4, 1968
- Preceded by: John A. Charlton
- Succeeded by: District abolished

Personal details
- Born: March 11, 1915 Brantford, Ontario, Canada
- Died: August 9, 2008 (aged 93) Hamilton, Ontario, Canada
- Party: Liberal
- Spouse: Anne Andrews
- Profession: Lawyer

Lawrence T. Pennell, PC QC (March 15, 1914 – August 9, 2008) was a Canadian lawyer, politician, and jurist.

== Early life, education and military service ==
Born in Brantford, Ontario, the youngest of six children of English immigrants John and Agnes Pennell, Pennell grew up on a farm near Smithville, Ontario. After graduating from Smithville High School, he worked at Dofasco for two years before attending McMaster University where he majored in political science and economics. After graduating in 1938, he studied law at Osgoode Hall Law School.

He married Anne Andrews, a registered nurse, in 1943.

During World War II, he served in the Royal Canadian Air Force first as an instructor at the British Commonwealth Air Training Plan in Edmonton, Alberta, and then hunting for submarines in the Gulf of St. Lawrence, based in Scotland, and in the west coast of Africa.

After the war, he was called to the Ontario Bar and practiced law in Brantford.

== Politics ==
Pennell was first elected to the House of Commons of Canada as Liberal Member of Parliament for Brant—Haldimand in the 1962 election.

From 1964 to 1965, he was the Parliamentary Secretary to the Minister of Finance.

In 1965, he was appointed to the Cabinet by Prime Minister Lester Pearson as Solicitor General of Canada.

He retired from politics in April 1968 and was appointed to the Supreme Court of Ontario where he served until 1985.

After retiring, he served on the Ontario Mental Health Review Board and on an Ontario commission of inquiry on municipal government.

In 1946, he co-founded the Brantford Red Sox baseball team.

From 1971 to 1977, he was Chancellor of McMaster University.

Academic offices
Preceded by Argue Martin	Chancellor of McMaster University; 1971–1977	Succeeded by Allan Leal
