= Brant—Wentworth =

Former federal electoral district in Ontario, Canada

Ontario electoral district

Defunct federal electoral district
- Legislature: House of Commons
- District created: 1947
- District abolished: 1952
- First contested: 1949
- Last contested: 1949

Brant—Wentworth was a federal electoral district in Ontario, Canada, that was represented in the House of Commons of Canada from 1949 to 1953. This riding was created in 1947 from parts of Brant and Wentworth ridings.

It consisted of the town of Paris and the townships of South Dumfries, Onondaga, and Tuscarora and the part of the township of Brantford lying north and east of the left bank of Grand River in the county of Brant; and the townships of Beverly, Ancaster, Glanford and Binbrook in the county of Wentworth.

The electoral district was abolished in 1952 when it was redistributed between Brant—Haldimand and Wentworth ridings.

== Members of Parliament ==
Parliament	Years	Member	Party
Riding created from Brant and Wentworth
21st	1949–1953	John A. Charlton	Progressive Conservative
Riding dissolved into Brant—Haldimand and Wentworth

== Election results ==
1949 Canadian federal election
Party	Candidate	Votes
Progressive Conservative	John A. Charlton	6,693
Liberal	James A. Telfer	6,669
Co-operative Commonwealth	George E. Cox	2,259

== See also ==
- List of Canadian electoral districts
- Historical federal electoral districts of Canada
