= Derek Blackburn =

Canadian politician

Member of Parliament for Brant
- In office 1971–1993
- Preceded by: James Elisha Brown
- Succeeded by: Jane Stewart

Personal details
- Born: Derek Nigel Ernest Blackburn; June 16, 1934 Sault Ste. Marie, Ontario
- Died: October 12, 2017 (aged 83) Gatineau, Quebec
- Party: New Democratic Party
- Occupation: Politician; high school teacher

Derek Nigel Ernest Blackburn (June 16, 1934 – October 12, 2017) was a Canadian politician, who served as a Member of Parliament from 1971 to 1993. He represented the electoral district of Brant as a member of the New Democratic Party. Blackburn served for a period as the party's Defense critic.

He was raised in Stratford, Ontario, and was the son of John and Mabel Blackburn.

First elected in a by-election in 1971, Blackburn was reelected in every subsequent election up to and including the 1988 election. He retired from elected politics in 1993 when he was appointed to the federal Immigration and Refugee Board. Blackburn died on October 12, 2017, at the age of 83.

== Electoral record ==
1988 Canadian federal election: Brant
Party	Candidate	Votes	%	Expenditures
New Democratic	Derek Blackburn	19,633	41.46	$41,490
Progressive Conservative	Steve Bosanac	14,084	29.74	$45,061
Liberal	David J. Carll	11,461	24.20	$40,772
Christian Heritage	Geraldine de Vries	1,786	3.77	$10,857
Green	Jamie Legacey	258	0.54	$0
Libertarian	Helmut Kurmis	95	0.20	$299
Commonwealth of Canada	Barnabas Simon	34	0.07	$0
Total valid votes		47,351	100.00	
Total rejected ballots		287		
Turnout		47,638	71.53	
Electors on the lists		66,603		

1984 Canadian federal election: Brant
Party	Candidate	Votes	%	±%
New Democratic	Derek Blackburn	23,103	44.20	
Progressive Conservative	Rick Sterne	21,679	41.47	
Liberal	Peter Hexamer	7,286	13.94	
Social Credit	Charley Harris	207	0.40	
Total valid votes		52,275	100.00	
Total rejected ballots		266		
Turnout		52,541	73.16	
Electors on the lists		71,821		

1980 Canadian federal election: Brant
Party	Candidate	Votes	%	±%
New Democratic	Derek Blackburn	19,194	41.1	-1.1
Progressive Conservative	Rick Sterne	14,614	31.3	+0.2
Liberal	Jo Brennan	12,725	27.2	+0.7
Social Credit	Winnifred M. Moyer	103	0.2	
Marxist–Leninist	Malkit Randhawa	93	0.2	0.0
Total valid votes		46,729	100.0	
lop.parl.ca

1979 Canadian federal election: Brant
Party	Candidate	Votes	%	±%
New Democratic	Derek Blackburn	20,908	42.2	+0.1
Progressive Conservative	Arthur Tobey	15,422	31.1	+11.2
Liberal	Jack Bawcutt	13,154	26.5	-11.1
Marxist–Leninist	Malkit Randhawa	93	0.2	
Total valid votes		49,577	100.0	

1974 Canadian federal election: Brant
Party	Candidate	Votes	%	±%
New Democratic	Derek Blackburn	19,453	42.1	-1.0
Liberal	Vern Young	17,410	37.6	+5.9
Progressive Conservative	Alex Keresturi	9,228	20.0	-5.3
Communist	Paul F. Jarbeau	158	0.3	
Total valid votes		46,249	100.0	
lop.parl.ca

1972 Canadian federal election: Brant
Party	Candidate	Votes	%	±%
New Democratic	Derek Blackburn	20,002	43.1	0.0
Liberal	Dick Mundy	14,730	31.7	-0.5
Progressive Conservative	Alex Keresturi	11,711	25.2	+1.3
Total valid votes		46,443	100.0	

By-election on May 31, 1971
Party	Candidate	Votes	%	±%
New Democratic	Derek Blackburn	17,147	43.1	+12.4
Liberal	Bob McIntosh	12,831	32.2	-7.6
Progressive Conservative	Emory Knill	9,517	23.9	-5.7
Social Credit	A.J. Sid Hamelin	322	0.8	
Total valid votes		39,817	100.0	

1968 Canadian federal election: Brant
Party	Candidate	Votes	%
Liberal	James Elisha Brown	16,029	39.8
New Democratic	Derek Blackburn	12,333	30.6
Progressive Conservative	Geoff Styles	11,901	29.6
Total valid votes		40,263	100.0
