= Percival John Montague =

Canadian Army general

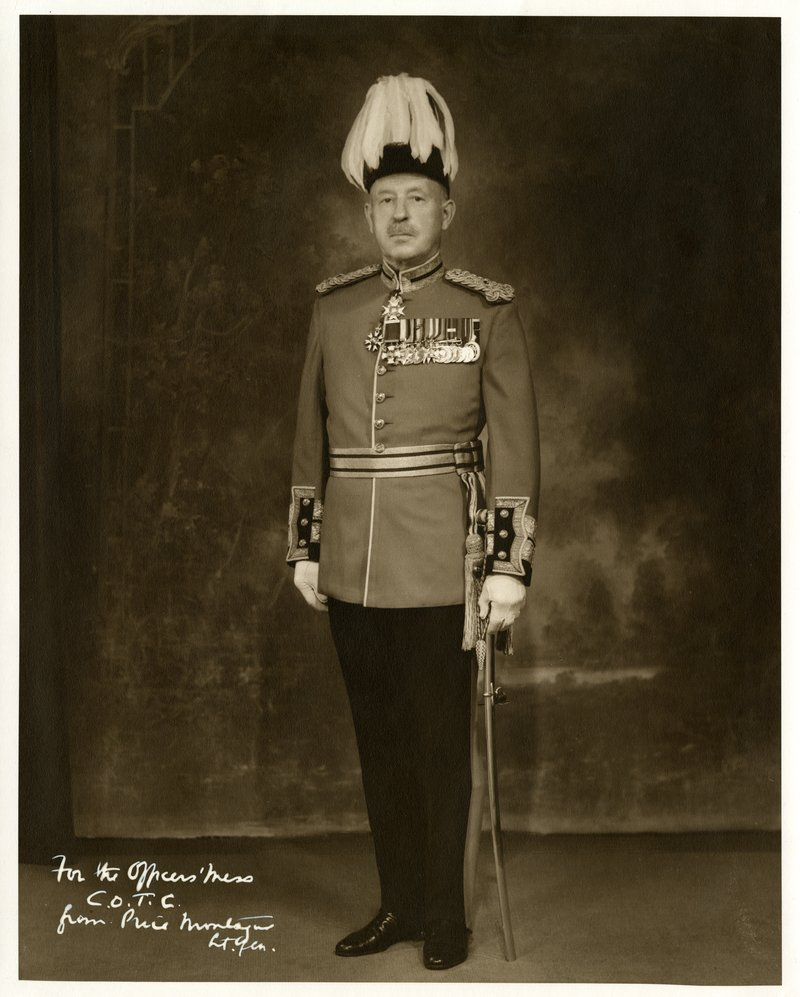

Lieutenant General Percival "Price" John Montague, CB, CMG, DSO, MC, VD, CD (10 November 1882 – 11 June 1966) was a Canadian Army general and judge. He was the highest-ranking officer from Manitoba during the Second World War.

== Military career ==
Montague was born in Dunville, Ontario on 10 November 1882, the son of Walter Humphries Montague. He was educated at Upper Canada College, the University of Toronto, and Osgoode Hall, where he graduated in 1905. He was called to the bar in Ontario and Manitoba in 1907. He joined the firm of Pitblado, Hoskin, Montague and Drummond Hay in 1913 and practiced there until he was appointed to the bench in 1932. He was appointed a King's Counsel in 1928 and appointed to the Court of King's Bench of Manitoba in 1932.

Montague took a leave of absence from legal practice during the First World War. He was assistant adjutant and quartermaster general in the 2nd Canadian Division by 1917, by which time he had been awarded the Military Cross, and in January 1918 was awarded the Distinguished Service Order (DSO). In 1919 was made a CMG.

He was Commanding Officer of the Fort Garry Horse from 1920 to 1924, and Commanding Officer of the 6th Canadian Mounted Brigade from 1928 to 1936. From 1932 to 1940 he was Aide-de-camp to the Governor General of Canada.

On the outbreak of the Second World War he took a leave of absence from the bench and was posted to the Canadian Military Headquarters in London, as assistant adjutant and quartermaster-general, Deputy Adjutant-General, Chief of Staff, and Chief Administration Officer. In 1943 he was appointed Judge Advocate-General Canadian Army Overseas. He retired in 1945 with the rank of Lieutenant-General.

After the war, he returned to the Manitoba bench and was raised to the Manitoba Court of Appeal in 1951, retiring in 1959.
