= Haldimand (federal electoral district) =

Former federal electoral district in Ontario, Canada

Ontario electoral district

Defunct federal electoral district
- Legislature: House of Commons
- District created: 1867, 1903
- District abolished: 1892, 1952
- First contested: 1867
- Last contested: 1949

Haldimand was a federal electoral district in the province of Ontario, Canada, that was represented in the House of Commons of Canada from 1867 to 1892 and from 1904 to 1953. It was created by the British North America Act 1867.

It initially consisted of the Townships of Oneida, Seneca, Cayuga North, Cayuga South, Rainham, Walpole, and Dunn. In 1872, the Township of Dunn was excluded from the riding. In 1882, it was defined to consist of the townships of Walpole, Oneida, Rainham, Seneca and North Cayuga, and the villages of Cayuga and Caledonia.

The electoral district was abolished in 1892 when it was merged into Haldimand and Monck riding.

Haldimand riding was recreated in 1903, consisting of the county of Haldimand.

The electoral district was abolished in 1952 when it was merged into Brant—Haldimand riding.

== Members of Parliament ==
This riding elected the following members of the House of Commons of Canada:

Parliament	Years	Member	Party
1st	1867–1872	David Thompson	Liberal
2nd	1872–1874	David Thompson	Liberal
3rd	1874–1878	David Thompson	Liberal
4th	1878–1882	David Thompson	Liberal
5th	1882–1886†	David Thompson	Liberal
5th	1886–1887	Charles Wesley Colter	Liberal
6th	1887–1887	Walter Humphries Montague	Conservative
6th	1887–1889	Walter Humphries Montague	Conservative
6th	1889–1890	Charles Wesley Colter	Liberal
6th	1890–1891	Walter Humphries Montague	Conservative
7th	1891–1895	Walter Humphries Montague	Conservative
7th	1895–1896	Walter Humphries Montague	Conservative
Riding dissolved into Haldimand and Monck
Riding re-created from Haldimand and Monck
10th	1904–1908	Francis Ramsey Lalor	Conservative
11th	1908–1911	Francis Ramsey Lalor	Conservative
12th	1911–1917	Francis Ramsey Lalor	Conservative
13th	1917–1921	Francis Ramsey Lalor	Government (Unionist)
14th	1921–1925	Mark Senn	Conservative
15th	1925–1926	Mark Senn	Conservative
16th	1926–1930	Mark Senn	Conservative
17th	1930–1935	Mark Senn	Conservative
18th	1935–1940	Mark Senn	Conservative
19th	1940–1945	Mark Senn	Conservative
20th	1945–1949	Mark Senn	Progressive Conservative
21st	1949–1953	Earl Catherwood	Progressive Conservative
Riding dissolved into Brant—Haldimand

== Election results ==
=== 1867–1896 ===
1867 Canadian federal election
Party	Candidate	Votes
Liberal	David Thompson	1,391
Unknown	R. McKinnon	1,022
Eligible voters		3,114
Source: Canadian Parliamentary Guide, 1871

1872 Canadian federal election
Party	Candidate	Votes
Liberal	David Thompson	acclaimed

1874 Canadian federal election
Party	Candidate	Votes
Liberal	David Thompson	acclaimed

1878 Canadian federal election
Party	Candidate	Votes
Liberal	David Thompson	1,566
Conservative	Nicholas Flood Davin	1,400
Unknown	Thomas Lester	30

1882 Canadian federal election
Party	Candidate	Votes
Liberal	David Thompson	1,490
Unknown	William H. Merritt	1,364

By-election on 8 September 1886 On Mr. Thompson's death, 18 April 1886
Party	Candidate	Votes
Liberal	Charles Wesley Colter	acclaimed

1887 Canadian federal election
Party	Candidate	Votes
Conservative	Walter Humphries Montague	1,746
Liberal	Charles Wesley Colter	1,745

By-election on 12 November 1887 On the election being declared void
Party	Candidate	Votes
Conservative	Walter Humphries Montague	1,828
Liberal	Charles Wesley Colter	1,811

By-election on 30 January 1889 On the election being declared void
Party	Candidate	Votes
Liberal	Charles Wesley Colter	1,803
Conservative	Walter Humphries Montague	1,757

By-election on 20 February 1890 On the election being declared void
Party	Candidate	Votes
Conservative	Walter Humphries Montague	unknown
Liberal	Charles Wesley Colter	unknown

1891 Canadian federal election
Party	Candidate	Votes
Conservative	Walter Humphries Montague	1,896
Liberal	Charles Wesley Colter	1,818

By-election on 17 April 1895 On Mr. Montague being appointed Secretary of State, 26 March 1895
Party	Candidate	Votes
Conservative	Walter Humphries Montague	acclaimed

=== 1904–1943 ===
1904 Canadian federal election
Party	Candidate	Votes
Conservative	Francis Ramsey Lalor	2,548
Liberal	Andrew Thorburn Thompson	2,289

1908 Canadian federal election
Party	Candidate	Votes
Conservative	Francis Ramsey Lalor	2,644
Liberal	Robert Francis Miller	2,398

1911 Canadian federal election
Party	Candidate	Votes
Conservative	Francis Ramsey Lalor	2,817
Liberal	Robert Francis Miller	2,138

1917 Canadian federal election
Party	Candidate	Votes
Government (Unionist)	Francis Ramsey Lalor	3,696
Opposition (Laurier Liberals)	John James Parsons	2,480

1921 Canadian federal election
Party	Candidate	Votes
Conservative	Mark Senn	4,517
Progressive	Samuel Adam Beck	3,800
Liberal	David Zealand Gibson	1,467

1925 Canadian federal election
Party	Candidate	Votes
Conservative	Mark Senn	5,415
Liberal	Thomas Marshall	4,266

1926 Canadian federal election
Party	Candidate	Votes
Conservative	Mark Senn	5,511
Progressive	Warren Stringer	4,028

1930 Canadian federal election
Party	Candidate	Votes
Conservative	Mark Senn	6,171
Liberal	William Whyte Camelford	4,864

1935 Canadian federal election
Party	Candidate	Votes
Conservative	Mark Senn	5,750
Liberal	Frank Laidlaw	5,031
Reconstruction	John James Parsons	554

1940 Canadian federal election
Party	Candidate	Votes
Conservative	Mark Senn	5,515
Liberal	Basil North Macaulay	4,712

1945 Canadian federal election
Party	Candidate	Votes
Progressive Conservative	Mark Senn	5,844
Liberal	Edgar Fraser Raney	4,255
Co-operative Commonwealth	William Ernest Jones	695

1949 Canadian federal election
Party	Candidate	Votes
Progressive Conservative	Earl Catherwood	5,432
Liberal	G. Garfield Disher	5,124
Co-operative Commonwealth	Howard Elis Brown	978

== See also ==
- List of Canadian electoral districts
- Historical federal electoral districts of Canada
