= Walter Humphries Montague =

Canadian politician (1858–1915)

The Honourable Walter Humphries Montague PC
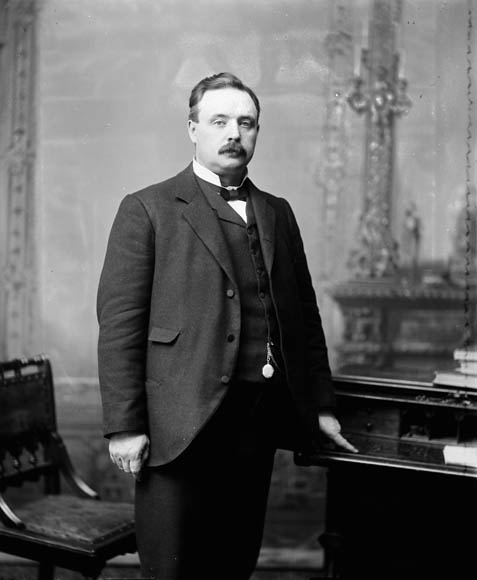

Member of the Canadian Parliament for Haldimand
- In office 1887–1889
- Preceded by: Charles Wesley Colter
- Succeeded by: Charles Wesley Colter
- In office 1890–1895
- Preceded by: Charles Wesley Colter
- Succeeded by: District was abolished in 1892

Member of the Canadian Parliament for Haldimand and Monck
- In office 1896–1900
- Preceded by: District was created in 1892
- Succeeded by: Andrew Thorburn Thompson

Member of the Legislative Assembly of Manitoba for Kildonan and St. Andrews
- In office 1913–1915
- Preceded by: Orton Grain
- Succeeded by: George Prout

Personal details
- Born: 21 November 1858 Adelaide Township, Canada West
- Died: 14 November 1915 (aged 56) Winnipeg, Manitoba, Canada
- Party: Conservative
- Spouse: Angie Furey
- Cabinet: Federal: Minister of Agriculture; Secretary of State of Canada; Minister Without Portfolio; Provincial: Minister of Public Works

Walter Humphries Montague, PC (21 November 1858 – 14 November 1915) was a Canadian politician. He was a federal cabinet minister in the governments of Mackenzie Bowell and Charles Tupper, and subsequently a provincial cabinet minister in the Manitoba government of Rodmond Roblin. Montague was a member of the Conservative Party of Canada.

== Biography ==
Montague was born in Adelaide, in Middlesex County, Canada West (now Ontario), the son of Joseph Montague. He was educated at Woodstock College and the Toronto School of Medicine, and received a medical degree from Victoria University in 1882. He practised medicine in Dunnville, Ontario and later at the General Hospital in Hamilton. He married Angie Furey. Montague was a member of the College of Physicians and Surgeons of Ontario, and a licentiate of the Royal College of Physicians in Edinburgh, Scotland.

He campaigned for the Legislative Assembly of Ontario as a candidate of the provincial Conservative Party in the provincial election of 1883, but lost to Liberal candidate Richard Harcourt by 129 votes in the constituency of Monck. He campaigned for the House of Commons of Canada in the 1887 federal election, and defeated Liberal incumbent Charles Wesley Colter by a single vote in the riding of Haldimand, 1,746 to 1,745. The Conservatives won this election, and Montague served as a backbench supporter of John A. Macdonald's government.

Elections were frequently challenged in this period of Canadian history, and Montague's one-vote victory did not stand official scrutiny. His victory was nullified on 15 October 1887, and a new election was called for the riding on 12 November. Montague this time defeated Colter by seventeen votes, and returned to the Commons. The Liberals once again challenged the result, and the second election was voided by the Supreme Court of Canada on 14 December 1888. A third election was called for 30 January 1889, which Colter won by forty-six votes.

Colter's victory, however, proved no more solid than Montague's had been. The Conservatives challenged the result of the third election, and its results were set aside on 22 January 1890. A fourth election was called for 20 February 1890, and Montague was again declared elected. He was also returned in the 1891 federal election, defeating Colter by the more convincing margin of seventy-eight votes. This time, the result was not overturned.

The Conservatives won the 1891 election, and Montague continued to serve as a government backbencher. He was promoted to cabinet by Prime Minister Mackenzie Bowell on 21 December 1894 as a Minister without portfolio. On 26 March 1895, he was further promoted to Secretary of State of Canada. He held this position until 21 December 1895, when he was named as Canada's Minister of Agriculture.

Montague resigned from cabinet on 5 January 1896, to protest against Bowell's inaction on the Manitoba Schools Question. He was part of the group of ministers famously described by Bowell as a "nest of traitors". After the issue was resolved, he returned to cabinet on 15 January. He was retained in the Agriculture portfolio when Charles Tupper replaced Bowell as Prime Minister on 1 May 1896.

Montague was easily re-elected in the 1896 federal election in the redistributed riding of Haldimand and Monck. The Conservatives were defeated by Wilfrid Laurier's Liberals, however, and Montague served as an opposition member in the parliamentary that followed. He lost his seat to Andrew Thorburn Thompson by 137 votes in the 1900 election.

He returned to his medical practice after his defeat, and moved to Winnipeg, Manitoba in 1908. He returned to political life on 4 November 1913, when he was appointed as Minister of Public Works in Rodmond Roblin's provincial Conservative government. He did not hold a seat in the Legislative Assembly of Manitoba at the time, so a by-election was called in Kildonan and St. Andrews for 29 November 1913.

This by-election was extremely bitter and divisive. The opposition aggressively attacked Montague's personal life and political record, while the Conservative electoral machine had over 40 cars working the constituency on polling day. Montague was elected, defeating Liberal candidate A.N. Bredin by 370 votes. He was re-elected in the 1914 provincial election by a single vote.

The Rodmond government was forced to resign in 1915, after a commission of enquiry called by the Lieutenant Governor found the government guilty of corruption in the tendering of contracts for new legislative buildings. The administration resigned on 12 May 1915, and new elections were called. Montague was not a candidate, and the Liberals won the election in a landslide.

Montague was inducted on fraud charges for his part in the contracts scandal, but died in Winnipeg before legal proceedings could begin.

His son Percival John Montague was a general and judge.
