= John A. Charlton =

Canadian politician

John Alpheus Charlton

Member of Parliament for Brant
- In office June 1945 – June 1949
- Preceded by: George Wood

Member of Parliament for Brant—Wentworth
- In office June 1949 – August 1953

Member of Parliament for Brant—Haldimand
- In office August 1953 – June 1962
- Succeeded by: Lawrence Pennell

Personal details
- Born: 5 July 1907 Brantford, Ontario
- Died: 28 January 1977 (aged 69)
- Party: Progressive Conservative
- Profession: farmer, veterinarian

John Alpheus Charlton (5 July 1907 – 28 January 1977) was a Progressive Conservative party member of the House of Commons of Canada. He was born in Brantford, Ontario and became a farmer and veterinarian by career.

He was first elected at the Brant riding in the 1945 general election and served five consecutive terms from the 20th to the 24th Canadian Parliaments. During that time, his riding changed to Brant—Wentworth then Brant—Haldimand. Charlton was defeated in the 1962 federal election by Lawrence Pennell of the Liberal party.

During his terms in the House of Commons, he served as Parliamentary Assistant to the Minister of Agriculture (1957–1958). He was also Parliamentary Secretary to the Minister of Citizenship and Immigration (1959–1961) and to the Minister of Agriculture (1962).

== Electoral record ==
1940 Canadian federal election: Brant
Party	Candidate	Votes	%	±%
Liberal	George Wood	4,657	50.8	+6.3
National Government	Syl Apps	4,519	49.2	+12.1
Total valid votes		9,176	100.0	

Note: "National Government" vote is compared to Conservative vote in 1935 election.
