= Andrew Thorburn Thompson =

Canadian politician

Andrew Thorburn Thompson (May 27, 1870 – April 20, 1939) was a Canadian military officer, editor, lawyer and a third generation political figure of Canada.

Thompson was born in Seneca Township and raised at Ruthven Park Estate, now designated as Ruthven Park National Historic Site; located just north of Cayuga, Ontario. His father, David Thompson was a businessman and political figure who sat in the Legislative Assembly of the Province of Canada and then the House of Commons of Canada. His grandfather, also named David, had sat in the 1st and 2nd Legislative Assemblies for the United Province of Canada representing Haldimand County.

A lawyer and editor, he was elected to the House of Commons as the Liberal Member of Parliament for Haldimand and Monck in the 1900 federal election defeating former Conservative cabinet minister Walter Humphries Montague by less than 150 votes.

Due to redistribution, Thompson's riding was abolished and in the 1904 federal election, he ran for re-election in the redrawn district of Haldimand but was defeated by his Conservative opponent by less than 300 votes.

During World War I, Thompson was lieutenant colonel of the 114th Regiment composed of white and First Nations soldiers from Thompson's home region of the Haldimand County area.

In 1923, he was chosen by the deputy superintendent general of the Royal Canadian Mounted Police to lead a one-man inquiry into the disturbances on a Six Nations reserve and the demands by Cayuga nation hereditary chief Deskaheh for recognition of the rights of his people after he threatened to take his complaints to the League of Nations along with demands for an independent state under Article 17 of the League's Covenant. As Thompson had commanded Iroquois soldiers during World War I he was seen as a mediator who could be trusted by both sides. However, Thompson's Commission to Investigate and Report upon the Affairs of the Six Nations Indians issued a report that recommended that the hereditary council that governed the reserve be replaced by an elected council thus depriving Deskaheh of his right to speak for the Six Nations. The new council was elected in October 1924.
