= Haldimand and Monck =

Former federal electoral district in Ontario, Canada

Haldimand and Monck was a federal electoral district represented in the House of Commons of Canada from 1892 to 1904. It was located in the province of Ontario.

It was created in 1892 from parts of Haldimand and Monck ridings.

It consisted of the townships of Oneida, Rainham, Seneca, North Cayuga and South Cayuga, Canboro', Dunn, Moulton, Sherbrooke and Wainfleet, and the villages of Caledonia, Cayuga, Hagersville and Dunnville.

The electoral district was abolished in 1903 when it was redistributed between Haldimand and Welland ridings.

== Election results ==
1896 Canadian federal election
Party	Candidate	Votes
Conservative	MONTAGUE, Hon. W.H.	2,197
Liberal	DAVIS, A.A.	1,484
Patrons of Industry	BECK, S.A.	728

1900 Canadian federal election
Party	Candidate	Votes
Liberal	THOMPSON, A.T.	2,239
Conservative	MONTAGUE, Hon. W.H.	2,102

== See also ==
- List of Canadian electoral districts
- Historical federal electoral districts of Canada
