= Brant—Haldimand (federal electoral district) =

Former federal electoral district in Ontario, Canada

Ontario electoral district

Defunct federal electoral district
- Legislature: House of Commons
- District created: 1952
- District abolished: 1966
- First contested: 1953
- Last contested: 1965

Brant—Haldimand was a federal electoral district in Ontario, Canada, that was represented in the House of Commons of Canada from 1953 to 1968, and in the Legislative Assembly of Ontario from 1987 to 1999.

The riding was created in 1952 from parts of Brant—Wentworth and Haldimand.

It consisted of the counties of Haldimand and Brant. The townships of Burford and Oakland in Brant were excluded, along with the part of the township of Brantford lying south and west of Grand River, the part of the township of Brantford not included in the electoral district of Brantford, and the city of Brantford.

The electoral district was abolished in 1966 when it was redistributed between Brant, Norfolk—Haldimand and Welland ridings.

== Members of Parliament ==
This riding elected the following members of Parliament:

Parliament	Years	Member	Party
Riding created from Brant—Wentworth and Haldimand
22nd	1953–1957	John A. Charlton	Progressive Conservative
23rd	1957–1958	John A. Charlton	Progressive Conservative
24th	1958–1962	John A. Charlton	Progressive Conservative
25th	1962–1963	Lawrence Pennell	Liberal
26th	1963–1965	Lawrence Pennell	Liberal
27th	1965–1968	Lawrence Pennell	Liberal
Riding dissolved into Brant, Norfolk—Haldimand and Welland

== Federal election results ==
1953 Canadian federal election
Party	Candidate	Votes
Progressive Conservative	John A. Charlton	10,059
Liberal	Garfield Disher	9,305
Co-operative Commonwealth	Norman A. Davison	1,358

1957 Canadian federal election
Party	Candidate	Votes
Progressive Conservative	John A. Charlton	12,858
Liberal	Garfield Disher	8,063
Co-operative Commonwealth	Charlie L. MacKay	2,168

1958 Canadian federal election
Party	Candidate	Votes
Progressive Conservative	John A. Charlton	15,182
Liberal	Walter Madden	6,630
Co-operative Commonwealth	Herbert Prince	1,462

1962 Canadian federal election
Party	Candidate	Votes
Liberal	Lawrence Pennell	11,278
Progressive Conservative	John A. Charlton	10,883
New Democratic	Allen Charles Good	2,626
Social Credit	George S. Mallory	941

1963 Canadian federal election
Party	Candidate	Votes
Liberal	Lawrence Pennell	12,733
Progressive Conservative	A. Gordon Skinner	10,814
New Democratic	William B. Mowle	2,274
Social Credit	David Fehr	557

1965 Canadian federal election
Party	Candidate	Votes
Liberal	Lawrence Pennell	13,179
Progressive Conservative	Joe Bradbury	7,909
New Democratic	Derek Blackburn	4,813

== See also ==
- List of Canadian electoral districts
- Historical federal electoral districts of Canada
