= Indiana, Ontario =

Abandoned village in Ontario, Canada

Coordinates: 42.978426°N 79.873182°W

Indiana is a ghost town in Haldimand County, Ontario, Canada. It was located on the north-east bank of the Grand River, north of Cayuga. The Indiana site was known as 'Grand Rapids' before the first white settlers arrived in the 1830's, a village of members of the Lower Cayuga nation of the Six Nations, who moved from the NY state area after the 1784 Haldimand Tract Proclamation granted Six Nations about 950,000 acres of land along the Grand River. Indiana flourished in the mid- 1800's as a mill town and base for the river transport trade. Until the 1860s it was the largest industrial town in Haldimand County, but by 1905 it was largely abandoned. Part of the 1,200-acre (490-hectare) townsite is now included in the Ruthven Park National Historic Site of Canada.

It is also connected to a smaller satellite ghost town known as Deans, which was founded in part to provide Indiana with a railway connection. The site was referred to as "Deans" as late as 1940–1951.

== History ==
=== Canal development ===
The history of Indiana, Ontario is heavily connected to the Grand River. The Grand River had long been a focal point for trade and general transportation in the area. The river was shallow at many points, however, which made it relatively easy for westward-travelling settlers to ford with wagons, but difficult for river freight operations. The Grand River Navigation Company was formed in the early 1830s (after a set of meetings by backers which began as early as 1827) around the idea of canalizing the river with a set of five locks. Before the railway boom in Upper Canada, Ontario's economy was heavily driven by its lake trade, with port cities such as Hamilton and Toronto beginning to industrialize. Canalization, in theory, would connect new and existing settlements along the river to Lake Erie, allowing for easier trade logistics.

Unfortunately for promoters, the land around the Grand River had been granted to the Haudenosaunee Six Nations in 1784 by the Governor Sir Frederick Haldimand under the Haldimand Proclamation, which pledged to the Haudenosaunee an allotment of land "six miles deep from each side of the river beginning at Lake Erie and extending in that proportion to the head of the said river, which them and their posterity are to enjoy for ever." The Six Nations opposed the canal development project. This resulted in a land dispute between the promoters of the company and the Six Nations. When the company was finally chartered, it was with the Six Nations as its largest shareholder; these shares had likely been purchased by the government of Upper Canada on behalf of Six Nations without their knowledge, in order to give them a financial stake in the project. Over the years, the government continued to purchase shares on behalf of the Six Nations, until they owned over 75% of the company.

In 1833, construction began on the first lock at a location known as Grand River Rapids, which was the place that would soon become Indiana. This made Indiana the first natural stopping point along the river en route to Brantford. The new town quickly boomed in population, with David Thompson, a prominent businessman and financial backer of the Grand River Navigation Company, taking an interest in it. The oldest surviving document referring to the place as "Indiana" was a letter written in 1833. Other early documents which used the new name include an 1834 advertisement placed by Thompson soliciting for canal workers at Indiana and an 1835 petition by townspeople for the government to construct a bridge across the river. A prominent lumber merchant, Thomas Lester, arrived in 1837.

=== Heyday ===
By the early 1840s, the Grand River Navigation Company had begun to collapse, and Thompson divested himself from it by selling most of his shares to the Six Nations and distancing himself publicly from the company. Lots in Indiana were sold off by the company piecemeal along with general land sales to buttress its finances; Thompson personally purchased almost two dozen lots. Perhaps originally intended as a planned company town similar to many mill towns of the era, development was instead varied, with numerous small rural-industrial enterprises, as well as a diverse housing stock that included frame, brick, log, and stone houses, with the vast majority built out of wood. Only 50 to 60 of the over one hundred lots were ever built on, despite a population of 714 in the 1830s.

While Indiana did not have the full characteristics of a company town in terms of rigid planning and direct control by a paternalistic owner, it nevertheless was guided by David Thompson as a wealthy patron with a vested interest in overseeing his large workforce. Thompson sponsored a small local Presbyterian church, despite being personally non-religious and much of the population in the area being Catholic. While Thompson invested in Indiana, he also diversified his real estate interests, and following his election to the legislative assembly, spent time away in Kingston. He died in 1851 and was soon replaced by his son, also named David Thompson, as the main patron of the town.

The younger David Thompson was noted for being more generous than his father, as well as more interested in civic and religious affairs. He spent much of his childhood in Indiana and despite being a second son, he was designated as his father's heir, possibly due to his brother James' alcoholism. The younger David was a strict teetotaller who was an elder in the Presbyterian church, but also donated widely to other religious organizations, while also personally providing charity to Indiana residents. He pursued a number of business and development interests, but was not as lucky or as shrewd in business as his father, and projects such as an attempt to revive the Grand River Navigation Company in reduced form (as the Haldimand Navigation Company) were a failure. The water-powered Ruthven Mill was a major source of income for Thompson, who sought to develop better infrastructure for the control of water power along the river and cooperate with other mill owners to do so. He invested thousands into repairing and upgrading the mill, including a major overhaul in 1870.

=== Decline ===
With the lack of a railway connection, the Ruthven Mill had difficult prospects for exporting its products. When the Canada Southern Railway was constructed in 1871 through Cayuga, bypassing Indiana, it placed Indiana at a disadvantage. Thompson, whose land had been expropriated for railway construction, was also being lobbied as the local member of parliament by Haldimand businessmen to support railway expansion in the area. He compromised with the construction of a new settlement, Deans, which was intentionally planned as a railway town to connect Indiana with the Canada Southern line. At Deans, Thompson constructed a small railway station and grain storehouse, which he used to export processed grain from Indiana to various parts of Canada and the United States.

Thompson, however, continued to focus on water power, developing a secondary mill site at Deans, which was intended to be a sawmill. In 1879, Thompson funded the construction of a new dam on the Grand River, but by February 1880 he discontinued the project under mounting expenses. In April 1881, the guard locks at Deans failed, landing Thompson a repair bill in the thousands of dollars and causing him to lose interest in further development at Deans. By the early 1880s, the dam failures were continuing, and other dams along the river had begun to shut down.

By the mid-1880s, Thompson was intermittently pursuing both the sale of the mill and also potential upgrades; meanwhile, production at the Ruthven Mill had ceased. In 1885, Thompson pursued the sale of the entire property including his mansion, but nothing came of this, possibly because he was ill. He died the following year, in 1886.

Haldimand County historian Robert Bertram Nelles noted in 1905 that "[o]nly the site of Indiana or Dean's now remains.... Only the older residents of Haldimand remember anything about Indiana."

== Legacy ==
In 2004 and 2006, archaeological investigations were carried out under the leadership of John Triggs of Wilfrid Laurier University in Waterloo, Ontario. Three house lots were excavated.

David Thompson built an impressive Greek Revival mansion in the late 1840s, which is now the centrepiece of the Ruthven Park National Historic Site. The 10,000 square foot mansion is open to public tours year round.

== See also ==
- List of ghost towns in Ontario
