= Will Bouma =

Canadian politician (born 1972)

Will Bouma MPP
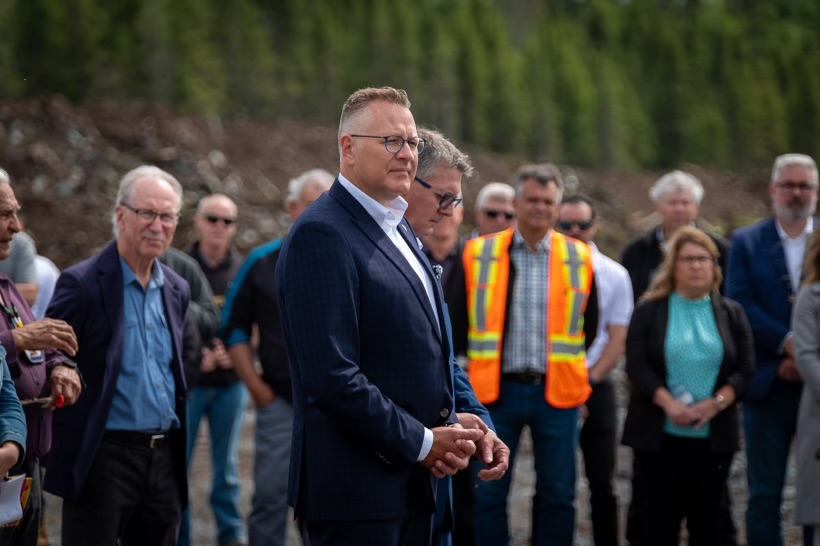
- Bouma in 2024

Parliamentary Assistant to the Minister of Intergovernmental Affairs
- Incumbent
- Assumed office April 3, 2024
- Minister: Doug Ford
- Preceded by: Andrea Khanjin

Parliamentary Assistant to the Minister of Finance
- In office July 9, 2021 – June 1, 2022
- Minister: Peter Bethlenfalvy
- Premier: Doug Ford
- Preceded by: Stan Cho

Parliamentary Assistant to the Minister of Indigenous Affairs

Member of the Ontario Provincial Parliament for Brantford—Brant
- Incumbent
- Assumed office June 7, 2018
- Preceded by: Dave Levac

Brant County Councillor for Ward 1
- In office December 1, 2014 – June 7, 2018 Serving with John Wheat
- Preceded by: Steve Schmitt; John Wheat
- Succeeded by: John MacAlpine; John Wheat

Personal details
- Born: July 27, 1972 (age 54) Rinsumageast, Netherlands
- Party: Progressive Conservative
- Education: University of Waterloo (BS); Michigan College of Optometry (OD)
- Occupation: Optometrist
- Website: https://willbouma.ca/

Willem Bouma MPP (born July 27, 1972) is a Dutch-Canadian politician, who was elected to the Legislative Assembly of Ontario in the 2018 provincial election. He represents the riding of Brantford—Brant as a member of the Progressive Conservative Party. Before becoming an MPP, Bouma practised optometry and was a member of the Brant County Council.

== Early life and optometry career ==
Born in the village of Rinsumageast in The Netherlands, Bouma's family moved to Ontario when he was four years old. His parents operated a dairy farm near Forest, Ontario. Bouma attended the University of Waterloo, and graduated with a Bachelor of Science in 1995. He then studied at the Michigan College of Optometry, graduating in 1999. He practiced optometry in Michigan for seven years, but moved back to Ontario in 2006, settling in St. George, where he established an optometry office.

== Politics ==
Bouma served in several community positions before he ran for office, including the Brant County Committee of Adjustment; the Brant County Board of Health; and as president of the Brant Waterways Foundation.

=== Brant County Council ===
In 2014, he ran for the Brant County Council in ward 1, which consists of the rural areas in the north of the municipality. Bouma placed second in the election, 28 votes behind incumbent councillor John Wheat, winning one of the two seats.

=== Provincial Parliament ===
Bouma ran to succeed retiring MPP Dave Levac in the 2018 provincial election. He was nominated by the Brantford—Brant Progressive Conservative Riding Association on April 8, 2017. Bouma's campaign focused primarily on cost-of-living, healthcare, hydro prices, and taxation. Bouma defeated NDP candidate Alex Felsky in the June 7 election, winning by 635 votes (1.09%).

Bouma was sworn in on July 11, 2018. In June 2019, he was appointed Parliamentary Assistant to the Premier.

==== Abortion controversy ====
Bouma, along with fellow Progressive Conservative MPPs Christina Mitas and Sam Oosterhoff, spoke at an anti-abortion rally in Queen's Park in May 2019. Bouma quoted from the Bible, while Oosterhoff pledged to "make abortion unthinkable in our lifetime". This drew criticism from parts of the Progressive Conservative Party, as well as the New Democratic Official Opposition. The Brantford—Brant NDP issued a statement calling Bouma's comments "archaic", and Opposition Leader Andrea Horwath said that she was "horrified" that the MPPs' participation in the demonstration. Following the rally, Premier Doug Ford said that he would not re-open the abortion debate. Demonstrators on both sides of the issue gathered outside of Bouma's office in Brantford on May 31, 2019.

== Personal life ==
Bouma lives in the town of St. George with his wife Joni and their five children.

== Electoral record ==
2025 Ontario general election: Brantford—Brant
Party	Candidate	Votes	%	±%	Expenditures
Progressive Conservative	Will Bouma	24,169	47.23	+3.06	$85,032
New Democratic	Harvey Bischof	12,005	23.46	–4.83	$21,786
Liberal	Ron Fox	10,364	20.25	+7.30	$37,606
Green	Karleigh Csordas	2,597	5.08	–1.68	$15,568
New Blue	Joshua Carron	1,138	2.22	–2.23	$1,548
Libertarian	Rob Ferguson	500	0.98	+0.34	$0
None of the Above	Mike Clancy	316	0.62	–	$0
Ontario Alliance	James Carruthers	83	0.16	–	$0
Total valid votes		51,172	99.26		
Total rejected, unmarked and declined ballots		381	0.74	+0.24	
Turnout		51,553	43.41	+1.35	
Eligible voters		118,761			
Progressive Conservative hold		Swing		▲3.95	
Source: Elections Ontario

2022 Ontario general election: Brantford—Brant
Party	Candidate	Votes	%	±%	Expenditures
Progressive Conservative	Will Bouma	20,738	44.17	+2.17	$67,092
New Democratic	Harvey Bischof	13,283	28.29	–12.62	$113,139
Liberal	Ruby Toor	6,083	12.96	+3.41	$33,966
Green	Karleigh Csordas	3,174	6.76	+2.05	$20,258
New Blue	Tad Brudzinski	2,089	4.45	–	$1,726
Ontario Party	Allan Wilson	640	1.36	+0.45	$362
Canadians' Choice	Leslie Bory	490	1.04	+0.60	$0
Libertarian	Rob Ferguson	299	0.64	–0.01	$0
Independent	John Turmel	157	0.33	+0.23	$0
Total valid votes/expense limit		46,953	99.50	–	$157,086
Total rejected, unmarked and declined ballots		234	0.50	–0.55	
Turnout		47,187	42.05	–15.11	
Eligible voters		112,204			
Progressive Conservative hold		Swing		▲7.39	
Source: Elections Ontario

2018 Ontario general election
Party	Candidate	Votes	%	±%
Progressive Conservative	Will Bouma	24,437	42.00	+12.07
New Democratic	Alex Felsky	23,802	40.91	+13.76
Liberal	Ruby Toor	5,553	9.54	-28.08
Green	Ken Burns	2,741	4.71	+0.65
Ontario Party	Dave Wrobel	534	0.92	
None of the Above	Nicholas Archer	424	0.73	
Libertarian	Rob Ferguson	379	0.65	-0.08
Canadians' Choice	Leslie Bory	258	0.44	
Pauper	John Turmel	60	0.10	-0.02
Total valid votes		58,188	100.0	
Progressive Conservative gain from Liberal		Swing		-
Source: Elections Ontario

2014 Brant County Council election, Ward 1
Candidate	Vote	%
John Wheat	956	20.69
Will Bouma	928	20.09
Willie Morley	754	16.32
Dave Thomson	490	10.61
John MacApline	448	9.70
Ken Burns	429	9.28
John Bell	411	8.90
William Kelley	112	2.42
Ray Grummett	92	1.99
Source: County of Brant
