= John Westbrook =

John Westbrook may refer to:

- John Westbrook (Pennsylvania politician) (1789–1852), Democratic member of the U.S. House of Representatives from Pennsylvania
- John Wesley Westbrook (1880–1934), Canadian official and political figure
- John Westbrook (actor) (1922–1989), English actor
- John Westbrook (American football) (1947–1983), first African American to play football in the Southwest Conference

== See also ==
- John Westbrook Hornbeck (1804–1848), Whig member of the U.S. House of Representatives from Pennsylvania
