= Brant County Council =

Municipal government of Brant, Ontario, Canada

Type
- Type: Unicameral city council

History
- Established: 1999
- New session started: December 3, 2018

Leadership
- Mayor of Brant: David Bailey since October 22, 2018

Structure
- Seats: 10 plus Mayor
- Length of term: 4 years

Elections
- Last election: October 24, 2022 (10 seats)
- Next election: October 26, 2026

Meeting place
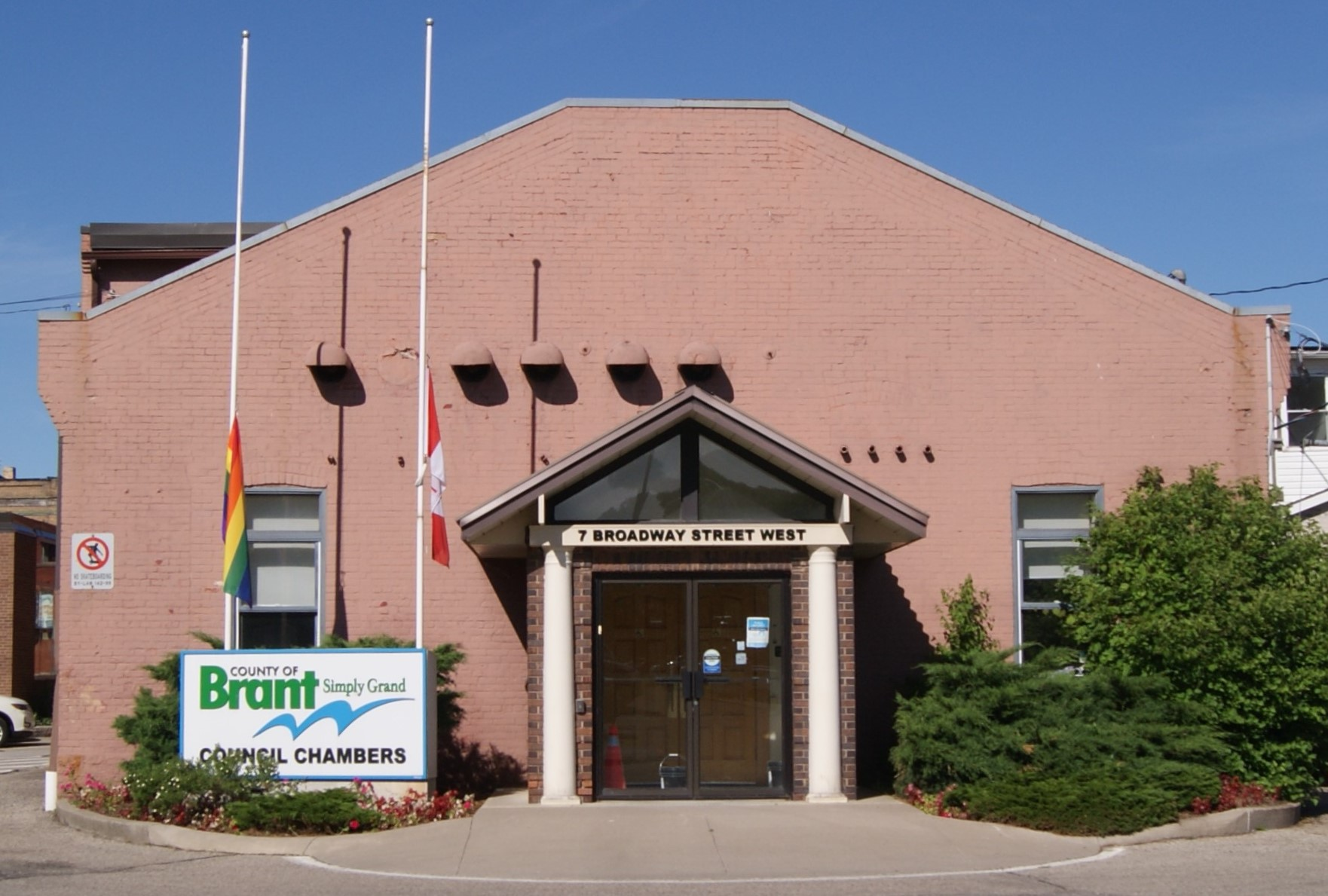
- Council Chamber; County of Brant Office; Paris, Ontario

Website
- www.brant.ca/council-and-county-administration/council-and-committees/

The Brant County Council is the governing body of the County of Brant government in Brant, Ontario, Canada. Members represent wards throughout the county, and are known as councillors. The council consists of a mayor and ten councillors, two representing each of five wards. Elections are held every four years, with the two candidates with the highest popular vote winning the election.

== 2022–2026 Council ==
Councillor	Ward #
David Bailey	Mayor
John MacApline	1
Jennifer Kyle	1
Steve Howes	2
Lukas Oakley	2
John Bell	3
John Peirce	3
Robert Chambers	4
David Miller	4
Brian Coleman	5
Ella Haley (2026); Christine Garneau (until 2025)	5

== 2018–2022 Council ==
Councillor	Ward #
David Bailey	Mayor
John MacApline	1
John Wheat	1
Marc Laferriere	2
Steve Howes	2
John Bell	3
John Peirce	3
David Miller	4
Robert Chambers	4
Brian Coleman	5
Joan Gatward	5

== 2014–2018 Council ==
Councillor	Ward #
Ronald Eddy	Mayor
John Wheat	1
Will Bouma	1
Shirley Simmons	2
Don Cardy	2
Murray Powell	3
John Peirce	3
David Miller	4
Robert Chambers	4
Brian Coleman	5
Joan Gatward	5
