= Sabrina's Law =

Law in Ontario

Sabrina's Law, 2005

Legislative Assembly of Ontario
- Long title: An Act to protect anaphylactic students / Loi visant à protéger les élèves anaphylactiques
- Passed: May 16th, 2005
- Commenced: January 1st, 2006
- Status: In force

Sabrina's Law, 2005 (official long title: An Act to Protect Anaphylactic Pupils) is a law in Ontario, Canada, which requires Ontario school boards to establish and maintain policies to protect anaphylactic students from common causes of anaphylactic reactions.

== Background ==
The bill's common title is named after Sabrina Shannon, a 13 year old student from Pembroke, Ontario, who died in September 2003 after suffering an anaphylactic reaction at school. Her death and its publicity would contribute to the public support for and later passing of Sabrina's Law.

== Legislative history ==
The bill was first introduced during the first session of the 38th Legislative Assembly of Ontario, in November 2003 by then MPP Dave Levac. After its initial introduction it was amended by a standing committee and carried unanimously by the House in May 2005. It was then granted royal assent in June 2005 and came into effect on January 1, 2006.

== Provisions ==
The law does not require the banning of any foods, but it does require that every school board establish and maintain an anaphylactic policy to protect students with severe allergies by limiting their risk of exposure to allergens. As a result many schools have elected to ban certain foods outright. The law also requires that schools implement communication plans for providing educational resources about life-threatening allergies to parents and students. School principals are expected to create and maintain individual files for each anaphylactic student in their school. The law also requires that schools train staff to recognize anaphylactic shock and provide first aid.
