= Progressive Conservative Party of Ontario candidates in the 1971 Ontario provincial election =

The Progressive Conservative Party of Ontario ran a full slate of 117 candidates in the 1971 provincial election, seventy-eight of whom were elected. The Progressive Conservatives emerged as the largest party in the legislature for the ninth consecutive time, with an eighth consecutive majority government. Information about the party's candidates may be found here.

== Candidates ==
=== Brant: J. Pryor Harris ===
J. Pryor Harris (died April 8, 2010) served in the Royal Canadian Air Force as an instrument technician during World War II. He moved to Burford, Ontario after the war and in 1945 opened a jewelry shop that he would own and operate for the rest of his life. He was a town councillor and deputy reeve in Burford and a member of the Holy Trinity Anglican Church, the Royal Canadian Legion, and the Burford Masonic Lodge. In 2001, he was given a lifetime achievement award by the Brantford Regional Chamber of Commerce.

Harris ran for the Progressive Conservatives in two elections against Liberal Party leader Robert Nixon. He was a lifelong member of the Conservative Party of Canada and its antecedents.

Electoral record
Election	Division	Party	Votes	%	Place	Winner
1967 provincial	Brant	Progressive Conservative	4,176	30.40	2/3	Robert Nixon, Liberal
1971 provincial	Brant	Progressive Conservative	5,147	29.66	2/3	Robert Nixon, Liberal
