= Thomas Scott Davidson =

Canadian politician (1858–1933)

Ontario MPP
- In office 1914–1919
- Preceded by: John Wesley Westbrook
- Succeeded by: Harry Nixon
- Constituency: Brant North

Personal details
- Born: March 11, 1858 South Dumfries Township, Canada West
- Died: June 6, 1933 (aged 75) Paris, Ontario
- Party: Liberal
- Spouse: Marion Bullock (m. 1892)
- Occupation: Auctioneer

Thomas Scott Davidson (March 11, 1858 – June 6, 1933) was a Canadian politician and auctioneer. He represented Brant North in the Legislative Assembly of Ontario from 1914 to 1919 as a Liberal member.

He was born in South Dumfries Township, Canada West, the son of James Davidson. He served on the council for Brant County and was warden in 1900. In 1892, he married Marion Bullock. He was an unsuccessful candidate for a seat in the federal parliament in 1926. He died in Paris, Ontario in 1933.
