= Hugh Finlayson =

Canadian politician

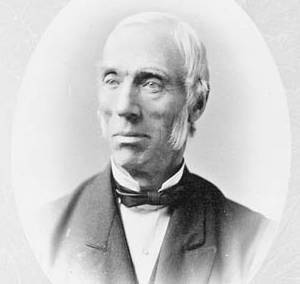

Ontario MPP
- In office 1867–1879
- Preceded by: Riding established
- Succeeded by: James Young
- Constituency: Brant North

Personal details
- Born: December 12, 1810 Edinburgh, Scotland
- Died: June 3, 1889 (aged 78) Paris, Ontario
- Party: Liberal
- Spouse: Mary Dennis (m. 1897)
- Occupation: Businessman

Hugh Finlayson (December 12, 1810 – June 3, 1889) was an Ontario businessman and political figure. He represented Brant North in the Legislative Assembly of Ontario as a Liberal member from 1867 to 1879.

He was born in Edinburgh, Scotland in 1810 and came to North America in 1832. He originally arrived at New York City, made his way to Brantford in Upper Canada in 1835 and settled in Paris, Ontario. He worked as a saddle and harness maker and also operated a tannery. He served as mayor of Paris in 1858 and represented East Brant in the Legislative Assembly of the Province of Canada from 1858 to 1861. In 1867, he was elected to the Ontario legislative assembly. He died in Paris in 1889.

== Electoral history ==
1867 Ontario general election: Brant North
Party	Candidate	Votes	%
Liberal	Hugh Finlayson	706	53.16
Conservative	W. Turnbull	622	46.84
Total valid votes		1,328	72.69
Eligible voters		1,827	
Liberal pickup new district.			
Source: Elections Ontario

1871 Ontario general election: Brant North
Party	Candidate	Votes	%	±%
Liberal	Hugh Finlayson	740	60.26	+7.10
Conservative	Mr. la Pierre	488	39.74	−7.10
Turnout		1,228	60.73	−11.96
Eligible voters		2,022		
Liberal hold		Swing		+7.10
Source: Elections Ontario

1875 Ontario general election: Brant North
Party	Candidate	Votes	%	±%
Liberal	Hugh Finlayson	747	54.17	−6.09
Conservative	J.S. Crawford	632	45.83	+6.09
Turnout		1,379	62.54	+1.81
Eligible voters		2,205		
Liberal hold		Swing		−6.09
Source: Elections Ontario
