= Daniel Burt (politician) =

Canadian politician

Ontario MPP
- In office 1895–1904
- Preceded by: William Bruce Wood
- Succeeded by: John Henry Fisher
- Constituency: Brant North

Personal details
- Born: September 14, 1847 South Dumfries Township, Brant County, Canada West
- Died: October 16, 1924 (aged 77) St. George
- Party: Liberal
- Spouse: Kate Mainwaring (m. 1873)
- Occupation: Farmer

Daniel Burt (September 14, 1847 – October 16, 1924) was an Ontario farmer and political figure. He represented Brant North in the Legislative Assembly of Ontario from 1895 to 1904 as a Liberal member.

== Early life ==
He was born in South Dumfries Township, Brant County, Canada West, the son of Robert Burt, a Scottish immigrant. In 1873, he married Kate Mainwaring. He served as reeve for South Dumfries and warden for Brant county.

== Career ==
Burt was also president of the North Brant Agricultural Society and the North Brant Farmer's Institute. As county warden, he was one of the directors of the Brant Memorial Association which erected a monument to the memory of Joseph Brant in 1886.

Burt was elected to the provincial assembly in an 1895 by-election after William Bruce Wood retired from office and became registrar for Brant. He was defeated by John Henry Fisher in 1905. In 1909, Burt was named customs collector at Paris and served until 1919.

== Death ==
He died at St. George in 1924.
