= Peter Preston (politician) =

Canadian politician

Ontario MPP
- In office 1995–1999
- Preceded by: Ron Eddy
- Succeeded by: Riding abolished
- Constituency: Brant—Haldimand

Personal details
- Born: June 3, 1935 Hamilton, Ontario, Canada
- Died: October 14, 2016 (aged 81) Hamilton, Ontario, Canada
- Party: Progressive Conservative
- Occupation: Newspaper editor

Peter Langdon Preston (June 3, 1935 – October 14, 2016) was a Canadian politician in Ontario. He was a Progressive Conservative member of the Legislative Assembly of Ontario from 1995 to 1999. He represented the riding of Brant—Haldimand. He died at his residence, in Hamilton, on October 16, 2016.

== Background ==
Preston was a non-commissioned officer with the Royal Canadian Engineers for a number of years. He also worked in sales and management insurance, and founded Preston House in 1984 as a group home for boys aged twelve to eighteen. He also founded the Rocking P Peruvian Ranch, where is raised Peruvian horses (Peruvian Paso).

== Politics ==
Preston's first involvement in politics was as an Alderman on the Town Council in Grimsby, Ontario. He was elected to the Ontario legislature in the 1995 provincial election, defeating Liberal incumbent Ron Eddy by about 3,500 votes in the mostly rural southern Ontario riding of Brant—Haldimand. The seat was formerly known as a Liberal stronghold, and Preston's victory was regarded by many as an upset. He served as a backbench supporter of the government of Mike Harris for the next four years.

Preston's riding was eliminated by redistribution prior to the 1999 provincial election, and he chose to seek re-election in the urban riding of Hamilton East. He finished a distant second against Liberal Dominic Agostino.
