= 2018 Brant municipal election =

2018 Municipal Elections in Brent, Ontario

2018 Brant mayoral election
- October 22, 2018
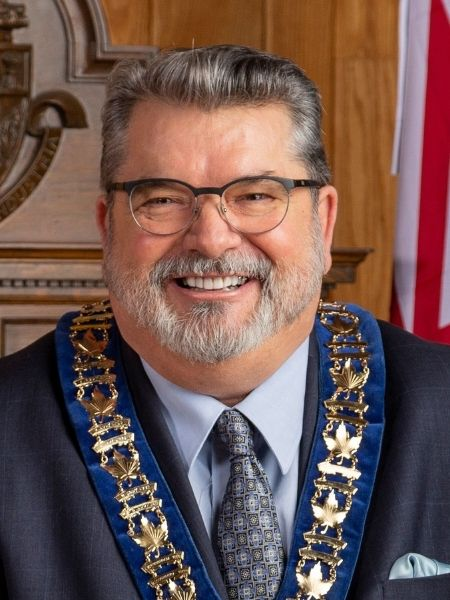

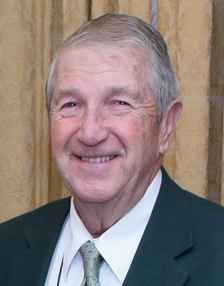

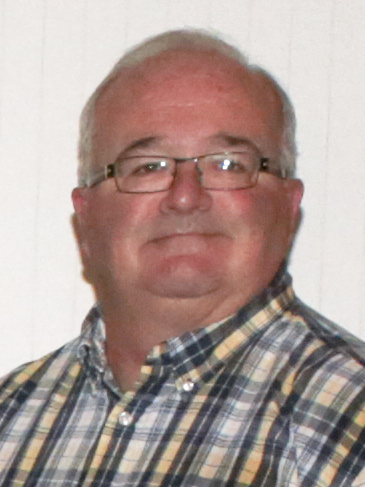
Candidate	David Bailey	Ronald Eddy
Popular vote	4,478	3,156
Percentage	47.58%	33.54%
		SP
Candidate	Don Cardy	Shawn Pratt
Popular vote	1,133	644
Percentage	12.04%	6.84%
Mayor of Brant before election
Ronald Eddy
Elected Mayor of Brant
David Bailey

The 2018 Brant municipal election took place on October 22, 2018. Seven-term incumbent Ronald Eddy lost re-election to businessman David Bailey. Bailey is the first openly gay mayor of Brant.

== Mayoral candidates ==
- Ronald Eddy, incumbent mayor and former MPP for Brant—Haldimand
- David Bailey, businessman
- Don Cardy, Brant County Councillor for Ward 2
- Shawn Pratt, businessman

== Results ==
=== Mayor ===
Mayoral Candidate	Vote	%
David Bailey	4,478	47.58
Ronald Eddy (incumbent)	3,156	33.54
Don Cardy	1,133	12.04
Shawn Pratt	644	6.84

=== Brant County Council ===
Two to be elected from each ward. The results for Brant County Council are as follows:

Ward 1
Candidate	Vote	%
John Wheat (incumbent)	1,254	33.26
John MacAlpine	1,148	30.45
Willie Morley	958	25.41
Nick Quail	410	10.88

Ward 2
Candidate	Vote	%
Marc Laferriere	1,378	34.02
Steve Howes	1,211	28.99
Shirley Simons (incumbent)	770	19.01
Steven Acheson	344	8.49
Ellay Heys	296	7.31
Phil Ogborne	52	1.28

Ward 3
Candidate	Vote	%
John Peirce (incumbent)	850	27.00
John Bell	642	20.39
Marty Verhey	559	17.76
Clifford Atfield	416	13.21
Edith Stone	383	12.17
Myles D. Rusak	261	8.29
Murray Powell (incumbent) (Note: Powell died three weeks before the election.)	37	1.18

Ward 4
Candidate	Vote	%
Robert Chambers (incumbent)	1,061	37.45
David Miller (incumbent)	960	33.89
Marilyn Baptist	548	19.34
Laura Mordaunt	264	9.32

Ward 5
Candidate	Vote	%
Brian Coleman (incumbent)	1,067	32.32
Joan Gatward (incumbent)	994	30.11
Ella Haley	800	24.24
Owen DeBoer	440	13.33

=== School board trustees ===
==== English trustees ====
Candidate	Vote	%
Christina Speers	5,453	32.82
Rita Collver	4,394	26.44
David VanTilborg	3,592	21.62
Tom Waldschmidt	3,178	19.12

==== French trustee ====
Candidate	Vote	%
Pierre Girouard	724	73.28
Denis Frawley	264	26.72
