= John Henry Fisher =

Canadian politician

The Honourable John Henry Fisher

Canadian Senator from Ontario
- In office 1917–1933
- Nominated by: Robert Borden
- Appointed by: Victor Cavendish

Member of Parliament for Brant
- In office 1911–1917
- Preceded by: William Paterson
- Succeeded by: John Harold

Ontario MPP
- In office 1905–1911
- Preceded by: Daniel Burt
- Succeeded by: John Wesley Westbrook
- Constituency: Brant North

Personal details
- Born: April 3, 1855 Paris, Canada West
- Died: December 1, 1933 (aged 78) Ottawa, Ontario, Canada
- Party: Conservative
- Spouse: Jessie D. Martin (m. 1883)
- Occupation: Businessman

John Henry Fisher (April 3, 1855 – December 1, 1933) was an Ontario merchant and political figure. He represented Brant North in the Legislative Assembly of Ontario from 1905 to 1911 and Brant in the House of Commons of Canada from 1911 to 1917 as a Conservative member. He also served in the Senate of Canada from 1917 until his death.

== Background ==
He was born in Paris, Canada West, the son of Robert Fisher, who came to Upper Canada from Devonshire, England. In 1883, Fisher married Jessie D. Martin. He was reeve of Paris in 1885 and 1886, county warden in 1886 and also served five years as Paris' mayor. He ran unsuccessfully against Daniel Burt in 1898 and 1902 before defeating Burt in 1905.

Fisher was appointed Honorary Colonel of the 25th Brant Dragoons after the First World War.

== Electoral record ==
1911 Canadian federal election: Brant
Party	Candidate	Votes	%	±%
Conservative	John Henry Fisher	1,795	51.9	+5.5
Liberal	William Paterson	1,666	48.1	-5.5
Total valid votes		3,461	100.0	
