= William Bruce Wood =

Canadian politician

Ontario MPP
- In office 1886–1898
- Preceded by: James Young
- Succeeded by: Daniel Burt
- Constituency: Brant North

Personal details
- Born: June 11, 1848 Aberdeenshire, Scotland
- Died: March 19, 1928 (aged 79) Montreal, Quebec
- Party: Liberal
- Spouse: Ellen Malcolmson (m. 1874)
- Occupation: Businessman

William Bruce Wood (June 11, 1848 – March 19, 1928) was a manufacturer and political figure in Ontario, Canada. He represented Brant North in the Legislative Assembly of Ontario as a Liberal member from 1886 to 1895.

He was born in Aberdeenshire, Scotland in 1848, the son of Alexander Wood, and came to Canada West in 1854 with his family. He was educated in Perth and London. He entered business as a sawmill and gristmill owner in St. George and was also a grain merchant. In 1874, Wood married Ellen Malcolmson. He served on the councils for South Dumfries Township and Brant County. Wood later served as government whip. In 1895, Wood introduced a bill to allow women to be admitted as barristers to the Law Society of Upper Canada. He retired due to poor health later that year and was named registrar for Brant County, serving in that post until 1905. Wood served as mayor of Brantford from 1909 to 1910. Soon afterwards, he moved to Montreal, where he served as president and general manager of Dominion Flour Mills.

He died in Montreal in 1928.

His brother David Beattie also served as mayor of Brantford.
