= Dave Levac =

Canadian politician

Dave Levac OOnt
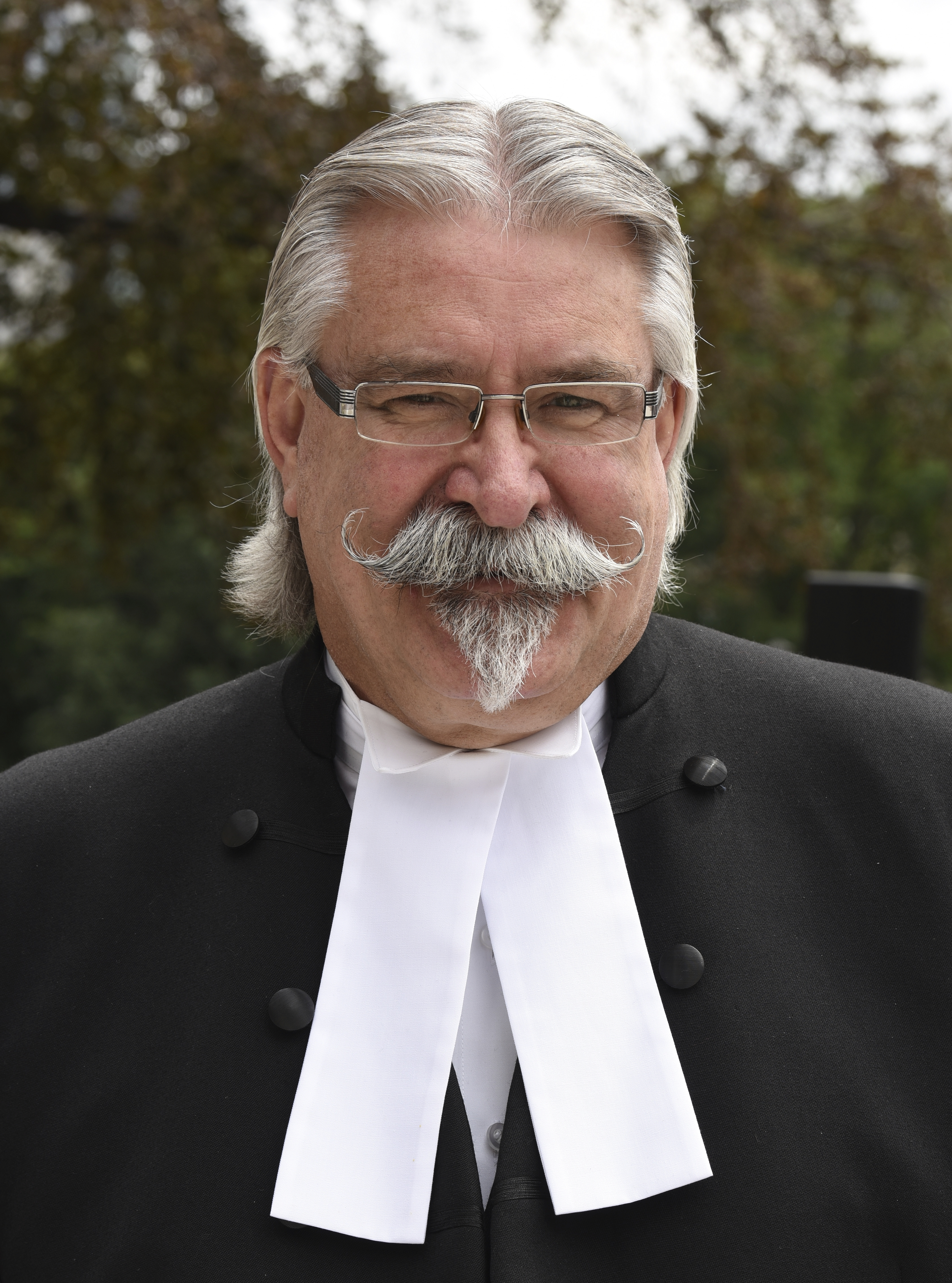

41st Speaker of the Legislative Assembly of Ontario
- In office November 21, 2011 – July 11, 2018
- Preceded by: Steve Peters
- Succeeded by: Ted Arnott

Member of the Ontario Provincial Parliament for Brant
- In office June 3, 1999 – June 7, 2018
- Preceded by: Ron Johnson
- Succeeded by: Will Bouma

Personal details
- Born: April 6, 1954 (age 72) Brantford, Ontario
- Party: Ontario Liberal
- Education: Wilfrid Laurier University (BA, 1976); Queen's University at Kingston (BEd, 1977); Niagara University (MSc, 1992)
- Occupation: Teacher

David Joseph Levac OOnt (born April 6, 1954) is a retired Canadian politician who was the 41st speaker of the Legislative Assembly of Ontario from 2011 to 2018. Levac was elected to the Legislative Assembly in 1999 as a member of the Ontario Liberal Party. He served as the member of Provincial Parliament (MPP) for Brant until 2018 and is the Ontario legislature's longest serving speaker.

== Background ==
Born in Brantford, Ontario, Levac attended Wilfrid Laurier University, where he earned a Bachelor of Arts in 1976. He completed teacher's college at Queen's University in 1977, beginning to work a teacher in the early 1980s, and became a principal in Brantford in 1989. In 1992, he attended Niagara University to complete a master's degree in education. Levac received the Canada 125 Medal in 1993, was named OECTA Distinguished Teacher in 1994 for his work in conflict resolution programs, and was named Brantford's Citizen of the Year in 1997 by readers of the Brantford Expositor. He also served as co-ordinator of Queen Elizabeth II's Royal Visit to Brantford in 1997. He was awarded the Queen Elizabeth II Golden Jubilee Medal in 2002. In 2011 he was awarded the Chevalier of the Order of Merit for his educational efforts with respect to the Ukrainian famine in the 1930s.

== Political career ==
Levac was elected in the 1999 provincial election, defeating Progressive Conservative (PC) candidate Alayne Sokoloski by 956 votes in the riding of Brant. The PCs won a majority government in this election, and Levac sat as an opposition member for the next four years.

The Liberals won a majority government in the 2003 provincial election and Levac again defeated Sokoloski, this time by over 10,000 votes. Levac was named chief government whip. Levac was re-elected in 2007, 2011, and 2014.

On April 9, 2009 Levac, along with co-sponsors Cheri DiNovo and Frank Klees passed bill 147 – the Holodomor Memorial Day Act. This was the first piece of legislation in Ontario history to be introduced with tri-partisan sponsorship. This historic legislation recognizes Ukrainian man-made famine as an act of Genocide.

On January 25, 2010, Levac was named parliamentary assistant to the minister of energy and infrastructure.

After the 2011 election, Levac was elected Speaker of the Legislative Assembly of Ontario. He beat three other Liberal members, David Zimmer, Kevin Flynn, and Donna Cansfield. Cansfield was an early favourite for the position but lost to Levac on a second ballot after the New Democratic Party (NDP) voted in a bloc for Levac. No NDP or PC members put their names forward due to the Liberal government's delicate one-seat minority status in the legislature. Levac was re-elected as speaker after the 2014 election defeating four other contenders.

On May 5, 2017, Levac announced he would not run for his seat again in the 2018 Ontario general election after 19 years in the legislature and seven of those years as speaker.

In 2022, Levac was appointed to the Order of Ontario.

== Electoral record ==
2014 Ontario general election
Party	Candidate	Votes	%	±%
Liberal	Dave Levac	19,346	37.14	+0.06
Progressive Conservative	Phil Gillies	16,041	30.80	-3.85
New Democratic	Alex Felsky	13,992	26.86	+2.66
Green	Ken Burns	2,095	4.02	+1.92
Libertarian	Rob Ferguson	374	0.72	+0.30
Freedom	Brittni Mitchell	179	0.34	+0.04
Pauper	John Turmel	61	0.12	-0.07
Total valid votes		52,088	100.00	
Liberal hold		Swing		+1.96
Source: Elections Ontario

2011 Ontario general election
Party	Candidate	Votes	%	±%
Liberal	Dave Levac	16,867	37.08	-12.10
Progressive Conservative	Michael St. Amant	15,761	34.65	+5.77
New Democratic	Brian Van Tilborg	11,006	24.20	+10.53
Green	Ken Burns	957	2.10	-2.47
Independent	Martin Sitko	244	0.54	
Family Coalition	Daniel Hockley	237	0.52	-0.32
Libertarian	Rob Ferguson	190	0.42	
Freedom	Dustin Jenner	136	0.30	
Independent	John Turmel	86	0.19	-0.38
Total valid votes		45,484	100.00	
Total rejected, unmarked and declined ballots		195	0.43	
Turnout		45,679	48.23	
Eligible voters		94,717		
Liberal hold		Swing		-8.94
Source: Elections Ontario

2007 Ontario general election: Brant
Party	Candidate	Votes	%	±%	Expenditures
Liberal	Dave Levac	23,485	49.16	−2.93	$85,894
Progressive Conservative	Dan McCreary	13,787	28.86	−3.44	$55,566
New Democratic	Brian Van Tilborg	6,536	13.68	+1.70	$18,838
Green	Ted Shelegy	3,272	6.85	–	$7,331
Family Coalition	Rob Ferguson	403	0.84	–	$380
Independent	John Turmel	289	0.60		$0
Total valid votes		47,772	100.00		
Rejected, unmarked and declined ballots		349			
Turnout		48,121	52.69		
Electors on the lists		91,333			

Note: Percentage changes are factored for redistribution. Sources: Official 2007 Poll by Poll Results and 2007 Annual Returns, Candidate and Constituency Associations, Elections Ontario.

2003 Ontario general election: Brant
Party	Candidate	Votes	%	±%	Expenditures
Liberal	Dave Levac	24,236	54.55	–	$51,003
Progressive Conservative	Alayne Sokoloski	13,618	30.65		$49,989
New Democratic	David Noonan	5,262	11.84		$12,461
Green	Mike Clancy	1,014	2.28	–	$1,012
Independent	John Turmel	295	0.66		$0
Total valid votes		44,425	100.00		
Rejected, unmarked and declined ballots		286			
Turnout		44,711	56.14		
Electors on the lists		79,647			

Sources: Ontario Election Returns with Statistics from the Records (2003) and Financial Returns, Candidate and Constituency Associations (2003), Elections Ontario.

1999 Ontario general election
Party	Candidate	Votes	%	±%
Liberal	Dave Levac	21,166	46.98	-
Progressive Conservative	Alayne Sokoloski	20,210	44.86	-
New Democratic	David Sharpe	2,889	6.41	-
Independent	Graham Mcrae	495	1.1	-
Natural Law	Eleanor T. Hyodo	294	0.65	
