= John Wesley Westbrook =

Canadian politician

Ontario MPP
- In office 1911–1914
- Preceded by: John Henry Fisher
- Succeeded by: Thomas Scott Davidson
- Constituency: Brant North

Personal details
- Born: January 28, 1880 Cainsville, Ontario
- Died: October 25, 1934 (aged 54) Brantford, Ontario
- Party: Conservative
- Occupation: Sheriff

John Wesley Westbrook (January 28, 1880 – October 25, 1934) was an Ontario official and political figure. He represented Brant North in the Legislative Assembly of Ontario as a Conservative member from 1911 to 1914.

He was born on the family farm near Cainsville, Ontario, the son of W. D. Westbrook. Westbrook served on the council for Brantford Township and was reeve. He was unsuccessful in his bid for reelection in 1914 and, later that year, was named sheriff for Brant County, serving in that post until his death in Brantford in 1934. Westbrook also served as president of the local Children's Aid Society.
