= Ronald Eddy =

Canadian politician (1931–2026)

Ron Eddy
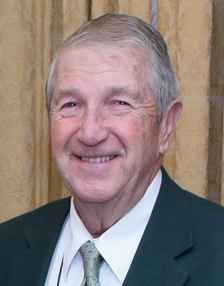

Mayor of Brant
- In office 1999–2018
- Preceded by: Municipality established
- Succeeded by: David Bailey

Member of the Ontario Provincial Parliament for Brant—Haldimand
- In office 1992–1995
- Preceded by: Robert Nixon
- Succeeded by: Peter Preston

Reeve of South Dumfries
- In office 1978–1991

Personal details
- Born: June 21, 1931 Toronto, Ontario, Canada
- Died: April 2, 2026 (aged 94)
- Party: Independent (municipal politicians are elected on a non-partisan basis)
- Other political affiliations: Liberal
- Children: 3
- Occupation: Farmer, administrator

Ronald Earl Foster Eddy (June 21, 1931 – April 2, 2026) was a Canadian politician in Ontario. He was a Liberal member of the Legislative Assembly of Ontario from 1992 to 1995. Eddy represented the riding of Brant—Haldimand, and the mayor of the County of Brant from 1999 to 2018.

== Background ==
Ronald Earl Foster Eddy was born in Toronto, Ontario on June 21, 1931, and raised on a farm near Brantford. He worked as a farmer and municipal administrator. He was a clerk-administrator in Wentworth County, Ontario from 1955 to 1973, and for Middlesex County from 1974 to 1992. He was reeve of South Dumfries Township from 1978 to 1991, and was a councillor in Brant County. On one occasion, he served as president of the Association of Municipalities of Ontario. In 1990, Eddy was president of an international plowing competition.

Eddy died on April 2, 2026, at the age of 94.

== Politics ==
Eddy was elected to the Ontario legislature in a by-election held on March 5, 1992, following the resignation of former Liberal leader Robert Nixon in Brant—Haldimand. Eddy was elected over Progressive Conservative candidate David Timms by almost 5,000 votes.

The Progressive Conservatives won a majority government in the 1995 provincial election, and Eddy lost his seat to PC candidate Peter Preston by about 3,500 votes.

In 1999, Eddy returned to municipal politics and became the mayor of the County of Brant. He also served on the board of directors for Brant County Power and was vice-president of the Children's Aid Society of Brant. Eddy lost re-election to businessman David Bailey in 2018.

== Electoral record ==
2018 Brant mayoral election
Mayoral Candidate	Vote	%
David Bailey	4,478	47.58
Ronald Eddy	3,156	33.54
Don Cardy	1,133	12.04
Shawn Pratt	644	6.84

2014 Brant mayoral election
Mayoral Candidate	Vote	%
Ronald Eddy	5,357	56.77
Roy Haggart	2,508	26.58
Shawn Pratt	1,571	16.65

2010 Brant mayoral election
Mayoral Candidate	Vote	%
Ronald Eddy	3,187	33.65
Steve Comisky	3,048	32.18
John Weaver	1,695	17.89
Roy Haggart	1,155	12.19
Shawn Pratt	387	4.09

2006 Brant mayoral election
Mayoral Candidate	Vote	%
Ronald Eddy	6,300	67.2
Shawn Pratt	3,073	22.8

2003 Brant mayoral election
Mayoral Candidate	Vote	%
Ronald Eddy	4,391	55.02
Steve Comisky	3,590	44.98

1995 Ontario general election: Brant—Haldimand
Party	Candidate	Votes	%	±%
Progressive Conservative	Peter Preston	14,184	47.80	+24.34
Liberal	Ronald Eddy	10,589	35.69	-11.47
New Democratic	Willem Hanrath	3,030	10.21	-4.06
Family Coalition	Steve Elgersma	1,340	4.52	-5.62
Green	Terry Childs	527	1.77	-1.97

1992 Brant—Haldimand by-election
Party	Candidate	Votes	%	±%
Liberal	Ronald Eddy	9,565	47.16	+9.81
Progressive Conservative	David Timms	4,758	23.46	+1.82
New Democratic	Christopher Stanek	2,895	14.27	-17.98
Family Coalition	Don Pennell	2,056	10.14	–
Green	Ella Haley	759	3.74	+0.25
Independent	Janice Wilson	250	1.23	–
Source: Our Campaigns
