= Michigan College of Optometry =

College of Ferris State University

Coordinates: 43°41′05.8″N 85°29′03.3″W

The Michigan College of Optometry is a college affiliated with Ferris State University in Big Rapids, Michigan that specializes in optometry. It is the only college of optometry in Michigan.

The school was established in 1974 by legislation in response to a documented need for optometrists in the state. Currently, each admitted class consists of 38 students and there is a low faculty-to-student ratio.
