= Brantford—Brant (provincial electoral district) =

Provincial electoral district in Ontario, Canada

Coordinates: 43.12°N 80.25°W

Ontario electoral district
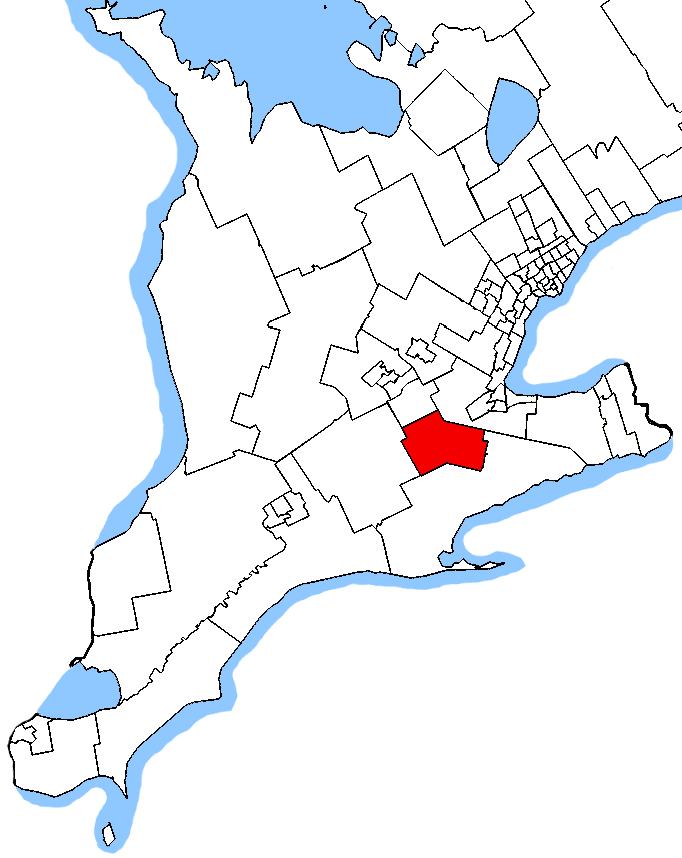
- Brant in relation to other southwestern Ontario electoral districts

Provincial electoral district
- Legislature: Legislative Assembly of Ontario
MPP
Will Bouma
Progressive Conservative
- District created: 1999
- First contested: 1999
- Last contested: 2025

Demographics
- Population (2016): 130,300
- Electors (2018): 102,861
- Area (km²): 844
- Pop. density (per km²): 154.4
- Census division(s): Brant County, Haldimand County
- Census subdivision(s): Brantford, Paris, Brantford Township, South Dumfries, Six Nations 40, New Credit 40A

Brantford—Brant (formerly just Brant) is a provincial electoral district in southwestern, Ontario, Canada. The district elects one member to the Legislative Assembly of Ontario. It was created in 1999 from all of Brantford and part of Brant—Haldimand. When the riding was created, it included the city of Brantford, the town of Paris plus the townships of Brantford and South Dumfries.

The riding existed from 1867 to 1926 as Brant North. It was then merged with Brant South to create Brant County until 1934. The riding was known as Brant—Oxford—Norfolk from 1975 to 1987 and Brant-Haldimand from 1987 to 1999.

In 2007, the boundaries were altered to include all of Brant County, plus that part of the Indian reserves of Six Nations 40 and New Credit 40A located in Haldimand County. For the 2018 election, the riding was renamed Brantford-Brant.

== Boundaries ==
In 1987 the new riding of Brant-Haldimand was created to include Brant County (except the city of Brantford), the township of North Dumfries (excluding the part that extended east of Cambridge), and the municipalities of Haldimand, and Dunnville. In 1996, the riding was abolished into Cambridge, Brant, Haldimand—Norfolk—Brant and Erie—Lincoln.

== Members of Provincial Parliament ==
Brant
Assembly	Years	Member	Party
Riding established as Brant North (see also Brant South)
1st	1867–1871	Hugh Finlayson	Liberal
2nd	1871–1875	Hugh Finlayson	Liberal
3rd	1875–1879	Hugh Finlayson	Liberal
4th	1879–1883	James Young	Liberal
5th	1883–1886	James Young	Liberal
6th	1886–1890	William Bruce Wood	Liberal
7th	1890–1894	William Bruce Wood	Liberal
8th	1894–1898	William Bruce Wood	Liberal
9th	1898–1902	Daniel Burt	Liberal
10th	1902–1904	Daniel Burt	Liberal
11th	1905–1908	John Henry Fisher	Conservative
12th	1908–1911	John Henry Fisher	Conservative
13th	1911–1914	John Wesley Westbrook	Conservative
14th	1914–1919	Thomas Scott Davidson	Liberal
15th	1919–1923	Harry Nixon	United Farmers
16th	1923–1926	Harry Nixon	United Farmers
Brant North and Brant South merged to create Brant County
17th	1926–1929	Harry Nixon	Liberal–Progressive
18th	1929–1934	Harry Nixon	Progressive
Riding renamed to — Brant
19th	1934–1937	Harry Nixon	Liberal–Progressive
20th	1937–1943	Harry Nixon	Liberal
21st	1943–1945	Harry Nixon	Liberal
22nd	1945–1948	Harry Nixon	Liberal
23rd	1948–1951	Harry Nixon	Liberal
24th	1951–1955	Harry Nixon	Liberal
25th	1955–1959	Harry Nixon	Liberal
26th	1959–1961	Harry Nixon	Liberal
26th	1962–1963	Robert Nixon	Liberal
27th	1963–1967	Robert Nixon	Liberal
28th	1967–1971	Robert Nixon	Liberal
29th	1971–1975	Robert Nixon	Liberal
Riding renamed to Brant-Oxford-Norfolk
30th	1975–1977	Robert Nixon	Liberal
31st	1977–1981	Robert Nixon	Liberal
32nd	1981–1985	Robert Nixon	Liberal
33rd	1985–1987	Robert Nixon	Liberal
New riding created - Brant—Haldimand
34th	1987–1990	Robert Nixon	Liberal
35th	1990–1991	Robert Nixon	Liberal
35th	1991–1995	Ronald Eddy	Liberal
36th	1995–1999	Peter Preston	Progressive Conservative
Riding created from Brantford and Brant—Haldimand
37th	1999–2003	Dave Levac	Liberal
38th	2003–2007	Dave Levac	Liberal
39th	2007–2011	Dave Levac	Liberal
40th	2011–2014	Dave Levac	Liberal
41st	2014–2018	Dave Levac	Liberal
Riding renamed to Brantford—Brant
42nd	2018–2022	Will Bouma	Progressive Conservative
43rd	2022–present	Will Bouma	Progressive Conservative

== Election results ==
=== Brantford—Brant (2018–present) ===
Winning party in each polling division of Brantford—Brant at the 2025 Ontario general election

2025 Ontario general election
Party	Candidate	Votes	%	±%	Expenditures
Progressive Conservative	Will Bouma	24,169	47.23	+3.06	$85,032
New Democratic	Harvey Bischof	12,005	23.46	–4.83	$21,786
Liberal	Ron Fox	10,364	20.25	+7.30	$37,606
Green	Karleigh Csordas	2,597	5.08	–1.68	$15,568
New Blue	Joshua Carron	1,138	2.22	–2.23	$1,548
Libertarian	Rob Ferguson	500	0.98	+0.34	$0
None of the Above	Mike Clancy	316	0.62	–	$0
Ontario Alliance	James Carruthers	83	0.16	–	$0
Total valid votes		51,172	99.26		
Total rejected, unmarked and declined ballots		381	0.74	+0.24	
Turnout		51,553	43.41	+1.35	
Eligible voters		118,761			
Progressive Conservative hold		Swing		+3.95	
Source: Elections Ontario

Winning party in each polling division of Brantford—Brant at the 2022 Ontario general election

2022 Ontario general election
Party	Candidate	Votes	%	±%	Expenditures
Progressive Conservative	Will Bouma	20,738	44.17	+2.17	$67,092
New Democratic	Harvey Bischof	13,283	28.29	–12.62	$113,139
Liberal	Ruby Toor	6,083	12.96	+3.41	$33,966
Green	Karleigh Csordas	3,174	6.76	+2.05	$20,258
New Blue	Tad Brudzinski	2,089	4.45	–	$1,726
Ontario Party	Allan Wilson	640	1.36	+0.45	$362
Canadians' Choice	Leslie Bory	490	1.04	+0.60	$0
Libertarian	Rob Ferguson	299	0.64	–0.01	$0
Independent	John Turmel	157	0.33	+0.23	$0
Total valid votes/expense limit		46,953	99.50	–	$157,086
Total rejected, unmarked and declined ballots		234	0.50	–0.55	
Turnout		47,187	42.05	–15.11	
Eligible voters		112,204			
Progressive Conservative hold		Swing		+7.39	
Source: Elections Ontario

2018 Ontario general election
Party	Candidate	Votes	%	±%
Progressive Conservative	Will Bouma	24,437	42.00	+12.07
New Democratic	Alex Felsky	23,802	40.91	+13.76
Liberal	Ruby Toor	5,553	9.54	–28.08
Green	Ken Burns	2,741	4.71	+0.65
Ontario Party	Dave Wrobel	534	0.92	–
None of the Above	Nicholas Archer	424	0.73	–
Libertarian	Rob Ferguson	379	0.65	–0.08
Canadians' Choice	Leslie Bory	258	0.44	–
Pauper	John Turmel	60	0.10	–0.02
Total valid votes		58,188	98.95	
Total rejected, unmarked and declined ballots		617	1.05	–
Turnout		58,805	57.17	–
Eligible voters		102,861		
Progressive Conservative gain from Liberal		Swing		+20.08
Source: Elections Ontario

=== Brant (1999–2014) ===
2014 Ontario general election: Brant
Party	Candidate	Votes	%	±%
Liberal	Dave Levac	19,396	37.63	+0.55
Progressive Conservative	Phil Gillies	15,447	29.97	–4.68
New Democratic	Alex Felsky	13,992	27.15	+2.95
Green	Ken Burns	2,095	4.06	+1.96
Libertarian	Rob Ferguson	374	0.73	+0.31
Freedom	Brittni Mitchell	180	0.35	+0.05
Pauper	John Turmel	60	0.12	–0.07
Total valid votes		51,544	98.58	
Total rejected, unmarked and declined ballots		740	1.42	+0.99
Turnout		52,284	52.51	+4.29
Eligible voters		99,564		
Liberal hold		Swing		+2.61
Source: Elections Ontario

2011 Ontario general election: Brant
Party	Candidate	Votes	%	±%
Liberal	Dave Levac	16,867	37.08	–12.08
Progressive Conservative	Michael St. Amant	15,761	34.65	+5.79
New Democratic	Brian Van Tilborg	11,006	24.20	+10.52
Green	Ken Burns	957	2.10	–4.75
Independent	Martin Sitko	244	0.54	–
Family Coalition	Daniel Hockley	237	0.52	–0.32
Libertarian	Rob Ferguson	190	0.42	–0.43
Freedom	Dustin Jenner	136	0.30	–
Pauper	John Turmel	86	0.19	–0.42
Total valid votes		45,484	99.57	
Total rejected, unmarked and declined ballots		195	0.43	–0.30
Turnout		45,679	48.23	–4.46
Eligible voters		94,717		
Liberal hold		Swing		–8.93
Source: Elections Ontario

2007 Ontario general election: Brant
Party	Candidate	Votes	%	±%	Expenditures
Liberal	Dave Levac	23,485	49.16	–5.39	$85,894
Progressive Conservative	Dan McCreary	13,787	28.86	–1.79	$55,566
New Democratic	Brian Van Tilborg	6,536	13.68	+1.84	$18,838
Green	Ted Shelegy	3,272	6.85	+4.57	$7,331
Family Coalition	Rob Ferguson	403	0.84	–	$380
Independent	John Turmel	289	0.60	–0.06	$0
Total valid votes		47,772	99.27		
Total rejected, unmarked and declined ballots		349	0.73	+0.09	
Turnout		48,121	52.69	–3.45	
Eligible voters		91,333			
Liberal hold		Swing		–1.80	
Source: Elections Ontario

2003 Ontario general election: Brant
Party	Candidate	Votes	%	±%	Expenditures
Liberal	Dave Levac	24,236	54.55	+7.58	$51,003
Progressive Conservative	Alayne Sokoloski	13,618	30.65	–14.20	$49,989
New Democratic	David Noonan	5,262	11.84	+5.43	$12,461
Green	Mike Clancy	1,014	2.28	–	$1,012
Independent	John Turmel	295	0.66	–	$0
Total valid votes		44,425	99.36		
Total rejected, unmarked and declined ballots		286	0.64	–0.31	
Turnout		44,711	56.14	–3.57	
Eligible voters		79,647			
Liberal hold		Swing		+10.89	
Source: Elections Ontario

1999 Ontario general election: Brant
Party	Candidate	Votes	%	±%
Liberal	Dave Levac	21,166	46.98	–
Progressive Conservative	Alayne Sokoloski	20,210	44.86	–
New Democratic	David Sharpe	2,889	6.41	–
Independent	Graham McRae	495	1.10	–
Natural Law	Eleanor Toshiko Hyodo	294	0.65	–
Total valid votes		45,054	99.05	
Total rejected, unmarked and declined ballots		430	0.95	+0.48
Turnout		45,484	59.71	–13.60
Eligible voters		76,177		
Liberal hold		Swing		–
Source: Elections Ontario

=== Brant—Haldimand (1987–1999) ===
1995 Ontario general election: Brant—Haldimand
Party	Candidate	Votes	%	±%
Progressive Conservative	Peter Preston	14,184	47.81	+24.35
Liberal	Ronald Eddy	10,589	35.69	–11.47
New Democratic	Willem Hanrath	3,030	10.21	–4.06
Family Coalition	Stephen Elgersma	1,340	4.52	–5.62
Green	Terry Childs	527	1.78	–1.97
Total valid votes		29,670	98.57	
Total rejected, unmarked and declined ballots		430	1.43	+0.72
Turnout		30,100	61.67	+18.37
Eligible voters		48,807		
Progressive Conservative gain from Liberal		Swing		+17.91
Source: Elections Ontario

Ontario provincial by-election, March 5, 1992: Brant—Haldimand Resignation of Robert Nixon
Party	Candidate	Votes	%	±%
Liberal	Ronald Eddy	9,565	47.16	+9.81
Progressive Conservative	David Timms	4,758	23.46	+1.82
New Democratic	Christopher Stanek	2,895	14.27	–17.97
Family Coalition	Donald Pennell	2,056	10.14	+4.86
Green	Ella Haley	759	3.74	+0.25
Independent	Janice Wilson	250	1.23	–
Total valid votes		20,283	99.29	
Total rejected, unmarked and declined ballots		145	0.71	–0.90
Turnout		20,428	43.30	–17.88
Eligible voters		47,180		
Liberal hold		Swing		+3.99
Source: Elections Ontario

1990 Ontario general election: Brant—Haldimand
Party	Candidate	Votes	%	±%
Liberal	Robert Nixon	10,751	37.35	–22.00
New Democratic	Christopher Stanek	9,282	32.25	+12.47
Progressive Conservative	Brett A. Kelly	6,228	21.64	+3.50
Family Coalition	Stephen Elgersma	1,520	5.28	–
Green	Jamie Legacey	1,004	3.49	–
Total valid votes		28,785	98.39	
Total rejected, unmarked and declined ballots		470	1.61	+1.02
Turnout		29,255	61.18	+4.41
Eligible voters		47,819		
Liberal hold		Swing		–17.23
Source: Elections Ontario

1987 Ontario general election: Brant—Haldimand
Party	Candidate	Votes	%	±%
Liberal	Robert Nixon	14,981	59.34	–2.87
New Democratic	Tracey Macdonnell	4,992	19.77	+5.61
Progressive Conservative	Ann Wilson	4,578	18.14	–5.49
Independent	George Molson Barrett	693	2.75	–
Total valid votes		25,244	99.42	
Total rejected ballots		148	0.58	–
Turnout		25,392	56.77	–
Eligible voters		44,730		
Liberal hold		Swing		–4.24
Source: Elections Ontario

=== Brant—Oxford—Norfolk (1975–1987) ===
1985 Ontario general election: Brant—Oxford—Norfolk
Party	Candidate	Votes	%	±%
Liberal	Robert Nixon	15,317	62.21	+2.82
Progressive Conservative	Ian A. Birnie	5,817	23.63	–3.80
New Democratic	Irene Heltner	3,487	14.16	+0.99
Total valid votes		24,621	99.62	
Total rejected ballots		95	0.38	+0.06
Turnout		24,716	60.29	+4.76
Eligible voters		40,995		
Liberal hold		Swing		+3.31
Source: Elections Ontario

1981 Ontario general election: Brant—Oxford—Norfolk
Party	Candidate	Votes	%	±%
Liberal	Robert Nixon	13,067	59.40	+1.98
Progressive Conservative	Ian A. Birnie	6,034	27.43	+4.02
New Democratic	W. E. Jefferies	2,899	13.18	–5.99
Total valid votes		22,000	99.67	
Total rejected ballots		72	0.33	–0.02
Turnout		22,072	55.53	–9.47
Eligible voters		39,750		
Liberal hold		Swing		–1.02
Source: Elections Ontario

1977 Ontario general election: Brant—Oxford—Norfolk
Party	Candidate	Votes	%	±%
Liberal	Robert Nixon	14,256	57.42	+1.90
Progressive Conservative	A. Clare Huffman	5,812	23.41	–1.43
New Democratic	Jim Schneider	4,760	19.17	+0.92
Total valid votes		24,828	99.66	
Total rejected ballots		85	0.34	–0.08
Turnout		24,913	65.00	–4.63
Eligible voters		38,328		
Liberal hold		Swing		+1.67
Source: Elections Ontario

1975 Ontario general election: Brant—Oxford—Norfolk
Party	Candidate	Votes	%	±%
Liberal	Robert Nixon	14,358	55.52	+4.54
Progressive Conservative	Don Harder	6,424	24.84	–4.82
New Democratic	Jim Schneider	4,721	18.26	–1.10
Social Credit	Ancel Kerr	358	1.38	–
Total valid votes		25,861	99.58	
Total rejected ballots		110	0.42	–
Turnout		25,971	69.63	–
Eligible voters		37,299		
Liberal hold		Swing		+4.68
Source: Elections Ontario

=== Brant (1934–1975) ===
1971 Ontario general election: Brant
Party	Candidate	Votes	%	±%
Liberal	Robert Nixon	8,846	50.98	–6.23
Progressive Conservative	J. Pryor Harris	5,147	29.66	–0.74
New Democratic	Dave Neumann	3,359	19.36	+6.97
Total valid votes		17,352	99.54	
Total rejected ballots		81	0.46	–0.02
Turnout		17,433	73.31	+5.87
Eligible voters		23,780		
Liberal hold		Swing		–2.75
Source: Elections Ontario

1967 Ontario general election: Brant
Party	Candidate	Votes	%	±%
Liberal	Robert Nixon	7,859	57.21	+1.90
Progressive Conservative	J. Pryor Harris	4,176	30.40	–5.44
New Democratic	Suzanne Blackburn	1,702	12.39	+3.53
Total valid votes		13,737	99.51	
Total rejected ballots		67	0.49	+0.13
Turnout		13,804	67.44	+6.68
Eligible voters		20,470		
Liberal hold		Swing		+3.67
Source: Elections Ontario

1963 Ontario general election: Brant
Party	Candidate	Votes	%	±%
Liberal	Robert Nixon	10,771	55.31	+3.72
Progressive Conservative	Arthur McNeil	6,979	35.84	+6.85
New Democratic	Harry Sanders	1,725	8.86	–10.57
Total valid votes		19,475	99.65	
Total rejected ballots		69	0.35	–0.27
Turnout		19,544	60.75	–3.97
Eligible voters		32,169		
Liberal hold		Swing		–1.57
Source: Elections Ontario

Ontario provincial by-election, January 18, 1962: Brant Death of Harry Nixon
Party	Candidate	Votes	%	±%
Liberal	Robert Nixon	10,379	51.59	+4.16
Progressive Conservative	Garnet Brown	5,832	28.99	–11.94
New Democratic	Robert G. Good	3,909	19.43	+7.77
Total valid votes		20,120	99.37	
Total rejected ballots		127	0.63	–0.10
Turnout		20,247	64.73	+4.92
Eligible voters		31,280		
Liberal hold		Swing		+8.05
Source: Elections Ontario

1959 Ontario general election: Brant
Party	Candidate	Votes	%	±%
Liberal	Harry Nixon	8,512	47.42	–4.64
Progressive Conservative	Garnet Brown	7,346	40.92	+8.58
Co-operative Commonwealth	Charlie L. MacKay	2,092	11.65	–3.94
Total valid votes		17,950	99.27	
Total rejected ballots		132	0.73	+0.01
Turnout		18,082	59.81	–0.47
Eligible voters		30,231		
Liberal hold		Swing		–6.61
Source: Elections Ontario

1955 Ontario general election: Brant
Party	Candidate	Votes	%	±%
Liberal	Harry Nixon	8,582	52.06	+4.58
Progressive Conservative	Stanley Force	5,331	32.34	–4.77
Co-operative Commonwealth	David L. Ritchie	2,571	15.60	+0.20
Total valid votes		16,484	99.28	
Total rejected ballots		120	0.72	–0.18
Turnout		16,604	60.28	–10.12
Eligible voters		27,544		
Liberal hold		Swing		+4.68
Source: Elections Ontario

1951 Ontario general election: Brant
Party	Candidate	Votes	%	±%
Liberal	Harry Nixon	8,218	47.49	–18.08
Progressive Conservative	Ivie Samuel McClure	6,423	37.11	+2.68
Co-operative Commonwealth	Walter L. Townsend	2,665	15.40	–
Total valid votes		17,306	99.10	
Total rejected ballots		158	0.90	–0.11
Turnout		17,464	70.41	+6.63
Eligible voters		24,805		
Liberal hold		Swing		–10.38
Source: Elections Ontario

1948 Ontario general election: Brant
Party	Candidate	Votes	%	±%
Liberal	Harry Nixon	9,557	65.56	+17.88
Progressive Conservative	Clayton Alexander Honey	5,020	34.44	–5.30
Total valid votes		14,577	98.98	
Total rejected ballots		150	1.02	+0.24
Turnout		14,727	63.78	–5.53
Eligible voters		23,092		
Liberal hold		Swing		+11.59
Source: Elections Ontario

1945 Ontario general election: Brant
Party	Candidate	Votes	%	±%
Liberal	Harry Nixon	7,151	47.68	–9.11
Progressive Conservative	John P. Fraser	5,960	39.74	+17.60
Co-operative Commonwealth	J. Gordon Johnson	1,886	12.58	–8.49
Total valid votes		14,997	99.23	
Total rejected ballots		117	0.77	+0.10
Turnout		15,114	69.30	+17.26
Eligible voters		21,808		
Liberal hold		Swing		–13.35
Source: Elections Ontario

1943 Ontario general election: Brant
Party	Candidate	Votes	%	±%
Liberal	Harry Nixon	5,745	56.79	–18.14
Progressive Conservative	Sydney Rogers	2,240	22.14	–2.93
Co-operative Commonwealth	William Cuthbert	2,131	21.07	–
Total valid votes		10,116	99.32	
Total rejected ballots		69	0.68	–0.26
Turnout		10,185	52.05	–11.47
Eligible voters		19,568		
Liberal hold		Swing		–10.53
Source: Elections Ontario

1937 Ontario general election: Brant
Party	Candidate	Votes	%	±%
Liberal	Harry Nixon	9,115	74.93	+6.28
Conservative	Johnston A. Walker	3,050	25.07	–6.28
Total valid votes		12,165	99.06	
Total rejected ballots		115	0.94	+0.38
Turnout		12,280	63.52	–7.17
Eligible voters		19,334		
Liberal gain from Liberal–Progressive		Swing		+6.28
Source: Elections Ontario

1934 Ontario general election: Brant
Party	Candidate	Votes	%	±%
Liberal–Progressive	Harry Nixon	9,402	68.65	–
Conservative	Edmond P. Randle	4,294	31.35	–
Total valid votes		13,696	99.44	
Total rejected ballots		77	0.56	–
Turnout		13,773	70.69	–
Eligible voters		19,485		
Liberal–Progressive hold		Swing		–
Source: Elections Ontario

=== Brant County (1926–1929) ===
1929 Ontario general election: Brant County
Party	Candidate	Votes	%	±%
Progressive	Harry Nixon	3,831	53.42	–2.28
Conservative	William A. Douglas	3,341	46.58	+2.28
Total valid votes		7,172	99.34	
Total rejected ballots		48	0.66	–0.35
Turnout		7,220	71.65	+0.91
Eligible voters		10,077		
Progressive hold		Swing		–2.28
Source: Elections Ontario

1926 Ontario general election: Brant County
Party	Candidate	Votes	%	±%
Progressive	Harry Nixon	4,114	55.70	–
Conservative	William Harper Reid	3,272	44.30	–
Total valid votes		7,386	98.98	
Total rejected ballots		76	1.02	–
Turnout		7,462	70.74	–
Eligible voters		10,549		
Progressive hold		Swing		–
Source: Elections Ontario

=== Brant North (1867–1923) ===
1923 Ontario general election: Brant North
Party	Candidate	Votes	%	±%
United Farmers	Harry Nixon	3,617	50.36	–
Conservative	John M. Patterson	3,565	49.64	–
Total valid votes		7,182	97.97	
Total rejected ballots		149	2.03	–
Turnout		7,331	62.04	–
Eligible voters		11,817		
United Farmers hold		Swing		–
Source: Elections Ontario

Ontario provincial by-election, December 15, 1919: Brant North Ministerial by-election
Party	Candidate	Votes
United Farmers	Harry Nixon	acclaimed
Source: Elections Ontario

1919 Ontario general election: Brant North
Party	Candidate	Votes	%	±%
United Farmers	Harry Nixon	3,597	44.21	–
Conservative	Franklin Smoke	2,573	31.62	–17.75
Liberal	Uzziel Ogden Kendrick	1,966	24.16	–26.46
Total valid votes		8,136	95.49	
Total rejected ballots		384	4.51	+3.97
Turnout		8,520	76.65	–12.14
Eligible voters		11,115		
United Farmers gain from Liberal		Swing		+8.88
Source: Elections Ontario

1914 Ontario general election: Brant North
Party	Candidate	Votes	%	±%
Liberal	Thomas Scott Davidson	1,987	50.62	+3.32
Conservative	John Wesley Westbrook	1,938	49.38	–3.32
Total valid votes		3,925	99.47	
Total rejected ballots		21	0.53	+0.20
Turnout		3,946	88.79	+19.98
Eligible voters		4,444		
Liberal gain from Conservative		Swing		+3.32
Source: Elections Ontario

1911 Ontario general election: Brant North
Party	Candidate	Votes	%	±%
Conservative	John Wesley Westbrook	1,722	52.69	–1.99
Liberal	James Rufus Layton	1,546	47.31	+1.99
Total valid votes		3,268	99.66	
Total rejected ballots		11	0.34	–0.16
Turnout		3,279	68.81	–20.33
Eligible voters		4,765		
Conservative hold		Swing		–1.99
Source: Elections Ontario

1908 Ontario general election: Brant North
Party	Candidate	Votes	%	±%
Conservative	John Henry Fisher	1,850	54.69	+3.34
Liberal	George Laidlaw Telfer	1,533	45.31	–3.34
Total valid votes		3,383	99.50	
Total rejected ballots		17	0.50	+0.13
Turnout		3,400	89.15	+5.57
Eligible voters		3,814		
Conservative hold		Swing		+3.34
Source: Elections Ontario

1905 Ontario general election: Brant North
Party	Candidate	Votes	%	±%
Conservative	John Henry Fisher	1,242	51.34	+4.71
Liberal	Daniel Burt	1,177	48.66	–4.71
Total valid votes		2,419	99.63	
Total rejected ballots		9	0.37	–0.51
Turnout		2,428	83.58	+5.11
Eligible voters		2,905		
Conservative gain from Liberal		Swing		+4.71
Source: Elections Ontario

1902 Ontario general election: Brant North
Party	Candidate	Votes	%	±%
Liberal	Daniel Burt	1,205	53.37	+1.08
Conservative	John Henry Fisher	1,053	46.63	–1.08
Total valid votes		2,258	99.12	
Total rejected ballots		20	0.88	+0.88
Turnout		2,278	78.47	–5.06
Eligible voters		2,903		
Liberal hold		Swing		+1.08
Source: Elections Ontario

1898 Ontario general election: Brant North
Party	Candidate	Votes	%	±%
Liberal	Daniel Burt	1,167	52.28	–
Conservative	John Henry Fisher	1,065	47.72	–
Total valid votes		2,232	100.00	
Total rejected ballots		–		
Turnout		2,232	83.53	–
Eligible voters		2,672		
Liberal hold		Swing		–
Source: Elections Ontario

Ontario provincial by-election, May 20, 1895: Brant North Resignation of William Bruce Wood
Party	Candidate	Votes
Liberal	Daniel Burt	acclaimed
Source: Elections Ontario

1894 Ontario general election: Brant North
Party	Candidate	Votes	%	±%
Liberal	William Bruce Wood	1,192	61.44	–2.75
Liberal-Patrons of Industry	S. G. Kitchen	748	38.56	–
Total valid votes		1,940	100.00	
Total rejected ballots		–		
Turnout		1,940	77.41	+10.87
Eligible voters		2,506		
Liberal hold		Swing		–1.38
Source: Elections Ontario

1890 Ontario general election: Brant North
Party	Candidate	Votes	%	±%
Liberal	William Bruce Wood	1,178	64.20	+3.33
Conservative	Robert Hamilton	657	35.80	–3.33
Total valid votes		1,835	99.84	
Total rejected ballots		3	0.16	+0.16
Turnout		1,838	66.55	+11.13
Eligible voters		2,762		
Liberal hold		Swing		+3.33
Source: Elections Ontario

1886 Ontario general election: Brant North
Party	Candidate	Votes	%	±%
Liberal	William Bruce Wood	1,025	60.87	–5.98
Conservative	William Turnbull	659	39.13	–
Total valid votes		1,684	100.00	
Total rejected ballots		–		
Turnout		1,684	55.41	–
Eligible voters		3,039		
Liberal hold		Swing		–2.99
Source: Elections Ontario

Ontario provincial by-election, June 16, 1883: Brant North
Party	Candidate	Votes	%	±%
Liberal	James Young	1,093	66.85	–
Unknown	Mr. Strickland	542	33.15	–
Total valid votes		1,635	100.00	
Total rejected ballots		–		
Turnout		1,635	–	
Eligible voters				
Liberal hold		Swing		–
Source: Elections Ontario

1883 Ontario general election: Brant North
Party	Candidate	Votes
Liberal	James Young	acclaimed
Source: Elections Ontario

1879 Ontario general election
Party	Candidate	Votes	%	±%
Liberal	James Young	990	60.37	+6.20
Conservative	H.A. Baird	650	39.63	–6.20
Total valid votes		1,640	66.80	+4.26
Eligible voters		2,455		
Liberal hold		Swing		+6.20
Source: Elections Ontario

1875 Ontario general election
Party	Candidate	Votes	%	±%
Liberal	Hugh Finlayson	747	54.17	−6.09
Conservative	J.S. Crawford	632	45.83	+6.09
Turnout		1,379	62.54	+1.81
Eligible voters		2,205		
Liberal hold		Swing		−6.09
Source: Elections Ontario

1871 Ontario general election
Party	Candidate	Votes	%	±%
Liberal	Hugh Finlayson	740	60.26	+7.10
Conservative	Mr. la Pierre	488	39.74	–7.10
Turnout		1,228	60.73	–11.96
Eligible voters		2,022		
Liberal hold		Swing		+7.10
Source: Elections Ontario

1867 Ontario general election
Party	Candidate	Votes	%
Liberal	Hugh Finlayson	706	53.16
Conservative	W. Turnbull	622	46.84
Total valid votes		1,328	72.69
Eligible voters		1,827	
Liberal pickup new district.			
Source: Elections Ontario

== 2007 electoral reform referendum ==
2007 Ontario electoral reform referendum
Side	Votes	%
First Past the Post	30,237	65.1
Mixed member proportional	16,194	34.9
Total valid votes	46,431	100.0

== See also ==
- List of Ontario provincial electoral districts
- Canadian provincial electoral districts

== Sources ==
- Elections Ontario Past Election Results
- Map of Brantford-Brant riding for 2018 election
