= Pauper Party of Ontario =

- Former provincial party
- Leader: John Turmel
- President: Wayne Robinson
- Founder: John Turmel
- Founded: September 14, 2011
- Preceded by: Abolitionist Party of Canada
- Headquarters: 50 Brant Ave. Brantford, Ontario; N3T 3G7
- Ideology: Social credit; Monetary reform; Libertarianism
- Political position: Big tent
- Colours: Canary Yellow
- Seats in Legislature: 0 / 107

Website
- johnturmel.com/paupers.htm

The Pauper Party of Ontario (French: Parti Pauvre de l’Ontario) is a former libertarian-populist political party in the Canadian province of Ontario based on the principles of social credit. Registered in 2011, the party was led by perennial candidate John Turmel.

== History ==
Turmel founded the party in 2011, opting to run in Ontario's provincial election that year under the slogan "we want no cops in gambling, sex or drugs or rock and roll, we want no usury on loans, pay cash or time, no dole". During the campaign, Turmel characterized the policies of the party as "social credit libertarian". Turmel's economic policies focused on what he called the "Argentine solution", based on the policies of the de la Rúa administration in Argentina, which involved the issuing of government bonds to civil employees.

In the 2011 election, Turmel stood in the constituency of Brant while another party candidate, Michael Spottiswood received 54 votes in London North Centre.

Following the 2011 vote, Turmel stood in by-elections in Kitchener–Waterloo, in 2012, Ottawa South in 2013, and Thornhill in 2014.

In the 2014 provincial election, Turmel again stood in Brant, receiving 60 votes. Spottiswood again sought election in London North Centre, and received 70 votes. Another party candidate, Michael Faux, received 52 votes in the riding of Peterborough.

Following the 2014 election, Turmel again stood in three provincial by-elections, including contests in Simcoe North and Sudbury in 2015, and Ottawa-Vanier in 2016.

In both the Simcoe North and Ottawa-Vanier by-elections, Turmel was removed from all-candidates debates by local authorities after seizing the podium and disrupting proceedings.

The party's platform was to legalize gambling, legalize marijuana and institute monetary reform and bartering in the form of the Local Exchange Trading System.

The party de-registered before the 2022 election.

== Election results ==
Election results
Election year	# of overall votes	% of overall total	No. of candidates run	No. of seats won	+/−	Government
2018	111	nil	2	0 / 124	0	Extra-parliamentary
2014	194	nil	3	0 / 107	0	Extra-parliamentary
2011	140	nil	2	0 / 107	New Party	Extra-parliamentary
