= List of numbered roads in Elgin County =

List of county roads

This article lists all of the numbered county roads in Elgin County, Ontario, Canada.

Number	Names	Western/Southern Terminus	Eastern/Northern Terminus	Major Communities	Comments	
2	Pioneer Line, Main Street	CR 103 (Furnival Road) in Rodney, Ontario	CR 8 in Dutton, Ontario	Rodney, West Lorne, Dutton	Closely follows Highway 401 Is not related to Highway 2 in any way.	
3	Talbot Line, Talbot Road, St. Thomas Expressway	MacPherson Road (Boundary with Chatham-Kent)	Intersection with Highway 3, Highway 4, and CR 4	Talbotville Royal, St. Thomas, Aylmer	Decommissioned portion of Highway 3, that was turned back in 1998.	
4	Sunset Road, Sunset Drive, Colborne Street, Joseph Street, George Street	CR 20 (Carlow Road) in Port Stanley	Intersection with Highway 3, Highway 4, and CR 3	St. Thomas, Norman, Union, Port Stanley	Decommissioned portion of Hwy 4, south of Highway 3 in 1998.	
5	Dunborough Road	Lakeview Line	Thames River (Boundary between Middlesex and Elgin Counties.)		Township border between Dutton/Dunwich and West Elgin	
7	Clachan Road	Clachan (On the Chatham-Kent/Elgin County Boundary)	Walnut Drive/Thames River (Middlesex/Elgin County Boundary)	Clachan	Dual-designation with Chatham-Kent CR 121. Continues as Middlesex CR 14 (Clachan Road, Concession Drive).	
8	Currie Road	John E. Pearce Provincial Park (south of CR 3 (Talbot Line))	Thamesi River (Boundary between Middlesex and Elgin Counties. Continues as Middlesex CR 8 (Thames Road))	Dutton	Portion from CR 3 to Dutton, Ontario was former Highway 75, from September 16, 1936 to December 6, 1957.	
9	McDougall Line, Colley Road, Stalker Line, Dunborough Road, Duff Line	CR 103 (Furnival Road)	CR 14 (Iona Road)			
11	Clinton Line	Hwy 4	CR 29 (Wonderland Road)	Talbotville Royal/Southwold		
13	Shackleton Street, Shackleton Line	CR 8 (Main Street) in Dutton	CR 14 (Iona Road) in Iona Station			
14	Iona Road	CR 16 (Fingal Line) in Burwells Corner	Thames River (Middlesex/Elgin County Boundary, continues as Middlesex CR 9)	Iona, Iona Station		
15	Miller Road	CR 2 (Pioneer Line)	CR 8 (Currie Road)	Dutton		
16	Fingal Line, "Talbot Historical Trail"	CR 8 (Currie Road), south of CR 3 (Talbot Line)	Sunset Drive (St. Thomas City Limits)		Designated as part of the "Talbot Historical Trail" from CR 14 to St. Thomas.	
18	3rd Line, Southminster Bourne	CR 14 (Iona Road)	Hwy 4		Crosses into Middlesex County (specifically, London) briefly over Highway 401 overpass	
19	Plank Road, Robinson Street	CR 42 (Bridge Street/Nova Scotia Line)	Baynor Drive/Bayham-Norfolk Boundary Road (Boundary with City of Norfolk County, continuing as Norfolk CR HWY 19)	Port Burwell, Vienna, Staffordville, Eden, Tillsonburg (on the other side of the Norfolk County boundary)	Formerly a part of Highway 19, before parts south of Highway 3 in Tillsonburg, Ontario were turned back, bringing the highway's length to basically the same as when it was created, in 1930. The only difference is that it ends at the Interchange with Highway 401, as opposed to travelling the additional 13.2 km into Ingersoll, Ontario to end at Highway 2.	
20	Union Road, Carlow Road	CR 4 (Bridge Street) in Port Stanley	CR 18 (Third Line)	Port Stanley, Shedden	Formerly extended north of CR 18 along Magdala Road. Shortened in 2017	
21	Warren Street	CR 20 (Carlow Road/Union Road)	CR 4 (Colborne Street/Sunset Road)	Port Stanley	Short county road, linking CR 20 to CR 4	
22	Fairview Road, Fairview Avenue,	CR 24 (Dexter Line)	CR 57 (Southdale Line) just south of St. Thomas	St. Thomas	Continues north of Southdale Line as Fairview Avenue, and continues south of Dexter Line as Hawk Cliff Road	
23	Joseph Street, East Road	CR 24 (Dexter Line)	CR 4 (North End; Sunset Road)(South End; Colborne Street)	Port Stanley	Offers a direct route into Port Stanley from the east	
24	Dexter Line	CR 23 (East Road)	CR 73 (Imperial Road)	Port Stanley, Dexter, Port Bruce	Links two former highways ( Highway 4, and Highway 73, and travels close to Lake Erie	
25	Wellington Road	Sunset Drive/Talbot Hill (Designation ends within St. Thomas City Limits)	Reagan Bourne (Boundary with London)	St. Thomas		
26	St. George Street	CR 25 (Wellington Road)	St. Thomas City Limits	St. Thomas		
27	Sparta Line	CR 20 (Union Road)	CR 36 (Quaker Road)	Port Stanley, Union, Lawton's Corners, Sparta	CR 20	
28	Centennial Road/Centennial Avenue	Hwy 3 (Centennial Avenue)	CR 45 (John Wise Line)	Highway 3	St. Thomas	The Hwy 3 portion leads directly to Highbury Avenue, and to London. Marks part of the boundary between Elgin County and St. Thomas.
29	Wonderland Road	CR 52 (Ron McNeil Line)	Southminster Bourne (City of London boundary)		Uploaded to the County of Elgin from the Township of Southwold in 2017.	
30	Highbury Avenue	CR 52 (Ron McNeil Line)	Webber Bourne/Thomson Line (London London City Limits)	St. Thomas, London	Continues directly to Hwy 3	
31	Dalewood Road	St. Thomas City Limits	CR 52 (Ron McNeil Line)	St. Thomas		
32	Glencolin Line, Hacienda Road	CR 73 (Imperial Road), 2 km north of Aylmer	CR 52 (Ron McNeil Line), 2 km west of Springfield	Aylmer, Springfield		
34	Borden Avenue	London City Limits (where it becomes and continues as Glanworth Drive)	CR 74 (Belmont Road)	Belmont		
35	Springwater Road	CR 45 (John Wise Line) in Jaffa	CR 52 (Ron McNeil Line)	Jaffa, Orwell		
36	Quaker Road	CR 24 (Dexter Line)	Hwy 3 just west of New Sarum	Sparta		
37	Caesar Road, Avon Drive	CR 74 (Belmont Road) in Belmont	Pigram Road (Oxford County/Elgin County boundary)	Belmont, Avon	Also acts as the county boundary for Middlesex and Elgin Counties	
38	Heritage Line, "Talbot Historical Trail"	Hwy 3	"Baynor Road"/CR 55 (No name) (Boundary between Norfolk County and Elgin County)	Staffordville	Continues into Norfolk County as Norfolk CR 38	
39	Chatham Street	Dead end at Lake Erie	CR 42 (Bridge St/Nova Scotia Line)	Port Burwell	Very short County Road	
40	Springfield Road	CR 42 (Nova Scotia Line)	CR 52 (Ron McNeil Line) in Springfield			
41	Edison Drive, Fulton Street	Centre Street	CR 19 (Plank Road)	Vienna	Very short county road	
42	Nova Scotia Line, Bridge Street, Glen Erie Line, Elgin CR 55)	CR 73 (Imperial Road) in Copenhagen	Elgin CR 55/Norfolk CR 26 ("Baynor Road", the Norfolk/Elgin County boundary) (Short jog along Elgin CR 55 (“Baynor Road”), continuing as Norfolk CR 42 at Lakeshore Road (Norfolk CR 42))	Port Burwell		
43	Richmond Road	CR 42 (Nova Scotia Line)	CR 38 (Heritage Line)			
44	Eden Line	CR 46 (Culloden Road)	CR 19 (Plank Road)	Eden		
45	John Wise Line, Calton Line, (Short jog on CR 40 (Springfield Road))	CR 3 (Talbot Line)	Elgin CR 55/Norfolk CR 26 ("Baynor Road", the Norfolk/Elgin County boundary)	Norman, Jaffa	Continues as Norfolk CR 45	
46	Culloden Road	CR 38 (Heritage Line)	Pressey Line (Oxford/Elgin County boundary)	Corinth	Continues as Oxford CR 10	
47	Putnam Road	CR 48 (Lyons Line)	CR 37 (Avon Drive) at Avon, Ontario	Avon, Mount Vernon	Continues as Middlesex CR 30	
48	Ferguson Line, Lyons Line	CR 29 (Wonderland Road)	Elgin CR 54 (Pigram Road)/Oxford CR 26 (Pigram Line)	Lyons	Basically a continuation of CR 54	
49	Whittaker Road	CR 52 (Ron McNeil Line)	CR 48 (Lyons Line)	Springfield		
50	Victoria Street	CR 142 (Wellington Street)	CR 19 (Plank Road/Robinson Street)	Port Burwell	Short county road	
51	Fruit Ridge Line	Mellor Road in Whites, ON	CR 4 (Sunset Road)	Whites	Very short county road	
52	Ron McNeil Line	Hwy 3	CR 54 (Pigram Road)	St. Thomas		
53	Elm Street, Beech Street	Highway 3	CR 73 (John Street)	Aylmer	Designated truck route	
54	Pigram Road	CR 52 (Ron McNeil Line)	JCT with Oxford CR 20 (Brownsville Road) CR 48 (Lyons Line)		Dual-designation with Oxford CR 26, between Elgin CR 48 (Lyons Line) and Oxford CR 20 (Brownsville Road)	
55	"Baynor Road"/Elgin County Road 55	Elgin CR 42/Norfolk CR 42	Elgin CR 38/Norfolk CR 38		No official name, other than Elgin CR 55. Dual-designation with Norfolk CR 26.	
56	Elm Line	CR 28 (Centennial Avenue/Centennial Road)	CR 36 (Quaker Road)	Just outside St. Thomas	Continues into St. Thomas as Elm Street.	
57	Southdale Line	CR 4 (Sunset Drive)	CR 22 (Fairview Road/Fairview Avenue)	Enters St. Thomas City Limits briefly.	Marks part of the boundary between Elgin County and St. Thomas	
73	Imperial Road, John Street	Collin Street in Port Bruce	CR 37 (Avon Drive)	Port Bruce, Aylmer, Little Aylmer, Lyons	Continues into Middlesex County as Middlesex CR 73 (Elgin Road) Formerly Highway 73 turned back in 1998.	
74	Belmont Road	Highway 3	CR 37 (Avon Drive/Caesar Road) in Belmont	Belmont, New Sarum, Mapleton	Continues into Middlesex County as Middlesex CR 74 (Westchester Bourne) Formerly Highway 74 turned back in 1998.	
76	Graham Road	CR 3 (Talbot Line)	Thames River. (Continues as Middlesex CR 76)	West Lorne	Formerly Highway 76 turned back in 1998.	
103	Furnival Road	Port Glasgow (South of CR 3 (Talbot Line))	Thames River (Proceeds to Wardsville as Middlesex CR 1.	New Glasgow, Rodney	Formerly the first incarnation of Highway 77 from August 5, 1936 to December 5, 1957. Formerly CR 3 until Highway 3 was turned back.	
104	MacPherson Road, McMillan Line, Blacks Road, Queens Line	MacPherson Road (Boundary with Chatham-Kent. Continues as C-K CR 19.)	CR 103 (Queen Street/Queens Line) in Rodney, Ontario	Rodney	Formerly CR 4. Re-numbered as CR 104 when Highway 4 was turned back.	
142	Wellington Street, Robinson Street	CR 19 (Robinson Street)	CR 50 (Victoria Street)	Port Burwell	Very short county road. Part of the former route of CR 42 (which continued along Lakeshore Line, connecting to Norfolk CR 42), before erosion forced parts of Lakeshore Line to close in 2002 and 2018.	
