= 2014 Elgin County municipal elections =

Local election in Ontario, Canada

Elections were held in Elgin County, Ontario on October 27, 2014 in conjunction with municipal elections across the province.

== Elgin County Council ==
Elgin County Council consists of the mayors of the constituent municipalities plus the deputy mayors of Central Elgin and Malahide.

Position	Elected
Aylmer Mayor	Greg Currie
Bayham Mayor	Paul L. Ens
Central Elgin Mayor	David Marr
Central Elgin Deputy Mayor	Tom Marks
Dutton/Dunwich Mayor	Cameron McWilliam
Malahide Mayor	Dave Mennill (acclaimed)
Malahide Deputy Mayor	Mike Wolfe
Southwold Mayor	Grant Jones
West Elgin Mayor	Bernie Wiehle

== Aylmer ==
Mayoral Candidate	Vote	%
Greg Currie	1,052	62.84
Jack Couckuyt (X)	405	24.19
Bob Habkirk	217	12.96

== Bayham ==
Mayoral Candidate	Vote	%
Paul L. Ens (X)	961	65.06
Roger James	516	34.94

== Central Elgin ==
Mayoral Candidate	Vote	%
David Marr	2,505	63.76
Bill Fehr	1,424	36.24

== Dutton/Dunwich ==
Mayoral Candidate	Vote	%
Cameron McWilliam (X)	813	74.52
Tim Dierickse	140	12.83
Dennis Zylstra	138	12.65

== Malahide ==
Mayoral Candidate	Vote	%
Dave Mennill (X)	Acclaimed	

== Southwold ==
Mayoral Candidate	Vote	%
Grant Jones	1,053	76.25
Hans Van Voorn	328	23.75

== West Elgin ==
Mayoral Candidate	Vote	%
Bernie Wiehle (X)	990	53.14
Dugald Aldred	873	46.86
