= Ontario Highway 3 =

Ontario provincial highway

Highway 3
- Talbot Trail
- A map of Highway 3 Highway 3 Sections downgraded in 1997 and 1998

Route information
- Maintained by Ministry of Transportation of Ontario
- Length: 258.2 km (160.4 mi) Excludes two gaps of 145.0 km (90.1 mi) and 3.4 km (2.1 mi)
- Existed: August 4, 1920–present

Section 1
- Length: 49.2 km (30.6 mi)
- West end: Ambassador Bridge to I-75 / I-96 in Detroit, Michigan
- Major intersections: E.C. Row Expressway in Windsor; Highway 401 – Windsor
- East end: Highway 77 near Leamington

Section 2
- Length: 187.9 km (116.8 mi)
- West end: Highway 4 near St. Thomas
- Major intersections: Highway 19 near Tillsonburg; Highway 24 in Norfolk; Highway 6 in Jarvis; Highbury Avenue in St Thomas; Belmont Road - (Former) Highway 74 near Aylmer; Imperial Road - (Former) Highway 73 in Aylmer; Norfolk Hwy 59 - (Former) Highway 59 in Delhi
- East end: Townline Road at Wainfleet–Port Colborne boundary

Section 3
- Length: 21.1 km (13.1 mi)
- West end: Highway 140 in Port Colborne
- East end: Rosehill Road in Fort Erie

Location
- Country: Canada
- Province: Ontario
- Major cities: Windsor, St. Thomas, Port Colborne
- Towns: Leamington, Tillsonburg, Simcoe, Dunnville, Fort Erie
- Villages: Delhi, Jarvis, Cayuga, Aylmer

Highway system
- Ontario provincial highways; Current; Former; 400-series
← Highway 2	→ Highway 4
Former provincial highways
← Highway 2S	Highway 3B →

King's Highway 3, commonly referred to as Highway 3, is a provincially maintained highway in the Canadian province of Ontario which travels parallel to the northern shoreline of Lake Erie. It has three segments, the first of which travels from the Ambassador Bridge in Windsor to Highway 77 in Leamington. The second portion begins at Talbotville Royal outside of St. Thomas at Highway 4, and travels to the western city limits of Port Colborne. The road is regionally maintained within Port Colborne as Niagara Regional Road 3, but regains its provincial designation at Highway 140. Its third and final terminus is at Edgewood Park, within the Fort Erie town limits. From there, the road continues as Niagara Regional Road 3 to the Peace Bridge, where drivers can cross to the United States. The total length of Highway 3 is 248.9 or 258.2 km (154.7 or 160.4 mi), consisting of 49.2 km (30.6 mi) from Windsor to Leamington, 187.9 km (116.8 mi) from Talbotville Royal to Port Colborne and 21.1 km (13.1 mi) from Port Colborne to Edgewood Park.

Until the late 1990s, Highway 3 formed a single continuous 413.2 km (256.8 mi) route from the Ambassador Bridge to near the Peace Bridge, but since then has had significant portion transferred to regional and county governments. A large segment of the route follows the historic Talbot Trail, a settlement road following the northern shore of Lake Erie constructed by Colonel Talbot in the early 1800s as part of a grand settlement plan along the lake front. East of Canborough, the road generally follows older settlement trails: Forks Road, connecting Dunnville with Wainfleet, portions of Sherk's Road, through Port Colborne to Gasline, and the Garrison Road, a military road built west from Fort Erie. The highway was initially designated in 1920, but not numbered until five years later. It originally connected to Niagara Falls, but was rerouted to Fort Erie following completion of the Peace Bridge in the late 1920s. Although a few portions of Highway 3 were upgraded in the years since, the highway generally follows the same route as it did in 1930. However, in 1997, segments through Port Colborne and Fort Erie were decommissioned as a provincial highway, followed by a segment of the route from Leamington to Talbotville Royal in 1998. All three now exist as county/regional roads. In Windsor, Highway 401 had terminated at a split interchange with Highway 3 where the freeway defaulted into Talbot Road, from 2011 to 2015 this segment of Highway 3 (Talbot Road and Huron Church Road) was realigned to accommodate the construction of the Highway 401 extension (also known as the Rt. Hon. Herb Gray Parkway, formerly Windsor-Essex Parkway).

== Route description ==
Highway 3 follows the route of the historic Talbot Trail for most of its length. Abutting the northern shore of Lake Erie between Windsor and Fort Erie, the route deviates in places to bypass towns and to avoid the less than direct trail laid nearly two centuries ago. Prior to 1998, the highway spanned this entire distance, but has since then been divided into three discontinuous sections. The western section travels 50.2 km (31.2 mi) from Windsor to Leamington. From there, a 145.0 km (90.1 mi) gap separates the western and central sections. Highway 3 resumes near St. Thomas at the southern end of Highway 4 and travels 187.9 km (116.8 mi) east to Port Colborne. The central and eastern sections are divided by a 3.4 km (2.1 mi) Connecting Link through Port Colborne. The eastern section begins at Highway 140 and travels 21.1 km (13.1 mi) to Fort Erie. It ends at Rosehill Road, a short distance west of the Peace Bridge crossing into New York.

=== Western segment ===
The western segment of Highway 3 begins at the Ambassador Bridge, which connects Canada with the U.S. state of Michigan over the Detroit River. The five lane highway travels southeast through Windsor along Huron Church Road, surrounded by residential subdivisions, then curves east along Talbot Road. The section through Windsor to Cabana Road is maintained under a Connecting Link agreement. Between the E. C. Row Expressway and Howard Ave, Highway 3 runs adjacent to the Rt. Hon. Herb Gray Parkway portion of Highway 401. At Essex County Road 11, Highway 3 enters rural southwestern Ontario, and is dominated by farmland for much of its length through Essex County. The now four-laned route becomes divided as it follows the Essex Bypass around the southern edge of Essex, with commercial services lining the highway, primarily on the north side. Returning to farmland and narrowing to a two lane undivided road, the highway continues southeast, passing nearby, but avoiding, several small communities that the original highway travelled through. After passing Essex County Road 18, the route curves eastward, passing north of Kingsville before entering Leamington along its northern fringe. The western section ends at the southern terminus of Highway 77, where the provincially built but county maintained Leamington Bypass continues east to meet the Talbot Road just east of the town.

=== Central segment ===
The five-span bridge in Cayuga in 2010; opened in 1924, demolished in 2014 and replaced by a concrete structure

The central segment is the longest of the three, at 187.9 km (116.8 mi). It begins at the southern terminus of Highway 4 at Talbotville Royal in Elgin County, just northwest of St. Thomas and south of London. The route travels east into St. Thomas, becoming a two-laned expressway aptly named the St. Thomas Expressway. This expressway begins at Wellington Road (Elgin County Road 25/26) and travels through St. Thomas to Centennial Road, featuring a single interchange. However, the right-of-way is wide enough to accommodate any future upgrade to a divided expressway. At the eastern end, Highway 3 turns south onto Centennial Road and then east onto Talbot Line, following the historic Talbot Trail to east of Aylmer. This mostly straight and rural portion passes through several small villages before the Talbot Trail splits from it to follow Elgin/Norfolk County Road 38 through Straffordville. Highway 3 meanwhile curves northeast and passes through Tillsonburg, encountering Highway 19. It then curves east and travels parallel to the St. Thomas and Eastern Railway to Courtland, remerging with the Talbot Trail and snaking towards Delhi, now within Norfolk County.

At Delhi, Highway 3 turns south for 4 km (2.5 mi) before returning to its eastward orientation. It continues through farmland to the town of Simcoe, where it meets Highway 24. From Simcoe to Canborough, the highway is nearly straight as an arrow, with an occasional jog to the northeast. It enters Haldimand County and intersects Highway 6 in Jarvis. At Cayuga it crosses the Grand River; until 2014, a five-span steel girder bridge crossed the river, but it has since been replaced by a concrete structure. At Canborough, the historic Talbot Trail ends and Highway 3 veers south to Dunnville, briefly travelling along the northern bank of the Grand River and gradually curving back eastward. East of Dunnville, the route follows Forks Road into Wainfleet and the Niagara Region. At Chambers Corners it turns south and passes through Wainfleet village, crossing the old Feeder Canal which once supplied the Welland Canal with water from the Grand River. Just north of Lake Erie, Highway 3 turns east and travels straight towards Port Colborne, passing just south of the Wainfleet Bog. At Townline Road, the boundary between Wainfleet and Port Colborne, the central section ends and the roadway continues as Niagara Regional Road 3 through the city, meeting the southern end of Highway 58.

Highway 3 at Highway 140 in Port Colborne

Portions of the central segment of Highway 3 through several towns are maintained under Connecting Link agreements, including within Aylmer, Delhi, Simcoe, Cayuga and Dunnville. The combined length of these segments is 15.9 kilometres (9.9 mi).

=== Eastern segment ===
The final and shortest section of Highway 3 begins at Highway 140 on the eastern fringe of Port Colborne and lies entirely within Niagara Region. The 21.1 km (13.1 mi) segment travels several kilometres inland to Lake Erie, as well as parallel to it. From there it mostly travels along a straight line eastward through generally rural areas. The notable exception is the village of Gasline, where the Niagara Speedway stands on the northern side of the highway. At the Fort Erie boundary, the route widens to four lanes and jogs northeast to align with the old Garrison Road. As the highway progresses eastward into the town, the surroundings gradually become more urbanized before it ends at Rosehill Road. The roadway continues east through Fort Erie to the foot of the Peace Bridge as Niagara Regional Road 3, connecting with the Queen Elizabeth Way to provide access to the United States.

=== Connections with the United States ===
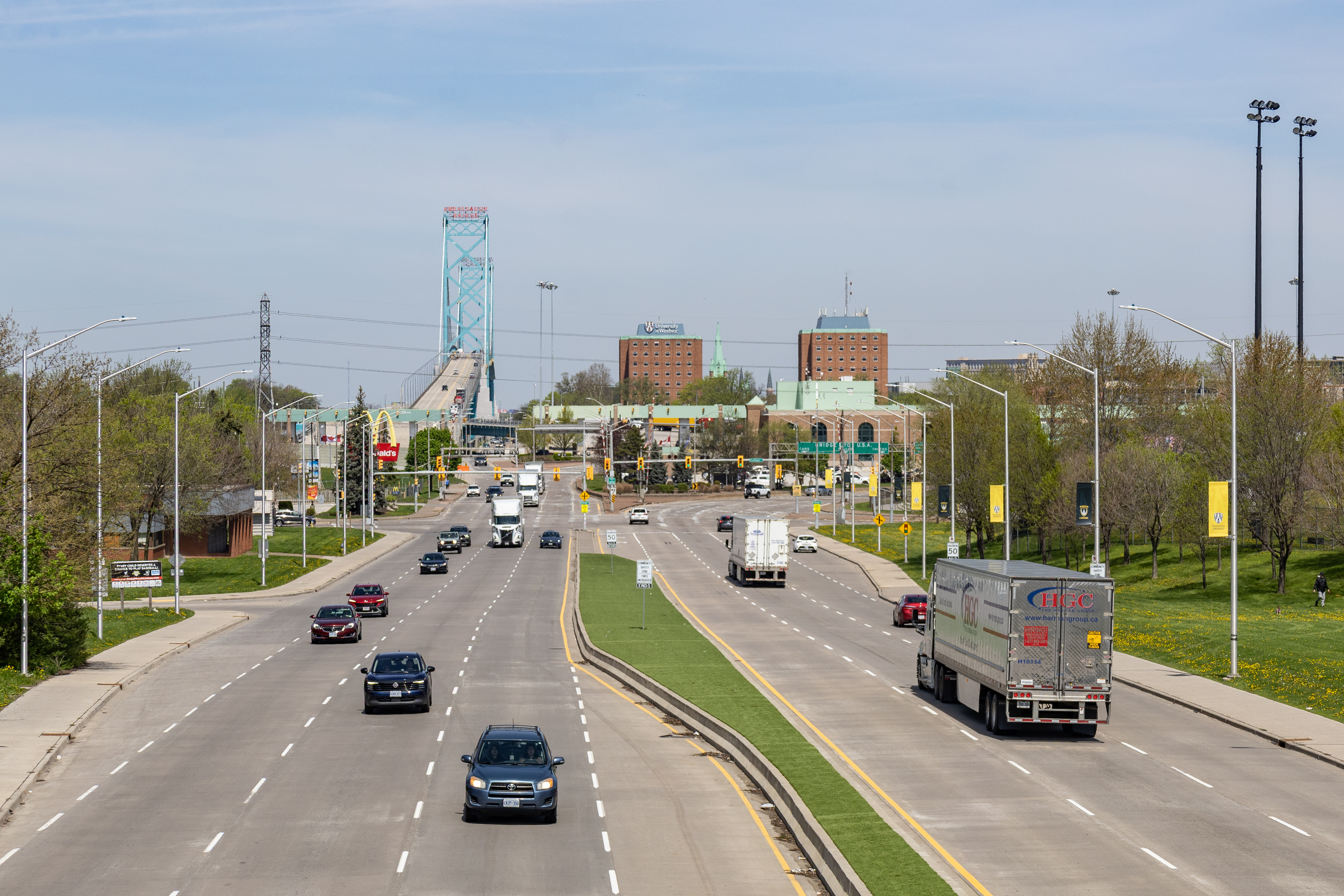
Southbound traffic to the Canada-USA border crossing in Windsor follows Highway 3 which has over a dozen traffic lights en route to the Ambassador Bridge. This congested route will be bypassed by an extension of Highway 401 leading to a new international bridge.

Highway 3 was the only Ontario provincial highway to both start and end at international crossings with the United States (the Ambassador Bridge leading into Detroit, Michigan and the Peace Bridge leading into Buffalo, New York, respectively). From Chicago, Toledo, and Detroit to Buffalo and Western New York, Highway 3 was shorter and more direct than any American route (including Interstate 90), because the Lake Erie shoreline dips south along Ohio, Pennsylvania, and New York. After the 1954 New York State Thruway opened from Buffalo to New York City, Michigan officials had encouraged Ontario to replace Highway 3 with a toll road connecting Detroit to Buffalo.

When the Michigan Department of Transportation discontinued US 25 in 1973, much of it through Detroit was redesignated as M-3, whose southern terminus came at Clark Street in Detroit, at the junction of I-75 by the Ambassador Bridge. This provided a connection between Michigan's M-3 and Ontario's Highway 3 until 2001, when jurisdictional changes within downtown Detroit created a discontinuous segment of M-3, and this international Route 3 connection was lost when the portion of M-3 along Fort Street was redesignated M-85.

Highway 3 has been largely replaced as a Detroit–Buffalo truck route by portions of Highway 401, Highway 403 and the Queen Elizabeth Way. Although Highway 3 is a shorter distance between Detroit and Buffalo than the aforementioned 400-series highways, plus Highway 3 does not have to climb the Niagara Escarpment unlike parallel portions of Highway 403 (the Chedoke Expressway section) and the QEW, there has been traffic preference for these higher-speed 400-series highways which are also routed through major cities (London, Hamilton, St. Catharines) and which have in turn received more upgrades and extensions. During this time the only upgrades to Highway 3 were the Essex Bypass and St. Thomas Expressway, as the rest of the route remained a two-lane road passing through small communities. The last section of Highway 403 between Brantford and Ancaster opened in August 1997, making for a continuous express route between Windsor and Fort Erie, replacing Highway 2 which had been the previous link from Highway 401 to the Ancaster-Hamilton segment of Highway 403. This left a local section of Highway 3 on Windsor surface streets as a bottleneck, however this will be bypassed by the Highway 401 extension (Windsor–Essex Parkway) to the Gordie Howe International Bridge to Detroit in 2025.

== History ==
=== Talbot Trail ===
The history of Highway 3 dates back over 200 years to the pioneering settlement era of Upper Canada following the American Revolution and the resulting influx of United Empire Loyalists. Thomas Talbot, an influential scion who joined the British army at the age of 11, would challenge the government, the terrain, and the forces of nature to see to it that his road be built. Due to his family legacy, Talbot worked through the ranks quickly and found himself a personal aide to John Graves Simcoe, the first Lieutenant Governor of Upper Canada. He returned to England after Simcoe fell ill, but vowed to return to the hinterland he had come to love.

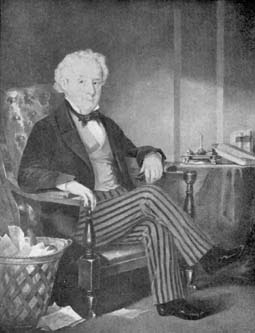
Colonel Thomas Talbot

After completing his military commission, Talbot returned to Upper Canada in 1801 at the age of 30. Although Simcoe had promised Talbot 5,000 acres (20,000,000 m^{2}) of land in Yarmouth Township on the shoreline of Lake Erie, he had not made it official. Talbot returned to England in 1802 and spoke to the legislature, promoting his concept of a vibrant farming settlement. The government granted Talbot his land and promised an additional 200 acres (81 ha) for each family that settled a 50 acres (20 ha) lot in the original grant. Talbot returned to Upper Canada in 1803 with four families and a letter from Lord Hobart authorizing his grant, and established what is now the town of Port Stanley. Wishing to expand his grant and create his ideal colony, Talbot sought out new settlers; a road was required.

Talbot received a grant of $250 in September 1804 for the construction of a road between Brantford and Delhi. John Bostwick would survey the route that year; however, funding shortages would halt construction in 1806. Talbot approached the new Lieutenant Governor – Francis Gore – in 1808 with the intent of persuading him to fund the building of the road. He insisted that a road would increase the value of the land in the surrounding townships, as well as providing a greater incentive for newcomers to settle in what was otherwise a desolate wilderness. Gore instructed deputy surveyor Mahlon Burwell to "Build a road one chain wide, laid out on the principle of Yonge Street with lots on each side." Burwell began this work in 1809 westward from Delhi. In 1811, he was tasked with surveying the West Talbot Road from Talbotville Royale to Amherstburg. By then, a road was already opened between Port Talbot and Talbotville Royale.

Construction of the new road proved far more difficult than first imagined. Workers followed an old Native American trail, wholly consumed by nature, between Delhi and Port Talbot. To get across the numerous swamps, felled trees were laid across the path to create a corduroy road, much to the chagrin of settlers. The outbreak of the War of 1812 would temporarily halt further construction. When it resumed in 1816, Talbot himself began directing the surveyor, ordering that the road remain on the highest ground possible. This led to an irregular and winding route between Aylmer and Delhi. By 1830, the corduroy logs had been removed and the road improved and extended from Amherstburg to Canborough.

=== Niagara trails ===
East of Canborough, Highway 3 follows several early settlement trails: Forks Road between Dunnville and Chambers Corners, Sherk's Road through Port Colborne to Gasline, and the military Garrison Road through Fort Erie. These roads predate the land survey grid of concession roads and sidelines, which would be used by the provincial government to make Highway 3 a continuous route through the Niagara Peninsula where none previously existed.

Forks Road, a river road following Forks Creek, served to connect the Grand River at Dunnville with the Welland River west of Welland. Like many early roads in Upper Canada, it was built along a river bank. It can therefore be assumed that this trail was built prior to the completion of the Feeder Canal in 1832. Sherk's Road was built at the request of Elias Sherk (d. 1893) in 1858 to connect his house (the historic Danner House) with his and Michael Gondor's properties. The irregular road connected the Welland Canal at Humberstone (now Port Colborne) to the community of Ridgeway, where it met the west end of the Garrison Road. That road was built due to the threat of American attack to provide quick access from Fort Erie, and, like other military roads in Upper Canada (e.g. Dundas Street or Yonge Street), it travelled in a straight line, in this case parallel to the Lake Erie shoreline.

=== Provincial Highway Network ===
Until 1918, the majority of the primary roads through southern Ontario formed part of the County Road System. The Department of Public Works and Highways paid up to 60% of the construction and maintenance costs for these roads, while the counties were responsible for the remaining 40%. In 1919, the federal government passed the Canada Highways Act, which provided $20,000,000 to provinces under the condition that they establish an official highway network; up to 40% of construction costs would be subsidized. The first network plan was approved on February 26, 1920, and included the Talbot Road. The majority of what would soon become Highway 3 was designated several months later in August. However, it would not receive a route number until the summer of 1925.

Four significant changes to Highway 3 have taken place since the designation of the route in 1920. The first was an adjustment to the eastern terminus. The second was the Essex Bypass, built through the 1970s between Windsor and Leamington. The third was the St. Thomas Expressway, a super two highway built in the late 1970s. The final change was the provincial highway transfers conducted in 1997 and 1998 that resulted in three segments of Highway 3 being decommissioned: between Leamington and Talbotville Royale, through Port Colborne and within Fort Erie.

Highway 3 originally ended at the Honeymoon Bridge in Niagara Falls; it continued east of Chambers Corners along Forks Road (Regional Road 23) rather than south through Wainfleet as it does today. It then travelled north through Welland and east along Lundys Lane. Highway 58 and Highway 20 would later follow portions of this route. As part of the "spirit of cooperation" that inundated Canada and the US following World War I, as well as to celebrate a century of peace, a new bridge was planned between Fort Erie and Buffalo alongside the international railway crossing. Construction began in 1925; the completed bridge opened to traffic on June 1, 1927. Two months later, on August 7, the bridge was formally dedicated as the Peace Bridge by US Vice President Charles Dawes, and Edward, Prince of Wales.

Traffic patterns quickly shifted to take advantage of the new crossing and the bypass of Niagara Falls that it provided. In foresight of this, the Department of Public Highways took control of a Welland County road between Chambers Corners and Fort Erie on May 11, 1927. This roadway, which followed a significant portion of Sherk's Road and the Garrison Road, in addition to a concession road built west from Port Colborne and north through Wainfleet village, was designated as Highway 3A. The following year it was surfaced with concrete and a new bridge built over the Welland Canal in Port Colborne. The new route became so popular that in 1929 the Highway 3 and Highway 3A designations were swapped.

In the early 1970s, as part of a review to determine the future route of Highway 406 south of Welland, proposals arose for a bypass of Highway 3 from east of Dunnville to Port Colborne near Highway 58.

=== Essex Bypass ===
The Essex Bypass was opened in stages in the 1970s and early 1980s. Plans were completed in 1968 as part of a province-wide program to bypass small towns on busy provincial highways. The first stage, opened by 1972, began west of Maidstone and passed south of Essex, where it then routed along Malden Road to its former alignment (now Essex County Road 34). Construction of an eastward extension to Ruthven was underway by 1982, and completed in 1983, with the road following Union Road to the old alignment. Construction of a final extension, from Union Road north of Ruthven to past Highway 77 on the northern fringe of Leamington, was underway in late 1998; it opened in early December 1999. Although the Leamington Bypass was constructed by the Ministry of Transportation (MTO), the 1.1-kilometre (0.68 mi) segment east of Highway 77 to County Road 34 (Talbot Road) was never a part of Highway 3 or the provincial highway network. It is signed as Essex County Road 33, as Leamington is planning to link the discontinuous segments of County Road 33 with the East Side Arterial Road.

The Essex Bypass, completed around the village of Essex in 1972, was designed to accommodate future widening to a divided four lane road when traffic volumes warranted. By the mid-1990s, a regular pattern of fatalities were occurring, prompting local politicians and Essex Member of Provincial Parliament (MPP) Bruce Crozier to lobby the MTO widen the route. It was announced in June 2006 that the entire 33 kilometres (21 mi) bypass would be twinned with an additional carriageway, with a grassy median separating the opposing flows of traffic. The three phase project began in September 2007 with a 6.4 kilometres (4.0 mi) stretch between Maidstone and County Road 8 west of Essex. The four-laned highway opened in June 2009 at a cost of C$20.7 million. The C$22.1 million second phase involved widening the highway between Walker Road and Maidstone to a five lane cross-section, and began in mid-November 2009. It was completed in early 2012. Despite concerns raised by Crozier in 2006 that the project would be halted after the first phase, which were dismissed at the time, no further work has actually been completed on the Essex Bypass since 2012, and the section between Essex and Ruthven remains a two lane highway. It is still considered as a future project by the MTO, with no time line set. Three months after Crozier's unexpected death on June 3, 2011, the entire Essex Bypass was renamed the Bruce Crozier Way in honour of his commitment to the widening of the highway.

On August 12, 2019, the MTO announced its intention to expand Highway 3 within Essex County by twinning the existing two-lane highway with a second carriageway. Early construction work was underway as of March 2021 to twin approximately 6 km (3.7 mi) of Highway 3 around the town of Essex, including intersection improvements at Essex County Road 8 (Maidstone Avenue), removal of the at-grade intersection at Ellis Side Road (access to southbound carriageway removed, northbound carriageway access changed to right-in/right-out), and a grade-separation at North Malden Road/Victoria Avenue which involved replacing the signalized intersection with an underpass. Further expansion from east of Essex to Leamington is currently under detailed design and engineering. On June 2, 2023, construction started to twin 15.6 kilometres (15.6 km) of the Essex Bypass, from 1.2 kilometres (0.75 mi) east of Essex Road 23 (Arner Townline) easterly to 1.1 kilometres (0.68 mi) east of Essex Road 34 (Union Avenue).

=== St. Thomas Expressway ===
The lone interchange on the St. Thomas Expressway; note the unused right span of the overpass, designed to accommodate future expansion

The St. Thomas expressway was built along the northern edge of that city beginning in 1974. It features six overpasses and a single interchange, at First Avenue. A ribbon cutting ceremony was held on September 7, 1981 to officially open the new route, which bypassed the former Highway 3 alignment along Talbot Street and the short concurrency with Highway 4 (Sunset Drive). The bypass cost C$16.5 million to construct, and features a two-lane roadway with allotted space on the north side for a second two-lane roadway. Plans originally called for the expressway to extend further east to New Sarum and later even as far as Aylmer, but these have never materialized.

=== Downloads to municipalities ===
Highway 3 ended near the Peace Bridge from 1929 until 1998

Aside from the Essex Bypass and St. Thomas Expressway, Highway 3 remained generally unchanged between the 1930s and late 1990s. However, budget constraints brought on by a recession in the 1990s resulted in the Mike Harris provincial government forming the Who Does What? committee to determine cost-cutting measures in order to balance the budget after a deficit incurred by former premier Bob Rae. It was determined that many Ontario highways no longer served long-distance traffic movement and should therefore be maintained by local or regional levels of government. The MTO consequently transferred many highways to lower levels of government in 1997 and 1998, removing a significant percentage of the provincial highway network.

Highway 3 served as one of the principal highways through southwestern Ontario, since this Detroit–Buffalo route is more direct with a shorter distance than using the below-mentioned 400-series highways, and furthermore Highway 3 does not have to climb the Niagara Escarpment unlike parallel portions of Highway 403 (the Chedoke Expressway section) and the QEW. Nonetheless, due to traffic preference for higher-speed freeways which have in turn received more upgrades and extensions, Highway 3 had been largely supplanted by the combination of Highway 401 (segments which have been widened since the 1990s), Highway 403 (particularly the completion of the Woodstock-Brantford-Ancaster sections in 1997 which makes for a continuous express link), and the QEW as a through-route. As a result, portions of Highway 3 through the Regional Municipality of Niagara were transferred to the region on April 1, 1997, including a 3.4-kilometre (2.1 mi) segment through Port Colborne (most of which had existed as a Connecting Link) and a 5.6-kilometre (3.5 mi) segment in Fort Erie. To the west, a segment of the route paralleling Highway 401 between Leamington and Talbotville Royal was decommissioned on January 1, 1998 and transferred to Essex County, Chatham–Kent and Elgin County. It has since been designated as Essex County Road 34, Chatham–Kent Road 3 and Elgin County Road 3.

In 2001, the MTO considered renumbering the western segment of Highway 3 as Highway 103 to avoid confusion. However, this never came to pass due to opposition from Windsor city councillors.

=== Windsor–Essex Parkway ===
Highway 401 did not originally have direct access to the Canada–United States border, as upon entering the Windsor city limits the route terminated at a split interchange with Highway 3 where the freeway defaulted onto Talbot Road. Traffic continuing to the border had to follow the non-express Highway 3 routing along Talbot Road and Huron Church Road which had a dozen traffic lights. The approach to the Ambassador Bridge was heavily built up making it impractical to twin this crossing and reconstruct the approach as a freeway to cope with cross-border traffic growth, even though Ambassador Bridge owner Matty Moroun had long lobbied for this solution, making this the focus of controversy since the mid-1990s and early 2000s. Numerous attempts by local and provincial politicians since then have led the MTO to begin remedying the situation by constructing an extension of Highway 401 (initially known as the Windsor–Essex Parkway, eventually designated as the Rt. Hon. Herb Gray Parkway) to a new international crossing.

In 2004, a joint announcement by the federal government of the United States and Government of Canada confirmed that a new border crossing would be constructed between Detroit and Windsor. The Detroit River International Crossing (DRIC) was formed as a bi-national committee to manage the project. The MTO took advantage of this opportunity to extend Highway 401 to the international border and began an environmental assessment on the entire project in late 2005.

Initial construction of a noise barrier from North Talbot Road to Howard Avenue began in March 2010. Full construction began on August 19, 2011, with an expected completion date of mid-2015 for the first phase and 2015-16 for the remainder of the parkway. In early 2015, it was announced that the parkway would open to traffic between Highway 3 and Labelle Street (near the E.C. Row Expressway) in the spring. The existing segment of Highway 3 (Talbot Road and Huron Church Road) from the E. C. Row Expressway to just east of Outer Drive was realigned to free up right-of-way for the Highway 401 extension which was built below-grade in a trench with tunnels to cross underneath surface streets (including those carrying the Highway 3 routing). The old split interchange between Highway 3 (Talbot Road) and Highway 401 was replaced by an all-direction junction incorporating a roundabout, from which a new alignment of Talbot Road bypassed the intersection with Outer Drive (which had traffic lights added in 2006) just each of the former split. The Highway 401 extension runs parallel to (but does not replace) Highway 3 until the E. C. Row Expressway. After an interchange to Highway 3 and Labelle Street, the Highway 401 extension then changed direction where it runs parallel westward for 2 km (1.2 mi), then it turned northwest and follow a new alignment to the under-construction Gordie Howe International Bridge (formerly the Detroit River International Crossing and the New International Trade Crossing) border crossing.

=== Cayuga bridge replacement ===
Work was done in Cayuga to install a new crossing over the Grand River, replacing the five-span steel structure that previously served traffic since 1924. The new concrete structure was opened to traffic on June 20, 2014, and the former structure was demolished after that. On November 4 and December 4 of that year, construction on the bridge was halted by the Haudenosaunee Confederacy Chiefs Council on the claim that the structure impeded on land reserved for a towpath along the Grand River by the Six Nations of the Grand River First Nation. The remaining work included a scheduled three-day closure during which the new bridge was jacked 5 metres (16 ft) north to align with the former structure, as well as decorative work. Work was completed in the autumn of 2015.

== Major intersections ==
The following table lists the major junctions along Highway 3, as noted by the Ministry of Transportation of Ontario.

Division	Location	km	mi	Destinations	Notes
Detroit River; Canada–United States border		0.0	0.0	To I-75 / I-96 – Detroit	Continuation into Michigan; beginning of Windsor Connecting Link agreement
Detroit River; Canada–United States border		0.0	0.0	Ambassador Bridge (toll)	
Windsor		0.0	0.0	Detroit–Windsor Ambassador Bridge Border Crossing	
Windsor		4.0	2.5	Industrial Road (east); Northwood Street (west)	End of Windsor Connecting Link agreement
Windsor		4.5	2.8	E.C. Row Expressway	Beginning of travelling alongside Herb Gray Parkway (Highway 401); formerly Highway 2 / Highway 18
Windsor		4.6	2.9	Highway 401 east – London	Eastbound exit and westbound entrance; Highway 401 exit 5
Windsor–Essex boundary	Windsor–La Salle boundary	6.7	4.2	County Road 6 (Todd Lane (west) / Cabana Road West (east))	
Windsor–Essex boundary	Windsor–La Salle boundary	6.7	4.2	Highway 401 west – Bridge to United States	Westbound exit
Windsor–Essex boundary	Windsor–La Salle boundary	7.2	4.5	County Road 7 (Huron Church Line Road)	
Windsor–Essex boundary	Windsor–La Salle boundary	7.3	4.5	Highway 401 east – London	Eastbound exit and westbound entrance; Highway 401 exit 7
Windsor–Essex boundary	Windsor–La Salle boundary	9.8	6.1	Highway 401 east – London	Eastbound exit
Windsor–Essex boundary	Windsor–La Salle boundary	9.8	6.1	Highway 401 west – Bridge to United States	Westbound exit
Windsor–Essex boundary	Windsor–La Salle boundary	10.4	6.5	County Road 9 north (Howard Avenue)	
Essex	Tecumseh	11.1	6.9	Highway 401 – London, Toronto, Bridge to United States; County Road 9 south (Highway 7908) – Amherstburg	End of travelling alongside Herb Gray Parkway (Highway 401); no access to Highway 401 west from Highway 3 east; Highway 401 exit 5
Essex	Tecumseh	12.7	7.9	County Road 11 (Walker Road)	
Essex	Tecumseh	17.9	11.1	County Road 34 (Talbot Road)	
Essex	Lakeshore	22.4	13.9	County Road 19 (Manning Road)	
Essex	Essex	25.4	15.8	County Road 8 (Maidstone Avenue)	
Essex	Essex	27.4	17.0	County Road 23 (Arner Townline Road)	
Essex	Kingsville	33.6	20.9	County Road 27 (Cottam Sideroad)	
Essex	Kingsville	36.6	22.7	County Road 29 (Division Road)	
Essex	Kingsville	39.9	24.8	County Road 18	
Essex	Kingsville	43.2	26.8	County Road 34 (Talbot Road) – Ruthven	
Essex	Kingsville–Leamington boundary	45.7	28.4	County Road 31 (Albuna Townline Road)	
Essex	Leamington	49.2	30.6	Highway 77 north to Highway 401 / Erie Street Highway 3 ends Essex County Road 33 begins	End of Highway 3 western segment; continues as County Road 33; to former Highway 18 west
Essex	Leamington	51.4	31.9	County Road 34 (Talbot Street) County Road 33 south (Leamington Bypass)	Former Highway 3 follows Essex County Road 34 east
Essex–Chatham-Kent boundary	Wheatley	61.8	38.4	Essex County Road 34 ends Chatham-Kent Municipal Road 3 begins	
Chatham-Kent	Blenheim	110.5	68.7	Municipal Road 8 west (Marlborough Street) Municipal Road 19 east (Talbot Street)	Formerly Highway 98 west
Chatham-Kent	Blenheim	111.1	69.0	Municipal Road 11 north (Chatham Street)	Formerly Highway 40 north
Chatham-Kent	Eatonville	122.2	75.9	Municipal Road 15 (Kent Bridge Road)	Formerly Highway 51 south
Chatham-Kent	Morpeth	126.8	78.8	Municipal Road 17 (Hill Road)	Formerly Highway 21 north
Chatham-Kent–Elgin boundary	West Elgin	143.5	89.2	MacPherson Line Chatham-Kent Municipal Road 3 ends Elgin County Road 3 begins	
Elgin	West Elgin	157.0	97.6	County Road 76 north (Graham Road)	Eagle; formerly Highway 76 north
Elgin	Southwold	194.2	120.7	Elgin County Road 3 ends Highway 3 begins Highway 4 north to Highway 401 – London; County Road 4 south (Sunset Road) – St. Thomas, Port Stanley	Talbotville; beginning of Highway 3 central segment; Highway 4 southern terminus
Elgin	Southwold	196.3	122.0	County Road 52 east (Ron McNeil Line)	
Elgin	Southwold–Central Elgin boundary	197.9	123.0	County Road 25 (Wellington Road)	Beginning of St. Thomas Expressway
St. Thomas		201.5	125.2	First Avenue	Interchange
St. Thomas		203.8	126.6	Centennial Road	End of St. Thomas Expressway; Highway 3 follows Centennial Road
St. Thomas		205.0	127.4	Talbot Street County Road 28 south (Centennial Road)	Highway 3 follows Talbot Street
Elgin	Central Elgin	209.1	129.9	County Road 36 south (Quaker Road)	
Elgin	Central Elgin	210.1	130.6	County Road 74 north (Belmont Road)	New Sarum; formerly Highway 74 north
Elgin	Central Elgin–Malahide boundary	213.2	132.5	County Road 35 (Springwater Road)	
Elgin	Aylmer	216.2	134.3		Beginning of Aylmer Connecting Link agreement
Elgin	Aylmer	216.8	134.7	County Road 53 north (Elm Street)	
Elgin	Aylmer	217.4	135.1	County Road 73 (John Street)	Formerly Highway 73
Elgin	Aylmer	218.5	135.8		End of Aylmer Connecting Link agreement
Elgin	Malahide	221.8	137.8	County Road 40 (Springfield Road)	Summers Corners
Elgin	Malahide	227.3	141.2	County Road 38 east (Heritage Line)	
Elgin	Bayham	231.1	143.6	County Road 46 (Culloden Road)	
Elgin	Bayham	233.6	145.2	County Road 44 (Eden Road)	
Oxford	Tillsonburg	243.2	151.1	Highway 19 north (Vienna Street) – Ingersoll; County Highway 19 south – Port Burwell	
Norfolk		246.0	152.9	County Road 51 west (Simcoe Street)	
Norfolk	Courtland	249.8	155.2	County Road 13 north / County Highway 59 south (Rock Mills Road)	Formerly Highway 59 south; former western end of Highway 59 concurrency
Norfolk	Courtland	251.0	156.0	County Road 38 south (Talbot Street)	
Norfolk		256.8	159.6	County Road 16 south (Rhineland Road)	
Norfolk	Delhi	261.1	162.2	County Highway 59 north Big Creek Drive south	Formerly Highway 59 north; former eastern end of Highway 59 concurrency
Norfolk	Delhi	261.7	162.6	Talbot Road	Beginning of Delhi Connecting Link agreement
Norfolk	Delhi	262.3	163.0	County Road 37 north (James Street)	
Norfolk	Delhi	262.4	163.0	County Road 4 east (Church Street)	
Norfolk	Delhi	263.8	163.9	Wilson Avenue	End of Delhi Connecting Link agreement
Norfolk	Gilbertville	265.6	165.0	County Road 46 south (Pinegrove Road)	
Norfolk	Atherton	265.6	165.0	County Road 21 west (Lynedoch Road)	
Norfolk		266.6	165.7	County Road 10 south (Turkey Point Road)	
Norfolk		272.8	169.5	County Road 25 north (Nixon Road) – Nixon	
Norfolk		277.0	172.1	County Road 41 south (Hillcrest Road)	
Norfolk	Simcoe	277.8	172.6		Beginning of Simcoe Connecting Link agreement
Norfolk	Simcoe	278.3	172.9	County Road 40 north (Park Road)	
Norfolk	Simcoe	279.0	173.4	County Road 35 north (Hunt Street)	
Norfolk	Simcoe	280.0	174.0	Highway 24 north / County Highway 24 south (Norfolk Street) – Brantford	
Norfolk	Simcoe	281.8	175.1	Ireland Road	End of Simcoe Connecting Link agreement
Norfolk	Renton	287.4	178.6	County Road 5 (Cockshutt Road)	
Haldimand		293.8	182.6	County Road 74 north (Keith Richardson Parkway) – Townsend	
Haldimand		311.4	193.5	County Road 70 south	
Haldimand	Jarvis	296.3	184.1		Beginning of Jarvis Connecting Link agreement
Haldimand	Jarvis	296.8	184.4	Highway 6 – Hamilton, Port Dover	
Haldimand	Jarvis	298.1	185.2		End of Jarvis Connecting Link agreement
Haldimand		298.5	185.5	County Road 55	
Haldimand		302.2	187.8	County Road 18 (Sandusk Road)	
Haldimand	Balmoral	309.9	192.6	County Road 53	
Haldimand	Nelles Corners	311.4	193.5	County Road 20	
Haldimand		317.4	197.2	County Road 8 south (Kohler Road)	
Haldimand	Cayuga	319.4	198.5	Grand River bridge	
Haldimand	Cayuga	319.5	198.5	Ouse Street	Beginning of Cayuga Connecting Link agreement
Haldimand	Cayuga	319.9	198.8	County Highway 54 north	Formerly Highway 54 north
Haldimand	Cayuga	320.1	198.9	County Road 17 east (Thorburn Street)	
Haldimand	Cayuga	320.8	199.3	Monture Street	End of Cayuga Connecting Link agreement
Haldimand		327.3	203.4	County Highway 56 north County Road 32 south	Formerly Highway 56 north
Haldimand	Canborough	334.9	208.1	County Road 14 east (Smithville Road)	To County Road 2 / County Road 63
Haldimand	Dunnville	344.5	214.1	County Road 17 west	
Haldimand	Dunnville	345.8	214.9	County Road 15 (Robinson Road)	Beginning of Dunnville Connecting Link agreement
Haldimand	Dunnville	349.2	217.0	County Road 61 (Taylor Road); Ramsey Drive	To County Road 3
Haldimand	Dunnville	350.5	217.8	Inman Road	End of Dunnville Connecting Link agreement
Haldimand		353.1	219.4	County Road 7 north (Marshagen Road)	
Haldimand	Mount Carmel	356.9	221.8	County Road 65 south (Hutchinson Road)	
Niagara	Wainfleet	359.6	223.4	Regional Road 4 north (Wellandport Road)	
Niagara	Wainfleet	368.7	229.1	Regional Road 24 north (Victoria Avenue) Regional Road 23 east (Forks Road)	Chambers Corners
Niagara	Wainfleet	375.1	233.1	Regional Road 3 west (Concession 1)	Ostryhon Corners; Niagara Regional Road 3 (western segment)
Niagara	Wainfleet	377.5	234.6	Golf Course Road	Formerly Regional Road 30
Niagara	Wainfleet–Port Colborne boundary	382.1	237.4	Townline Road Highway 3 ends Niagara Regional Road 3 begins	End of Highway 3 eastern segment; continues as Regional Road 3 (central segment)
Niagara	Port Colborne	382.6	237.7	Regional Road 5 east (Killaly Street)	
Niagara	Port Colborne	383.6	238.4	Highway 58 north (West Side Road)	
Niagara	Port Colborne	385.5	239.5	Niagara Regional Road 3 ends Highway 3 begins Highway 140 north – Welland	Beginning of Highway 3 eastern segment
Niagara	Port Colborne	388.9	241.7	Regional Road 84 north (Miller Road)	
Niagara	Port Colborne	394.0	244.8	Regional Road 98 north (Wilhelm Road)	
Niagara	Fort Erie	400.3	248.7	Regional Road 116 (Gorham Road) – Ridgeway, Stevensville	
Niagara	Fort Erie	401.4	249.4	Ridge Road	Formerly Regional Road 118
Niagara	Fort Erie	406.6	252.6	Rosehill Road Highway 3 ends Niagara Regional Road 3 begins	Highway 3 eastern terminus; becomes Regional Road 3 (eastern segment)
Niagara	Fort Erie	409.9	254.7	Regional Road 122 (Thompson Road / Helena Street)	
Niagara	Fort Erie	411.8	255.9	Regional Road 124 (Central Avenue) to Queen Elizabeth Way – Bridge to United States, Toronto	Regional Road 3 eastern terminus; former Highway 3 eastern terminus; connects to Niagara Boulevard
1.000 mi = 1.609 km; 1.000 km = 0.621 mi: Closed/former; Incomplete access; Tolled; Route transition

== See also ==
- List of roads in Essex County, Ontario
