= Ontario Highway 74 =

Former Ontario provincial highway

King's Highway 74
- Elgin County Road 74; Middlesex County Road 74

Route information
- Maintained by Ministry of Transportation of Ontario
- Length: 22.4 km (13.9 mi)
- Existed: September 1937–March 31, 1997

Major junctions
- South end: Highway 3 in New Sarum
- Highway 401 – London, Toronto
- North end: Commissioners Road / County Road 29 (Hamilton Road) near London

Location
- Country: Canada
- Province: Ontario
- Counties: Elgin County, Middlesex County
- Villages: New Sarum, Mapleton, Belmont, Derwent, Nilestown

Highway system
- Ontario provincial highways; Current; Former; 400-series
← Highway 72	→ Highway 77
Former provincial highways
← Highway 73	Highway 75 →

King's Highway 74, commonly referred to as Highway 74, was a provincially maintained highway in the Canadian province of Ontario that travelled north from Highway 3 at New Sarum to Middlesex County Road 29 (Hamilton Road) on the outskirts of London. The 22.4-kilometre-long (13.9 mi) was assumed by the province in September 1937. Aside from paving and the construction of an interchange with Highway 401, it remained generally unchanged for the next six decades until it was decommissioned in 1997 and transferred to Elgin County and Middlesex County. The road has since been redesignated as Elgin County Road 74 and Middlsex County Road 74.

== Route description ==
Highway 74 began at an intersection with Highway 3 in the community of New Sarum, midway between the city of St. Thomas to the west, and the town of Aylmer to the east. It crossed the St. Thomas and Eastern Railway just north of Highway 3 before curving to cross the West Catfish Creek, which it meandered alongside into Mapleton. Immediately north of that community, the route curved to the north and was straight for the remainder of its route. The highway continued, entering the village of Belmont, where it intersected a Canadian Pacific Railway line. North of there it crossed the boundary between Elgin County to the south and Middlesex County to the north. North of the county line, Highway 74 continued into the community of Derwent. Shortly thereafter, it crossed and interchanged with Highway 401 at Exit 195. The highway ended just north of Highway 401 in Nilestown at an intersection with Middlesex County Road 29 (Hamilton Road).

== History ==
Highway 74 was established in mid-1937 when the New Sarum to Dorchester Road was designated by the Department of Highways (DHO), the predecessor to the Ministry of Transportation of Ontario (MTO). The section within Elgin County was assumed by the DHO on August 25, 1937, while the section within Middlesex County was assumed one week later on September 1. Originally an unpaved gravel road, the route was paved between Belmont and its northern terminus by 1938. The remainder of the route was paved in 1952. Otherwise, the route remained generally unchanged for six decades until March 31, 1997, when it was decommissioned in its entirety and transferred to Elgin County and Middlesex County. It has since been known as Elgin County Road 74 and Middlesex County Road 74.

== Major intersections ==
The following table lists the major junctions along Highway 74, as noted by the Ministry of Transportation of Ontario.

Division	Location	km	mi	Destinations	Notes
Elgin	New Sarum	0.0	0.0	Highway 3 (Talbot Line) – St. Thomas	
Elgin	Mapleton	4.0	2.5	County Road 52 (Ron McNeil Line)	
Elgin	Mapleton	6.8	4.2	County Road 48 (Ferguson Line)	
Elgin	Belmont	11.6	7.2	CPR crossing	Southern limits of Belmont
Elgin	Belmont	11.7	7.3	County Road 34 west (Borden Avenue)	
Elgin	Belmont	12.1	7.5	County Road 37 east (Caesar Road)	
Middlesex	Thames Centre	18.2	11.3	County Road 26 west (Wilton Grove Road)	
Middlesex	Thames Centre	19.5	12.1	Highway 401 – London, Toronto	Exit 195
Middlesex	Thames Centre	22.4	13.9	County Road 29 (Hamilton Road) – London	Nilestown
1.000 mi = 1.609 km; 1.000 km = 0.621 mi
