= Ontario Highway 59 =

Former Ontario provincial highway

King's Highway 59

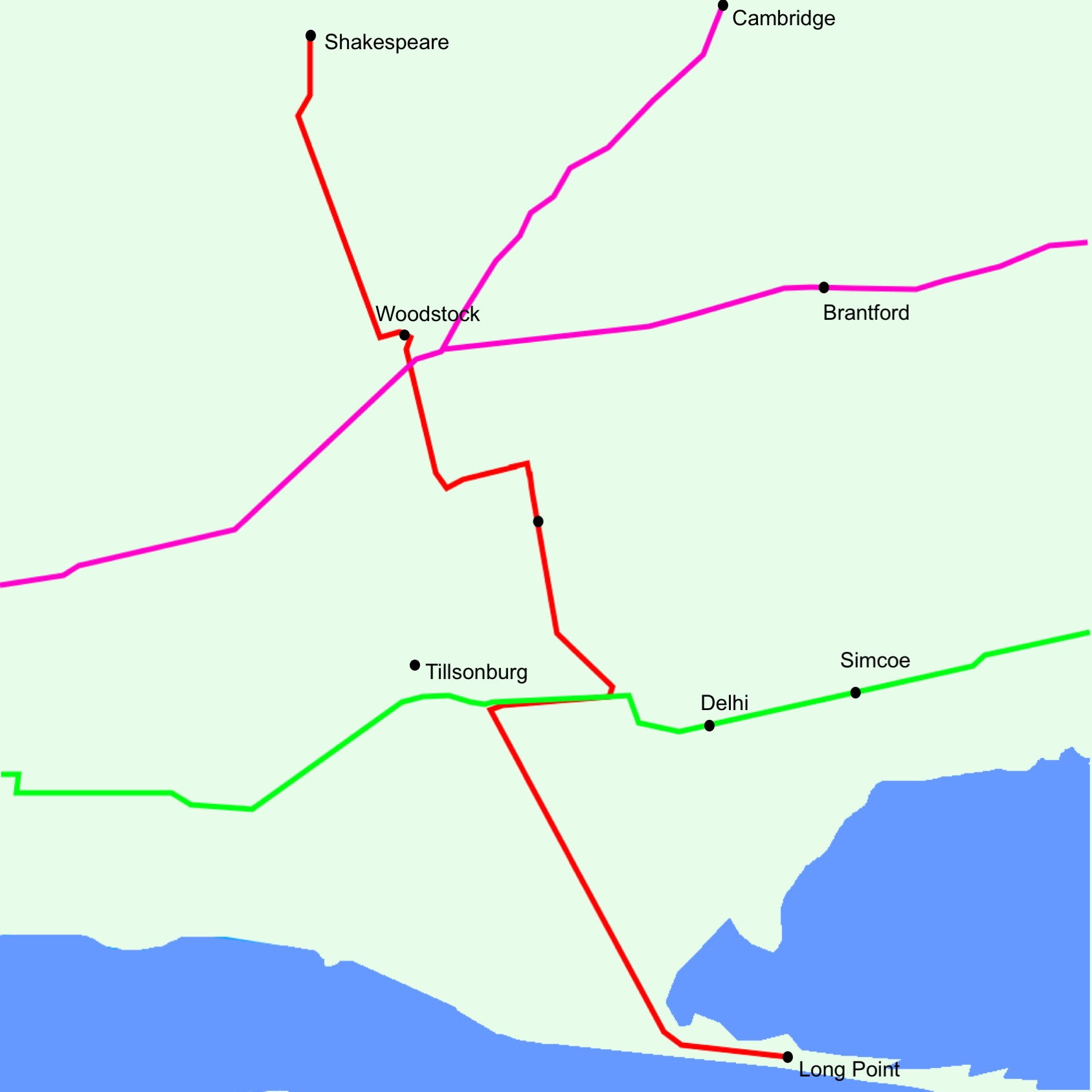
- Highway 59 Route; Highway 59 Highway 3 400 series highways

Route information
- Maintained by Ministry of Transportation of Ontario
- Length: 122.8 km (76.3 mi)
- Existed: August 25, 1937–January 1, 1998

Major junctions
- South end: Long Point Provincial Park
- North end: Shakespeare

Location
- Country: Canada
- Province: Ontario
- Counties: Norfolk, Oxford, Perth
- Major cities: Woodstock
- Towns: Norwich, Tavistock, Delhi
- Villages: Long Point, Courtland, Strathallan, Hickson, Sebastopol, Shakespeare

Highway system
- Ontario provincial highways; Current; Former; 400-series
| ← Highway 58 | → Highway 60 |

King's Highway 59, commonly referred to as Highway 59, was a provincially maintained highway in the Canadian province of Ontario. It connected Long Point Provincial Park in Norfolk County to the town of Shakespeare in Perth County, passing through the city of Woodstock in Oxford County en route. Several smaller towns also lined the highway, notably Courtland, Delhi, Norwich and Tavistock. Highway 59 featured junctions with Highway 3, Highway 2, Norfolk County Highway 24 and the concurrent routes of Highway 7 and Highway 8. Highway 59 also had an interchange with Highway 401.

Highway 59 was established in 1937 between Highway 3 and Highway 2. In 1961, several highways were renumbered, establishing the final alignment of the route and tripling its length. As part of the mass highway transfers performed during the late 1990s, Highway 59 was decommissioned entirely in 1998.

== Route description ==
The route of Highway 59 followed what is now Norfolk Highway 59, Oxford County Road 59 and Perth County Road 107. The majority of this route travels through rural farmland and small communities, which dominates southwestern Ontario, although there are several notable towns encountered along the highway, including Courtland, Delhi, Norwich, Woodstock and Shakespeare.

In the south, the highway begins at the entrance to Long Point Provincial Park, an important bird sanctuary that serves as a migratory waypoint before and after birds cross Lake Erie. Several National Wildlife Areas are also located along the surrounding shoreline. The highway passes through the community of Long Point, then curves northwest. It intersects Norfolk County Highway 24, formerly Highway 24, midway between Long Point and the town of Langton. It encounters Highway 3 approximately 7 kilometres (4.3 mi) east of Tillsonburg in the community of Courtland where it turns east and travels concurrently with it for 10 kilometres (6.2 mi) to the town of Delhi. At an intersection just west of that town, the route continues northwest to the community of Summerville, then curves north to pass through the town of Norwich. Five kilometres (3 mi) north of there, the route curves west and bisects the community of Burgessville. It then curves back to the north and travels straight towards Woodstock.

After crossing Highway 401, the route enters Woodstock, where it is known as Norwich Avenue, Dundas Street and Vansittart Avenue. Dundas Street was also formerly Highway 2, but it was transferred to the County of Oxford at the same time as Highway 59. North of Woodstock, Highway 59 proceeds due north through the communities of Perry Lane, Tollgate, Willow Lake, Huntingford, Strathallan and Hickson before eventually curving northeast near the Oxford–Perth boundary to pass through the town of Tavistock, turning north. Approximately 6 kilometres (3.7 mi) north of Tavistock, the route ends in the town of Shakespeare at an intersection with the concurrent routes of Highway 7 and Highway 8. North of this intersection, the roadway continues as Perth County Road 107.

== History ==
Highway 59 was established in 1937 when the Department of Highways (DHO) assumed the Delhi–Woodstock Road. This 41.0-kilometre (25.5 mi) road was designated on August 25. The route remained unchanged until the early 1960s, when several highways were renumbered effective December 19, 1961. Highway 19 between Woodstock and Shakespeare was redesignated as Highway 59, while Highway 100 between Thamesford and St. Marys was redesignated as Highway 19. On July 20, 1961, Highway 59 was extended south from Courtland to Long Point Provincial Park along Norfolk County roads 8 and 8A, which the DHO rebuilt in the years prior. A concurrency was also established along Highway 3 between Courtland and Delhi. These extensions nearly tripled the length of the highway to 120.1 kilometres (74.6 mi). The route remained this way for nearly four decades. However, on January 1, 1998, as part of budget cutbacks, several highways were transferred to local jurisdiction. Highway 59 was transferred the counties of Norfolk, Oxford and Perth, decommissioning the route entirely.

== Major intersections ==
The following table lists the major junctions along Highway 59, as noted by the Ministry of Transportation of Ontario.

| Division | Location | km | mi | Destinations | Notes |
|---|---|---|---|---|---|
| Norfolk County | | 0.0 | 0.0 | Old Cut Boulevard | Long Point Provincial Park entrance gate |
| Norfolk County | | 8.0 | 5.0 | County Road 42 (Lakeshore Road) | |
| Norfolk County | | 10.7 | 6.6 | County Road 22 (1st Concession Road) | Since decommissioned |
| Norfolk County | | 16.4 | 10.2 | Highway 24 north | Highway 24 decommissioned on April 1, 1997 |
| Norfolk County | | 21.9 | 13.6 | County Road 45 | |
| Norfolk County | | 24.6 | 15.3 | County Road 1 (McDowell) – Simcoe | |
| Norfolk County | | 28.8 | 17.9 | County Road 21 | |
| Norfolk County | | 37.8 | 23.5 | County Road 38 west (Colonel Talbot Road) – Straffordville | Route of Talbot Trail; community of Ronson |
| Norfolk County | | 39.1 | 24.3 | Highway 3 west – Tillsonburg | Beginning of Highway 3 concurrency |
| Norfolk County | | 40.3 | 25.0 | County Road 38 west (Colonel Talbot Road) | Community of Courtland |
| Norfolk County | | 46.1 | 28.6 | County Road 16 (Rhineland Road) – Rhineland | |
| Norfolk County | | 50.4 | 31.3 | Highway 3 east – Simcoe | End of Highway 3 concurrency; community of Delhi |
| Oxford | Norwich | 56.2 | 34.9 | County Road 37 (Potters Road) | |
| Oxford | Norwich | 61.0 | 37.9 | County Road 19 (Otterville Road) – Otterville | |
| Oxford | Norwich | 67.4 | 41.9 | County Road 18 (Norwich Road) – Scotland | |
| Oxford | Norwich | 72.4 | 45.0 | County Road 14 | |
| Oxford | Norwich | 72.7 | 45.2 | County Road 21 (New Durham Road) – New Durham | |
| Oxford | Norwich | 79.7 | 49.5 | County Road 46 (Salford Road) – Holbrook | |
| Oxford | Norwich | 80.0 | 49.7 | County Road 13 – Holbrook | |
| Oxford | Norwich | 86.1 | 53.5 | County Road 40 (Curries Road) | |
| Oxford | Woodstock | 90.6 | 56.3 | Highway 401 – London, Toronto | |
| Oxford | Woodstock | 91.9 | 57.1 | County Road 15 (Parkinson Road) | |
| Oxford | Woodstock | 93.2 | 57.9 | Highway 2 east (Dundas Street) – Paris | Beginning of Highway 2 concurrency; Highway 59 turns south onto Norwich Avenue |
| Oxford | Woodstock | 94.4 | 58.7 | Highway 2 west (Dundas Street) – London | End of Highway 2 concurrency; Highway 59 turns north onto Vansittart Avenue |
| Oxford | Woodstock | 95.7 | 59.5 | County Road 35 (Devonshire Avenue) | |
| Oxford | Woodstock | 96.2 | 59.8 | Thames River crossing | |
| Oxford | East Zorra – Tavistock | | | | |
| Oxford | East Zorra – Tavistock | 97.8 | 60.8 | County Road 17 (Road 74) | |
| Oxford | East Zorra – Tavistock | 100.8 | 62.6 | County Road 33 (Road 78) – Embro, Innerkip | |
| Oxford | East Zorra – Tavistock | 107.1 | 66.5 | County Road 8 (Road 88) | Community of Hickson |
| Oxford | East Zorra – Tavistock | 113.2 | 70.3 | County Road 28 (Road 96) | |
| Oxford | East Zorra – Tavistock | 115.3 | 71.6 | County Road 34 north | |
| Oxford | East Zorra – Tavistock | 117.1 | 72.8 | County Road 24 (Perth–Oxford Road) | Community of Tavistock |
| Perth | Shakespeare | 122.8 | 76.3 | Highway 7 / Highway 8 – Stratford, Kitchener | |
1.000 mi = 1.609 km; 1.000 km = 0.621 mi
