= List of numbered roads in Norfolk County =

List of county roads

This page lists all of the numbered county roads in Norfolk County, Ontario, Canada.

== County Highways ==
Number	Names	Western/Southern Terminus	Eastern/Northern Terminus	Major Communities	Comments
Norfolk County Highway 6	Main Street	County Highway 24	Highway 6	Port Dover	Downloaded portion of Highway 6
Norfolk County Highway 19	Vienna Road	Oxford County Border	Oxford County Border		Short portion of former Highway 19 within county limits
Norfolk County Highway 24	Norfolk Street	County Highway 59	Highway 3, where it continues as Highway 24	Simcoe	Downloaded portion of Highway 24
Norfolk County Highway 59		Lake Erie Shoreline	Oxford County Border (Continues as Oxford Road 59)	Long Point, Port Rowan, Walsingham, Langton, Courtland, Delhi	Formerly Highway 59

== County Roads ==
Number	Names	Western/Southern Terminus	Eastern/Northern Terminus	Major Communities	Comments
Norfolk County Road 1	McDowell Road, West Street, Talbot Street, Robinson Street	County Highway 59	County Highway 24	Pinegrove, Blayney, Green's Corners, Bill's Corners, Hillcrest, Simcoe	
Norfolk County Road 3	St. John's Road	CR 16	Haldimand County Border (Continues as Haldimand Road 3)	Walsh	
Norfolk County Road 4	Church Street, Brantford Road	Highway 3	Brant County Border (Continues as Brant Road 4)	Delhi, Vanessa	
Norfolk County Road 5	Chapman Street, Silver Lake Drive, Cockshutt Road	County Highway 6	Brant County Border (Continues as Brant Road 44)	Port Dover, Renton, Boston	
Norfolk County Road 9	Windham Centre Road, Thompson Road	CR 4	Haldimand County Border (Continues as Haldimand Road 9)	Windham Centre, Waterford, Villa Nova	
Norfolk County Road 10	Turkey Point Road	Cedar Drive (Turkey Point)	Highway 3	Walsh, Turkey Point	
Norfolk County Road 13		Highway 3	Oxford County Border (Continues as Oxford Road 13)	Courtland	
Norfolk County Road 16	Forestry Farm Road, Rhineland Road	Waterfront at Booth's Harbour	Highway 3	St. Williams	
Norfolk County Road 19		Oxford County Border (Continues as Oxford Road 19)	Haldimand County Border (Continues as Haldimand Road 19)	Bookton, Vanessa, Boston	
Norfolk County Road 20	Indian Line Road	Brant County Border (Continues as Brant Road 20)	Haldimand County Border (Continues as Haldimand Road 20)		
Norfolk County Road 21	Lynedoch Road	CR 23	Highway 3	Glen Meyer, Andy's Corners, Wyecombe, Lynedoch	
Norfolk County Road 23		CR 42	CR 38	Glen Meyer	
Norfolk County Road 24	"Old Highway 24"	Highway 24	Brant County Border (Continues as Brant Road 24)	Bloomsburg, Waterford, Wilsonville	
Norfolk County Road 25	Nixon Road, Teeterville Road, Kelvin Road	Highway 3	Brant County Border (Continues as Brant Road 25)	Nixon, Windham Centre, Teeterville, Kelvin	
Norfolk County Road 28		CR 42	CR 23	Fairground	
Norfolk County Road 30		CR 38	County Highway 19	Mabee's Corners	
Norfolk County Road 34	Queen Street	CR 1	Highway 3	Simcoe	This county road is unsigned; however appears on county maps
Norfolk County Road 35	Hunt Street, Second Avenue	Highway 3	Highway 24	Simcoe	
Norfolk County Road 37	Swimming Pool Road	Highway 3	Oxford County Border (Continues as Oxford Road 37)	Delhi	
Norfolk County Road 38	Colonel Talbot Road	Elgin County Border (Continues as Elgin Road 38)	Highway 3	Courtland	
Norfolk County Road 40	Park Road, 14th Street	Highway 3	Highway 24	Simcoe	
Norfolk County Road 41	Hillcrest Road	CR 1	Highway 3	Simcoe	
Norfolk County Road 42	Lakeshore Road	Elgin County Border	CR 16	Houghton, Clear Creek, Port Rowan, St. Williams	
Norfolk County Road 45		Elgin County Border	CR 16	Frogmore	
Norfolk County Road 46	Pinegrove Road	CR 21	Highway 3	Gilbertville, Pinegrove	
Norfolk County Road 51	Simcoe Street	Oxford County Border (Continues as Oxford Road 51)	Highway 3		Formerly Highway 3B
Norfolk County Road 57	Port Ryerse Road	Lake Erie Shoreline	County Highway 24	Port Ryerse	
Norfolk County Road 58	Fisher's Glen Road	County Highway 24	Old Brock Street/Vittoria Road	Vittoria	
Norfolk County Road 60		CR 23	County Highway 59		
Norfolk County Road 67	La Salette Road	CR 37	Windham Road 19	La Salette	
Norfolk County Road 74		Highway 3	CR 9		
