= Ontario Highway 73 =

Former Ontario provincial highway

King's Highway 73

Route information
- Maintained by the Ministry of Transportation of Ontario
- Length: 38.9 km (24.2 mi)
- Existed: August 25, 1937–January 1, 1998

Major junctions
- South end: Colin Street, Port Bruce
- Highway 3 – Aylmer; Highway 401
- North end: County Road 29 (Hamilton Road) – Dorchester, Ingersoll

Location
- Country: Canada
- Province: Ontario

Highway system
- Ontario provincial highways; Current; Former; 400-series
| ← Highway 72 | → Highway 77 |
Former provincial highways
| Highway 74 → |

King's Highway 73, commonly referred to as Highway 73, was a provincially maintained highway in the Canadian province of Ontario. The route began in Port Bruce and progressed north through Aylmer, encountering Highway 401 immediately before terminating east of Dorchester. The route was established in mid-1937, remaining unchanged for nearly six decades before being transferred to Elgin County and Middlesex County in 1997 and 1998. Today the route is known as Elgin County Road 73 and Middlesex County Road 73.

== Route description ==
Highway 73 began near the Lake Erie shoreline in Port Bruce, at Colin Street. From there it crossed Catfish Creek and veered east to Copenhagen, where it turned northward. The route progressed north through Elgin County, serving the communities of Candyville and Dunboyne en route to the town of Aylmer, where it intersected Highway 3. From there it continued north through Little Aylmer and Lyons before crossing into Middlesex County.

Within Middlesex County, the highway served the communities of Harrietsville and Mossley, crossing a Canadian Pacific rail line immediately south of the latter. It encountered an interchange with Highway 401 (Exit 203) southwest of Dorchester, ending soon thereafter at an intersection with Middlesex County Road 29.

== History ==
A recently paved Highway 73 approaching Copenhagen in 1950

The Port Bruce to Dorchester Road was assumed by the Department of Highways on August 25, 1937. Initially only the portion of the route within Aylmer was paved. However, by 1942 the highway had been paved north to the Springfield cutoff (now Ron McNeil Line). Between 1949 and 1952, the section south of Aylmer to Port Bruce was paved. The remainder was paved by 1953.

The routing of the highway remained unchanged for nearly sixty years. However, it was decommissioned entirely during the 1997 and 1998 highway transfers. On April 1, 1997, the highway south of Aylmer was transferred to the jurisdiction of Elgin County, and the highway north of the Highway 401 interchange was transferred to Middlesex County. Eight months later, on January 1, 1998, the remainder of the highway was transferred to the two counties.

== Major intersections ==
The following table lists the major junctions along Highway 73, as noted by the Ministry of Transportation of Ontario.

| Division | Location | km | mi | Destinations | Notes |
|---|---|---|---|---|---|
| Elgin | Port Bruce | 0.0 | 0.0 | Colin Street | |
| Elgin | Aylmer | 15.6 | 9.7 | Highway 3 – St. Thomas | |
| Middlesex | Thames Centre | 37.5 | 23.3 | Highway 401 – London | Exit 203; Dorchester Swamp |
| Middlesex | Dorchester | 38.9 | 24.2 | County Road 29 | |
1.000 mi = 1.609 km; 1.000 km = 0.621 mi
