= Ryan's Law (Canada) =

Ryan's Law is an Ontario, Canada law that forces schools to allow children to have their inhalers with them. It is named after Ryan Gibbons of Straffordville, Ontario who died on 9 October 2012 aged 12, because his school would not let him carry his inhaler with him.
