= Mount Salem =

Mount Salem may refer to:

- Mount Salem, Ontario, a community in Canada
- Mount Salem, a community in Union Township, Hunterdon County, New Jersey, United States
