= Southwold Earthworks =

Archaeological site in Southwold, Ontario, Canada

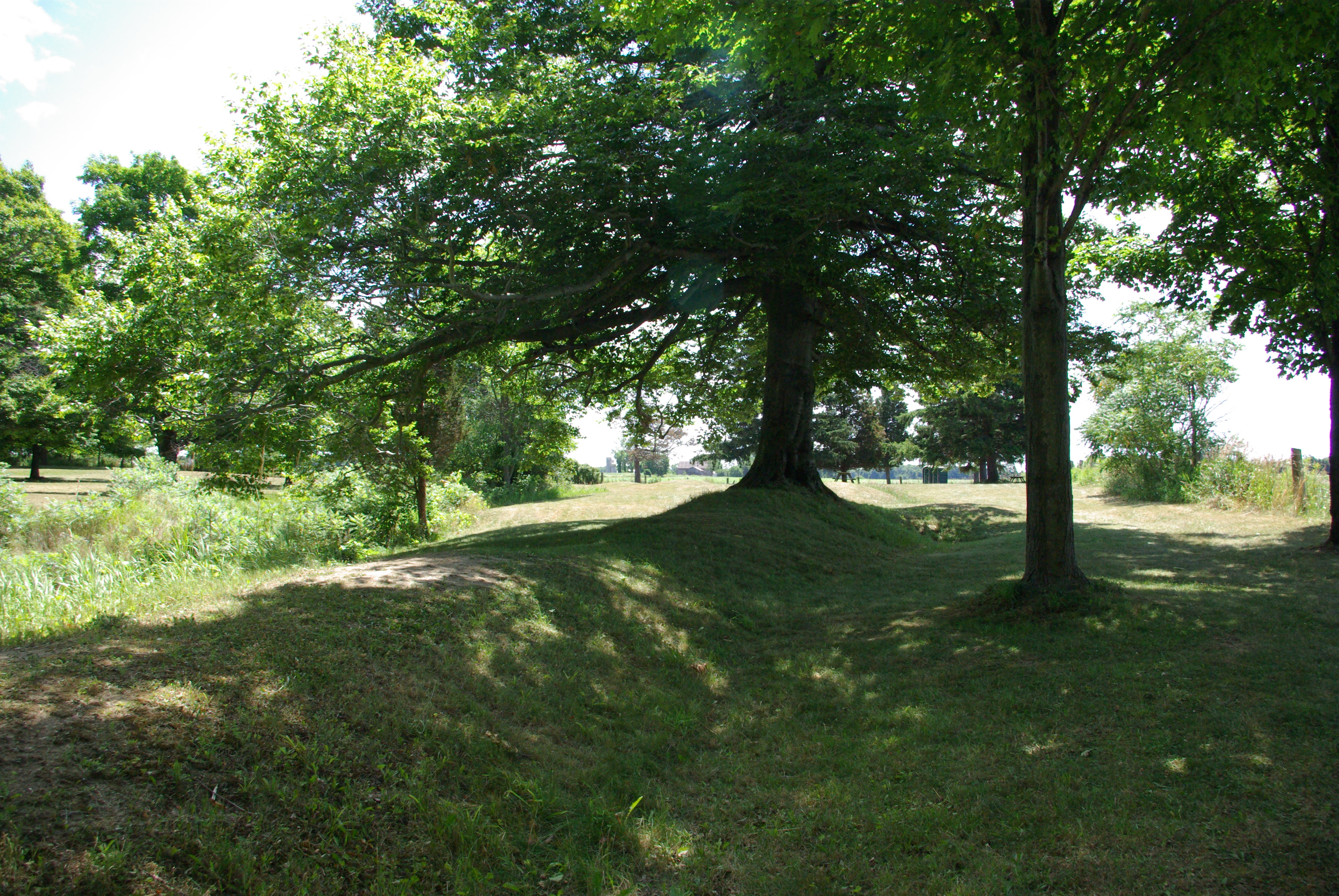
- Trees growing out of the remains of raised earthworks at the site.
- Interactive map of Southwold Earthworks
- 42.674250°N 81.359634°W
- Type: Fortified settlement
- Cultures: Neutral people
- Location: Southwold, Ontario, Canada
- Region: Great Lakes

History
- Built: 1500 CE
- Abandoned: 1650 CE

Site notes
- Excavation dates: 1935, 1976
- Management: Parks Canada
- Public access: Yes
- Website: Parks Canada

National Historic Site of Canada
- Official name: Southwold Earthworks National Historic Site
- Designated: 1923

The Southwold Earthworks is the remains of a pre-contact village site of the Neutral people, occupied about AD 1450 to 1550. The entrance to the site is located on Iona Road, approximately three kilometres south of Iona Ontario, Canada. A double oval ring of raised earthworks surrounds the remains of the village.

== Background ==
Occupied between AD 1450 and 1550, it is located in southwestern Ontario in rural Elgin County, near the banks of a tributary of Talbot Creek, approximately 20 km west of St. Thomas, Ontario. Archaeological investigations have indicated the presence at one time of eighteen longhouses of various sizes within the village, with an estimated population of 800-900 people. These native inhabitants were the Attiwandaronk (Attarawandon) Indians, an Iroquoian-speaking people called the Neutrals by the French colonists. An open area in the centre of the community appears to have provided a common activity area or meeting place. The archaeological interpretation concludes that Southwold was a typical pre-contact Neutral village, palisaded for defensive purposes.

The site consists of an oval ring of earthworks enclosing archaeological remains of a double palisade and village, which may have included up to 24 longhouses. Estimated to have originally been about 0.8 hectares (2 acres) in size, the village was surrounded by a double ring of earthworks, which served as the foundation for a double ring of upright pickets or palisades, which completely circled the village. The main entrance was believed to have been located at the northeast corner of the earthworks. Two other openings, one on the northwest and one in the southern section of the perimeter, permitted a small stream to flow between the rows of palisades.

== Heritage recognition ==
The Southwold Earthworks was one of the first sites considered for official recognition by the Historic Sites and Monuments Board of Canada. The site was designated a National Historic Site of Canada in 1923 and was purchased by the Canadian federal government in 1929.

== Archaeological investigations ==
Two major archaeological investigations were conducted at Southwold Earthworks, in 1935 during the Great Depression and in 1976. Oral tradition within the local Oneida community recounts that Southwold was used as a ceremonial site, which was enclosed by the palisade so that activities taking place within the village were screened from the view of people outside the wall. According to the same oral tradition, the site would have been occupied not as a year-round village, but as a seasonal place of pilgrimage. The palisade was not defensive in nature, but protected a center for healing and purification rituals.

Archaeologists found the site atypical of Neutral villages of the period: it is located on flat land with no natural defensive advantages and, despite the presence of apparent fortifications, it contains no evidence of ever having been attacked. Although archaeological estimates of site population were that about 800 people could have lived there, the site has little evidence of the refuse and garbage of occupation.
