= Mount Salem, Ontario =

Mount Salem
- Dispersed Rural Community
- Location in southern Ontario
- Coordinates: 42°42′44″N 80°56′03″W
- Country: Canada
- Province: Ontario
- County: Elgin
- Municipality: Malahide
- Elevation: 221 m (725 ft)
- Time zone: UTC-5 (Eastern Time Zone)
  - Summer (DST): UTC-4 (Eastern Time Zone)
- Postal Code: N5H 2R5
- Area codes: 519, 226, 548

Mount Salem is a Dispersed Rural Community and unincorporated place in the municipal township of Malahide, Elgin County in southwestern Ontario, Canada. The community is in geographic Malahide Township at the intersection of Elgin County Road 40 (Springfield Road) and Elgin County Road 45 (Calton Line), 7.8 kilometres (4.8 mi) southeast of the community of Aylmer.

The community has two churches, Sommerfeld Mennonite Church and Mount Salem Evangelical Mennonite Church, and Mount Salem Christian School, a JK–12 primary and secondary interdenominational Christian school that uses the facilities of the aforementioned two churches.
