= List of numbered roads in Haldimand County =

This is a list of numbered roads in Haldimand County, Ontario. There are two classes of numbered roads in Haldimand County: regional roads, former King's Highways downloaded to county responsibility in the late 1990s, and county roads, analogous to the county roads of other counties.

== County Roads ==
County Road #	Local name(s)	Northern/Western Terminus	Southern/Eastern Terminus	Settlements served	Additional Notes
2	Caistorville Road	Niagara Region limits	County Road 14	Canborough	
3	Rainham Road; Main Street East; North Shore Drive	Norfolk County limits	Niagara Region limits	Lambs Corners, Selkirk, Rainham Centre, South Cayuga, Byng, Dunnville, Stromness, Lowbanks	
7	Marshagan Road	Niagara Region limits	King's Highway 3	Moulton Station	
8	Kohler Road	King's Highway 3	Lake Shore Road	Kohler, Rainham Centre	
9	Concession 12 Walpole; Parkview Drive; Indian Line; County Road 9 York Road	Norfolk County Road 74	Niagara Region limits	Hagersville, Clanbrassil, Cranston, York, Empire Corners	shares Indian Line with County Road 20 from Parkview Drive to Concession 11 Walpole
11	Port Maitland Road	County Road 3	the Grand River	Byng, Port Maitland West	
12	Fisherville Road	County Road 20	County Road 3	Fisherville	
14	Chippawa Street	Niagara Region limits	King's Highway 3	Canborough	
15	Robinson Road	Niagara Region limits	King's Highway 3	Attercliffe Station	
17	County Road 17	King's Highway 3	Main Street, Dunnville	Cayuga, Dunnville	
18	Sandusk Road	County Road 20	County Road 3	Sandusk, Lambs Corners	
20	Indian Line	County Road 20	County Road 3	East Oakland	shares Indian Line with County Road 9 from Parkview Drive to Concession 11 Walpole
22	McClung Road	Regional Road 54	County Road 66	none	minor connecting route
27	Concession 11 Walpole	Norfolk County road 74	County Road 20	none	minor rural route
29	4th Line	Six Nations reserve limits	County Road 9	Willow Grove, Cranston	
32	County Road 32	King's Highway 3	County Road 17	none	minor connecting route
33	County Road 33	Haldibrook Road	County Road 66	none	minor connecting route
49	Aikens Road	County Road 3	Lake Shore Road	James Allan Provincial Park	
50	County Road 50	County Road 3	Lake Shore Road	Upper, Bodri Bay	
53	Walpole-Rainham Road	County Road 20	County Road 3	Balmoral, Selkirk	
55	Nanticoke Road	County Road 20	Hickory Beach Lane	Springvale, Hickory Beach	
61	Taylor Road	King's Highway 3	County Road 3	Dunnville	minor connecting route
63	Canborough Road	County Road 14	Niagara Region limits	Canborough	
64	Rymer Road	Siddall Road	County Road 3	Port Maitland East	
65	Hutchinson Road	King's Highway 3	County Road 3	Mount Carmel, Lowbanks	
66	County Road 66; Stoney Creek Road	County Road 22	Haldibrook Road	none	minor rural route
70	Walpole-Woodhouse Line	King's Highway 3	County Road 3	Varency	
74	Townsend Parkway; Keith Richardson Parkway	Norfolk County limits	King's Highway 3	Townsend	

== Regional Roads ==
Regional Road #	Northern/Western Terminus	Southern/Eastern Terminus	Settlements served	Additional Notes
54	Brant County limits	King's Highway 3	Caledonia, Sims Lock Road, York, Indiana ghost town, Cayuga	also known as Caithness Street in Caledonia and Munsee Street in Cayuga
56	Haldibrook Road	King's Highway 3	Empire Corners	continues as a regional road through Hamilton to QEW
