= Jarvis, Ontario =

Community in Haldimand County, Ontario, Canada

Jarvis
- Unincorporated Community
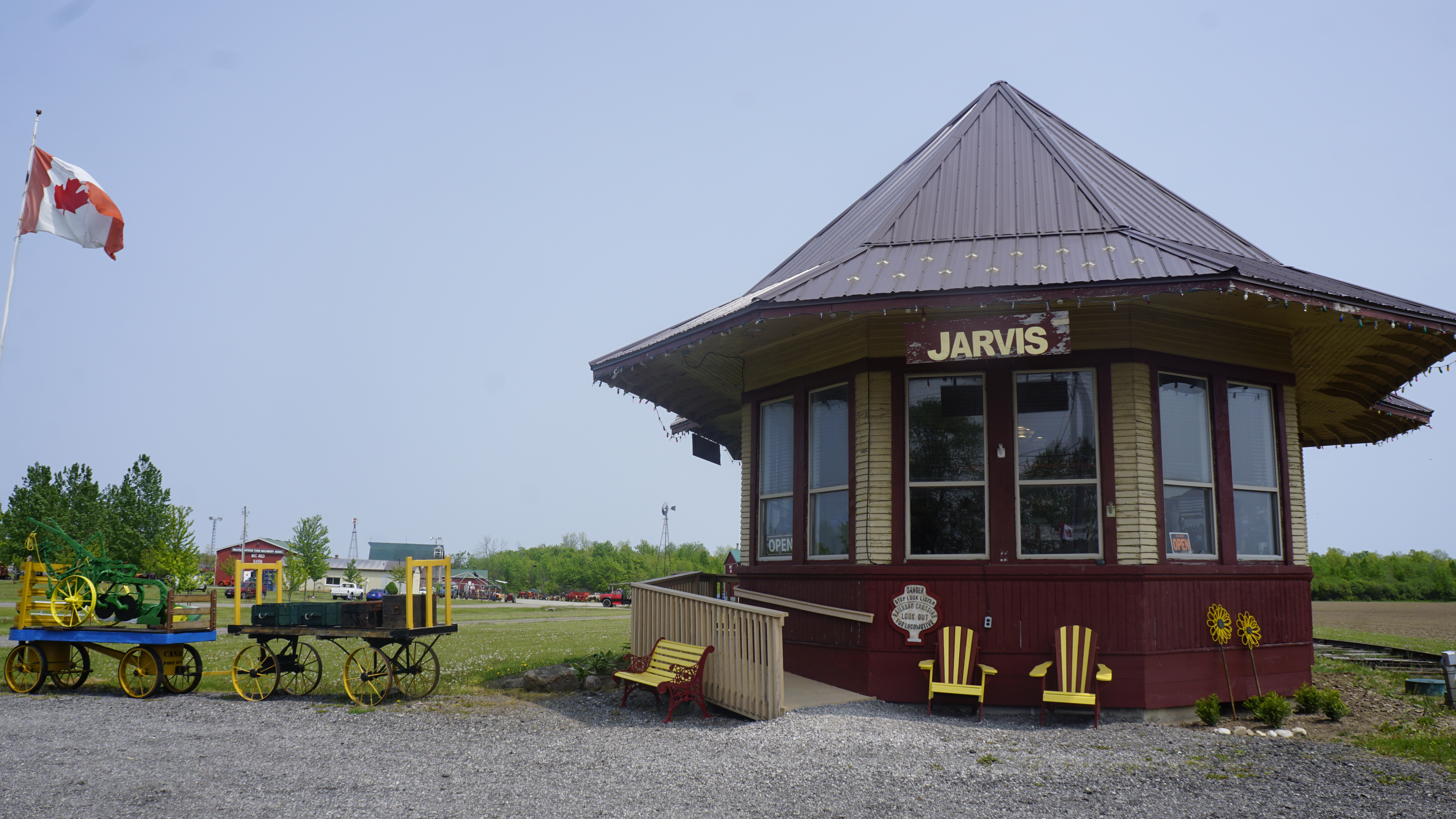
- The Jarvis Train Station

- Location in southern Ontario
- Coordinates: 42°53′04″N 80°06′50″W
- Country: Canada
- Province: Ontario
- County: Haldimand

Government
  - Mayor of Haldimand: Shelley Ann Bentley
  - Governing body: The Council of the Corporation of Haldimand County
  - Ward 1 (Jarvis & Townsend) Councillor: Stewart Patterson
  - MP: Leslyn Lewis (Conservative)
  - MPP: Bobbi Ann Brady (Independent)

Area
  - Land: 0.52 km^{2} (0.20 sq mi)
- Elevation: 184 m (604 ft)

Population (2021)
  - Total: 1,214
  - Density: 2,159.8/km^{2} (5,594/sq mi)
- Time zone: UTC−05:00 (EST)
  - Summer (DST): UTC−04:00 (EDT)
- Postal code span: N0A 1J0
- Area code: (519)

Jarvis is a small community in Haldimand County, Ontario, Canada.

This community is located near the towns of Simcoe, Townsend, Cayuga, Port Dover and Hagersville. Highway 3 and Highway 6 form a crossroads near the centre of the community.

== History ==
Jarvis is located on land originally granted to William Jarvis, Provincial Secretary of Upper Canada from 1792 to 1817.

On May 24, 1873, a fire destroyed a quarter of the town. Although there were no deaths a large amount of wooden structures in town were destroyed.

The town was much bigger in the early 1900s, featuring 4 churches, 4 hotels, 5 blacksmiths, a school, brickyard, and cheese factories.

On September 26, 1991, a natural gas explosion occurred at a residence in town, injuring the homeowner. The then population of 1300 people were evacuated for 4 days. Natural gas lines, electricity lines, and phone lines into town were disabled until the all clear was given.

== Demographics ==
Canada census – Jarvis community profile

	2021	2016
Population	1,214 (+12% from 2016)	1,037 (+13.6% from 2011)
Land area	0.56 km^{2} (0.22 sq mi)	0.52 km^{2} (0.20 sq mi)
Population density	2,159.8/km^{2} (5,594/sq mi)	1,987.4/km^{2} (5,147/sq mi)
Median age	39.6 (M: 38.4, F: 40.4)	39.1 (M: 36.5, F: 41.8)
Private dwellings	425 (total)	375 (total)
Median household income	$92,000	$70,912

References: 2021 2016

=== Ethnicity ===
Only those ethnicities which compose more than 1% of the population have been included.

Ethnic Groups in the Community of Jarvis, Ontario (2021)
Ethnic Group	2021		2016	
Ethnic Group	Pop.	%	Pop.	%
Canadian	275	22.65%	460	44.36%
English	370	30.48%	460	44.36%
Irish	305	25.12%	260	25.07%
Scottish	235	19.36%	265	25.55%
French (Note: Statistic includes all individuals that identified as having a French origin but not otherwise specified.)	30	2.47%	140	13.5%
German	220	18.12%	185	17.84%
Italian	85	7%	30	2.89%
Ukrainian	20	1.65%	35	3.38%
Dutch	110	9.06%	75	7.23%
Polish	45	3.71%	25	2.41%
Québécois	30	2.47%	0	0%
French Canadian	15	1.24%		
Russian	25	2.06%	0	0%
Norwegian	15	1.24%	0	0%
Welsh	30	2.47%	20	1.93%
Portuguese	40	3.29%	0	0%
American	20	1.65%	10	0.96%
Hungarian	35	2.88%	15	1.45%
Total responses	1,275	105.02%	1,065	102.7%
Total population	1,214	100%	1,037	100%
Note: Totals greater than 100% due to multiple origin responses.

=== Language ===
As of the 2021 census, there were 1,185 citizens that spoke English only and 25 that spoke both official languages.

=== Religion ===
As of the 2021 census, there were 770 and 495 as non-religious and secular perspectives.

== Education ==
Schools include Jarvis Community Christian School (a member of the Ontario Alliance of Christian Schools) and Jarvis Public School.

Jarvis Public School has 22 students enrolled in grade 6 as of the 2017-18 school year. Slightly over 18% of the students at Jarvis Public School have some form of developmental disability. Grade 3 and 6 students at Jarvis Public perform the best at writing and the worst at mathematics. Recent testing has indicated that 40% of Jarvis Public School students in grade 3 and grade 6 are experiencing troubles coping with the current Ontario curriculum. Female students have somewhat of a greater edge over the male students in reading; but the gulf between the male students and the female students is not so significant in math.

==

== Business ==
Businesses in the town of Jarvis include a gas station, an award winning microbrewery, several restaurants, and two convenience stores. Jarvis also has a community centre that holds Jack and Jills along with weddings and other events.

There is also a car dealership that also sells motorcycle trikes, a flower store, a new and gently used children's clothing shop along with a butcher shop and bakery. There was only one bank in Jarvis (CIBC), which had served Jarvis since 1898 and officially closed on May 24, 2018, due to lack of business.

== Royal Canadian Air Force Station Jarvis ==
During World War II the Royal Canadian Air Force built and operated No. 1 Bombing & Gunnery School as part of the British Commonwealth Air Training Plan on a 600-acre site 6 kilometers southeast of Jarvis. A historical plaque on Concession 2 Walpole marks the location, and the reverse side of the plaque lists the names of the thirty-eight Commonwealth airmen and one civilian who died while serving at No. 1 B&GS.

The air station appears in the 1942 Hollywood movie Captains of the Clouds.
