= Vienna, Ontario =

Community in Ontario, Canada

Coordinates: 42.680703°N 80.794498°W

Vienna is an unincorporated community in the Elgin County of Ontario, Canada. It is recognized as a designated place by Statistics Canada.

== Demographics ==
In the 2021 Census of Population conducted by Statistics Canada, Vienna had a population of 736 living in 235 of its 249 total private dwellings, a change of −4.8% from its 2016 population of 773. With a land area of 2.71 km^{2} (1.05 sq mi), it had a population density of 271.6/km^{2} (703.4/sq mi) in 2021.

== See also ==
- List of communities in Ontario
- List of designated places in Ontario
