= Langton, Ontario =

Community of Norfolk County, Ontario, Canada

- Unincorporated Hamlet in Norfolk County
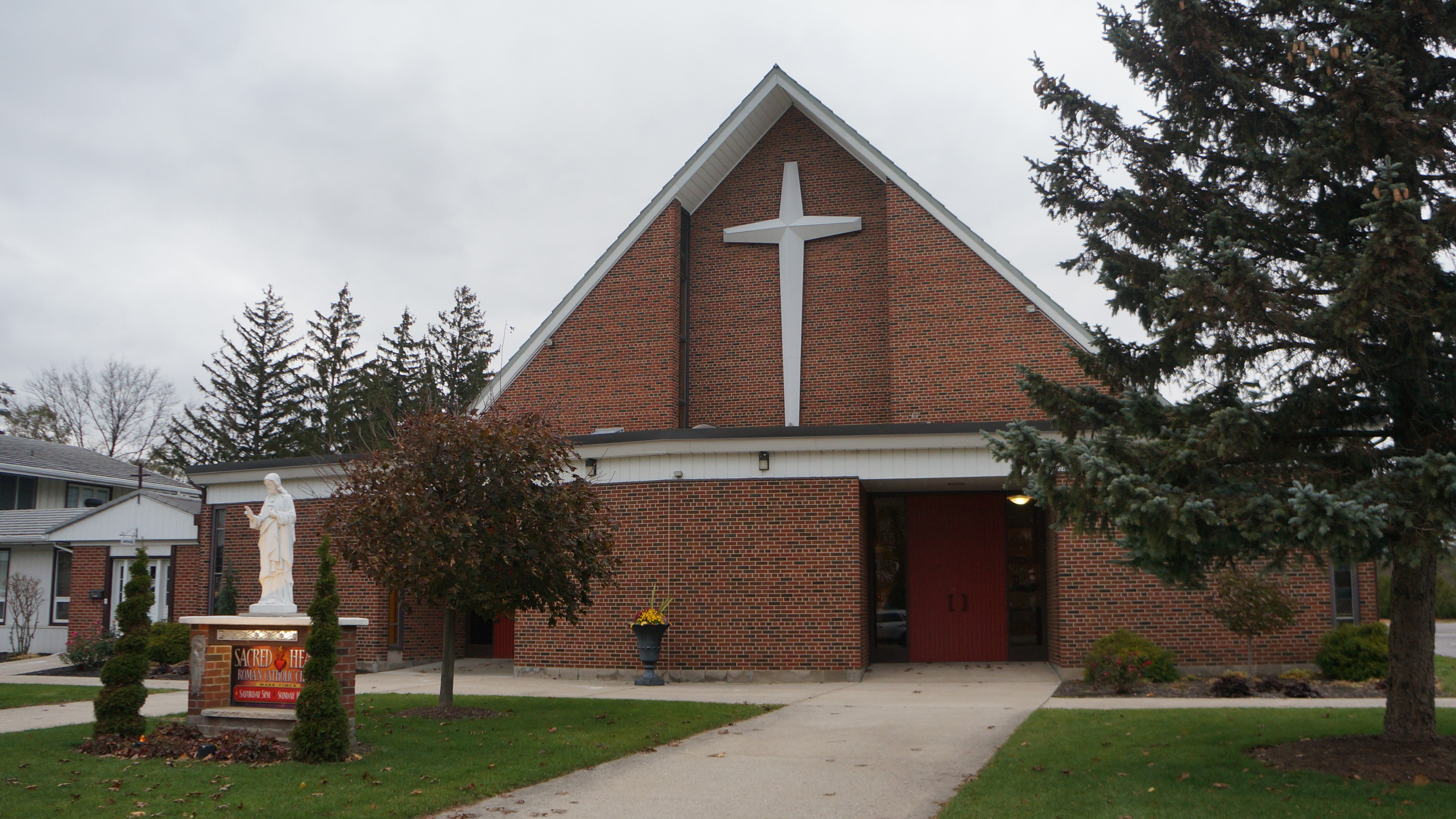
- Sacred Heart Church

- Location of Langton in Ontario
- Coordinates: 42°44′31″N 80°34′43″W
- Country: Canada
- Province: Ontario
- Amalgamated into Norfolk County: 2001 (Single-tier municipality)

Government
  - Mayor: Amy Martin
  - Governing Body: The Council of The Corporation of Norfolk County
  - MPs: Leslyn Lewis (Con)
  - MPPs: Bobbi Ann Brady (Independent)
- Elevation: 228 m (748 ft)
- Time zone: UTC-5 (EST)
  - Summer (DST): UTC-4 (EDT)
- Forward sortation area: N0E
- Area codes: 519 and 226
- Website: www.norfolkcounty.ca

Langton is a small town located in Norfolk County; formerly known as Boughner's Corner.

The town can be accessed by travelling to the intersection just slightly to the west of Courtland and turning south on Ontario provincial Highway 59 if coming from Delhi, south if coming from Tillsonburg or if travelling eastbound on Ontario Provincial Highway 3, and straight ahead if travelling southbound using Ontario provincial Highway 59.

== Summary ==
Langton once had two banks but the CIBC bank closed in May 2016 due to increased online banking activity and the changing Canadian economy; placing the future of offline banking in this community in definite jeopardy. Despite its small population, Langton was considered to be a banking hub for the tobacco farmers during the 20th century. The Bank of Montreal branch closed permanently in August 2020, with COVID-19 attributing to its closure, becoming the second bank to close in Langton.

The Langton Baptist Churchyard is the local cemetery in the area. Having a significant amount of history to it, there are at least 600 individuals, or families, who are buried in the cemetery. Common last names found at the cemetery include Anscombe, Armstrong, Atkinson, Bain, Balcomb, and Boughner. The Langton Baptist Churchyard cemetery is still functional as of 2020.

Sidewalks exist only on the main street, otherwise, walking in this town is simple. A typical walking expedition lasts approximately 3-5 kilometers; depending on the participants' activity levels. Langton enjoys scenery that is very rural and flat. Streets can be busy sometimes; especially during the weekdays. Possible activities include hiking, walking, running, and cycling. Langton is the hometown of Canadian dart champion Bob Sinnaeve.

They have been able to receive cable television service since approximately 2011.

Since children of elementary school age who live in Andy's Corners attend Langton Public School or Sacred Heart School, Andy's Corners is considered to be a subdivision of Langton. Langton was home to the Langton Thunderbirds, a junior hockey team that played in the Southern Ontario Junior Hockey League. Langton has two schools: Langton Public School and Sacred Heart Catholic School.

Many locals claim the streets of Langton used to be paved with gold, due to the many tobacco farms being located near Langton thus creating a wealthy local industry.

=== Climate ===
The winter of 1975 was the only unusually mild winter in the region from 1897 to 1977. From the late 1990s onwards, winters became more mild due to changes in climate brought on by global warming. Langton traditionally belongs to the humid continental climate zone, even with the recent mild winters and warmer dry summers. As in all communities, towns and cities throughout the world, global warming due to human industrial activity has drastically altered the climate of Langton over the decades.

The warmest summers that Langton has witnessed occurred in 1998, 2003, 2005, 2006, 2007, 2009 (with the exception of the month of July), 2010, 2012, 2013, 2014, 2015 and 2016.
