= Townsend, Ontario =

Planned community in Haldimand County, Ontario, Canada

Townsend
- Unincorporated Community
- Motto: "Design with you in mind"
- Location within Ontario Location within Canada
- Coordinates: 42.894862°N 80.142034°W
- Country: Canada
- Province: Ontario
- County: Haldimand

Government
  - Mayor of Haldimand: Shelly Ann Bentley
  - Ward 1 (Jarvis & Townsend) Councillor: Stewart Patterson
  - MP: Leslyn Lewis (Conservative)
  - MPP: Bobbi Ann Brady (Independent)
- Time zone: UTC−05:00 (EST)
  - Summer (DST): UTC−04:00 (EDT)

Weathered original Townsend sign, that until recently was located just south of the community.

Townsend is a planned community in Haldimand County, Ontario, Canada, that was founded in 1970 with the expectation it would house the developing industrial region to the south around Nanticoke.

== Summary ==
While there used to be some commercial activity (variety store, hairdressing salon, and other numerous small businesses), the community now consists of almost purely residential and government-use property. The governmental services in the area mainly cover children's issues and mental health issues.

In the 1960s, the Ontario government was concerned about the rapid growth of Toronto. Townsend was conceived by the Government of Ontario to have a population of more than 100,000 people by the year 2000. However, workers moving into the area that became employed at the newly constructed Stelco, Texaco, and Ontario Hydro plants to the south mainly elected to locate to more established communities with commercial centres like Jarvis, Simcoe and beyond. A nursing home was built during the glory days of Townsend in addition to a recreational centre, a church, and a water tower. There were plans for a library and a fire station to be built here, but the plans never came into reality. People in this town go grocery shopping in Hagersville and do most of their shopping for consumer goods in Simcoe.

By 1985, there were no signs of mass migration to Townsend. Had the idea succeeded, Townsend would have been Southwestern Ontario's first "green" city with mass transit, urban-style parks, and a downtown area that combined commercial zones with residential areas. The area farms would have either remained in business or would have become golf courses as the economy improved over time. The parks would have appeared along the riverside. No plans to appease the urban factory shift worker were made; the completed neighbourhood would have looked like a California suburb despite not having the year-round warm climate of Southern California nor the relatively mild winters particularly found in the San Francisco area.

Most people get their television either through Shaw Direct, Bell Satellite TV or over-the-air. There are only three channels (WYNB-DT, CITS-DT and CIII-DT) can be picked up reliably using an outdoor antenna while an additional six channels (CKCO-DT, CHCH-DT, CICO-DT, WICU-DT, CITY-DT, and CHCJ-DT) can be picked up semi-reliably. There are twelve channels that can be picked up over-the-air only during sunny days where clouds are absent.

Townsend is the hometown of 2013 Memorial Cup Champion Jim Midgley.

== See also ==
- Celebration, Florida - a community similar to Townsend that was actually finished
