= Southwold, Ontario =

- Township (lower-tier)
- Township of Southwold
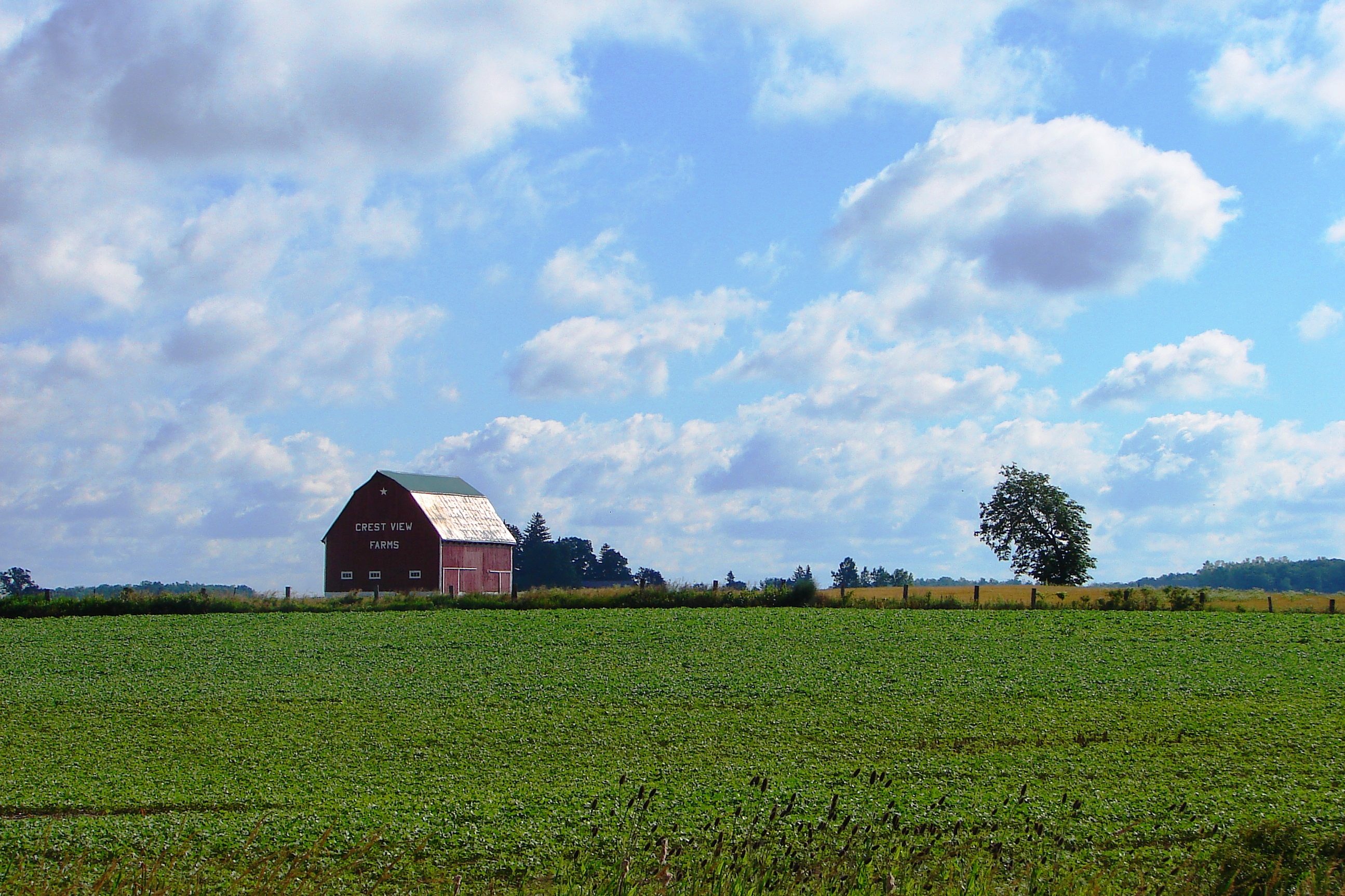

- Location within Southern Ontario
- Coordinates: 42°45′N 81°19′W
- Country: Canada
- Province: Ontario
- County: Elgin
- Incorporated: 1852

Government
  - Mayor: Grant Jones
  - Federal riding: Elgin—St. Thomas—London South
  - Prov. riding: Elgin—Middlesex—London

Area
  - Land: 301.74 km^{2} (116.50 sq mi)

Population (2016)
  - Total: 4,421
  - Density: 14.7/km^{2} (38/sq mi)
- Time zone: UTC-5 (EST)
  - Summer (DST): UTC-4 (EDT)
- Postal Code: N0L
- Area codes: 519, 226, 548
- Website: www.southwold.ca

Southwold is a township in Elgin County, in Ontario, Canada, located on the north shore of Lake Erie. It is a rich agricultural zone producing predominantly corn and soybeans. It is part of the London census metropolitan area.

== History ==
The Southwold Earthworks is located in the township. It is an example of a pre-contact site associated with the indigenous Neutral people. The period of Neutral occupation is dated to approximately 1450–1550. It was designated as a National Historic Site in 1923.

Southwold was named in 1792 after Southwold in Suffolk, England. The municipality was incorporated in 1852.

Shedden's growth occurred when the Canada Southern Railway was built, bypassing Fingal. Later it was joined by the Pere Marquette railway, boosting Shedden's importance further still. Both railways are now defunct. Talbotville is situated at the intersection of highways 3 & 4, two of the oldest roads in the region.

== Economy ==
The township is home to the Green Lane Landfill, a large garbage dump site purchased by the City of Toronto in 2007. Toronto began shipping waste to the site in 2010.

== Communities ==
- Fingal
- Iona
- Iona Station
- Paynes Mills
- Shedden
- Talbotville Royal

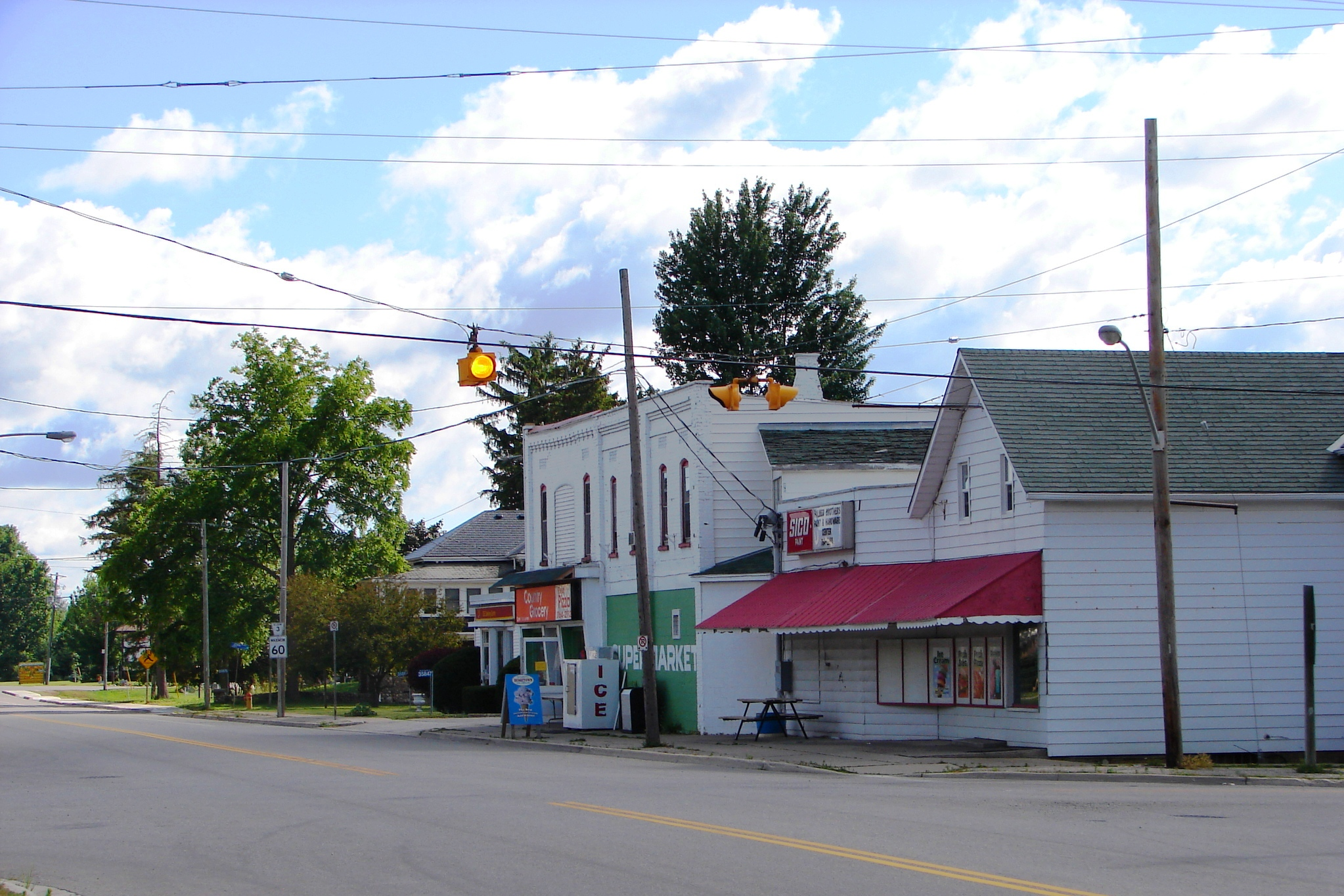
Shedden

== Demographics ==
In the 2021 Census of Population conducted by Statistics Canada, Southwold had a population of 4,851 living in 1,713 of its 1,760 total private dwellings, a change of 9.7% from its 2016 population of 4,421. With a land area of 301.38 km^{2} (116.36 sq mi), it had a population density of 16.1/km^{2} (41.7/sq mi) in 2021.

Canada census – Southwold, Ontario community profile

	2016	2011
Population	4,421 (-1.6% from 2011)	4,494 (-4.9% from 2006)
Land area	301.74 km^{2} (116.50 sq mi)	301.71 km^{2} (116.49 sq mi)
Population density	14.7/km^{2} (38/sq mi)	14.9/km^{2} (39/sq mi)
Median age	44.7 (M: 44.6, F: 44.8)	43.7 (M: 43.2, F: 44.2)
Private dwellings	1,655 (total)	1,643 (total)
Median household income	$83,942

References: 2016 2011

Historical population
Year	Pop.	±%
1991	4,351	—
1996	4,282	−1.6%
2001	4,487	+4.8%
2006	4,724	+5.3%
2011	4,494	−4.9%
2016	4,421	−1.6%
1996 population would have been 4,273 when adjusted to 2001 boundaries

== See also ==
- List of townships in Ontario
