= Courtland, Ontario =

Community in Norfolk County, Ontario, Canada

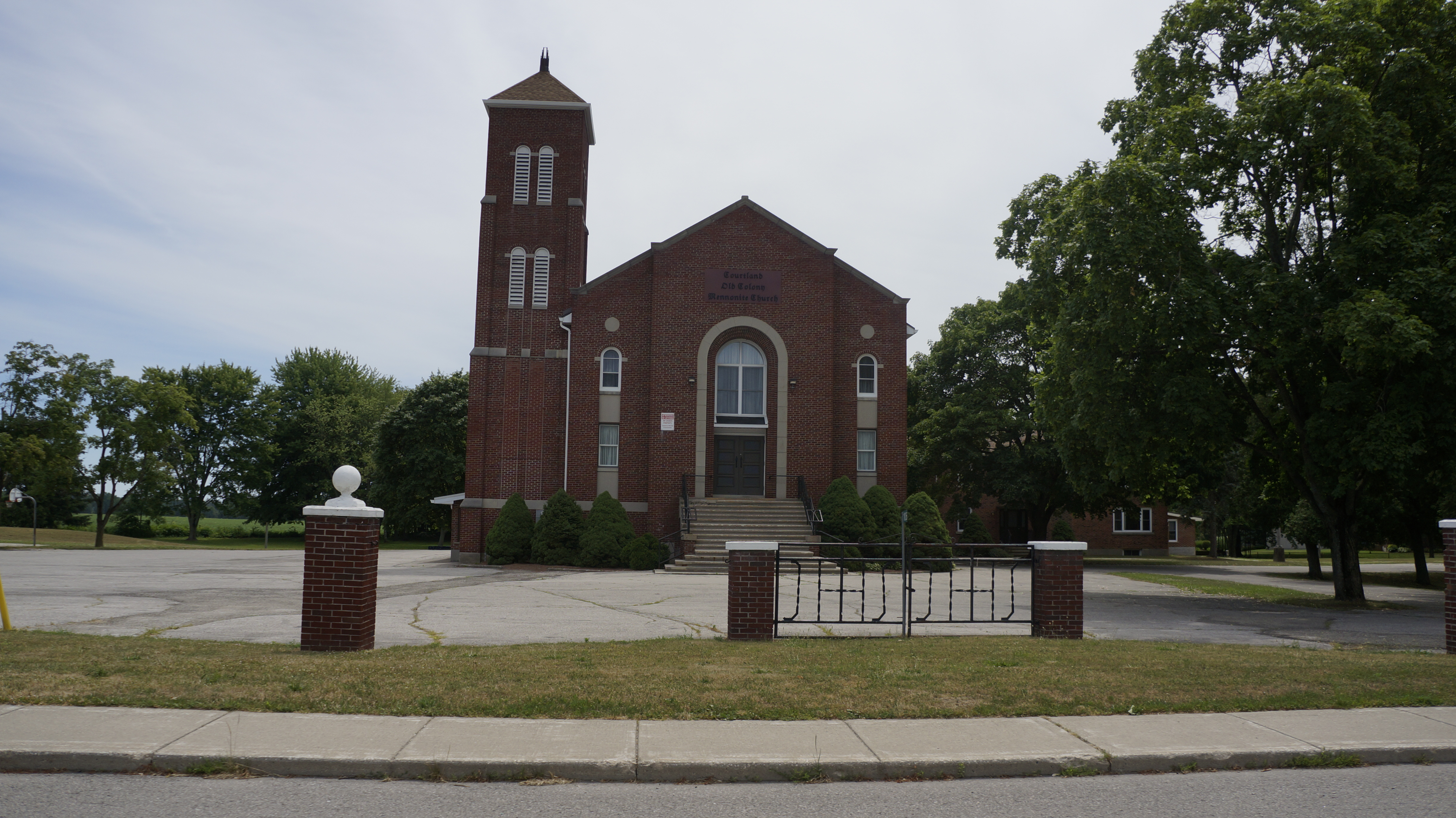
An image of Courtland Church in Ontario

Courtland is a village located in Norfolk County, Ontario, Canada on Highway 3 between Delhi and Tillsonburg.

Sidewalks only exist on the main streets. Otherwise, the walk through Courtland is simple provided that pedestrians pay extra caution to the traffic on the street. Flat terrain exists throughout the entire village; and the village spans approximately 5 kilometres. Recommended activities are hiking, running, and walking. The usage of ATVs, motorcycles, and bicycles are not recommended due to safety concerns. Unlike most communities in Norfolk County, Courtland is entirely accessible for wheelchair users.

== History ==
This community was once known as Middleton; named after the more well-known community of Middleton in Nova Scotia. The first settler was Lot Tisdale who arrived in 1823. 917 people live in Courtland as of 2009.

== Climate ==
Courtland traditionally belongs to the humid continental climate.
