= Malahide, Ontario =

Malahide
- Township (lower-tier)
- Township of Malahide
- Location within Southern Ontario
- Coordinates: 42°47′34″N 80°56′10″W
- Country: Canada
- Province: Ontario
- County: Elgin
- Settled: 1810
- Incorporated: 1998 (current form)

Government
  - Type: Township
  - Mayor: Dominique Giguère
  - Federal riding: Elgin—St. Thomas—London South
  - Prov. riding: Elgin—Middlesex—London

Area
  - Land: 395.05 km^{2} (152.53 sq mi)

Population (2016)
  - Total: 9,292
  - Density: 23.5/km^{2} (61/sq mi)
- Time zone: UTC-5 (EST)
  - Summer (DST): UTC-4 (EDT)
- Postal code span: N0L
- Area codes: 519, 226, 548
- Website: malahide.ca

Malahide (Canada 2016 Census population 9,292) is a municipal township in Elgin County in southwestern Ontario, Canada.

== History ==
Malahide Township was named for Malahide Castle in Malahide, Ireland, birthplace of land grant administrator Colonel Thomas Talbot in 1810. The Village of Springfield was incorporated as a separate municipality in 1878.

The current municipality was formed in 1998 through an amalgamation of the original Township of Malahide, the former Township of South Dorchester and the former Village of Springfield.

The Ontario Police College is located in Malahide, at the site of the former Royal Canadian Air Force Station Aylmer, a training facility.

== Communities ==
The township comprises the communities of Candyville, Crossley-Hunter, Copenhagen, Dunboyne, Fairview, Glencolin, Grovesend, Jaffa, Kingsmill, Lakeview, Little Aylmer, Luton, Lyons, Mile Corner, Mount Salem, Mount Vernon, Ormond Beach, Orwell, Port Bruce, Seville, Springfield, Summers Corners and Waneeta Beach.

== Demographics ==
In the 2021 Census of Population conducted by Statistics Canada, Malahide had a population of 9,308 living in 3,013 of its 3,178 total private dwellings, a change of 0.2% from its 2016 population of 9,292. With a land area of 394.27 km^{2} (152.23 sq mi), it had a population density of 23.6/km^{2} (61.1/sq mi) in 2021.

Canada census – Malahide community profile

| | 2021 | 2016 | 2011 |
| Population | 9,308 (+0.2% from 2016) | 9,292 (+1.6% from 2011) | 9,146 (+3.6% from 2006) |
| Land area | 394.27 km^{2} (152.23 sq mi) | 395.05 km^{2} (152.53 sq mi) | 395.08 km^{2} (152.54 sq mi) |
| Population density | 23.6/km^{2} (61/sq mi) | 23.5/km^{2} (61/sq mi) | 23.2/km^{2} (60/sq mi) |
| Median age | 37.2 (M: 36.8, F: 37.6) | 35.6 (M: 35.8, F: 35.4) | 34.1 (M: 33.8, F: 34.4) |
| Private dwellings | 3,178 (total) 3,013 (occupied) | 3,155 (total) | 3,007 (total) |
| Median household income | $95,000 | $75,591 |

References: 2021 2016 2011

Historical population
| Year | Pop. | ±% |
|---|---|---|
| 1996 | 8,891 | — |
| 2001 | 8,809 | −0.9% |
| 2006 | 8,828 | +0.2% |
| 2011 | 9,146 | +3.6% |
| 2016 | 9,292 | +1.6% |
2001 population would have been 8,777 when adjusted to 2006 boundaries

== See also ==
- List of townships in Ontario
