= Springfield, Ontario =

Unincorporated community in Ontario, Canada

Coordinates: 42.829572°N 80.935890°W

Springfield is an unincorporated community in Ontario, Canada. It is recognized as a designated place by Statistics Canada.

== Demographics ==
In the 2021 Census of Population conducted by Statistics Canada, Springfield had a population of 761 living in 250 of its 255 total private dwellings, a change of -13.3% from its 2016 population of 878. With a land area of 1.92 km^{2} (0.74 sq mi), it had a population density of 396.4/km^{2} (1,026.6/sq mi) in 2021.

== See also ==
- List of communities in Ontario
- List of designated places in Ontario
