= Bayham =

- Municipality (lower-tier)
- Municipality of Bayham
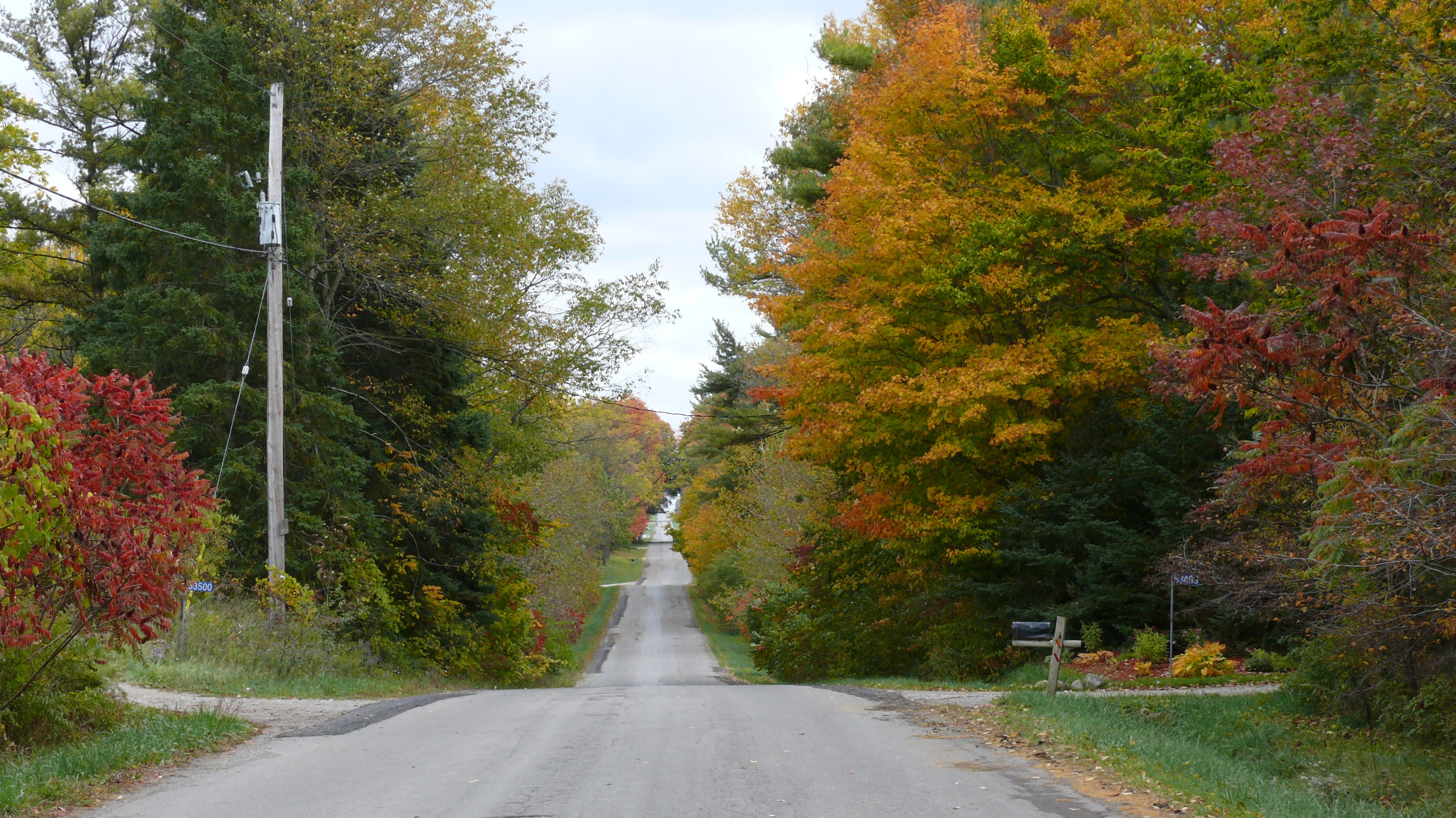
- Motto: Opportunity is Yours
- Location in southern Ontario
- Coordinates: 42°44′N 80°47′W
- Country: Canada
- Province: Ontario
- County: Elgin
- Settled: 1800s
- Incorporated: January 1, 1850

Government
  - Mayor: Edward Ketchabaw
  - Federal riding: Elgin—St. Thomas—London South
  - Prov. riding: Elgin—Middlesex—London

Area
  - Land: 244.97 km^{2} (94.58 sq mi)

Population (2016)
  - Total: 7,396
  - Density: 30.2/km^{2} (78/sq mi)
- Time zone: UTC-5 (EST)
  - Summer (DST): UTC-4 (EDT)
- Postal Code: N0J
- Area codes: 519 and 226
- Website: www.bayham.on.ca

Bayham (2011 Population: 6,989) is a municipality in the southeast corner of Elgin County, Ontario, Canada. It is south of the town of Tillsonburg and Oxford County.

== History ==
Bayham was named in 1810 for Viscount Bayham Charles Pratt, a friend of land grant recipient Colonel Talbot. The township was incorporated on January 1, 1850. The villages of Port Burwell and Vienna were incorporated as separate municipalities and separated from the township in 1949 and 1853 respectively.

In 1998, Bayham was re-amalgamated with Port Burwell and Vienna and Eden to form an expanded Municipality of Bayham.

== Communities ==
The municipality comprises the communities of Corinth, Eden, Froggetts Corners, North Hall, Port Burwell, Richmond, Springer's Hill, Straffordville, and Vienna.

== Demographics ==
Historical population
Year	Pop.	±%
1996	6,234	—
2001	6,375	+2.3%
2006	6,727	+5.5%
2011	6,989	+3.9%
2016	7,396	+5.8%

In the 2021 Census of Population conducted by Statistics Canada, Bayham had a population of 7,096 living in 2,264 of its 2,435 total private dwellings, a change of −4.1% from its 2016 population of 7,396. With a land area of 244.6 km^{2} (94.4 sq mi), it had a population density of 29.0/km^{2} (75.1/sq mi) in 2021.

Canada census – Bayham community profile

	2021	2016	2011
Population	7,096 (-4.1% from 2016)	7,396 (+5.8% from 2011)	6,989 (+3.9% from 2006)
Land area	244.60 km^{2} (94.44 sq mi)	244.97 km^{2} (94.58 sq mi)	245.00 km^{2} (94.60 sq mi)
Population density	29/km^{2} (75/sq mi)	30.2/km^{2} (78/sq mi)	28.5/km^{2} (74/sq mi)
Median age	34.4 (M: 32.8, F: 35.6)	34.3 (M: 34.0, F: 34.6)	35.0 (M: 34.6, F: 35.4)
Private dwellings	2,435 (total) 2,264 (occupied)	2,557 (total)	2,481 (total)
Median household income	$83,000	$65,254

References: 2021 2016 2011

== See also ==
- List of townships in Ontario
