= Central Elgin =

- Municipality (lower-tier)
- Municipality of Central Elgin
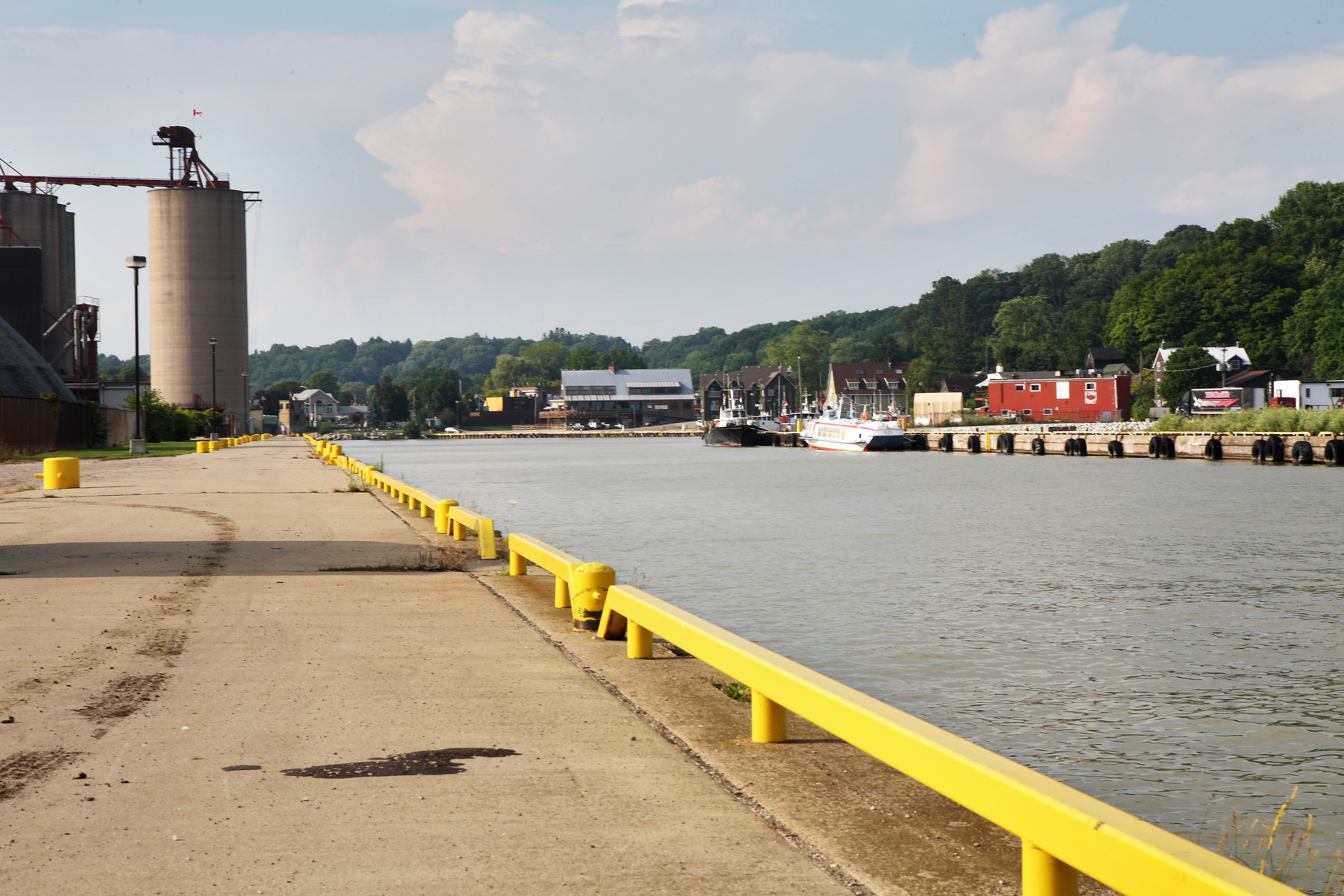
- Harbourfront at Port Stanley

- Flag

- Location in southern Ontario
- Coordinates: 42°46′N 81°06′W
- Country: Canada
- Province: Ontario
- County: Elgin
- Settled: 1822
- Formed: 1998

Government
  - Mayor: Andrew Sloan
  - Federal riding: Elgin—St. Thomas—London South
  - Prov. riding: Elgin—Middlesex—London

Area
  - Land: 280.33 km^{2} (108.24 sq mi)

Population (2011)
  - Total: 12,607
  - Density: 45/km^{2} (120/sq mi)
- Time zone: UTC-5 (EST)
  - Summer (DST): UTC-4 (EDT)
- Postal code span: N0L, N5L
- Area codes: 519 and 226
- Website: www.centralelgin.org

Central Elgin is a municipality located in Southwestern Ontario, Canada in Elgin County on Lake Erie. It is part of the London census metropolitan area.

== History ==
Central Elgin was formed in 1998 through the amalgamation of the Township of Yarmouth with the Villages of Belmont and Port Stanley.

== Communities ==
The municipality includes the population centres of Port Stanley and Belmont. Other communities include Dexter, Lawton's Corners, Lyndale, Lynhurst, Mapleton, New Sarum, Norman, Sparta, Union, Whites and Yarmouth Centre.

== Mayors ==
- Bill Walters, 1999
- David M. Rock, 1999–2006

Born June 16, 1948, in St. Thomas, Ontario. He was also chair of the Elgin Group Police Services Board. While he was mayor, there were discussions about proposed new ferry services on Lake Erie and their financial implications.

- Sylvia Hofhuis, 2006–2010
- Tom Marks, 2010
- Bill Walters, 2010–2014
- David Marr, 2014–2018
- Sally Martyn, 2018–2022
- Andrew Sloan, 2022–

== Demographics ==
In the 2021 Census of Population conducted by Statistics Canada, Central Elgin had a population of 13,746 living in 5,460 of its 5,845 total private dwellings, a change of 9% from its 2016 population of 12,607. With a land area of 279.87 km^{2} (108.06 sq mi), it had a population density of 49.1/km^{2} (127.2/sq mi) in 2021.

Canada census – Central Elgin community profile

	2021	2016	2011
Population	13,746 (+9.0% from 2016)	12,607 (-1.1% from 2011)	12,743 (+0.2% from 2006)
Land area	279.87 km^{2} (108.06 sq mi)	280.33 km^{2} (108.24 sq mi)	280.23 km^{2} (108.20 sq mi)
Population density	49.1/km^{2} (127/sq mi)	45.0/km^{2} (117/sq mi)	45.5/km^{2} (118/sq mi)
Median age	48.8 (M: 48.0, F: 49.6)	47.4 (M: 47.2, F: 47.6)	44.9 (M: 44.7, F: 45.1)
Private dwellings	5,845 (total) 5,460 (occupied)	5,324 (total)	5,174 (total)
Median household income	$103,000	$88,765

References: 2021 2016 2011

Historical population
Year	Pop.	±%
1996	12,156	—
2001	12,360	+1.7%
2006	12,773	+3.3%
2011	12,743	−0.2%
2016	12,607	−1.1%
2001 population would have been 12,293 when adjusted to 2006 boundaries

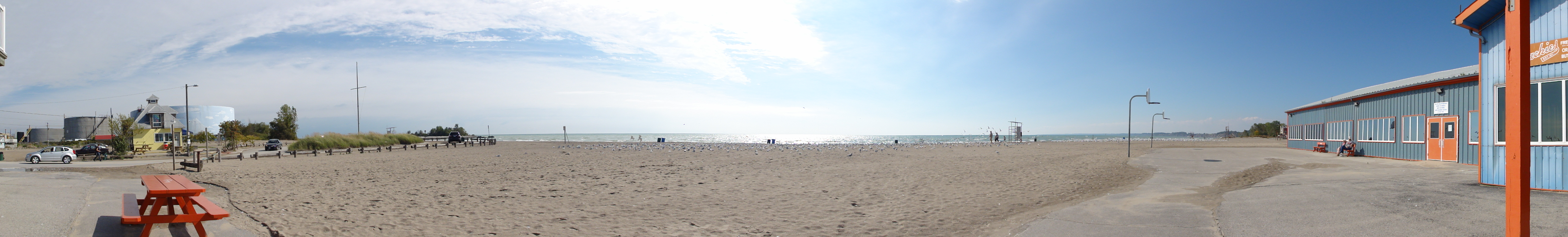
A panorama of Port Stanley beach as seen from a Mackie's restaurant

== Education ==
The community of Sparta has a French-immersion public school. It was an English public school prior to fall 2018.

== See also ==
- List of townships in Ontario
