= Elgin County =

- County (upper-tier)
- County of Elgin
- Logo
- Motto: "Progressive by Nature!"
- Location of Elgin County in Canada
- Coordinates: 42°45′N 81°10′W
- Country: Canada
- Province: Ontario
- Organized: 1851 from Suffolk County
- County seat: St. Thomas
- Municipalities: List: Town of Aylmer; Municipality of Bayham; Municipality of Central Elgin; Municipality of Dutton/Dunwich; Municipality of West Elgin; Township of Malahide; Township of Southwold

Area
  - Land: 1,845.41 km^{2} (712.52 sq mi)

Population (2021)
  - Total: 51,912
- Time zone: UTC-5 (EST)
  - Summer (DST): UTC-4 (EDT)
- Area code: 519 / 226 / 548
- Website: www.elgincounty.ca

Elgin County (/ˈɛlɡɪn/ EL-ghin) is a county composed of seven municipalities in Ontario, Canada with a 2021 population of 51,912. Its population centres are Aylmer, Port Stanley, Belmont, Dutton and West Lorne. The county seat is St. Thomas, which is separated from the county but within its geographic boundary.

== Subdivisions ==
Elgin County is composed of seven incorporated municipalities (in order of population):

- Municipality of Central Elgin
- Township of Malahide
- Town of Aylmer
- Municipality of Bayham
- Municipality of West Elgin
- Township of Southwold
- Municipality of Dutton/Dunwich

The City of St. Thomas is geographically within the boundaries of Elgin County and part of the Elgin census division, but is separated from county administration.

== Historical townships ==
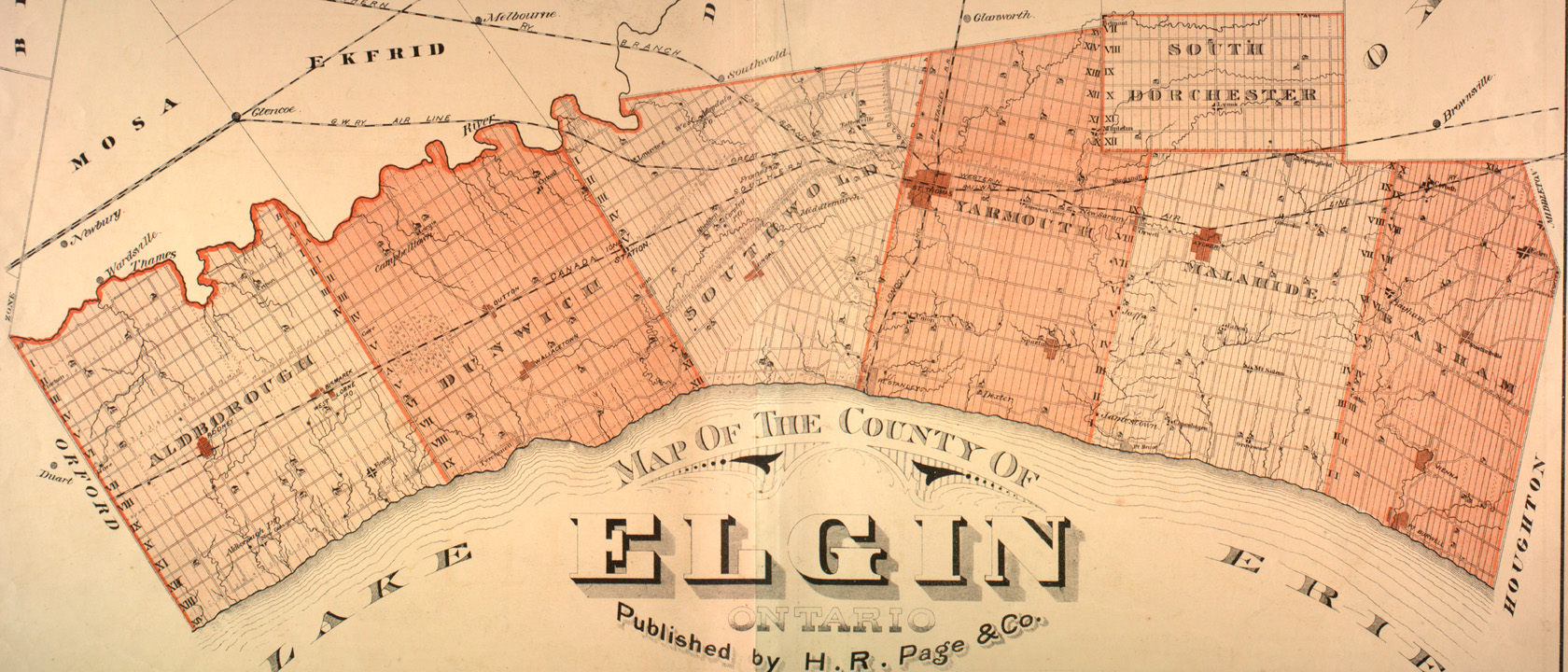
Townships of Elgin County (1877)

Originally Elgin County was once part of Middlesex County, which was reorganized as the United Counties of Middlesex and Elgin in 1851. Elgin was named after Lord Elgin, who was Governor General of Canada at the time.

The County was separated from Middlesex in September 1853.

Historic townships of Elgin County
Township	Area	Description
Aldborough	75,197 acres (117 sq mi; 304 km^{2})	In the early days it had a forest of oak, chestnut and black walnut. It was first settled in 1804.
Bayham	56,350 acres (88 sq mi; 228 km^{2})	Organized in 1810. It was named for Bayham Abbey in Kent.
Dunwich	69,592 acres (109 sq mi; 282 km^{2})	First settled in 1803. During the War of 1812 only twelve families lived in the township. In 1817 a company of Selkirk's Highlander settled in the Township. The Township is named after Dunwich in Suffolk.
Malahide	69,181 acres (108 sq mi; 280 km^{2})	Organized in 1810, named for Malahide Castle in Ireland, the former home of Thomas Talbot, patriot of the region. The Township was first settled in 1810.
South Dorchester	30,560 acres (48 sq mi; 124 km^{2})	Although surveyed in 1798, it was not settled until 1826.
Southwold	72,898 acres (114 sq mi; 295 km^{2})	Opened for settlement in 1797, however the first colonist arrived in 1809. Named for Southwold in Suffolk.
Yarmouth	69,181 acres (108 sq mi; 280 km^{2})	Surveyed in 1792 and settled in 1810.

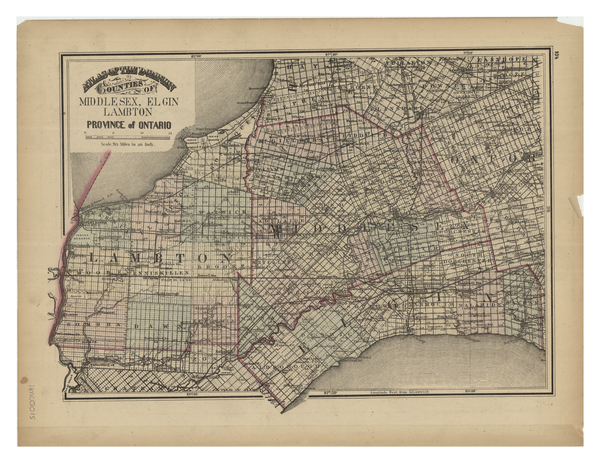
Historical map that includes Elgin County (1875)

== Demographics ==
Elgin County
Year	Pop.	±%
1996	47,752	—
2001	48,250	+1.0%
2006	49,241	+2.1%
2011	49,556	+0.6%
2016	50,069	+1.0%
2021	51,912	+3.7%
2016, 2011, 2006, earlier

As a census division in the 2021 Census of Population conducted by Statistics Canada, Elgin County had a population of 94,752 living in 37,278 of its 38,889 total private dwellings, a change of 6.5% from its 2016 population of 88,978. With a land area of 1,878.57 km^{2} (725.32 sq mi), it had a population density of 50.4/km^{2} (130.6/sq mi) in 2021.

== Notable persons from Elgin County ==
- Horace Harvey - Chief Justice of Alberta
- John Kenneth Galbraith - Canadian/American economist
- Mitchell Hepburn - Premier of Ontario
- Rachel McAdams - Actress
- Joe Thornton - NHL - Professional Hockey Player
- Bo Horvat - NHL - Professional Hockey Player

== See also ==
- List of municipalities in Ontario
- List of Ontario Census Divisions
- Talbot Trail
- Southern Ontario
- List of townships in Ontario
- List of secondary schools in Ontario#Elgin County
