= List of Canadian tornadoes and tornado outbreaks (pre-2000) =

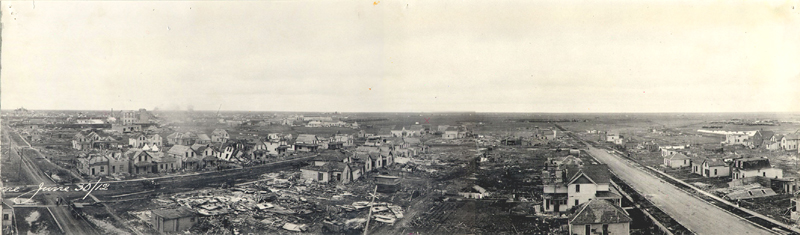
Downtown Regina after the Regina tornado, the deadliest tornado in Canada.

This page lists tornadoes and tornado outbreaks which have touched down in Canada before the year 2000. On average, there are around 80 confirmed and unconfirmed tornadoes that touch down in Canada each year, with most occurring in the southern Canadian Prairies, Southern Ontario and southern Quebec. Canada ranks as the country with the second most tornadoes per year, after the US. The most common types are F0 to F2 in damage intensity level and usually result in minor structural damage to barns, wood fences, roof shingles, chimneys, uprooted or snapped tree limbs and downed power lines. Fewer than 5% of tornadoes in Canada are rated F3 or higher in intensity, where wind speeds are in excess of 225 km/h (140 mph). Prior to April 1, 2013, Canada used a slightly modified Fujita scale, and as of that date the Enhanced Fujita scale, again slightly modified, was put into use to rate tornado intensity, based on the damage to buildings and vegetation.

Each year on average, about 43 tornadoes occur across the Canadian Prairies and about 17 occur across Ontario and Quebec. New Brunswick and the British Columbia Interior are also recognized tornado zones. All other provinces and territories have significantly less threat from tornadoes. The peak season in Canada is through the summer months, (June to August), when clashing air masses move north, as opposed to the spring season in the United States southern-central plains, although tornadoes in Canada have occurred in spring, fall and very rarely winter.

The reported increase in numbers of tornadoes in recent years may reflect more reporting by citizens and media involvement rather than an actual increase in tornado occurrence (although some natural increase has not been ruled out), in addition to better detection technology i.e. Doppler weather radar and satellite imagery. The upswing could also be attributed to other factors, such as improved aerial and ground damage assessment after the fact in sparsely populated areas (particularly the case in remote parts of the Canadian Prairies and Northern Ontario, for example), better trained spotter capabilities and increased use of digital recording devices by citizens. Tornadoes in Canada are enough of a threat for a public warning system to be in place, overseen by the national weather agency, Environment Canada (EC).

For a variety of reasons, such as Canada's lower population density and generally stronger housing construction due to the colder climate, Canadian tornadoes have historically caused fewer fatalities than tornadoes in the United States. The deadliest tornado in Canadian history, the Regina Cyclone of June 30, 1912, killed 28 and injured 300. Urban centres are not immune from the threat of severe tornadoes. Twelve medium to large size Canadian cities have been hit by significant strength tornadoes (F3 or higher), which caused large-scale damage and fatalities: Toronto (1868); Regina (1912); Windsor (1946 and 1974); Sarnia (1953); LaSalle (1956); Sudbury (1970); Woodstock (1979); Lloydminster (1983); Barrie (1985); Edmonton (1987); Aylmer (1994); and Ottawa-Gatineau (1888 and 2018).

All figures for damages are in Canadian dollars.

== Before 1850 ==
1792

- June 30 or July 1 - the first recorded tornado in Canadian history, an F2, affected the Niagara Peninsula between Fonthill and Port Robinson, Ontario. It levelled houses and uprooted many trees. The tornado cut a path of trees in a west to east line from both communities that became known as "Hurricane Road", which still exists today.

1795 or 1798

- ??? - an unrated probable tornado touched down near Port Credit, Ontario.

1796

- ??? - an unrated probable tornado touched down near Caistor, Ontario, passing through the townships of Gainsborough and Pelham.

1823

- August 21 - an unrated tornado touched down near Cornwall, Ontario, and moved southeast into New York before striking Constable, New York.

1826

- August 1 - an unrated tornado crossed Lake St. Clair, moving through Chatham, Ontario, where extensive damage was done.

1828

- June 27 - an unrated tornado struck Eastern Ontario in the area of Drummond Centre, Ontario. The tornado destroyed barns and houses, carrying some far distances. An unroofed brick house was carried off its foundation. A strong stone house was partly destroyed. Trees on the third and fourth concession of Drummond Township were uprooted and damaged.

1829

- Late May - an F0 tornado struck and destroyed the early settlement of Guelph, Ontario. Development on the settlement was slow to begin afterwards with some recalling little progress in the next three years following the tornado.

1831

- June 26 - an unrated tornado struck Montreal, Quebec, carrying the roof off the western tower of the New Catholic Parish Church and depositing on Notre Dame Street. Construction material was tossed around and various houses were destroyed. Damage was also done on Guy Street.

1832

- November 2 - an unrated probable tornado passed through Peterborough, Ontario.

1833

- Summer Months - an unrated probable tornado passed through Peterborough, Ontario.

1834

- June 21 - an unrated tornado passed over parts of Darlington Township, Ontario.

1844

- June 12 - an F2 passed through the community of Holland Landing, Ontario.
- August 7 - an F1 tornado struck Galt, Ontario. The first tornado-related recorded death occurred here when a tree fell onto a man.

1847

- June 12 - an F0 tornado touched down north of Guelph, Ontario.
- August 6 - an unrated tornado touched down "a few miles north of Yonge Street" in Toronto, Ontario.
- September 5 - an F2 tornado and a probable tornado struck Ontario and Quebec. The F2 tornado struck Cornwall, Ontario, and near Lancaster, Ontario. The tornado started near Massena, New York, before crossing the St. Lawrence River. The tornado was spotted crossing the river from Long Sault, Ontario. In Cornwall, Ontario, the tornado did significant damage to structures with the tornado destroying 3 houses, unroofing 8, and damaging another 9 or so. As for out-houses, the tornado destroyed 11, unroofed 13, and damaged many more. Debris was carried up to the three miles away. A young girl was thrown into the Cornwall Canal and drowned, while her brother and another man escaped without injury. The tornado approached the St. Lawrence River near Lancaster, Ontario, where it destroyed several other buildings and injured two. The probable tornado struck Saint-Édouard, Quebec, two hours after the first tornado. The storm lasted 50 minutes which is far longer than a normal tornado, however, the damage caused was the destruction of 57 buildings of various kinds. This tornado is listed as probable as the description is not fully clear on the event but the significant damage caused seems far greater than a downburst.

1848

- June 19 - an F2 tornado struck Ingersoll, Ontario.

1849

- September 26 - an unrated tornado touched down in the northern half of the former municipality of Chinguacousy, Ontario.

== 1850s ==
1850

- July 5 - an F3 tornado touched down over Lake Scugog, spending nearly 12 minutes over the water, before moving south into Cartwright Township, Ontario. Trees were snapped and twisted off while fences were blown down. Hail the size of hen's eggs occurred on the outskirts of the tornado. Into eastern Darlington Township, Ontario, an entire forest was destroyed with hail larger than the previous size. A vast majority of livestock in the area were killed. Significant damage was done to homes and barns, alongside crops. The tornado was half a mile wide and tracked for 14 miles in length. Various people were injured with a range of severity. The towns of Manchester, Ontario, Enniskillen, Ontario, and Haydon, Ontario, suffered greatly.

1851

- July 18 - an F1 tornado touched down north of Wheatley, Ontario, striking the hamlet of Windfall, Ontario.
- August 2 - an F0 tornado struck Hecks Corner, Ontario, near Prescott, Ontario.

1854

- April 25 - two tornadoes touched down in the Golden Horseshoe region of Ontario. The first tornado passed along Dundas Street in Toronto causing F0-strength damage. A second unrated tornado touched down near Niagara-on-the-Lake.
- July 11 - an F0 tornado struck Toronto, Ontario.
- August 1 - an F2 tornado struck Dunnville, Ontario.

1855

- April 18 - four F2 tornadoes touched down in Southern Ontario. The first tornado touched down in Grey County, Ontario, near Meaford, Ontario. The tornado moved eastward through The Blue Mountains, Ontario, before causing extensive damage in Collingwood, Ontario. A second tornado touched down in Port Dalhousie, Ontario. This tornado lifted before dropping again and causing F2-strength damage through Niagara-on-the-Lake, Ontario. Finally, a fourth tornado touched down in Whitby, Ontario, moving through Oshawa, Ontario.

1856

- June 29 - an F3 tornado touched down near Embro, Ontario, around the community of Golspie, Ontario, crossing Highway 59 (Ontario) just north of the northern edge of Woodstock, Ontario, in East Zorra-Tavistock Township, Ontario. The tornado destroyed various trees and chimneys while unroofing, damaging, and destroying numerous houses. The tornado continued to the Paris, Ontario, and Brantford, Ontario, road junction where additional damage was caused. The most severe damage was done in Eastwood, Ontario, which sits just east of the Ontario Highway 401 near Woodstock, Ontario. Two children and adult were killed with eight to ten additional injuries. The track of the tornado was roughly 10 miles long.
- July 21 - an unrated tornado touched down near Brighton, Ontario.
- September 10 - an F1 tornado touched down near Kemptville, Ontario, resulting in some minor tree damage. The tornado continued eastward before striking Mountain, Ontario, and Winchester, Ontario, where trees were damaged, homes were unroofed, and fences were destroyed.

1857

- June 15 - an F0 tornado struck Bell River Station near Windsor, Ontario.
- July 19 - an F0 tornado struck Guelph, Ontario.
- July 31 - an F0 tornado struck Toronto, Ontario.
- August 28 - an unrated tornado passed through Hamilton, Ontario.
- September 5 - an F0 tornado struck Toronto, Ontario.

1858

- June 4 - an F0 tornado struck St. Marys, Ontario, uprooting trees and destroying barns.
- July 21 - an F0 tornado struck Whitby, Ontario.

1859

- August 5 - an unrated tornado struck Charlottetown, Prince Edward Island, destroying trees and property. At least two people drown while a vessel with seven on board capsized. It is unknown if all on board died.
- August 10 - an F0 tornado struck Brockville, Ontario.
- September 11 - an F1 tornado struck Ross Township, Ontario.
- October 24 - an F0 tornado struck Coldwater, Ontario.

== 1860s ==
1860

- May 26 - an F1 tornado touched down near Aurora, Ontario, and passed into Gormley, Ontario. The tornado caused extensive damage. This tornado is likely underrated.
- June 19 - an F0 tornado was observed southeast of Sarnia, Ontario near the hamlet of Osborne. An unconfirmed tornado was also reported near Picton, Ontario.
- July 11 - an F0 downed down near Drumbo, Ontario before passing through South Dumfries Township.
- August 7 - an F0 tornado caused considerable damage in Manvers Township and Ops Township, Ontario.
- August 30 - an F2 tornado struck Cashmere, Ontario.

1861

- May 24 - an unrated tornado touched down north of Brantford, Ontario, before moving southeast to the east of Brantford. The tornado did considerable amounts of damage to fences, barns, and homes in the area. The tornado did not appear more than 60 feet wide. At times, there were two distinct paths of damage in close proximity that would reunite into a single path.
- November 14 - an unrated tornado struck Kingston, Ontario, and Garden Island, Ontario. The tornado unroofed weak buildings, damaged sheds, and destroyed fences.

1862

- May 2 - an F1 tornado struck Lindsay, Ontario. This tornado is likely underrated.
- May 21 - an F1 touched down near Port Dover, Ontario, and moved northeast towards York, Haldimand County, Ontario. This long-tracked tornado may have been multiple tornadoes.
- July 6 - an F0 tornado touched down near Lindsay, Ontario and tracked to Peterborough.
- July 22 - an F1 tornado struck Galt, Ontario.
- July 28 - an F0 tornado passed through Barrie, Ontario, prior to becoming a waterspout over Lake Simcoe.
- August 18 - a waterspout over Burlington Bay moved onshore causing F0-strength damage.

1863

- July 8 - an F0 tornado struck Belleville, Ontario.
- August 24 - an F0 tornado struck Brockville, Ontario, before becoming a waterspout over the St. Lawrence River.

1864

- October 6 - two F0 tornadoes touched down in Ontario. The first tornado touched down near Erin, Ontario, while the second tornado caused damage in Rama, Ontario.

1865

- May 17 - an F0 tornado struck Boston, Ontario
- September 14 - an F0 tornado touched down on the St. Lawrence River near Johnstown, Ontario, prior to moving across Drummond Island, Ontario, and entering New York.

1866

- June 25 - an F2 tornado struck Oil Springs, Ontario.
- July 13 - an F1 tornado touched down near Hornby, Ontario.
- July 22 - an F2 tornado struck Guelph, Ontario.
- September 14 - an F0 tornado touched down near Brampton, Ontario, as a complex of severe thunderstorms passed over Southwestern Ontario. Additional tornadoes may have occurred.

1867

- June 7 - an F0 tornado touched down near Belwood, Ontario.
- July 28 - an F1 tornado touched down north of Woodstock, Ontario.
- August 4 - an unrated tornado touched down near Petrolia, Ontario.
- August 18 - two F0 tornadoes touched down in Ontario. The first tornado touched down near Cumnock, Ontario, while the second tornado caused damage along a path between Smith Township and Otonabee Township.

1868

- March 16 - an F3 tornado struck Toronto, Ontario.
- April 29 - an F2 tornado struck Goderich Township, Ontario, and Stanley Township, Ontario, resulting in vast amount of damage to local properties and one injury. Damage was most notable in Bayfield, Ontario.
- August 12 - an F0 tornado developed over Georgian Bay and split into two vortices. The first vortex moved onto Nottawasaga Island, Ontario, just north of Collingwood, Ontario, while the second vortex made landfall in Collingwood, Ontario.

1869

- June 20 - an unrated tornado touched down near Birr, Ontario.
- July 10 - an F0 tornado passed through Peel Township, Ontario, and Garafraxa Township, Ontario.
- July 20 - two probable tornadoes touched down in British Columbia. The first tornado touched down along the Quesnel River in the valley, near Quesnel, British Columbia. The tornado was strong enough to knock over 18-inch in diameter trees and carry them long distances. A second tornado touched down near Williams Creek, British Columbia, carrying light materials some distance. These two tornadoes are only probable as they do mention smoke and fire with both situations, but if severe thunderstorms did cross a forest fire area and produce a tornado, the vortex could be able to spin up the smoke alongside carry debris and cause damage as described in the articles.
- Weeks before August 21 (on a Sunday) - one strong tornado or two smaller tornadoes touched down in Southwestern Ontario. The source indicates that a tornado started a few miles west of Woodstock, Ontario, and crossed through the city. The tornado caused immense damage, destroying over 740 panes of glass from the Canada Institute building, uprooting trees and levelling barns and sheds in "East Woodstock". The source discusses a second tornado through Middlesex County, Ontario, which may have been the origin for the first tornado. The description of this tornado claims that forests, fences, houses, and everything else were knocked down in the path of the tornado.

== 1870s ==
1870

- June 16 - an unrated probable tornado touched down in the Township of East Nissouri, Ontario.
- June 26 - an F0 tornado struck the townships of Huntingdon, Ontario, and Hungerford, Ontario.
- July 2 - an F0 tornado struck Bobcaygeon, Ontario.
- July 14 - an F0 probable tornado struck West Dumfries, Ontario, between the current day cities of Cambridge, Ontario, and Brantford, Ontario.
- July 16 - an unrated tornado touched down in Montreal, Quebec. It only lasted five minutes and destroyed everything in its path. There was one unconfirmed death.
- July 20 - an F1 tornado touched down in Belwood, Ontario, along a powerful squall line. Additional damage was reported throughout Southwestern Ontario.
- July 21 - an unrated probable tornado passed through Clear Creek, Ontario.
- July 24 - an F1 tornado struck Chatham, Ontario.
- July 26 - an F1 tornado caused extensive damage near St. Marys, Ontario, in the townships of Blanchard, Ontario, Downie, Ontario, and West Nissouri, Ontario.
- August 29 - two F0 tornadoes touched down in Ontario. The first tornado touched down near Mariposa, Ontario while the second tornado touched down near Uxbridge, Ontario.

1871

- May 25 - an F0 tornado touched down near Wardsville, Ontario.
- May 30 - an unrated tornado struck Orangeville, Ontario.
- June 27 - an F0 tornado struck Arnprior, Ontario.
- August 15 - an F0 tornado struck the Stratford, Ontario, approaching from the northwest and exiting to the northeast.

1872

- April 21 - an unrated tornado struck Bluevale, Ontario. The tornado tore up trees, damaged barns, and shifted a house.
- May 27 - an F1 tornado passed through Haldimand County, Ontario, striking the community of Canborough, Ontario.
- July 1 - two F0 tornadoes touched down in Ontario. The first tornado struck Prescott, Ontario. The second tornado struck Hamilton, Ontario.
- July 4 - an F0 probable tornado passed through Minto, Ontario.
- July 12 - an F0 tornado passed through Gloucester Township, Ontario.
- August 1 - an F0 tornado touched down in Fullarton, Ontario, before moving into Blanchard, Ontario.
- Before November 8 - an unrated tornado struck Westmorland County, New Brunswick, destroying houses, fences, and trees.

1873

- May 23 - two tornadoes touched down in Eastern Ontario. The first tornado was a long-tracked F1 tornado which touched down near Lavant, Ontario, and moved east towards Gloucester, Ontario. The second tornado was an F2-strength tornado which passed from Perth, Ontario, to Smiths Falls, Ontario.
- July 10 - an F0 tornado tracked northeast through woodlands in Tuscarora Township, Ontario
- July 14 - an F0 tornado struck Wallacetown, Ontario.

1874

- June 7 - an unrated tornado struck Kemptville, Ontario. The tornado was short-lived and destroyed about $25,000 worth of property. Many buildings were destroyed including barns, sheds, stables, homes, and shops.
- July 16 -- an F0 tornado struck Harriston, Ontario.
- August 7 - an F1 tornado and a probable tornado touched down in Ontario. The F1 tornado touched down near Morven, Ontario, moving east towards Wilton, Ontario. The probable tornado struck Beamsville, Ontario.

1875

- May 8 or 9 - an unrated probable tornado struck Flos Township, Ontario, resulting in tree damaged, blown down fences, and damaged roofs. There is some uncertainty regarding whether or not this was a tornadic event given it mentions significant snowfall during the event.
- June 24 - three tornadoes touched down in Ontario. The first tornado, an F2, struck Belmont Township, Ontario. The second tornado, an F2, struck Bradford, Ontario, demolishing the town hall. The tornado resulted in one death and three injuries. The third tornado was unrated and touched down near Sarnia, Ontario, in Moore Township, Ontario. This tornado resulted in one death.
- July 29 - an unrated tornado struck Saint-Malachie, Quebec, and Saint-Nazaire-de-Dorchester, Quebec, alongside a hail storm which results in hail stones larger than eggs.
- September 3 - an F0 tornado struck Severn Bridge, Ontario.

1876

- April 14 - an unrated tornado Kingston, Ontario, causing significant damage in the city. Many buildings were demolished including a four-story building. Damage was most significant along Princess Street.
- July 25 - an F0 tornado passed through Seneca Township, Ontario.

1877

- July 9 - an unrated tornado struck Galt, Ontario.
- August 15 - an F0 tornado touched down near Gourock, Ontario, just outside of Guelph, Ontario
- August 31 - an unrated tornado touched down near Fort Wayne (Detroit), Michigan, causing damage to fences before crossing the Detroit River and striking the community of Sandwich, Ontario.

1878

- Before May 10 - a probable tornado touched down near Mount Carmel, Ontario.
- May 15 - an unrated tornado struck Centralia, Ontario. The Commercial Hotel was blown down.
- May 20 - three tornadoes touched down in Wellington County, Ontario. An F0 tornado struck Belwood, Ontario while a second F0 tornado struck Salem, Ontario. The third tornado, rated as an F1, struck Fergus, Ontario.
- August 8 - an F2 tornado ripped through Dummer Township, Ontario, near Norwood, Ontario, destroying many properties.
- August 9 - an F1 tornado passed close to Warminster, Ontario, moving into the city of Orillia, Ontario, where barns and homes were unroofed.
- August 16 - an unrated tornado struck Goderich, Ontario, during the morning hours. The tornado twisted the tops of fruit trees, stripped roofs of their shingles, and lofted debris into the air.

1879

- July 3 - an F2 tornado touched down near Paris, Ontario, before striking Harrisburg, Ontario.
- July 11 - an F1 tornado touched down near Thornville, Michigan, before passing through Port Huron, Michigan, and Sarnia, Ontario. The tornado torn apart numerous buildings, filling the air with debris such as roofs, chimneys, and trees. Two people were killed in Michigan. Additional tornadoes may have caused damage in Petrolia, Ontario, and Strathroy, Ontario.
- July 29 - a probable tornado struck Port Burwell, Ontario, destroying trees, fences, and chimneys. Based on the description of the event, this could have been caused by a downburst, however, the article claims a tornado.
- August 6 - an F3 tornado touched down near Bouctouche, New Brunswick.

== 1880s ==
1880

- May 31 - an F3 tornado touched down in Lambton County, Ontario, near Florence, Ontario. The tornado damaged and destroyed a number of homes, barns, and sheds.
- June 2 - an unrated tornado touched down in Canada, specific location unknown. The tornado blew down outhouses, uprooted trees, and killed livestock. Two men were killed.
- June 10 - two tornadoes touched down Wellington County, Ontario. The first tornado, an F1, touched down near Arthur, Ontario, around Rothsay, Ontario. The tornado moved east towards Green Park, Ontario. The second tornado, an F2, touched down near Lebanon, Ontario, and moved east to Salem, Ontario.
- Before June 22 - an unrated tornado touched down around Napanee, Ontario, before moving into Prince Edward County, Ontario. The tornado caused great damage to buildings, fences, and crops.
- September 1 - an F0 tornado struck Minto, Ontario.

1881

- June 27 - an F0 tornado struck St. Catharines, Ontario.
- June 28 - four tornadoes, an unrated, two F1s, and one F2, touched down in Ontario. The first tornado, an F2, touched down near Millbrook, Ontario, killing two and injuring many more. The second tornado, an F1, touched down near Erin, Ontario. The third tornado, an F1, touched down in the western half of Orford Township, Ontario, near Muirkirk, Ontario. The fourth tornado, which was unrated, touched down in Culross Township, Ontario, unroofing a barn.
- Before August 11 - an unrated tornado struck St. Agathe, Manitoba, destroying a home and crops in the area.
- September 1 - an F0 tornado struck Aberfoyle, Ontario.

1882

- June 18 - two F1 tornadoes touched down in Bruce County, Ontario. The first tornado passed from Saugeen, Ontario, to the northeast towards Presqu'ile, Ontario, in Grey County, Ontario. The second tornado touched down a few miles east of Kincardine, Ontario.
- August 21 - an F0 tornado struck Fergus, Ontario.
- September 9 - an F0 tornado did considerable damage to many properties in Newburgh, Ontario.

1883

- May 19 - an F0 tornado struck Goderich, Ontario.
- Before May 25 - an unrated tornado touched down in Colborne Township, Ontario, resulting in torn trees, demolished fences, and damaged barns.
- July 4 - an F1 tornado struck Melville, Ontario.
- Before July 14 - an unrated tornado touched down in Medicine Hat, Alberta resulting in damage.
- July 21 - an F2 tornado touched down near Exeter, Ontario, causing a considerable amount of destruction. Hotels, churches, and houses were ripped apart with many other buildings sustaining roof damage.
- July 27 - three tornadoes touched down in Ontario. The strongest tornado was rated as an F3 and caused a path of considerable damage between Derryville, Ontario and Manilla, Ontario. The two other tornadoes were both rated F0s and touched down in London and Toronto.
- August 1 - an unrated tornado touched down near Cannington, Ontario.
- August 22 - an F0 tornado struck Ottawa, Ontario.
- August 30 - an unrated tornado touched down near Scotia, Ontario and tracked through rural terrain towards Novar, Ontario.

1884

- May 15 - three tornadoes touched down in Ontario. The first tornado was unrated and touched down in Woodstock, Ontario, resulting in structural and tree damage in the southern end of town. The second tornado, an F0, touched down just south of Elora, Ontario, and moved between Speedside, Ontario, and Oustic, Ontario. The tornado destroyed barns, fences, and stables. The third tornado, also an F0, touched down near Goldstone, Ontario, and continued east to Alma, Ontario, and Orton, Ontario. The tornado caused significant damage to many farmsteads. The tornado damaged a church and cemetery in Mapleton, Ontario. This tornado was likely underrated with some documentation listing it as a suspected F4 tornado.
- June 24 - an unrated tornado touched down in Shell River, Manitoba, resulting in considerable damage.
- June 28 - an F0 tornado struck Streetsville, Ontario.
- July 3 - an F0 tornado struck Dorchester, Ontario.
- July 16 - an F0 tornado touched down near Lobo, Ontario, moving eastward towards Melrose, Ontario.
- August 27 - at least one tornado struck between Portage la Prairie, Manitoba, and Winnipeg, Manitoba, resulting in unroofed buildings and crop damage. The first tornado struck Winnipeg causing significant damage to buildings. This tornado may have touched down outside of the city in the rural landscape to the west. The Weekly British Whig states that damage to some of the provincial towns was also severe with heavy crop damage while the Victoria Daily British Colonist states that the damage was in a narrow path with weak crop damage. Because of the difference in the event descriptions and the distance between Portage la Prairie and Winnipeg, it is assumed that there was likely at least one tornado with the possibility of more tornadoes that touched down.
- September 18 - an F0 tornado struck Mono, Ontario.

1885

- Week before May 30 - an unrated small tornado struck north Winnipeg, Manitoba, destroying half a dozen homes and injuring many. The tornado briefly became a waterspout when it crossed the river.
- June 7 - three F0 tornadoes touched down in Ontario. The tornadoes struck the communities of Port Hope, Parkhill and St. Thomas.
- July 12 - an unrated tornado struck Strange, Ontario.
- August 21 - an F0 tornado struck the Muskoka District, Ontario, near Skeleton Lake, Ontario, causing a path of destruction. Trees were uprooted while roofs were lifted off of barns and homes. Two children were killed by falling trees.

1886

- August 5 - an unrated small tornado touched down near Glenvale, Ontario, before moving eastward through Elginburg, Ontario.

1887

- April 1 - a small and probable tornado struck Vancouver Island, specific location unknown. The tornado caused minor tree and telegraph line damage.
- July 16 - an unrated tornado passed through Onondaga, Ontario, south of Ohsweken, Ontario. The tornado demolished fences and uprooted trees before damaging an outbuilding.
- August 23 - an unrated tornado struck London, Ontario, and Ingersoll, Ontario, destroying numerous buildings, a large chimney from a Bell mill, and the roof of a gas works. Significant damage to trees, chimneys, and structures was also reported north of London.

1888

- June 6 - six tornadoes touched down across Eastern Ontario and Southern Quebec. The first tornado, an F3, touched down near Lanark, Ontario, before moving east into Ottawa, Ontario. The tornado levelled fences and barns near Lanark, Ontario, before affecting Rochesterville, Ontario (current day Centretown West, Ottawa) before affecting the Billings Bridge region and Gloucester Township, Ontario. The tornado caused considerable damage to the St. Thomas Roman Catholic Church and many dwellings in the area. At least three people were killed from this tornado. The second tornado, also an F3, touched down near St. Raphaels, Ontario, before moving eastward to St. Lambert, Quebec. The tornado caused significant damage, damaging many homes and injuring some. There are unconfirmed reports of three deaths from this tornado. The third tornado was unrated and touched down near Sainte-Justine-de-Newton, Quebec, prior to moving into Sainte-Marthe, Quebec. The fourth tornado was unrated touched down near La Prairie, Quebec. The third unrated tornado touched down near Eastman, Quebec, and moved into Sherbrooke, Quebec. The six unrated tornado struck Lake Mégantic, Quebec.
- July 11 - six tornadoes touched down in Ontario and Quebec. The first tornado was unrated and touched down near Bombay, New York, and moved towards Rockburn, Quebec. The second tornado was an F2 tornado that touched down near Morrisburg, Ontario, and crossed into Cazaville, Quebec. The third tornado made a brief unrated touchdown near Lancaster, Ontario. This tornado killed one person. The fourth tornado was an F2 tornado that struck Hagersville, Ontario. The fifth tornado was an F2 tornado that touched down in Aylmer, Quebec, and passed into Ottawa, Ontario. The sixth tornado was an unrated tornado near Saint-Esprit, Quebec.
- July 22 - an F0 tornado struck Alliston, Ontario, unroofing several houses and barns and tree damage.
- August 16 - an unrated tornado crossed from South Glengarry, Ontario, into Saint-Zotique, Quebec, and then onto Salaberry-de-Valleyfield. It caused extensive property damage, killing nine people and injuring sixteen. It is considered the fifth deadliest tornado to ever hit Canada.
- August 26 - an F0 tornado struck Waterford, Ontario.

1889

- April 7 - an unrated tornado travelled 50 yards through the Last Mountain Lake (Saskatchewan) area, also known as Long Lake, Saskatchewan. The tornado destroyed many houses and barns.
- May 19 - an unrated tornado struck the camps of Rochester and Dorerty near Antoine Creek, Ontario, resulting in tree damage. Two people were injured with one being taken to the hospital in Mattawa, Ontario.
- July 13 - an F0 tornado struck Mayfield, Ontario in Peel Region.
- July 21 - an unrated tornado passed through Deloraine, Manitoba, with no further information provided.
- August 3 - an unrated tornado struck Lorette, Quebec, and the northern portion of the St. Charles Valley, Quebec, damaging barns, fences, and trees. The tornado was narrow.
- September 9 - an unrated small (and probable) tornado struck the south side of Lulu Island, British Columbia, causing no damage.

== 1890s ==
1890

- June 4 - an F1 tornado struck Elora, Ontario.
- June 7 - an unrated tornado touched down near Souris, Manitoba, overturning some Canadian Pacific Railway cars.
- June 11 - an F0 tornado hit Milton, Ontario, destroying fences and buildings. The tornado was 50 yards wide and extended for two miles across first, second, and third concessions of Esquesing Township.
- July 25 - an F0 tornado struck Millgrove, Ontario, carrying a barn over 100 yards and destroying trees and crops.
- July–August - an unrated tornado struck near the Sandhurst School, north of Oak Lake, Manitoba, in the now Rural Municipality of Sifton. The tornado destroyed a pasture and house.
- August 6 - an unrated tornado stuck Sainte-Anne Parish, New Brunswick, cutting a two-mile swath of damage, destroying thirty-one buildings.
- August 8 - an unrated tornado struck Montreal, Quebec, specifically over Lake Saint-Louis, Quebec, Pointe Claire, Quebec, and Dorval, Quebec. Eight water crafts were damaged with many houses and barns being damaged and destroyed. The tornado damaged Dominion Bridge Company in Lachine, Quebec.
- September 5 - an unrated small tornado struck Victoria, British Columbia. Minor damage to a fence was reported at.

1891

- Before June 23 - an unrated tornado struck St. Andrews, Manitoba, damaging fences, uprooting trees and shattering buildings.
- July 14 - two F0 tornadoes touched down in Wellington County, Ontario. The first tornado passed through Mount Forest, Ontario, whereas the second tornado passed through Elora, Ontario.
- August 9 - three or four tornadoes touched down in Ontario. The first tornado, an F0, touched down near Damascus, Ontario, and moved towards Belwood, Ontario. The second tornado, an F0, struck Hamilton, Ontario. The third tornado touched down north of Waterloo, Ontario. An unconfirmed probable tornado struck Huron County, Ontario, between Holmesville, Ontario, and Clinton, Ontario. The probable tornado unroofed many barns and destroyed a windmill, trees were blown down, and a new constructed house was blown off its foundation.
- September 1 or 8 - an unrated tornado struck Mount Forest, Ontario, coming from the southwest and moving towards the northeast with a funnel. The tornado caused tree damage and destroyed the roofs on one or two buildings. Significant damage was done in the country after it passed through the community.

1892

- April 25 - an unrated tornado struck Onondaga Township, Ontario, destroying everything moveable. Due to the lack of information and the referral of a 'Dakota cyclone', this is only a probable tornado.
- Few days before April 28 (likely April 25) - an unrated tornado struck Belleville, Ontario, causing buildings to be blown into pieces with extensive damage done.
- June 1 - an unrated tornado touched down in the County of Beauce, Quebec, destroying barns, trees, and fences.
- June 12 - an unrated tornado touched down in Port Arthur, Ontario, and Fort William, Ontario, which now makes up the city of Thunder Bay, Ontario. The tornado caused tree damage, destroyed telephone and telegraph wires, and wrecked a new building under construction.
- June 14 - at least two unrated tornadoes touched down in Quebec and Eastern Ontario, however, additional damage was reported which could result in upwards of six additional tornadoes. The first tornado hit Sainte-Rose, Quebec, and Sainte-Thérèse, Quebec. It is listed as the ninth deadliest tornado in Canadian history. Six people were killed and 26 injured. Additional damage was reported in Lachute, Quebec, where the path was nearly a mile wide, however, it is unclear from any sources whether this is the same tornado as the first one or a probable concurrent tornado. The second tornado hit the Township of Templeton, just east of the Gatineau River causing significant tree damage. The tornado was half a mile wide. Further east of both of these tornadoes, significant damage was reported in Acton Vale, Quebec, and Upton, Quebec, with a hundred homes destroyed and four deaths and a third tornado is probable. Five additional areas of significant damage were reported across the region. These damage areas could have been from tornadoes or from strong straight-line winds/downbursts at the result of weaker building structures, however, based on the amount of damage caused, probable tornadoes seem likely. The significant damage was reported in St. Johns, Quebec, where two buildings and a large barn were destroyed, over the Île d'Orléans, Quebec, where various houses and barns were blown down, in Saint-Augustin-de-Desmaures, Quebec (just east of Portneuf, Quebec) where a man died after falling off the roof of a barn they were repairing, over Lac Saint-Jean where heavy damage was also reported, and in Renfrew, Ontario, where a high school and six additional buildings were destroyed, including a home that was tossed more than 100 feet.
- June 17 - an unrated probable tornado touched down on Wolfe Island, Ontario, causing tree damage.
- June 24 - an unrated small tornado touched down in Maidstone, Ontario, uprooting trees and unroofing barns.
- June 29 - an unrated tornado touched down in London, Ontario, destroying barns and orchards.
- July 10 - an unrated tornado touched down in Douglas, Manitoba, killing one and levelling everything in its seven-mile path of destruction. The tornado was 100 yards wide. Cows, horses, and chickens were killed by the dozen.
- July 15 - four or five tornadoes struck Ontario. The first tornado, an F0, struck Creek Bank, Ontario. The second tornado, an F0, struck Midhurst, Ontario. The third tornado, an F0, touched down near Beaverton, Ontario, and moved through Rice Lake, Ontario. A fourth tornado, an F1, moved through Hastings, Ontario. A fifth probable tornado struck Otonabee Township, Ontario, resulting in significant damage to buildings, destroyed crops, and killed livestock.
- July 18 - two unrated tornadoes touched down in Ontario, both causing damage. The first tornado, which is probable, struck Hamilton, Ontario, destroying a pulp mill, killing two, and injuring many. A second tornado struck Beaverton, Ontario, destroying many houses, stables, fences, and crops. A number of buildings were entirely demolished with several people injured.
- July 23 - an unrated tornado struck Howard Township, Ontario, in Kent County, Ontario, destroying barns, telegraph poles, fences, and trees. The tornado caused considerable damage on Howard Road and Talbot Street (present day Ontario Highway 3). Fruit and grain were completely destroyed.
- July 25 - an unrated tornado touched down in Elderslie Township, Ontario, destroying many trees.
- July 27 - an F2 tornado destroyed structures in Wiarton, Ontario.
- July 29 - an F2 tornado passed touched down near Ottawa, Ontario, before moving into Quebec towards Templeton, Quebec. This tornado passed through some the areas affected by the June 14th outbreak.
- August 8 - an unrated tornado struck Manhattan Beach, Ontario, 10 miles (16 km) south of Belleville, Ontario. The tornado caused tree damaged resulting in one fatality.
- August 9 - an unrated tornado and a probable tornado touched down in Southwestern Ontario. The unrated tornado touched down near Princeton, Ontario, before moving towards and just south of Paris, Ontario. The tornado caused damage to telegraph lines and bridges, destroyed crops, and damaged buildings. Notable tree damage was reported throughout Brantford, Ontario, but information is inconclusive to rule if this was part of the tornado or not. A probable tornado touched down in the vicinity of the Region of Waterloo, Ontario, and Oxford County, Ontario.
- August 17 - an unrated tornado touched down in O'Leary, Prince Edward Island, destroying three houses near the railway station and five dwellings and two barns on North Road. One person was killed.
- September 10 - an unrated tornado struck Elginburg, Ontario, near Kingston, Ontario, where the roof off the Methodist church was tossed and several barns were destroyed.
- December 3 - an unrated tornado touched down in Montmorency, Quebec, destroying part of a church. Several barns and dwellings were destroyed.

1893

- April 4 - an unrated tornado struck parts of Lethbridge, Alberta, resulting in damage. The front of a local store collapsed.
- April 13 - a small tornado struck Victoria, British Columbia, from the north. No damage was reported.
- April 13 - an F0 tornado touched down near Gordonville, Ontario.
- April 20 - a probable tornado struck Owen Sound, Ontario, destroying fences, sheds, and outhouses. The tornado unroofed barns and homes. There is a lack of concrete evidence regarding this tornado. The newspaper also discusses significant damage in the vicinity of Mono Road, Ontario, which might be classified as a second probable tornado.
- May 23 - immense destruction was reported across Ontario into Quebec with sources indicating up to seven tornadoes. Various towns were impacted. The first tornado, an F2, touched down near Aurora, Ontario. The tornado destroyed a church steeple and caused significant damage. The second tornado, an F2, touched down near Tilsonburg, Ontario, destroying an oatmeal mill, killing one. The tornado caused significant tree damage along Ontario Highway 19 through to Brantford, Ontario. A third F2 tornado struck Belleville, Ontario. An unrated tornado destroyed circus tents, injuring one and killing one in Perth, Ontario. A fifth tornado, unrated, struck Ottawa, Ontario, destroying the St Jean Baptist School, killing a child and injuring another. Small towers on Bank Street collapsed. Several additional people were killed and injured. A sixth tornado occurred in Montreal, Quebec, where various homes were completely destroyed while others only received minor damage. The tornado lofted debris to Rue Cathcart in the city. A seventh tornado moved between Delhi, Ontario, and Windham Centre, Ontario. Additional damage was reported in Orillia, Ontario, where a man was injured by a falling steeple, however, there was inconclusive evidence to support a tornado classification.
- May 30 - an unrated tornado struck Nottawa, Ontario, removing the roof off a mill.
- July 9 - a waterspout touched down over Lake Saint-Louis, Quebec, near Montreal, Quebec. The tornado resulted in a boat capsizing and a man drowning. From the newspaper article, there is no indication that the waterspout made landfall.
- July 10 - an unrated tornado touched north of Brandon, Manitoba. A dispatcher in Brandon, Manitoba, reported that a cyclone touched down north of the city, demolishing several homes and barns. The storm took a southeast path, striking Douglas, Manitoba, and Carberry, Manitoba. A dispatcher in Douglas reported a cone-shaped cloud reaching the ground. Houses and stables were blown down while machinery was scattered across the farmland in this area. Additional damage was reported in Chater, Manitoba.
- July 28 - an unrated tornado touched down in Hanlee Grove, Prince Edward Island, outside of Charlottetown, Prince Edward Island, cutting a half a mile wide path through the landscape. The tornado destroyed two barracks.
- August 2 - an unrated tornado touched down in Charlottetown, Prince Edward Island, uprooting trees, flattening crops, and destroying the front of the provincial buildings. The tornado levelled the McKinnon's old tannery and other various buildings.

1894

- May 6 - an unrated tornado struck Clinton, Ontario, shattering a few windows with debris.
- May 20 or May 27 - an unrated tornado touched down in Montreal, Quebec. The tornado tore the roofs off several buildings.
- May 20 or May 27 - an unrated tornado touched down in Huron County, Ontario. The tornado caused significant property damage and a considerable number of people died.
- July 9 - a waterspout touched down over Lake Saint-Louis, Quebec, capsizing four yachts. One person drowned.
- September 18 - an unrated tornado struck Clinton, Ontario. A flex mill was partly unroofed and wagons were overturned. Trees were uprooted and buildings were demolished.

1895

- May 4 - a small unrated tornado struck a few miles north of Bagot, Manitoba. The tornado carried parts of a granary half a mile away. A kitchen was also moved off its foundation.
- June 3 - a small unrated tornado struck Brokenhead, Manitoba, tearing the roof off several buildings.
- June 3 - an unrated tornado touched down near Belleville, Ontario, resulting in broken windows and unroofed structures throughout the city. Damage continued into Prince Edward County, Ontario, with damaged structures at Ox Point, Ontario, and at Big Island, Ontario.
- June 4 - an unrated small probable tornado struck Owen Sound, Ontario
- June 8 - an unrated tornado struck portions of Bromley Township, Ontario, destroying several farm buildings.
- June 15 - a small unrated tornado struck Oak Lake shattering some buildings. The source lists Oak Lake from one of the "Eastern Provinces" from British Columbia which could include Oak Lake, Manitoba, Oak Lake, Kenora, Ontario, Oak Lake, Peterborough County, Ontario, Oak Lake, Ontario, or Oak Lake (Nova Scotia). The largest and most likely would be the one in Manitoba (Oak Lake, Manitoba), however, the source is not clear.
- July 26 - an unrated tornado struck St. Clair, Ontario
- August 4 - an unrated tornado struck 3 miles east of Bridgetown, Nova Scotia, causing significant damage near Clarence, Nova Scotia, and Paradise, Nova Scotia. While one of the sources states that the tornado was 3 miles east of Bridgeport, Nova Scotia, the second and more detailed source indicates other communities such as Clarence and Paradise which are significantly closer to Bridgetown compared to Bridgeport. The tornado snapped and uprooted many shade and orchard trees, throwing them credible distances. Windows were shattered, chimneys fell, and fences were levelled. The top story of a barn was torn off and carried for over a mile with pieces of scantling being driven 3 feet into the ground. An additional house, barns, stables, and crops were also destroyed.
- August 17 - an F0 tornado struck Pickering, Ontario.
- September 11 - an F2 tornado touched down in Kingston, Ontario, before crossing the St. Lawrence River and impacting Cape Vincent, New York. The tornado caused immense amounts of damage and killed two people. The probable tornado from September 23 in the Kingston area might actually have been the same tornado as this one. There are some indications that the tornado (or a secondary one) may have touched down further west near McIntyre, Ontario, causing little damage.
- September 23 - a probable tornado touched down in Kingston, Ontario.

1896

- May 25 - an F2 tornado touched down near Windsor, Ontario, in the Sandwich East district, resulting in destroyed houses, barns, machinery, fences, and trees. Many cattle and horses were killed, however, no notable deaths or injuries for humans.
- May 27 - an unrated tornado struck Delhi, Ontario.
- June 6 - a probable cyclone did considerable damage at the French village of Guion, thirty miles up the Ottawa River. A village named "Guion" doesn't exist, but the next closest thing which matches the distance is the closely named Quyon, Quebec. Unless further information is found, it can be assumed that the misspelling was a miscommunication.
- June 25 - a probable tornado touched down in Windsor, Ontario, destroying and lifting off roofs, smashing windows, and damaging trees. Many chimneys were also blown down.
- July 2 - an unrated tornado touched down on Lac Deschênes along the Ottawa River near Ottawa, Ontario. The tornado overturned numerous boats, killing three.
- August 10 - an F0 tornado touched down in Amherstburg, Ontario, lifting the roof from the Lake View house and tossing it across the street. Various boats in the Detroit River were overturned. Significant damage was also reported in Simcoe, Ontario, where the roof from a grand stand was carried around with more minor damage to fences and trees reported. There was also significant crop damage in this area which is more indictive of straight-line winds or a downburst unless new information can be found.
- August 26 - an unrated tornado touched down near Flinton, Ontario. The tornado caused significant damage to homes, barns, and fences. Many trees were destroyed.

1897

- May 31 - an F2 tornado struck Winfield, Ontario, north of Elmira, Ontario.
- June 21 - an unrated tornado struck Nicola, British Columbia, just northeast of Merritt, British Columbia. The tornado snapped trees near Mill Creek which fell in the direction of Driard hotel. There was initial question about the creditability of this report, but further research suggests that a Driard hotel did exist in Nicola with a Mill Creek Road also existing in the area, therefore, the report is classified as valid.
- June 29 - two F1 tornadoes touched down in Ontario. The first tornado struck London, Ontario, in Westminster Township, Ontario, destroying buildings, woods, orchards, and fields. The second tornado struck Paynes Mills, Ontario (present day Kettle Creek). The second tornado lifted a house from its foundation.
- July 2 - an unrated tornado struck Griswold, Manitoba, tossing a house over some trees.
- July 3 - an unrated tornado struck Rapid City, Manitoba, killing one and demolishing several buildings.
- July 5 - an F0 tornado struck Marsville, Ontario.
- July 12 - an unrated tornado struck parts of Chicoutimi County, Quebec.
- Within the week before July 20 - an unrated tornado struck between Lothaire, Alberta and Wheatland, Alberta, resulting in minor tree damage and a damaged barn roof. The lack of information makes this event question whether it was actually a tornado, listed as 'probable' until further evidence is provided.
- July 30 - an F0 tornado struck Elora, Ontario.
- September 16 - an unrated tornado struck Anderdon Township, Ontario, levelling telephone and telegraph lines, uprooting trees, and unroofing barns and homes. Multiple horses were killed during the storm.
- November 9 - an unrated tornado struck Victoria, British Columbia, causing immense damage. The lack of information makes this event question whether it was actually a tornado, listed as 'probable' until further evidence is provided.

1898

- May 19 - an F0 tornado touched down in Binbrook Township, Ontario.
- June 20 - an unrated tornado struck Wolseley, Saskatchewan, destroying a skating and curling rink, a church, several homes and stables. Three Canadian Pacific Railway freight cars were overturned.
- Week before June 30 - an unrated tornado struck the now ghost town of Percy, Assiniboia, which is just northeast of Kisbey, Saskatchewan, killing one. The roof of a house was torn off.
- July 2 - an F0 tornado struck Watford, Ontario.
- July 4 - an unrated tornado struck Lac-aux-Sables, Quebec, northeast of Trois-Rivières, Quebec. The tornado lifted a house into the air.
- Before July 29 - a questionable tornado touched down near Kingsville, Ontario, destroying 800 peach trees. The description of the damage depicts an event more similar to a downburst. Additional information is need to determine the event classification.
- July 31 - an unrated tornado tracked south to north, just west of Regina, Saskatchewan, destroying several telegraph poles.
- August 15 - two or three F0 tornadoes touched down in Ontario. The first tornado touched down just south of Marmora, Ontario. The second tornado struck Derby Township. The third probable tornado, occurring in Sarawak Township, may have been an extension to the second tornado, however, newspaper articles are unclear as whether or not these were two separate events.
- August 16 - an F0 tornado struck Tottenham, Ontario.
- August 17 - an unrated tornado struck Hirsch, Saskatchewan, injuring three people.
- August 23 - an unrated tornado struck Bayfield, Ontario, resulting in downed trees, general destruction to a train, and destroyed awnings.
- September 26 - an F3 tornado hit Merritton, Ontario (now St. Catharines), killing five people and injuring dozens. It left a 72 km (45 mi) path of destruction, ending near Tonawanda (city), New York.

1899

- March 6 - an unrated probable tornado struck Kingston, Ontario, damaging structures.
- May 16 - a probable tornado touched down outside of Windsor, Ontario, damaging telephone lines and trees.
- Before May 27 - an unrated tornado struck Melita, Manitoba, damaging several buildings.
- Before May 29 - an unrated tornado struck Deloraine, Manitoba, moving a residence over fifty feet.
- June 5 - an F0 tornado touched down near Galt, Ontario and lifted near Rockton, Ontario, causing widespread damage.
- June 14 - an F0 tornado struck Caledon, Ontario
- Before June 22 - an unrated tornado struck George Island, Manitoba, in Lake Winnipeg, damaging many buildings.
- July 3 - an F1 tornado struck Lucan, Ontario
- July 12 - an F0 tornado touched down just southeast of Windsor, Ontario
- July 29 - an F1 tornado struck Ameliasburgh, Ontario
- August 19 - an F0 tornado struck Marsville, Ontario
- September 7 - an F1 tornado touched down over Oil City, Ontario, destroying a number of mills and barns. Fences were blown down and trees torn up. Several people were injured by flying debris. A second F1 tornado touched down near St. Thomas, Ontario.

== 1900s ==
1900

- February 3 - an unrated questionable tornado destroyed twenty houses at Lark Harbour, Newfoundland and Labrador. Based on the date of this tornado and terminology used in the 1900s, there is question as to whether this was another weather system or an actual tornado.
- June 5 - an unrated tornado touched down in Winnipeg, Manitoba, killing one and destroying numerous buildings and telephone communications.
- June 7 - an unrated mile-wide tornado touched down near Marquette, Manitoba, destroying homes and barns in its path. In Woodlands, Manitoba, damage was significant.
- July 10 - an unrated tornado touched down south of Manitou, Manitoba, destroying a barn, small house and a stables. Additional buildings were damaged. There were two injuries.
- July 11 - an unrated tornado passed over Prince Edward County, Ontario. At Milford, Ontario, and Waupoos, Ontario, several buildings were demolished while many barns were wrecked at Black Creek, Ontario.
- July 26 - an unrated tornado struck near Lyn, Ontario. No information has been found on the tornado besides a child dying from a lightning strike associated with the parent storm. The lack of information on the actual tornado makes this questionable.
- August 3 - an unrated small tornado touched down four miles south of Qu'Appelle, Saskatchewan, destroying a dwelling. Two horses were killed.
- August 28 - two tornadoes touched down in Saskatchewan. The first tornado almost wiped out the town of Whitewood, Saskatchewan, and did considerable damage in Wapella, Saskatchewan, killing two. A second small tornado touched down in Yellow Grass, Saskatchewan, destroying various buildings in the community. Significant damage was also reported in Manitoba: Souris, Deloraine, Virden, Elkhorn, Oak Lake, Pilot Mound, Treherne, Glenboro, Morden, Thornhill, Margaret and Saskatchewan: Moosomin. Some of this additional damage may have been from one or more tornadoes.
- September 11 - an unrated small tornado struck Londesborough, Ontario.
- November 5 - an unrated probable tornado struck Goderich, Ontario, resulting in some minor structural damage.

1901

- April 25 - an unrated tornado touched down near Rosser, Manitoba, continuing to the northeast near Stony Mountain, Manitoba, and to an area west of Selkirk, Manitoba. Significant damage was reported in Rosser, Manitoba. Despite the destruction, there were no deaths.
- June 22 - severe storms and probable tornadoes passed over Southwestern Ontario resulting in damage. The first tornado, an F2, touched down near Innerkip, Ontario, and continued to an area just north of Drumbo, Ontario, destroying everything in its path. Orchards and crops were destroyed. Additional damage and possible tornadoes were reported in Wingham, Ontario, Wiarton, Ontario, Camilla, Ontario, and Penetanguishene, Ontario.
- July 5 - an F0 tornado passed through Sunshine, Ontario, destroying a new barn, fences, and trees.
- July 15 - two tornadoes touched in Manitoba. The first tornado touched down in the Pleasant Point, Manitoba, area resulting in damage to crops and the fair buildings in Carberry, Manitoba. A second tornado destroyed lumber mills in both Rat Portage, Manitoba, which is now the city of Kenora, Ontario, and Norman, (Kenora) Ontario.
- July 15 - an unrated tornado touched down in Kingsclear Parish, New Brunswick, and New Maryland Parish, New Brunswick, damaging ten barns and uprooted orchards and crops.
- July 19 - an unrated tornado touched down at Bear Creek, Manitoba, near Gladstone, Manitoba. A house was destroyed and debris carried for miles. Several people were injured.
- August 6 - an F2 tornado struck Cornwall, Ontario.
- August 29 - an unrated tornado touched down in Yorkton, Saskatchewan, destroying many roofs, a new brick house, and a stables.

1902

- May 12 - an unrated tornado touched down near Holmesville, Ontario, levelling fences and blowing the roof of a barn.
- May 21 - an unrated tornado touched down in Toronto, Ontario, damaging many trees, telegraph wires, fences, and signs. A church tower was overturned with numerous windows broken. There was at least one injury.
- May 21 - an unrated tornado touched down in the Pleasant Point, Manitoba, and Carberry, Manitoba, region, destroying buildings, trees, and shattering fences. The tornado was three miles in length and three to four hundred feet wide.
- Before July 16 - an unrated tornado touched down in Laval, Quebec, near the Doucet's Landing railway station, destroying ten houses.
- July 17 - an F4 tornado struck Chesterville, Ontario, tracking northeastward. The tornado was fifty to sixty rods wide and tore dwellings and outbuildings into pieces. Several people were killed, at least five, and injured at a farm in the seventh concession of Winchester, Ontario.
- August 3 - an unrated tornado touched down in St. Catharines, Ontario, damaging various fruit farms and buildings. A single source from three days after the event suggests that this tornado hit also hit Fonthill, Ontario, however, based on the description from the previous sources, this is questionable. It would be possible that the damage in Fonthill which is estimated at $25,000 in damages was from a second probable tornado.

1903

- April 30 - an F0 tornado struck Fergus, Ontario.
- May 8 - an unrated tornado touched down between Portage La Prairie, Manitoba, and Douglas, Manitoba.
- May 27 - multiple tornadoes touched down across Southwestern Ontario. The first tornado, an F2, touched down near Monkton, Ontario, before moving through Mornington Township and ending near Tralee, Ontario. The tornado started at the seventh concession and destroyed a silo before destroying a bush and large barn. A house was shifted eight feet of its foundation. A brick school house on 100th concession was completely wrecked with debris thrown over half a mile. There was one serious injury. A second tornado, an F2, touched down near Listowel, Ontario, and continued eastward towards Elora, Ontario, unroofing part of a barn and throwing it 60 yards away. A third tornado, an F1, touched down half a mile south of Amherstburg, Ontario, were a drive-shed, new barn, and dwelling was destroyed. A person was carried several yards but remained uninjured.
- June 18 - an unrated tornado struck the side of Mount Sicker, British Columbia, resulting in tree damage in all directions block railways.
- July 13 - an unrated small probable tornado struck Saskatoon, Saskatchewan, resulting in damage to roof and shed of the Methodist church. The Roman Catholic church was shifted a foot and small shacks were damaged across the area. Based on the description of the event, there is question as to whether this was a tornado or not.
- Before July 20 - an unrated tornado struck Beachburg, Ontario, resulting in damage.
- August 6 - an F1 tornado touched down two miles west of Forest, Ontario, damaging various barns, windmills, and chimneys. Fences were levelled to the ground, windows shattered, and trees and crops destroyed. Damage was also town in the town of Forest, Ontario, and throughout Warwick Township, Ontario. Several people were injured.
- August 11 - an F3 tornado hit Rockland, Ontario.
- November 10 - an unrated tornado struck Arrowhead, British Columbia, listing the Reid & Young store entirely off its foundation and throwing it twenty feet away. The tornado lasted only a couple seconds.

1904

- May 27 - an F1 tornado touched down in Amherstburg, Ontario, resulting in damage to the Lakeview hotel. Tall smokestacks from the Electric Light and Power Company toppled over. The court house was partially wrecked.
- May 28 - an unrated tornado struck the southern portion of Brandon, Manitoba, destroying the fair grounds and some small houses.
- June 10 - an unrated tornado touched down in Carlyle, Saskatchewan, destroying stables, a skating rink, a kitchen and a hotel.
- Before July 14 - an unrated tornado touched down near Brockville, Ontario, unroofing barns and damaging trees.
- July 15 - an unrated tornado passed near Saskatoon, Saskatchewan, cutting a 400 yard wide path through the country side. A stable was smashed and tossed half a mile. Numerous buildings near the stable were also damaged.
- July 19 - an unrated tornado passed between Wolf's Hotel, Ontario, and Walkerville, Ontario. The tornado uprooted trees and destroyed farm buildings.

1905

- July 6 - an F0 tornado touched down near Barrie, Ontario, and in Midhurst, Ontario. The tornado blew over and destroyed several barns. The property of Charles Stewart (premier) was destroyed with the roof of the barn being blown off, the kitchen in the house being torn apart, and trees and fences also being destroyed.
- July 12 - an unrated tornado touched down in Pine Lake, Alberta, southeast of Red Deer, Alberta resulting in considerable damage to stock and farm property. The path could be tracked through the fields and through a forest, peaking at three to four rods wide. A house lost its roof, but buildings on each side were left untouched.
- July 15 - an unrated damaging tornado struck Winnipeg, Manitoba, resulting in four deaths. The tornado tore up chimneys, building frames, and communication lines. Many cattle died and six people were injured.
- September 13 - an unrated tornado struck Bathurst, Ontario, and Armstrong Corners, Ontario. The tornado resulted in significant damage to structures and crops.

1906

- April 5 - an unrated small tornado touched down in Rivers Inlet, British Columbia, destroying a cannery.
- June 8 - at least four unrated probable tornadoes touched down in Ontario. The first probable tornado touched down in Hamilton, Ontario, uprooting trees, damaging roofs, and destroying a sailboat. A second probable tornado started near Rodney, Ontario, where it destroyed the roof of the Binder Hotel before continuing through/near West Lorne, Ontario, Dutton, Ontario, Shedden, Ontario, and Fingal, Ontario, before ending in St. Thomas, Ontario, where a roof of the Michigan Central Railroad was destroyed and nearly all trees on Wellington Street were damaged or destroyed. Damage in some of the nearby towns mentioned before could have been from the outer edges, more in the style of a downburst associated with the thunderstorm, but without proper record keeping as in the modern era, this can all be classified under one tornadic event. A third tornado touched down in Chatham, Ontario, causing significant tree damage across the city. The tower of the Methodist church collapsed, the peak was knocked off the school, skylights were blown out, smokestacks of several local factories were also destroyed. Various houses were destroyed. This tornado likely dissipated before touching down again as the Rodney, Ontario, to St. Thomas, Ontario, tornado. In Sarnia, Ontario, a fourth probable tornado touched down destroying 150 square feet of roofing on a new lumber mill. Numerous trees were destroyed while a house was lifted off its foundation and tossed. Based on the damage reported, the tornado started near the St. Clair River causing damage along Christina Street, Johnston Street, and Queen Street before moving across Wellington Street and causing damage along Davis Street. The tornado began to weaken before causing minor damage on Russell Street. Additional damage was reported in Port Stanley, Ontario, where a ninety-foot elevator tower collapsed and in Niagara Falls, Ontario. There is inconclusive information to determine the classification of the event in Port Stanley, Ontario, and Niagara Falls, Ontario.
- June 14 - an unrated tornado touched down near Balgonie, Saskatchewan, where it tore apart a skating rink and destroyed the roof of a new stables.
- June 30 - an unrated tornado struck Westport, Ontario, destroying barns.
- July 31 - an unrated tornado passed three miles west of Waterloo, Ontario, destroying fences and wheat stacks. Trees and crops were also damaged.
- August 1 - an unrated tornado struck the North Battleford, Saskatchewan, area resulting in a Baptist church blowing off its foundation and a couple of houses being overturned.
- August 15 - an unrated tornado passed between Boucherville, Ontario (two miles south of Stratton, Ontario) and Barwick, Ontario. The north moved north from the United States between Emo, Ontario, and Stratton, Ontario. Damage was done to numerous houses and barns in the region. The path of the tornado was nearly half a mile wide and jumped back and forth across the Rainy River (Minnesota–Ontario). There were numerous injuries.
- October 9 - an unrated tornado struck Ayr, Ontario, damaging trees, chimneys, homes and other buildings. A mill to the west was also damaged.
- October 29 - an unrated tornado touched down in Coutts, Alberta resulting damage near the international border. The tornado tore parts of the walls on the Campbell's blacksmith shop, destroyed chimneys, and blew over the windmill for the Great Northern Railway of Canada.

1907

- May 26 - an F3 tornado touched down near Nixon, Ontario, where much of the town was destroyed. The tornado moved through the countryside before striking Waterford, Ontario. This tornado was locally referred to as "The Nixon Cyclone" in local newspapers.
- June 3 - an unrated tornado touched down in Nixon, Ontario, west of Simcoe, Ontario. The tornado was narrow, destroying only two houses, a grocery store and a structure with a large coal chute. In the country, several barn roofs were torn off of barns and carried a long distance. In some cases, barn walls were also destroyed.
- June 16 - two unrated tornadoes touched down in Manitoba with additional possible tornadic damage in Saskatchewan. The first tornado struck Napinka, Manitoba, resulting in damage to a farm property. A second tornado touched down to the north near Griswold, Manitoba, destroying fences and chimneys. Tents for the Canadian National Railway construction were flattened. A home was lifted up from the ground and shifted. Unclassified wind damage was reported in Yellow Grass, Saskatchewan, dealing a 'cyclonic force.' Buildings were torn to pieces with a small house being lifted up and shifted. Unclassified wind damage, possibly from a tornado, was reported to the north in Newdale, Manitoba. In this town, numerous farm buildings were damaged or destroyed, including stables, a granary, and homes. Shingles were torn off a roof. Many animals died and one person was injured.
- June 24 - an unrated probable tornado touched down near Huntsville, Ontario. The probable tornado tore off a dwelling from a store and the flag pole near the school collapsed. Significant tree damage was reported with trees "thrown in every direction." Based on the description of the event, there is question as to whether this was a tornado or not.
- July 6 - an unrated tornado touched down in the Meridian District, Saskatchewan, destroying the Kimberley school house, several granaries, and nearby fields. The entry in the source lists the closest settlement as Oxbow, Saskatchewan.
- August 8 - an unrated tornado struck Tuxford, Saskatchewan, damaging and shifting the Anglican church, William's hotel and a large barn off their foundations. A hardware store and ice cream parlor were badly damaged. Sidewalks were ripped up.
- August 14 - an unrated tornado touched down 20 miles south of Vermilion, Alberta on the Battle River killing 3 children and destroying a house along with stables and corrals.

1908

- June 8 - an unrated tornado struck Clinton, Ontario, tearing off the flag pole from town hall, lifting the roof off an evaporator and damaging trees. There is some question as to whether this was a tornado or only severe wind gusts.
- June 19 - an unrated tornado touched down in Hamilton, Ontario, damaging many trees and the electric system.
- Before June 24 - an unrated tornado touched down in Niagara Falls, Ontario, flipping a boat.
- July 29 - two unrated tornadoes touched down in Saskatchewan. The first tornado touched down near Fillmore, Saskatchewan, doing considerable damage to the town and surrounding rural land. Various buildings, including a school, were destroyed. A single schoolboy died. A second tornado touched down near Warman, Saskatchewan, resulting in the Anglican church being shifted while the Saskatchewan Trading Company's warehouse was destroyed. Additional damage was reported in Ninga, Manitoba, Dunrea, Manitoba, and Waskada, Manitoba. It is unclear if this additional damage was the result of tornadoes or not.
- August 4 - a long-tracked F2 tornado touched down near Elora, Ontario, and moved northeastward to Reading, Ontario, Tottenham, Ontario, and Bradford, Ontario.
- August 5 - an unrated tornado touched down near Mount Pleasant, Ontario, demolishing numerous barns, unroofing many others, and causing impassable roads from fallen trees.
- August 16 - an unrated tornado struck Goderich, Ontario, uprooting trees and damaging structures.
- October 5 - an unrated small tornado struck Morris, Manitoba, unroofing two buildings, throwing some farm machinery, and relocating livestock. Small trees were also uprooted.
- October 6 - an unrated tornado touched down in Birds Hill, Manitoba, outside of Winnipeg, Manitoba, doing considerable damage. Two or three houses were destroyed and telephone poles torn up.
- Week before October 9 - am unrated small tornado touched down on Wolfe Island, Ontario, causing considerable damage. The tornado shifted several farm structures and demolished at least one.

1909

- April 6 - an unrated tornado struck London, Ontario, causing some minor damage to a chimney. Half a dozen children were injured from a falling chimney.
- April 15 - an unrated small tornado struck near Piche, Saskatchewan, which is now called Bents, Saskatchewan. The tornado lifted half a house and carried it to the next homestead.
- May 13 - an unrated tornado touched down in McKillop Township, Ontario. The tornado caused damage to fences and railway boards.
- July 1 - an unrated tornado near Didsbury, Alberta is shown in a photograph in the archives of the Glenbow Museum.
- July 1 - an unrated tornado struck Carievale, Saskatchewan, and Gainsboro, Saskatchewan, destroying homes and buildings. Farm machinery were twisted, carried over a half a mile, and destroyed. Buildings were torn up and scattered through fields. Eleven families were left homeless, five were killed, and up to 30 people were injured. A post office was destroyed.
- July 4 - an unrated tornado touched down in Gravelbourg, Saskatchewan, north of Assiniboia, Saskatchewan, resulting in one death and significant roof damage to one home. The roof was thrown over 60 yards.
- July 10 - an unrated tornado touched down over the eastern part of Hullett Township, Ontario. The tornado did considerable damage to trees and fences. A silo was blown down. Machinery was overturned.
- July 16 - two unrated tornadoes touched down in Alberta and Saskatchewan. The first was an F3 tornado struck near the settlement of Golden Valley, Alberta, injuring four. Continuing from the first storm, at 10 pm, a second strong tornado caused damage 14 miles north of Wilkie, Saskatchewan, causing one injury. The second tornado completely destroyed a house and carried pieces of it for a quarter of a mile. Hay stacks and farm machinery were tossed. A second house was damaged. The tornado was a quarter of a mile wide.
- July 25 - an unrated tornado touched down near Oak Lake, Manitoba, destroying numerous buildings.

== 1910s ==
1910

- March 5 - an unrated probable tornado struck Winnipeg, Manitoba, causing considerable damage. The probable tornado blew down the walls of a six-story furniture warehouse. There is a lack of detail regarding any other damage to determine if this was a tornado or not.
- June 21 - two unrated tornadoes struck the Canadian Prairies The first tornado struck 60 miles south of Moose Jaw, Saskatchewan, resulting in widespread damage to homes and farms. Three people were killed, including two children, with seven people injured according to The Granum Press and Lethbridge Herald report that three people died. The book, "The Literary History of Saskatchewan," cites another book, "Freeman Wing Searches," stating that it lists all the names of the Euro-Canadians and three Asian men died, implying that more than three deaths occurred. The second tornado struck Gladstone, Manitoba, destroying a skating rink and part of a mill.
- July 3 - an unrated probable tornado struck Davidson, Saskatchewan, destroying some houses, barns, numerous granaries, and other buildings. Some debris was lofted over 100 yards. The description of the event isn't definitive enough to say if this was a tornado or not with confidence.
- July 29 - an unrated tornado struck Beverley, Saskatchewan, destroying the Quon Koy restaurant. A home a mile east of the town was also destroyed.
- July 30 - an unrated probable tornado touched down in London, Ontario, destroying telephone lines west of the city with trees down throughout the region. The lack of information makes this event question whether it was actually a tornado, listed as 'probable' until further evidence is provided.
- September 8 - an unrated tornado touched down in Creston, British Columbia, resulting in significant damage. The length of the tornado was 500 yards with a wide of 30 feet. The tornado dealt damage to homes and business in the community including barns and farm buildings. Large glass panes were destroyed and large timber blocks weighing up to 400 pounds were picked up and thrown 150 yards.
- October 1 - an unrated tornado struck Montreal, Quebec, resulting in damaged businesses and telephone services.

1911

- March 13 - an unrated small tornado touched down near Macleod, Alberta resulting in minor damage.
- March 27 - an unrated small tornado struck St. Catharines, Ontario, damaging trees and fences. The day following the tornado (March 28) included a significant snow storm and blizzard.
- April 15 - an unrated tornado struck Nanaimo, British Columbia, resulting in uprooted trees, downed fences, smashed windows, and torn shingles.
- May 1 - an F0 tornado struck Caledon Lake, Ontario, damaging a barn.
- Before May 11 - an unrated tornado and violent storm occurred between Brandon, Manitoba, and Winnipeg, Manitoba, resulting in damage to telephone communications.
- May 9 - an unrated tornado touched down in Carievale, Saskatchewan, destroying multiple buildings including numerous barns and a kitchen.
- May 24 - an unrated tornado touched down in St. Boniface, Manitoba, tearing trees, overturning barns and sheds, and breaking windows.
- June 10 - an F2 tornado struck Owen Sound, Ontario. The Clinton New Era paper suggests that two tornadoes merged into a single tornado before destroying thousands of windows, lifting many roofs, and destroying many crops in the area.
- June 11 - four F0 tornadoes struck Southwestern Ontario. The first tornado touched down near Metz, Ontario, and moved through Mono Centre, Ontario. The second tornado struck Milverton, Ontario. The third tornado struck Ponsonby, Ontario. The fourth tornado struck Cook's Bay (Ontario).
- June 30 - an unrated tornado touched down near Winnifred, Alberta, destroying various homes and barns.
- July 6 - an unrated tornado struck the village of Algonquin, Ontario, north of Brockville, Ontario, levelling fences, uprooting trees, and destroying a barn roof.
- July 9 - an unrated tornado struck Huronville, Saskatchewan, lifting several houses off their foundation and carrying them for more than a mile. Three people were injured.
- Week before July 10 - an unrated tornado touched down near Strome, Alberta only lasting a few seconds, but smashing a few windows and shifting a couple barns. Damage was minimal.
- July 10 - an unrated probable tornado struck Peterborough, Ontario, damaging trees, wires, and telephone systems. There is a lack of information which makes this tornado questionable.
- July 12 - an unrated tornado struck Wawota, Saskatchewan, lifting a large barn off its foundation, destroying several other barns, and knocking down fences across the area.
- July 24 - an unrated small tornado touched down near Fergus, Ontario, injuring one person.
- August 11 - an unrated large tornado hit near Black Diamond, Alberta destroying some houses and a granary. One woman was badly injured.
- August 20 - an unrated 200 yard wide tornado developed in Southern Saskatchewan before moving into Manitoba and North Dakota. The tornado struck Glen Ewen, Saskatchewan, Elmore, Saskatchewan, Antler, North Dakota, Westhope, North Dakota, and near Souris, North Dakota. Various injuries were reported in both Elmore, Saskatchewan, and through North Dakota, including seven dead.

1912

- June 30 - Canada's deadliest twister hit Regina, Saskatchewan. Known as the Regina Cyclone, it was an F4 tornado that devastated the city. More than 300 people were injured and 28 people killed. The total cost of damage was estimated to be around $4.5 million (nearly $117M in 2019).

1915

- June 25 - an F4 tornado struck near Medicine Hat, Alberta. The business section of Redcliff was also severely damaged, and a freight train was blown off the tracks. The storm killed two people and injured many others.

1917

- July 27 - a tornado struck the Oak Lake, Manitoba, district destroying a barn.

1918

- No date - a tornado touched down near Vermilion, Alberta, destroying a log house. Three children were killed, and one woman was carried 27 m (30 yd).

1919

- November 29 - a tornado touched down in Leamington, Ontario.

== 1920s ==
1920

- July 22 - a violent tornado passed through a large portion of southeastern Saskatchewan, killing four people and injuring over a dozen. The Canadian Red Cross provided relief on behalf of the government to 42 affected families in Alameda, Frobisher, Lampman, Steelman, and Estevan. Grazulis rated it as F5.

1921

- March 19 - a tornado struck Bruce County, Ontario

1922

- June 23 - multiple tornadoes struck Southern Manitoba, killing five people and injuring hundreds. Damage was estimated near $2 million.
- July 21 - a tornado hit near Crystal Springs, Saskatchewan, lifting a house and dropping it in a field nearby.
- August 15 - an F3 tornado touched down near Eastend, Saskatchewan, killing two and injuring four.

1923

- June 24 - a tornado touched down near Hornby, Ontario (present-day Halton Hills). It travelled eastward almost 20 km (12 mi) before dissipating near Cooksville, close to the centre of present-day Mississauga.

1926

- July 12 - a rare tornado touched down in Lac la Hache, British Columbia, destroying farm buildings and knocking down trees.

1927

- June 18 - a tornado picked up a house in Elfros, Saskatchewan, killing one person. The damage path lasted for 11 km (6.8 mi).
- July 8 - a strong tornado struck Vulcan, Alberta, causing significant damage in the town and surrounding area. A curling rink was destroyed, along with a dairy farm and a granary. There were no injuries.
- July 8 - a tornado struck the Rainy Creek area SW of Bentley, Alberta "leaving a trail of damage and destruction" as recorded in the book titled Bentley and District Early History.
- July 8 - a tornado struck the town of Rocky Mountain House, Alberta. Fifty businesses were destroyed or damaged, as were several residences, barns, garages and other structures. Two people were severely injured, but miraculously no one was killed.

1928

- August 27 - a tornado touched down near Claresholm, Alberta resulting in widespread damage to nearby farms and structures. Several animals died in the tornado.

== 1930s ==
1933

- May 23 - a tornado passed a mile south and west of the town of Winkler, Manitoba, late in the afternoon, and was photographed. The accompanying cloudburst resulted in severe flooding in the town lasting into the following day.

1935

- July 1 - a strong F4, possibly F5 tornado struck Benson, Saskatchewan.
- July 6 - an F3 tornado touched down near Smiley, Saskatchewan, leaving a 10 km (6.2 mi) path and killing two people.

1936

- July 6 - a tornado destroyed buildings and tossed farm equipment near Lavoy, Alberta, about 100 km (62 mi) east of Edmonton.

1939

- June 11 - a tornado touched down near Saint-Jean-sur-Richelieu, Quebec, knocking down trees and blowing off roofs.

== 1940s ==
1942

- July 25 - a small tornado was reported in the community of Mentmore, Manitoba, causing damage to buildings and crops.

1944

- July 1 - two tornadoes struck Lebret, Saskatchewan, killing four people.
- August 9 - locally known as the "Kamsack Cyclone", a tornado touched down in Kamsack, Saskatchewan, destroying 400 homes and 100 businesses. Three people were killed and many more injured.

1946

- June 17 - the third deadliest tornado in Canadian history struck the towns of Windsor and Tecumseh, Ontario. Known as the 1946 Windsor–Tecumseh tornado, it was given an F4 rating and killed 17 people. Damage estimates at the time exceeded $9 million.
- June 24 - a tornado touched down in International Falls, Minnesota, then crossed the border and struck Fort Frances, Ontario. It was given an F3 rating. It dissipated near Rainy River, Ontario.
- December 12 - the small community of Exeter, Ontario, north of London, was struck by an F2 tornado.

1948

- March 19 - a tornado struck the Windsor, Ontario, area. This was the earliest tornado in the year for the province until 2016.

1949

- July 19 - the small village of Chénéville, Quebec, was devastated by a tornado which lasted about three minutes.

== 1950s ==
1950

- September 1 - a tornado cut an 80 km (50 mi) path from Rycroft to Eaglesham, Alberta, damaging crops, farm machinery and farm buildings.
- November - a tornado was reported near Regina, Saskatchewan.

1953

- May 21 - an F4 tornado touched down in Sarnia, Ontario, leaving seven people dead, over 40 injured, and 500 homeless. The path was estimated to be over 150 km (93 mi) long through Michigan and Ontario.

1954

- January 30 - a very rare mid-winter tornado touched down near White Point, Nova Scotia.
- July 7 - an F2 tornado hit the town of St. Stephen, New Brunswick, injuring one person.

1955

- April 25 - a tornado touched down near Nanaimo, British Columbia, causing minor damage in the south end of the city.

1956

- May 12 - an F4 tornado hit southern portions of LaSalle, Ontario.

1958

- January 1 - a tornado was spotted near Amaranth, Manitoba.
- April 16 - a tornado hit Watrous, Saskatchewan, destroying a large barn and scattering pigs up to 5 km (3.1 mi) away.

1959

- June 6 - a tornado destroyed a garage in La Salle, Manitoba, yet the car inside the garage was not damaged. The tornado could be seen 15 km (9.3 mi) away in Winnipeg.
- September 9 - a possible tornado touched down near Watson Lake in Yukon, snapping pine trees.

== 1960s ==
1960

- July 18 - a violent cone-shaped tornado was reported to have torn through the Mentmore, Ingelow and Brookdale areas of Manitoba. The twister pushed 59 cars from a Canadian National Railway freight train off their tracks, damaged buildings, flattened crops, snapped power lines, uprooted trees and pushed a garage off its foundation. Damage was estimated at half a million dollars.

1962

- July 1 - a small tornado was observed near Vancouver, British Columbia. This was the third tornado recorded since the weather office opened in 1929.

1963

- June 29 - a large tornado touched down near Spy Hill, Saskatchewan, 260 km (160 mi) northwest of Regina, destroying multiple houses and damaging property. One man was killed when he was sucked out of his house. The tornado travelled 6.4 km (4 mi), and left a 1.6 km (1 mi) wide path of destruction.

1965

- July 6 - A tornado passed within 5 miles of Calgary, Alberta.

1966

- March 7 - an unconfirmed tornado touched down in Ucluelet, British Columbia, causing significant damage. It drove a metal spike through a classroom window into a blackboard.
- May 6 - a tornado ripped through the village of Westport, Ontario damaging homes and farm bulldings, uprooting trees and cutting telephone communications. No one was injured.
- June 10 - a small tornado touched down near Nanton, Alberta, tearing trees and narrowly missing ranch buildings.

1967

- April 17 - a total of four tornadoes, two being F3 in strength, touched down in Southwestern Ontario, causing at least $8.2 million in damage. The first tracked through Huron and Perth counties, flattening barns and homes, and snapping multiple trees and utility poles. The second F3 tracked from St. Jacobs to northwest of Guelph. Two F0 tornadoes were also confirmed and one person was killed.

1968

- April 11 - a weak tornado hit Watson, Saskatchewan, destroying a garage.
- July 20 - a tornado struck La Riviere, Manitoba, destroying several cabins, ripping the roof off the grain elevator, flipping vehicles, and downing many trees. The tornado tracked about 20 miles to northeast of Manitou with a damage path 200 yds wide.

== 1970s ==
1970

- August 20 - an early morning F3 tornado touched down near Sudbury, Ontario, causing extensive damage in the city, as well as in the suburban communities of Lively and Copper Cliff, and the more distant rural community of Field. Lively was the hardest hit, with over 300 homes damaged. The communities were given little warning of bad weather approaching, as the Sudbury Airport did not have radar that detected tornado activity. Over 200 people were injured and six were killed. The damage was estimated at $17 million, and it is listed as the eighth deadliest tornado in Canadian history.

1972

- July 22 - a tornado near Algonquin Provincial Park left a 25 km (16 mi) path, destroying a portage trail and wide swaths of red pine forest and other trees south of Lake Lavieille.
- July 28 - a tornado tore through farmland near Bawlf, Alberta, destroying a two-storey house and several farm buildings. Two people were injured, and one person was injured and died later from the injuries.

1973

- July 5 - a tornado touched down near Kelvington, Saskatchewan.
- July 13 - an F2 tornado touched down in Brighton, Ontario, in the early evening hours. It only lasted 32 seconds, but destroyed the city hall and toppled most maple trees along Main Street. The Presbyterian Church also lost its steeple. Only one person was injured.
- August 27 - Algonquin Provincial Park was hit with another tornado near Lake Manitou, flattening an 11 km (6.8 mi) long path of forest.

1974

- April 3 - Windsor, Ontario, was hit with an F3 tornado, part of the 1974 Super Outbreak. Nine people were killed and 30 were injured, with an estimated $500,000 in damage. It is listed as the sixth deadliest tornado in Canadian history.

1975

- July 24 - a strong tornado hit Saint-Bonaventure, Quebec, approximately 80 km (50 mi) northeast of Montreal, destroying over 100 homes and businesses. Three people were killed, and over forty were hospitalized.

1977

- July 18 - an F4 tornado touched down near St. Malo, Manitoba, destroying houses and barns. Asphalt was peeled off Highway 59 as a result of the strong winds. Three people were killed.

1978

- June 27 - an F2 tore through the city of Masson-Angers, Quebec (today part of Gatineau), damaging 100 homes and injuring 35 people.
- July 30 - an F2 tornado touched down near Yellowknife, Northwest Territories, toppling a tower and then destroying a transmission tower near Rae-Edzo. Some witnesses said that they saw a huge 1.6 km (1 mi) wide wedge coming into town from the west. The tornado caused severe damage to weakly built houses. It was the third recorded tornado in the region since 1960.

1979

- July 10 - a tornado struck the town of Glasnevin, Saskatchewan, killing one person.
- August 7 - three tornadoes struck near the Woodstock, Ontario, area, causing more than $100 million in damage. The biggest were two F4 tornadoes; one starting in Woodstock and travelling southeast for 57 km (35 mi), the other starting in the south of Stratford, tearing a path southeast for 31 km (19 mi). An F0 satellite tornado accompanied the Woodstock tornado for up to 21 km (13 mi). The storms killed two and injured more than 150, while 480 houses were left uninhabitable.
- August 8 - a tornado touched down in Regina, Saskatchewan, causing damage in the northwest end of the city. Two tornadoes were spotted that day, with one reaching F2 status, but this was unconfirmed.

== 1980s ==
=== 1980 ===
- April 6 - an F0 tornado touched down near Altona, Manitoba, 115 km (71 mi) southwest of Winnipeg.
- May 5 - an F1 tornado was confirmed north of Stratford, Ontario, leaving a path of damage 4.1 km (2.5 mi) in length.
- May 23 - two tornadoes touched down; an F0 near Schuler, and an F1 near Hilda, Alberta.
- May 25 - two F1 tornadoes hit near Aden and Cereal, Alberta. An F0 was also confirmed near Hilda.
- May 25 - four tornadoes were confirmed, three being rated as F1 in strength. They hit near the communities of Creelman, Carnduff and Bellegarde, Saskatchewan. The other tornado, an F0, was confirmed near Dubuc. No major damage was reported.
- May 26 - an F0 tornado touched down near Quill Lake, Saskatchewan.
- May 28 - an F0 tornado was confirmed 16 km (9.9 mi) south of Morden, Manitoba.
- May 31 - a late afternoon F0 tornado touched down, leaving a 26 km (16 mi) path of damage from Georgetown to Woodbridge, Ontario. No injuries were reported, but the damage cost was an estimated $900,000.
- June 2 - Environment Canada confirmed an F0 tornado touched down near Grassy Lake, Alberta, causing no damage.
- June 9 - an F0 tornado touched down, leaving a 50 m (160 ft) damage path near Whitby, Ontario. Minimal damage was reported.
- June 11 - Foremost, Alberta was struck by an F1 tornado, causing no damage.
- June 11 - an F0 tornado was confirmed near Estevan, Saskatchewan.
- June 23 - three F1 tornadoes touched down in east central Saskatchewan near the towns of Invermay, Francis and Ebenezer. No major damage was reported.
- July 6 - an F1 tornado touched down near Prince Albert, Saskatchewan.
- July 10 - a late night F1 tornado was confirmed between Fairy Glen, and Gronlid, Saskatchewan, causing no damage.
- July 14 - an F0 tornado touched down near Sylvan Lake, Alberta, 20 km (12 mi) west of Red Deer.
- July 15 - an F0 tornado hit near the town of Wellesley, Ontario, 28 km (17 mi) northwest of Kitchener, leaving a 1.5 km (0.93 mi) path and causing approximately $50,000 in damage. No injuries were reported.
- July 16 - an evening F1 tornado struck the town of LaSalle, Ontario, damaging property along a 6.3 km (3.9 mi) path. No injuries were reported, but the damage cost was an estimated $500,000.
- July 22 - a rare F0 tornado was confirmed, touching down near the town of Roseway, Nova Scotia.
- July 26 - an F0 tornado struck the Pinaymootang First Nation, in Fairford, Manitoba.
- July 28 - North Battleford, Saskatchewan, was hit with an F0 tornado causing no damage.
- July 29 - an F0 tornado touched down near Bowsman, Manitoba, just before midnight. No damage was reported.
- August 8 - an F0 tornado left a 3.2 km (2.0 mi) track near Wheatley, Ontario. No injuries were reported.
- August 8 - an F2 tornado touched down in Le Petit-Aigle, Quebec, injuring one person.
- August 9 - Roberval, Quebec, was hit by a small F0 tornado.
- August 9 - an F0 tornado touched down near Maple Green, New Brunswick.
- August 10 - an F0 tornado was confirmed near Aldersyde, Alberta.
- August 11 - two F0 tornadoes touched down in Southern Ontario, the first confirmed near North Woodslee. The second touched down in Port Dover, leaving an estimated $20,000 of damage along a 2.5 km (1.6 mi) path.
- August 14 - the province was hit with five tornadoes, the largest given an F2 rating and touching down in London. It was on the ground for approximately 3.2 km (2.0 mi) and caused an estimated $100,000 in damage. The other four tornadoes were given F0 ratings and touched down in Eastern Ontario, near the towns of Springfield, Meath, Kirk Cove and Stanleyville.
- August 15 - Prince Edward Island experienced a rare F0 tornado, touching down near Strathgartney and leaving a 4.6 km (2.9 mi) path.
- August 16 - an F0 tornado was confirmed near Northport, Nova Scotia.
- August 25 - an F0 tornado cut a 10.4 km (6.5 mi) path though Neskantaga First Nation in Northern Ontario.
- September 2 - an F2 tornado was one of three confirmed in the province of Ontario, touching down near Jarratt. An F1 also touched down in South Lancaster, and an F0 was confirmed near Houghton Centre.
- September 22 - six tornadoes touched down in Ontario, causing upwards of $750,000 in damage. Two F1 tornadoes were confirmed in Woodbridge and Blenheim, and four F0 tornadoes touched down in Stratford, Primrose, Mariposa and Lakefield. No injuries were reported.
- September 25 - an F2 tornado hit near Teeswater, Ontario, and was on the ground for over 10 km (6.2 mi).
- September 28 - an F0 tornado was confirmed in Cape Traverse, Prince Edward Island.

1980 confirmed tornadoes: AB / SK / MB / ON / QC / NB / NS / PE; 9 / 12 / 4 / 24 / 2 / 1 / 2 / 2	1980 tornado strengths: F0 / F1 / F2 / F3 / F4 / F5; 36 / 16 / 4 / 0 / 0 / 0

=== 1981 ===
- March 30 - two early season tornadoes were confirmed in Southern Ontario. An F1 tornado touched down near Bothwell, and an F0 hit near Hickson. No injuries were reported.
- May 28 - an F0 tornado touched down near Wakaw, Saskatchewan.
- June 3 - Midland, Ontario, was hit with an F0 tornado causing no damage.
- June 4 - an F0 tornado touched down near Melita, Manitoba.
- June 5 - two tornadoes hit the province of Alberta near the towns of Landonville and Clandonald. They were given ratings of F1 and F0, respectively.
- June 6 - an F1 tornado left a 15 km (9.3 mi) path through Haliburton County, Ontario, near the town of Harcourt.
- June 6 - an F1 tornado touched down near Clandonald, Alberta, it was the second tornado in two days.
- June 10 - an F0 tornado was confirmed near the town of Acton, Ontario, and stayed on the ground for 5.6 km (3.5 mi)
- June 16 - two F0 tornadoes touched down near the hamlets of Gallivan, and Delmas, Saskatchewan.
- July 1 - an F0 tornado was confirmed in extreme southeastern part of the province, near the town of Carnduff, Saskatchewan.
- July 3 - an F0 tornado touched down near the former town of Grandview, Manitoba.
- July 8 - a strong F2 tornado touched down in the community of Scotchtown, New Brunswick, causing an estimated C$10,000 in damage. No injuries were reported.
- July 13 - an F1 tornado touched down in West Edmonton, Alberta. No damage or injuries were reported.
- July 14 - an F0 tornado was confirmed near the village of Boyle, Alberta.
- July 14 - an F0 tornado touched down near Govan, Saskatchewan.
- July 14 - an F0 tornado touched down near the unincorporated community of Notre-Dame-de-Lourdes, Manitoba.
- July 15 - a powerful F2 tornado hit outside the hamlet of Rivière Qui Barre, Alberta, 34.6 km (21.5 mi) northwest of Edmonton.
- July 18 - an F0 tornado touched down near Bond Head.
- July 19 - three F0 tornadoes cut across Ontario, one leaving a 9.7 km (6.0 mi) path near Thornhill. The other two touched down near Maple and Arden.
- July 25 - an F0 tornado was confirmed near Sangudo, Alberta.
- July 28 - an F0 tornado touched down in the municipality of Torch River, Saskatchewan, 140 km (87 mi) northeast of Prince Albert.
- July 29 - Regina, Saskatchewan, was hit with a weak F0 tornado.
- August 4 - an F0 tornado was confirmed near Bradford, Ontario, causing no damage.
- August 5 - two tornadoes touch down in Saskatchewan; an F1 near Kronau and an F0 near Aylesbury.
- August 8 - an F0 tornado touched down in Brantford, Ontario.
- August 11 - an F0 tornado caused an estimated $200,000 in damage near Niagara-on-the-Lake, Ontario.
- August 16 - an F0 tornado was confirmed near Pense, Saskatchewan.
- August 17 - an F1 tornado touched down near Hughton, Saskatchewan.
- August 22 - two F0 tornadoes were confirmed near Wadena, Saskatchewan, and Stenen.
- August 30 - an F0 tornado touched down near Plumas, Manitoba.
- September 10 - three tornadoes touched down in Eastern Ontario in the early evening hours. The strongest, an F1, hit near Shannonville, leaving a 12.8 km (8.0 mi) path. The other two were given F0 ratings and touched down on Howe Island, and near Adolphustown.
- September 13 - an F0 tornado was confirmed near Sarnia, Ontario.

1981 confirmed tornadoes: BC / AB / SK / MB / ON / QC / NB; 0 / 7 / 13 / 4 / 16 / 0 / 1	1981 tornado strengths: F0 / F1 / F2 / F3 / F4 / F5; 31 / 8 / 2 / 0 / 0 / 0

=== 1982 ===
- April 14 - an F1 tornado touched down near Adamsville, Quebec.
- April 30 - an F0 tornado was confirmed near Cudworth, Saskatchewan, 85 km (53 mi) northeast of Saskatoon.
- May 7 - an F0 tornado touched down near Coutts, Alberta.
- May 13 - two tornadoes were confirmed in the province of Alberta; an F1 touched down near Mayerthorpe, and an F0 hit near Fort Assiniboine.
- May 28 - an F0 tornado touched down near Dobbinton, Ontario, causing and estimated C$2,000 in damages.
- May 29 - Magnolia, Alberta was hit with an F0 tornado.
- June 2 - an F1 tornado was confirmed near Gainford, Alberta.
- June 2 - an F0 tornado touched down near Prince Albert, Saskatchewan.
- June 5 - an F0 tornado was confirmed in Delisle, Saskatchewan.
- June 6 - Prince Albert, Saskatchewan, was hit with an F0 tornado.
- June 6 - an F1 tornado was confirmed near Entwistle, Alberta.
- June 15 - an F0 touched down near Parkbeg, Saskatchewan.
- June 15 - four tornadoes were confirmed in Southern Ontario, after active weather swept through the province. An F1 hit near Strathroy, and three F0 tornadoes touched down near Chatham, Burford and Port Burwell. The tornado near Burford was on the ground for approximately 11 kilometres (6.8 mi).
- June 22 - an F1 tornado struck Mississauga, Ontario, and an F0 tornado was confirmed near Exeter.
- June 30 - four strong tornadoes ripped through parts of Alberta, with the strongest, an F3, destroying a farm 15 km (9.3 mi) southeast of Rocky Mountain House. It also destroyed a mobile home, injuring one person, and left an estimated C$500,000 in damages. An F2 tornado also struck 24 km (15 mi) north of Viking, and two F1 twisters were confirmed 12 km (7.5 mi) northeast of Lacombe and near Kinsella.
- July 1 - an F1 tornado touched down near Golden Prairie, Saskatchewan.
- July 1 - an F1 tornado was confirmed near Consort, Alberta, causing no damage.
- July 6 - an F0 tornado touched down near Langdon, Alberta.
- July 11 - Clive, Alberta was hit with an F0 tornado.
- July 14 - ten tornadoes were confirmed in Alberta after storms swept through the province. Six tornadoes were given F0 ratings and touched down near the communities of Jackfish Lake, Benalto, Sylvan Lake, Wetaskiwin, Sherwood Park and Vegreville. The other four were given higher F1 ratings and struck near Barrhead, Duffield, Stony Plain, and Lacombe. No injuries were reported.
- July 16 - an F1 tornado was confirmed near Colgate, Saskatchewan.
- July 16 - six tornadoes swept through Manitoba in the evening hours. They were all rated as F0 on the Fujita Scale and touched down near the communities of Emerson, Hadashville, Melita, St. Alphonse and Morden. The sixth was confirmed 32 kilometres (20 mi) southwest of Portage la Prairie.
- July 18 - an F0 tornado touched down near Lucky Lake, Alberta.
- July 18 - an F0 tornado was confirmed near Crows Landing, Ontario.
- July 19 - Bathurst, New Brunswick, was hit with an F1 tornado.
- July 19 - an F1 tornado struck near Carrot River, Saskatchewan.
- July 30 - an F0 tornado was confirmed near Rocky Mountain House, Alberta.
- August 5 - an F0 tornado was confirmed near Carnduff, Saskatchewan.
- August 8 - an F0 tornado hit near Cochrane, Ontario, causing an estimated C$100,000 in damage.
- August 11 - Six tornadoes were confirmed across Alberta and Saskatchewan after an active weather evening. The largest, an F2, touched down near Ponteix, Saskatchewan, and the town of Marshall saw an F1. The four other tornadoes were given an F0 rating and hit near the towns of Alix, Edgerton and Stettler, Alberta, and Prince Albert, Saskatchewan.
- August 14 - an F1 tornado touched down near Denholm, Saskatchewan.
- August 14 - an F0 tornado was confirmed in Decker, Manitoba.
- August 15 - an F0 tornado hit near Vauxhall, Alberta.
- August 15 - an F0 tornado was confirmed near Shamattawa, Manitoba.
- August 17 - an F1 tornado struck near Sylvania, Saskatchewan.
- August 18 - an F1 tornado hit near Hardy, Saskatchewan.
- August 19 - an F0 tornado was confirmed in Mattawa, Ontario.
- August 25 - Two F1 tornadoes were confirmed in Southern Ontario near Mount Brydges and London.
- September 10 - A rare F0 tornado struck near Summerside, Prince Edward Island.
- September 10 - an F1 tornado was confirmed in the city of Calgary, Alberta.

1982 confirmed tornadoes: AB / SK / MB / ON / QC / NB / PE; 30 / 15 / 8 / 12 / 1 / 1 / 1	1982 tornado strengths: F0 / F1 / F2 / F3 / F4 / F5; 42 / 23 / 2 / 1 / 0 / 0

=== 1983 ===
- May 2 - seven tornadoes touched down in Southern Ontario, mainly in Lambton County and Toronto. It caused C$22.2 million in damages and injured 14 people; no fatalities occurred.

- Walpole Island saw an F2 tornado, which injured one person. It lasted 15 km (9.3 mi) on the ground and caused C$1 million in damages.
- Reece's Corners had the strongest tornado, rated an F4. 13 people were injured and many more left homeless. The F4 tornado was on the ground for 30 km (19 mi), and was up to 400 m (1,300 ft) in width. Damages were C$20.0 million, with 15 to 25 buildings destroyed. Winds topped out near 400 km/h (250 mph).
- Kettleby was hit with an F2 tornado that lasted 10.5 km (6.5 mi) on the ground; no major damage or injuries were reported.
- Rexdale, an informally-defined district of Toronto, saw three F0s. They lasted on the ground from 5.87 to 9.93 km (3.65 to 6.17 mi). One caused C$1.2 million in damages. No injuries were reported.

- July 8 - an F3 tornado went through Lloydminster, Alberta and Saskatchewan, causing one million dollars' worth of damage.

=== 1984 ===
- April 27 - an F2 tornado touched down near New Sarepta, Alberta.
- May 12 - an F1 tornado touched down near the town of Whitewood, Saskatchewan.
- May 20 - a brief F0 tornado touched down in the southern outskirts of Spruce Grove, Alberta.
- June 18 - a tornado struck Eastern Ontario near the town of Westport. It severely damaged a small group of buildings.
- June 22 - an F2 tornado struck near Warren, Manitoba. It stayed on the ground for 31.7 km (19.7 mi). Another F1 also struck nearby.
- June 29 - ten tornadoes touched down across Alberta after a stationary front collided with a low pressure system and a cold front. The strongest was an F3 tornado that touched down near Athabasca, destroying granaries and farm equipment. One person suffered serious injuries. An F2 also touched down north of Westlock. Seven F1s touched down in or near the towns of Rocky Rapids, Stony Plain, Wabamun, Busby, Abee, Foremost, and Minburn. Two F0s were also spotted near Lesser Slave Lake and Baptiste Lake.
- July 8 - an F3 tornado was confirmed near the towns of St. Claude and Rosenort, Manitoba, just east of Winnipeg.
- July 15 - tornadoes touched down in the Pontiac and Gatineau, Quebec, regions, including an F3 north of Pembroke, Ontario, that killed one person and caused $2 million in damages. Many buildings were damaged, and cottages completely destroyed. 38 people were injured by flying debris.
- August 14 - an F1 tornado hit the north part of Toronto, Ontario, causing millions in damage.
- September 2 - six confirmed tornadoes touched down in Ontario, known as the Southwest Ontario Tornado Outbreak of 1984. Most were near the city of London. 30 people were injured.

=== 1985 ===
- May 20 - an F0 tornado touched down near St Raphael de Bellechasse, Quebec.
- May 31 - an F4 tornado hit Barrie, Ontario, becoming known as the 1985 Barrie tornado. It was part of the bigger 1985 United States–Canada tornado outbreak. There were 14 confirmed tornado touchdowns in the province. Twelve people were killed, eight in Barrie alone, and hundreds were injured. The tornado destroyed more than 300 buildings and damaged another 100, leaving 800 homeless. The cost was estimated at over $100 million. Another four people were killed by a second F4 tornado that struck close to Grand Valley, Orangeville and Tottenham. That tornado had a touchdown path length of over 100 km (62 mi). Another confirmed F0 tornado hit the Leamington area, as part of the outbreak.
- June 18 - an F3 tornado was confirmed in the town of Saint-Sylvère, Quebec, causing extensive damage and injuring three people. One house was destroyed, and six other buildings were damaged.
- June 23 - An F1 tornado struck north of Vegreville, Alberta.
- June 28 - an F1 tornado caused $40,000 worth of damages in Cochrane, Alberta.
- July 6 - an F1 tornado hit the Quebec communities of Lacolle and Hemmingford.
- July 7 - an F1 tornado hit the Meadowvale area of Mississauga, Ontario, injuring 10 and causing $400,000 damage.
- July 22 - an F2 tornado hit the town of Picture Butte, Alberta
- September 7 - a tornado touched down near Big Rideau Lake, Ontario. The storm killed one person when it overturned a houseboat cruising on the lake.
- October 4 - a weak tornado touched down in Wheatley, Ontario.

=== 1986 ===
- June 1 - three tornadoes touched down in Saskatoon, Saskatchewan. There were no official ratings given for the tornadoes, although some damage indicated F3 strength winds. Roofs were thrown off houses and a warehouse was destroyed. No one was injured, and damage was estimated at over $1 million.
- June 16 - severe storms produced an F3 tornado that travelled from Brady Lake to Maynooth, Ontario. Two other tornadoes were also reported.
- June 16 - an F3 tornado was confirmed near Lac Gareau, Quebec. It severely damaged summer chalets and overturned a truck. Two other tornadoes were reported further east. This was from the same weather system that had affected Ontario earlier in the day.
- June 18 - two tornadoes touched down near High Prairie, Alberta, tossing farm equipment and tearing the roof off a house. A third tornado, an F2, grazed the outskirts of Provost, causing $100,000 in damages.
- June 24 - a tornado touched down in Tingwick, Quebec, damaging 12 properties.
- June 25 - an F1 tornado touched down southeast of Wainwright, Alberta.
- June 30 - one tornado touched down near Stirling, Alberta near Lethbridge, and another tore through Cayley, 60 km (37 mi) south of Calgary. They destroyed a storage shed, tossed a van across the yard, and hurled a large horse against a barbed wire fence. No injuries were reported.
- July 9 - three tornadoes briefly touched down throughout Central Alberta. Two were spotted near Penhold and one reported south of Sylvan Lake.
- July 13 - an F0 tornado hit the northeastern limits of Cochrane, Alberta.
- July 15 - one person was killed from an F0 tornado near Maniwaki, Quebec.
- July 29 - four tornadoes touched down in central Saskatchewan, causing minimal damage.

=== 1987 ===
- May 28 - an F0 tornado struck the community of Glen-Sutton, Quebec.
- June 8 - an F1 tornado was confirmed near the town of Fort-Coulonge, Quebec, causing minor damage.
- July 22 - an F1 tornado was confirmed in Foam Lake Ontario. It was the only known tornado in Ontario that year.
- June 25 - eight tornadoes were confirmed in Alberta after storms tore through the province. The strongest was an F2 near Milo. Six F1s touched down near Springbank, Ghost Pine Creek, Esther, Bow Island, Jalna, and in the town of Lacombe. An F0 also touched down near Eckville.
- July 26 - an F1 twister was confirmed near the town of Kinnear's Mills, Quebec.
- July 29 - an F1 tornado struck north of Grande Cache, Alberta. It was on the ground for 5.64 km (3.51 mi) and had a max width of 310 meters.
- July 30 - an F1 tornado touched down in the Castle Downs neighborhood in Edmonton, Alberta, one day before a devastating F4 damaged or destroyed hundreds of buildings on the east side of the city. A second F1 also touched down in the town of Nisku.
- July 31 - one of Canada's deadliest tornadoes, an F4, ripped through the eastern part of Edmonton, and parts of neighbouring Leduc County and Strathcona County. Known as the Edmonton tornado, it left 27 dead and 253 injured. It was the second deadliest tornado in Canadian history. Environment Canada has been under scrutiny in recent years as to whether or not the Edmonton Tornado should've been rated F5 or not. Seven other tornadoes were also confirmed around in the Edmonton Area and Central Alberta on the same day; a F1 in southeast Edmonton, F2 near Beaumont, and an F2 between Millet and Vegreville that caused $40,000 in damages. The last four were given an F0 rating.

=== 1988 ===
- May 1 - a weak unconfirmed tornado grazed eastern Vancouver, British Columbia.
- June 5 - eight tornadoes touched down around Alberta as storms tore through the province. Two F0s touched down south of Mundare and southeast of Elkwater. Five F1s were confirmed east of Okotoks, north of Tofield, between Olds and Didsbury, south of Ryley, and south of Clive. The strongest of the day, an early-morning F2, also touched down near the Saddle Lake Reserve.
- June 10 - an F1 tornado touched down north of Vermilion, Alberta.
- June 29 - an F2 tornado hit the eastern part of Cardston, Alberta.
- July 14 - an F1 tornado hit the town of Athabasca, Alberta.
- August 29 - a brief F1 tornado touched down near Fort Vermilion, Alberta.

=== 1989 ===
- June 19 - eight tornadoes touched down over central Saskatchewan, with winds gusting up to 130 km/h (81 mph). Hail also shredded crops near Blaine Lake.
- June 27 - an F1 tornado hit the north side of Edmonton, Alberta.
- July 8 - an F2 tornado hit areas northeast of Weyburn, Saskatchewan.
- June 15 - an F1 tornado touched down near Nordegg, Alberta.
- July 27 - a series of severe thunderstorms spawned an F1 tornado in the east end of Edmonton, Alberta. The tornado injured two people, and damaged buildings and uprooted trees and power lines. It caused $500,000 in damages.
- June 30 - a tornado touched down over west-central Saskatchewan, causing damage from Cut Knife to Glaslyn.
- August 2 - an F1 tornado touched down just northeast of Pigeon Lake, Alberta.
- August 14 - three tornadoes touched down in the province of New Brunswick. One hit the town of Carlisle, where trees were uprooted and a barn was destroyed. 22 out of 24 glass storm windows stored inside the barn were left undamaged.
- November 16 - an F2 tornado caused $2 million in damage in the community of Mont-Saint-Hilaire, Quebec. This tornado was part of the November 1989 Tornado Outbreak.

== 1990s ==
=== 1990 ===
- June 28 - a large tornado touched down south of Saskatoon, Saskatchewan.
- August 28 - Southern Ontario was hit by three tornadoes, in an outbreak associated with the 1990 Plainfield tornado. The strongest was an F3, which hit near the Port Stanley area, destroying 10 homes in Frome, and barns near St. Thomas and Delaware, killing several horses. An F2 tornado also struck Komoka, near London, destroying a church. An F1 tornado touched down near the small town of Kendal, just north of Newtonville. Only six minor injuries were reported.

=== 1991 ===
- March 27 - an early season tornado struck Sarnia, Ontario, causing over $25 million in damage.
- June 23 - an F0 tornado touched down just north of Cardston, Alberta.
- July 28 - a brief F0 tornado touched down in Edmonton, Alberta. It crossed the North Saskatchewan River before dissipating.
- August 1 - an F0 tornado hit Forest Heights Park in Edmonton, Alberta.
- August 27 - an F3 tornado touched down in the Mauricie region. The town of Maskinongé was hardest hit among three communities, with 60% of its buildings damaged. Fifteen people were injured and the estimated damage cost was upwards of $25 million.

=== 1992 ===
- June 22 - tornadoes touched down across southern Manitoba, including two F1s near Winkler and an F0 in St. Claude.
- June 24 - tornadoes, large hail and torrential downpours affected southern Manitoba. Tennis ball sized hail fell near Morden and winds gusting to 154 km/h (96 mph) were recorded at Pilot Mound. There were seven confirmed tornado touchdowns and numerous funnel clouds in Manitoba that day. There was some very crisp video footage of one F0 rope tornado traversing farmland near Kelwood. Ground scouring occurred and a hydraulic filter pipe was carried 600 yards (550 m) before being embedded about 5 feet (150 cm) into ground. The region had been affected by severe weather the day before as well.
- August 8 - an F1 tornado struck north of Deloraine, Manitoba.

=== 1993 ===
- June 12 - four tornadoes touched down across Manitoba as intense thunderstorms ripped through the area. The strongest, an F1, touched down west of Brookdale. Three F0s also touched down near Birtle, Fisher Branch, and Alexander.
- June 22 - three weak tornadoes touched down in Manitoba. Two F0s touched down near Gladstone, Manitoba, and an F1 touched down west of Shell River.
- July 9 - an F1 tornado touched down in West Nipissing, Ontario, and travelled east for 15 km (9.3 mi). Originally rated F2, this tornado was downgraded after survey teams discovered the houses that had been destroyed were mobile homes, not wood-framed houses.
- July 29 - a series of violent thunderstorms tracked across Central Alberta, spawning three tornadoes. The strongest of these was an F3 in Holden, 90 km (56 mi) east of Edmonton. An F0 touched down in near Falun, east of Pigeon Lake, and an F1 tornado was reported 60 km (37 mi) northeast of Lac La Biche.
- August 1 - an F0 tornado touched down northwest of Sault Ste. Marie, Ontario.

=== 1994 ===
- June 14 - an F2 tornado uprooted trees and hydro poles on Caliper Lake, Ontario.
- June 30 - an F2 tornado hit southeast of Kenora, Ontario, destroying boats, blowing apart cottages, and uprooting trees.
- July 9 - one person was killed when an F2 tore through the town of Saint-Charles-sur-Richelieu, Quebec. Three other people were injured, and about a dozen homes were damaged.
- July 10 - an F4 tornado tore through Birtle, Manitoba, which tracked for 29.4 km. The tornado destroyed several farm houses and barns, injuring 2 during its lifetime.
- August 4 - an F3 tornado touched down in Aylmer, Quebec, across the river from Ottawa, injuring 15 people. The tornado path was 8 km (5.0 mi) long and caused major damage to a downtown residential subdivision, including homes destroyed. A second tornado had previously touched down just across the Ottawa River in Carp. In Quebec, other tornadoes touched down near Laurel and Rawdon.
- August 27 - an F4 tornado hit rural farmland near Turtle Mountain, Manitoba. Devastation was especially visible at Mayfair Hutterite Colony, and there was well over $1 million in damage. There were no injuries or deaths.

=== 1995 ===
- June 20 - thunderstorms rumbled for seven hours over Manitoba, producing 90 km/h (56 mph) winds which blew trees and power lines over. The storm produced a weak tornado.
- July 15 - a large progressive derecho thunderstorm produced severe winds over an expansive area of the central Great Lakes and New England overnight. It also contained at least six tornadoes that hit Central Ontario, most centred on or north of the Kawartha Lakes. The strongest was an F2 tornado that destroyed a marina at Bridgenorth and overturned a houseboat on Lake Chemong, trapping 20 occupants for a few hours until they were rescued, just north of Peterborough. One person was killed in Bridgenorth.
- July 15 - an F3 tornado touches down just west of Sault Ste Marie, Ontario. The tornado touched down near Pointe Des Chenes campground and moved through a heavily wooded area downing all trees in its path. The tornado then demolished 3 seasonal camps two of which were completely destroyed. 3 houses suffered significant damage, one house had the entire second floor ripped a part. The tornado would also rip the entire roof off one house well another house had its roof ripped off and the front exterior wall demolished.
- July 26 - a tornado in Fredericton, New Brunswick, took the roof off a government building and damaged a tennis court dome.
- August 14 - a tornado touched down near Barrie, Ontario.
- August 29 - several farms were destroyed when a tornado lasting a couple of minutes affected Spring Valley, Saskatchewan, near Moose Jaw.

=== 1996 ===
- April 20 - Multiple tornadoes hit Grey, Wellington and Dufferin counties. Two F3 class tornadoes touched down in Grey County (Williamsford), Wellington County and Dufferin County. Significant property damage occurred; nine people were injured by the two tornadoes. These tornadoes were part of the larger Tornado outbreak sequence of April 1996.
- May 20 - a strong thunderstorm damaged one of the four screens of a drive-in theatre at Thorold, Ontario, in the Niagara Region. Coincidentally, this drive-in was planning to show the movie Twister that evening. Eyewitnesses reported seeing a small funnel cloud, but the physical evidence was inconclusive. Distorted and exaggerated media reports of this event abound; most claimed that the storm blew down the screen while Twister was being shown on it. The storm actually took place before sundown. However, a small tornado did touch down in Stoney Creek that same evening.
- July 4 - an estimated nine tornadoes touched down in the Saskatoon, Maymont and Osler, Saskatchewan, areas. An F3 was measured in the Maymont area, destroying power lines. Homes and property were damaged in the Osler area. Wind gusts in Saskatoon reached 120 km/h (75 mph) and 141 km/h (88 mph), damaging many trees and properties on the east end of the city. A drive-in theatre and a nightclub on the eastern outskirts of the city were also heavily damaged; ironically, the movie that was going to be shown at the drive-in that night was Twister.
- September 6 - A tornado struck Trinity, Newfoundland, damaging houses and a shipyard building.

=== 1997 ===
- June 24 - Lantz, Nova Scotia, F0 tornado touched down in a local ball field at approximately 4:45 pm ADT (UTC−03:00). Golf ball sized hail and intense lightning were also reported with this storm.
- July 2 - during the Southeast Michigan tornado outbreak, an F1, an F2, and an F3 hit Windsor, Ontario, and surrounding areas. See the article for more in-depth information.
- July 4 - an F2 tornado touched down near Grand Falls, New Brunswick. A roof was torn off a building, and farmers' fields were ripped up. The same line of storms also dropped an F2 tornado in Matapédia (New Brunswick/Quebec border), where a couple of barns were destroyed.

=== 1998 ===
- June 2 - during a wider severe weather outbreak (derecho thunderstorm) that struck Southern Ontario in the mid-afternoon, an F1 tornado descended near Holbrook around 3:50 pm EDT (UTC−04:00) and travelled southeastward to Norwich, damaging many buildings, including a church. There were also tornado reports in Elmvale and Dunnville, and several reports of funnel clouds, hail, and high winds.
- July 10 - an F2 tornado touched down in Charleston, New Brunswick, leaving a 90 m (300 ft) by 7 km (4.3 mi) path of damage. A mobile home was thrown 30 m (98 ft) and totally destroyed. There were minor injuries to the residents in the home.
- July 19 - a weak tornado hit Daysland, Alberta, about 50 km (31 mi) east of Camrose. It damaged power lines, knocking out power to surrounding communities.
- August 11 - a small F1 tornado went through part of Saint-Émile, Quebec City, in the suburbs of Quebec City. It overturned a shed and caused a citywide electricity loss when a garage was slammed into an electric pole.

=== 1999 ===
- May 8 - a tornado over Hull, Quebec, caused $2M damage and tore roofs off buildings. It was caused by the same system that produced the 1999 Oklahoma tornado outbreak between May 3 and May 8. It was the second significant tornado in the Hull-Gatineau area in five years.
- May 18 - three tornadoes touched down close to the western limits of Saskatoon, Saskatchewan. The supercell associated with the tornadoes pelted the city with quarter-sized hail, wind gusts of nearly 100 km/h (62 mph), and over 51 mm (2 in) of rain fell from the half-hour storm.
- July 3 - an F2 tornado north of Kimberley, Ontario, destroyed barns, damaged farmhouses, and uprooted or snapped hundreds of trees.
- July 6 - a Bois-Francs, Quebec, region tornado left 4,000 without power and 200 in need of temporary shelter in Berthierville, Yamaska and Drummondville. Environment Canada records show one person was killed in the event.
- August 4 - an F2 tornado with a twisting but narrow path caused damage in the rural north end of Burlington, Ontario, relocating a motorhome 2 km (1.2 mi) from where it was parked. The tornado track was over 10 km (6.2 mi) long.
- August 18 - a small tornado struck Pugwash, Nova Scotia, causing some localized structural damage. There were no serious injuries.

== See also ==
- List of Canadian tornadoes and tornado outbreaks (since 2001)
- List of fatal and violent Canadian tornadoes
- List of tornadoes and tornado outbreaks
  - List of North American tornadoes and tornado outbreaks
- List of tornadoes striking downtown areas of large cities
- List of F5 and EF5 tornadoes
- Tornado myths
