= List of fatal and violent Canadian tornadoes =

This page lists all tornadoes that have occurred in Canada that have documented fatalities or have a rating of F3/EF3 or higher in intensity.

Canada adopted the Enhanced Fujita scale on April 1, 2013, having previously used the Fujita scale. Both scales measure how violent tornadoes are, measuring damage done by tornadoes to look at how fast the windspeeds would be inside a tornado; however, the Enhanced Fujita scale takes into consideration the condition of buildings before the tornado when assessing damage. Less than 5% of tornadoes that occur in Canada are rated as F3/EF3 or higher.

The only officially rated F5/EF5 tornado in Canada is the 2007 Elie Tornado, however Thomas P. Grazulis of The Tornado Project has unofficially rated the 1920 Alameda-Frobisher Tornado and the 1935 Benson Tornado as F5 (neither having any official intensity ratings due to their age).

The deadliest tornadoes in Canadian history were the 1912 Regina 'Cyclone' (at least 28), 1987 Edmonton 'Black Friday' Tornado (27), and the 1946 Windsor–Tecumseh Tornado (17).

== Severe tornadoes ==
List of Severe Tornadoes in Canadian History
| Date | Tornado | Province | F/EF | Fatalities | Damage ($2023 CAD) | Localities Affected | Notes |
|---|---|---|---|---|---|---|---|
| 1844, August 7 | 1844 Galt Tornado | ON | F1 | 1 | | Galt (now a part of Cambridge, ON) | |
| 1847, September 5 | 1847 Cornwall Tornado | ON | - | 1 | | Cornwall, ON | |
| 1848, June 19 | 1848 Ingersoll Tornado | ON | F2 | 1 | | Ingersoll, ON | |
| 1850, July 5 | 1850 Lake Scugog Tornado | ON | F3 | 3-4 | | Lake Scugog, Sanford-Manchester-Enniskillen, ON | Up to 1 mile wide at peak. |
| 1856, June 29 | 1856 Oxford Tornado | ON | F3 | 4 | | Golspie to Eastwood, ON | |
| 1859, August 5 | 1859 Charlottetown Tornado | PEI | - | ≥2 | | Charlottetown, PEI | At least 2 people drowned when the tornado overturned their boat. |
| 1859, September 11 | 1859 Renfrew Tornado | ON | F1 | 1 | | Renfrew, ON | |
| 1866, June 25 | 1866 Oil Springs Tornado | ON | F2 | 1 | | Oil Springs, ON | |
| 1868, March 16 | 1868 Toronto Tornado | ON | F3 | ≥1 | | Toronto, ON | Unusual early-season tornado. One confirmed death, at the time reports were published, two girls were missing, and one man was severely injured. |
| 1870, July 16 | 1870 Montreal Tornado | QC | - | 1-2 | | Montreal, QC | Tornado not rated but likely at least F2 based on damage. One man was confirmed killed, unconfirmed report of a boy killed. |
| 1870, July 20 | 1870 Wellington Tornado | ON | F1 | 2 | | Wellington, ON | |
| 1875, June 24 | 1875 Lambton Tornado | ON | - | 1 | | Lambton, ON | |
| 1875, June 24 | 1875 Bradford Tornado | ON | F2 | 1 | | Bradford, ON | |
| 1879, August 6 | 1879 Bouctouche Tornado | NB | F3 | 5–8 | $4,200,000 | Grand-Bouctouche, NB | Easternmost fatal tornado in North American history |
| 1880, May 31 | 1880 Lambton County Tornado | ON | F3 | 0 | | Lambton County, ON | |
| 1881, June 28 | 1881 Millbrook Tornado | ON | F2 | 2 | | Millbrook, ON | |
| 1884, May 15 | 1884 Elora-Mapleton Tornado | ON | F0 | 0 | – | Elora, ON – Mapleton, ON | |
| 1885, August 28 | 1885 Muskoka District Tornado | ON | - | 2 | – | Skeleton Lake, ON | |
| 1888, June 6 | 1888 Cornwall Tornado | ON | - | 3~ | – | Cornwall, ON | |
| 1888, July 11 | 1888 Lancaster Tornado | ON | F2 | 1* | – | Lancaster, ON | *Killed 1 in Ontario before crossing the border into New York, where it killed 4. |
| 1888, August 16 | 1888 Salaberry-de-Valleyfield | ON & QC | - | 9–11 | – | South Glengarry, ON – Salaberry-de-Valleyfield, QU | Started in Ontario, and later crossed the border into Quebec |
| 1891, August 9 | 1891 Waterloo Tornado | ON | F1 | 1 | – | Waterloo, ON | |
| 1892, June 14 | 1892 Sainte-Rose Tornado | QC | - | 6 | | Sainte-Rose, QC | |
| 1892, July 10 | 1892 Douglas Tornado | MB | - | 1 | – | Douglas, MB | |
| 1892, July 27 | 1892 Wiarton Tornado | ON | F2 | 6 | – | Wiarton, ON | Intense mile-wide tornado. High end F2, possibly F3 |
| 1892, August 8 | 1892 Belleville Tornado | ON | - | 1 | – | 10 km south of Belleville, ON | |
| 1892, August 17 | 1892 O'Leary Tornado | PEI | - | 1 | – | O'Leary, PEI | |
| 1893, May 23 | 1893 Ontario & Quebec Tornado Outbreak | ON | F2 | 1 | – | Tillsonburg, ON to Brantford, ON | Part of a tornado outbreak in Ontario and Quebec |
| 1893, May 23 | 1893 Ontario & Quebec Tornado Outbreak | ON | F2 | 4 | – | Ottawa, ON | Part of a tornado outbreak in Ontario and Quebec |
| 1893, May 23 | 1893 Ontario & Quebec Tornado Outbreak | QC | - | 1 | – | Montreal, QC | Part of a tornado outbreak in Ontario and Quebec |
| 1894, May 20 (or 27) | 1894 Huron County Tornado | ON | - | Multiple | – | Huron County, ON | Described as a severe tornado that killed a considerable number of people |
| 1896, July 2 | 1896 Lac Deschênes Waterspout | ON | - | 3 | – | Lac Deschênes | Waterspout on Lac Deschênes near Ottawa, overturned numerous boats killing 3 |
| 1897, July 3 | 1897 Rapid City Tornado | MB | - | 1 | – | Rapid City, MB | |
| 1898, June 20 | 1898 Benson Tornado | SK | - | 1 | – | Benson, SK | |
| 1898, September 26 | 1898 Merritton Tornado | ON | - | 5-11 | – | Merritton, ON | Killed at least 5 in Merritton (now part of St. Catharines, Ontario) before crossing into the United States and dissipating near Tonawanda, NY. Five of the injured were not expected to survive, and unconfirmed reports of a sixth death. |
| 1900, June 5 | 1900 Winnipeg Tornado | MB | - | 1 | – | Winnipeg, MB | |
| 1900, August 31 | 1900 Wapella Tornado | SK | - | 3 | – | Wapella, SK | |
| 1902, July 17 | 1902 Chesterville Tornado | ON | F4 | 4-5 | – | Chesterville, ON | At peak was roughly 2km (about 1.2 miles) wide, likely among the widest known Canadian tornadoes |
| 1903, August 11 | 1903 Rockland Tornado | ON | F3 | 0 | – | Rockland, ON | |
| 1905, July 15 | 1905 Winnipeg Tornado | MB | - | 4 | – | Winnipeg, MB | |
| 1906, June 8 | 1906 Sarnia Tornado | ON | F3 | 5 | – | Sarnia, ON | |
| 1907, May 26 | 1907 Nixon Tornado | ON | F3 | 0 | – | Nixon, ON, Waterford, ON | F3 tornado destroyed much of Nixon before moving through the countryside and striking Waterford. 8 days later Nixon would be struck by another, unrated tornado which destroyed 2 houses and a grocery store. |
| 1907, August 8 | 1907 Last Mountain Lake Tornado | SK | - | 1 | – | Last Mountain Lake, SK | |
| 1907, August 8 | 1907 Zealandia Tornado | SK | - | 1 | – | Zealandia, SK | |
| 1907, August 14 | 1907 Battle River Tornado | AB | - | 3 | – | 30 km south of Vermilion, AB | |
| 1908, July 22 | 1908 Frobisher Tornado | SK | F3 | 3 | – | Frobisher, SK | |
| 1908, July 28 | 1908 Fillmore Tornado | SK | - | 1 | – | Fillmore, SK | |
| 1909, July 1 | 1909 Carievale Tornado | SK | - | 5 | – | Carievale, SK | |
| 1909, July 16 | 1909 Golden Valley Tornado | SK | F3 | 0 | – | Golden Valley, SK | |
| 1910, June 21 | 1910 Palmer Tornado | SK | - | 3-6 | – | Palmer, SK | |
| 1910, June 27 | 1910 Weyburn Tornado | SK | - | 1 | – | Weyburn, SK | |
| 1910, July 3 | 1910 Grandora Tornado | SK | - | 1 | – | Grandora, SK | |
| 1912, June 30 | 1912 Regina Cyclone | SK | F4 | ≥28 | $103,000,000 | Regina, SK | 28 has become the generally accepted death toll. A reporter accused city planners of downplaying the death toll to not affect a real estate boom and claimed to have interviewed over 40 survivors, some of whom recounted seeing more than 28 bodies laid out by a single undertaker. He gave a death toll of 45. In other reports published in the years since, tolls of 31,32,36, and 41 have been reported. |
| 1913, August 14 | 1913 Ogema Tornado | SK | - | 2 | – | Ogema, SK | |
| 1914 June 6 | 1914 Woodstock Tornado | ON | - | 2 | – | Woodstock, ON | |
| 1915, June 25 | 1915 Redcliff Tornado | AB | F4 | 2-3 | – | Grassy Lake, AB to Redcliff, AB | |
| 1916, June 2 | 1916 Perth Tornado | ON | F3 | 1 | – | Perth, ON | High end F3 |
| 1916, August 28 | 1916 Atwater Tornado | SK | - | 1 | – | Atwater, SK | |
| 1919, June 27 | 1919 Quill Lake Tornado | SK | - | 2 | – | Quill Lake, SK | |
| 1919, June 27 | 1919 Lanigan Tornado | SK | - | 1 | – | Lanigan, SK | |
| 1920, Jul 22 | 1920 Alameda-Frobisher Tornado | SK | F5 (estimated) | ≥4 | $1,400,000 | Alameda, SK – Frobisher, SK | No official ratings, but was unofficially rated as F5 by Thomas P. Grazulis |
| 1922, Jun 22 | 1922 Southern Manitoba Tornado(es) | MB | - | 5 | - | Portage la Prairie, MB | Officially recorded as just one tornado, but was thought to have been multiple |
| 1922, August 15 | 1922 Eastend Tornado | SK | F3 | 2 | – | Eastend, SK | |
| 1923, June 16 | 1923 Sceptre Tornado | SK | - | 1 | – | Sceptre, SK | |
| 1923, June 16 | 1923 Rosetown Tornado | SK | - | 1 | – | Rosetown, SK | |
| 1923, June 25 | 1923 Wellington & Peel Tornado | ON | F2 | 4 | – | Wellington, ON to Long Branch, ON | Long track fast-moving tornado, on the ground for two hours, travelling over 100 km. |
| 1923, July 7 | 1923 McGee Tornado | SK | - | 1 | – | McGee, SK | |
| 1926, July 9 | 1926 Lambton-Middlesex Tornado | ON | F3 | 0 | – | Watford, ON to Strathroy, ON | |
| 1926, July 14 | 1926 Waldron Tornado | SK | - | 2 | – | Waldron, SK | |
| 1927, June 18 | 1927 Elfros Tornado | SK | F3 | 1 | – | Elfros, SK | |
| 1932, May 31 | 1932 Aberdeen Tornado | SK | - | 1 | – | Aberdeen, SK | |
| 1933, June 17 | 1933 Saskatoon Tornado | SK | - | 1 | – | Saskatoon, SK | |
| 1933, July 21 | 1933 Point Edward Tornado | ON | F1 | 2 | – | Point Edward, ON | |
| 1935, July 1 | 1935 Benson Tornado | SK | F5 (estimated) | 1 | – | Benson, SK | No official ratings, but was unofficially rated as F5 by Thomas P. Grazulis |
| 1935, July 6 | 1935 Smiley Tornado | SK | F3 | 1 | – | Smiley, SK | |
| 1935, July 28 | 1935 Île-à-la-Crosse Tornado | SK | - | 1 | – | Île-à-la-Crosse, SK | |
| 1935, August 1 | 1935 Newington Tornado | ON | F2 | 1 | – | Newington, ON | |
| 1935, August 12 | 1935 Norwich Tornado | ON | F2 | 1 | – | Norwich, ON | |
| 1936, October 29 | 1936 Trenton Tornado | ON | F2 | 2 | – | Trenton, ON | Somewhat unusual late season tornado. |
| 1939, June 7 | 1939 Kettle Point Tornado | ON | F0 | 3 | – | Kettle Point, ON | Three people drowned when their boat was overturned by the tornado |
| 1943, June 1 | 1943 Aldborough Tornado | ON | F2 | 1 | – | Aldborough, ON | |
| 1944, June 23 | 1943 Lambton-Middlesex Tornado | ON | F3 | 1 | – | Lambton, ON to Middlesex, ON | |
| 1944, July 7 (or July 1) | 1944 Lebret Tornadoes | SK | - | 4 | – | Lebret, SK | Two tornadoes struck Lebret, killing 4. Source indicates date of July 7, elsewhere a date of July 1 is given for the event. |
| 1944, Aug 9 | 1944 Kamsack Tornado | SK | F4 | 4 | – | Kamsack, SK | |
| 1946, Jun 17 | 1946 Windsor–Tecumseh Tornado | ON | F4 | 17 | $163,000,000 | River Rouge, USA – Windsor, ON – Tecumseh, ON | High-end F4, borderline F5. One of 3 tornadoes to strike Windsor in June 1946. |
| 1946, Jun 24 | 1946 Fort Frances Tornado | ON | F2 | 1 | – | International Falls, USA – Fort Frances, ON – Rainy River, ON | Crossed the border from Minnesota into Ontario. |
| 1947, July 3 | 1947 Red River Valley Tornadoes | MB | - | 1* | – | Windygates, MB | What was likely a tornado family began in southern Manitoba, killing one at Windygates before moving into North Dakota and Minnesota, killing 9, unclear how many tornadoes were involved. |
| 1947, August 30 | 1947 Haliburton-Hastings Tornado | ON | F3 | 1 | – | Gooderham, ON - Coe Hill, ON - Cloyne, ON | Rating is conservative, may have been F4 |
| 1948, July 30 | 1948 Kawartha Lakes Tornado | ON | F3 | 1 | – | Kawartha Lakes, ON | |
| 1950, August 11 | 1950 Morley Tornado | AB | - | 4 | – | Morley, AB | |
| 1953, May 21 | 1953 Sarnia Tornado | ON | F4 | 7 | – | Port Huron, USA – Sarnia, ON | Crossed the border from Michigan into Ontario |
| 1956, May 12 | 1956 Essex Tornado | ON | F3 | 0 | – | Edgewater Beach - McGregor, ON | |
| 1963, June 29 | 1963 Spy Hill Tornado | SK | F3 | 1 | – | Spy Hill, SK | |
| 1963, July 2 | 1963 La Sarre Tornado | QC | - | 1 | | La Sarre, QC | |
| 1964, July 2 | 1964 Orchardville Tornado | ON | F0 | 1 | – | Orchardville, ON | |
| 1965, July 9 | 1965 Bruce & Grey County Tornado | ON | F3 | 0 | – | Formosa, ON to Markdale, ON | |
| 1967, April 17 | 1967 St.Jacobs Tornado | ON | F3 | 1 | – | St.Jacobs, ON | |
| 1970, August 20 | 1970 Sudbury Tornado | ON | F3 | 5 | $78,200,000+ | Greater Sudbury, ON | |
| 1970, August 20 | 1970 Field Tornado | ON | F3 | 1 | | Field, ON | Originally thought to be the same tornado as the Sudbury event the same day, but now known to be two separate tornadoes. |
| 1972, June 24 | 1972 Maniwaki Tornado | QC | - | 2 | $700,000 | Maniwaki, QC | |
| 1972, July 28 | 1972 Bawlf Tornado | AB | - | 1 | | Bawlf, AB | |
| 1972, August 9 | 1972 Ottawa Tornado | ON | F0 | 1 | | Ottawa, ON | |
| 1973, August 27 | 1973 Greater Sudbury Tornado | ON | F3 | 0 | | Greater Sudbury, ON | Occurred in rural parts of the Greater Sudbury area only 3 years after the deadly 1970 tornado. Damage survey indicated that this tornado was likely more violent than the 1970 event, with potential F4 damage noted. |
| 1974, Apr 3 | 1974 Windsor-Flat Rock Tornado | ON | F1 | 9 | $3,040,000 | Flat Rock, MI – Windsor, ON | Originally rated F3, it was later downgraded as it was discovered that damage from the US was accidentally mixed into research for Windsor. As well, the building, which partially collapsed, was discovered to have non-reinforced walls. |
| 1975, July 24 | 1975 Saint-Bonaventure Tornado | QC | - | 3 | | Saint-Bonaventure, QC | |
| 1976, June 3 | 1976 Davidson Tornado | SK | - | 1 | – | Davidson, SK | |
| 1977, July 18 | 1977 St. Malo Tornado | MB | F4 | 3 | – | St. Malo, MB | |
| 1978, Jun 19 | 1978 Morris-Ostenfeld Tornado | MB | - | 1 | $8,680,000 | Morris, MB – Taché, MB – Aubigny, MB – Ste. Anne, MB | |
| 1978, June 27 | 1978 Quebec-Ontario Tornado | QC & ON | F3 | 0 | $3-$4 million | Cascades, QC to Pendleton, ON | |
| 1979, July 10 | 1979 Glasnevin Tornado | SK | - | 1 | – | Glasnevin, SK | |
| 1979, August 7 | 1979 Woodstock-Stratford Tornado | ON | F4 | 0-3 | $434,000,000 | Stratford, ON | Often confused with the Woodstock tornado the same day, although they were two separate events. 3 killed in total, unclear which deaths were caused by which of the two tornadoes. |
| 1979, August 7 | 1979 Woodstock-Stratford Tornado | ON | F4 | 0-3 | $434,000,000 | Woodstock, ON to Waterford, ON | Often confused with the Stratford tornado the same day, although they were two separate events. 3 killed in total, unclear which deaths were caused by which of the two tornadoes. |
| 1982, Jun 30 | 1982 Rocky Mountain House Tornado | AB | F3 | 0 | $1,450,000 | Rocky Mountain House, AB | |
| 1983, May 2 | 1983 Reeces Corners Tornado | ON | F4 | 0 | – | Reeces Corners, ON | |
| 1983, July 8 | 1983 Lloydminster Tornado | AB | F3 | 0 | $1,000,000 | Lloydminster, AB | |
| 1983, July 20 | 1983 Pennant Tornado | SK | F3 | 0 | | Pennant, SK | |
| 1983, November 10 | 1983 Millar Channel Waterspout | BC | - | 2 | – | Between Flores Island, BC and Vancouver Island, BC | Tornadic waterspout capsized a boat, two people drowned. |
| 1984, June 29 | 1984 Big Coulee Tornado | AB | F3 | 1 | | Big Coulee, AB | |
| 1984, July 8 | 1984 St. Claude Tornado | MB | F3 | 0 | | St. Claude, MB | |
| 1984, July 15 | 1984 Pembroke Tornado | ON & QC | F3 | 1 | – | Pembroke, ON to Blue Sea Lake, QC | |
| 1985, May 31 | 1985 Hopeville Tornado | ON | F3 | 0 | | Hopeville, ON | A part of the 1985 Midwest Tornado Outbreak. F2, according to some sources. |
| 1985, May 31 | 1985 Mansfield Tornado | ON | F3 | 0 | | Mansfield, ON | A part of the 1985 Midwest Tornado Outbreak |
| 1985, May 31 | 1985 Barrie Tornado | ON | F4 | 8 | $337,000,000 | Barrie, ON | A part of the 1985 Midwest Tornado Outbreak |
| 1985, May 31 | 1985 Grand Valley-Tottenham Tornado | ON | F4 | 4 | – | Grand Valley, ON – Orangeville, ON – Tottenham, ON | A part of the 1985 Midwest Tornado Outbreak. Longest track tornado in Canada at over 110 km. |
| 1985, May 31 | 1985 Rice Lake Tornado | ON | F3 | 0 | – | Rice Lake, ON – Erin, ON | A part of the 1985 Midwest Tornado Outbreak – twin tornado with Alma Tornado. F2, according to some sources. |
| 1985, May 31 | 1985 Alma-Hillsburgh Tornado | ON | F3 | 0 | – | Alma, ON – Rice Lake, ON – Erin, ON | A part of the 1985 Midwest Tornado Outbreak – twin tornado with Rice Lake |
| 1985, June 18 | 1985 Saint-Sylvère Tornado | QC | F3 | 0 | – | Saint-Sylvère, QC | |
| 1985, September 9 | 1985 Big Rideau Lake Tornado | ON | F0 | 1 | – | Big Rideau Lake, ON | One killed when a houseboat on the lake was struck |
| 1986, June 16 | 1986 Lac Gareau Tornado | QC | F3 | 0 | – | Lac Gareau, QC | |
| 1986, June 16 | 1986 Haliburton-Hastings Tornado | ON | F3? | 0 | – | Hindon Hill, ON to Maynooth, ON | Long track tornado which travelled 80 km. Rating downgraded to F2 in 2005 due to some of the destroyed cottages being of questionable construction. However, a 5-bedroom house that was swept off its foundation and a stone cottage leveled to the ground call this downgrade into question. Was originally "confidently" rated F3 |
| 1987, Jul 31 | 1987 Edmonton Tornado | AB | F4 | 27 | $771,000,000 | Edmonton, AB | Very high-end F4, missed the F5 rating by 1 mph |
| 1989, July 8 | 1989 Peebles Tornado | SK | F3 | 0 | – | Peebles, SK | |
| 1990, August 12 | 1990 Norwich Township Tornado | ON | F2 | 1 | | Norwich, ON | |
| 1990, August 28 | 1990 Southwold Tornado | ON | F3 | 0 | – | Southwold, ON | Every building in the hamlet of Frome was damaged or destroyed. |
| 1991, August 27 | 1991 Maskinongé Tornado | QC | F3 | 0 | – | Maskinongé, QC | |
| 1991, August 27 | 1991 Pierreville Tornado | QC | F3 | 0 | – | Pierreville, QC | |
| 1993, Jul 29 | 1993 Holden Tornado | AB | F3 | 0 | – | Holden, AB | |
| 1994, July 9 | 1994 Saint-Charles-sur-Richelieu Tornado | QC | F2 | 1 | – | Saint-Charles-sur-Richelieu, Quebec | |
| 1994, Jul 10 | 1994 Turtle Mountain Tornado | MB | F4 | 0 | $1,850,000 | Killarney-Turtle Mountain, MB | |
| 1994, August 4 | 1994 Aylmer Tornado | QC | F3 | 0 | – | Aylmer QC | F2 according to some sources. |
| 1995, August 29 | 1995 Spring Valley Tornado | SK | F3 | 0 | | Spring Valley, SK | |
| 1996, April 20 | 1996 Williamsford Tornado | ON | F3 | 0 | – | Williamsford, ON | High end F3, possibly low end F4 |
| 1996, April 20 | 1996 Arthur - Violet Hill Tornado | ON | F3 | 0 | – | Arthur, ON | |
| 1996, July 4 | 1996 Fielding Tornado | SK | F3 | 0 | – | Fielding, SK | |
| 1996, July 4 | 1996 Hepburn - Aberdeen Tornado | SK | F3 | 0 | – | Hepburn, SK to Aberdeen, SK | |
| 1999, July 6 | 1999 Drummondville Tornado | QC | F1 | 1 | – | Drummondville QC | |
| 2000, July 14 | 2000 Pine Lake Tornado | AB | F3 | 12 | $21,600,000 | Pine Lake, AB | |
| 2000, July 23 | 2000 Marwayne Tornado | AB | F3 | 0 | – | Marwayne, AB | |
| 2006, August 5 | 2006 Gull Lake Tornado | MB | F2 | 1 | – | Gull Lake, MB | |
| 2007, June 22 | 2007 Elie Tornado | MB | F5 | 0 | $55,600,000 | Elie, MB | Canada's first and only officially rated F5/EF5 |
| 2007, June 22 | 2007 Oakville Tornado | MB | F3 | 0 | – | Oakville, MB | Occurred at the same time as the Elie F5. |
| 2007, June 23 | 2007 Baldur Tornado | MB | F3 | 0 | – | Baldur, MB | |
| 2007, June 23 | 2007 Pipestone Tornado | MB | F3 | 0 | – | Baldur, MB – Oakville, MB – Pipestone, MB | Very violent tornado that did not hit anything significant, could have been F5 |
| 2009, July 9 | 2009 Lac Seul Tornado | ON | F2 | 3 | – | Lac Seul, ON | Killed 3 tourists from Oklahoma |
| 2009, August 20 | 2009 Durham Tornado | ON | F2 | 1 | – | Durham, ON | |
| 2010, June 29 | 2010 Raymore Tornado | SK | F3 | 0 | $18,000,000 | Kawacatoose Reserve 88, SK | |
| 2011, August 21 | 2011 Goderich Tornado | ON | F3 | 1 | – | Goderich, ON | Caused significant electrical outages to surrounding municipalities |
| 2017, June 18 | 2017 Saint-Anne-du-Lac | QC | EF3 | 0 | – | Sainte-Anne-du-Lac, QC | |
| 2018, August 3 | 2018 Alonsa Tornado | MB | EF4 | 1 | $2,300,000 | Alonsa, MB | EF5 damage observed, but building was deemed poor condition |
| 2018, September 21 | 2018 Ottawa Tornado | ON | EF3 | 0 | $388,000,000 | Ottawa, ON | High-end EF3, borderline EF4 |
| 2020, August 8 | 2020 Scarth Tornado | MB | EF3 | 2 | – | Scarth, MB | High-end EF3, borderline EF4 |
| 2021, June 21 | 2021 Mascouche Tornado | QC | EF2 | 1 | – | Mascouche, QC | |
| 2023, July 1 | 2023 Didsbury Tornado | AB | EF4 | 0 | – | Didsbury, AB | |
| 2026, June 9 | 2026 Oxbow Tornado | SK | EF3 | 0 | – | Oxbow, SK | |
| 2026, June 28 | 2026 Rossburn Tornado | MB | EF3 | 0 | – | Rossburn, MB | |
| 2026, July 11 | 2026 Tulliby Lake Tornado | AB | EF3 | 0 | – | Tulliby Lake, AB | |

== See also ==
- List of Canadian tornadoes and tornado outbreaks (before 2001)
- List of Canadian tornadoes and tornado outbreaks (since 2001)
- List of F5 and EF5 tornadoes
- Tornado
