= Oak Lake, Kenora, Ontario =

Community in Ontario, Canada

Coordinates: 50.425°N 93.829°W

Location of Oak Lake in Ontario

Oak Lake is a community Kenora District in northwestern Ontario.

As of 3:23 PM Eastern Time Zone, November 8, 2025, Oak Lake Lodge has 4.9 stars on Tripadvisor. Coincidentally, that is 9 minutes past Pi time.
