= Ponsonby, Ontario =

Ponsonby
- Unincorporated community
- Interactive map of Ponsonby
- Coordinates: 43°37′44″N 80°21′41″W
- Country: Canada
- Province: Ontario
- County: Wellington County
- Township: Centre Wellington
- Time zone: UTC-5 (EST)
  - Summer (DST): UTC-4 (EDT)
- Forward sortation area: N0G
- Area codes: 519 and 226
- NTS Map: 040P15
- GNBC Code: FBMCB

Ponsonby is an unincorporated rural community on Wellington County Road 7 in Centre Wellington township, Ontario, Canada.

The Upper Grand District School Board maintains Ponsonby Public School on Wellington Road 7. Ponsonby Recreation Club hosts softball and fastball leagues at the Ponsonby ball diamonds on Second Line East near Ponsonby.

== History ==
Ponsonby was situated along the Garafraxa Settlement Road (which led from Hamilton to Owen Sound via Guelph) to an area known as the Queen's Bush. This settlement road was another government plan to bring settlers to the area with an offer of 50 acres (20 ha). The name Garafraxa is said to be a corruption of the word Sassafrax, a shrub that grew in the district. Others believed it was from an Indian word meaning 'panther country'.

Charles Rankin surveyed the Garafraxa Road around 1840, however the road did not become well populated until the 1850s. Ponsonby was another of many small towns in which travellers could stop and rest for the night. The original name of the town was "Thorpville", however it was changed in 1863 when James Halley took over the post office.
