= Oak Lake, Peterborough County, Ontario =

Coordinates: 44.264°N 77.524°W

Location of Oak Lake in Ontario

Oak Lake is a community in Peterborough County of Ontario, Canada.
