= 1979 Woodstock, Ontario tornadoes =

Weather event in Ontario, Canada

- A large tornado approaching the city of Woodstock.

Meteorological history
- Duration: August 7, 1979

Tornado outbreak
- Tornadoes: 5 confirmed
- Max. rating: F4 tornado
- Duration: 1-2 hours

Overall effects
- Casualties: 2 fatalities, 142 injuries
- Damage: In 1979 Canadian Dollars: $100 million (adjusted to 2024, CDN $404 million)
- Areas affected: Ontario

On the evening of Tuesday, August 7, 1979, at least three tornadoes touched down in southwestern Ontario, devastating scores of farms and homes in the Woodstock area. The southern end of that city suffered some of the most intense destruction along with several other nearby towns in Oxford County. Two people died, 142 were injured, and hundreds of homes suffered significant damage. Overall monetary losses totaled an approximate $100 million in 1979 Canadian dollars.

== Meteorological synopsis ==
A relatively cool and dry air mass was being pushed in from the north by means of a cold front, into warm and unstable air from the southern United States. Severe weather had already affected northeastern Ontario the evening before with this same cold front. During the late morning of the 7th the front had stalled across the Bruce Peninsula, where newer convection produced a couple of weak F1 tornadoes near the towns of Wiarton and Tara. It has been speculated that a large outflow boundary associated with these particular storms may have interacted with the lake breeze fronts, thus resulting in the Woodstock and Stratford tornadic supercells later that day.

The Ontario Storm Prediction Centre in Toronto issued a severe thunderstorm watch for southwestern Ontario at 3:40 pm. The first thunderstorms of the afternoon began forming over Lake Huron before coming ashore in southern Bruce County (Toll, 1980). Storm motion was primarily to the southeast, and as these storms quickly began to intensify, reports of large hail began to pour in. A severe thunderstorm warning was issued at 6:15pm for Oxford, Perth County and Waterloo Region (Toll, 1980). A broken line of intense thunderstorms propagated toward Highway 401 with the two most intense storms located near Stratford and Embro. At this point, a tornado touchdown was mere minutes away as they began to morph into the powerful supercell variety, possibly a result of convergence along the Lake Erie and Lake Huron breeze fronts.

== Stratford and Woodstock tornadoes ==
At 6:18pm, the supercell thunderstorm located near Stratford spawned a tornado a couple of kilometres south of that town. Moving to the southeast at approximately 60 km/h, it quickly became stronger and as it passed north of Hickson some twenty minutes later, its path had widened to 1 kilometre as the tornado attained F4 intensity. Farm homes and outbuildings along the path were levelled by the tornado. The path began to curve towards the east-northeast thereafter as the tornado began to weaken (Newark, 1979). It dissipated approximately four kilometres east of Bright at 6:56pm, after some 30 kilometres on the ground.

At around 6:52 pm, a separate supercell thunderstorm northeast of Embro dropped a tornado near the village of Golspie. As it approached the city of Woodstock within the next ten minutes, the tornado quickly widened to over half a kilometre and took on the appearance as a dark stovepipe or wedge tornado, not unlike those witnessed in the Midwestern United States (Grazulis, 1991). As many as 300 structures sustained damage in a four-kilometre track from Ingersoll Road through Sixth Avenue to Parkinson Road and approaching Highway 401. A church and a school near the intersection of Highway 401 and Norwich Avenue were both destroyed (Toll, 1980). Trees that remained standing were partially debarked and, in a few instances, straw and other small objects were found embedded into the trunks. Among some of the other oddities were a pond in Southside Park that was reportedly sucked dry by the tornado, and a fourteen-foot aluminum boat carried for almost a kilometre. Crossing Highway 401 it blew a tractor-trailer rig into the centre median, badly injuring the driver (Toll, 1980).

After the tornado left Woodstock, it is suspected that the tornado grew to its maximum size. As it passed over the town of Oxford Centre (a hamlet of 250 at the time) the damage path width had reached 1 kilometre. Within two minutes, thirty homes were destroyed, along with the local church and community centre in Oxford Centre (Toll, 1980). The towns of New Durham and Vanessa met a similar fate shortly thereafter, at 7:19 and 7:37pm respectively. A partially filled, forty-foot silo constructed of concrete six inches thick, toppled over on a farm somewhere between Oxford Centre and New Durham. The two deaths were in the New Durham area. A 51-year-old man was killed instantly after being thrown some 200 feet from his two-ton vehicle, and a woman died after being hit with flying glass (Toll, 1980). At this point, the funnel had been on the ground for over twenty minutes and was easily over a mile wide. During this stretch of the tornado's path, two vehicles on two separate farms were tossed nearly a kilometre. In addition to the powerful tornado at hand, hail the size of tennis balls fell north of its track, destroying entire tobacco fields on dozens of farms (Newark, 1979). Eyewitnesses also reported that the tornado was preceded by intense and nearly constant lightning unlike any they had seen before (Toll, 1980).

Plowing southeastward, the tornado damaged several more homes in the north end of Waterford at 8:00pm before dissipating southeast of that town, after nearly 60 kilometres on the ground. As this tornado was at its maximum intensity somewhere between Oxford Centre and Vanessa, eyewitnesses reported seeing a satellite tornado, which accompanied the main circulation (Toll, 1980). On the ground for twenty kilometres, this satellite vortex was comparatively weaker (probably of F0 or F1 intensity) and paralleled the Woodstock tornado track as it moved southeast. All thunderstorm activity in southwestern Ontario ended by 9:30pm as the cold front moved south of Lake Erie.

== Aftermath ==
Following the two violent tornadoes which hit Oxford County and surrounding area, over a thousand people were left homeless, 350 homes were rendered uninhabitable, and two people were dead in addition to 142 injuries. Farmsteads over a century old were completely wiped off the map in some instances. Given the immense amount of damage at hand, the number of people affected, and the relative lack of effective weather warnings, it is remarkable that so few were killed. In yet another remarkable twist, all manner of debris carried by the Woodstock tornado began appearing near the shores of Lake Erie (Toll, 1980). Canceled cheques, dollar bills, photographs, pieces of insulation, and even plywood were among some of the items discovered.

The city of Woodstock was enduring a recession during the late 1970s and this tornado strained the already reduced municipal budget. Assistance manifested itself in a variety of ways during the following weeks and months. People made homeless found short-term residence with neighbours whose homes were less damaged. Ambulances from all over the region (Kitchener, Tillsonburg, London, St. Thomas, and Simcoe) converged on the towns and farms hit hardest by the tornadoes. Local Mennonites also played a significant role in the rebuilding process, with hundreds working tirelessly each day to repair the farming communities of Oxford Centre, New Durham, and Vanessa.

The local government and those of surrounding counties sent thousands of dollars in relief. The city of Toronto donated $50,000 with Brant County sending $25,000 and the town of Stratford giving $10,000 (Toll, 1980). Businesses also set up food and clothing drives for those who lost their homes. Local radio stations set up a 10-hour radio segment called Operation Rebuild which raised almost half a million dollars, a relatively large amount of money for the time. The London Free Press distributed a booklet immortalizing the disaster, aptly titled Tornado. Over 50,000 copies were sold for $2.00 each. The Government of Ontario also granted $9 million in relief funds by the end of the year (Toll, 1980).

== Comparison to other Ontario tornadoes ==
The Stratford and Woodstock tornadoes were both rated on the Fujita scale as F4 tornadoes, the second-highest rating. Up until that time, an F4 tornado had not been recorded in southern Ontario since the May 1953 Sarnia Tornado. Following these 1979 tornadoes, there was another violent tornado outbreak in the Barrie and Grand Valley six years later. As of 2015 there hasn't been an F4 or higher storm that has struck southern Ontario. Comparing the 1953, 1979, and 1985 tornadoes, the Woodstock event was at least as damaging as the Sarnia one. In both instances, photographs display typical F4 damage to frame homes and farm outbuildings, where only piles of rubble remained.

While it is unlikely that the 1979 storm was as powerful as the 1946 Windsor–Tecumseh tornado (where it has been speculated that F5 damage took place), the most glaring difference was that of path width. Whereas the damage paths of the 1946, 1953, and 1985 tornadoes remained under one kilometre, the Woodstock one was more massive in size. In some cases its width approached one mile, likely making it one of the largest tornadoes documented in Canada alongside the July 1987 Edmonton tornado. Environment Canada places the 1979 Woodstock tornado as the eleventh worst in the country's history.
