= Nixon, Ontario =

Community of Norfolk County, Ontario, Canada

- Unincorporated Hamlet in Norfolk County
- Location of Nixon in Ontario
- Coordinates: 42°51′05″N 80°23′59″W
- Country: Canada
- Province: Ontario
- Amalgamated into Norfolk County: 2001 (Single-tier municipality)

Government
  - Mayor: Kristal Chopp
  - Governing Body: The Council of The Corporation of Norfolk County
  - MPs: Diane Finley (Con)
  - MPPs: Toby Barrett (PC)
- Elevation: 224 m (735 ft)
- Time zone: UTC-5 (EST)
  - Summer (DST): UTC-4 (EDT)
- Forward sortation area: N3Y
- Area codes: 519 and 226
- Website: www.norfolkcounty.ca

Nixon is a village in Norfolk County, Ontario, Canada that is almost exclusively residential. This community is east of the town of Delhi, northwest of the town of Simcoe, southwest of the town of Waterford, and northeast of the hamlet of Pinegrove.

Nixon's earliest known inhabitants, from around the year 1000 until approximately 300–350 years later, were the Algonquin nation. They were noted flint-workers and evidence of their skill in crafting arrowheads is still to be found in open worked field areas surrounding the village. The next wave of inhabitants were the Attawandaron nation, the Neutrals, who occupied the region from about 1350 until their absorption by the Iroquois in the year 1651. The last significant native nation to occupy the area was the Mississaugas.

In 2001, Haldimand-Norfolk was dissolved into two separate single-tier counties. Nixon became part of the newly formed County of Norfolk.

== Summary ==
Nixon has a municipal airport that is classified as a small general aviation aerodrome with no amenities for passenger flight airplanes. The local economy includes a variety of farms and a single office building where Nixon Public School was stationed from the 1950s until the early 2000s. Ever since Nixon Public School was closed due to the provincial government cutbacks on education, Nixon has become a bedroom community for people who can afford to live in a single-family house. No shops or grocery stores operate in this community.

This community is the westernmost community to receive water from the Lynn River; which flows directly into Lake Erie.

The former public school was opened as a craft brewery and pub in September 2015. Norfolk County councilhad to approve the land's zoning change from educational to light industrial in order for Norfolk County's third microbrewery to be possible according to their set of by-laws.

=== Climate ===
Throughout the history of the hamlet, Nixon has seen temperatures as cold as −10.2 °C (13.6 °F) and as warm as 26.3 °C (79.3 °F); although summers in Nixon have typically been around 20 °C (68 °F) in the past. March weather in Nixon was pretty much below freezing until the early-2000s when changing weather patterns replaced the March freezing rain with April-like rain.

The winter of 1975 was the only unusually mild winter in the region from 1897 to 1977.
