= List of unincorporated communities in Ontario =

List of communities in Ontario, Canada

The following is a list of unincorporated and informal communities in the province of Ontario, Canada. These communities are not independent communities, these are usually a part of a township for the district, within a county. In non-urban areas, these are postal addresses.

Note: this list is not necessarily organized by municipality. For organized municipalities see list of municipalities in Ontario and for census subdivisions see list of census subdivisions in Ontario.

== # ==
- 10th Line Shore

== A ==
- Aberdeen, Grey County
- Aberdeen, Prescott and Russell County
- Aberfeldy
- Aberfoyle
- Abingdon
- Abitibi 70
- Abitibi Canyon
- Aboyne
- Acanthus
- Achill
- Achray
- Actinolite
- Acton
- Actons Corners
- Adamsdale
- Adamsville
- Adanac, Nipissing District
- Adanac, Parry Sound District
- Addington
- Addison
- Adelaide-Metcalfe
- Adelard
- Adolphustown
- Advance
- Agawa Bay
- Agerton
- Ahmic Harbour
- Ahmic Lake
- Aikensville
- Ailsa Craig
- Airlie
- Alban
- Albert
- Albion
- Albuna
- Albury
- Alcona
- Alder
- Alderdale
- Aldershot
- Alderslea
- Alderville
- Aldreds Beach
- Alexandria
- Alfred
- Algoma Mills
- Algonquin
- Alice
- Allan Mills
- Allan Park
- Allanburg
- Allandale
- Allans Corners
- Allen
- Allenford
- Allens Corner
- Allensville
- Allanwater Bridge
- Allenwood
- Allenwood Beach
- Allimil
- Allisonville
- Alliston
- Alloa
- Alma
- Almira
- Almonte
- Alport
- Alsace
- Alsfeldt
- Althorpe
- Alton
- Altona
- Alvanley
- Alvinston
- Amaranth Station
- Amberley
- Ameliasburgh
- Ameliasburgh Township
- Amesdale
- Amherstburg
- Amherst Pointe
- Amherstview
- Amigo Beach
- Amulree
- Amyot
- Ancaster
- Anderson
- Andrewsville
- Angus
- Angus Glen
- Annable
- Ansnorveldt
- Ansonville
- Anten Mills
- Antrim
- Appin
- Appleby Corner
- Apple Hill
- Apsley
- Ardbeg
- Arden
- Ardendale
- Ardoch
- Ardtrea
- Ariss
- Arklan
- Arkona
- Arkwright
- Armadale
- Armstrong, Thunder Bay District
- Armstrong Corners
- Armstrong Mills
- Aroland First Nation
- Arranvale
- Arthur
- Arva
- Ashburn
- Ashby Mills
- Ashgrove
- Ashton
- Ashworth
- Aspdin
- Asselstine
- Assumption
- Astorville
- Atherley
- Atherton
- Athol, Prince Edward County
- Athol, Stormont, Dundas and Glengarry United Counties
- Atironto
- Attawapiskat
- Atwood
- Auden
- Aughrim
- Austin
- Avening
- Avonmore
- Aylen
- Aylen Lake
- Aylen Lake Station
- Ayr
- Ayton
- Azilda

== B ==
- Babys Point
- Baddow
- Baden
- Badenoch
- Badger's Corners
- Badjeros
- Bagnall
- Baie Du Dore
- Bailey Corners
- Bailieboro
- Bainsville
- Bairds
- Bala
- Balderson
- Ballantrae
- Ballinafad
- Ballycanoe
- Ballycroy
- Ballyduff
- Ballymote
- Balmertown
- Balmy Beach
- Balsam Creek
- Balsam Hill
- Baltimore
- Bamberg
- Banda
- Banner
- Bannockburn
- Baptiste
- Barb
- Bardsville
- Barhead
- Barlochan
- Barriefield
- Bar River
- Barry's Bay
- Barrymere
- Barwick
- Basingstoke
- Bass Creek
- Batawa
- Batchawana Bay
- Bath
- Bathurst
- Batteaux
- Battersea
- Baxter
- Bayfield
- Bayfield Inlet
- Bayham
- Bayside
- Baysville
- Bayview Park
- Beachburg
- Beachville
- Bealton
- Beamsville
- Beardmore
- Bearskin Lake
- Beatrice
- Beaumaris
- Beaverdale
- Beaver Lake
- Beaver Meadow
- Beaverton
- Beeton
- Bélanger
- Belangers Corners
- Belgrave
- Belfountain
- Bell Ewart
- Bellamys
- Bellamys Mill
- Bell Rapids
- Belle-Eau-Claire Beach
- Belle River
- Bell's Corners
- Bells Crossing
- Belmont
- Belmore
- Belton
- Belwood
- Benallen
- Benmiller
- Bennington
- Bent River
- Bentinck
- Bentpath
- Bergland
- Berkeley
- Berriedale
- Berryton
- Berwick
- Bethany
- Bethel, Elizabethtown-Kitley
- Bethel, Kawartha Lakes
- Bethel, Port Colborne
- Bethel, Prince Edward
- Beveridge Locks
- Beverly Hills
- Bewdley
- Bickford
- Biddulph
- Bidwell
- Big Bay
- Big Cedar
- Big Chute
- Big Lake
- Big Trout Lake
- Bigwood
- Bill's Corners
- Birdell
- Birdsalls
- Birds Creek
- Birge Mills
- Birkendale
- Birr
- Biscotasing
- Bishopsgate
- Bishop Corners
- Bismarck
- Bisseltown
- Bisset Creek
- Blackburn Hamlet
- Black Hawk
- Blacks Corners, Dufferin County
- Blacks Corners, Lanark County
- Black Rapids
- Blackstock
- Blackstone Lake
- Blackwater
- Blairton
- Blanchard's Landing
- Blayney
- Blenheim
- Blezard Valley
- Bloomfield
- Bloomington
- Bloomsburg
- Blossom Park
- Blount, Cochrane District, Ontario
- Blount, Dufferin County, Ontario
- Blue
- Blue Church
- Blue Corners
- The Blue Mountains
- Blue Springs, Halton Region
- Blue Springs, Wellington County
- Blue Water Beach
- Blyth
- Blytheswood
- Bobcaygeon
- Bogarttown
- Boland's Bay
- Bolton
- Bona Vista
- Bonarlaw
- Bond Head
- Boninville
- Bonville
- Booth's Harbour
- Boothville
- Borden
- Bordenwood
- Boston
- Bothwell
- Bourget
- Bowling Green, Dufferin County
- Bowling Green, Chatham-Kent
- Bowmanville
- Bowser's Corner
- Box Grove
- Boyds
- Boyne
- Brackenrig
- Bradford
- Bradshaw, Frontenac County, Ontario
- Bradshaw, Lambton County, Ontario
- Braemar
- Braeside
- Bray Lake
- Brechin
- Brent
- Brentwood
- Bridgenorth
- Brier Hill
- Brights Grove
- Brightside
- Britainville
- Britannia
- Britt
- Broadbent
- Brockview
- Bromley
- Brooklin
- Brooksdale
- Brooks Landing
- Brougham
- Brown's Corners
- Brownsville, Durham Regional Municipality, Ontario
- Brownsville, Oxford County, Ontario
- Brucedale
- Bruce Station
- Brussels
- Bryanston
- Buckhorn
- Bulgers Corners
- Bullock
- Bummer's Roost
- Bunessan
- Bunker Hill
- Burford
- Burgessville
- Burgoyne
- Burk's Falls
- Burnbrae
- Burnley
- Burnstown
- Burnt River
- Burpee
- Burton
- Burwash
- Bury's Green
- Butternut Bay
- Buttonville
- Byng Inlet

== C ==
- Cache Bay
- Cachet
- Caderette
- Cadmus
- Caesarea
- Cahore
- Cainsville
- Caintown
- Cairngorm
- Cairo
- Caistor Centre
- Caistorville
- Calabogie
- Caledon East
- Caledonia
- Caledonia Springs
- California, Lanark County
- California, Leeds and Grenville United Counties
- Caliper Lake
- Callum
- Calm Lake
- Calstock
- Calton
- Camborne
- Cambray
- Cambridge, Prescott and Russell United Counties
- Camden
- Camden East
- Camilla
- Camlachie
- Campania
- Campden
- Campbellcroft
- Campbellford
- Campbelltown
- Campbellville
- Camp Oconto
- Canal
- Canborough
- Canfield
- Cannington
- Capreol
- Caramat
- Cardiff
- Cardinal
- Cardwell
- Cargill
- Carholme
- Carleton Place
- Carlingford
- Carlington
- Carlisle
- Carlow
- Carlsbad Springs
- Carlsruhe
- Carmel, Northumberland County
- Carmel, Peterborough County
- Carp
- Carrying Place
- Carss
- Cartier
- Carthage
- Cashtown Corners
- Casimir
- Cassburn
- Castlederg
- Castleford
- Castlemore
- Castleton
- Cat Lake
- Cataraqui
- Cathcart
- Caverlys Landing
- Cayuga
- Cavan-Monaghan
- Cecebe
- Cedarbrae
- Cedar Beach
- Cedar Croft
- Cedardale
- Cedar Grove
- Cedar Meadows
- Cedar Mills
- Cedar Valley, Peterborough County
- Cedar Valley, Wellington County
- Cedar Village
- Cedarville, Grey County
- Cedarville, Simcoe County
- Central Patricia
- Centralia
- Centre Dummer
- Centrefield
- Centre Inn
- Centre Wellington
- Centreton
- Centreview
- Centreville, Bruce County
- Centreville, Grey County
- Centreville, Lennox and Addington County
- Centreville, Oxford County
- Centreville, Waterloo Regional Municipality
- Centurion
- Ceylon
- Chaffey's Lock
- Chalk River
- Charlieville
- Charlottenburgh
- Chartrand Corner
- Chase Corners
- Cheddar
- Cheeseborough
- Chelmsford
- Cheltenham
- Cheney
- Chepstow
- Cherry Valley
- Chesley
- Chesterville
- Chetwynd
- Chevrier
- Chikopi
- Chippewa Hill
- Chippewas of Rama First Nation
- Christian Valley
- Churchill
- Churchville
- Chute-à-Blondeau
- Clappison's Corners
- Clare
- Claremont
- Clarence
- Clarence Creek
- Clarendon Station
- Clareview
- Clarina
- Clarke
- Clarkeburg
- Clarkson
- Clavering
- Clayton
- Clear Creek
- Clear Lake
- Clifford
- Clinton
- Clontarf
- Clover Valley
- Cloyne
- Clyde
- Clyde Forks
- Clydesville
- Cobden
- Coboconk
- Coe Hill
- Coin Gratton
- Colbeck
- Colborne
- Colchester
- Cold Springs
- Coldstream
- Coldwater
- Colebrook
- Cole Lake
- Coleraine
- Colgan
- Collins Bay
- Colpoy's Bay
- Columbus
- Comber
- Combermere
- Commanda
- Concord
- Coniston
- Conn
- Connaught, Renfrew County
- Connaught, Stormont, Dundas and Glengarry United Counties
- Connaught, Timmins
- Connellys
- Conover
- Constance Bay
- Conway
- Cooks Mills, Niagara Region
- Cooks Mills, Nipissing District
- Cook's Shore
- Cookstown
- Cooksville
- Copper
- Cooper's Falls
- Copetown
- Coppell
- Copper Cliff
- Copperhead
- Copperkettle
- Coppins Corners
- Corbeil
- Corbett
- Corbetton
- Corbyville
- Cordova
- Corkery
- Cornell
- Corunna
- Cotieville
- Cotnam Island
- Cottesloe
- Courtice
- Courtland
- Courtright
- Craigleith
- Craigmont
- Craig Shore
- Cramahe
- Crathie
- Crawford
- Crediton
- Creemore
- Creightons Corners
- Creighton Mine
- Cromarty
- Crombie
- Crooked Bay
- Crookston
- Crooked Creek
- Crosby
- Crosshill
- Crowes Landing
- Crow Lake
- Croydon
- Cruikshank
- Crysler
- Crystal Beach
- Crystal Falls
- Cumberland Beach
- Cumberland, Ottawa
- Cumberland, Simcoe County
- Curran
- Curry Hill

== D ==
- Dacre
- Dain City
- Dale
- Dalhousie Lake
- Dalhousie Mills
- Dalkeith
- Dalmeny
- Dalrymple
- Dalston
- Dalton
- Damascus
- Dane
- Darlingside
- Dartford
- Dashwood
- Davis Mills
- Dawn-Euphemia
- Dawn Valley
- Dee Bank
- Deer Lake
- Dejong
- Delamere
- Delaware
- Delhi
- Delta
- Deloro
- Denbigh
- Den-Lou
- Depot Harbour
- Dereham Centre
- Derland
- Derryville
- Desbarats
- Desboro
- Deseronto
- Deux Rivières
- Dexter
- Dickson Hill
- Dillon
- Dinner Point Depot
- Dinorwic
- Dixie
- Dixon's Corners
- Dobbinton
- Doe Lake
- Dokis
- Dominionville
- Domville
- Dongola
- Don Mills
- Donwood
- Doon
- Dorchester
- Dorking
- Dornoch
- Dorset
- Douglas
- Douro
- Douro-Dummer
- Dowling
- Downeyville
- Dracon
- Drayton
- Dresden
- Driftwood
- Dormore
- Drummond Centre
- Drummond/North Elmsley
- Dryden's Corner
- Dublin
- Duclos Point
- Duck Lake
- Dudley
- Dufferin Bridge
- Duffy
- Dulcemaine
- Dunblanc
- Dunchurch
- Dundalk
- Dundas
- Dundonald
- Dunedin
- Dugannon
- Dunkeld
- Dunnet's Corner
- Dunnette Landing
- Dunns Valley
- Dunnville
- Dunsford
- Duntroon
- Durham
- Duthill
- Dutton
- Dutton/Dunwich
- Dunvegan
- Dwight
- Dyer
- Dymond

== E ==
- Eabametoong First Nation
- Eades
- Eads Bush
- Eady
- Eagle
- Eagle Lake, Haliburton County
- Eagle Lake, Parry Sound District
- Eagle River
- Eagles Nest
- Ear Falls
- Earlton
- Earnscliffe
- East Colborne
- East Emily
- East Hungerford
- East Linton
- East Luther-Grand Valley
- East Oakland
- East Oro
- East Oxford
- East Tay Point
- Eastons Corners
- Eastview
- Eastwood
- Eatonville
- Eau Claire
- Eau Claire Station
- Ebbs Shore
- Ebenezer, Hastings County,
- Ebenezer, Leeds and Grenville United Counties
- Ebenezer, Peel Regional Municipality
- Ebenezer, Simcoe County
- Eberts
- Ebordale
- Echo
- Echo Bay
- Eden
- Eden Grove, Leeds and Grenville United Counties
- Eden Grove, Bruce County
- Eden Mills
- Edenhurst
- Edenvale
- Edgar
- Edgars
- Edge Hill
- Edgeley
- Edgewater Beach
- Edgewater Park
- Edmore Beach
- Edville
- Edwards
- Edys Mills
- Effingham
- Egan Creek
- Eganville
- Egbert
- Egerton
- Egmondville
- Elba
- Eldorado
- Elizabeth Bay
- Elizabethtown
- Elizabethville
- Elk Lake
- Ellengowan
- Ellisville
- Elmgrove
- Elmira
- Elm Pine Trail
- Elm Tree
- Elmvale
- Elmwood, Frontenac County
- Elmwood, Grey County
- Eloida
- Elora
- Elphin
- Elsinore
- Elzevir
- Embro
- Embrun
- Emerald
- Emery
- Emsdale
- Englehart
- English Line
- English River
- Ennismore Township
- Ennotville
- Enterprise
- Eramosa
- Erin Mills
- Erindale
- Erinsville
- Ernestown
- Escott
- Essonville
- Estaire
- Etwell
- Eugenia
- Evansville, Manitoulin District, Ontario
- Evansville, Nipissing District, Ontario
- Eversley
- Everton
- Exeter

== F ==
- Fair Valley
- Fairfax
- Fairfield
- Fairfield East
- Fairfield Plain
- Fairground
- Fairholme
- Fairmount, Frontenac County
- Fairmount, Grey County
- Fairplay
- Fairview, Renfrew County
- Fairview, Elgin County
- Fairview, Oxford County
- Fairview, Renfrew County
- Falconbridge, Middlesex County
- Falconbridge, Greater Sudbury
- Falding
- Falkenburg Station
- Falkland
- Fallbrook
- Fallowfield
- Fanshawe
- Fanshawe Lake
- Farewell
- Farleys Corners
- Farmington
- Farnham
- Farquhar
- Farrell Corners
- Fassifern
- Fawcettville
- Fawkham
- Featherstone Point
- Feir Mill
- Feldspar
- Felton
- Fenaghvale
- Fenella
- Fenelon Falls
- Fenwick
- Fergus
- Ferguslea
- Ferguson Corners
- Ferguson Falls
- Fergusons Beach
- Fermoy
- Fesserton
- Feversham
- Field
- Fife's Bay
- Finch
- Fingal
- Fishers Glen
- Fisherville
- Fitzroy Harbour
- Five Corners
- Five Mile Bay
- Flamborough
- Flanders
- Flesherton
- Flinton
- Flinton Corners
- Floradale
- Florence
- Flower Station
- Foleyet
- Folger
- Fonthill
- Fordwich
- Forest
- Forest Lea
- Forget
- Fort Albany
- Forthton
- Fort Irwin
- Fort Severn
- Fowlers Corners
- Fox Corners
- Foxboro
- Foxey
- Foymount
- Frankford
- Franktown
- Frankville
- Franz
- Fraserville
- Fraxa
- Freeman Corners
- Fremo Corners
- French Line
- Froatburn
- Frogmore
- Fullarton
- Fuller
- Fulton

== G ==
- Gads Hill
- Gagnon
- Galbraith
- Galesburg
- Galetta
- Gallimere Beach
- Galingertown
- Galts Corner
- Gambridge
- Gamebridge Beach
- Gameland
- Gananoque Junction
- Gannon Village
- Garden River
- Gardiner
- Garson
- Georgetown
- Georgian Heights
- Georgian Highlands
- Georgian Inlet
- Georgian Sands Beach
- Geraldton
- German Mills
- Gesto
- Gilbertville
- Gibraltar
- Gibson
- Gilchrist Bay
- Gildale
- Gilford
- Gillies Hill
- Gilmour
- Glanmire
- Glascott
- Glasgow
- Glastonbury
- Glen
- Glen Buell
- Glenburn
- Glenburnie
- Glen Cross
- Glenfield
- Glen Huron
- Glencairn
- Glencoe
- Glenelg Centre
- Glen Major
- Glen Nevis
- Glen Oak
- Glenora
- Glenpayne
- Glen Robertson
- Glenshee
- Glenview
- Glenville
- Glen Williams
- Gloucester
- Godfrey
- Gogama
- Golden Lake
- Goldfield
- Gooderham
- Gordon
- Gores Landing
- Gormley
- Gorrie
- Goshen
- Gotham
- Goulais River
- Gouldbourn
- Government Road
- Gowanstown
- Gowganda
- Grafton
- Grand Bend
- Grand Desert
- Granger
- Grant
- Granthurst
- Graphite
- Grasmere
- Grattan
- Gravel Hill
- Gray's Beach
- Greely
- Greenbush
- Green's Corners
- Green Lane
- Greenfield
- Greenock
- Green River
- Green Valley
- Greenview
- Greensborough
- Greensville
- Greenway
- Greenwood, Durham Regional Municipality
- Greenwood, Renfrew County
- Grimsthorpe
- Grimston
- Gros Cap
- Guerin
- Gunter

== H ==
- Habermehl
- Haddo
- Hagar
- Hagarty
- Hagermans Corner's
- Hagersville
- Hagey
- Hagles Corners
- Haileybury
- Haines Lake
- Hainsville
- Haldane Hill
- Haldimand
- Haley Station
- Halfway
- Halfway House Corner
- Halfway Point
- Hallebourg
- Hallecks
- Hallowell
- Hall's Glen
- Halls Mills
- Halpenny
- Halsteads Bay
- Hammertown
- Hammond
- Hampden
- Hampshire Mills
- Hampton
- Hanmer
- Hannon
- Happy Hollow
- Happy Landing
- Happy Valley, Greater Sudbury
- Happy Valley, York Regional Municipality
- Harburn
- Harcourt
- Hardwood Lake
- Harkaway
- Harlock
- Harlowe
- Harrington
- Harrington West
- Harriston
- Harrow
- Harrowsmith
- Hartfell
- Harwood
- Hastings
- Hatchley
- Havelock
- Hawkes
- Hawkestone
- Hawkesville
- Hawkins Corner
- Hawk Junction
- Hay's Shore
- Hazeldean
- Hazzards Corners
- Head Lake
- Heathcote
- Heckston
- Heidelberg Wellesley
- Heidelberg Woolwich
- Hemlock
- Henderson
- Henrys Corners
- Hensall
- Hempstock Mill
- Hepworth
- Hereward
- Heritage Park
- Heron Bay
- Herron's Mills
- Heyden
- Hiam
- Hidden Valley
- Highland Grove
- Hillcrest, Prince Edward County, Ontario
- Hillcrest, Norfolk County, Ontario
- Hillsburgh
- Hillsdale
- Hilly Grove
- Hockley
- Hodgson
- Hogg
- Holford
- Holland
- Holland Centre
- Holland Landing
- Holleford
- Holly
- Holly Park
- Holmesville
- Holstein
- Honey Harbour
- Honeywood
- Hood
- Hope
- Hopetown
- Hopeville
- Hornby
- Horning's Mills
- Hotham
- Hotspur
- Howdenvale
- Huckabones Corner
- Hudon
- Huffs Corners
- Hughes
- Hungry Hollow
- Hurdville
- Hurkett
- Hutton
- Hybla
- Hydro Glen

== I ==
- Ice Lake
- Ida
- Ida Hill
- Ignace
- Ilderton
- Ilfracombe
- Indian River
- Indiana
- Ingle
- Ingleside
- Inglewood
- Inglis Falls
- Ingoldsby
- Ingolf
- Inholmes
- Inkerman
- Inkerman Station
- Innerkip
- Innisville
- Inverary
- Inverhuron
- Invermay
- Inverness Lodge
- Iona
- Iona Station
- Ireland
- Irish Lake
- Iron Bridge
- Irondale
- Ironsides
- Iroquois
- Iroquois Falls
- Island Grove
- Islington
- Ivanhoe
- Iverhaugh
- Ivy
- Ivy Lea

== J ==
- Jackfish
- Jack Lake, Peterborough County
- Jack Lake, Simcoe County
- Jackson
- Jacksonburg
- Jackson's Point
- Jaffa
- Jaffray Melick
- Jamestown
- Jamot
- Janetville
- Jarratt
- Jarvis
- Jasper
- Jeannette
- Jeannettes Creek
- Jefferson
- Jellicoe
- Jellyby
- Jericho
- Jermyn
- Jerseyville
- Jessopville
- Jessups Falls
- Jevins
- Jewellville
- Jockvale
- Joes Lake
- Jogues
- Johnsons Ferry
- Johnston Corners
- Johnstown, Hastings County
- Johnstown, Leeds and Grenville United Counties
- Jones
- Jones Falls
- Jordan
- Jordan Harbour
- Jordan Station
- Josephburg
- Joyceville
- Joyland Beach
- Joyvista Estates
- Juddhaven
- Judgeville
- Junetown
- Juniper Island
- Jura

== K ==
- Kaboni
- Kagawong
- Kakabeka Falls
- Kaladar
- Kaministiquia
- Kanata
- Karalash Corners
- Kars
- Kashabowie
- Kaszuby
- Kathmae Siding
- Katimavik
- Katrine
- Kawartha Hideway
- Kawartha Park
- Kawene
- Keady
- Kearns
- Kedron
- Keelerville, Frontenac County
- Keenansville
- Keene
- Keewatin
- Keldon
- Keller Bridge
- Kellys Corner
- Kemble
- Kemptville
- Kenabeek
- Kennaway
- Kennedys
- Kent Bridge
- Kentvale
- Kerwood
- Keswick
- Kettleby
- Kettle Point 44
- Keward
- Keyser
- Khartum
- Kilgorie
- Killaloe
- Killbear Park
- Kilsyth
- Kilworthy
- Kimball
- Kimberley
- Kinburn
- Kincardine
- Kinmount
- King City
- King Creek
- Kinghorn
- Kinghurst
- Kingsbridge
- Kingscote
- Kingwood
- Kinsale
- Kintail
- Kintore
- Kiosk
- Kirby
- Kirk Cove
- Kirkfield
- Kirkhill
- Kleinburg
- Knight's Corners
- Komoka
- Kormak

== L ==
- L'Amable
- L'Ange-Gardien
- L'Orignal
- La Passe
- La Renouche
- La Rue Mills
- La Salette
- Lac-Sainte-Thérèse
- Lac La Croix
- Lac Seul
- Laclu
- Lady Bank
- Ladysmith
- Lafontaine
- Lafontaine Beach
- Laggan
- Lagoon City
- Lake Bernard
- Lake Charles
- Lake Clear
- Lake Dalrymple
- Lake Dore
- Lake Helen
- Lake Huron Highland
- Lake Joseph
- Lake Morningstar
- Lake on the Mountain
- Lake Opinicon
- Lake Rosalind
- Lake St. Peter
- Lake Traverse
- Lake Valley Grove
- Lakefield
- Lakehurst
- Lakelet
- Lakeport
- Lakeside, Kenora District, Ontario
- Lakeside, Oxford County, Ontario
- Lambeth, Middlesex County
- Lambeth, Oxford County
- Lamlash
- Lammermoor
- Lancaster
- Lancelot
- Landerkin
- Langford
- Langstaff
- Langton
- Lansdowne
- Laskay
- Laurel
- Laurel Station
- Lauriston
- Lavant
- Layton
- Leaside
- Leaskdale
- Leeburn
- Leeds
- Lefaivre
- Lefroy
- Leggatt
- Legge
- Lehighs Corners
- Leith
- Leitrim
- Lemieux
- Letterbreen
- Levack
- Lewisham
- Lighthouse Beach
- Lillies
- Lily Oak
- Limehouse
- Limoges
- Linden Bank
- Lindenwood
- Lindsay
- Links Mills
- Linton
- Linwood
- Lion's Head
- Lisle
- Listowel
- Little Britain
- Little Current
- Little Germany, Grey County
- Little Germany, Northumberland County
- Little Longlac
- Little Rapids
- Lively
- Living Springs
- Lloyd
- Lloydtown
- Lobo
- Lochalsh, Algoma District
- Lochalsh, Huron County
- Lochwinnoch
- Lockerby
- Locksley
- Lombardy
- Londesborough
- Long Bay
- Long Beach, Kawartha Lakes
- Long Beach, Niagara Regional Municipality
- Long Lake, Frontenac County
- Long Lake, Thunder Bay District
- Longlac
- Longford Mills
- Long Point
- Long Sault
- Longwood
- Lords Mills
- Lorimer Lake
- Lorne Park
- Lorneville
- Lorraine
- Lorreto
- Lost Channel, Hastings County
- Lost Channel, Parry Sound District
- Louise
- Lowbanks
- Low Bush River
- Lower Stafford
- Lowther
- Lucan
- Lucasville
- Lucknow
- Ludgate
- Lueck Mill
- Luton
- Lyn
- Lyndale
- Lynden
- Lyndhurst
- Lynedoch
- Lynhurst
- Lynnville
- Lyons

== M ==
- M'Chigeeng
- Mabee's Corners
- Macdiarmid
- MacDonald Bay
- MacDonald Grove
- MacDuff
- Macey Bay
- MacGillivrays Bridge
- Mackenzie
- MacKenzie Point
- Mackey
- Mackey Siding
- Macksville
- MacLarens Landing
- MacTier
- Macton
- Macville
- Madawaska
- Madigans
- Madoc
- Madsen
- Magnetawan
- Maguire
- Maidstone
- Maitland, Huron County
- Maitland, United Counties of Leeds and Grenville
- Malakoff
- Malcolm
- Mallorytown
- Malone
- Malton
- Manbert
- Manchester
- Manhard
- Manilla
- Manions Corners
- Manitou Dock
- Manitouwadge
- Manitowaning
- Mannheim
- Manotick
- Mansewood
- Mansfield, Dufferin County
- Manvers Township
- Maple
- Maple Beach
- Maple Grove
- Maple Hill, Bruce County
- Maple Hill, Frontenac County
- Maple Hill, York Regional Municipality
- Maple Island
- Maple Lane
- Maple Leaf
- Maple Valley, Clearview
- Maple Valley, Severn
- Maplewood
- Marble Bluff
- Marden
- Marlbank
- Mariposa
- Mariposa Beach
- Markdale
- Markstay
- Marmion
- Marmora
- Marmora Station
- Marsh Hill
- Marsville
- Marten River
- Martins
- Martins Corner
- Martintown
- Marionville
- Maryhill
- Marysville, Frontenac County, Ontario
- Marysville, Hastings County, Ontario
- Massanoga
- Massey
- Massie
- Matachewan
- Mathers Corners
- Mattagami First Nation
- Mattice
- Maxville
- Maxwell, Grey County
- Maxwell, Hastings County
- Maxwells
- Mayfield West
- Mayhew
- Mayhews Landing
- Maynard
- Maynooth
- Maynooth Station
- McAlpine Corners
- McCann's Shore
- McCarleys Corners
- McConkey
- McCormick
- McCrackens Landing
- McCrae
- McCreary's Shore
- McCrimmon
- McCulloughs Landing
- McDougall
- McGarry Flats
- McGinnis Creek
- McGrath
- McGregor
- McGuires Settlement
- McIntosh, Bruce County
- McIntosh, Kenora District
- McIntyre, Grey County
- McIntyre, Lennox and Addington County
- McIvor
- McKerrow
- McKillop
- McLean
- McLeansville
- McMillans Corners
- McNaughton Shore
- McRoberts Corner
- Meadowvale
- Medina
- Melbourne
- Meldrum Bay
- Melissa
- Menie
- Merlin
- Merrickville
- Metcalfe
- Meyersburg
- Michipicoten
- Micksburg
- Middleport
- Middleville
- Midhurst
- Mildmay
- Milford
- Milford Bay
- Millbank
- Miller Lake
- Millhaven
- Milliken
- Milnet
- Milverton
- Minaki
- Mindemoya
- Minden
- Mine Centre
- Minesing
- Minett
- Mishkeegogamang First Nation
- Missanabie
- Mississippi Station
- Mitchell
- Mitchell's Bay
- Mitchell's Corners
- Mitchellville
- Moffat
- Moira
- Monck
- Monetville
- Monkland
- Monkton
- Mono Mills
- Monteagle
- Monteith
- Monticello
- Monument Corner
- Moonstone
- Moorefield
- Mooresburg
- Moores Lake
- Mooretown
- Moose Creek
- Moose Factory
- Moosonee
- Moray
- Morganston
- Morrisburg
- Morson
- Morrison Landing
- Mortimer's Point
- Morven
- Mosborough
- Moscow
- Mossley
- Mountain
- Mountain Grove
- Mountain View Beach
- Mount Albert
- Mount Brydges
- Mount Carmel, Prince Edward County, Ontario
- Mount Carmel, Essex County, Ontario
- Mount Carmel, Haldimand County, Ontario
- Mount Carmel, Middlesex County, Ontario
- Mount Elgin
- Mount Forest
- Mount Hope, Bruce County
- Mount Hope, Hamilton
- Mount Joy
- Mount Julian
- Mount Pleasant, Brampton
- Mount Pleasant, Brant County
- Mount Pleasant, Grey County
- Mount Pleasant, Hastings County
- Mount Pleasant, Lennox and Addington County
- Mount Pleasant, Perth County
- Mount Pleasant, Peterborough County
- Mount Pleasant, York Regional Municipality
- Mount Salem
- Mount St. Patrick
- Muncey
- Mullifarry
- Mulock, in the municipality of West Grey, Grey County
- Mulock, in Nipissing District
- Muncey
- Munster
- Murchison
- Murillo
- Musclow
- Muskoka
- Muskoka Lodge
- Muskrat Dam
- Musselman Lake
- Myers Cave
- Myrtle
- Myrtle Station

== N ==
- Nairn, Middlesex County
- Nairn Centre
- Naiscoot
- Nakina
- Nanticoke
- Nantyr
- Nantyr Park
- Napanee
- Naphan
- Napier
- Napperton
- Nares Inlet
- Narrows
- Narva
- Nashville
- Nation Valley
- Naughton
- Navan
- Nayausheeng
- Nelles Corners
- Nellie Lake
- Nemegos
- Nenagh
- Nepean
- Nephton
- Neskantaga First Nation
- Nestleton
- Nestleton Station
- Nestorville
- Nestor Falls
- Netherby
- Neustadt
- Newbliss
- Newboro
- Newburgh
- New Canaan
- New Carlow
- New Credit
- New Dublin
- New Dundee
- New Glasgow
- New Hamburg
- New Liskeard
- New Lowell
- New Prussia
- New Sarum
- New Scotland, Chatham-Kent
- New Scotland, Regional Municipality of York
- New Wexford
- Newburgh
- Newcastle
- Newholm
- Newington
- Newtonville
- Nibinamik First Nation
- Nicholsons Point
- Niisaachewan Anishinaabe Nation
- Nile
- Nipigon
- Niweme
- Nixon
- Nobel
- Nobleton
- Noëlville
- Norham
- Norland
- Norman
- Normandale
- North Augusta
- Northbrook
- Northcote
- North Gower
- North Grenville
- North Hall
- North Lancaster
- North Monaghan
- North Monetville
- North Perry
- Northport
- North Seguin
- Northville
- Norval
- Norvern Shores
- Norwood
- Nosbonsing
- Notre-Dame-des-Champs
- Nottawa
- Novar

== O ==
- O'Briens Landing
- O'Connell
- O'Donnell Landing
- O'Grady Settlement
- O'Reilly's Bridge
- Oak Flats
- Oak Heights
- Oak Lake
- Oak Lake, Peterborough County
- Oak Leaf
- Oak Ridges
- Oak Shores Estates
- Oak Valley
- Oakdale
- Oakdene Point
- Oakgrove
- Oakhill Forest
- Oakland, Brant County
- Oakland, Essex County
- Oaklawn Beach
- Oakwood
- Oba
- Oconto
- Odenback
- Odessa
- Off Lake Corner
- Ogden's Beach
- Ogoki
- Ohsweken
- Oil City
- Ojibway Island
- Ojibways of Hiawatha First Nation
- Old Cut
- Old Fort
- Old Killaloe
- Old Spring Bay
- Old Stittsville
- Old Woman's River
- Oldcastle
- Oldfield
- Olinda
- Oliphant
- Oliver, Essex County
- Oliver, Middlesex County
- Olivet
- Omagh
- Omemee
- Ompah
- Onaping
- Onaping Falls
- Onondaga
- Onyotaa:ka First Nation
- Opasatika
- Opeongo
- Ophir
- Orange Corners
- Oranmore
- Orchard Point
- Orchardville
- Orleans
- Ormsby
- Oro Station
- Oro–Medonte
- Orono
- Orrville
- Orton
- Osaca
- Osborne
- Osceola
- Osgoode
- Oso
- Osprey
- Otonabee-South Monaghan
- Otter Creek, Bruce County, Ontario
- Otter Creek, Hastings County
- Otterville
- Ouellette
- Oustic
- Outlet
- Oxenden
- Oxford Mills

== P ==
- Paget
- Pagwa River
- Pain Court
- Painswick
- Paisley
- Pakenham
- Pakesley
- Palermo
- Palgrave
- Palm Beach
- Palmer Rapids
- Palmerston
- Paradise Lake
- Parham
- Paris
- Parkdale
- Parkersville
- Parkhill
- Park Head
- Pass Lake
- Paudash
- Payne
- Peabody
- Pearceley
- Pearl
- Pearl Lake
- Peawanuck
- Pefferlaw
- Pendleton
- Pentland Corners
- Perivale
- Perkinsfield
- Perm
- Perrins Corners
- Perth Road Village
- Pethericks Corners
- Pevensey
- Phelpston
- Piccadilly
- Pickerel Lake
- Pickle Crow
- Picton
- Pikwakanagan First Nation
- Pinedale
- Pine Grove
- Pine Valley
- Pinewood
- Piperville
- Plainville
- Plantagenet
- Pleasant Corners
- Pleasant Valley, Manitoulin District, Ontario
- Pleasant Valley, Stormont, Dundas and Glengarry Counties, Ontario
- Pleasant Valley, Essex County, Ontario
- Pleasant Valley, Hamilton, Ontario
- Pleasant Valley, Renfrew County, Ontario
- Pleasant View
- Plevna
- Plummer Additional
- Point Abino
- Pointe Fortune
- Pointe au Baril
- Poland
- Pomona
- Ponsonby
- Pontypool
- Pooles Resort
- Poplar
- Poplar Dale
- Porcupine
- Port Albert
- Port Anson
- Port Bolster
- Port Britain
- Port Bruce
- Port Burwell
- Port Carling
- Port Carmen
- Port Credit
- Port Cunnington
- Port Davidson
- Port Dover
- Port Elgin
- Port Elmsley
- Porter's Hill
- Port Granby
- Port Law
- Port McNicoll
- Port Perry
- Port Rowan
- Port Ryerse
- Port Severn
- Port Stanley
- Port Sydney
- Portland
- Pottageville
- Potters Landing
- Powassan
- Powells Corners
- Precious Corners
- Preneveau
- Preston
- Prestonvale
- Priceville
- Primrose
- Princeton
- Prospect
- Proton Station
- Providence Bay
- Punkeydoodles Corners
- Purdy
- Purple Hill
- Purple Valley
- Purpleville
- Pusey

== Q ==
- Quabbin
- Quadeville
- Quantztown
- Quarindale
- Queens Line
- Queensborough
- Queensgate
- Queenston
- Queensville
- Queenswood Heights
- Quibell
- Quinn
- Quinn Settlement

== R ==
- Radiant
- Ragged Rapids
- Raglan, Chatham-Kent
- Raglan, Durham Regional Municipality
- Railton
- Rainham Centre
- Raith
- Rama
- Ramore
- Ramsayville
- Ramsey
- Randall
- Randwick
- Ranelagh
- Ranger Lake
- Rankin, Nipissing District
- Rankin, Renfrew County
- Rannoch
- Rathburn
- Ratho
- Rattlesnake Harbour
- Ratzburg
- Ravenna
- Ravenscliffe
- Ravenshoe
- Ravensview
- Ravenswood
- Ravensworth
- Raymond
- Raymonds Corners
- Rayside
- Rayside-Balfour
- Reaboro
- Read
- Reading
- Redan
- Red Bay
- Red Cap Beach
- Redickville
- Redwood
- Relessey
- Renfrew Junction
- Renton
- Restoule
- Rhineland
- Richard's Landing
- Richardson
- Richmond
- Rideau Ferry
- Ridgetown
- Ridgeville
- Ridgeway
- Rimington
- Ripley
- Ritchance
- Riverview
- Riverview Heights
- Riviera Estate
- Rivière-Veuve
- Robbtown
- Robertson's Shore
- Robin Landing
- Roches Point
- Rockcut
- Rockdale
- Rockfield
- Rockford
- Rockingham
- Rockland
- Rock Mills
- Rockport
- Rocksprings
- Rockwood
- Rocky Saugeen
- Rodney
- Roebuck
- Rolphton
- Ronaldson
- Rosebank
- Rosedale
- Rose Hill
- Rosemont
- Roseneath
- Rosetta
- Roslin
- Rossclair
- Rossport
- Rothwell's Shore
- Rush Point
- Ruskview
- Rutherford
- Rutherglen
- Ruthven
- Rutter
- Rydal Bank

== S ==
- Sable
- Sabourins Crossing
- Saganaga Lake
- Saginaw
- Sahanatien
- Saintfield
- Salem in Arran–Elderslie, Bruce County
- Salem in South Bruce, Bruce County
- Salem, Dufferin County
- Salem, Durham Regional Municipality
- Salem, Frontenac County
- Salem, Northumberland County
- Salem, Wellington County
- Salford
- Salisbury
- Salmon Point
- Salmonville
- Saltford
- Sam Lake
- Sandford
- Sand Banks
- Sand Bay Corner
- Sandcastle Beach
- Sandfield
- Sandringham
- Sandy Hill
- Sandy Lake
- Sans Souci
- Sarepta
- Sauble Beach
- Sauble Beach North
- Sauble Beach South
- Sauble Falls
- Saugeen
- Savanne
- Savant Lake
- Schipaville
- Scone
- Scotch Block
- Scotch Bush, Hastings County, Ontario
- Scotch Bush, Renfrew County, Ontario
- Scotch Corners
- Scotia
- Scotland
- Scugog
- Scugog Centre
- Schomberg
- Sebright
- Seagrave
- Seaforth
- Seeley
- Seeleys Bay
- Seguin
- Selby
- Selkirk
- Selton
- Senecal
- Seouls Corner
- Sesekinika
- Seven Mile Narrows
- Severn Bridge
- Severn Falls
- Shady Nook
- Shakespeare
- Shallow Lake
- Shamrock
- Shannon Hall
- Shannonville
- Shanty Bay
- Sharbot Lake
- Sharon
- Shebandowan
- Shebeshekong
- Shedden
- Sheffield
- Sherwood
- Sherwood Springs
- Shetland
- Shillington
- Shiloh
- Shouldice
- Shrigley
- Siberia
- Silver Creek
- Silver Dollar
- Silver Hill
- Simpson Corners
- Singhampton
- Sioux Narrows
- Skerryvore
- Skipness
- Slate Falls
- Sleeman
- Smithdale
- Smithville
- Snelgrove
- Snowball
- Snow Road Station
- Snug Harbour
- Snug Haven
- Sodom
- Sonya
- Soperton
- South Augusta
- South Beach
- South Branch
- Southcott Pines
- South Crosby
- South Dummer
- South March
- South Middleton
- South Monaghan
- South Wilberforce
- Southampton
- Sowerby
- Sparkle City
- Sparta
- Speedside
- Spence
- Speyside
- Spicer
- Spier
- Spring Bay
- Springbrook
- Springfield
- Springford
- Springhill
- Springmount
- Springvale
- Spring Valley
- Springville
- Squire
- Squirrel Town
- St. Agatha
- St. Albert
- St. Andrews
- St. Anns
- St. Augustine
- St. Bernardin
- St. Clair Beach
- St. Clements
- St. Cloud
- St. Columban
- St. David's, Niagara Regional Municipality
- St. Davids, Prescott and Russell United Counties
- St. Elmo, Muskoka District Municipality
- St. Elmo, Stormont, Dundas and Glengarry United Counties
- St. Eugene
- St. Felix
- St. George
- St. Helens
- St. Isidore
- St. Jacobs
- St. Joachim
- St. Johns, Brant County
- St. Johns, Niagara Regional Municipality
- St. Joseph, Huron County
- St. Joseph Island
- St. Ola
- St. Williams
- St. Pascal Baylon
- St. Pauls
- St. Pauls Station
- St. Raphaels
- St. Williams
- Stamford
- Stanleydale
- Stanton
- Stardale in Stormont, Dundas and Glengarry United Counties
- Stayner
- Ste-Anne-de-Prescott
- Stella
- Ste-Rose-de-Prescott
- Stevensville
- Stewarttown
- Stinson
- Stirling
- Stirling Falls
- Stittsville
- Stonebrook
- Stonecliffe
- Stonehart
- Stones Corners
- Stoney Creek
- Stoney Point
- Stories
- Storms Corners
- Stouffville
- Strange
- Strathavon
- Strathmore
- Strathroy
- Streetsville
- Stroud
- Sturgeon Falls
- Sturgeon Point
- Sulphide
- Summerhill
- Summers Corners
- Sunderland
- Sunfish Lake
- Sunnidale, Lambton County, Ontario
- Sunnidale, Simcoe County, Ontario
- Sunnidale Corners, Ontario
- Sunnidale Corners
- Sunny Slope
- Sunrise Beach
- Sunset Bay Estates
- Sunset Beach, several
- Sunset Corners
- Sutton
- Swan Crossing
- Swansea
- Swastika
- Sweets Corners, Haldimand County, Ontario
- Sweets Corners, Leeds and Grenville United Counties, Ontario
- Swindon
- Swinton Park
- Switzerville
- Sydenham, Frontenac County
- Sydenham, Grey County
- Sylvan Valley

== T ==
- Taits Beach
- Talbot
- Talbotville Royal
- Tamarack
- Tamworth
- Tanglewood Beach
- Tannery
- Tansley
- Tansleyville
- Tapley
- Tapleytown
- Tara
- Tarbert
- Tartan
- Tarzwell
- Tatlock
- Taunton
- Tavistock
- Taylor
- Taylorwoods
- Tayside
- Teeswater
- Teeterville
- Temperanceville
- Terra Cotta
- Terra Nova
- Thamesford
- Thamesville
- The Gully
- The Slash
- Thedford
- Tennyson
- Teston
- Thistle
- Thompson Hill
- Thorah Beach
- Thornbury
- Thorndale
- Thornhill
- Thorpe
- Throoptown
- Tichborne
- Tilbury
- Tilley
- Tincap
- Tintern
- Tiverton
- Toanche
- Tobacco Lake
- Tobermory
- Toledo
- Tolmie
- Tomelin Bluffs
- Topcliff
- Tormore
- Torrance
- Tory Hill
- Tottenham
- Townsend
- Tralee
- Tramore
- Traverston
- Treadwell
- Trenton
- Trent River
- Trevelyan
- Tullamore
- Turbine
- Turkey Point
- Turner
- Turtle Lake
- Tyrone

== U ==
- Udney
- Udora
- Uffington
- Ufford
- Uhthoff
- Ullswater
- Umfreville
- Underwood
- Uneeda
- Ungers Corners
- Union, Elgin County
- Union, Essex County
- Union, Leeds and Grenville United Counties
- Union Creek
- Union Hall
- Uniondale
- Unionville
- Uphill
- Uplands
- Upper
- Upper Paudash
- Upsala
- Uptergrove
- Ursa
- Utica
- Utopia
- Utterson
- Uttoxeter

== V ==
- Val Caron
- Val Côté
- Val Gagné
- Val Harbour
- Val Rita
- Val Thérèse
- Valens
- Valentia
- Vallentyne
- Van Allens
- Vandeleur
- Vanessa
- Vanier
- Vankleek Hill
- Vansickle
- Varney
- Vanzant's Point
- Vellore
- Vennachar
- Ventry
- Verner
- Verona
- Vermilion Bay
- Vernon Shores
- Vernonville
- Verulam Township
- Vesta
- Vickers
- Victoria Square
- Village Lanthier
- Vinegar Hill
- Vineland
- Violet
- Violet Hill
- Virginiatown
- Vittoria
- Vroomanton

== W ==
- Waba
- Wabigoon
- Wabos
- Wabozominissing
- Waddington Beach
- Wade's Landing
- Wagarville
- Wagram
- Wahawin
- Wahnapitae
- Wahnapitae First Nation
- Wahta Mohawk Territory
- Wahwashkesh Lake
- Waldau
- Waldemar
- Walden
- Walford
- Walker Woods
- Walkers
- Walkers Point
- Walkerton
- Walkerville
- Wallace, Nipissing District
- Wallace, Perth County
- Wallaceburg
- Wallace Point
- Wallbridge
- Wallenstein
- Walls
- Walnut
- Walpole Island
- Walsh
- Walsingham
- Walters Falls
- Walton
- Waneeta Beach
- Wanikewin
- Wanstead
- Wanup
- Warburton
- Ward
- Wardsville
- Wareham
- Warina
- Warings Corner
- Warkworth
- Warminster
- Warner
- Warren
- Warsaw
- Wartburg
- Washagami
- Washago
- Washburn
- Washburn Island
- Washburns Corners
- Washington
- Wasing
- Watercombe
- Waterdown
- Waterfall
- Waterford
- Waterton
- Watford
- Watsons
- Watsons Corners
- Wattenwyle
- Waterson Corners
- Waubamik
- Waubaushene
- Waubuno
- Waudby
- Waupoos
- Waupoos East
- Waupoos Island
- Wavecrest
- Wavell
- Waverley
- Waverley Beach
- Wayside
- Webbwood
- Webequie First Nation
- Welbeck
- Welcome
- Wellesley
- Wendake Beach
- Wendover
- Werner Lake
- Weslemkoon
- Wesley
- West Corners
- West Essa
- West Guilford
- West Huntingdon
- West Huntingdon Station
- West Lake
- West Lorne
- Westmeath
- Westminster, Middlesex County
- Westminster, Prescott and Russell United Counties
- West McGillivray
- West Montrose
- Westview
- Westwood
- Wharncliffe
- Wheatley
- Whitfield
- Whitney
- Whittington
- Wiarton
- Wick
- Wicklow
- Wilberforce
- Wilcox Corners
- Wildwood
- Wilfrid
- Wilkinson
- Williamsburg
- Williamsford
- Williamsport
- Williamstown
- Williscroft
- Willowbank
- Wilmot Creek
- Wilsonville
- Wilstead
- Wilton
- Winchester
- Windermere
- Windham Centre
- Winisk
- Winona
- Winslow
- Winterbourne
- Wisawasa
- Wodehouse
- Woito
- Wolftown
- Wolseley
- Woodbridge
- Woodington
- Woodrous
- Woods
- Woods Bay
- Woodslee
- Woodville
- Woodward Station
- Wooler
- Wrightmans Corners
- Wroxeter
- Wyebridge
- Wyecombe
- Wyevale
- Wyoming

== Y ==
- Yarker
- Yarmouth Centre
- Yatton
- Yearley
- Yellek
- Yelverton
- Yeovil
- Yerexville
- Yonge Mills
- York, Haldimand County
- Young's Cove
- Young's Point
- Youngstown
- Youngsville
- Yule

== Z ==
- Zadow
- Zealand
- Zenda
- Zephyr
- Zimmerman
- Zion, Ashfield-Colborne-Wawanosh, Huron County
- Zion, Grey County
- Zion, Kawartha Lakes
- Zion, Northumberland County
- Zion, Peterborough County
- Zion, South Huron, Huron County
- Zion Line
- Ziska
- Zorra Station
- Zuber Corners
- Zurich

== See also ==
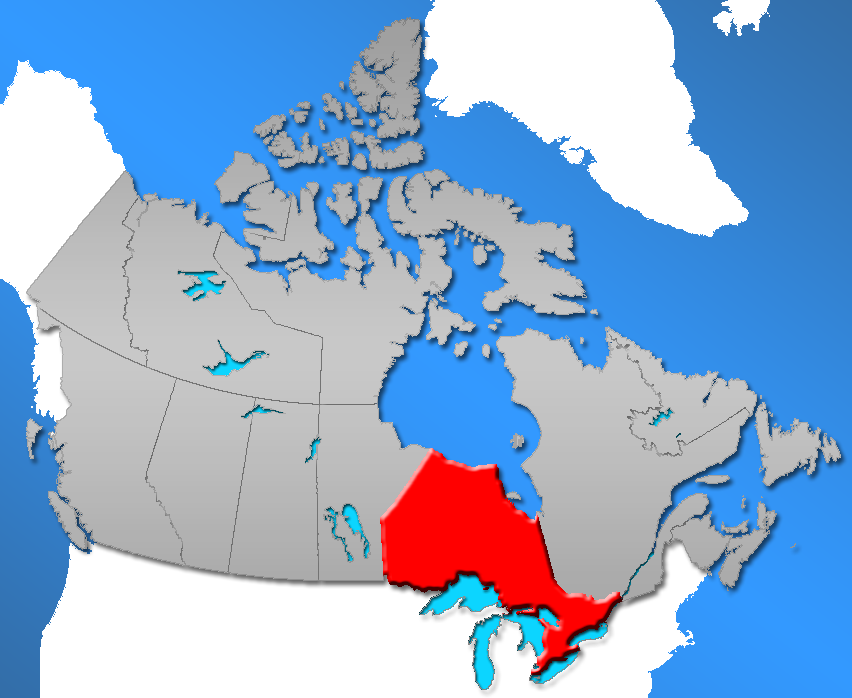
Communities in Canada's provinces and territories
- List of cities in Ontario
- List of municipalities in Ontario
- List of towns in Ontario
- List of township municipalities in Ontario
- List of villages in Ontario
