= Mount Pleasant, Ontario =

Mount Pleasant, Ontario may refer to:

- Mount Pleasant, Brampton, Ontario
- Mount Pleasant, Brant County, Ontario
- Mount Pleasant, Durham County, Ontario
- Mount Pleasant, Grey County, Ontario
- Mount Pleasant, Hastings County, Ontario
- Mount Pleasant, Lanark and Carleton County, Ontario
- Mount Pleasant, Lennox and Addington County, Ontario
- Mount Pleasant, Perth County, Ontario
- Mount Pleasant, Peterborough County, Ontario
- Mount Pleasant, Prince Edward District, Canada West (later Prince Edward County)
- Mount Pleasant, Waterloo County, Ontario
- Mount Pleasant, York Regional Municipality, Ontario (#1), within North Gwillimbury Township
- Mount Pleasant, York Regional Municipality, Ontario (#11), another name for Miles Hill, which is now part of Richmond Hill
- Mount Pleasant, York Regional Municipality, Ontario (#13)

In Toronto:

- Mount Pleasant Cemetery, Toronto, Ontario
  - Mount Pleasant Road, a street in Toronto, Ontario
