= Elizabethville =

Elizabethville or Elisabethville may refer to:

- Elisabethville, former name of Lubumbashi, Congo
- Elisabethville, a former village housing Belgians during World War I, within Birtley, Tyne and Wear
- SS Elisabethville, several steamships
- Elizabethville, Ontario, Canada
- Elizabethville, Pennsylvania, USA
