= Wellington North =

Wellington North may refer to:

In Canada

- Wellington North, Ontario, a township in Ontario
- Wellington North (Canadian electoral district)

In New Zealand

- Wellington North (New Zealand electorate)
