= Netherby =

Netherby may refer to:

== Places ==
- Netherby, Canterbury, a suburb in the town of Ashburton, New Zealand
- Netherby, Cumbria
- Netherby, Ontario
- Netherby, North Yorkshire
- Netherby, South Australia
- Netherby, Victoria, Australia

== Other uses ==
- Netherby (ship), wrecked on King Island, Tasmania in 1866
