= Balmy Beach =

Balmy Beach may refer to:

- Balmy Beach, an unincorporated community in the Township Georgian Bluffs, Ontario, Canada
- Balmy Beach, a former unincorporated community in Ontario, Canada, annexed by Toronto in 1909
- Balmy Beach, a beach on Lake Ontario in The Beaches neighbourhood of Toronto, Canada
- Toronto Balmy Beach Beachers, a former Ontario Rugby Football Union team in Toronto, Canada
