= Old Cut =

Old Cut may refer to:

- Old Cut water channel
- Old Cut, Ontario, place
