= Pottawatomi River =

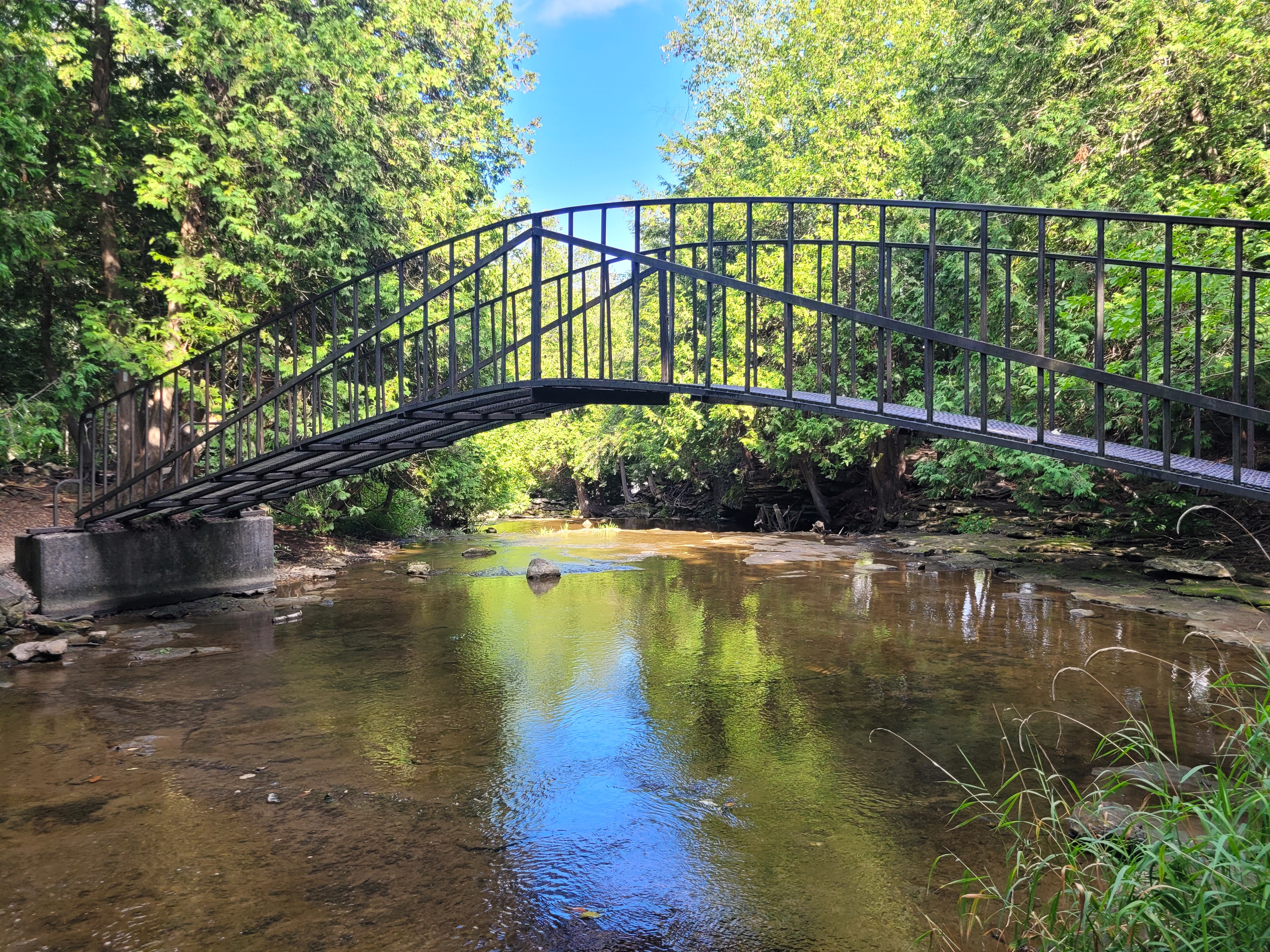

- Location of the mouth of the Pottawatomi River in southern Ontario

Location
- Country: Canada
- Province: Ontario
- Region: Southwestern Ontario
- County: Grey
- Municipalities: Owen Sound; Georgian Bluffs

Physical characteristics
- Source: Field
  - location: Georgian Bluffs
  - coordinates: 44°31′12″N 81°05′02″W
  - elevation: 250 m (820 ft)
- Mouth: Georgian Bay
  - location: Owen Sound
  - coordinates: 44°34′41″N 80°56′42″W
  - elevation: 176 m (577 ft)

Basin features
- River system: Great Lakes Basin
- Tributaries
  - right: Maxwell Creek

The Pottawatomi River is a river in the municipalities of Owen Sound and Georgian Bluffs, Grey County in Southwestern Ontario, Canada. It is in the Great Lakes Basin and empties into Owen Sound, an inlet of Georgian Bay on Lake Huron, at Owen Sound Harbour.

== Course ==
The river begins in a field in geographic Derby Township in Georgian Bluffs. It flows southeast, then turns northeast for the remainder of its course. It passes under Ontario Highway 21 at the community of Springmount, and passes over the Niagara Escarpment at Jones Falls. The river then takes in the right tributary Maxwell Creek, enters the municipality of Owen Sound, and reaches its mouth at Georgian Bay.

== Tributaries ==
- Maxwell Creek (right)

== See also ==
- List of rivers of Ontario
