= Raglan, Ontario =

Raglan may refer to the following communities in Ontario, Canada:

- Raglan, Chatham-Kent, Ontario
- Raglan, Durham Regional Municipality, Ontario
