= Riverstown (disambiguation) =

Riverstown is a village in County Sligo, Ireland

Riverstown may also refer to:

Canada

- Riverstown, Ontario

Republic of Ireland

- Riverstown (near Birr), a village on the County Offaly/County Tipperary border

== See also ==
- Riverstown Demesne, an 18th-century house near Glanmire in County Cork, Ireland
