= Maxwell Creek (Grey County) =

- Location of the mouth of Maxwell Creek in Southern Ontario

Location
- Country: Canada
- Province: Ontario
- Region: Southwestern Ontario
- County: Grey
- Municipality: Georgian Bluffs

Physical characteristics
- Source: Confluence of two unnamed streams
  - coordinates: 44°33′34″N 80°58′41″W
  - elevation: 256 m (840 ft)
- Mouth: Pottawatomi River
  - coordinates: 44°33′34″N 80°58′41″W
  - elevation: 207 m (679 ft)

Basin features
- River system: Great Lakes Basin

Maxwell Creek is a stream in the municipality of Georgian Bluffs, Grey County in Southwestern Ontario, Canada. It is in geographic Derby Township, is part of the Great Lakes Basin and is a right tributary of the Pottawatomi River.

The creek begins at the confluence of two unnamed streams at an elevation of 256 metres (840 ft), southeast of the settlement of Squire. It flows north, drops over the Niagara Escarpment, passes under Ontario Highway 21, and reaches its mouth at the Pottawatomi River at an elevation of 207 metres (679 ft), west of Owen Sound and east of the settlement of Springmount. The Pottawatomi River flows to Georgian Bay on Lake Huron.
