= Kilsyth (disambiguation) =

There are several places named Kilsyth:

- Kilsyth, Scotland
- Kilsyth, a suburb of Melbourne, Victoria, Australia
- Electoral district of Kilsyth, a former electoral district in Victoria, Australia
- Kilsyth, Ontario in Canada

There are also 2 towns named Kilsyth in the United States.

- Kilsyth, West Virginia
- Kilsyth, Tennessee
