= Petherton, Ontario =

Petherton
- Unincorporated rural community
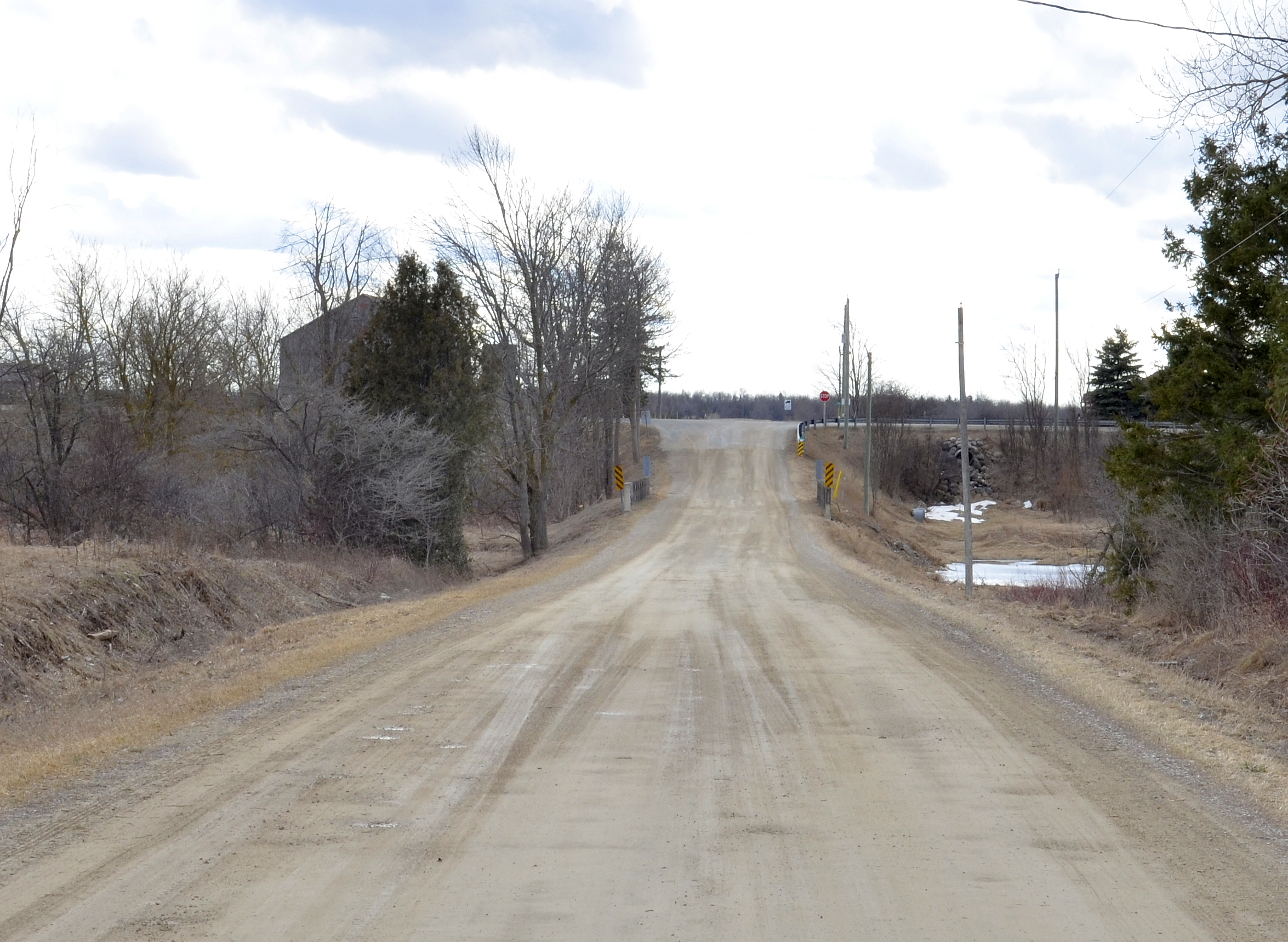
- Looking southwest over Four Mile Creek towards Highway 6 in Petherton

- Location within Canada Location within Ontario
- Coordinates: 43°52′07″N 80°35′43″W
- Country: Canada
- Province: Ontario
- County: Wellington
- Township: Wellington North

Government
- Time zone: UTC-5 (Eastern (EST))
  - Summer (DST): UTC-4 (EDT)
- GNBC Code: FDOWL

Petherton is an unincorporated rural community in Wellington North Township, Wellington County, Ontario, Canada. Petherton was located in Arthur Township until 1999.

The settlement is located along Highway 6, 6.4 km (4.0 mi) northwest of Arthur.

Little remains of the once thriving community.

== History ==
When several Baptist families in the area constructed a log church and cemetery there, Petherton was founded in 1860. Known as the South Arthur Baptist Church and the Petherton Pioneer Cemetery, they were built on land donated by the Spark family. The church was dismantled in 1892 after a new church was built in nearby Kenilworth.

A post office was established in 1869, and by the 1870s Petherton was a thriving agricultural centre, with two stores, two carriage makers, two hotels, two blacksmith shops, a carpenter, a chopping mill, a kiln for making bricks, and several houses. The population was 155.

The Toronto, Grey and Bruce Railway established a line through Petherton in 1872, and a station was erected there. The railway has since been abandoned and the tracks removed.

=== Decline ===
The post office closed in 1915.

The cemetery fell into neglect, and was restored in 1977 by descendants of the pioneers buried there. Surviving grave markers were cemented into a cairn, and a historic plaque was placed there.
