= Spicer, Ontario =

Coordinates: 43.9649°N 78.1032°W

Location of Spicer in Ontario

Spicer is a community in Ontario. It is a small church-run community, also known as Lakeshore Pentecostal Camp.

Its primary function is as a summer/seasonal camp/retreat established by the Pentecostal Church. The camp is administered by a Camp Director and a Camp Committee who operate under the authority of the District Executive and District Conference of Eastern Ontario. The camp/retreat caters to Bible studies, life skills, family values, fitness and well being, for children of all ages, and it offers full family retreat opportunities as well.

The community landmass is about 2 km^{2} is size and located on the north shore of Lake Ontario approximately 5 km east of its neighbouring city of Cobourg, Ontario. Statistics on permanent population vary in size ranging from up to 50 people in the off-season and in peak months of April to October figures increase to nearly 1,000 people.
