= Carling, Ontario =

Carling
- Township (single-tier)
- Township of Carling
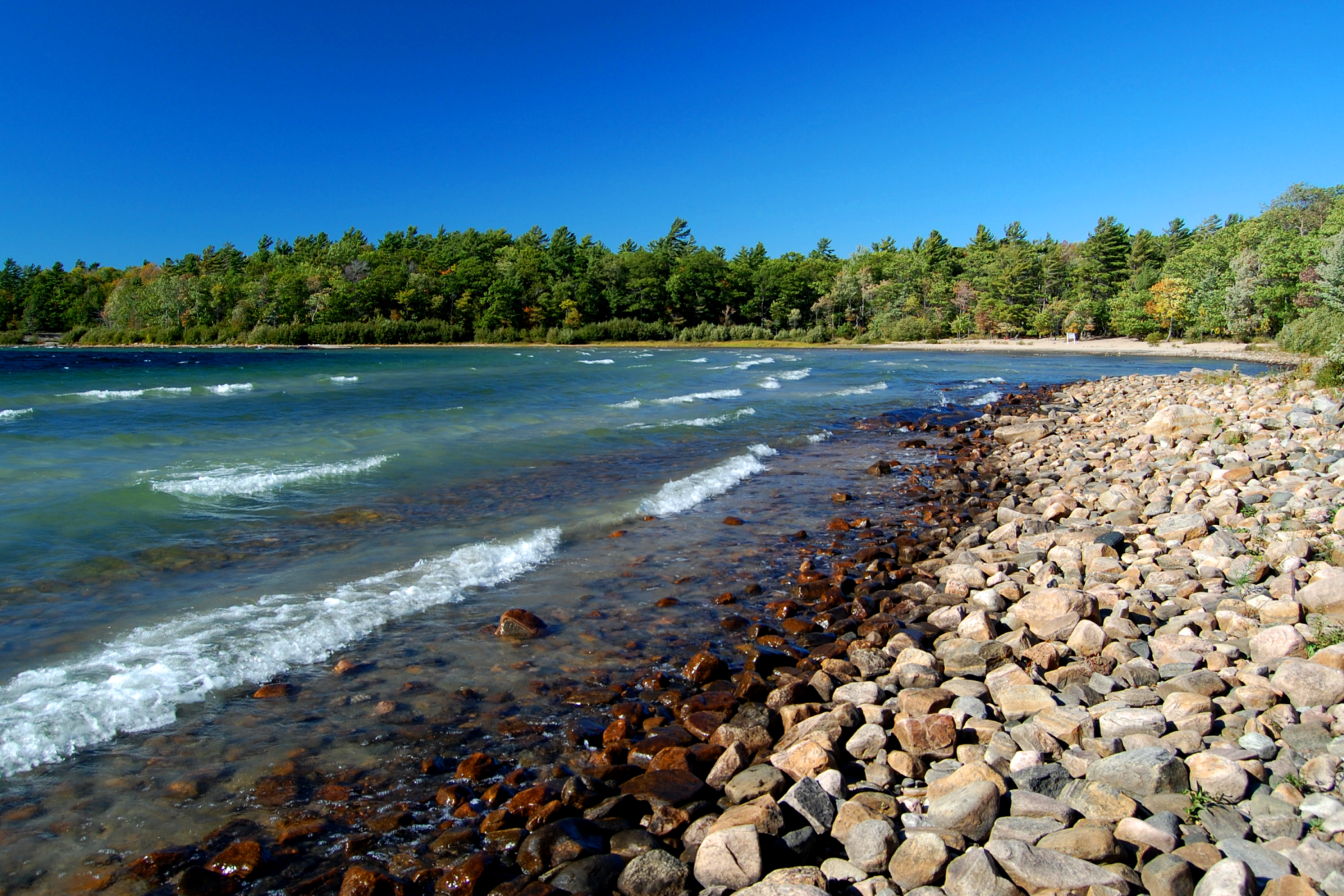
- Killbear Provincial Park

- Location within Southern Ontario
- Coordinates: 45°26′N 80°13′W
- Country: Canada
- Province: Ontario
- District: Parry Sound
- Incorporated: 1897

Government
  - Type: Township
  - Mayor: Susan Murphy
  - Fed. riding: Parry Sound-Muskoka
  - Prov. riding: Parry Sound—Muskoka

Area
  - Land: 244.32 km^{2} (94.33 sq mi)

Population (2021)
  - Total: 1,491
  - Density: 6.1/km^{2} (16/sq mi)
- Time zone: UTC-5 (EST)
  - Summer (DST): UTC-4 (EDT)
- Postal Code: P0G
- Area codes: 705, 249
- Website: carling.ca

Carling is a township in Ontario, Canada, located in Parry Sound District on Georgian Bay. Killbear Provincial Park is located in the municipality.

The CBC Television series The Rez was shot in the township at Harrison Landing.

== Communities ==
- Adanac
- Brooks Landing
- Carling
- Dillon is located on central Georgian Bay near Franklin Island. The area is popular for campers and outfitters because of the sheltered bays and coves. Community landmarks include the Dillon Cove Marina, Dillon Bridge, Shawanaga River and its rapids. As a cottage destination, the population is low during the winter months, and increases in the summer with cottagers and tourists.
- Killbear Park
- Shebeshekong
- Snug Harbour
- Snug Haven
- Woods

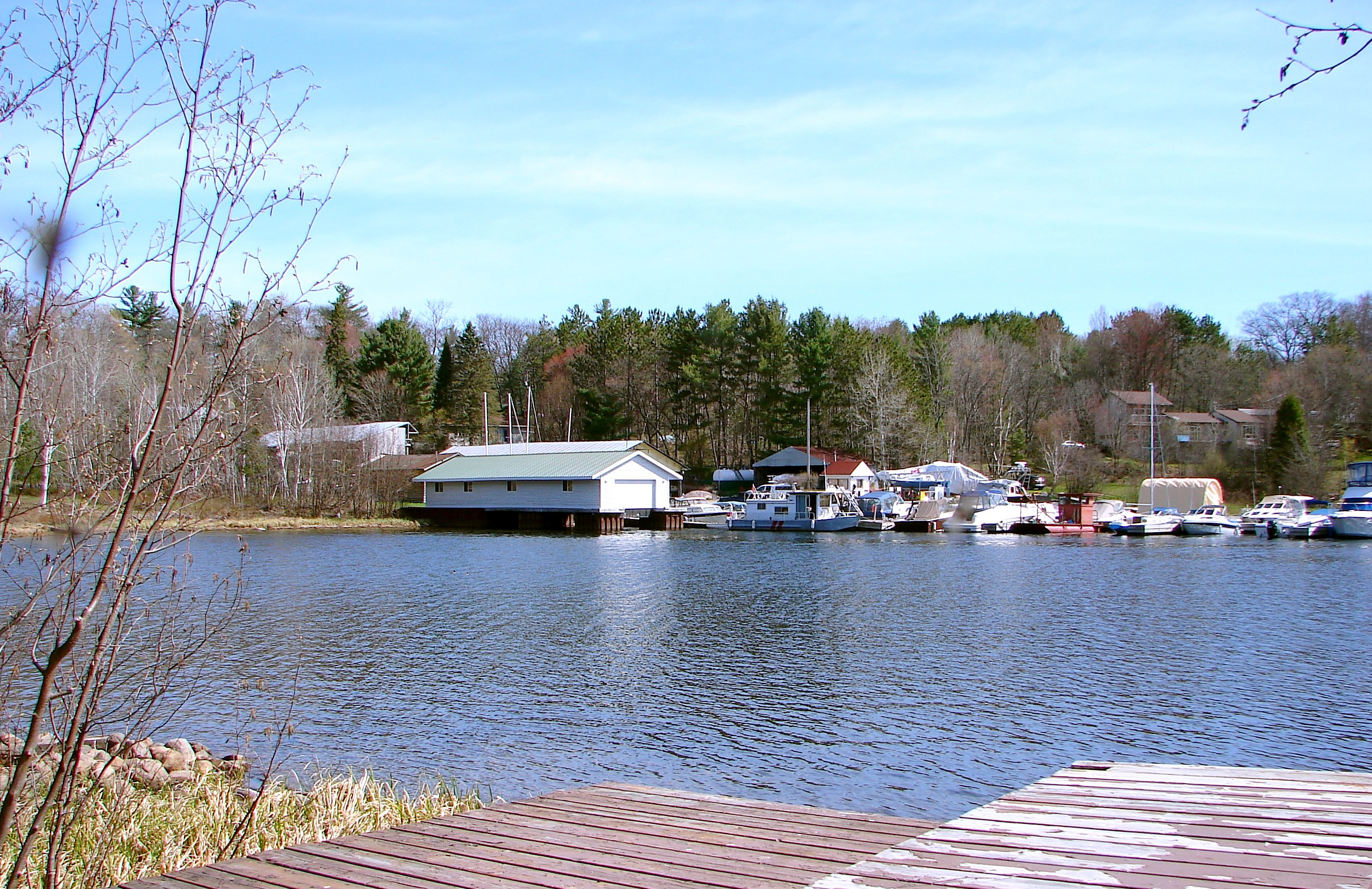
Marina on Carling Bay

== History ==
The township was first surveyed in 1873 and named after John Carling. In 1897, the Township of Carling was incorporated, with David McFarland as its first reeve.

== Demographics ==
In the 2021 Census of Population conducted by Statistics Canada, Carling had a population of 1,491 living in 697 of its 1,761 total private dwellings, a change of 32.5% from its 2016 population of 1,125. With a land area of 244.32 km^{2} (94.33 sq mi), it had a population density of 6.1/km^{2} (15.8/sq mi) in 2021.

Canada census – Carling community profile

	2021	2016	2011
Population	1,491 (+32.5% from 2016)	1,125 (-9.9% from 2011)	1,248 (+11.1% from 2006)
Land area	244.32 km^{2} (94.33 sq mi)	248.85 km^{2} (96.08 sq mi)	248.56 km^{2} (95.97 sq mi)
Population density	6.1/km^{2} (16/sq mi)	4.5/km^{2} (12/sq mi)	5.0/km^{2} (13/sq mi)
Median age	58.0 (M: 58.0, F: 58.0)	56.0 (M: 56.2, F: 55.8)
Private dwellings	1,761 (total) 697 (occupied)	2,283 (total)	1,543 (total)
Median household income	$84,000	$73,173

References: 2021 2016 2011

Historical census populations – Carling Township

Year	Pop.	±%
1881	472	—
1891	481	+1.9%
1901	377	−21.6%
1911	361	−4.2%
1921	402	+11.4%
1931	297	−26.1%
1941	432	+45.5%
1951	254	−41.2%

Year	Pop.	±%
1956	297	+16.9%
1961	369	+24.2%
1966	397	+7.6%
1971	497	+25.2%
1976	672	+35.2%
1981	813	+21.0%
1986	859	+5.7%
1991	951	+10.7%

Year	Pop.	±%
1996	952	+0.1%
2001	1,063	+11.7%
2006	1,123	+5.6%
2011	1,248	+11.1%
2016	1,125	−9.9%
2021	1,491	+32.5%

Source: Statistics Canada

Mother tongue (2021):

- English as first language: 88.6%
- French as first language: 0.7%
- English and French as first languages: 0.7%
- Other as first language: 9.1%

== See also ==
- List of townships in Ontario
