= Purpleville, Ontario =

Coordinates: 43.856281°N 79.589655°W

Purpleville is a hamlet located south of the intersection of Pine Valley Drive and Teston Road, in the city of Vaughan, in Ontario, Canada.

In 2017 the city approved a subdivision on the site of this hamlet.

The historic hamlet of Purpleville is located at the intersection of Pine Valley Drive and Teston Road. There are two cemeteries and several single detached dwellings that exist on the subject lands that will either be moved or demolished.

Almost unrecognizable because of its small size, the only remnants of Purpleville are at Hadwin Chapel and Pioneer Cemetery with a small historical plaque, and a cemetery containing the very few settlers that lived there.

As with other hamlets in Ontario, its growing surroundings has led to its incorporation into the larger city of Vaughan.
