= Mabee's Corners =

Community in Norfolk County, in Southwestern Ontario, Canada

Coordinates: 42.779°N 80.680°W

Location of Mabee's Corners in Ontario

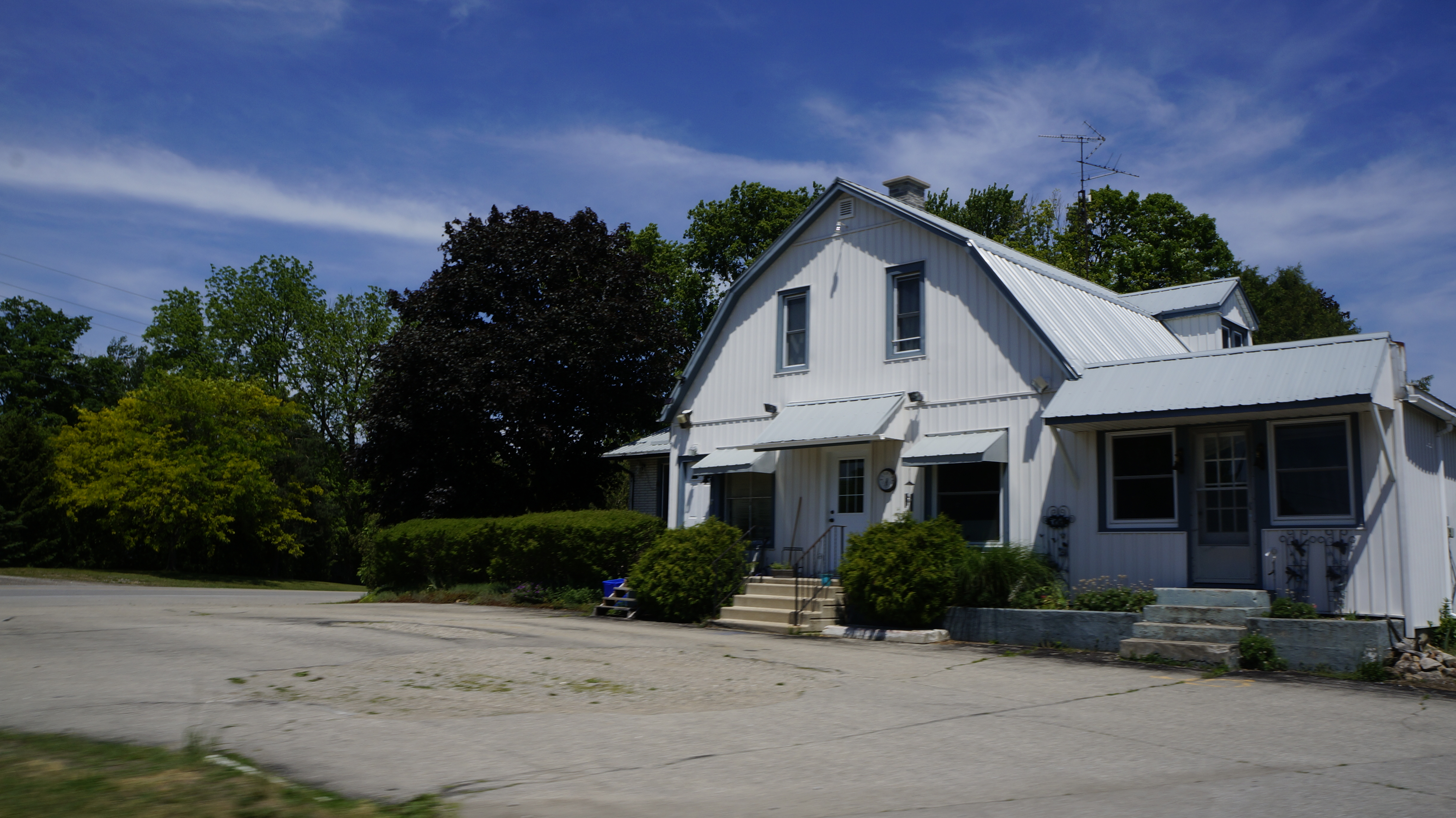
Street view of Mabee's Corners

Mabee's Corners is a community in Norfolk County, in Southwestern Ontario, Canada.
