= List of ships named Elisabethville =

Elisabethville or Élisabethville may refer to ships formerly operated by the Compagnie Belge Maritime du Congo and Compagnie Maritime Belge:

Scale model of SS Elisabethville (1921)

Drawing of MV Elisabethville (1949)

- SS Elisabethville (1910), launched in 1910 and operated to 1917 when it was sunk by a German U-boat SM UC-71.
- SS Elisabethville (1921), operated from 1921 to 1947. Then sold and renamed to Empire Bure, in 1950 to Charlton Star, in 1959 to Maristrella. Scrapped in 1960.
- MV Elisabethville, launched in 1949, gutted by fire in 1968 and scrapped in 1969.
