= Joyceville, Ontario =

Joyceville
- Location within Ontario
- Coordinates: 44°14′N 76°30′W
- Country: Canada
- Province: Ontario
- County: Frontenac

Government
  - MPs: Mark Gerretsen (LPC)
  - MPPs: Sophie Kiwala (OLP)
- Elevation: 70–110 m (230–360 ft)

Population (2001)
  - Total: 2,095
- source: City of Kingston
- Time zone: UTC−5 (Eastern (EST))
  - Summer (DST): UTC−4 (Eastern (EDT))
- Postal code span: K7L 4X9
- Area code: 613
- WWW.CSC-SCC.gc.ca

Joyceville is a community in Ontario, located within the rural part of Kingston.
