= Paget, Ontario =

Coordinates: 46.236°N 80.728°W

Location of Paget in Ontario

Paget is a rural community in Ontario. It is unincorporated, and is situated to the east of Lovering Lake.
