= Sunset Beach, Ontario =

There are four communities named Sunset Beach in the Canadian province of Ontario. Each is located in a different municipality:

- Amherstburg
- Ashfield–Colborne–Wawanosh
- Muskoka Lakes
- Tay
