= Blue Springs, Ontario =

Blue Springs
- Unincorporated community
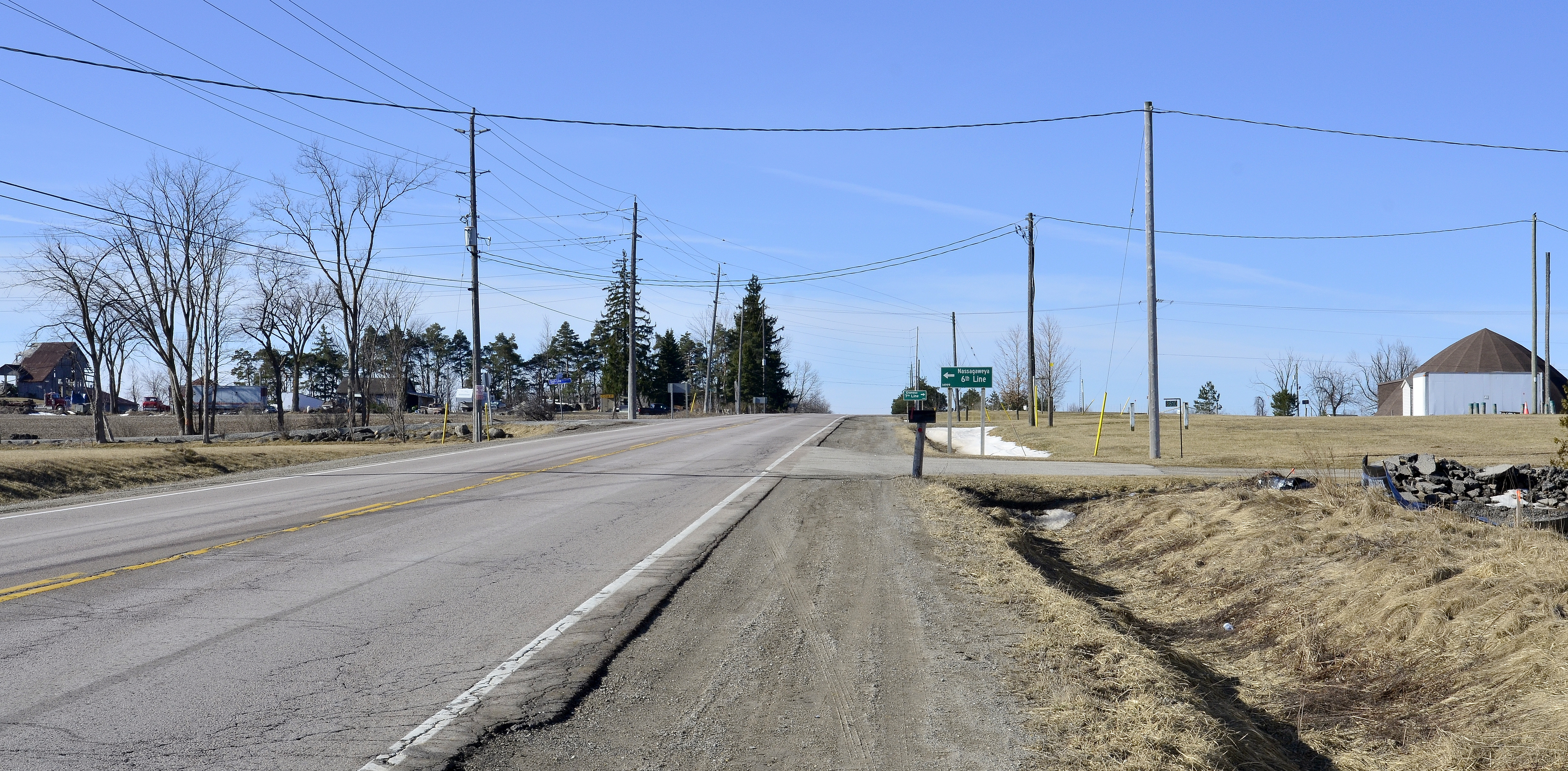
- Looking west on Highway 7 in Blue Springs

- Location of Blue Springs Blue Springs (Southern Ontario)
- Coordinates: 43°37′07″N 80°05′48″W
- Country: Canada
- Province: Ontario
- Regional municipality: Halton
- Town: Milton
- Time zone: UTC-5 (Eastern (EST))
  - Summer (DST): UTC-4 (EDT)
- GNBC Code: FAKGG

Blue Springs is an unincorporated community in Milton, Ontario, Canada.

Blue Springs Creek flows south of the settlement.
