= Onyotaa:ka First Nation =

- First Nation
- Oneida Nation of the Thames
- Interactive map of Onyotaa:ka First Nation
- Coordinates: 42.833°N 81.412°W
- Country: Canada
- Province: Ontario
- Website: oneida.on.ca

Location of Onyotaa:ka First Nation in Ontario

Onyotaa:ka First Nation is a First Nations band government in Ontario. It is also known as the Oneida Nation of the Thames.
