= Port Britain, Ontario =

Port Britain
- Dispersed rural community
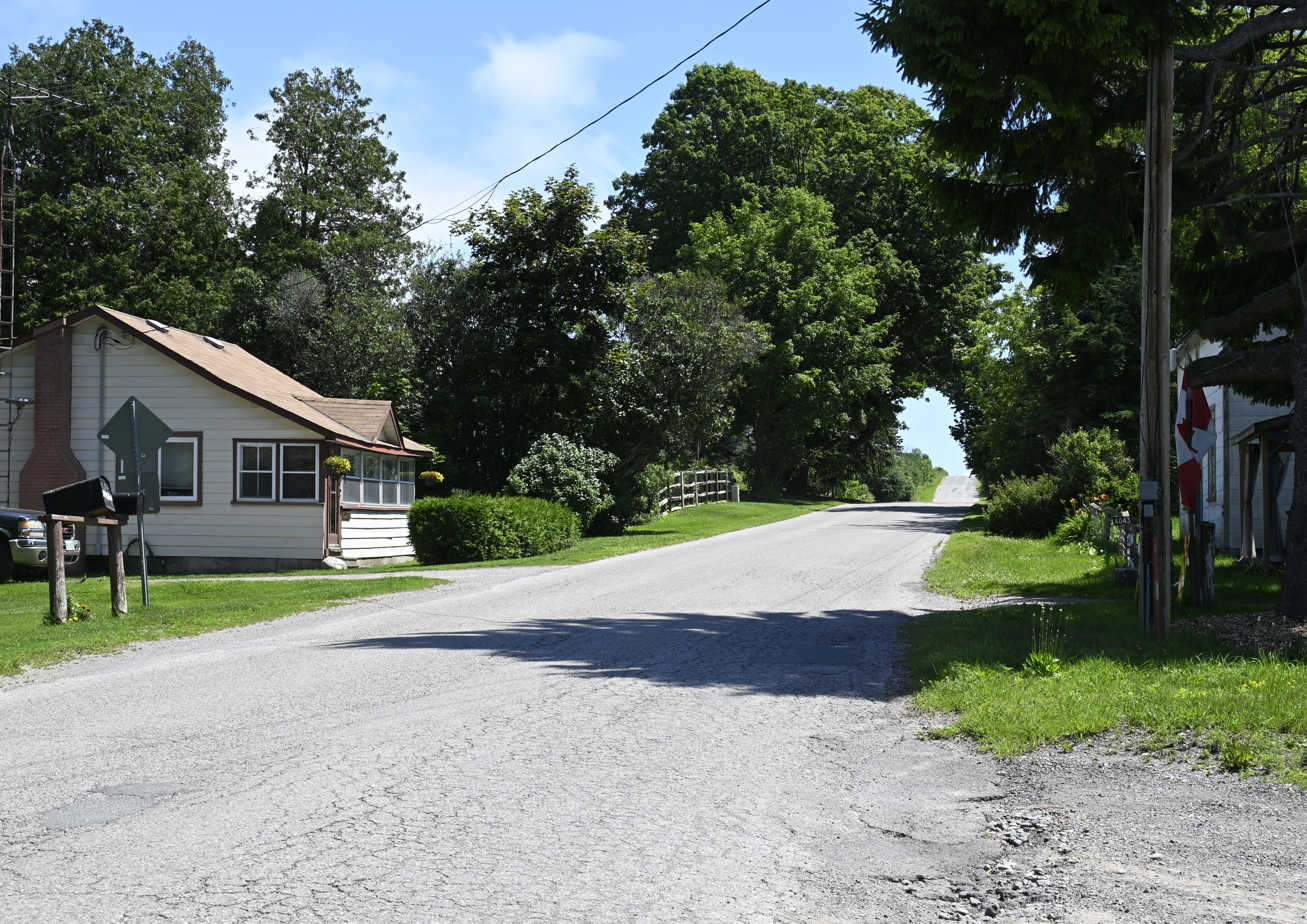
- Lakeshore Road in Port Britain

- Location within Southern Ontario
- Coordinates: 43°56′09″N 78°21′56″W
- Country: Canada
- Province: Ontario
- County: Northumberland
- Municipality: Port Hope
- Time zone: UTC-5 (Eastern (EST))
  - Summer (DST): UTC-4 (EDT)
- Postal code FSA: L1A
- Area codes: 905, 289
- GNBC Code: FCHYI

Port Britain is a dispersed rural community in Port Hope, Northumberland County, Ontario, Canada.

== History ==
William March, a Loyalist, obtained a land grant for a large part of Hope Township in the 1700s, and named the wetland located here "Marsh's Creek". Early settlers from Pennsylvania arrived at Marsh's Creek in the late 1700s, and renamed the settlement Port Britain. A grist mill was built in 1798.

During the War of 1812, British soldiers travelling to and from York boarded at Marsh's Inn in Port Britain, and in 1813, Sir Gordon Drummond, the newly arrived Lieutenant Governor of Ontario, took a wrong turn in the road while travelling to York, and spent the night at a farmhouse in Port Britain. Officers accompanying Drummond were given beds in the house, and his cavalry escort slept in the barn.

A harbour was constructed in 1840, a brick church was erected in 1851, and a wharf was built in 1853.

The early settlement had a raft and shipbuilding industry, and the Grand Trunk Railway built a station next to the harbour. The first locomotives used on the Grand Trunk were unloaded from ships at Port Britain, and rolling stock and rails for various Upper Canada railways arrived by ship at Port Britain. At its peak, over two hundred masts per year were exported from Port Britain for the Royal Navy.

In 1857, the population was about 350, and included a teacher, veterinary surgeon, postmaster, hotelkeeper, wagonmaker and blacksmith, store and grist mill proprietor, and lumber merchant and ship builder.

One historian wrote:

Where a dynasty routed in British connections, rose, flourished, built its family seats, furnished them with pianos, built by their own imported workmen, launched fleets of schooners and sent them to sea, and they faded, leaving to the lonesome lake gulls the remnants of the greatness of Marsh Creek and Port Britain.
