= Old Woman's River, Ontario =

Old Woman's River
- Community
- Location within Ontario
- Coordinates: 44°58′02″N 81°21′11″W
- Country: Canada
- Province: Ontario
- Region: Southwestern Ontario
- County: Bruce
- Time zone: UTC−5 (EST)
  - Summer (DST): UTC−4 (EDT)
- Area codes: 519 and 226

Old Woman's River is a community the Canadian province of Ontario, located in Bruce County. It is located on the Bruce Peninsula in Southwestern Ontario.
