= Dawn-Euphemia =

- Township (lower-tier)
- Township of Dawn-Euphemia
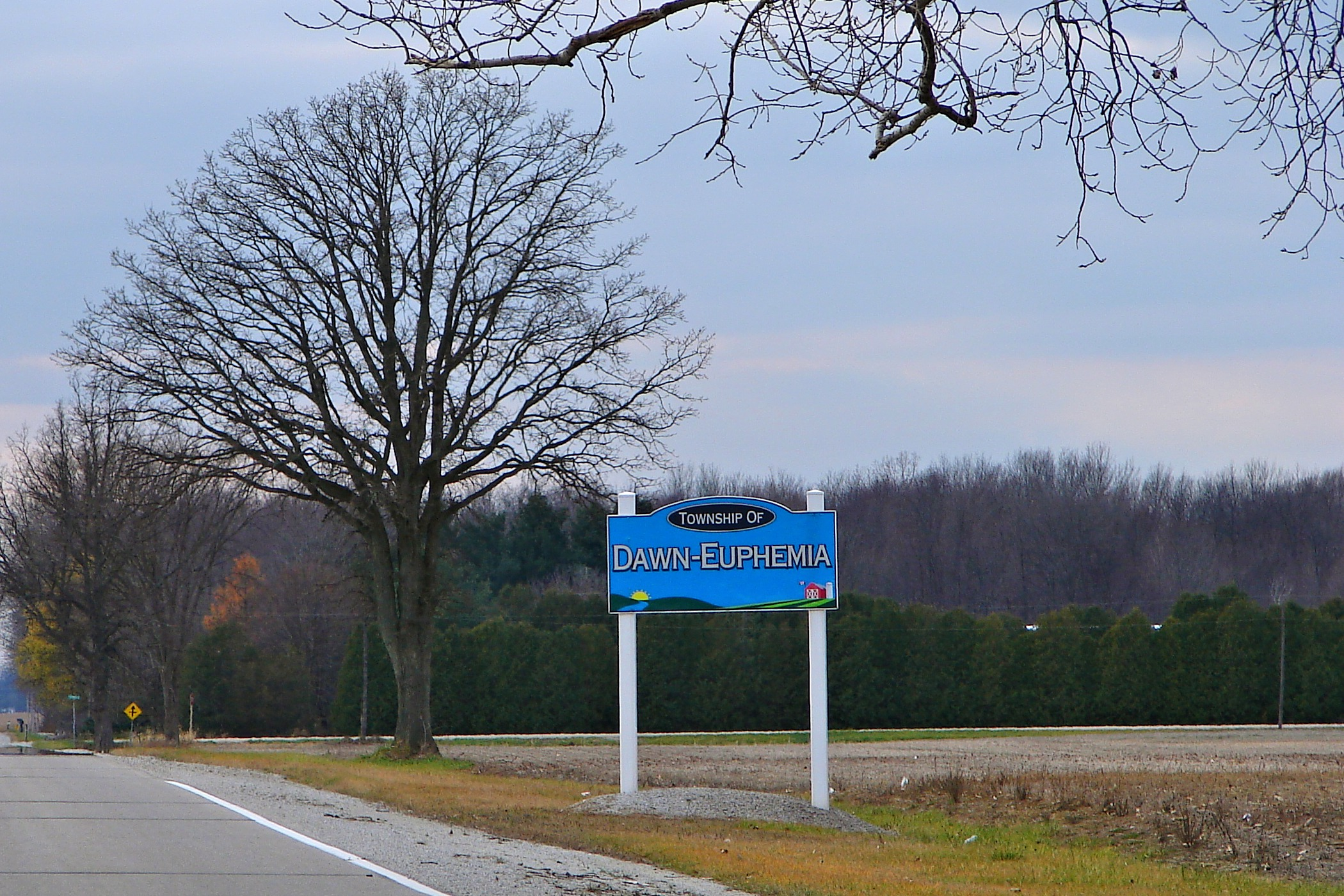

- Location within Lambton County Location within Southern Ontario
- Coordinates: 42°42′N 82°01′W
- Country: Canada
- Province: Ontario
- County: Lambton
- Formed: 2001

Government
  - Mayor: Alan Broad
  - Federal riding: Sarnia—Lambton—Bkejwanong
  - Prov. riding: Lambton—Kent—Middlesex

Area
  - Land: 445.12 km^{2} (171.86 sq mi)

Population (2016)
  - Total: 1,967
  - Density: 4.4/km^{2} (11/sq mi)
- Time zone: UTC-5 (EST)
  - Summer (DST): UTC-4 (EDT)
- Postal Code: N0N
- Area codes: 519, 226, 548
- Website: www.dawneuphemia.ca

Dawn-Euphemia is a township in southwestern Ontario, Canada, in Lambton County. Residents primarily are employed by the agricultural industry, or by local industries such as Union Gas distribution centre, along with various smaller agricultural manufacturers or service providers. The township municipal office is located in Rutherford.

Major transportation routes include Cairo Road and Oil Heritage Road directed north–south, and Bentpath Line and Lambton Line running east–west. One elementary school serves the area, Dawn-Euphemia School. Students attend secondary school in nearby Petrolia and Dresden, both of which serve as local service centres for residents.

== Communities ==
The township comprises the communities of Aberfeldy, Aughrim, Beaver Meadow, Bentpath, Cairo, Cuthbert, Dawn, Dawn Valley, Edys Mills, Florence, Garville, Huffs Corners, Langbank, Oakdale, Rutherford and Shetland.

== History ==
The Western Ontario Pacific Railway was constructed through the southeastern corner of the township in 1890. The Western Ontario Pacific was an arm's length subsidiary of the Canadian Pacific Railway, which sought to connect its railway empire directly to Windsor and Detroit, rather than through the American-owned Canada Southern Railway at St. Thomas. The Township of Dawn-Euphemia was formed in 2001 from a merger of the Township of Dawn, and Township of Euphemia.

== Demographics ==
In the 2021 Census of Population conducted by Statistics Canada, Dawn-Euphemia had a population of 1,968 living in 766 of its 824 total private dwellings, a change of 0.1% from its 2016 population of 1,967. With a land area of 445.14 km^{2} (171.87 sq mi), it had a population density of 4.4/km^{2} (11.5/sq mi) in 2021.

Canada census – Dawn-Euphemia community profile

	2021	2016	2011
Population	1,968 (+0.1% from 2016)	1,967 (-4.0% from 2011)	2,049 (-6.4% from 2006)
Land area	445.14 km^{2} (171.87 sq mi)	445.12 km^{2} (171.86 sq mi)	445.13 km^{2} (171.87 sq mi)
Population density	4.4/km^{2} (11/sq mi)	4.4/km^{2} (11/sq mi)	4.6/km^{2} (12/sq mi)
Median age	43.6 (M: 42.8, F: 44.8)	43.4 (M: 42.8, F: 44.1)	43.1 (M: 42.2, F: 44.1)
Private dwellings	824 (total) 766 (occupied)	843 (total)	866 (total)
Median household income	$83,000	$70,571

References: 2021 2016 2011

Historical population
Year	Pop.	±%
1996	2,577	—
2001	2,369	−8.1%
2006	2,190	−7.6%
2011	2,049	−6.4%
2016	1,967	−4.0%

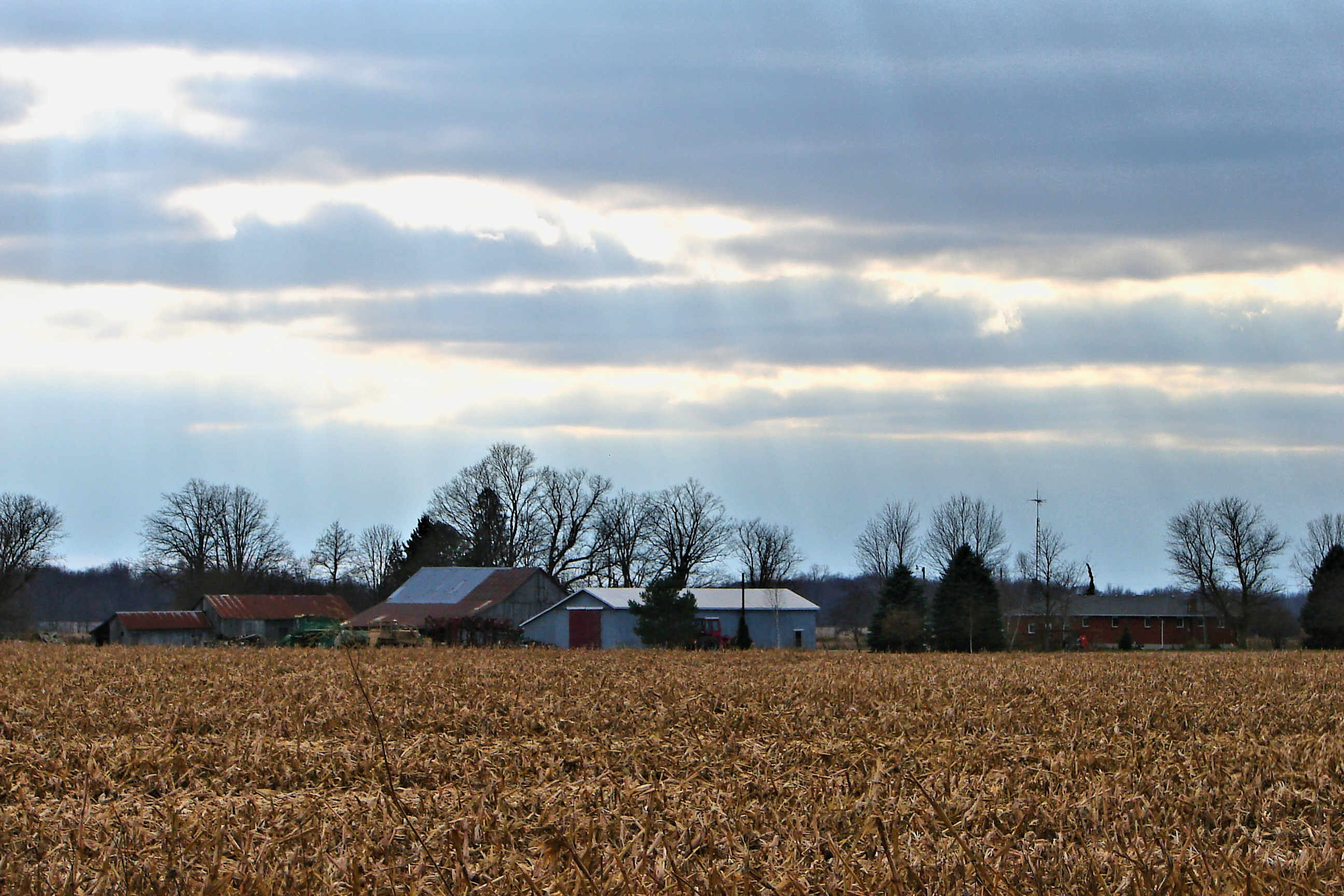
Rural countryside of Dawn-Euphemia

== See also ==
- List of townships in Ontario
