= Ravensview =

Community in Ontario, Canada

Coordinates: 44.243°N 76.423°W

Location of Ravensview in Ontario

Ravensview is a rural community within the greater city of Kingston, Ontario, Canada. It is located east of the urbanized part of the city along old Highway 2. To the west of the community is CFB Kingston, and to the south is the St. Lawrence River.
