= Riverstown, Ontario =

Riverstown
- Unincorporated rural community
- Location within Canada Location within Ontario
- Coordinates: 43°55′30″N 80°40′14″W
- Country: Canada
- Province: Ontario
- County: Wellington
- Township: Wellington North, Ontario
- Time zone: UTC-5 (Eastern (EST))
  - Summer (DST): UTC-4 (EDT)
- GNBC Code: FENIN

Riverstown is an unincorporated rural community in Wellington North township, Wellington County, Ontario, Canada. Before 1999, Riverstown was located in Arthur Township.

The Riverstown Waste Facility, operated by the County of Wellington, is located at the settlement.

== History ==
The Church of the Good Shepherd was established in Riverstown in 1886, and a cemetery was located nearby. In 1958, the cemetery's grave markers were placed together for display in a cement base. The church closed in 1964 and was demolished; a cairn now marks its former location next to the extant cemetery.

A post office was located in Riverstown from 1869 to 1915.

The Toronto, Grey and Bruce Railway established a line through Riverstown in 1872, and a station was located there. The railway has since been abandoned and the tracks removed.

By 1910, Riverstown had a shoemaker and general store, and a population of about 100.

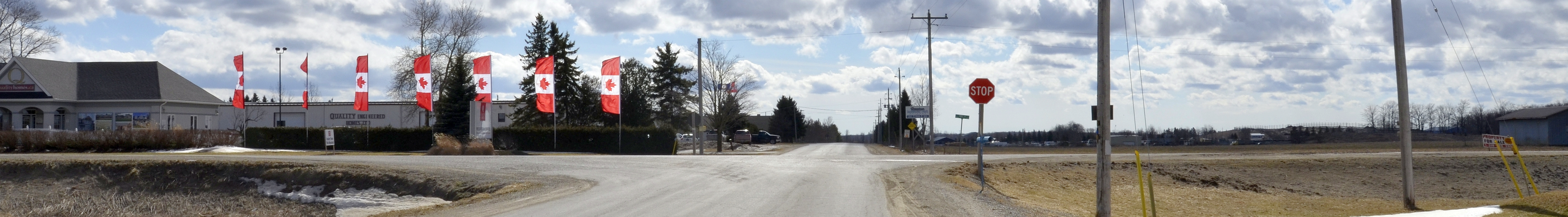
Riverstown
