= Mount Pleasant, Brampton =

Mount Pleasant
- Neighbourhood
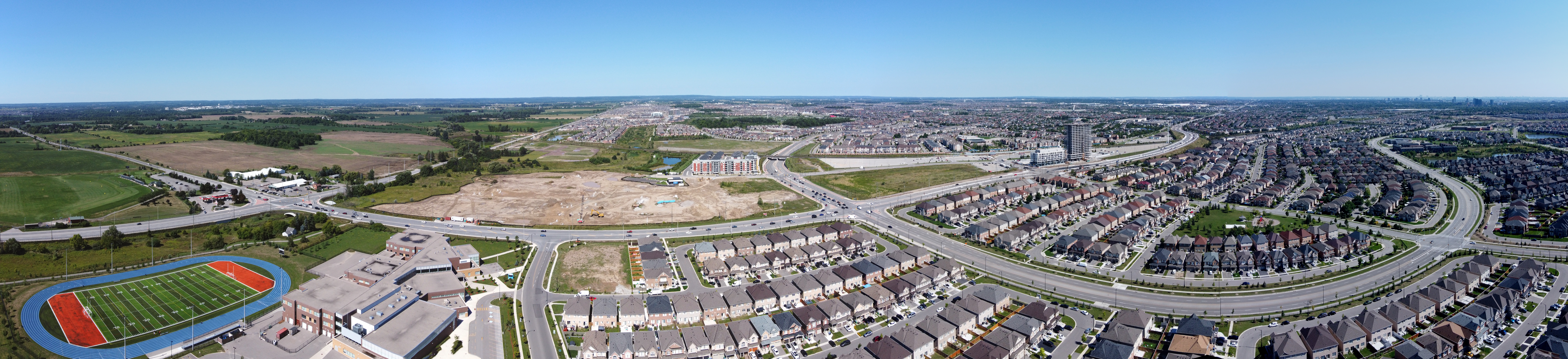
- Aerial view of Mount Pleasant, Brampton (2022)
- Interactive map of Mount Pleasant
- Coordinates: 43°40′36″N 79°49′7″W
- Country: Canada
- Province: Ontario
- Regional municipality: Peel
- City: Brampton

Area
  - Total: 10.0 km^{2} (3.9 sq mi)

Population (2021)
  - Total: 53,640
- Forward sortation area: L7A
- NTS Map: 030M12
- GNBC Code: FCFBM

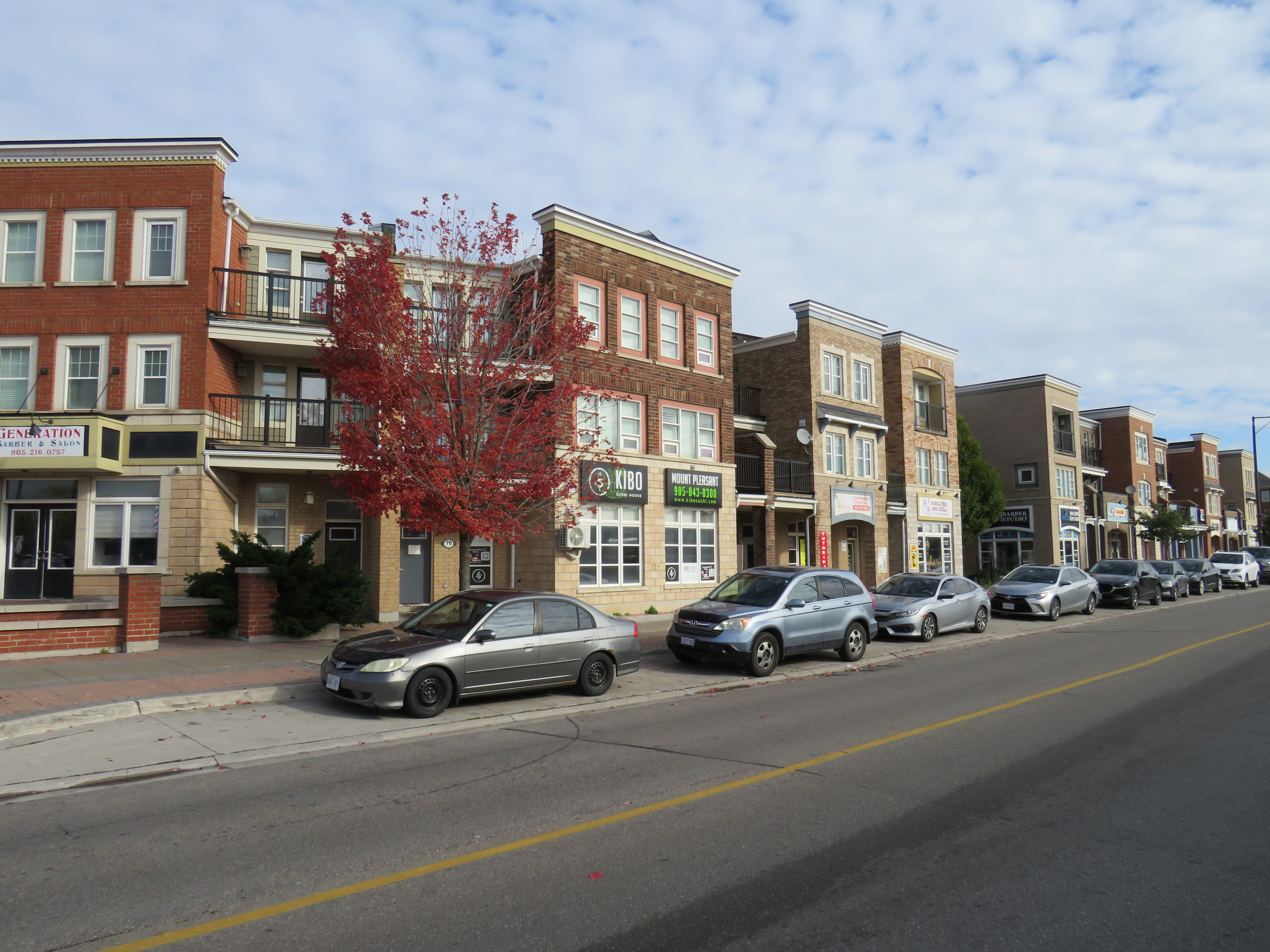
New urbanist storefronts in Mount Pleasant

Mount Pleasant is a neighbourhood of Brampton, Ontario, Canada, located in the northwestern portion of the city. Historically, the community was a rural hamlet surrounded by agricultural lands. Since the Mount Pleasant GO Station opened in 2005, the area has experienced rapid suburban growth. Also, retail amenities have opened in the area.

The public library has opened up both floor in the building, which is a reconstructed historic CPR station structure that is used as a cultural facility in the Mount Pleasant Civic Square and is shared with the Peel District School Board. The school connected to the library is Mount Pleasant Village Public School and offers grades K-8. As of the 2021 Community Profile, the neighbourhood has a population of 53,640 across 13,167 households.

== History ==
The hamlet, originally known as just Pleasant, started as a farming community centered around the 10th Sideroad and 3rd Line West intersection (today's Bovaird Drive and Creditview Rd) in Chinguacousy Township between the then-smaller Town of Brampton and Georgetown. The Grand Trunk Railway came through Pleasant in 1856, but no station was built. Over time, the hamlet acquired a church, blacksmith shop, inn, and local meeting hall. The province improved and designated the 10th Sideroad as Highway 7 through Pleasant in the 1920s, and transferred it to Peel Region in 1997 as a western extension of Bovaird Drive. Pleasant became part of the City of Brampton when Chinguacousy Township was amalgamated with the Town of Brampton in 1974.

In the 1990s, the area started being referred to as Mount Pleasant.

Much of the area around Mount Pleasant remained farmland until the construction of the Mount Pleasant GO station and encroaching suburban development in the mid-2000's. Since then, the community was developed as a transit-oriented urban village around the station, which serves as a transit hub for both GO Transit and Brampton Transit services.

A notable surviving historic building is the Mount Pleasant Presbyterian Church (at 160 Salvation Road, built in 1904 and presently home to the Masjid Al-Salam mosque).

The former Canadian Pacific Railway Brampton Station (once located in downtown Brampton, and saved by the Brampton Historic Society in 1981) was reconstructed in Mount Pleasant as part of the community centre.

== Demographics ==
In a 2021 Community Profile for Brampton-Mount Pleasant conducted by Environics Analytics, Mount Pleasant had a population of 53,640 people in 13,167 households, an increase of 28.15% from its 2019 census of 41,857. Brampton attracts a significant number of immigrants, with over half of the city's population (52.86%) having been born outside of Canada. Mount Pleasant continues the trend, with immigrants making up 57.5% of the neighbourhood's population, and visible minorities make up 86.2% of the population, with 51.0% identifying as South Asian.

Out of the 13,167 dwellings in Mount Pleasant, 96.5% are single-family houses with the other 3.5% of housing being apartments.

The median age is 46, with 30-34 year old making up the most populous segment at 9.0% (4.828). Mount Pleasant's population is younger than the national average, with 35.93% of its population being in the 0-24 age range (19,273) compared to 27.54% nationally.

Top 5 languages spoken most often at home
Language	Percentage
English	56.6%
Panjabi	11.3%
Urdu	3.2%
Gujarati	2.0%
Hindi	1.6%

== See also ==
- List of unincorporated communities in Ontario
