= Glenburnie, Ontario =

Community in Ontario, Canada

Coordinates: 44.320°N 76.501°W

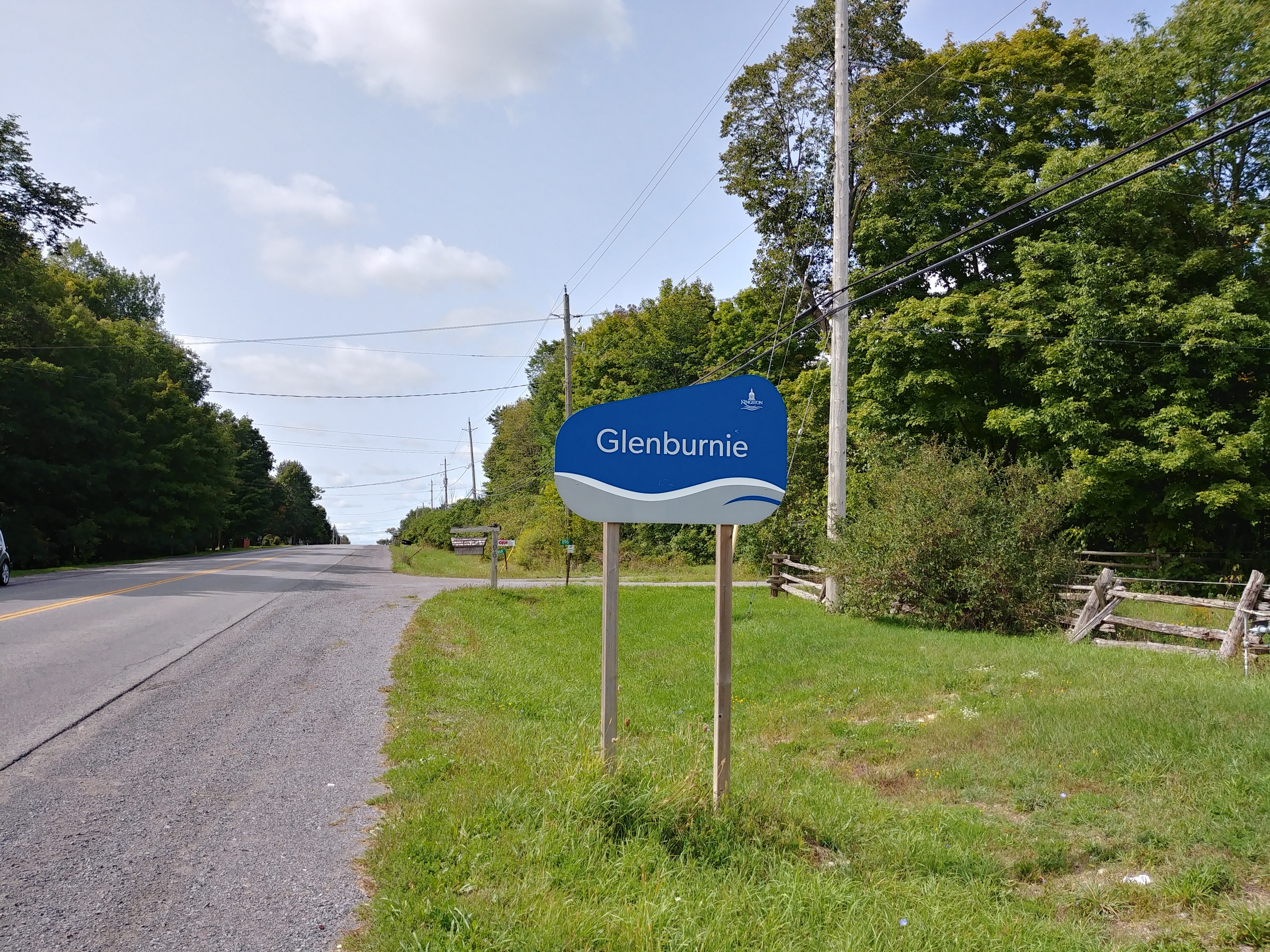
Sign for Glenburnie, Ontario

Glenburnie is an unincorporated rural community and the county seat of Frontenac County, Ontario. It is located within the city limits of Kingston.

Amenities in Glenburnie include a baseball field, a basketball court, and a playground. Children living in the community attend the Glenburnie Public School.
