= Norman, Ontario =

Norman may refer to the following communities in Ontario:

- A community that is now part of Central Elgin
- A community that is now part of Kenora
