= Olivet, Ontario =

Olivet
- Unincorporated rural community
- Location of Olivet in Canada Olivet (Canada)
- Coordinates: 43°51′10″N 80°39′36″W
- Country: Canada
- Province: Ontario
- County: Wellington
- Township: Wellington North
- Time zone: UTC-5 (Eastern (EST))
  - Summer (DST): UTC-4 (EDT)
- GNBC Code: FCGYT

Olivet is an unincorporated rural community in Wellington North Township, Wellington County, Ontario, Canada.

A post office was located in Olivet from 1886 to 1915.

Olivet was located in Arthur Township until 1999, when Arthur was amalgamated into Wellington North.

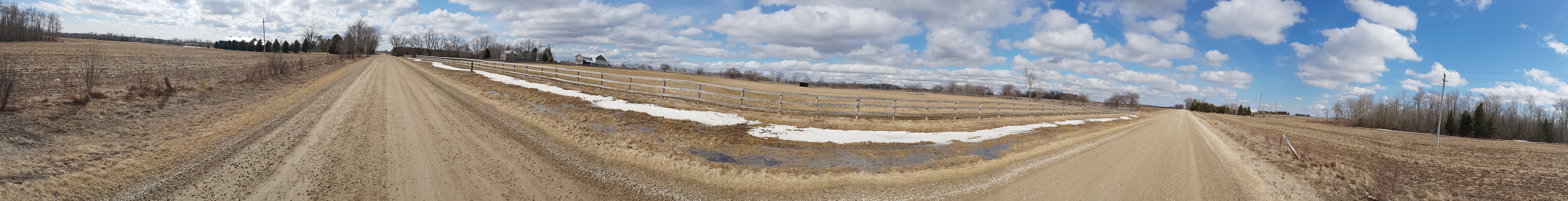
Sideroad 9 West in Olivet
