= Kilsyth, Ontario =

Coordinates: 44°30′47″N 81°00′53″W

Kilsyth is an unincorporated community in rural Georgian Bluffs Township, Ontario, Canada with an approximate population of 100 people. The village is a quiet rural place set in pleasant rolling farmland. The community is also home to the Kilsyth Arena, Kilsyth Hall, Kilsyth United Church, local bottled water company 'Cleerbrook Springs'. The K-8 Derby Public School serving pupils from the town and the surrounding district closed in June 2016.

Kilsyth was home to the Derby Township Office until amalgamation. The office has since been turned into a residential location. The township hall was sold to a scrap metal company too.

== History ==
The village of Kilsyth was founded in 1845. Alexander Fleming, a stonemason, and his wife Jean, along with their eight children settled on Lot 10, Concession 6 in 1849. They were natives of Ballinluig, Perthshire, Scotland. As emigrants, they travelled from their home to Kilsyth, Scotland with all their possessions in three one-horse carts. At Kilsyth they embarked onto a horse drawn barge on the Forth and Clyde canal, built just eleven years earlier. This was the last place they set foot on Scottish soil.

Once at Port Glasgow, they moved their belongings directly onto a four masted sailing ship, the Jeanie Deans, 298 tons, which sailed on May 1, 1843, the journey taking eleven weeks. Once arrived at Toronto, they stayed with relatives. They rented a farm in Vaughan Township. Finally able to buy their own farm they chose a plot of land in Grey County. They named their farm Springfield Farm, where they built a log cabin by a pond which still exists to this day.

Descendants of the Fleming family still live in the village.

Kilsyth was the early village of importance in Derby, situated near the center of the township on the Owen Sound and Saugeen Stage Road. The first school in the township was built on the Coulter farm, near Kilsyth, Jessie Fleming being the first teacher. The first church in the township was the English church, in what is known as the "Irish Settlement" in the third concession; and the first post office was established here, Alexander Fleming being the first postmaster.

It contained a post office, tavern, smithy, stores, and several other places of business. Most noted perhaps was the potter works started by Messrs. Walmsley and McCluskie which at one time was quite a large concern, the works producing articles of common use as well as ornaments. Among the early business men were, Thomas Sloan-merchant and postmaster; William Fleming-merchant; George Smith-keeper of the "Sloan Hotel"

Kilsyth still cherishes its Scottish roots.

== Sources and links ==
- Kilsyth International Page
