= Netherby, Ontario =

Netherby
- Unincorporated rural community
- Location within Canada Location within Ontario
- Coordinates: 42°57′42″N 79°08′02″W
- Country: Canada
- Province: Ontario
- Regional municipality: Niagara
- City: Niagara Falls
- Time zone: UTC-5 (Eastern (EST))
  - Summer (DST): UTC-4 (EDT)
- GNBC Code: FDONF

Netherby is an unincorporated rural community in the city of Niagara Falls, Niagara Region, Ontario, Canada.

== History ==
Netherby had a post office from 1862 to 1914.

By 1874, Netherby had a saw mill, store, and a population of 100.

In 1887, an independent agricultural society called the Netherby Union Agricultural Society had established its headquarters in Netherby.

Little remains of the original settlement but a store, the Netherby Variety and Convenience Store.
