= Elizabethville, Ontario =

- Dispersed rural community
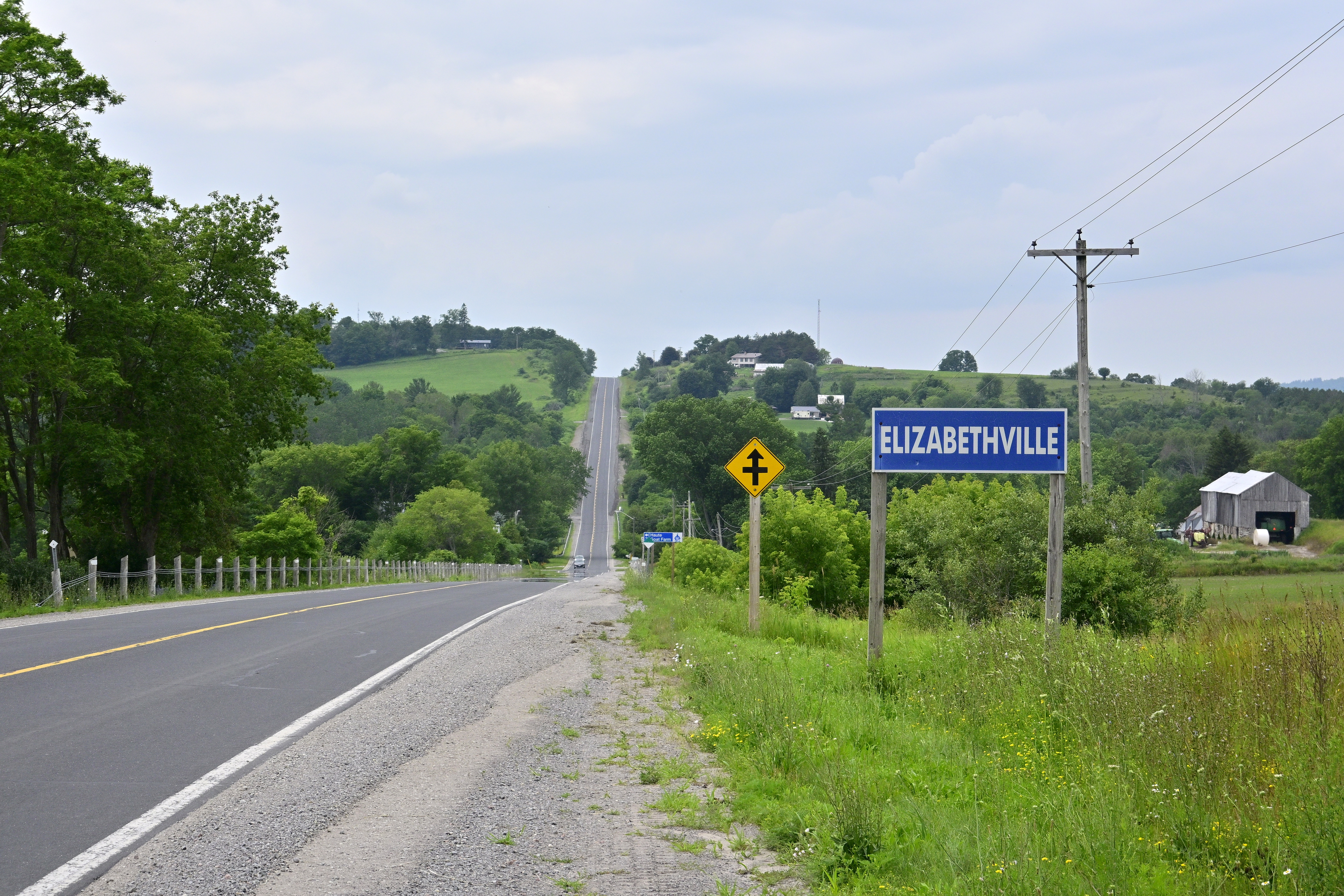
- Ganaraska Road in Elizabethville

- Location within Ontario Location within Canada
- Coordinates: 44°02′32″N 78°27′48″W
- Country: Canada
- Province: Ontario
- County: Northumberland
- Municipality: Port Hope
- Time zone: UTC-5 (Eastern (EST))
  - Summer (DST): UTC-4 (EDT)
- GNBC Code: FBCFI

Elizabethville is a dispersed rural community in Port Hope, Northumberland County, Ontario, Canada.

== History ==
Elizabethville was established around 1830 or 1840 by settlers from Cornwall, England.

A post office was established in 1850 and named "Elizabethville", in honour of the postmaster's wife Elizabeth. The early settlement had a grist mill, saw mill, shoe maker, weaver, store, Methodist church and cemetery, two cooper shops, two carpenters, two wagon shops, and two cheese factories.

The population in 1895 was 150.

An Orange lodge was established in 1900, and a Women's Institute in 1911.
