= Old Cut, Ontario =

Community in Norfolk County, Ontario, Canada

Coordinates: 42.580°N 80.399°W

Location of Old Cut in Ontario

Old Cut is a community in Norfolk County, Ontario. The area is named after the Old Cut water channel, which was originally created to allow a cut through, saving boaters approximately 40 kilometres of travel around the sand spit, Long Point. The cut no longer goes through, but remains a popular location for fishing and recreational boating.
