= Mount Pleasant, Lennox and Addington County, Ontario =

Community in Ontario, Canada

Mount Pleasant
- Community
- Interactive map of Mount Pleasant
- Coordinates: 44.252°N 77.030°W
- Country: Canada
- Province: Ontario
- County: Lennox and Addington
- Municipality: Greater Napanee
- Time zone: EST (UTC−05:00)
  - Summer (DST): EDT (UTC−04:00)

Mount Pleasant is a small community in Lennox and Addington County, Ontario, Canada, situated west of Napanee.
