= Wellington North, Ontario =

Wellington North
- Township (lower-tier)
- Township of Wellington North
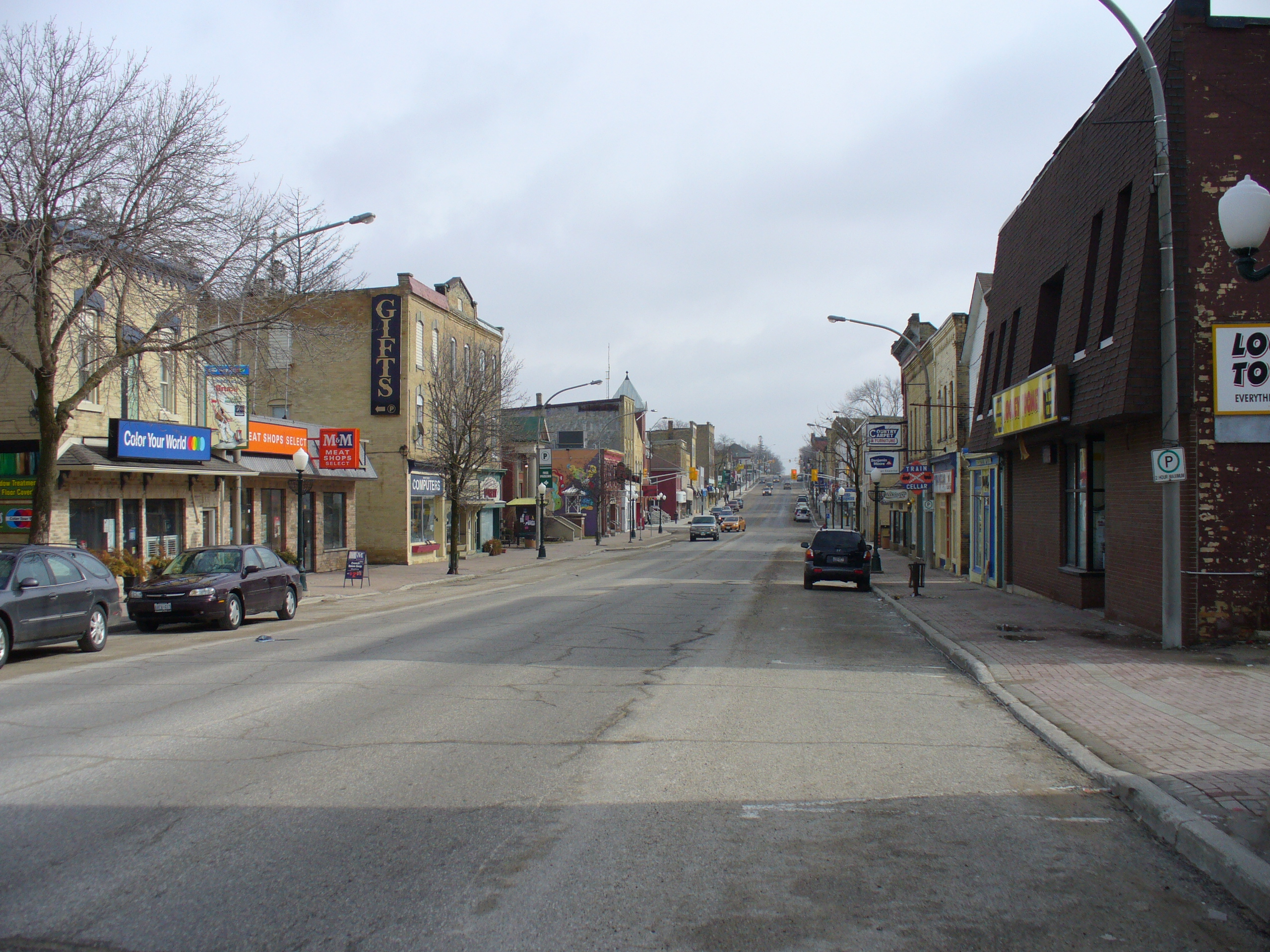
- Mount Forest

- Seal
- Motto: Semper Porro
- Location within Wellington County Location within Southern Ontario
- Coordinates: 43°54′N 80°34′W
- Country: Canada
- Province: Ontario
- County: Wellington
- Established: 1999

Government
  - Type: Township
  - Mayor: Andy Lennox
  - Councillors: List: Dan Yake; Sherry Burke; Lisa Hern; Steven Terrance McCabe
  - Governing body: Wellington North Township Council
  - Fed & Prov. riding: Perth—Wellington

Area
  - Land: 526.21 km^{2} (203.17 sq mi)

Population (2016)
  - Total: 11,914
  - Density: 22.6/km^{2} (59/sq mi)
- Time zone: UTC-5 (EST)
  - Summer (DST): UTC-4 (EDT)
- Postal code FSA: N0G
- Area codes: 519, 226, 548
- Website: wellington-north.com

Wellington North is a township in the Canadian province of Ontario, located within Wellington County.

== Communities ==
The primary communities in Wellington North are the village of Arthur and the town of Mount Forest.

The township also contains the smaller communities of Damascus, Derrynane, Farewell, Gordonville, Green Park, Kenilworth, Metz, Monck, Mount View, Olivet, Petherton, Riverstown and Wagram.

== History ==
On January 1, 1999, the township was formed through the amalgamation of the townships of Arthur and West Luther, the village of Arthur and the town of Mount Forest, and a small portion of the West Garafraxa Township.

The newly amalgamated township was named Wellington North on April 17, 1999.

== Demographics ==
In the 2021 Census of Population conducted by Statistics Canada, Wellington North had a population of 12,431 living in 4,793 of its 4,987 total private dwellings, a change of 4.3% from its 2016 population of 11,914. With a land area of 526.31 km^{2} (203.21 sq mi), it had a population density of 23.6/km^{2} (61.2/sq mi) in 2021.

Canada census – Wellington North, Ontario community profile

	2016	2011
Population	11,914 (+3.8% from 2011)	11,417 (+2.7% from 2006)
Land area	526.21 km^{2} (203.17 sq mi)	526.28 km^{2} (203.20 sq mi)
Population density	22.6/km^{2} (59/sq mi)	21.8/km^{2} (56/sq mi)
Median age	43.1 (M: 41.1, F: 45.1)	42.9 (M: 41.4, F: 44.6)
Private dwellings	4,839 (total)	4,801 (total)
Median household income	$63,712

References: 2016 2011

Wellington North Historical populations
Year	Pop.	±%
1996	10,869	—
2001	11,305	+4.0%
2006	11,175	−1.1%
2011	11,477	+2.7%
2016	11,914	+3.8%

== Education ==
Wellington North is served by five elementary schools and one secondary school, under jurisdiction of two school boards, the public board being Upper Grand District School Board, and the Catholic board being Wellington Catholic District School Board, both of which are based in Guelph. Elementary schools include:

- Arthur Public School
- Kenilworth Public School
- St. John Catholic School (Arthur)
- St. Mary Catholic School (Mount Forest)
- Victoria Cross Public School (Mount Forest)

Wellington Heights Secondary School in Mount Forest is the only high school in the township, and is part of the public school board. Catholic students must go to Guelph for Catholic secondary education, at Saint James Catholic High School.

== Media ==
Wellington North is served by several local newspapers:

- Arthur Enterprise News
- Mount Forest Confederate
- Wellington Advertiser

== Symbols ==
The township logo was designed by Reg Mason. The tree represents forested areas; the brickwork and shield represent the foundation for the new era; and within the shield is a buggy representing the Mennonite people. The church stands for freedom of religious choice, and the great blue heron represents the phantom of the marsh. The large toothed wheel stands for industry, and the grain sheaths represent the agriculture of the area. The motto, Semper Porro, is Latin for "Forever Forward".

== See also ==
- List of townships in Ontario
