= Raglan, Durham Regional Municipality, Ontario =

Small community in Ontario, Canada

Coordinates: 44.017°N 78.926°W

Location of Raglan in Ontario

Raglan is a community in Ontario. It is located 10 miles north of Oshawa and 35 miles northeast of Toronto. The village is famous for the country store and farm on the corner of Simcoe and Raglan Road. White Feather Farms first started in the 1960s when a former Dutch settler purchased the property. The farm is now under management by the second generation and has expanded numerous times with a new 15,000 bird barn.

Raglan is also the site of the Old Oshawa Ski Club on the current grounds of Trillium Trails Banquet Facility and TreeTop Eco-Adventure Park. Trillium Trails used to run cross country skiing on some of the old trails of the Oshawa Ski Club and signs at the new Zip-lining park, point out the property's heritage.
