= Georgian Bluffs =

- Township (lower-tier)
- Township of Georgian Bluffs
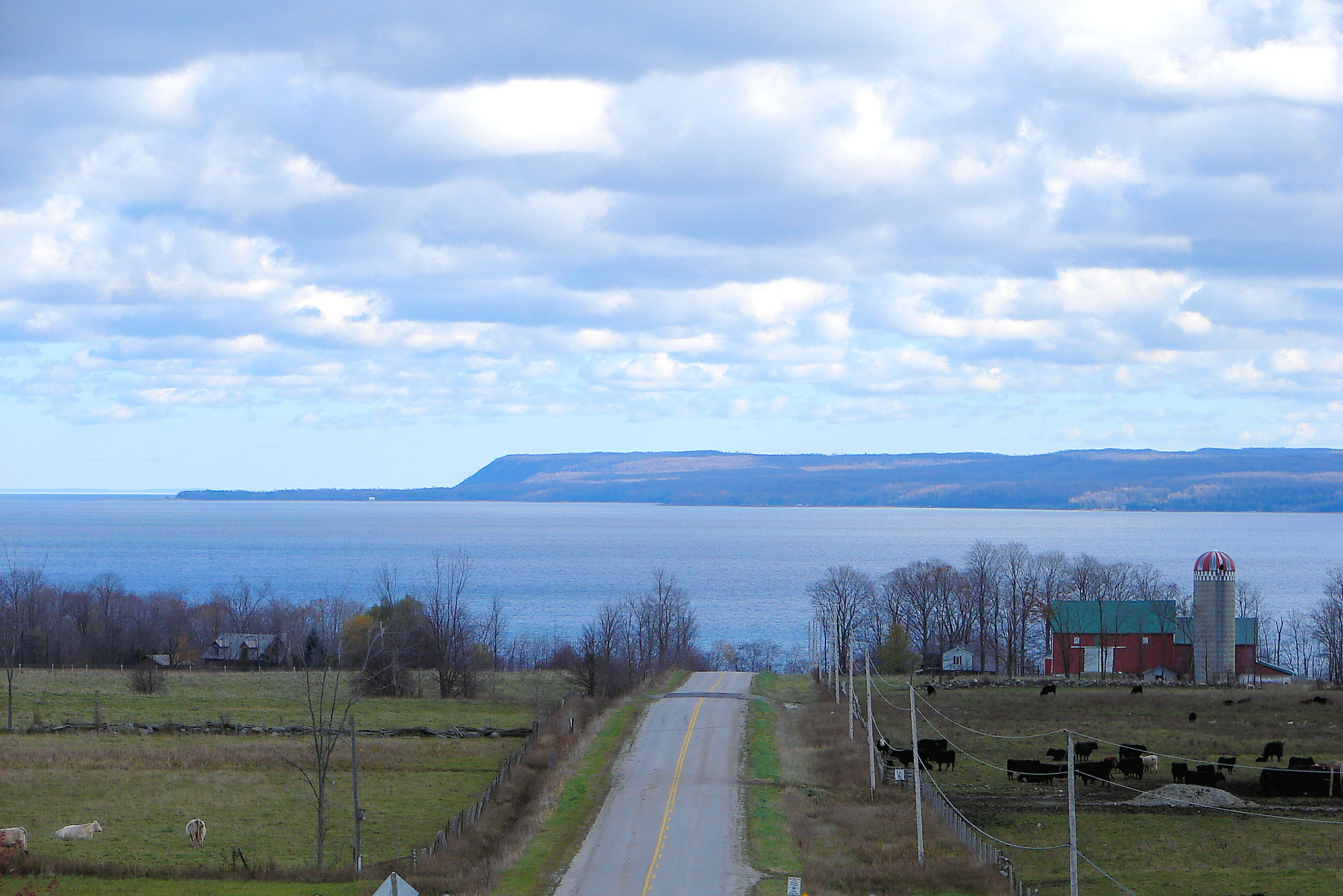

- Location within Grey County Location within Southern Ontario
- Coordinates: 44°39′N 81°02′W
- Country: Canada
- Province: Ontario
- County: Grey
- Formed: January 1, 2001

Government
  - Mayor: Sue Carleton
  - Fed. riding: Bruce—Grey—Owen Sound
  - Prov. riding: Bruce—Grey—Owen Sound

Area
  - Land: 599.96 km^{2} (231.65 sq mi)

Population (2021)
  - Total: 11,100
  - Density: 18.5/km^{2} (48/sq mi)
- Time zone: UTC-5 (EST)
  - Summer (DST): UTC-4 (EDT)
- Area codes: 519, 226, 548
- Website: www.georgianbluffs.on.ca

Georgian Bluffs is a township in southwestern Ontario, Canada, in Grey County located between Colpoy's Bay and Owen Sound on Georgian Bay.

The township was incorporated on January 1, 2001, by amalgamating the former Townships of Derby, Keppel, and Sarawak, and the former Village of Shallow Lake.

== History ==
The now-former township of Derby was surveyed by the prolific Crown land surveyor Charles Rankin in 1846.

== Communities ==
The township comprises the communities of:

- Alvanley
- Balmy Beach
- Benallen
- Big Bay
- Clavering
- Copperkettle
- Cruickshank
- East Linton
- Hogg
- Inglis Falls
- Jackson
- Keady
- Kemble
- Kilsyth
- Lake Charles
- Lindenwood
- Oxenden
- Shallow Lake
- Shouldice
- Springmount
- Squire
- Wolseley
- Zion

== Demographics ==
In the 2021 Census of Population conducted by Statistics Canada, Georgian Bluffs had a population of 11,100 living in 4,495 of its 5,269 total private dwellings, a change of 5.9% from its 2016 population of 10,479. With a land area of 599.96 km^{2} (231.65 sq mi), it had a population density of 18.5/km^{2} (47.9/sq mi) in 2021.

Canada census – Georgian Bluffs community profile

| | 2021 | 2016 | 2011 |
| Population | 11,100 (+5.9% from 2016) | 10,479 (0.7% from 2011) | 10,404 (-1.0% from 2006) |
| Land area | 599.96 km^{2} (231.65 sq mi) | 604.37 km^{2} (233.35 sq mi) | 604.36 km^{2} (233.34 sq mi) |
| Population density | 18.5/km^{2} (48/sq mi) | 17.3/km^{2} (45/sq mi) | 17.2/km^{2} (45/sq mi) |
| Median age | 51.2 (M: 50.4, F: 52.0) | 45.6 (M: 45.3, F: 45.9) |
| Private dwellings | 5,269 (total) 4,495 (occupied) | 5,069 (total) | 4,896 (total) |
| Median household income | $94,000 | $77,861 |

References: 2021 2016 2011

Historical census populations – Georgian Bluffs

| Year | Pop. | ±% |
|---|---|---|
| 1996 | 10,256 | — |
| 2001 | 10,152 | −1.0% |
| 2006 | 10,506 | +3.5% |

| Year | Pop. | ±% |
|---|---|---|
| 2011 | 10,404 | −1.0% |
| 2016 | 10,479 | +0.7% |
| 2021 | 11,100 | +5.9% |

Population counts are not adjusted for boundary changes.
Source: Statistics Canada

== See also ==
- List of townships in Ontario
