= Ontario Highway 19 =

Ontario provincial highway

Highway 19
- Highway 19 highlighted in red

Route information
- Maintained by the Ministry of Transportation of Ontario
- Length: 24.1 km (15.0 mi)
- Existed: March 12, 1930–present

Major junctions
- South end: Highway 3 in Tillsonburg
- County Road 18 – Mount Elgin
- North end: Highway 401 near Ingersoll

Location
- Country: Canada
- Province: Ontario
- Towns: Ingersoll, Tillsonburg

Highway system
- Ontario provincial highways; Current; Former; 400-series
← Highway 17	→ Highway 20
Former provincial highways
← Highway 18

King's Highway 19, commonly referred to as Highway 19, is a provincially maintained highway in the Canadian province of Ontario, connecting Highway 3 in Tillsonburg with Highway 401 southeast of Ingersoll. The highway began as the Plank and Gravel Road, a toll road formed by the Ingersoll and Port Burwell Road Company. It was first assigned in 1930. Several extensions in the early 1930s took the route north to Highway 86 at Tralee. However, a significant amount of Highway 19 was decommissioned and turned over to local and county governments in 1997 and 1998.

== Route description ==
The southern end of Highway 19 begins at Highway 3 in Tillsonburg, while the northern end terminates 400 metres north of the centreline of Highway 401, southeast of the Ingersoll town limits. Highway 19 is situated entirely in Oxford County and serves the communities of Ostrander, Mount Elgin and Salford. Prior to 1998, it began in Port Burwell on the shores of Lake Erie, while the northern terminus extended to Highway 86 east of Listowel in the community of Tralee.

The route begins on the southern edge of Tillsonburg at Highway 3 (Talbot Road), travelling north along the eastern side of Big Otter Creek. This section of the highway, known as Vienna Road, lies next to a business/industrial park. At County Road 51 (Simcoe Street), Vienna Road ends and Highway 19 turns west, becoming Oxford Street and crossing Big Otter Creek. At Broadway Street, Highway 19 turns northwest and passes through the downtown strip as well as beside Tillsonburg Town Centre. It continues into residential subdivisions, eventually exiting the town into the municipality of South-West Oxford as it turns north at Quarter Town Line and becomes Plank Line.

The route enters farmland, but bisects the hamlet of Ostrander shortly thereafter. It crosses the Ontario Southland Railway, which lies roughly parallel to the entire length of the highway, before passing west of Tillsonburg Airport and curving northwest. After travelling through farmland, the route enter Mount Elgin and intersects County Road 18 (Mt. Elgin Road). After, it continues through more farmland to the community of Salford, where it encounters County Road 46 (Salford Road). It turns northward briefly, emerging back into agricultural surroundings for the final stretch of the route. Just southeast of Ingersoll, it encounters an interchange with Highway 401 (Exit 218); Highway 19 ends immediately north of the westbound ramps. County Road 119 (Harris Street) continues northwest into the town to meet former Highway 2.

== History ==
The history of Highway 19 dates back to 1849, when the Baldwin Act and the Act to Authorize Formation of Joint Stock Companies were passed. George Tillson, his sons, and his brother-in-law Benjamin Van Norman were the principal stockholders of the Ingersoll and Port Burwell Road Company, which they formed along with approximately 200 shareholders in September 1849. Proceeding quickly, the company established eight toll booths along the new route, which became known as the Plank and Gravel Road due to the materials with which it was constructed. However, the greed of toll road operators resulted in diminishing upkeep, which forced the province to enact legislature allowing counties to assume ownership of the roads. It took until 1907 for Oxford County to assume the toll road; the proprietors were compensated with $15,500 ($363,400 when adjusted for inflation from 1916).

The gradual implementation of various legislation over the following decade allowed many counties to vastly improve roads under their jurisdiction. By the time the Department of Highways (DHO) assumed the road from Highway 3 in Tillsonburg to Highway 2 in Ingersoll on March 12, 1930 as King's Highway 19, it was once again a gravel road. A year later, on May 27, 1931, the highway was extended north from Woodstock to Shakespeare. As a result of this, a concurrency with Highway 2 was created between Ingersoll and Woodstock. Several months later, on July 1, the department assumed the remainder of the Ingersoll to Port Burwell Road, extending Highway 19 south of Tillsonburg.

As part of a depression relief program, the DHO and Department of Labour undertook several projects in 1933 and 1934, one of which included the Stratford to Tralee Road. On July 4, 1934, the DHO assumed the road as part of Highway 19. To remedy the discontinuity, a 12-kilometre (7.5 mi) concurrency with Highway 7 was established. At this point, Highway 19 had grown from its original length of 25.1 kilometres (15.6 mi) to 148.4 kilometres (92.2 mi).

The route remained unchanged until the early 1960s, when several highways were renumbered. On December 19, 1961, Highway 19 between Woodstock and Shakespeare was redesignated as Highway 59, while Highway 100 between Thamesford and St. Marys was redesignated as Highway 19. The concurrencies with Highway 2 and Highway 7 were relocated as a result of this renumbering; Highway 19 became concurrent with Highway 2 between Ingersoll and Thamesford, and with Highway 7 between St. Marys and Stratford. While the length of the route was reduced insignificantly as a result of this renumbering, it became more direct.

Between then and 1997, no changes were made to Highway 19. On April 1, 1997, the section from Highway 3 south to Port Burwell was transferred to Elgin County, Oxford County and Haldimand–Norfolk. This was followed by a second round of transfers on January 1, 1998, which resulted in the section north of Highway 401 being decommissioned and assumed by Oxford County and Perth County.

Today, the majority of the Port Burwell to Tillsonburg segment is designated as Elgin County Road 19. A short segment in Haldimand–Norfolk and Oxford County immediately south of Tillsonburg is designated as County Highway 19. The Ingersoll to St. Marys segment is now known as Oxford County Road 119, while the segment north of Stratford is designated as Perth County Road 119 through Brunner, then Perth County Road 131 through Milverton.

== Major intersections ==
The following table lists the major junctions along Highway 19, as noted by the Ministry of Transportation of Ontario.

Division	Location	km	mi	Destinations	Notes
Elgin	Bayham	−25.7	−16.0	Elgin County Road 19 begins	Port Burwell; Lake Erie waterfront; former Highway 19 southern terminus
Elgin–Norfolk boundary		−4.4	−2.7	Elgin County Road 19 ends Norfolk County Highway 19 begins	
Norfolk–Oxford boundary		−0.6	−0.37	Norfolk County Highway 19 ends	
Oxford	Tillsonburg	0.0	0.0	Highway 19 begins Highway 3 – St. Thomas, Simcoe	Highway 19 southern terminus; beginning of Tillsonburg Connecting Link
Oxford	Tillsonburg	1.4	0.87	County Road 51 east (Simcoe Street)	
Oxford	Tillsonburg	1.7	1.1	County Road 53 north (Tillson Avenue) / Bloomer Street	
Oxford	Tillsonburg	4.7	2.9	County Road 20 (Brownsville Road / North Street E)	
Oxford	Tillsonburg	5.5	3.4		Tillsonburg town limits; end of Connecting Link
Oxford	South-West Oxford	7.9	4.9	County Road 19 east (Ostrander Road)	Ostrander
Oxford	South-West Oxford	11.1	6.9	County Road 27 west (Prouse Road)	
Oxford	South-West Oxford	14.3	8.9	County Road 18 east (Norwich Road)	Mount Elgin
Oxford	South-West Oxford	19.7	12.2	County Road 46 (Salford Road)	Salford
Oxford	South-West Oxford	21.7	13.5	County Road 12 east (Sweaburg Road)	
Oxford	Ingersoll	24.1	15.0	Highway 401 – London, Toronto Highway 19 ends Oxford County Road 119 begins	Highway 19 northern terminus; Highway 401 exit 218
Oxford	Zorra	36.9– 37.1	22.9– 23.1	County Road 2 (Dundas Street) – London, Woodstock	Thamesford; formerly Highway 2; intersections offset and 200 m (660 ft) concurrency
Perth–Oxford boundary	Perth South–Zorra boundary	59.7	37.1	County Road 118 north – St. Marys Highway 7 west – Elginfield	Oxford County Road 119 northern terminus; former southern end of Highway 7 concurrency
Stratford		75.7	47.0	Highway 8 west (Huron Street) – Goderich	Former southern end of Highway 8 concurrency
Stratford		75.9	47.2	Highway 7 east / Highway 8 (Ontario Street) – Kitchener	Former northern end of Highway 7 / Highway 8 concurrency
Perth	Perth East	78.9	49.0	Perth County Road 119 begins	Stratford city limits
Perth	Perth East	98.8	61.4	County Line 55 north Perth County Road 119 ends Perth County Road 131 begins	
Perth–Wellington boundary	Perth East–Mapleton boundary	118.1	73.4	Perth County Line 86 / Wellington County Road 86	Formerly Highway 86; former Highway 19 northern terminus
1.000 mi = 1.609 km; 1.000 km = 0.621 mi: Closed/former; Route transition
