= Telegalápagos =

Television station in the Galápagos Islands, Ecuador

Telegalápagos is an Ecuadorian television station licensed to Puerto Baquerizo Moreno, capital of the Galápagos Islands, on channel 13, with an additional relay station in Puerto Ayora on channel 7.

== History ==
Tele Galápagos started broadcasting in 1980, twenty years after the first commercial broadcasts were made in the Ecuadorian mainland. The station was installed by the Mission of Saint Francis to the Galápagos Islands with its initial coverage area limited to Puerto Baquerizo Moreno. However, the religious mission had plans to increase its coverage area to include the area of El Progreso Parish - 7 km away from Puerto Baquerizo Moreno. During the 1980s, Telegalápagos would often invite families and young people to regular meetings to help with the station's outreach. It was seen as an early example of Christian groups in Ecuador using mass media and religious broadcasting for preaching. Telegalápagos was one of three television stations in Ecuador that had direct involvement from the Roman Catholic Church in its governance structure, with the Apostolic Prefecture of the Galápagos having oversight of it.

In the 1980s, it was the only television station available in the Galápagos Islands, using a 200W transmitter. The station gained a permanent license on September 16, 1996.

In July 2023, the station alongside Radio Voz de Galápagos signed an agreement with the Salesian Polytechnic University to enable opportunities to future staff.

== Programming ==
By the 1990s, the Franciscan Order administering Telegalápagos often utilised it to broadcast educational and cultural programming. However, this later extended to broadcasting more commercial programmes. The station does not produce its own news programmes, in keeping with other smaller television stations in Ecuador.
