= Carthage (disambiguation) =

Carthage (Latin: Carthago or Karthago) was the capital city of Ancient Carthage, and is currently an archaeological site near Tunis, Tunisia.

Carthage or Carthago may also refer to:

- Ancient Carthage

== Places ==
=== United States ===
- Carthage, Arkansas
- Carthage, California, former name of Cartago, California
- Carthage, Illinois
- Carthage, Indiana
- Carthage, Maine
- Carthage, Mississippi
- Carthage, Missouri; the most populous Carthage in the United States
- Carthage, New York; the oldest United States place with this name, though it did not receive this name until after other American Carthages were settled
- Carthage, North Carolina
- Carthage, Ohio (disambiguation); multiple places, all of which are no longer an independent municipality named Carthage
- Carthage, South Dakota
- Carthage, Tennessee, the first place in the United States with this name, but not the first one settled
- Carthage, Texas
- Carthage Lake, Illinois
- South Carthage, Tennessee
- West Carthage, New York
- Carthage Landing (New Carthage); a historical place

=== Elsewhere ===
- Carthage (episcopal see), the city restored to importance by Julius Caesar and Augustus
- Carthage, Ontario, Canada
- Carthago, Sudan
- Tunis–Carthage International Airport, in Tunis, Tunisia

== People ==
- Five Martyrs of Carthage, Felix of Thibiuca, Audactus, Fortunatus, Januarius, and Septimus, all martyred during the Great Persecution under the Roman emperor Diocletian
- Saint Carthage the Elder, also known as Carthach
- Saint Carthage the Younger, also known as Carthage of Lismore or Mochuda ("My Carthage")

== Arts, entertainment, and media ==
- Carthage, novel by Ross Leckie
- Carthage, novel by Joyce Carol Oates
- Carthage, a portion of fictional virtual world in television animation series Code Lyoko

== Military ==
=== At Carthage in North Africa ===
- Battle of Carthage (c. 149 BC) (Punic), Carthaginians vs. Romans
- Battle of Carthage (238), in civil war among Romans
- Battle of Carthage (533), a.k.a. Battle of Ad Decimum, Vandals vs. Byzantines
- Battle of Carthage (698), Byzantines vs. Arabs

=== Other engagements ===
- Battle of Carthage (1861), in American Civil War
- Operation Carthage (1945), air raid on Copenhagen

== Other uses ==
- Carthage College in Kenosha, Wisconsin
- Carthage Jail, in Illinois where Joseph Smith, Jr. was murdered
- Councils of Carthage, theological events in between 251 and 525 CE

== See also ==
- Cartagena (disambiguation)
- Cartago (disambiguation)
