= San Cristóbal Canton =

- Canton
- Cantons of Galápagos Province
- Coordinates: 0°48′S 89°24′W
- Country: Ecuador
- Province: Galápagos Province
- Capital: Puerto Baquerizo Moreno

Area
  - Total: 828.6 km^{2} (319.9 sq mi)

Population (2022 census)
  - Total: 8,300
  - Density: 10/km^{2} (26/sq mi)

San Cristóbal Canton is a canton of Ecuador in the Galápagos Islands archipelago and one of the oldest in this insular geological formation. It consists of Española, Floreana, Genovesa, San Cristóbal, and Santa Fe Islands.

== History ==
Manuel Julián Cobos founded a sugar cane plantation and sugar refinery shortly after 1869. He built a fortune after the sugar production and contributed to the San Cristobal settlement. He took the produce to sell in Guayaquil. In 1904, the workers, who were tired of abuse from their master, revolted and killed him. The revolting workers were in fact inmates that were placed initially under Antonio Gil Quezada's orders, but later the Ecuadorian authorities worked together with Manuel Julián Cobos to take the inmates as laborers.

Nowadays, their descendants remain on the isle, both Cobos (descendants from Cobos' son Manuel Cobos Tomalá) and his workers. However, some of Cobos descendants (descendants from his daughter Josefina Cobos Baquerizo (universal and rightful heir according to his last will)) remained on the continent (in Ecuador and México) and are spread even into Europe (The Netherlands).

== Tourism ==
The island has white coral and shell beaches and is popular with tourists. One place frequented by tourists is the area where the famous giant Galápagos tortoises live. There are also impressive sights such as El Junco, a fresh water lake in the crater of a volcano, the Leon Dormido, the Isla Lobos and the Cerro Tijeretas, which lie near Puerto Baquerizo Moreno, the provincial capital. Near Puerto Baqerizo Mareno there is also an Interpretation Centre with exhibits about the history, culture, flora and fauna of the island.

There are also animals which are unique to the island, such as a species of mockingbird, and the lava lizard; there are also unique plants such as the Calandrinia galapagosa and the Lecocarpus darwinii. Large, colourful birds and sea lions can also be seen.
