= Manuel Antonio Valarezo Luzuriaga =

Ecuadorian Roman Catholic cleric (born 1937)

Manuel Antonio Valarezo Luzuriaga OFM
- Vicar Apostolic Emeritus of Galápagos
- Church: Catholic Church
- See: Apostolic Vicariate of Galápagos
- In office: 22 June 1990 – 29 October 2013
- Predecessor: Víctor Maldonado Barreno
- Successor: Patricio Bonilla Bonilla
- Other post: Titular Bishop of Quaestoriana (since 1996)

Orders
- Ordination: 11 August 1962
- Consecration: 23 June 1996 by Francesco Canalini

Personal details
- Born: 7 June 1937 (age 89)

Manuel Antonio Valarezo Luzuriaga (born 7 June 1937) is an Ecuadorian Roman Catholic cleric and Professor Emeritus Apostolic Vicar of the Apostolic Vicariate of Galápagos in Ecuador.

He was born in the rural parish of Zaruma, (Loja Malvas Province) Ecuador, and was ordained a priest on 11 August 1962.

He had studied communication science and held various positions in the pastoral care and administration branches of the church, including two terms as provincial minister of the Franciscan Friars Minor in Venezuela and Peru.

He was appointed Prefect of the Galápagos, Ecuador on 22 June 1990, and Vicar Apostolic of Galápagos in 2008, a position he resigned on 29 October 2013.

On 22 April 1996 he was appointed by Pope John Paul II as the titular bishop of Quaestoriana.
