= Immaculate Conception Cathedral, Puerto Baquerizo Moreno =

Immaculate Conception Cathedral
- Catedral de la Inmaculada Concepción
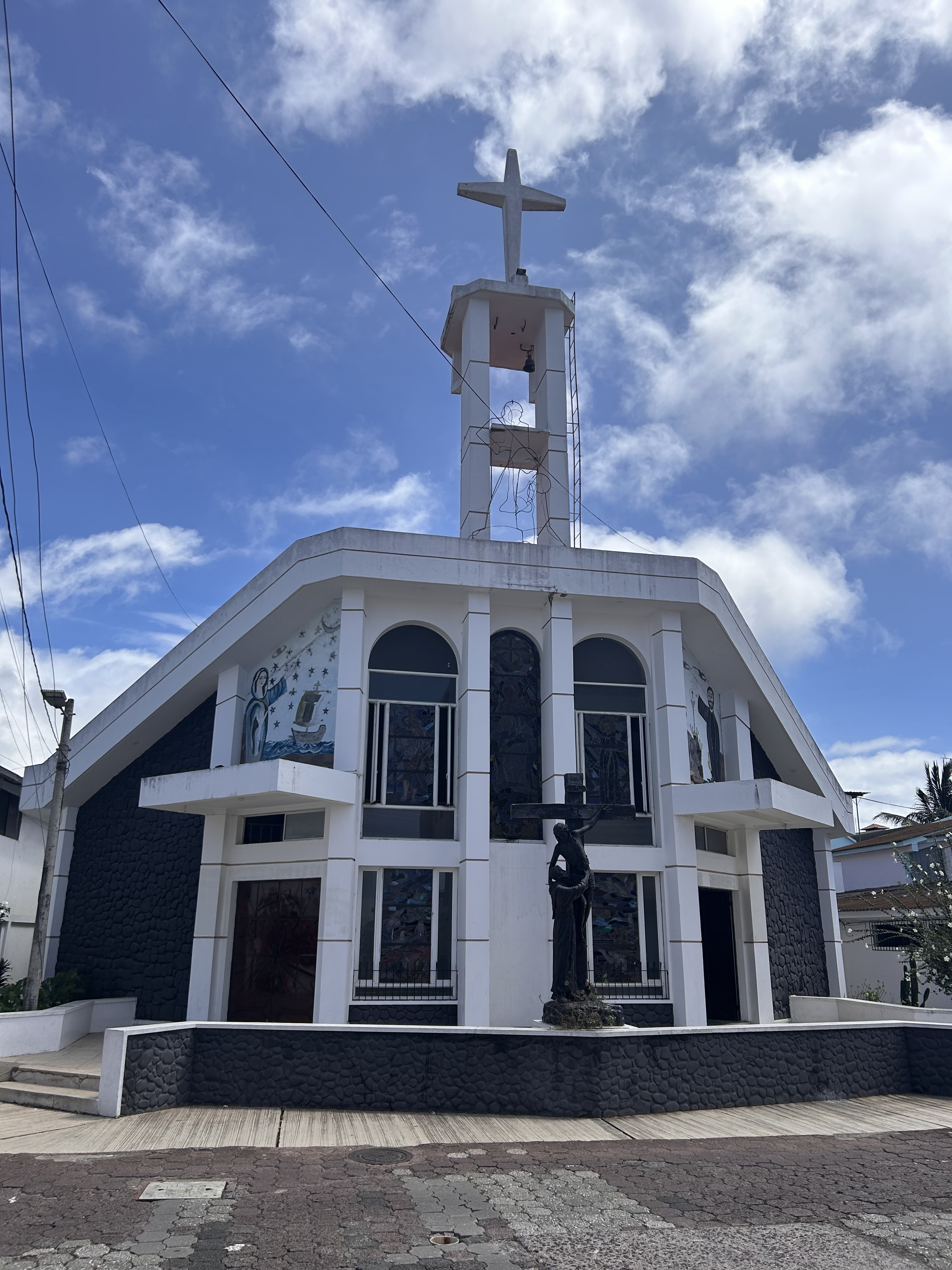

- Location within Galápagos Islands
- Immaculate Conception Cathedral
- 0°54′14″S 89°36′40″W
- Location: Puerto Baquerizo Moreno
- Country: Ecuador
- Denomination: Roman Catholic Church

Immaculate Conception Cathedral (Spanish: Catedral de la Inmaculada Concepción) is a Roman Catholic cathedral located in Puerto Baquerizo Moreno, the capital of San Cristóbal Island in the Galápagos Islands, Ecuador. It serves as the episcopal seat of the Apostolic Vicariate of Galápagos, a Latin Church jurisdiction of the Catholic Church that is immediately exempt to the Holy See.

== History ==
The Catholic Church established a formal presence in the Galápagos Islands on 6 May 1950, when Pope Pius XII created the Apostolic Prefecture of Galápagos, separating it from the territory of the Diocese of Guayaquil. On 15 July 2008, Pope Benedict XVI elevated the jurisdiction to an Apostolic Vicariate. The Immaculate Conception Cathedral was designated as its episcopal seat.

== Architecture ==
The cathedral features a modest, contemporary design that reflects both its insular context and environmental sensitivity. The building incorporates Christian symbolism along with thematic elements representing the natural heritage of the Galápagos, in alignment with the Church's ecological orientation.

== Role ==
The cathedral functions as the liturgical and administrative center for the Apostolic Vicariate. As of 2025, the Apostolic Vicar is Áureo Patricio Bonilla Bonilla, O.F.M. He was appointed by Pope Francis and consecrated bishop at the cathedral on 7 December 2013.

The cathedral provides regular pastoral services to both local residents and visitors, including celebration of the Eucharist, sacraments, and catechesis. It also supports missionary activity and charitable outreach across the islands.

== Location ==
The cathedral is situated on Avenida Alsacio Northia in the center of Puerto Baquerizo Moreno, within walking distance of the town's waterfront. It is a prominent religious and cultural site for the local Catholic community.

== See also ==
- Roman Catholicism in Ecuador
- Immaculate Conception Cathedral
