= Brownsville, Ontario =

Brownsville, Ontario can mean the following places:

- Brownsville, Durham Regional Municipality, Ontario
- Brownsville, Oxford County, Ontario

Brownsville may also refer to:

- the original name of Schomberg, Ontario
- an early settlement of Woodbridge, Ontario, founded between 1802 and 1837, now subsumed by Woodbridge

== See also ==
- Brownsville Station, Ontario
