= Cartagena =

Cartagena or Carthagena may refer to:

== Places ==
=== Chile ===
- Cartagena, Chile, a commune in Valparaíso Region

=== Colombia ===
- Cartagena, Colombia, a city in the Bolívar Department, the largest city with this name
  - Roman Catholic Archdiocese of Cartagena, an archdiocese located in the city of Cartagena in Colombia
  - Cartagena Province, a historical province that was part of the Republic of Gran Colombia, of which the eponymous city was the capital
  - Cartagena Refinery, an oil refinery in Cartagena, Colombia. It is operated by Refineria de Cartagena S.A. (Reficar), a subsidiary of Ecopetrol
- Cartagena del Chairá, a town and municipality in the department of Caquetá

=== Spain ===
- Cartagena, Spain, a city in the Region of Murcia
  - Roman Catholic Diocese of Cartagena, the diocese of the city of Cartagena in the Ecclesiastical province of Granada in Spain
  - Campo de Cartagena, a comarca in the Region of Murcia, southeastern Spain

=== United States ===
- Carthagena, Ohio, an unincorporated community in Mercer County, Ohio

== People ==
- Alfonso de Cartagena (1384–1456), Jewish-Spanish Catholic bishop, diplomat, historian and writer
- Carlos Mauricio Funes Cartagena (born 1959), a Salvadoran politician, president starting 2009
- Cristóbal Ramírez de Cartagena (1583–1584), Spanish colonial administrator in Peru
- Fulgentius of Cartagena (6th century–630), a Spanish Catholic bishop
- José N. Gándara Cartagena (1907–1954), a Puerto Rican physician and public servant
- Joseph Cartagena or Fat Joe (born 1970), an American rapper
- Juan de Cartagena (died c. 1520), Spanish accountant, captain of the San Antonio during Ferdinand Magellan's circumnavigation
- Juan José Cartagena (1876–1881), Puerto Rican mayor
- Miguel Cartagena (born 1992), Puerto Rican-American boxer
- Modesto Cartagena (1921–2010), highly decorated Puerto Rican soldier
- Nicolás Nogueras Cartagena (1935–2019), a Puerto Rican politician and commentator
- Raúl Gándara Cartagena (1895–1989), Puerto Rican fire chief
- Serafín Cartagena Ocaña (1924–2026), Ecuadorian Roman Catholic bishop and apostolic vicar
- Teresa de Cartagena (born c. 1420), Spanish nun and author
- Victoria Cartagena (born 1985), American actress

== Arts, entertainment, and media ==
- Cartagena (board game), a German-style board game released in 2000, that takes as its theme the legendary 1672 pirate-led jailbreak from the dreaded fortress of Cartagena
- Cartagena (film), a 2009 film
- Cartagena (novel), a 2015 novel by Claudia Amengual
- Cartagena Film Festival, in Cartagena, Colombia
- Neo Cartagena, a fictitious lunar city in Mobile Suit Victory Gundam that developed mobile armors for the Zanscare Empire

== Historical events ==
- Battle of Cartagena (209 BC), a battle in what is now Cartagena, Spain
- Battle of Cartagena (461), a naval battle off what is now Cartagena, Spain
- Battle of Cartagena (1643), a naval battle off Cartagena, Spain
- Raid on Cartagena (1697), a siege of Cartagena, Colombia
- Battle of Cartagena de Indias, a 1741 battle in Cartagena, Colombia
- Battle of Cartagena (1758), a naval battle Cartagena, Spain
- Cartagena Manifesto, an 1812 document written in Cartagena, Colombia
- Siege of Cartagena (1815), a siege of Cartagena, Colombia
- Cartagena uprising, a 1939 (Spanish Civil War) uprising in Cartagena, Spain

== Sports teams ==
- Cartagena CF, a football club based in Cartagena, Spain
- Cartagena FC, a football club based in Cartagena, Spain
- FC Cartagena, a football club based in Cartagena, Spain
- FS Cartagena, a futsal club based in Cartagena, Spain
- Real Cartagena, a football club based in Cartagena, Colombia

== Other uses ==
- Cartagena Protocol on Biosafety, an international agreement on biosafety, as a supplement to the Convention on Biological Diversity
- Cartagena (Madrid Metro), a station on Line 7
- Cartagena (Mexibús), a BRT station in Tultitlán, Mexico

== See also ==
- Carthage (disambiguation)
