= Cartago =

Cartago may refer to:

- Cartago, Valle del Cauca, Colombia
- Cartago Province, Costa Rica
- Cartago, Costa Rica, capital of the province of Cartago
- Cartago, California, United States

== See also ==
- Carthage (disambiguation) in Latin and related languages
- Carthago or Charthage, Phoenician colony
