= List of numbered roads in Oxford County =

List of county roads

The following are Roads in Oxford County, Ontario as maintained by that county:

Road number	Communities served	Direction	Notes
2	Thamesford, Rayside, Woodstock, Highway 401, Eastwood, Gobles, Princeton	East/West	formerly Ontario Highway 2
3	Washington, Drumbo, Princeton	North/South	
4	Innerkip, Woodstock	North/South	Begins at Road 29 as Innerkip's Blandford St., and intersects with Roads 5, 17 and 2 before ending at Road 15.
5	near Innerkip	North/South	
6	Brooksdale, Embro, Highway 401, Foldens	North/South	
7	Rayside, Ingersoll	North/South	
8	Hickson, Bright, Plattsville, Washington	East/West	
9	Ingersoll, Beachville, Woodstock	North/South	original alignment of King's Highway 2 between Ingersoll and Woodstock
10	Ingersoll, Highway 401, Verschoyle, Culloden, Brownsville	North/South	
11	Beachville	North/South	short connector CR 2 and CR 9
12	Ontario Highway 19, Foldens, Sweaburg, Highway 401, Woodstock	North/South	Sweaburg Road
13	Holbrook, Springford	North/South	sometimes referred to as Highway 59A
14	north of Norwich	North/South	connects CR 59 with CR 14 and CR 55
15	Woodstock, Highway 401	East/West	Parkinson Rd. east of Norwich Ave. in Woodstock
16	Kintore	East/West	
17	Golspie, north of Woodstock	East/West	Tollgate Rd.
18	Mount Elgin, Newark, Norwich	East/West	
19	Ostrander, Springford, Otterville	East/West	
20	Brownsville, Delmer, Tillsonburg	East/West	North St. in Tillsonburg
21	east of Burgessville, north of Norwich	East/West	
22	Bright, Muir	North/South	
23		East/West	short section from CR 22, along Perth County border
24	Tavistock	East/West	
25	Medina, Lakeside	East/West	
26	west of Brownsville	North/South	along Middlesex County border
27	Dereham Centre	East/West	Prouse Rd.
28	Uniondale, Harrington West, Maplewood	East/West	
29	Innerkip, Highway 401, Drumbo	East/West	
30	Woodstock	North/South	11th line
32	near Hawtrey	North/South	at extreme southeast of county, connects CR 37
33	south of Embro, Innerkip	East/West	
34	near Tavistock	North/South	Southwest bypass of Tavistock
35	Woodstock	East/West	The road is Woodstock's Devonshire Ave., runs for 5 km, and has four stoplights, including an intersection with Co.Rd. 4
36	near Paris, Ayr	North/South	Brant Oxford Road, Trussler Road
37	Tillsonburg	East/West	Potter's Rd.
40	Curries	East/West	
41	Sweaburg	North/South	short connector to CR 40
42	Plattsville	East/West	
43	east of Washington	North/South	spur from CR 8 to Perth County
44		East/West	short section from CR 43, along Perth County border
45	south of Thamesford	North/South	
46	Salford, Holbrook	East/West	
51	Tillsonburg	East/West	Simcoe St.
52	Woodstock	North/South	Clarke St. N. (north of Dundas St.)
53	Tillsonburg	North/South	Tillson Ave.
54	Woodstock	North/South	Huron St. (from Devonshire Ave. to Dundas St.)
55	Eastwood, Highway 403, Muir	East/West	formerly Ontario Highway 53
59	Tavistock, Hickson, Strathallan, Huntingford, Woodstock, Highway 401, Curries, Holbrook, Burgessville, Norwich, Milldale	North/South	formerly Ontario Highway 59
119	Uniondale, Medina, Kintore, Thamesford, Ingersoll	North/South	formerly Ontario Highway 19
