= Quaestoriana =

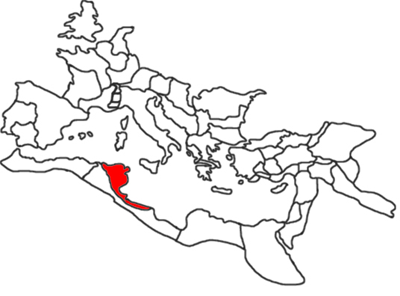
Byzacena in the Roman Empire

Quaestoriana (also spelled Quæstoriana) was an ancient civitas (town) and bishopric in Roman Byzacena(North Africa). Quaestoriana is also a suppressed and titular see of the province of Byzacena (North Africa) in the Roman Catholic Church. The current bishop is Manuel Antonio Valarezo Luzuriaga. Its present location is in modern Tunisia.

== History ==
The exact location of the town is now lost to history though we do know it was a civitas of the Roman Province of Byzacena.

=== Ancient Bishopric ===
Quaestoriana was important enough in the Late Roman province of Byzacena to become one of the many suffragans of its capital Hadrumetum (Sousse)'s Metropolitan Archbishopric but, like most, was to fade. The diocese of Questoriana was in the Roman province of Byzacena.

There are two documented bishops of this diocese:

- Vittoriano, who took part in the synod gathered in conference of 484 in Carthage that was called by the Vandal king Huneric, following which he was exiled;
- Stefano (called from the Beatus sources Stephanus, spes in Deo), who intervened at the Antimonotelite Council of Carthage in 641.

=== Titular see ===
The diocese was nominally restored as titular bishopric in 1933. It has had the following incumbents, of the fitting episcopal (lowest) rank, except the archiepiscopal first:

- Titular Archbishop Jean-Berchmans-Marcel-Yves-Marie-Bernard Chabbert, Friars Minor (O.F.M.) (1967.04.13 – 1968.01.15) as Coadjutor Archbishop of Rabat (Morocco) (1967.04.13 – 1968.01.15), succeeded as Archbishop of Rabat (1968.01.15 – 1982.07.17), later Archbishop-Bishop of Perpignan–Elne (France) (1982.07.17 – 1996.01.16)
- Joseph A. Carroll (1968.10.04 – death 1992.02.29), as Auxiliary Bishop of Dublin (Ireland) (1968.10.04 – 1989.06.15) and as emeritatus
- Michael Neary (1992.05.20 – 1995.01.17), later Metropolitan Archbishop of Tuam (Ireland) (1995.01.17 – ...)
- Manuel Antonio Valarezo Luzuriaga (1996 – ...), O.F.M., Apostolic Vicar emeritus of Galápagos (Ecuador)
