= Carthage, Ontario =

Coordinates: 43°39′41″N 80°51′00″W

Carthage is a community in the Township of Perth East, Perth County, Ontario, Canada. It lies 12 kilometres (7 mi) north of Milverton on Perth County Road 119 at 83rd Line. Tralee is the nearest community, 2.7 kilometres (1.7 mi) north, Burns is 3.4 kilometres (2.1 mi) south, and Hesson is 5.6 kilometres (3.5 mi) east. Smith Creek passes through the community.

== See also ==
- List of unincorporated communities in Ontario
