= Brunner, Ontario =

Human settlement in Ontario, Canada

Coordinates: 43°31′12″N 80°55′21″W

Brunner is a community in the Township of Perth East, Perth County, Ontario, Canada. It lies 17 kilometres (11 mi) north of Stratford on Perth County Road 119. Topping is the nearest community, 4 kilometres (2 mi) east, and Milverton is 5 kilometres (3 mi) north. The Stratford and Huron Railway, later part of Canadian National Railway, passes through the community.
