= Joseph Carroll (bishop) =

Roman Catholic bishop and educator

Bishop Joseph A. Carroll LSS, STL, was a Roman Catholic Irish priest, educator and auxiliary bishop of Dublin.

== Life ==
Joseph Carroll was born on 12 December 1912 in Dublin. He was ordained a priest in 1938 for the Dublin Archdiocese.

He served as a vicar-general of Dublin and president of Clonliffe College, the seminary of the Archdiocese of Dublin, until his appointment as bishop, in 1968, by John Charles McQuaid. He was ordained as Titular Bishop of Quaestoriana.

Bishop Carroll also served as the Dublin archdiocese's administrator.

As President of Clonliffe College in 1966, he was involved in the setting up of the Mater Dei Institute of Education, where he also served as president.

The Murphy report was critical of Bishop Carroll's handling of Child Sex Abuse allegations in the Dublin Diocese

Bishop Caroll retired in 1989 and died on 29 February 1992
