= Perth East, Ontario =

Perth East
- Township (lower-tier)
- Township of Perth East
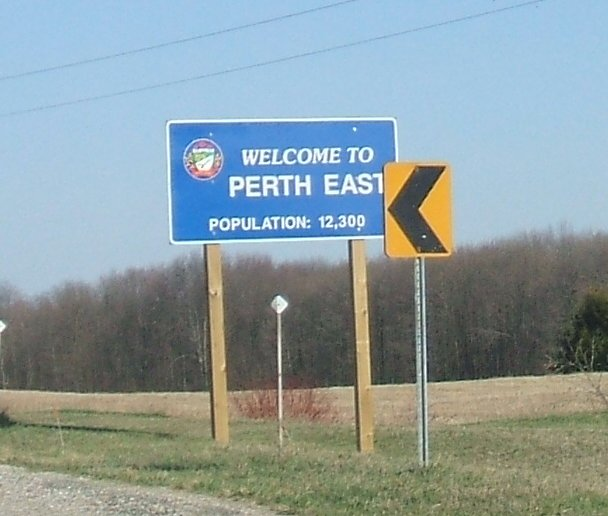

- Location within Perth County Location within Southern Ontario
- Coordinates: 43°28′N 80°57′W
- Country: Canada
- Province: Ontario
- County: Perth
- Formed: January 1, 1998

Government
  - Mayor: Rhonda Ehgoetz
  - Federal riding: Perth Wellington
  - Prov. riding: Perth—Wellington

Area
  - Land: 712.14 km^{2} (274.96 sq mi)

Population (2016)
  - Total: 12,261
  - Density: 17.2/km^{2} (45/sq mi)
- Time zone: UTC-5 (EST)
  - Summer (DST): UTC-4 (EDT)
- Postal Code: N0K
- Area codes: 519, 226, 548
- Website: www.pertheast.on.ca

The Township of Perth East is a municipality in Perth County, Ontario, Canada, situated north of Stratford. It was created in 1998 when the Ontario government amalgamated the village of Milverton with the surrounding former townships of Ellice, Mornington, North Easthope and South Easthope.

Milverton is the largest community of the township, where the municipal administration is based. The mayor is Rhonda Ehgoetz. The population in 2016 was 12,595, with 4,266 occupied private dwellings, in a land area of 711.93 km^{2} (275 sq. mi.).

== History ==
=== Ellice Township ===
In 1829, the first concession in the Township of Ellice was surveyed and opened for settlement. A cairn still stands marking the site of the first home, at Lot 31, Concession 1, owned by Andrew Seebach from Bavaria. (A cairn has been erected to mark the location.) The township was named after Edward Ellice, a director of the Canada Company. The local municipal history began in 1842 when John Sebring was appointed to the position of District Councillor (later classified as a Reeve). The first separate school in the township was opened at Millbrook in 1857 and closed in 1907 when it merged with another local school. In 1908 the Ellice Council purchased the abandoned school and moved it to a site on the County Road where it served as the seat of municipal government until 1960. The building was replaced by the present hall which was built in 1961.

=== Village of Milverton ===
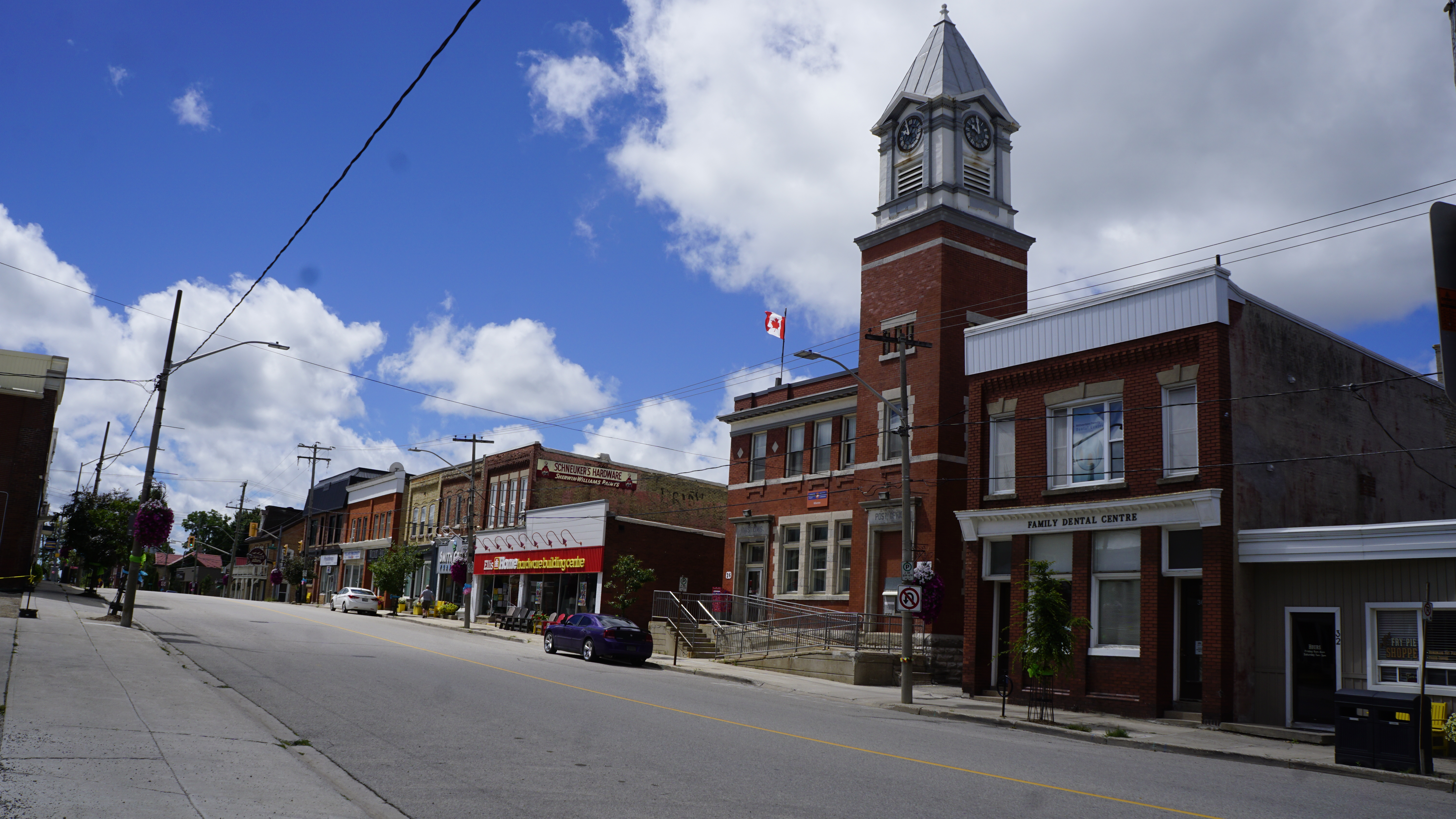
Milverton

The first settler was Andrew West, a shoemaker who settled on a farm and opened a hotel in 1851. Other businesses soon followed and the hamlet of West's Corners in Mornington Township began to expand. The first Post Office was established in 1854 and the first schoolhouse in 1856. By 1864, the settlement contained a sawmill, a tannery, two churches and some 200 residents. In about 1871 the name of the village was changed to Milverton, named after Milverton, Somerset in England.

The Stratford and Huron Railway reached this area in 1877, making it easy to market the area's agricultural products; the population increased afterwards. Effective January 1, 1881, Milverton was incorporated into a village; its population at the time was 550.

=== Village of Shakespeare ===
According to Stratford Heritage, Perth County's first settler was Sebastian Fryfogel from Bavaria, Germany. He first built a log shelter in 1827 while the Canada Company's Huron Road was being surveyed. Still standing, it is part of what is now the village of Shakespeare. In 1844 or 1845, he replaced it with a larger building which served as an inn and stagecoach stop, the Fryfogel Tavern. It maintained this role until about 1856, when the railway became the primary method of transportation. According to Canada's Register of Historic Places, "graves and markers of Sebastian Fryfogel and other Fryfogel family members are located on the property's western portion, as well as a cairn (1928) marking the site's century of occupation".

=== Mornington Township ===
The first Township Council meeting was held in 1854. This, and subsequent meetings were held at taverns throughout the municipality. In 1857, only four years after the township was established, the township clerk was fired - council minutes explain that "the collections roll contained contradicting statements that... money had been collected, the expenditure of which could not be ascertained by the Auditors in a satisfactory manner". In 1876, the Stratford and Huron Railway Company and the township entered into an agreement to bring the railway into the municipality with two stations.

=== North Easthope Township ===
North Easthope Township was named after Sir John Easthope, a Canada Company director. The area was settled around 1832 by two main ethnic groups - Highland Scots and Hessen Darmstadt Deutsch due to the Canada Company's advertisement of the local land in Scottish and German newspapers.

=== South Easthope Township ===
The first settler to Southeast Township moved in on Christmas Day in 1828. In 1863, South Easthope was the smallest township in the area with a population of 2,322 and an areas of 9,759 hectares. Council meetings were held in a room leased at a hotel until 1954 when a township hall was opened. In 1959, a Fire Hall was opened housing a volunteer department of 17 men, two fire trucks and a pumper. This department still exists and serves the communities in North and South Easthope.

=== Municipal Restructuring ===
As part of provincial initiatives in the late 1990s, the Government of Ontario pursued a policy of municipal amalgamations to rationalize municipal levels of government services and "reduc[e] government entanglement and bureaucracy with an eye to eliminating waste and duplication as well as unfair downloading by the province". On June 26, 1997, an order from the Ontario Minister of Municipal Affairs for the amalgamation of the former Townships of Ellice, Mornington, North Easthope, South Easthope and the Village of Milverton into Perth East Township received Royal assent. The amalgamation came into effect on January 1, 1998.

== Geography ==
=== Communities ===
The township comprises the communities of Amulree, Brocksden, Brunner, Burns, Carthage, Dorking, Fernbank, Gads Hill, Hesson, Kinkora, Kuhryville, Mennonite Corner, Millbank, Milverton, Moserville, Newton, Nithburg, Peffers, Poole, Ratzburg, Rostock, Sebastopol, Shakespeare, Topping, Tralee and Wartburg. It also includes a portion of the hamlet of Punkeydoodles Corners, which straddles the municipal boundaries of Perth East, East Zorra – Tavistock and Wilmot.

Milverton was mentioned in the Season 4 episode Old King Clancy of How I Met Your Mother.

=== Ellice Swamp ===
Ellice Swamp is a large woodlot in Perth County, Ontario. The swamp covers approximately 856 hectares (2,115 acres). It is located between Stratford and Milverton in the northeastern portion of the Thames River Watershed, between the North Branch of the Thames and the Nith River. Historically, it was known as Ellice Huckleberry Swamp and was part of the Huron Tract administered by the Canada Company. It is primarily owned by the Upper Thames River Conservation Authority.

== Demographics ==
Historical population
Year	Pop.	±%
2006	11,986	—
2011	12,028	+0.4%
2016	12,261	+1.9%
2021	12,595	+2.7%
Source: 2006 Census of Canada 2011 Census of Canada

In the 2021 Census of Population conducted by Statistics Canada, Perth East had a population of 12,595 living in 4,112 of its 4,266 total private dwellings, a change of 2.6% from its 2016 population of 12,277. With a land area of 711.93 km^{2} (274.88 sq mi), it had a population density of 17.7/km^{2} (45.8/sq mi) in 2021.

In 2011, children aged 9 and under accounted for approximately 15.4% of the population, while the percentage at retirement age (65 and over) is approximately 12.8%. The median age was 36.1 years of age. The average income was $37,303 with an average after-tax income of $32,356.

In 2011, 6.2% of the population had immigrant status. The most common countries immigrants come from are Mexico (28.5%), followed by the Netherlands (16.3%) and Germany (10.8%).

The majority of residents of Perth East are members of a Christian faith and account for 87.5% of the population. Less than 1% of the population is Sikh or "Other religion" with the remaining population (11.8%) reporting no religious affiliation. Of the Christian population, the largest religious affiliation is Roman Catholic (18.5%) followed by Lutheran (15.2%), United Church (11.8%), Presbyterian (1.6%), Anglican (2.4%), Pentecostal (1.4%), Baptist (1.3%) and other Christian (42%).

== Economy ==
The township indicates that economic categories include agriculture, farm-related businesses, millwrighting, metal fabrication, and tourism.

Industrial companies in this area include Iron Bridge Fabrication, Quality Fertilizers, Mornington Communications and Nuhn Industries. Nuhn Industries is a third generation, family owned business founded in 1902. In 2014, the company was planning a 30,000 square foot addition to their 66,000 square foot facility to better serve its customers throughout North America, Latin America, Japan and Africa.

According to the 2011 National Household Survey, the largest economic sectors by number of workers employed are manufacturing (910 workers); construction (710 workers); health care and social assistance (645 workers) and retail trade (600 workers). Other industries in the region employing more than 200 workers are wholesale trade; transportation and warehousing; administrative and support, waste management and remediation services; accommodation and food services; and public administration.

== Local government ==
Perth East Township is governed by a Township Council composed of seven members including a Mayor, Deputy Mayor and five Councillors. Councillors represent the wards of Ellice, Milverton, Mornington, North Easthope and South Easthope.

Township operations are overseen by the Chief Administrator's Office and municipal departments include Building, Clerk's Office, Finance, Fire Services, Library Services, Planning, Public Works, and Recreation.

=== Township Council 2018-2022 ===
Position	Name
Mayor	Rhonda Ehgoetz
Deputy Mayor	Hugh McDermid
Councillor - Ellice	Amanda Brodhagen
Councillor - Milverton	Jerry Smith
Councillor - Mornington	Jeremy Matheson
Councillor - North Easthope	Daryl Herlick
Councillor - South Easthope	Andrew B. MacAlpine

=== County government ===
Because the Perth East is part of the upper-tier municipality Perth County, Ontario, it has representation on the County Council. The Perth County Council is determined by a restructuring order that came into force on January 1, 1998. That Council is made up of representatives from the four Perth Townships. The head of County Council is elected from among the council members annually, by a vote at council and is known as the Warden. In 2018–2019, the Perth County Warden is Walter McKenzie from West Perth.

Perth East Mayor Rhonda Ehgoetz, Deputy Mayor Hugh McDermid, and Councillor Daryl Herlick serve as Perth East's representatives on County Council.

=== Provincial Government ===
Perth—Wellington is a provincial electoral district in Ontario, Canada, that has been represented in the Legislative Assembly of Ontario since the 2007 provincial election. It was created in 2003 from parts of Dufferin—Peel—Wellington—Grey, Perth—Middlesex and Waterloo—Wellington ridings.

It consists of the County of Perth, and the Town of Minto and the townships of Mapleton and Wellington North in the County of Wellington. As of June 2, 2022, the MPP for the riding is Matthew Rae.

Perth—Wellington
Assembly	Years	Member	Party
Riding created from Dufferin—Peel—Wellington—Grey, Perth—Middlesex and Waterloo—Wellington
39th	2007–2011	John Wilkinson	Liberal
40th	2011–2014	Randy Pettapiece	Progressive Conservative
41st	2014–2018	Randy Pettapiece	Progressive Conservative
42nd	2018–2022	Randy Pettapiece	Progressive Conservative
43rd	2022–Present	Matthew Rae	Progressive Conservative

=== Federal government ===
Perth—Wellington is a federal electoral district in Ontario, Canada, that has been represented in the House of Commons of Canada since 2004. The riding was created in 2003 from parts of Perth—Middlesex (76%), Waterloo—Wellington (17%) and Dufferin—Peel—Wellington—Grey (7%) ridings. It did not undergo any boundary changes in the 2012 electoral redistribution.

It consists of the County of Perth, the City of Stratford, the Town of St. Mary's and the Town of Minto and the townships of Mapleton and Wellington North in the County of Wellington.

Since 2015, the MP for this riding has been John Nater (PC).

== See also ==
- List of townships in Ontario
