= Serafín Cartagena Ocaña =

Ecuadorian Roman Catholic bishop (1924–2026)

The Most Reverend Serafín Cartagena Ocaña O.F.M.
- Apostolic Vicar of Zamora
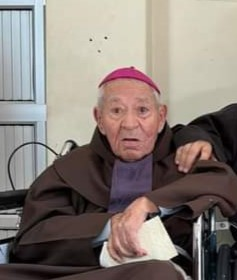
- Appointed: 10 September 1982
- Term ended: 1 February 2003
- Predecessor: Jorge Francisco Mosquera Barreiro
- Successor: Fausto Gabriel Trávez Trávez
- Other post: Titular Bishop of Gibba (1982–2026)
- Previous post: Apostolic Prefect of Galápagos (1980–1982)

Orders
- Ordination: 1 April 1951 by Carlos María de la Torre
- Consecration: 2 February 1983 by Vincenzo Maria Farano

Personal details
- Born: Luis Alberto Cartagena Ocaña; 7 November 1924 Tixán, Riobamba Canton, Ecuador
- Died: 16 January 2026 (aged 101) Guayaquil, Ecuador
- Motto: Dios mío y mi todo

Serafín Luis Alberto Cartagena Ocaña O.F.M. (7 November 1924 – 16 January 2026) was an Ecuadorian Roman Catholic prelate who was consecrated a bishop in 1983 and served as the vicar apostolic of Zamora in Ecuador from 1982 to 2003. He was the prefect apostolic of Galápagos from 1980 to 1982.

== Early life ==
Cartagena was born on 7 November 1924, in Tixán, in the Ecuadorian Riobamba Canton and baptised as Luis Alberto. His parents were from Riobamba. He spent his childhood in Tixán. His father died in Guayaquil during surgery when he was five years old, and he returned with his mother to Riobamba.

While still young he joined the Order of Friars Minor in Quito, changed his name to Serafín, and after studying at the Franciscan Theological Seminary in Quito was ordained a priest on 1 April 1951. In July that year, he celebrated his first Mass in his hometown. His mother died a month later. In December he was sent as a missionary to Zamora-Chinchipe Province.

== Prelate ==
On 17 May 1980, he was appointed by Pope John Paul II as Prefect Apostolic of Apostolic Prefecture Galápagos. On 10 September 1982, he was named titular bishop of Gibba and Apostolic Vicar of Zamora in Ecuador. He was consecrated a bishop on 2 February 1983 at the Basilica and Convent of San Francisco in Quito by Archbishop Vincenzo Maria Farano.

On 1 February 2003, Pope John Paul accepted his resignation as Apostolic Vicar of Zamora, appointing his successor at the same time.

== Death ==
Cartagena Ocaña died at a retirement home, the Convent of San Francisco, in Guayaquil, on 16 January 2026. He was 101.

Catholic Church titles
Preceded by James Hector MacDonald	Titular Bishop of Gibba; 1982–2026	Succeeded by Vacant
Preceded by Jorge Francisco Mosquera Barreiro	Apostolic Vicar of Zamora; 1982–2003	Succeeded by Fausto Gabriel Trávez Trávez
Preceded by Edgar Pinto Espin	Apostolic Prefect of Galápagos; 1980–1982	Succeeded by Bernardino Echeverría Ruiz
