= San Cristóbal Island =

Easternmost island in the Galápagos archipelago

San Cristóbal Island (Chatham Island)
- Location within Galápagos Islands

Geography
- Location: Galápagos Islands, Ecuador
- Coordinates: 0.83°S 89.43°W
- Archipelago: Galápagos Islands
- Area: 558 km^{2} (215 sq mi)
- Highest elevation: 713 m (2339 ft)
- Highest point: Cerro San Joaquin

Administration
- Ecuador

Demographics
- Population: 6,000

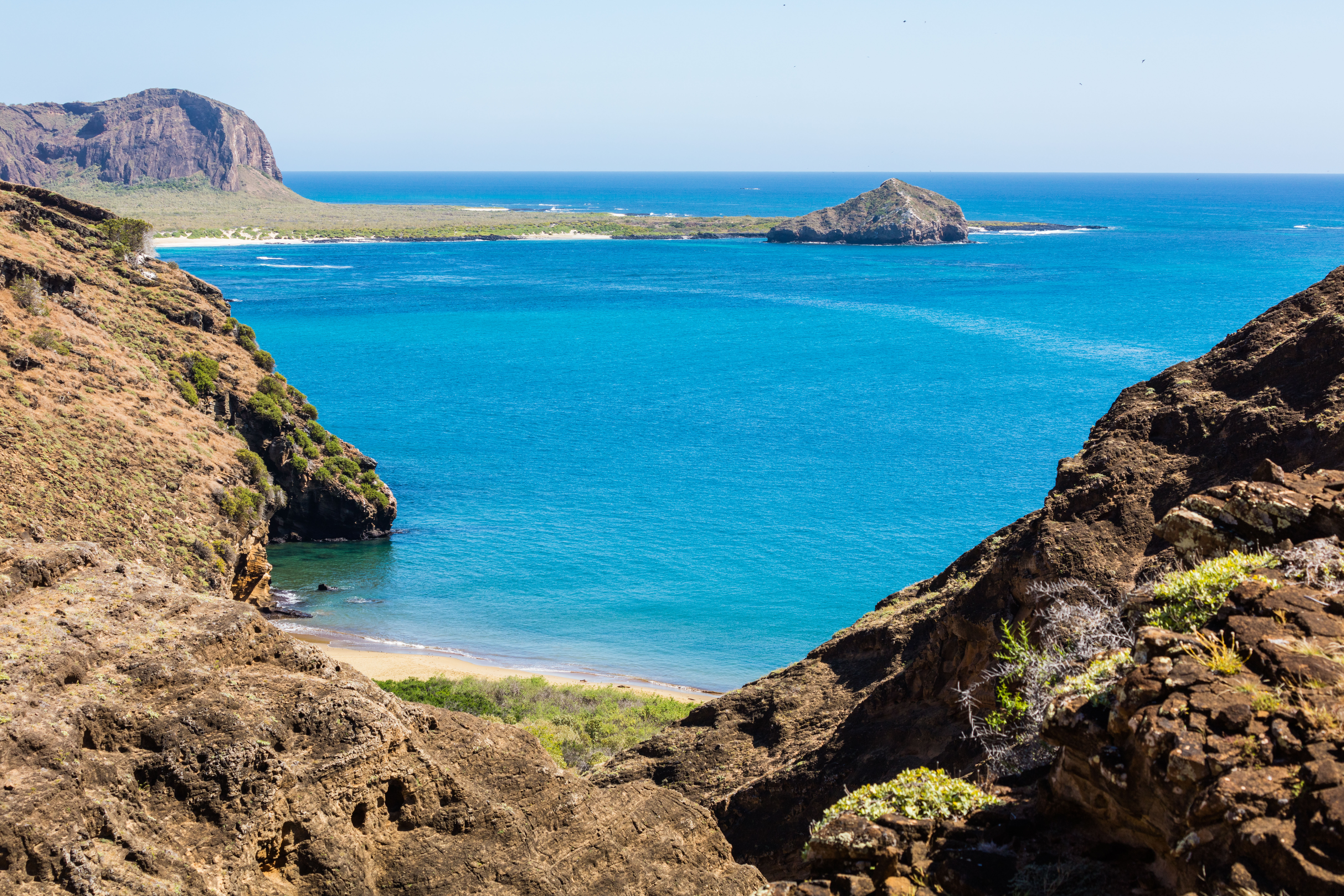
Landscape in Punta Pitt, San Cristóbal Island.

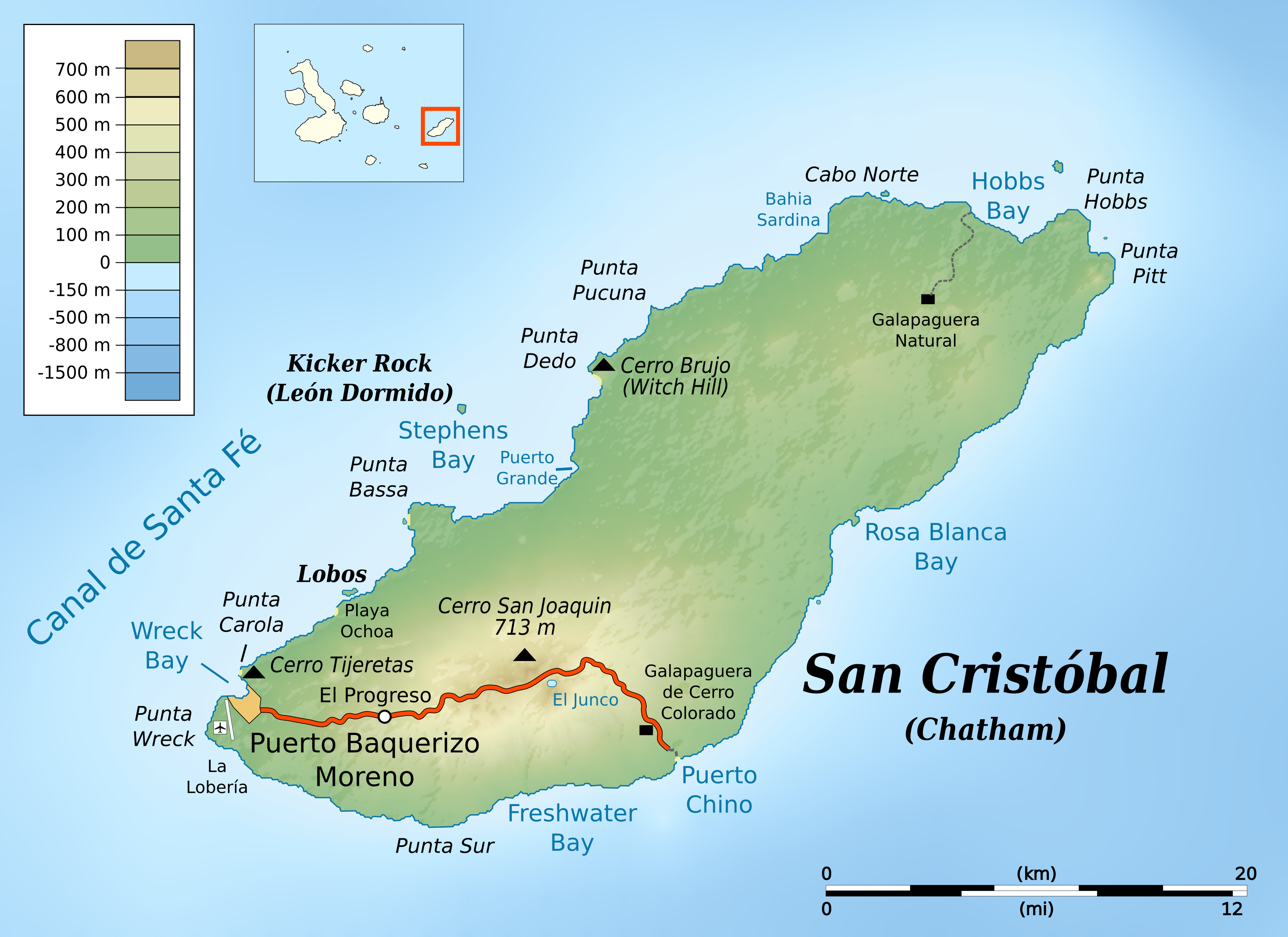
Topographic map

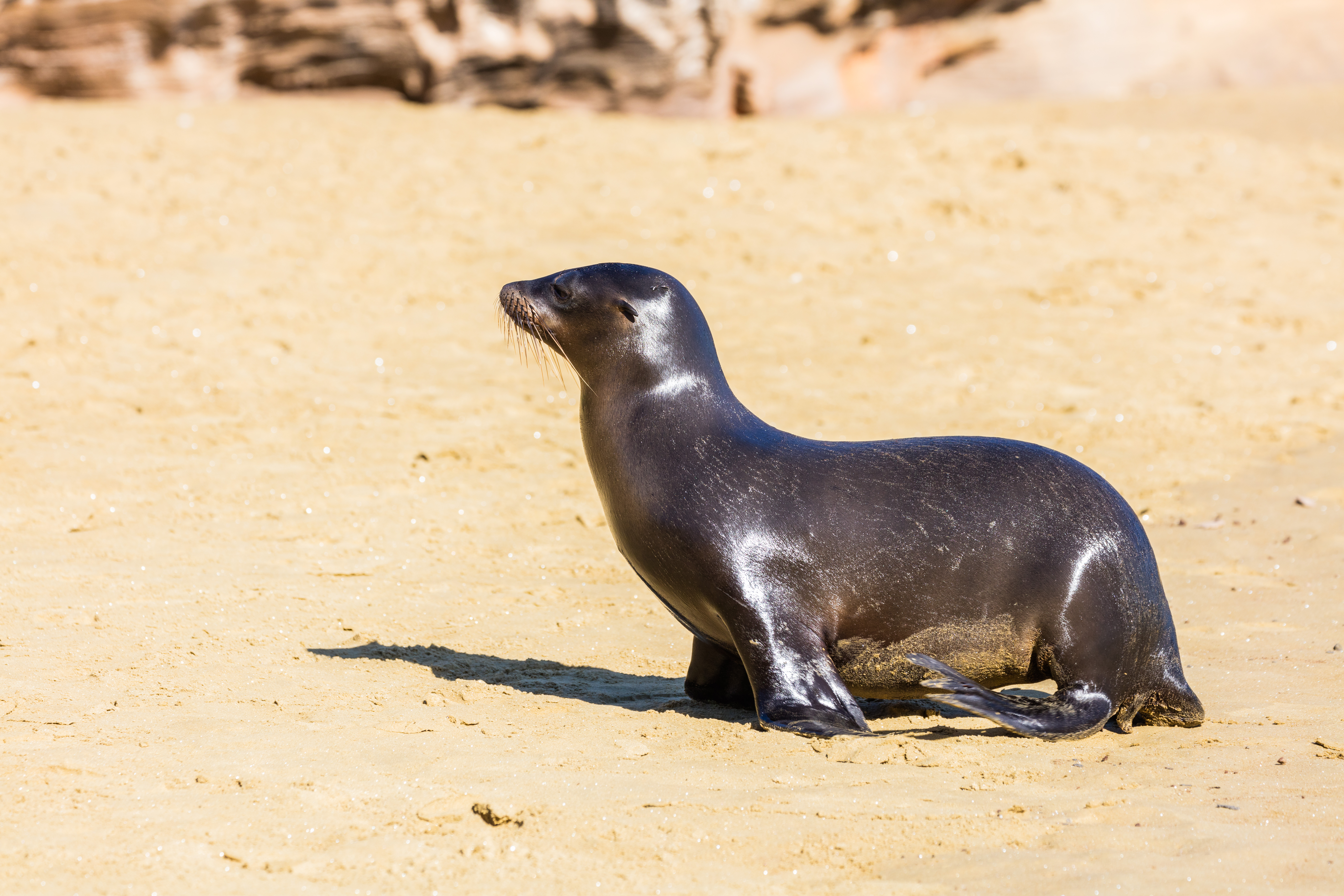
Young sea lion (Zalophus californianus wollebaeki), Punta Pitt.

San Cristóbal Island (Spanish: Isla San Cristóbal), also known as Chatham Island, is the easternmost island in the Galápagos archipelago, as well as one of the oldest geologically. It is administratively part of San Cristóbal Canton, Ecuador.

== Names ==
San Cristóbal is Spanish for Saint Christopher, reckoned in Catholicism as the patron saint of sailors.

The English pirate William Ambrosia Cowley named it Dassigney's Island in 1684, later shortened to Dassigney or Dassigny Island, in honor of Philip Dassigny, the member of Bartholomew Sharp's crew who translated the Spanish atlas that saved the captain from being hanged for piracy. The British captain James Colnett renamed it Lord Chatham Island in 1793 after John Pitt, 2nd Earl of Chatham and First Lord of the Admiralty, on the specious claim it had never been previously charted. Colnett also named Kicker Rock, which lies in Stephens Bay, on the western side of the island. That name is thought to be a reference to two English navigational towers, Kickergill and Gilkicker, that were erected in Hampshire, England in the 17th century, to help ships navigate the entrance to Portsmouth Harbour.

== History ==
San Cristobal Island is composed of three or four fused volcanoes, all extinct. It is home to the oldest permanent settlement of the islands and is the island where Darwin first went ashore in 1835. A small lake called El Junco is the only source of fresh water in the islands. The availability of fresh water is what led to the early settlement of San Cristobal. A penal colony was built on San Cristóbal Island in 1880 for prisoners from mainland Ecuador. This later turned into a military base for Ecuador and export center for the island's products including sugar, coffee, cassava, cattle, fish and lime.

In April 1888 USS Albatross, a Navy-crewed research vessel assigned to the United States Fish Commission, made landfall at an abandoned settlement on Charles Island.

== Geography ==
San Cristóbal has an area of 558 km^{2} (215 mi^{2}) and its highest point rises to 730 metres (2,400 ft). The population is approximately 6000. San Cristóbal is the most fertile island of the archipelago and is the second most populated after Santa Cruz. The capital of the archipelago, Puerto Baquerizo Moreno, lies at the south-western tip of the island.

== Air transport ==
The island is served by San Cristóbal Airport, with daily flights from Quito and Guayaquil.

== Ecology ==
This island hosts frigatebirds, Galápagos sea lions, Galápagos tortoises, Nazca, blue and red footed boobies, tropicbirds, marine iguanas, dolphins and swallow-tailed gulls. It has been recognized as an Important Bird Area (IBA) by BirdLife International. Its vegetation includes Calandrinia galapagosa, Lecocarpus darwinii, trees such as Lignum vitae, Matazarna. In the waters nearby are sharks, rays, and lobsters.

Terrestrial birds include mangrove warbler, small and medium ground finch, Galapagos flycatcher, grey warbler finch, common cactus finch, small tree finch, woodpecker finch, and the endemic San Cristóbal Mockingbird.

The largest fresh water lake in the archipelago, Laguna El Junco, is located in a crater in the highlands of San Cristóbal, in the southern half of the island. The lake harbors a large population of birdlife, but reaching the lake requires a short uphill walk. Nearby, La Galapaguera is a breeding station and sanctuary for giant tortoises.

== Economy ==
Most inhabitants of San Cristóbal Island make their living in government, tourism, and fishing. The majority of the residents of San Cristóbal live in the port city of Puerto Baquerizo Moreno, which is the capital of Ecuador′s Galápagos Province. Island tourism sites nearer the town of Puerto Baquerizo Moreno include the Cerro Tijeretas, a nesting colony for frigate birds, and a statue of Charles Darwin, marking the original site where he first disembarked in the Galápagos Islands during the second voyage of HMS Beagle on 16 September 1835. La Loberia, a colony of sea lions, lies about ten minutes by bus from the town.

Local boat tours also take visitors to two popular nearby dive sites. "Kicker Rock" (the Spanish name is "León Dormido") is the remains of a lava cone, now split in two. Isla Lobos ("Sea Lion Island") is also a nesting site for blue-footed boobies.

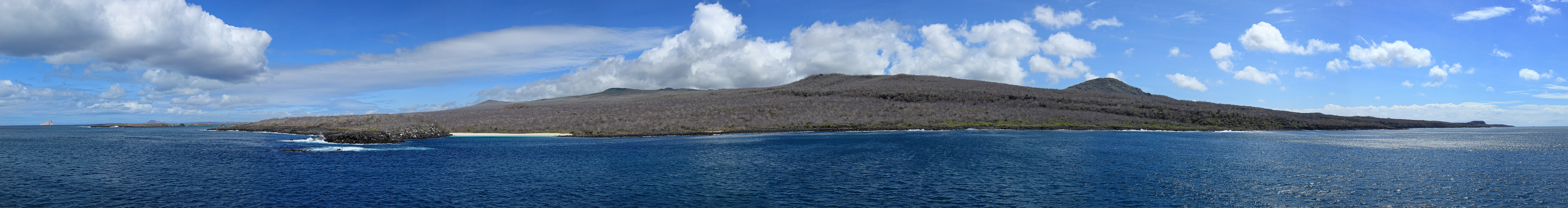
Panorama from the West

== Climate ==
San Cristóbal Island has a tropical climate with warm, dry winters and hot, humid summers with more precipitation than in winter.

Climate data for San Cristóbal Island, 1981–2010 normals
Month	Jan	Feb	Mar	Apr	May	Jun	Jul	Aug	Sep	Oct	Nov	Dec	Year
Mean daily maximum °C (°F)	29.2 (84.6)	30.3 (86.5)	30.5 (86.9)	30.2 (86.4)	29.2 (84.6)	27.6 (81.7)	26.4 (79.5)	25.6 (78.1)	25.7 (78.3)	26.0 (78.8)	27.0 (80.6)	27.8 (82.0)	28.0 (82.3)
Daily mean °C (°F)	26.1 (79.0)	26.7 (80.1)	26.7 (80.1)	26.5 (79.7)	25.9 (78.6)	24.7 (76.5)	23.5 (74.3)	22.7 (72.9)	22.8 (73.0)	23.0 (73.4)	23.9 (75.0)	24.8 (76.6)	24.8 (76.6)
Mean daily minimum °C (°F)	22.9 (73.2)	23.1 (73.6)	22.9 (73.2)	22.8 (73.0)	22.7 (72.9)	21.7 (71.1)	20.7 (69.3)	19.8 (67.6)	19.8 (67.6)	20.0 (68.0)	20.9 (69.6)	21.7 (71.1)	21.6 (70.9)
Average precipitation mm (inches)	83.4 (3.28)	107.4 (4.23)	106.3 (4.19)	94.9 (3.74)	41.9 (1.65)	32.5 (1.28)	18.8 (0.74)	9.8 (0.39)	7.6 (0.30)	11.0 (0.43)	12.6 (0.50)	51.5 (2.03)	577.7 (22.76)
Average precipitation days	11	10	11	6	5	8	13	14	12	11	8	10	119
Source: World Meteorological Organization

The following table shows the variation of precipitation in different places of Santa Cruz Island:

Location	Charles Darwin Station	Devine Farm	Media Luna
Altitude	6 m	320 m	620 m
January	23.0 mm	78.0 mm	172.6 mm
February	16.8 mm	155.2 mm	117.0 mm
March	249.0 mm	920.8 mm	666.7 mm
April	68.5 mm	79.5 mm	166.4 mm
May	31.4 mm	214.6 mm	309.8 mm
June	16.8 mm	147.3 mm	271.8 mm
July	12.0 mm	42.2 mm	135.6 mm
August	3.8 mm	13.7 mm	89.5 mm
September	18.5 mm	90.9 mm	282.6 mm
October	3.2 mm	22.6 mm	96.5 mm
November	11.0 mm	52.8 mm	172.7 mm
December	15.7 mm	84.1 mm	175.3 mm
TOTALS	469.7 mm	1901.7 mm	2656.4 mm
