= Puerto Baquerizo Moreno =

- City
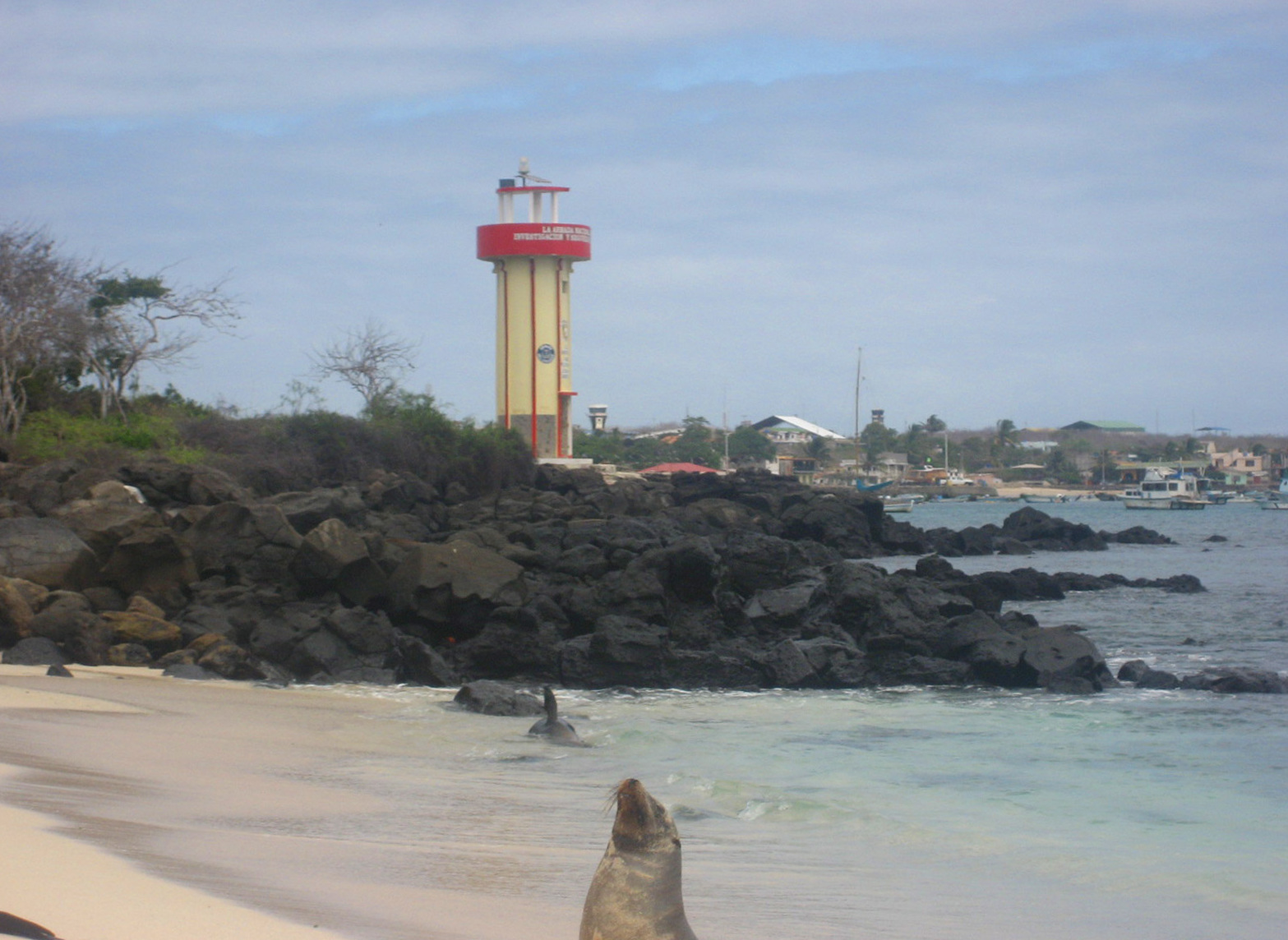
- The shoreline of Puerto Baquerizo with a sea lion in the foreground
- Motto: "Capital del Paraíso" - "Paradise's Capital"
- Location within Galápagos Islands
- Coordinates: 00°54′09″S 89°36′33″W
- Country: Ecuador
- Province: Galápagos
- Canton: San Cristóbal

Government
  - Mayor: Ab. Pedro Zapata

Area
  - City: 2.75 km^{2} (1.06 sq mi)
- Elevation: 6 m (20 ft)

Population (2022 census)
  - City: 7,290
  - Density: 2,650/km^{2} (6,870/sq mi)
- Time zone: UTC-6
- Climate: BSh
- Website: www.sancristobalgalapagos.gov.ec (in Spanish)

Puerto Baquerizo Moreno (Spanish pronunciation: [ˈpweɾto βakeˈɾiso moˈɾeno]) is the capital of Galápagos Province, Ecuador. It is located on the southwestern coast of San Cristóbal, the easternmost island in the archipelago, and is the capital of San Cristóbal Canton. It was founded by General Villamil Playas in the mid-19th century, and takes its name from President Alfredo Baquerizo (1859–1951). Today, fishing is the main activity of the locals, but tourism is on the increase along the waterfront with numerous hotels and shops.

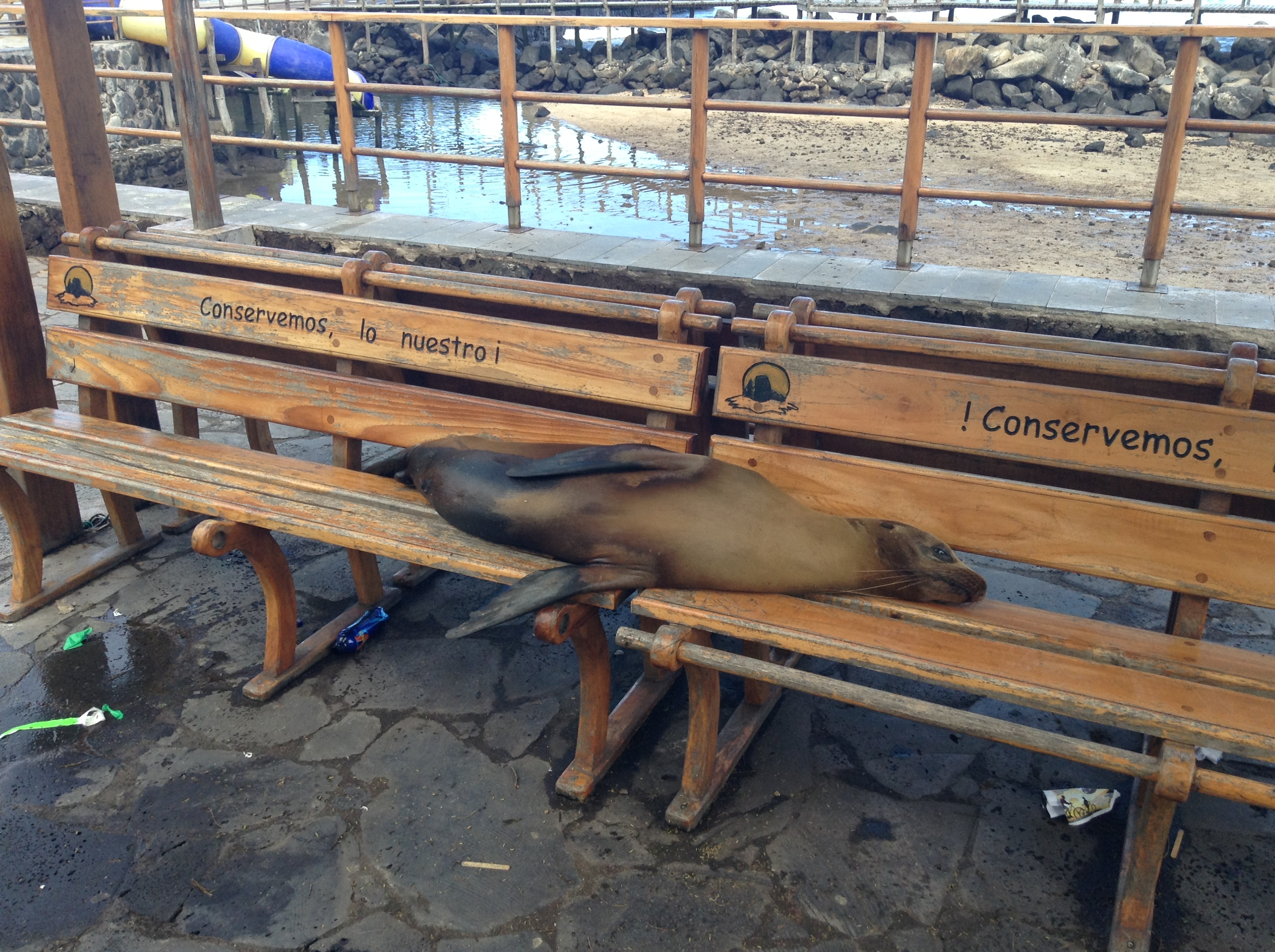
Adult Galápagos sea lion resting on a park bench in Puerto Baquerizo Moreno.

The town has a cathedral, a post office, police station, a hospital, and a branch of the Universidad San Francisco de Quito. It also contains the Centro de Interpretación of the Galápagos National Park, which was established in 1988, and a natural history museum. It is served by San Cristóbal Airport, which connects to mainland Ecuador.

== History ==
General José de Villamil founded the town in the 1830s or 1840s, but it takes its name from Alfredo Baquerizo (1859–1951), the first president to visit during his presidency, in 1916. The Governor of Galápagos resides in the city. The Governor's residence is a prominent grey stone edifice which also houses the Naval headquarters, and is 0.2 miles (0.32 km) west-northwest of the church.

Puerto Baquerizo Moreno is the oldest settlement in the Galápagos Islands. The El Progreso agricultural centre, located about 8 kilometres (5.0 mi) from the town, was established in 1879 as a Hacienda Progreso. It had a large sugar refinery which was operated under harsh conditions, and two assassinations occurred there. Other manufacturing included leather and oil products.

The Albatross Foundation USA or Fundación Ecológica Albatros is a NGO established in 1993 at the initiative of the people of the town with the objective of educating the young people of the country in the importance of preserving and conserving the island's environment and ecosystems.

According to the 2010 census, the town had a population of 6,672 inhabitants, next to that of Puerto Ayora.

== Geography ==
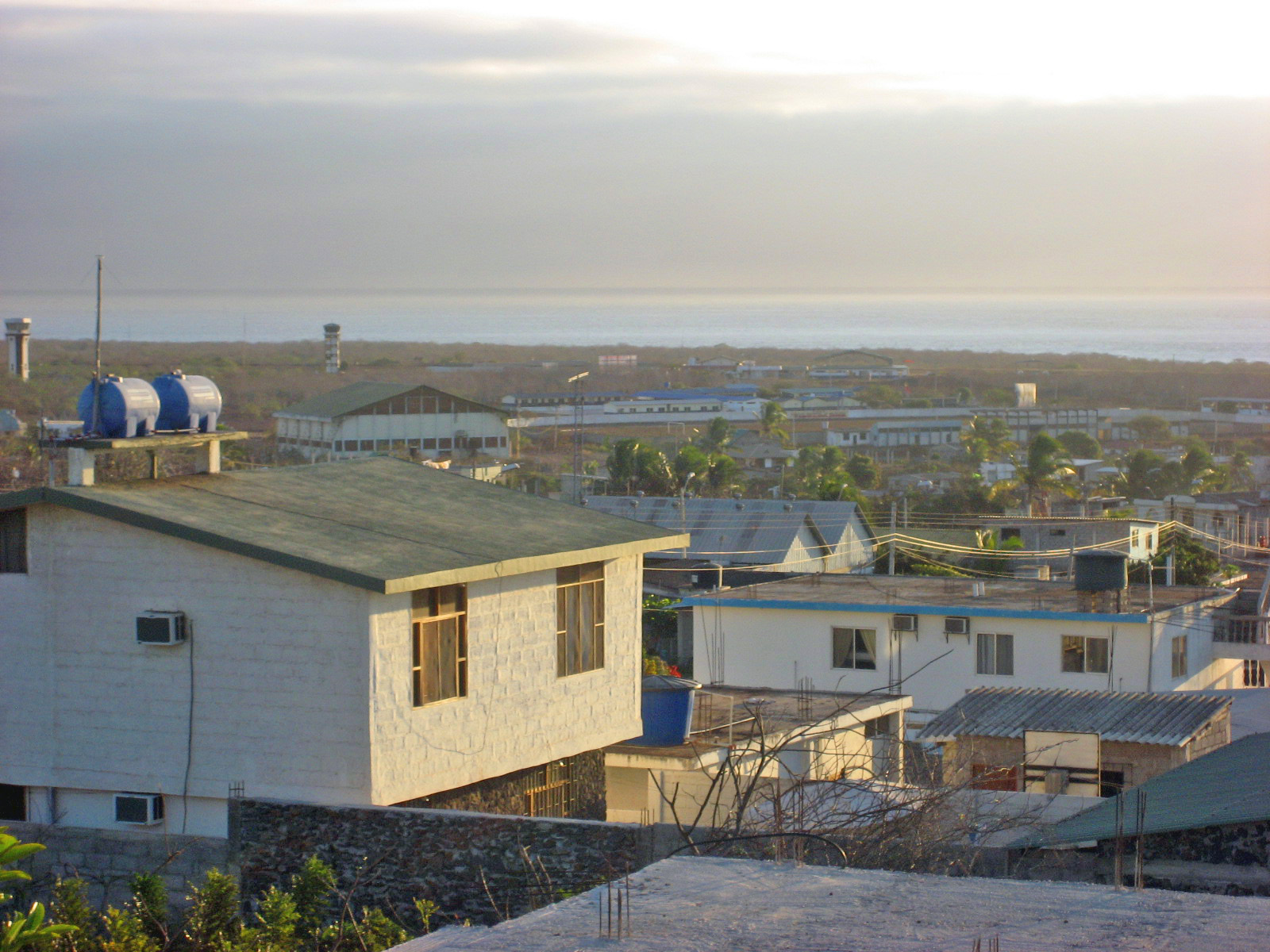
Typical view of the town

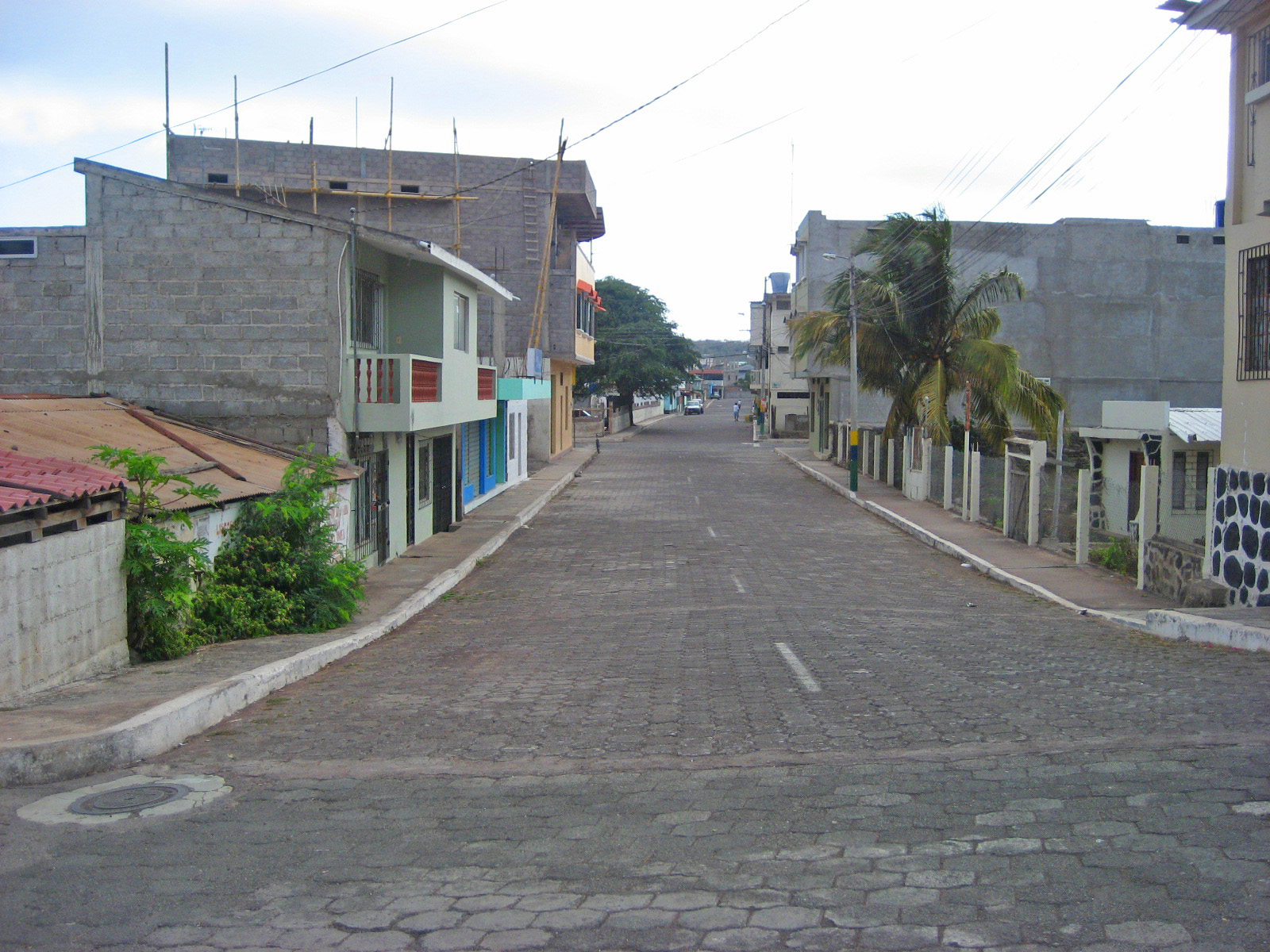
Street scene

Puerto Baquerizo Moreno is the capital and administrative centre of Ecuador's Galápagos Province. It is located on the southwestern coast of San Cristóbal, and the town is also nicknamed Cristóbal by the local people, after the island. Its average elevation is 6 metres (20 ft). The central part of the town, including the road to El Progreso, has paved roads. The headquarters of the navy and the national police are located in the town. Like the rest of Ecuador, it does not have a post office (There is a restaurant named post office), police station and hospital. A branch campus of Universidad San Francisco de Quito is situated in the town.

There is a small beach in the town which is exclusively reserved for the sea lions that inhabit the area and are revered by the local people. There are two more beaches to the north of the town, the Playa Mann and Playa Carola, which are open to the public. The sea lions can be seen lounging on the decks of the anchored boats and have taken over park benches.

The town is situated at the foot of the Cerro San Joaquin mountain, which has an elevation of 896 metres (2,940 ft) making it the highest mountain on San Cristóbal. Cerro de las Tijeretas (Frigatebird Hill) is located 1 mile (1.6 km) southeast of the town. The 1.5 kilometres (0.93 mi) walk to it passes through a thickly-vegetated area consisting of aromatic palo santo trees. The hill is well known for the two species of black frigatebirds, which often visit. The summit provides views of the shipping vessels in Bahía Naufragio (Shipwreck Bay). Tongo Reef is located to the west of the town. It is popular for surfing from December to February, during the warm-wet season. There is a well-protected cove known as Puerto Grande on the northwestern part of the town which has a white sandy beach where swimming is permitted. Tijeretas Cove, which is approached along a trail, is popular for snorkelling.

=== Climate ===
Puerto Baquerizo Moreno has a steppe or hot semi-arid climate (Köppen: BSh).

Despite being an equatorial region, the temperatures in the town and the surrounding area never reach the heights expected for such an equatorial location. Temperatures remain similar year-round, fluctuating only several degrees from January means to July means. However, two seasons predominate: the warm rainy climate from January to March, and the cooler, dry season that lasts from June to November and brings continuous fog-like rain known as garúa, mild to warm temperatures, and mainly overcast skies. There are also constant winds that increase the chill factor.

As San Cristóbal and other islands of the archipelago fall under the dry zone of the equatorial Pacific, they experience lesser rainfall compared to areas in the northern and southern regions. On an average, the entire archipelago receives less than 75 centimetres (30 in) of rainfall per year, and the annual rainfall also varies substantially from year to year. At Puerto Baquerizo Moreno, records indicate that while rainfall in 1950 was only 3.55 centimetres (1.40 in) for the year, during the El Niño year of 1953 it received a total rainfall of 141.9 centimetres (55.9 in). The wet season lasts roughly from December to March, and brings an abundance of bright sunshine along with sporadically brief, yet often intense, tropical thunderstorms. Annual average precipitation amounts to approximately 451 mm (17.76 in), 86% of which falls in the five-month wet season period spanning December till May. Precipitation falls on an average of 107 days a year (precipitation ≥ 0.004" / 0.1 mm).

All of these characteristics are because of the presence of the cold Humboldt Current that flows north from Peru and Chile. Under the effects of this current the ocean waters of the islands remain cold. The Humboldt Current is succeeded by the warm El Niño current, which is a phenomenon that is reported to influence climatic condition in the whole of South Pacific, and sometimes globally.

The mean monthly temperature is 24 °C (75 °F) and the average monthly variation is 7.2 °C (13.0 °F). The daily average maximum temperature is 30 °C (86 °F) from February to April. The daily average minimum temperature is 18 °C (64 °F) in September. There are 2343 sunshine hours in an average year.

Climate data for Puerto Baquerizo Moreno, San Cristobal, Galapagos Islands, Ecuador
| Month | Jan | Feb | Mar | Apr | May | Jun | Jul | Aug | Sep | Oct | Nov | Dec | Year |
|---|---|---|---|---|---|---|---|---|---|---|---|---|---|
| Record high °C (°F) | 32.4 (90.3) | 33.6 (92.5) | 34.2 (93.6) | 33.8 (92.8) | 32.6 (90.7) | 31.6 (88.9) | 30.9 (87.6) | 30.0 (86.0) | 28.8 (83.8) | 29.4 (84.9) | 30.4 (86.7) | 30.2 (86.4) | 34.2 (93.6) |
| Mean daily maximum °C (°F) | 29.2 (84.6) | 30.3 (86.5) | 30.5 (86.9) | 30.2 (86.4) | 29.2 (84.6) | 27.6 (81.7) | 26.4 (79.5) | 25.6 (78.1) | 25.7 (78.3) | 26.0 (78.8) | 27.0 (80.6) | 27.8 (82.0) | 28.0 (82.4) |
| Mean daily minimum °C (°F) | 22.9 (73.2) | 23.1 (73.6) | 22.9 (73.2) | 22.8 (73.0) | 22.7 (72.9) | 21.7 (71.1) | 20.7 (69.3) | 19.8 (67.6) | 19.8 (67.6) | 20.0 (68.0) | 20.9 (69.6) | 21.7 (71.1) | 21.6 (70.9) |
| Record low °C (°F) | 17.2 (63.0) | 16.2 (61.2) | 18.1 (64.6) | 17.7 (63.9) | 16.0 (60.8) | 15.2 (59.4) | 13.2 (55.8) | 14.0 (57.2) | 13.5 (56.3) | 14.6 (58.3) | 15.4 (59.7) | 16.2 (61.2) | 13.2 (55.8) |
| Average precipitation mm (inches) | 83.4 (3.28) | 107.4 (4.23) | 106.3 (4.19) | 94.9 (3.74) | 41.9 (1.65) | 32.5 (1.28) | 18.8 (0.74) | 9.8 (0.39) | 7.6 (0.30) | 11.0 (0.43) | 12.6 (0.50) | 51.5 (2.03) | 577.7 (22.74) |
| Average precipitation days | 11 | 10 | 11 | 6 | 5 | 8 | 13 | 14 | 12 | 11 | 8 | 10 | 119 |
| Average relative humidity (%) | 80 | 82 | 82 | 82 | 80 | 78 | 78 | 79 | 78 | 77 | 74 | 76 | 79 |
| Mean monthly sunshine hours | 156 | 158 | 175 | 180 | 191 | 166 | 152 | 148 | 151 | 157 | 166 | 168 | 1,968 |
Source 1: World Meteorological Organization
Source 2: Deutscher Wetterdienst (extremes, humidity and sun) (Note: Station ID for San Cristobal Radiosonda (Galapagos) is 84008 Use this station ID to locate the sunshine duration)

=== Flora and fauna ===
Lava fields and desert plants are profuse in the environs of the town. The invasive species of plants which grow profusely around the highlands at the periphery of the town are quinine tree, Cuban cedar and tall elephant grass.

== Economy ==
Fishing is a major economic activity of the town. As of 2014, some 520 fishermen operate from the port with 212 fishing vessels of varying sizes. Agriculture is practised marginally as there is little water on the island and the community feels that plying their boats for tourism is more economical. Drinking water supply to the town is piped from a lake near El Progreso, which also provides irrigation to lands in its vicinity. The electricity supply is continuous.

Tourism is now on the rise on the coast of the town, and has brought its related infrastructure such as hotels, restaurants, souvenir shops, and tourists offices.

== Landmarks ==
There are several important landmarks in the town such as the Centro de Interpretación of the Galápagos National Park, the La Inmaculada cathedral, and a museum. A Charles Darwin Research substation was established in the town in 1998 and includes five administrative units dealing with marine biology, entomology, environmental education, communication and agriculture. Cine Naval, located within the naval station but open to the public, is the only cinema in the town, and every year, in July, holds a cinema festival of Ecuadorian and Latin American films under the auspices of the Spanish government.

=== Centro de Interpretación ===
The Centro de Interpretación (national park visitor centre) is a branch of the Galápagos National Park. It was established in 1988 in the northern part of the town. It contains exhibits related to the biodiversity and anthropology of the islands. Educational presentations are interactive audio and video, which pertain to ecology and are presented in English and Spanish. The exhibits deal with the well-recorded history of the archipelago, its ecology, flora and fauna. The main hall also features rotating exhibitions, in addition to cultural events and workshops on dance and painting. There are many cacti and local flora on the land surrounding the centre, which can be viewed along the board walks. The centre also has a unique display of a rebuilt ship's hold filled with upturned giant tortoises, which represents the way in which they were transported by pirates and whalers.

=== Catedral La Inmaculada ===
The Immaculate Conception Cathedral is a Roman Catholic church located in the centre of Puerto Baquerizo Moreno, which serves as the episcopal seat of the Apostolic Vicariate of Galápagos. It features murals which depict stories from the New Testament in a setting with indigenous animals and plants.

=== Natural History Museum ===
The small Natural History Museum (Museo de Ciencias Naturales) has a statue of Charles Darwin at the entrance. It is located in the heart of the town to the east of the Parque la Carolina, next to the Franciscan mission. It contains exhibits of many animals, plants and minerals of the Galápagos. Of note is a giant tortoise, which is said to be more than 80 years old; an exhibit of a predecessor species of iguana; the flightless cormorant; and the Galapagos tortoise – three drawings for each of these fauna are on display.

== Transportation ==
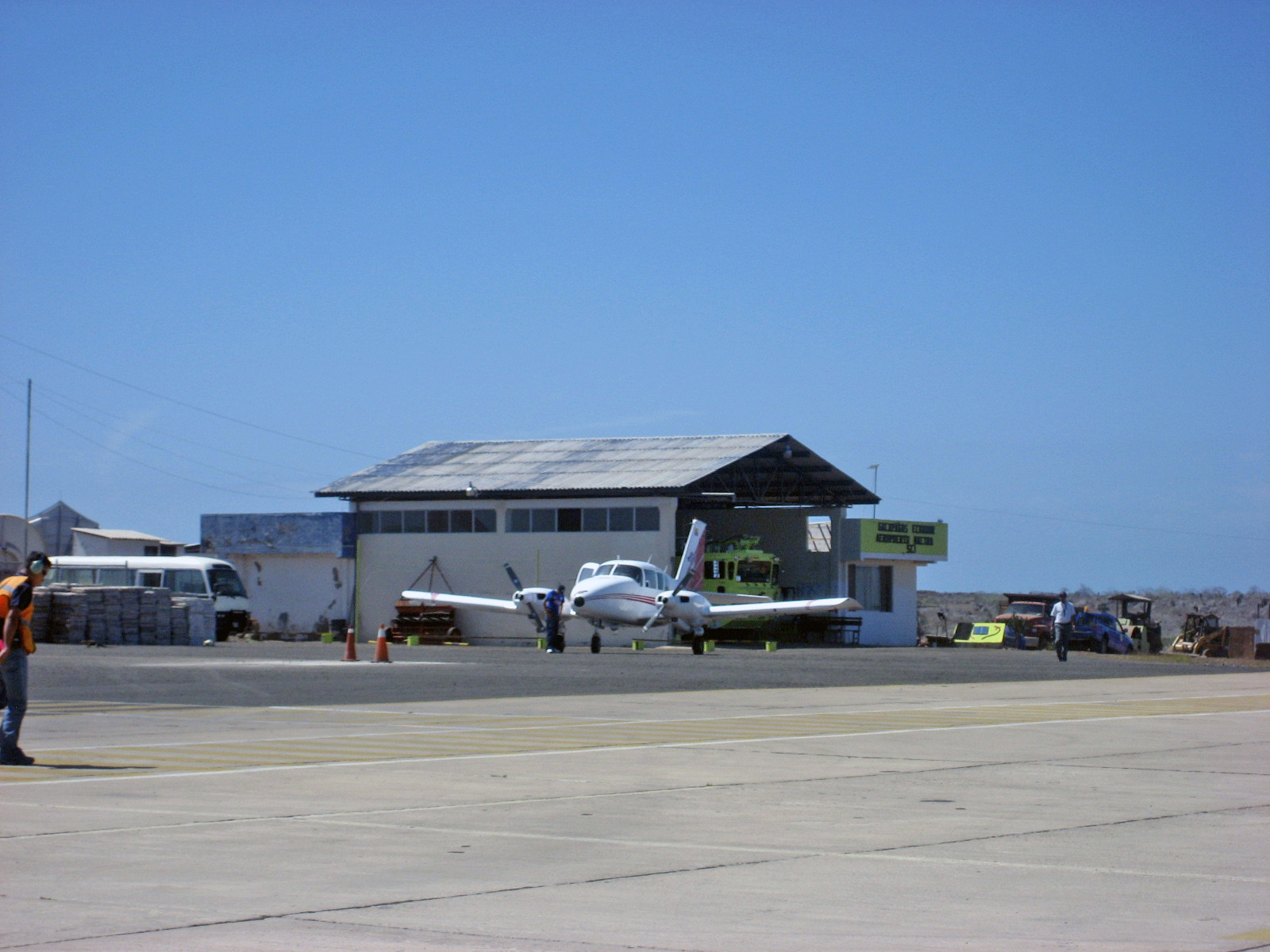
The airport

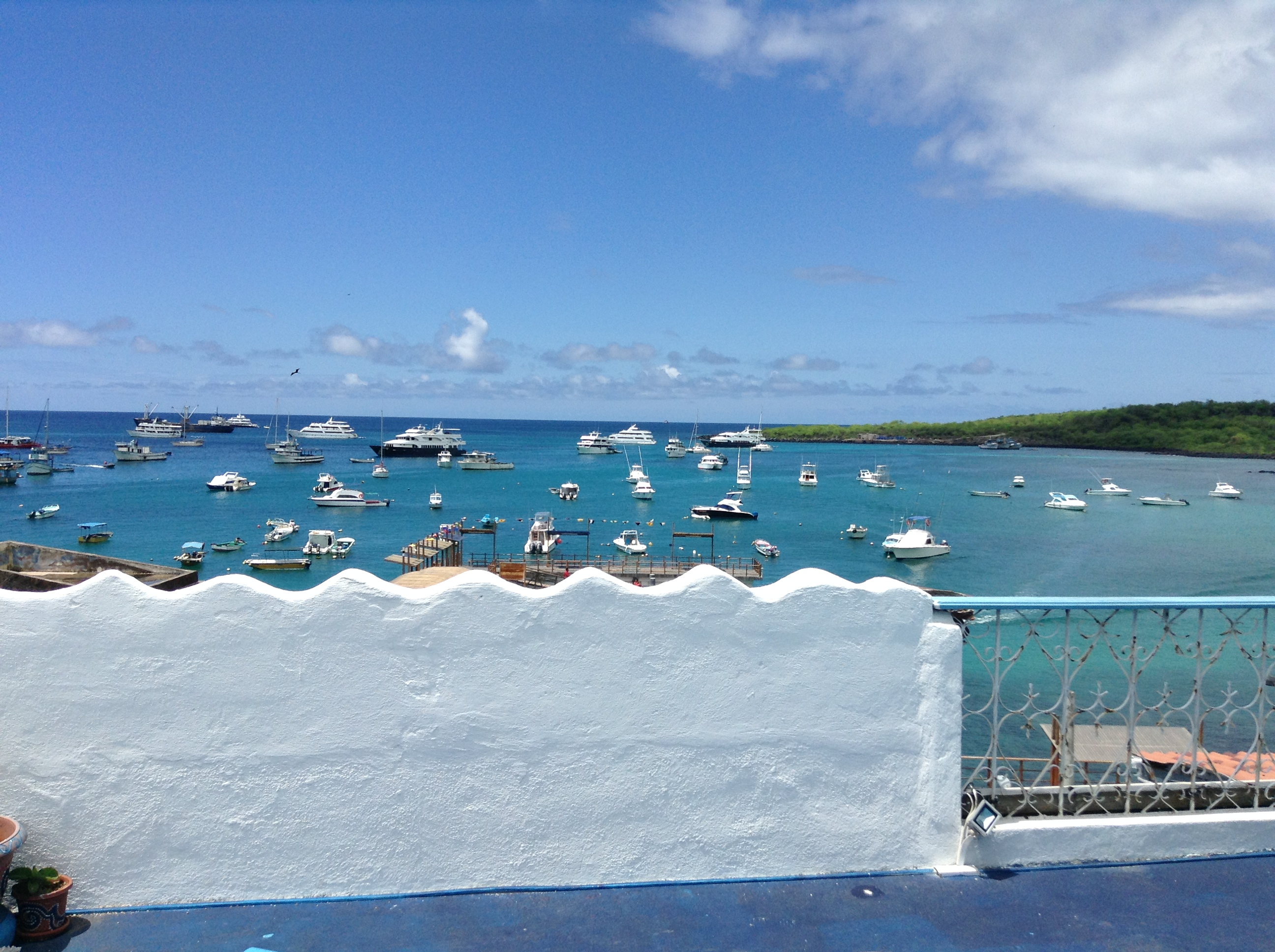
The port in Shipwreck Bay

San Cristóbal Airport is the local airport and connects to the mainland. An Airbus A319 jet operates daily from Guayaquil on the mainland. The port is situated in Bahía Naufragio (Shipwreck Bay) to the southwest of the town. Boat companies conduct tours for tourists. Buses and taxis operate in the town.

== Sister cities ==
- (United States) Chapel Hill, North Carolina (US)

== Bibliography ==
- Adès, Harry (2004). The Rough Guide to South America. Rough Guides. ISBN 978-1-85828-907-6.
- Bassett, Carol Ann (2009). Galapagos at the Crossroads: Pirates, Biologists, Tourists and Creationists Battle for Darwin's Cradle of Evolution. National Geographic. ISBN 978-1-4262-0402-9.
- Cornell, Jimmy (13 July 2010). World Cruising Destinations: An Inspirational Guide to All Sailing Destinations. A&C Black. ISBN 978-1-4081-1401-8.
- Davies, Derek; Hamilton, Dominic; Holmes, Robert (1 December 2001). Ecuador. Globe Pequot Press. ISBN 978-0-7627-1006-5.
- Denkinger, Judith; Vinueza, Luis (24 January 2014). The Galapagos Marine Reserve: A Dynamic Social-Ecological System. Springer Science & Business Media. ISBN 978-3-319-02769-2.
- Fodor (2008). Fodor's South America. Fodor's Travel Publications. ISBN 978-1-4000-0686-1.
- Grove, Jack Stein; Lavenberg, Robert J. (1997). The Fishes of the Galapagos Islands. Stanford University Press. ISBN 978-0-8047-2289-6.
- Harpp, Karen S.; Mittelstaedt, Eric; d'Ozouville, Noémi; Graham, David W. (6 October 2014). The Galapagos: A Natural Laboratory for the Earth Sciences. John Wiley & Sons. ISBN 978-1-118-85241-5.
- Hinz, Earl R. (1 January 1999). Landfalls of Paradise: Cruising Guide to the Pacific Islands. University of Hawaii Press. ISBN 978-0-8248-2115-9.
- Kricher, John C. (2006). Galápagos: A Natural History. Princeton University Press. ISBN 0-691-12633-X.
- Lopez, Barry (14 September 2011). About This Life: Journeys on the Threshold of Memory. Knopf Doubleday Publishing Group. ISBN 978-0-307-80650-5.
- Newton, Paula (2008). V!VA Travel Guides: Ecuador and the Galapagos Islands. Viva Publishing Network. ISBN 978-0-9791264-2-0.
- Palmerlee, Danny; Grosberg, Michael; McCarthy, Carolyn (2006). Ecuador & the Galápagos Islands. Lonely Planet. ISBN 978-1-74104-295-5.
- Rosenberg, Steve (1 September 2014). A Naturalist's Guide to the Galápagos Islands – 2nd Edition. Steve Rosenberg. ISBN 978-0-9904557-1-4.
- Schmidt, Duane (2001). And God Created Darwin. Xulon Press. ISBN 978-1-931232-10-4.
