= Carthage, Ohio =

Carthage, Ohio may refer to:

- Carthage, Cincinnati
- Etna, Licking County, Ohio, formerly called Carthage
- Kent, Ohio, includes an area that was originally platted as the village of Carthage in 1825
