= South-West Oxford =

- Township (lower-tier)
- Township of South-West Oxford
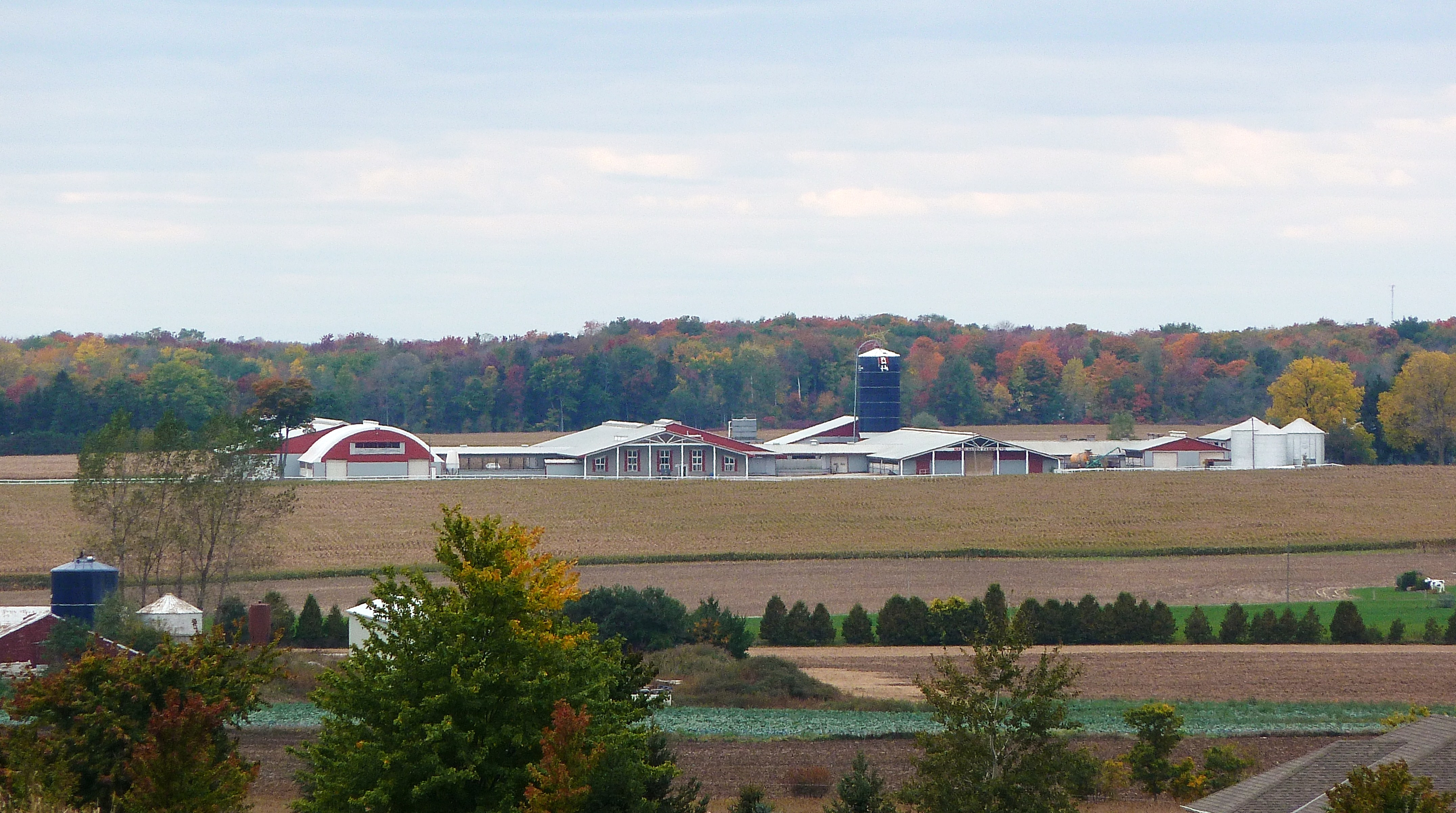
- Farm in South-West Oxford

- Location within Southern Ontario
- Coordinates: 42°58′30″N 80°49′10″W
- Country: Canada
- Province: Ontario
- County: Oxford
- Formed: 1975

Government
  - Mayor: David Mayberry
  - Federal riding: Oxford
  - Prov. riding: Oxford

Area
  - Land: 370.73 km^{2} (143.14 sq mi)

Population (2016)
  - Total: 7,664
  - Density: 20.7/km^{2} (54/sq mi)
- Time zone: UTC-5 (EST)
  - Summer (DST): UTC-4 (EDT)
- Postal Code: N0J
- Area codes: 519, 226, 548
- Website: www.swox.org

South-West Oxford is a township in the Canadian province of Ontario, located within Oxford County. The township had a population of 7,664 in the 2016 Canadian census. A predominantly rural municipality, South-West Oxford was formed in 1975 through the amalgamation of Dereham and West Oxford townships and the village of Beachville.

== Governance ==
The township council consists of the mayor and six councillors. The mayor is elected by a township-wide vote, while councillors are elected by a vote of residents in their respective ward. Members of the council are elected to four-year terms of office, with the present council's term ending in November 2022. In the election of 2018, the mayor and four of the councillors were returned by acclamation. Mayor David Mayberry began serving as a township councillor in 1994, was first elected mayor in 2006, and from 2015 to 2018 also served as the warden for the County of Oxford. The current councillors are:

- David Mayberry - Mayor
- Paul Buchner - Ward 1
- Peter Ypma - Ward 2
- Valerie Durston - Ward 3
- George Way - Ward 4
- Jim Pickard - Ward 5
- Craig Gillis - Ward 6

== Geography ==
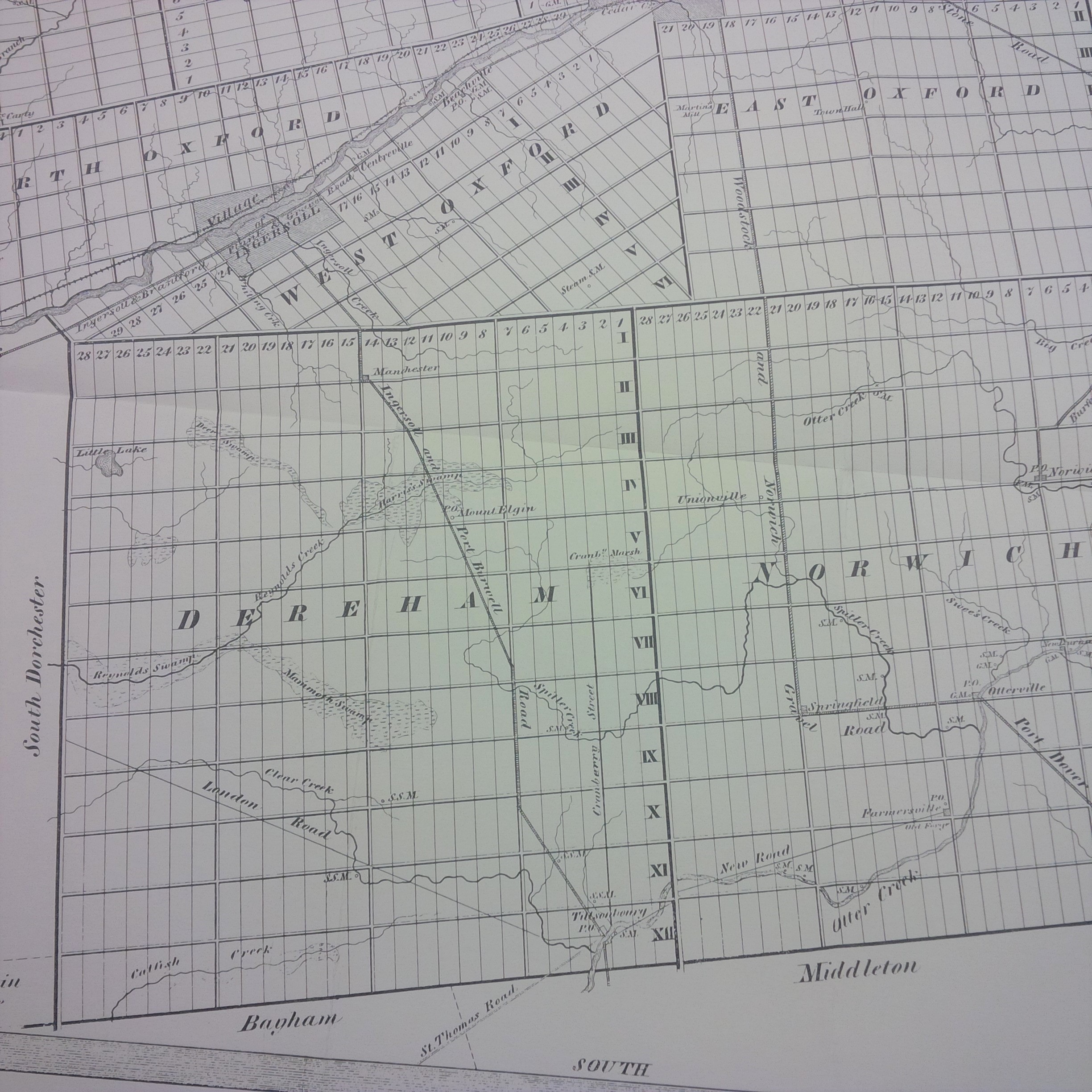
Thomas Shenston's 1852 map of West Oxford and Dereham townships, showing swamps and streams

South-West Oxford extends north to south from the middle of Oxford County (along the Thames River/Highway 401/Woodstock-Ingersoll east–west corridor) to the southern boundary of the county (along the Delhi-Tillsonburg-Aylmer/Ontario Highway 3 east–west corridor). The northern boundary follows the course of the Thames River except where carveouts have extended the boundaries of Ingersoll and Woodstock into former township lands. At Beachville, the northern boundary includes a small carveout north of the river to include all of the village's developed area within South-West Oxford. Similarly, a carveout on the township's southern boundary transferred former township lands to Tillsonburg.

In its wilderness state, the former Dereham township had thousands of acres of swamp and marsh land which limited its use for agriculture. Several large drainage projects brought great improvement and remain as essential parts of the township's farmland infrastructure. The township topography still has several large forested areas which are remnants of the original swamps on which drainage system runoff is concentrated.

At its north end, the township is underlain with an unusually pure limestone deposit centred between Ingersoll and Beachville that extends north-west through most of Zorra and south-east into Norwich. Open-pit mining of the limestone and kiln-firing to produce lime has been underway along the Thames River since pioneer days, and since the 1950s heavy industrial operations have led to nearly three thousand acres being licensed for extraction from pits more than 100 feet deep. The size of the limestone deposits is sufficient to support these operations for another century or more.

Ontario government licensing of these quarry operations was granted with the expectation the sites when exhausted would be remediated by allowing them to fill with water, creating large lakes with potential for recreational uses. As a test case begun in 2011, one of the operators is now seeking provincial licensing to use a 200-acre area which has been exhausted as a site for a megadump for municipal, industrial and institutional waste from Toronto, London and other cities. Massive public opposition has been voiced against allowing the start of such a land use bordering on the most densely populated section of Oxford County, including three of the six wards of South-West Oxford. Local politicians say they believe that on this issue, the new Ontario premier elected in 2018 “doesn’t like the idea of provincial politics shoving things down the throats of municipal leaders.”

South-West Oxford is home to the Trillium Woods Provincial Nature Reserve, a wildflower protection area popular with tourists. The park supports five colour variations of the common white trillium.

== History ==
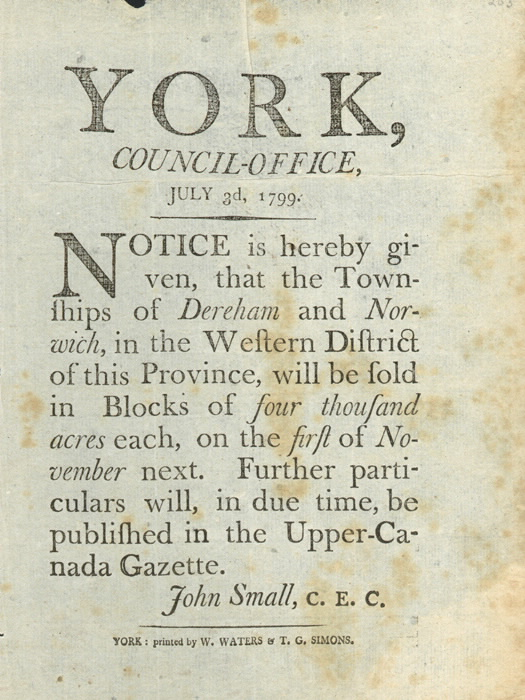
Government notice of planned sale, 1799

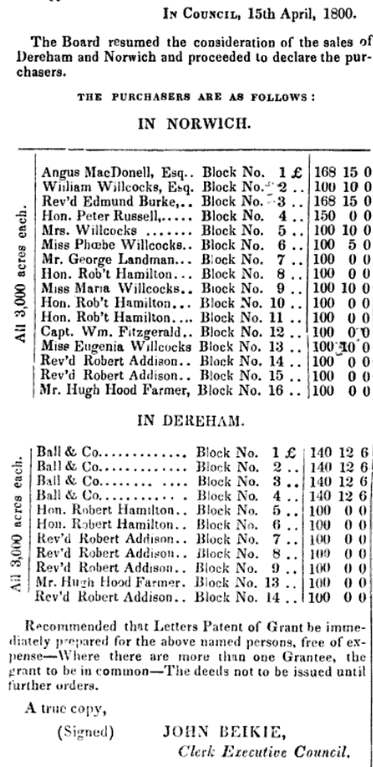
sale results, 1800

South-West Oxford includes lands in the former West Oxford township which were the earliest to be settled in Oxford County and also lands in the former Dereham township which were the last in the county to be settled. The greatest cause for slow growth in Dereham was the provincial government's decision in 1799 to auction off all the wilderness land in the township in large blocks, which thereby fell into the hands of speculators who held the land dormant for decades.

Wards 4, 5 and 6 of South-West Oxford encompass the area which was known in pioneer days as Oxford-on-the-Thames, the settlement begun in 1793 by Thomas Ingersoll (father of Canadian 1812 heroine Laura Secord) after he and his associates were granted Oxford township (containing nearly 64,000 acres) in exchange for the promise to bring in at least forty settler families. Ingersoll believed he had assurance from the provincial governor John Graves Simcoe that there were no time limits on the grant, which was essential because of the arduous process Ingersoll would face building a wagon road up into the township from Brantford, and organizing the process for families to make the move from western Massachusetts into the Oxford wilderness.

After Simcoe returned to England "for reasons of health" in 1796, the bureaucrat appointed to serve as head of government in his absence, Peter Russell, moved quickly to cancel all township grants that had been made by Simcoe, claiming not enough progress was being made. Thomas Ingersoll attempted to prove in 1797 that forty families had been settled in his township. This was acknowledge and each of them was granted 200 acres by the government, but Thomas Ingersoll was limited to 1,200 acres, and the government took back control of the rest of the township. A similar fate befell Thomas Hornor and associates, who had been granted Blenheim township, and Abraham Dayton and associates, who had been granted Burford township.

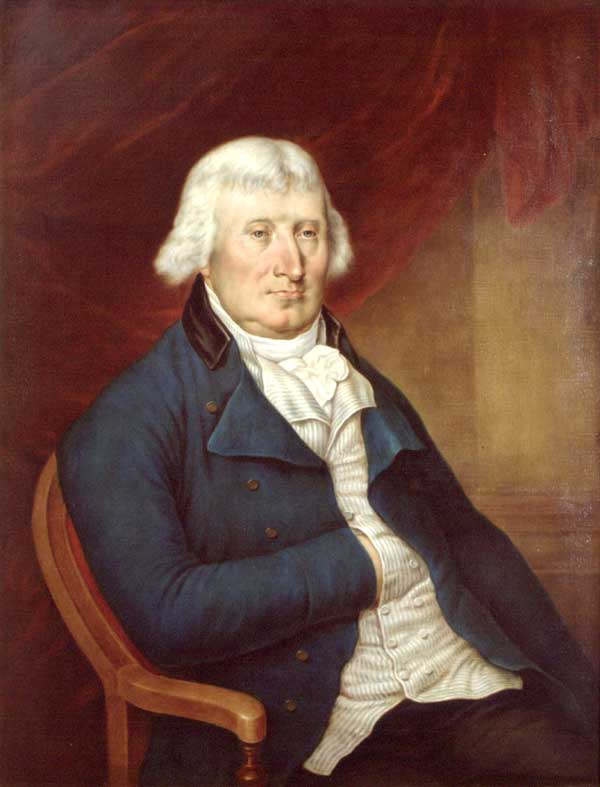
Hon. Peter Russell (1733–1808) Administrator of Upper Canada, 1796-1799

It was the same Peter Russell who two years later as head of government approved auction of all the land in adjoining Dereham and Norwich townships, to raise money to build government roads in the Toronto area. Curiously, there was by then no concern over how long it might take for these townships to be settled if sold off in this way. As a result of the sale process used, Russell and his Willcocks family cousins became owners of 18,000 acres, and most of the rest was snapped up by other government insiders. Full details were kept confidential for the next 35 years, but the amount received from the sale was so small that it was an immediate political scandal, and remained so for years, as opponents believed the land had been sold for only a third of its value.

The Willcocks holdings - 15,000 acres in Norwich township acquired by the family in the 1800 auction for £500 - were eventually sold to a group of Quakers from Dutchess County, New York in 1810 for £1,875. The swampy lands of Dereham remained dormant and eventually began to pass as legacies to the heirs of the original purchasers. Robert Gourlay, a Scotsman whose wife had inherited nearly 1,000 acres in Dereham township (around today's Mount Elgin in what is now Ward 2), made the journey to Oxford in 1817 to inspect the prize, and could not believe the township was still a complete wilderness. He began a widely publicised movement to find solutions through public gatherings and newspaper advocacy all over Upper Canada, but in return was prosecuted and jailed by the government for sedition. Gourlay's two-volume Statistical account of Upper Canada, compiled with a view to a grand system of emigration which he published in England in 1822 presented a detailed analysis based upon reports submitted to him by citizen groups in 57 townships in the province who yearned for improvements. Gourlay spent the next 35 years away from Canada, but returned to his land in Oxford in 1856 to run as a candidate in the provincial election.

It was not until 1824 that George Tillson came forward to purchase 600 acres in Dereham's south end, agreeing to pay £300, about fifteen times the 1800 sale price. Tillson was a foundryman from Massachusetts who had come to Upper Canada two years earlier to join a partnership which operated a blast furnace in the long Point area to manufacture stoves and other household goods using bog ore gathered from nearby swamps. He recognised a similar opportunity in Dereham and became the founder of Dereham Forge, now Tillsonburg. His foundry works continued for a number of years but were closed in the 1840s as Tillson devoted his resources instead to building and operating saw mills to tap into enormous demand for lumber in New York state. Sawn boards were lashed together in giant rafts and floated down Otter Creek from Dereham to Port Burwell for export.

The lumbering trade started by Tillson finally led to Dereham becoming widely settled. To speed up business, a toll road was built from Ingersoll through Tillsonburg south to Port Burwell starting in 1849. Tillson was a firm believer in having roads running direct to markets. He was a major shareholder in the toll road company, and obtained authorization to run new roads directly from Tillsonburg to London, Norwich and St. Thomas. Their routes in and around Dereham are displayed on Shenston's 1852 map on this page.

== Communities ==
The township of South-West Oxford comprises a number of villages and hamlets, including the following communities such as:

- Former Dereham Township: - Brownsville, Brownsville Station, Culloden, Delmer, Dereham Centre, Mount Elgin, Ostrander, Salford, Verschoyle, Zenda (west portion)
- Former West Oxford Township: - Beachville, Centreville, Foldens, Hagles Corners, Sweaburg

=== Beachville ===
This community was founded in 1791 and was then among the first settlements in Oxford County.

The first officially recorded game of baseball in North America was played in this community on June 4, 1838, a year before the Cooperstown Game. The Beachville Club and the Zorras were the teams playing on this occasion. By 1869, Beachville was a village with a population of 700 in the Township of West County Oxford. The village, which was on the Great Western Railway and River Thames, contained 1 flour mill, 1 flax mill, 1 foundry, 2 saw mills, 2 tanneries, 4 churches, 2 common schools, and 3 hotels. There was a Stage to Embro, Brooksdale and Stratford. The average price of land $30 to $40. The postal code for Beachville is N0J 1A0.

The county's tourism office indicates that "Beachville is also becoming a popular destination for birders and nature lovers wanting to hike the Thames River Trail". The first two kilometres of the trail, starting in Beachville, were opened in 2011; construction continues, with the goal of linking Woodstock to Ingersoll.

Beachville contained a stop on the Grand Trunk Railway, and also a stop on a streetcar line between Ingersoll and Woodstock. A school on Zorra Line closed down in 2011, and merged with other schools to create Laurie Hawkins Public School in Ingersoll. Beachville also used to contain a library, which also acted as a village hall and OPP station.

=== Centreville ===
Centreville is the first site of European settlement and a primary school for grades 1–8 in the 1960s. It is also home of Centerville Pond.

=== Dereham Centre ===
Derehem Centre is where he municipal offices of South-West Oxford are located.

=== Mount Elgin ===
Mount Elgin is located along Highway 19, south of Salford and north of Ostrander.

=== Salford ===
Salford is a small village along Highway 19 consisting of approximately 50 households. It is surrounded by agricultural land and the Oxford landfill to the east. The extent of its commercial infrastructure is a gasbar/garage which suffered a fire in 2004, and the still operational Salford Cheese Store—a post office/variety store/cheese museum. In addition, there was once multiple dairy and cheese mills, the last dairy was known as "Canada Dairy", and operated by Frederick D. Gillies, which was closed and now lies derelict. Other notable buildings included two churches, one which was recently closed due to a lack of funding, and the Salford Community Centre (a former school) with a ball diamond. Salford was the birthplace of Aimee Semple McPherson.

=== Sweaburg ===
Sweaburg is located 5 km southwest of Woodstock. Its main intersection is Sweaburg Road and Dodge Line (County Roads 12 and 41). It had a public school for students up to grade three until 2009, and currently has Sweaburg United Church and cemetery, and two ball diamonds.

== Attractions ==
- Beachville District Museum
- Lawson Nature Reserve
- Trillium Woods Provincial Nature Reserve
- Oxford Hills Golf Club

== Climate ==
Climate data for Foldens, Ontario
Month	Jan	Feb	Mar	Apr	May	Jun	Jul	Aug	Sep	Oct	Nov	Dec	Year
Record high °C (°F)	15.0 (59.0)	19.0 (66.2)	24.0 (75.2)	29.5 (85.1)	32.5 (90.5)	35.5 (95.9)	36.5 (97.7)	37.0 (98.6)	33.3 (91.9)	28.3 (82.9)	20.6 (69.1)	18.0 (64.4)	37.0 (98.6)
Mean daily maximum °C (°F)	−2.9 (26.8)	−1.8 (28.8)	3.6 (38.5)	11.2 (52.2)	18.7 (65.7)	23.6 (74.5)	25.9 (78.6)	25.0 (77.0)	20.6 (69.1)	13.7 (56.7)	6.3 (43.3)	0.0 (32.0)	12.0 (53.6)
Daily mean °C (°F)	−6.3 (20.7)	−5.4 (22.3)	−0.3 (31.5)	6.5 (43.7)	13.3 (55.9)	18.3 (64.9)	20.7 (69.3)	19.9 (67.8)	15.7 (60.3)	9.4 (48.9)	3.0 (37.4)	−3.1 (26.4)	7.6 (45.7)
Mean daily minimum °C (°F)	−9.7 (14.5)	−9 (16)	−4.3 (24.3)	1.7 (35.1)	7.9 (46.2)	12.9 (55.2)	15.4 (59.7)	14.8 (58.6)	10.8 (51.4)	4.9 (40.8)	−0.3 (31.5)	−6.2 (20.8)	3.3 (37.9)
Record low °C (°F)	−31 (−24)	−26.5 (−15.7)	−22.8 (−9.0)	−13 (9)	−4 (25)	0.0 (32.0)	4.0 (39.2)	2.0 (35.6)	−1.1 (30.0)	−8.3 (17.1)	−15.5 (4.1)	−24 (−11)	−31 (−24)
Average precipitation mm (inches)	65.6 (2.58)	51.3 (2.02)	74.3 (2.93)	79.4 (3.13)	77.5 (3.05)	86.6 (3.41)	98.8 (3.89)	93.3 (3.67)	91.7 (3.61)	77.1 (3.04)	87.6 (3.45)	75.7 (2.98)	958.9 (37.75)
Average rainfall mm (inches)	32.7 (1.29)	28.3 (1.11)	57.2 (2.25)	73.9 (2.91)	77.1 (3.04)	86.6 (3.41)	98.8 (3.89)	93.3 (3.67)	91.7 (3.61)	76.1 (3.00)	76.6 (3.02)	47.2 (1.86)	839.4 (33.05)
Average snowfall cm (inches)	32.9 (13.0)	23.1 (9.1)	17.1 (6.7)	5.6 (2.2)	0.4 (0.2)	0 (0)	0 (0)	0 (0)	0 (0)	1.0 (0.4)	11.0 (4.3)	28.5 (11.2)	119.5 (47.0)
Average precipitation days (≥ 0.2 mm)	15.8	12.3	13.3	13.6	12.6	11.1	11.6	11.4	12.6	12.5	14.9	15.2	157.0
Average rainy days (≥ 0.2 mm)	4.6	4.5	7.7	11.8	12.5	11.1	11.6	11.4	12.6	12.5	11.4	6.5	118.1
Average snowy days (≥ 0.2 cm)	12.2	9.0	6.6	2.5	0.13	0	0	0	0	0.27	4.5	10.1	45.2
Source: Environment and Climate Change Canada

== Demographics ==
South-West Oxford population history
Year	Pop.	±%
1991	8,514	—
1996	8,441	−0.9%
2001	7,782	−7.8%
2006	7,589	−2.5%
2011	7,544	−0.6%
2016	7,664	+1.6%
1996 population would have been 7,778 using 2001 boundaries

In the 2021 Census of Population conducted by Statistics Canada, South-West Oxford had a population of 7,583 living in 2,616 of its 2,708 total private dwellings, a change of −0.7% from its 2016 population of 7,634. With a land area of 369.61 km^{2} (142.71 sq mi), it had a population density of 20.5/km^{2} (53.1/sq mi) in 2021.

Canada census – South-West Oxford community profile

	2016	2011
Population	7664 (1.6% from 2011)	7544 (-0.6% from 2006)
Land area	370.73 km^{2} (143.14 sq mi)	370.48 km^{2} (143.04 sq mi)
Population density	20.7/km^{2} (54/sq mi)	20.4/km^{2} (53/sq mi)
Median age	39.7 (M: 39.4, F: 39.9)	39.4 (M: 39.2, F: 39.6)
Private dwellings	2690 (total)	2695 (total)
Median household income	$82,509

References: 2016 2011

== See also ==
- List of townships in Ontario
