= Apostolic Vicariate of Galápagos =

Catholic missionary jurisdiction in Ecuador

Apostolic Vicariate of Galapagos Apostolicus Vicariatus Galapagensis

Location
- Country: Ecuador

Statistics
- Area: 8,010 km^{2} (3,090 sq mi)
- Population: Total; Catholics: (as of 2010); 22,500; 17,000 (75.6%)
- Parishes: 9

Information
- Denomination: Catholic Church
- Rite: Roman Rite
- Established: 6 May 1950 (75 years ago)
- Cathedral: Catedral La Inmaculada

Current leadership
- Pope: Leo XIV
- Apostolic Vicar: Áureo Patricio Bonilla Bonilla, O.F.M.
- Bishops emeritus: Manuel Antonio Valarezo Luzuriaga, O.F.M.

Map
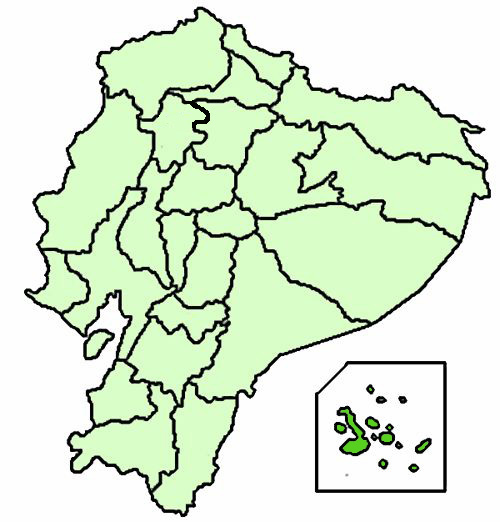

The Apostolic Vicariate (or Vicariate Apostolic) of Galápagos (Latin: Apostolicus Vicariatus Galapagensis) is a missionary pre-diocesan jurisdiction of the Roman Catholic Church, located on the Galápagos Islands off the Pacific coast of Ecuador, coinciding with the homonymous insular province.

Its cathedral see is the Marian 'Catedral La Inmaculada', dedicated to the Immaculate Conception, in Puerto Baquerizo Moreno, on San Cristóbal Island. It is exempt, i.e. directly subject to the Holy See, not part of any ecclesiastical province.

It comprises ten parishes, which serve both locals and tourists to the World Heritage Site natural reserve.

== History ==
On 6 May 1950, Pope Pius XII established the Apostolic Prefecture of Galápagos on territory split off from the Diocese of Guayaquil.

Pope Benedict XVI elevated it to an Apostolic Vicariate of Galápagos on 15 July 2008.

== Incumbent Ordinaries ==
(all Roman Rite) So far, all incumbents have been Franciscans (O.F.M.)

Apostolic Prefects of Galápagos

- Pedro Pablo Andrade Sanchez, O.F.M. † (1951–1959). Nacido en Quito - Ecuador (30 de junio de 1892 - 22 de noviembre de 1973 ) con el nombre de Luis Reinaldo Andrade Sánchez, fue hijo de Dr. Federico Estanislao Andrade Jaramillo y de la señora Victoria Sánchez Corral. Toma los hábitos el 5 de mayo de 1912. Fuente: Provincia de San Francisco de Quito. Sus hermanos fueron: Ricardo, Guillermo Enrique, Cornelio Estanislao, Gabriel Ignacio, Srta. Lucía Andrade Sánchez.
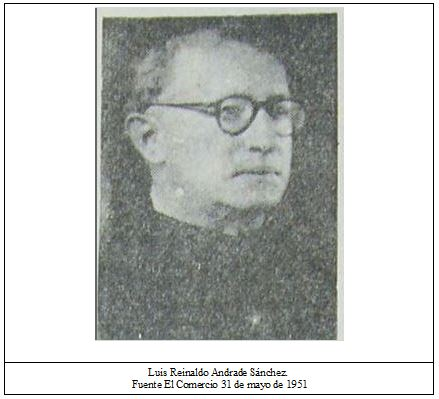
- Juan de Dios Campuzano, O.F.M. † (20 Nov. 1959 – 30 Oct. 1967)
- Hugolino Cerasuolo Stacey, O.F.M. (3 Oct. 1967 – 30 May 1975)
- Serafín Luis Alberto Cartagena Ocaña, O.F.M. (17 May 1980 – 10 Sep. 1982)
- Manuel Antonio Valarezo Luzuriaga, O.F.M. (22 June 1990 – 15 July 2008, cfr. infra)

Apostolic Vicars of Galápagos

- Manuel Antonio Valarezo Luzuriaga, O.F.M. (cfr. supra 15 July 2008 – 29 October 2013), Titular Bishop of Quæstoriana (1996.04.22 – ...)
- Áureo Patricio Bonilla Bonilla, O.F.M., former Vicar Provincial of the Order of Friars Minor in Ecuador, titular bishop of Bida (29 October 2013 – ...).

== See also ==
- Roman Catholicism in Ecuador
- Immaculate Conception Cathedral, Puerto Baquerizo Moreno

== Sources and external links ==
- http://www.gcatholic.org/dioceses/diocese/esme0.htm
