= Calandrinia galapagosa =

Conservation status
- Conservation Dependent (IUCN 2.3)

Scientific classification
- Kingdom: Plantae
- Clade: Tracheophytes
- Clade: Angiosperms
- Clade: Eudicots
- Order: Caryophyllales
- Family: Montiaceae
- Genus: Calandrinia
- Species: C. galapagosa

Binomial name
- Calandrinia galapagosa H. St. John

Species of flowering plant

Calandrinia galapagosa is a species of plant in the Montiaceae family. It is endemic to the Galápagos Islands of Ecuador.
