= List of numbered roads in Perth County =

List of county roads

This is a list of numbered county roads in Perth County, Ontario.

For civic-addressing purposes (such as 911), nearly all rural roads in Perth County are numbered. Roads that run east and west, or southeast and northwest, are numbered "Line 1", "Line 2", and so on to "Line 93". Roads that run north and south, or northeast and southwest, are numbered "Road 101", "Road 102", and so on to "Road 183". The roads maintained by the County are numbered in accordance with this scheme; for example, "Perth Line 9" is the section of Line 9 that the county maintains, and "Perth Road 151" is the section of Road 151 that the county maintains.

== List ==
Name	Distance	Terminus	Terminus	Cities it passes by	Paved
Perth County Line 8	11.41 km	NW Junction Highway 23 in Kirkton	SE Junction Perth Road 163 north of Rannoch	Kirkton	Yes
Perth County Line 9	3.68 km	NW Eastern boundary of St. Marys	SE Junction Highway 7 (Road 119)	St. Marys	Yes
Perth County Line 20	27.1 km	W Junction Huron CR 83	SE Junction Highway 7 (Road 119)	Russeldale, Fullarton, St. Pauls Station	Yes
Perth County Line 24	14.3 km	NW Junction Thames Road	SE Junction Highway 23 (Road 164)	Staffa	Yes
Perth County Line 26	13.5 km	W Junction Highway 7 (Road 119)	E Tavistock	Harmony, Tavistock	Yes
Perth County Line 32	4.1 km	NW Junction Perth Road 130	SE Stratford boundary		Yes
Perth County Line 33	9.4 km	W Junction Romeo Street, Stratford	E Junction Perth Road 107	Stratford	Yes
Perth County Line 36	1.7 km	NW Junction Perth Road 122	SE Junction Perth Road 119 north of Stratford	Stratford	Yes
Perth County Line 37	5.3 km	W Junction Romeo Street, Stratford	E Brocksden; junction Road 109		Yes
Perth County Line 43	15.9 km	W Junction Perth Road 119	E Perth-Waterloo boundary	Amulree	Yes
Perth County Line 44	28.6 km	NW Junction Perth Road 180	SE Junction Perth Road 119	Brodhagen, Bronholm	Yes
Perth County Line 55	20.5 km	NW Junction Perth Road 180	SE Junction Perth Road 119	Monkton	Yes
Perth County Line 56; (Waterloo RR 7)	8 km	NW Junction Perth Road 119	SE Junction Road 105	Topping, Nithburg	Yes
Perth County Line 72	26.1 km	NW Junction Road 173 (Huron-Perth boundary)	SE Junction Road 116	Newry, Donegal, Millbank	Yes
Perth County Line 86; (Wellington CR 86)	29.8 km	NW Junction Perth Road 178	SE Junction Road 116 at Dorking	Molesworth, Listowel, Dorking	Yes
Perth County Line 88	9 km	NW Perth Road 178	SE Highway 23	Mayne Corners, Kurtzville, Shipley, Gowanstown	Yes
Perth County Line 91	4.5 km	NW Toronto Street	SE Junction Perth Road 140	Palmerston	Yes
Perth County Line 93; (Wellington CR 123)	5.7 km	NW Toronto Street	SE Junction Perth Road 140 (Wellington CR 9)	Palmerston, Teviotdale	Yes
Perth County Road 101; (Oxford CR 24, Waterloo RR 1)	1.8 km	SW Tavistock	NE Junction Highway 7 & 8 (Line 34)	Tavistock	Yes
Perth County Road 107	18.3 km	S Tavistock	N Junction Perth Line 56 (Waterloo RR 7)	Tavistock, Shakespeare, Amulree	Yes
Perth County Road 112	4.1 km	S Junction Perth Line 26	N Stratford city limits		Yes
Perth County Road 113	7.6 km	S Junction Perth/Oxford Road	N Junction Highway 7 (Road 119)		Yes
Perth County Road 118	2.1 km	S Junction Highway 7 (Elginfield Road) and Oxford CR 119	N Junction Perth Line 9		Yes
Perth County Road 119	20.6 km	S Stratford city limits	N Junction Perth Line 55 and Perth Road 131	Gadshill	Yes
Perth County Road 120A (James Street South)	1.2 km	S Junction Highway 7 (Elginfield Road)	N St. Marys town limits		Yes
Perth County Road 121	19.1 km	SW Junction Perth Line 55	NE Junction Perth Line 86 (Wellington CR 86)	Millbank, Hesson	Yes
Perth County Road 122; (Oloane Street)	2.2 km	SW Junction Highway 8 (Line 34), Stratford	NE Junction Perth Line 36	Stratford	Yes
Perth County Road 123	1.6 km	S Junction Highway 7 (Elginfield Road)	N St. Marys town limits		Yes
Perth County Road 130	16.2 km	S St. Marys town limits	NE Junction Highway 8 (Line 34)	Avonton	Yes
Perth County Road 131	17.2 km	SW Junction Perth Line 55 and Perth Road 119	NE Junction Perth Line 86 (Wellington CR 86)	Milverton	Yes
Perth County Road 135	16.5 km	SW Sebringville	NE Junction Perth Line 55	Rostock, Wartburg	Yes
Perth County Road 139	9 km	SW Prospect Hill	E St. Marys		Yes
Perth County Road 140; (Wellington CR 9)	18.6 km	SW Junction Perth Line 86 (Wellington CR 86)	NE Junction Perth Line 93 (Wellington CR 123)	Teviotdale	Yes
Perth County Road 147	10.2 km	SW Junction Perth Line 72	NE Junction Perth Line 86	Donegal, Britton	Yes
Perth County Road 151	7.8 km	SW Junction Whalen Line	NE Junction Perth Line 8		Yes
Perth County Road 163	20.6 km	S Rannoch	N Junction Highway 23 (Road 164)		Yes
Perth County Road 178; (Huron CR 34, Wellington CR 4)	19.4 km	W Junction Perth Line 86	E Junction Highway 23 (Road 164)		Yes
Perth County Road 180; (Huron CR 14)	30.3 km	SW Junction Line 17	NE Junction Perth Line 55 (Huron CR 25)		Yes
