= Communities in Norfolk County, Ontario =

Norfolk County in the Canadian province of Ontario consists of a long list of communities. Its four designated population centres are Simcoe, Port Dover, Delhi, and Waterford.

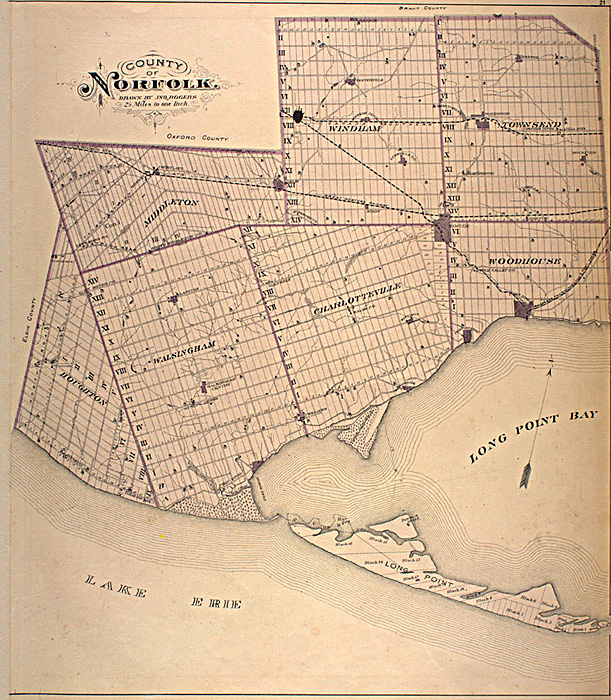
Map of Norfolk County from 1877, showing historical townships.

The population of the County at the time of the 2016 Census was 64,044. Of that number, 13,922 live in the community of Simcoe.

In the late 1900s, the county was merged with Haldimand County but the merged entity was dissolved in 2000 and this area became The Town of the County of Norfolk.

== Communities ==
=== A ===
==== Andy's Corners ====
Andy's Corners (42.763146°N 80.594158°W) is a small community that is between Wyecombe and Carholme in Norfolk County.

==== Atherton ====
Atherton (42.82298°N 80.446959°W) is a hamlet in Norfolk County that is in between Gilbertville and Simcoe. The population of Atherton is less than 100 people and there are no sidewalks in the hamlet. The tiny community can be found by exploring on Highway 3 as well as Lynedoch Road which is the other major road that goes into Atherton.

=== B ===
==== Bill's Corners ====
Bill's Corners (42.813222°N 80.374775°W) is a hamlet in Norfolk County that is between Green's Corners and Hillcrest. Further to the east is the town of Simcoe, which is the closest town to Bill's Corners.

One famous previous resident was Dwayne Roloson, who played for six different teams before retiring from the National Hockey League. Roloson currently serves as a goaltending consultant within the Anaheim Ducks organization for the Norfolk Admirals (Norfolk, Virginia).

==== Blayney ====
Blayney is a hamlet in Norfolk County that is in between Pine Grove and Green's Corners. Established prior to 1920, it is considered to be one of Norfolk County's lost hamlets. It once hosted its own post office and general store before they were burnt down sometime after 1920.

Rick Danko, a musician and founding member of The Band, has a historical plaque dedicated to him near his childhood home. He performed on a 4-string tenor banjo shortly after entering grade 1. As a child, Danko was hyperactive, but was diagnosed in an era before Ritalin became mainstream.

==== Bloomsburg ====
Bloomsburg (42.885272°N 80.301218°W) is a hamlet in Norfolk County which can be found on the old Ontario provincial Highway 24 that turns off from the "new" Ontario Provincial Highway 24 about 3 km north of Simcoe. Bloomsburg is the home of Bloomsburg Public School which is for primary, junior, and senior students (kindergarten through eighth grade). There is no commerce in this hamlet and the only industry is agriculture.

==== Booth's Harbour ====
Booth's Harbour is a community in Norfolk County. There is a historic harbor present which is named after a man named Booth who was one of the earliest settlers in the area. The village was founded in the 19th century. Booth's Harbour is located near Lake Erie, just across the bay from Long Point. Fishing and boating are productive summer pastimes here along with swimming and exploring the harbour.

==== Boston ====
Boston is an unincorporated area (42.990711°N 80.270147°W) in Norfolk County. Agriculture is the main industry and commerce is limited. It is located northeast of the town of Simcoe. There is also a kindergarten-to-grade 8 school, Boston Public School, in the town.

=== C ===
==== Clear Creek ====
Clear Creek (42.582095°N 80.591326°W) is a hamlet in southwestern Norfolk County. Although people live there and own real estate, the hamlet is legally described as agriculture land, not residential land to reduce property taxes.

Approximately 70 people live in this town amongst the 140 houses. About 9 of the houses have been abandoned due to safety issues from the wind turbines. People have lived in this community as far back as 1901 with some Canadian soldiers from the First World War having been raised in this community.

There are no sidewalks for safer pedestrian walking and wind turbines are seen very frequently within the vicinity of Clear Creek; being installed in November 2008.

Norfolk County has banned the placement of new wind turbines after becoming a "willing host" for them back in 2003. One of the council members were worried about Norfolk County becoming "industrialized" and "unnatural." Many leaders in Norfolk County envision the county as being an agricultural hub for Southern Ontario even by the middle of the 22nd century. The nearest high school is Valley Heights Secondary School which is to the northeast. Students from here grab the same high school bus as the students from Houghton.

==== Courtland ====
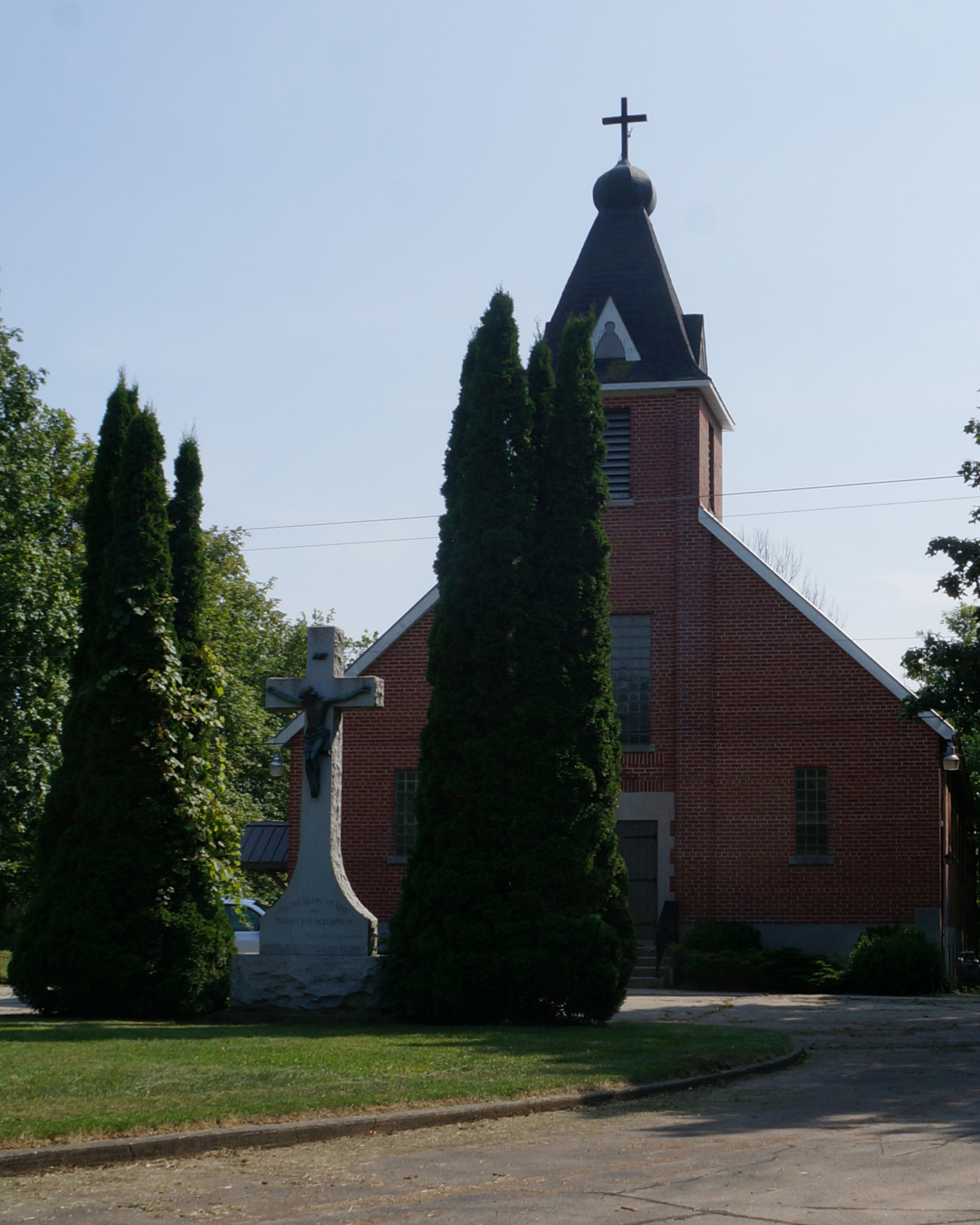
Former St George Greek Catholic Church in Courtland

Courtland (42.840605°N 80.632782°W) is a village located in Norfolk County on Highway 3 between Delhi and Tillsonburg. This community was once known as Middleton; named after the more well-known community of Middleton in Nova Scotia. The first settler was Lot Tisdale who arrived in 1823. 917 people live here as of 2009. A 30-hectare certified organic herb farm owned by Garry Proven operates in the area.

Sidewalks only exist on the main streets. Otherwise, the walk through Courtland is simple provided that pedestrians pay extra caution to the traffic on the street. Flat terrain exists throughout the entire village; and the village spans approximately 5 kilometres. Recommended activities are hiking, running, and walking. The usage of ATVs, motorcycles, and bicycles are not recommended due to safety concerns. Unlike most communities in Norfolk County, Courtland is entirely accessible for wheelchair users.

The full extent of the service industry in Courtland includes a variety store, an antique store, a "bread and pastries" type of bakery which has been operating in the community since 1939, a family restaurant and a flower shop. Courtland Vinyl Windows and Gopher Dunes are a couple of well-known businesses in the area. A golf course was once located here; it closed on October 16, 2003, due to factors caused by the early 2000s recession. Official tax policy changes made after the 2003 Ontario provincial election worsened the local poverty rate and made people less likely to enjoy golf as a recreational sport.

=== D ===
==== Delhi ====
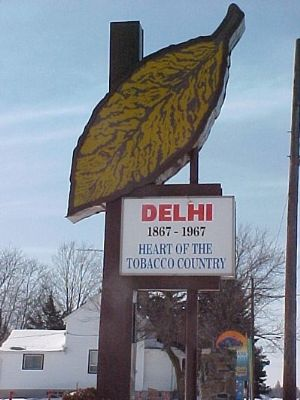
Sign in Delhi

Delhi (pronounced DEL-High) is located off of the junction of Hwy 59 and 3 and is known as the Heart of Tobacco Country.

The settlement was founded by Frederick Sovereign (or Sovereign) who built a cabin here in about 1812. At the time, the area was heavily treed and would become important in the lumber industry. The village was named Sovereign's Corners (or Sovereign's Corners) and later Fredericksburg until the post office opened as Delhi in 1856. Sovereign was a tavern keeper for over 30 years. He also manufactured plug tobacco, growing his own leaves, curing them, and pressing them. He donated the land for the Baptist church and served as deacon for "many, many years".

The population in 1869 was 300 and the village had some manufacturing as well as a lumber mill thanks to the abundant water power. The post office was receiving mail daily. The railway arrived in the 1870s a definite benefit to locals who opened business such as the Delhi Canning Company, established in 1878; the company shipped canned local produce across Canada.

Until 2001, Delhi was located within the Township of Delhi, a municipal government within the Regional Municipality of Haldimand-Norfolk. Prior to the amalgamation of Norfolk County, the population of the former Township of Delhi was 16,365 in the Canada 2001 Census Part of the agricultural heritage of Delhi included tobacco cultivation. The town has a tobacco museum to commemorate this part of its history. Local farms rely in part upon Jamaican and Mexican workers, who usually arrive around mid-to-late April and return to their homelands around early-to-mid November.

North Creek was once the most important spawning point for the local fish species until it was dammed in 1965.

As of 2016, the majority of Delhi's residents speak English as a first language and were born in Canada. Females outnumber males, and working-age people outnumber children and elderly people. Delhi will experience a surge in old age pensioners by the year 2026. Seventy people were born in the United States of America, while 250 were born in Europe. Ten residents were born in Africa, while 20 residents were born in Asia. Delhi's population is expected to grow to approximately 5,215 residents by 2056, although future wars and pandemics may affect this population growth. People are less likely to have children or emigrate to Canada if there are any major political/medical events happening in the world.

==== Dog's Nest ====
Dog's Nest is a community northeast of Port Dover along Highway 6, containing three businesses and two homes. It has had its sign stolen 3 times and the municipality at the time decided not to put the sign back up. There is now a committee not for profit "DogsNest 1851" formed April 2019 to bring back the sign. They sold t-shirts, hats and merch to raise funds. 100% volunteer driven and 100% of proceeds went towards the sign and surrounding area needs. On July 16th, 2023, a seven tonne granite sign was installed with the proceeds of this effort.

=== F ===
==== Fishers Glen ====
Fishers Glen is a fishing community that is south of Simcoe and southwest of Port Ryerse. It is considered to be a part of Norfolk County. Fishers Glen is famous among locals for being one of the best fishing spots in Lake Erie during the summer months.

==== Frogmore ====
Frogmore (42.685464°N 80.658703°W) is a hamlet that is situated on the junction of Norfolk County Roads 45 and 28. It is located northwest of Valley Heights Secondary School. Agriculture is the predominant industry while commercial business ventures are non-existent. It is one of the westernmost communities in Norfolk County.

This community has a sizeable population of German Mennonites and Mexican Mennonites. Only six wind turbines, carrying approximately 9 MW of electricity have been placed in the vicinity. No more can be built in this area due to a county-wide ban on wind turbines passed in 2013. Even without the threat of wind turbines, this community is completely shielded from urban development threats due to its isolation from major communities like Simcoe, Delhi, and Tillsonburg.

=== G ===
==== Gilbertville ====
Gilbertville (42.823925°N 80.481806°W) is a hamlet in Norfolk County that is located between Pine Grove and Delhi. The local economy is founded on agriculture, which produces potatoes, onions, and asparagus, among other vegetables. Commerce in Gilbertville includes a tractor shop and an auto repair shop. There is a conservation park to the west of the hamlet. For administrative purposes and municipal elections, Gilbertville is considered to be the southernmost community in the third ward of Norfolk County.

==== Glenshee ====
Glenshee (42.767809°N 80.483522°W) is a hamlet that is located west of Pinegrove in Norfolk County. The hamlet is mostly agricultural and residential. In addition to farms, there is also a machine shop that serves the local residents. The population is under 20 people and the nearest commerce is in Tillsonburg and Delhi.

==== Green's Corners ====
Green's Corners is a hamlet in Norfolk County that is located west of Simcoe, north of Walsh, southeast of Delhi, and east of Pine Grove. The population of Green's Corners is less than 50 people. In addition to residential property, there is also agriculture and some commerce. There is a bakery, a bed and breakfast, an automobile garage, and a Christmas tree store. This hamlet was also the hometown of the late musician, Rick Danko of The Band, who enjoyed a remarkable career on and off the stage.

=== H ===
==== Halfway House Corner ====
Halfway House Corner is a hamlet in Norfolk County. It is considered to be south of Simcoe and northwest of Port Dover. The Halfway House was an inn that sat on the southwest corner of the intersection. The name was given because it was located exactly half the distance between Port Dover and Simcoe. Ontario Highway 24 is the main road and commerce in this community includes a bait shop and a recording studio.

==== Hillcrest ====
Hillcrest (42.830471°N 80.336494°W) is a hamlet in Norfolk County that is in between Bill's Corners and the town of Simcoe. There is also a soccer field; which received a $15,000 stimulus package from the Simcoe Lions Club on April 7, 2013. Adult amateur leagues typically do not use this field; with the exception of the Western Ontario Soccer League.

==== Houghton ====
Houghton is a former township in Norfolk County. Its township seat was Fairground, a small village today. It is located in the southwest of Norfolk, bordering on the former Norfolk townships of Middleton to the northeast, and North and South Walsingham to the east. Fairground is a small community in Norfolk County, Ontario, Canada where the Norfolk County Fair and Horse Show took place in the early 19th century.

Until that event was moved to Simcoe, this was the spot where fairgoers attended the attractions and farmers displayed their best produce. The community of Fairground borders on the municipality of Bayham in Elgin County to the west, and its southern border is the Lake Erie shoreline, with no natural harbours.

=== J ===
==== Jacksonburg ====
Jacksonburg (42.590°N 80.631°W)

=== L ===
==== Langton ====
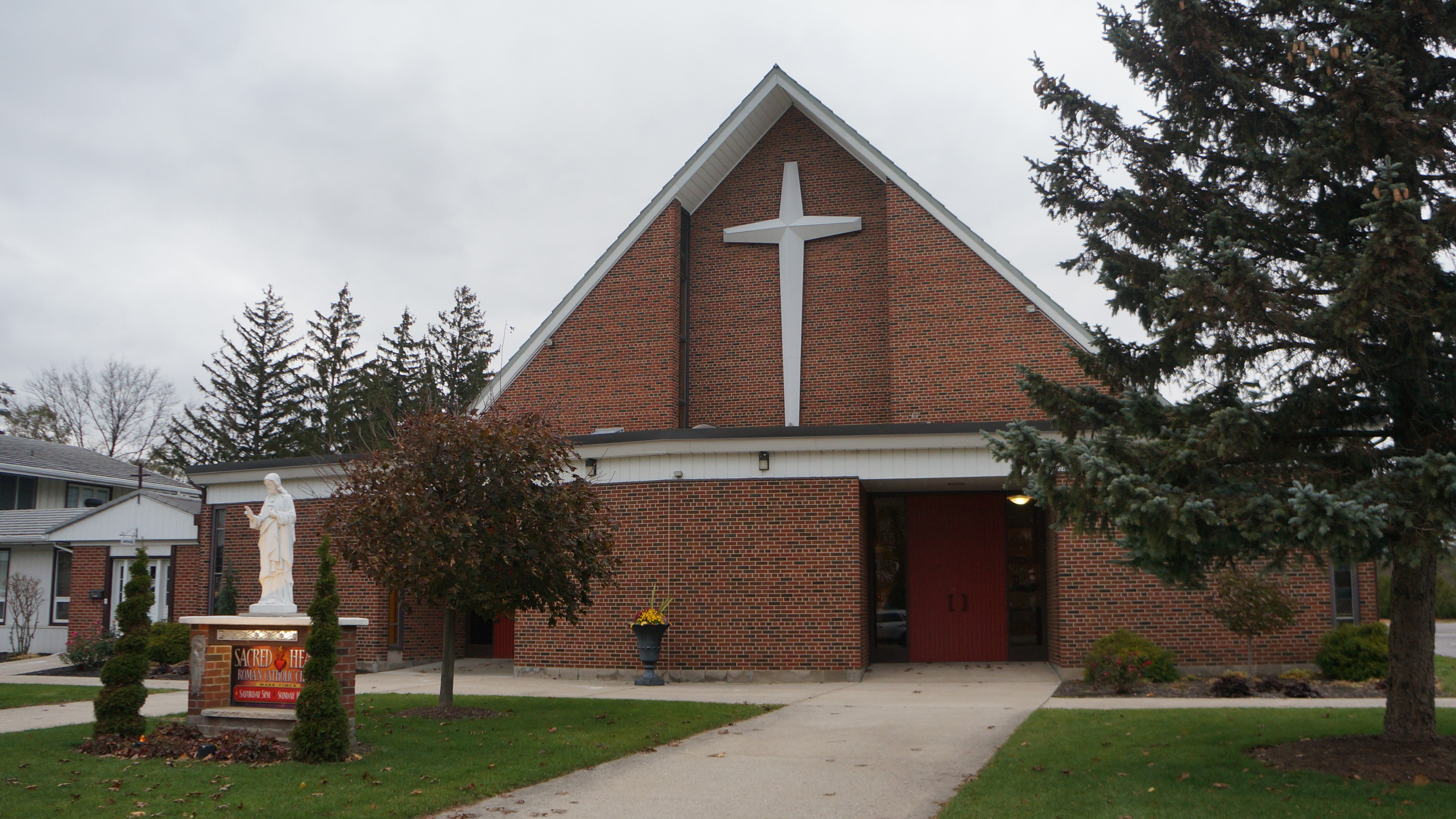
Sacred Heart Church in Langton

Langton (42.74197°N 80.577679°W) is a small town located in Norfolk County; formerly known as Boughner's Corner.

The town can be accessed by travelling to the intersection just slightly to the west of Courtland and turning south on Ontario provincial Highway 59 if coming from Delhi, south if coming from Tillsonburg or if travelling eastbound on Ontario Provincial Highway 3, and straight ahead if travelling southbound using Ontario provincial Highway 59.

Langton once had two banks but the CIBC bank closed in May 2016 due to increased online banking activity and the changing Canadian economy; placing the future of offline banking in this community in definite jeopardy. Despite its small population, Langton was considered to be a banking hub for the tobacco farmers during the 20th century.

Sidewalks exist only on the main street, otherwise, walking in this town is very simple. The entire town spans 5 kilometers in length. Langton enjoys scenery that is very rural and flat. Streets can be busy sometimes; especially during the weekdays. Possible activities include hiking, walking, running, and cycling.

==== La Salette ====
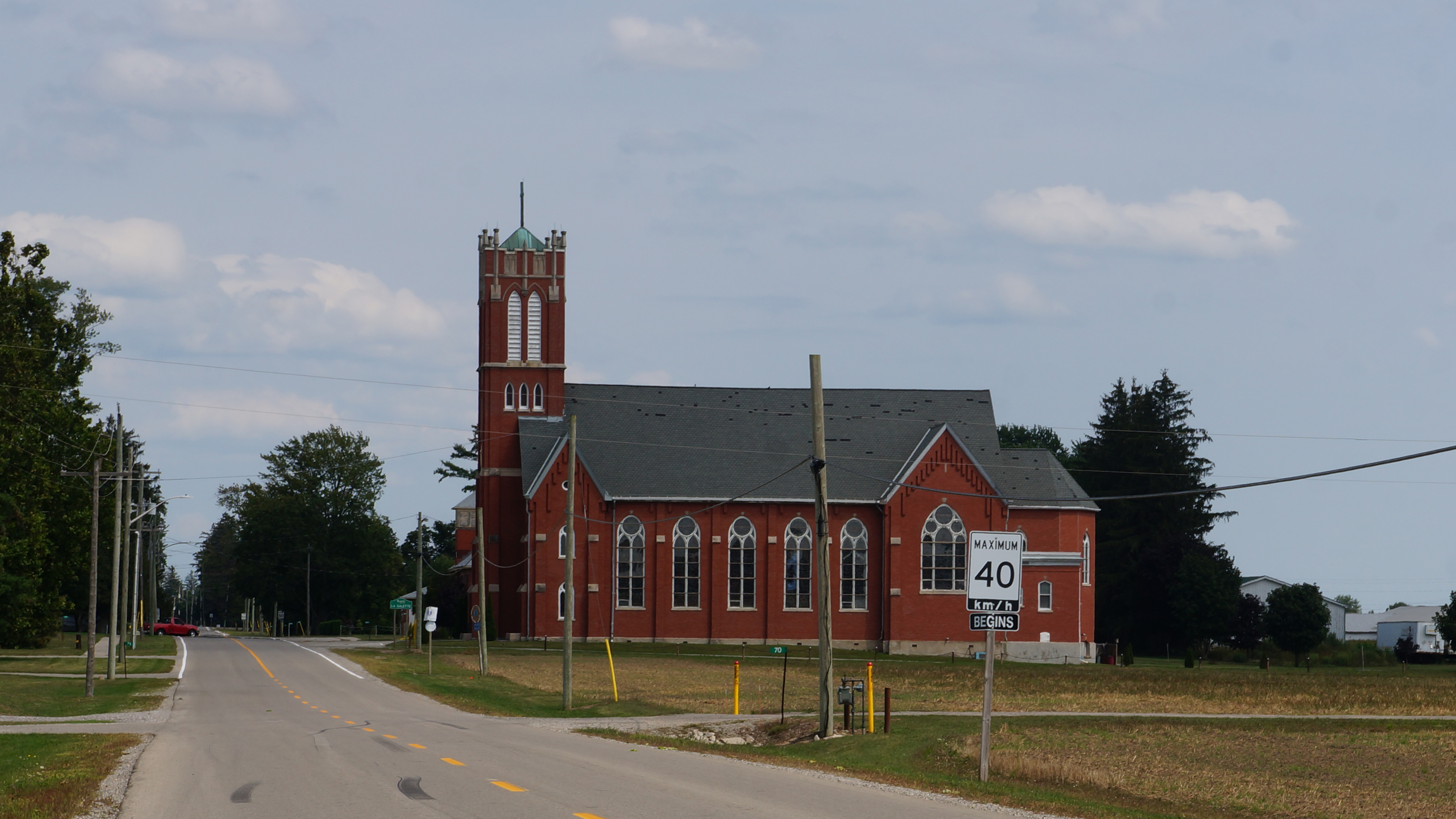
La Salette Historic Church

La Salette is a hamlet that is north of Delhi in Norfolk County, Ontario, Canada. La Salette is southwest of Brantford in nearby Brant County and northwest of Simcoe. Agriculture is the main industry and commerce is extremely limited. Most of the houses in La Salette are over 100 years old and the population of La Salette is less than 100 people.

==== Long Point ====
Old Cut Lighthouse at Long Point

Long Point is a sand spit and medium-sized hamlet on the north shore of Lake Erie, part of Norfolk County.

It is about 40 kilometres or 25 miles long and is about a kilometre across at its widest point. Lake Erie lies to the south of Long Point, and the waters to the north side comprise Long Point Bay. The bay is subdivided into the Inner Bay and Outer Bay by a line that runs between Turkey Point to the north and Pottahawk Point to the south. Some of the towns along the bay's north shore include Port Rowan, Turkey Point and Port Dover. Long Point is north and across the lake from Erie, Pennsylvania.

Sport hunting was important after the Long Point Company purchased the Point in 1866 to facilitate this pursuit. Long Point Provincial Park was created in May 1921; by 1929, it was connected to the mainland by a new causeway.

==== Lynedoch ====
Lynedoch (42.801573°N 80.509701°W) is a hamlet in Norfolk County which was named after Baron Lynedoch who served under Wellington during the Napoleonic Wars.

During the 19th century, this hamlet had a post office, a school, a tailor, blacksmith, taverns, hotels, and churches. A church has been restored in the area and is being used for outdoor weddings and private receptions.

Dennis' Horseradish is produced a short distance east of the settlement.

=== N ===
==== Nixon ====
Nixon is a hamlet in Norfolk County, Ontario, Canada that is almost exclusively residential. There is an airfield, some farms, and a single office building that is dedicated to an agriculture-related business in the hamlet where Nixon Public School used to be. Nixon is east of the town of Delhi, northwest of the town of Simcoe, and northeast of the hamlet of Pinegrove.

Plans are currently underway for a microbrewery to open in the community; beers and wines that emulate those found in Belgium and the Netherlands will be manufactured here. Producing very little noise or steam pollution, the microbrewery will bolster the economy of Norfolk County. Trappist beers will be brewed on site for the purpose of getting the higher-class members of Norfolk County to spend money more locally. The municipal government approved the rezoning of the surrounding land to "light industrial" for Norfolk County's third microbrewery to be possible according to the local by-laws. This community is the westernmost community to receive water from the Lynn River; which flows directly into Lake Erie.

==== Normandale ====
Normandale (42.710822°N 80.311346°W) is a quaint fishing town in southwestern Norfolk County that is famous for its perch and black bass. This settlement was part of Charlotteville where Fort Norfolk was built in 1813 with accommodation for 300 troops. A large iron foundry, the Normandale Furnace and Ironworks was built here in 1817 and was expanded in 1822; it made farm implements, the well-known Van Norman stoves as well as kettles, pots, and pans but closed down in 1847 or 1850.

=== P ===
==== Pinegrove ====
Prior to the late 1970s, much of Pine Grove was agricultural land owned by the Adcock family. After the family patriarch died circa 1978, the land was distributed amongst his sons and the first housing boom in Pine Grove occurred. Three-quarters of present-day Pine Grove were completed by the mid-1980s. In the 1980s, children needing special education attended Nixon Public School and North Public School. Both of these schools are defunct and are no longer operating as of 2007.

==== Port Dover ====
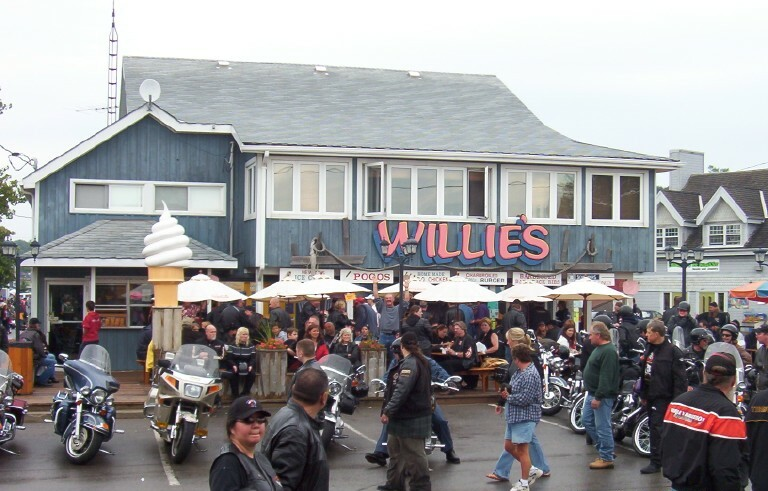
Willie's Restaurant in Port Dover on Friday, August 13, 2004.

In 1670, French missionaries François Dollier de Casson and René Bréhant de Galinée became the first Europeans to winter at what is now Port Dover. Earthen remains and a plaque marks the spot near the fork of the Lynn River (Patterson's Creek to many of the older Port Doverites) and Black Creek where they and seven Frenchmen (the first Europeans known to have ascended the Great Lakes to Sault Ste. Marie) built a hut and chapel. Just outside the community, a cross with the arms of France had been erected on 23 March 1670, claiming the area for King Louis XIV over the Lake Erie region.

By 1794 the first settlers, a group of United Empire Loyalists, had established a hamlet known as Dover Mills (named for the English port of Dover) which was razed to the ground by the Americans in the War of 1812. During the war, in August 1812, Major General Isaac Brock gathered a force of about regulars and militia here. Using boats on the lake, they reached Amherstburg (also in Upper Canada) and then attacked and captured the American Hull's Army at Detroit.

Subsequent reconstruction took place closer to the mouth of the Lynn River, where a harbour had been in use since the early 19th century. In 1835, merchant Israel Wood Powell registered a village plan for Port Dover. By 1842, the village was growing and had a population of almost 400. The harbor, lighthouse, and bridge across the river had been completed as had the road to Hamilton; there was a grammar school, a grist mill, a sawmill and a Presbyterian church in the course of construction. In 1877, Port Dover was a large village with 1,100 residents, most living on the west bank of the River Lynn. The village was served by the Port Dover & Lake Huron Railway and a more substantial harbor had been completed. Records indicate that businesses include a foundry, many stores, a newspaper, wagon and carriage makers, and a busy school house. Port Dover became an incorporated village in 1879.

==== Port Rowan ====
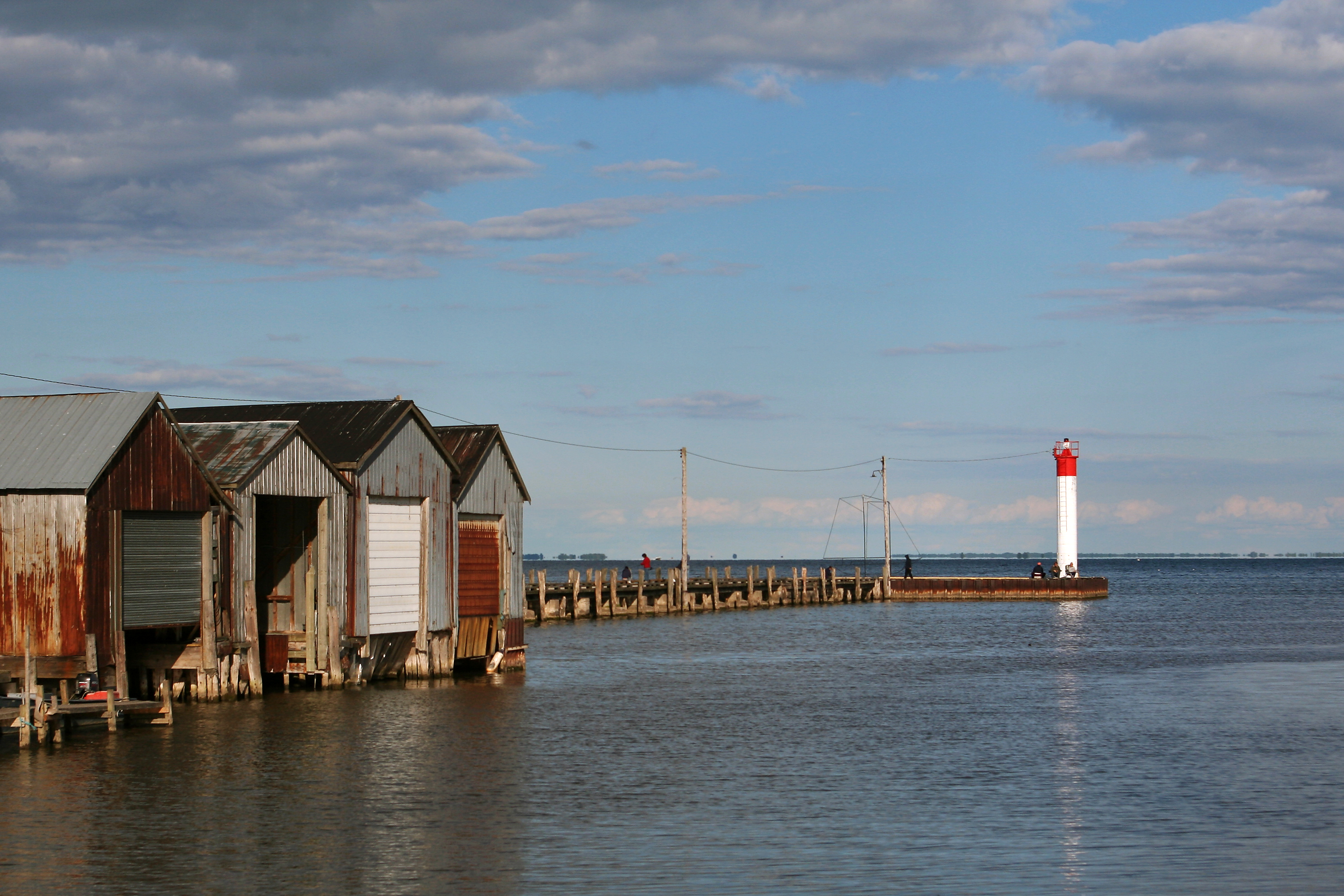
Lighthouse and dock in Port Rowan

Port Rowan (42.623918°N 80.45022°W) holds an annual Bayfest every Labour Day; this used to be known as "Tomato Fest" but was renamed a few years ago. Local sports include angling and boating in the Long Point Inner Bay. Bird Studies Canada is based at Port Rowan.

In 1845, Port Rowan was very small, with only 50 residents but had a store, tavern, post office and a collector of customs who worked with the shipping trade. Lumber became important between 1845 and 1850 so the population increased to 100 by 1845 and to 200 by 1850.

By 1877, Port Rowan had about 1,000 residents, many living in beautiful homes overlooking the lake. It was a successful commercial and industrial centre for those who lived in the general area. Fishing had also started and would continue through the 1900s. The village had three churches, a public hall, a Masonic Hall and a Temperance Hall.

Located just outside of town off Lakeshore Rd. is the famous Backus Mill, where every year there is a re-enactment of the War of 1812. This site was the location of a grain mill built by John Backhouse in the 1790s and was powered by water. The mill's mechanism was upgraded later in the 1800 and then in the early 1900s.

==== Port Ryerse ====
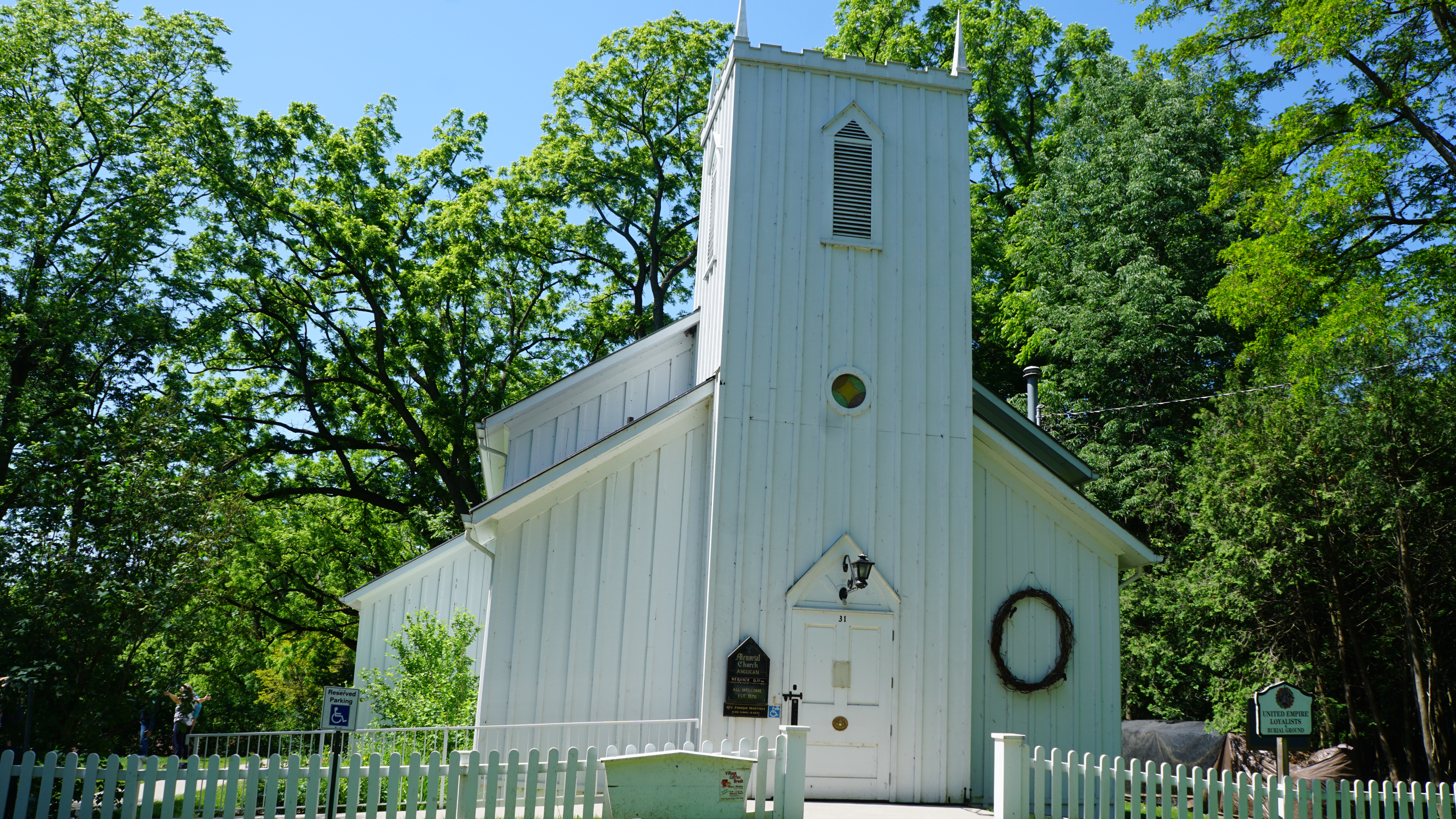
Memorial Anglican Church in Port Ryerse

Port Ryerse (42.759743°N 80.259247°W) is a fishing hamlet in Norfolk County just slightly southwest of Port Dover where people from Southwestern Ontario rent cottages and fish for pleasure during the summer months (Victoria Day through mid-October). The hamlet was founded by Lieut-Colonel Samuel Ryerse, brother of Colonel Joseph Ryerson and uncle of Egerton Ryerson. Its harbor was important for shipping cargo from Norfolk County across the lake.

Samuel Ryerse was a United Empire Loyalist who fought with the British during the American Revolution and came to Upper Canada in 1794 where he received 3000 acres of land. He built a grist mill at the mouth of Young's Creek and a settlement grew up around it. Ryerse remained involved with the military as Lieutenant of the County of Norfolk and was also the chairman of the Court of Quarter Sessions.

The mill was burned by American troops in 1814 during the War of 1812. In later years, two new gristmills were built at the same location but both burned down (in 1860 and in 1890). A brick schoolhouse was built in 1871.

=== R ===
==== Rattlesnake Harbour ====
Rattlesnake Harbour (42.879172°N 80.411596°W) is a hamlet in Norfolk County that is located north of Nixon. Despite the name, there is no harbour in Rattlesnake Harbour and agriculture is the main industry – not fishing. Rattlesnakes can be found among the wilderness, giving the name the same appeal to locals as Frogmore to the distant southwest.

==== Renton ====
Renton (42.859482°N 80.22028°W) is a hamlet in Norfolk County that is between Simcoe and Jarvis in Haldimand County. There was a truckers' diner (which burnt down in the spring of 2010) and there is also a golf course in the vicinity. Agriculture is the main industry and the population has remained stagnant over the past 20 years.

==== Rhineland ====
Rhineland is a hamlet in Norfolk County that has agriculture as the main industry. Commerce is absent and the hamlet has a church and rural housing. While tobacco is the crop of choice, lavender is being experimented as a possible replacement crop for the region. The program began as a government pilot program in 2003 and is providing a chance for a "one-industry area" to diversify into other industries to acclimatize itself into a changing global economy.

==== Rockford ====
Rockford (42.9168°N 80.1664°W) is a hamlet in Norfolk County that is located between Waterford and Hagersville. It used to have a church, general store and a baseball team. Now it is made up of farms and a few houses.

=== S ===
==== Silver Hill ====
Silver Hill is a hamlet that is southwest of Pine Grove and southeast of Tillsonburg. The main industry is agriculture. There is also an automobile repair shop and a residential district of houses and farms. The population of Silver Hill, Ontario is less than 100. To the south is Turkey Point and Lake Erie which leads to Pennsylvania in the United States of America. Students here go to Walsh Public School for grades kindergarten to eighth grade and Valley Heights Secondary School for their high school education.

==== Simcoe ====
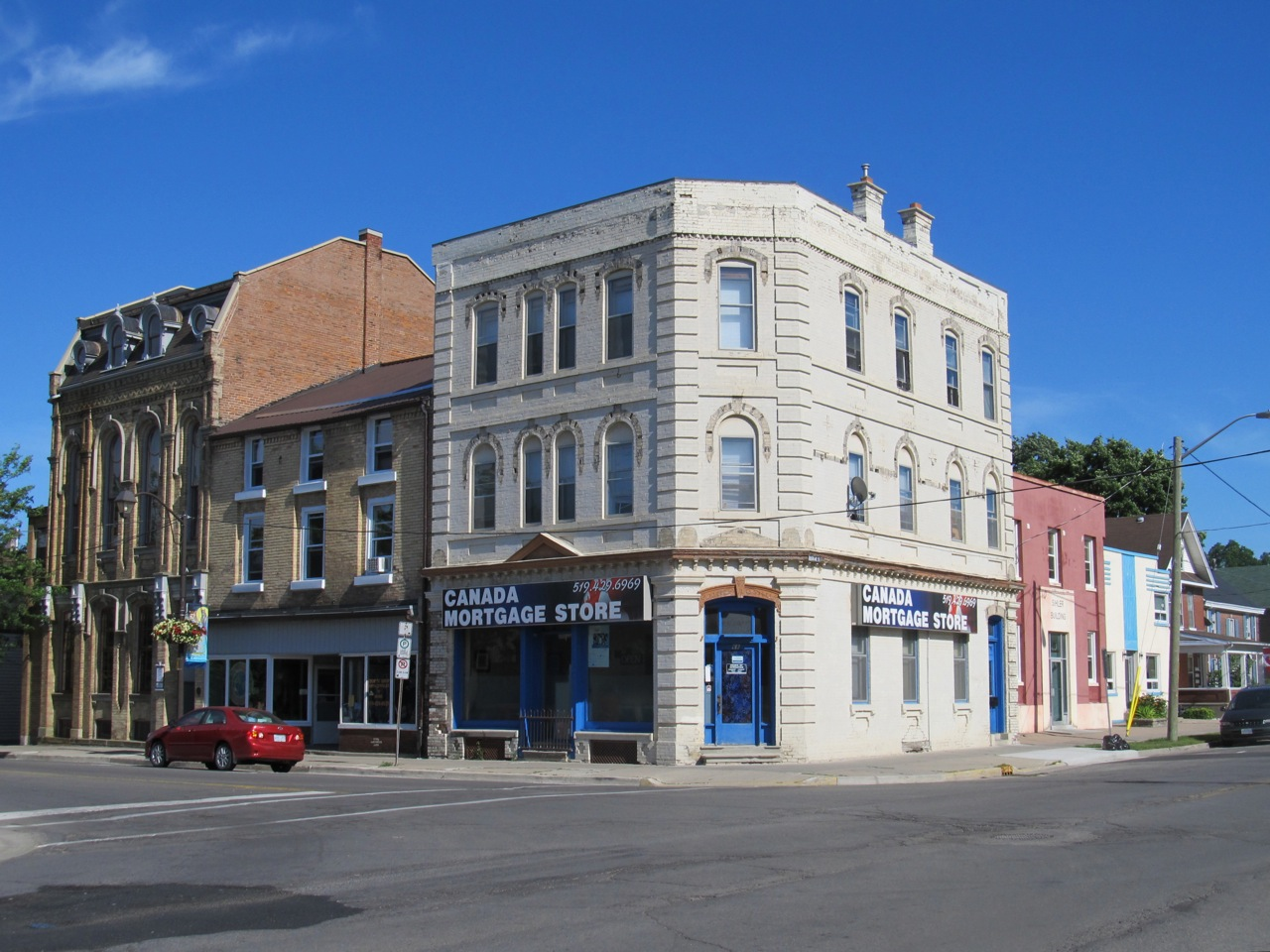
Colborne Street in Simcoe

Simcoe is the administrative centre of Norfolk County, with a population of 16,000 making it Norfolk's largest community. Simcoe is located at the junction of Highway 3, at Highway 24, due south of Brantford, Ontario, and accessible to Hamilton by nearby Highway 6. The town is northwest of Nanticoke in Haldimand County.

Simcoe was founded in 1795 by lieutenant governor John Graves Simcoe. Initially, the settlement consisted of two distinct areas, Birdtown, named by William Bird who arrived in the early 1800s and the Queensway which grew up around Aron Culver's sawmill and grist mill in the 1820s. The post office opened in 1829 and was called Simcoe. In 1837, the village became the seat of government of the then Talbot District.

Records from 1846 indicate that the settlement was far from any major roads and had little communication with areas outside of Brantford. A stone courthouse and jail had already been built. There were three churches, Methodist, Baptist, and Congregationalist and a weekly newspaper for the population of about 1,400. The post office was receiving mail daily. Already operating were two grist-mills, two sawmills, a brewery, two distilleries, a foundry, a fulling mill, nine stores, six taverns, two druggists, a bank (Gore) and many tradesmen.

The population in 1850 was about 1600; in that year, Simcoe became the County seat of Norfolk County. Simcoe was incorporated as a town in 1878 and had its own town council and mayor until December 31, 2000. In 2001, the town and all other municipalities within the Regional Municipality of Haldimand-Norfolk were dissolved and the region was divided into two single tier municipalities with city-status but called counties. Simcoe now forms Ward 5 of Norfolk County.

The town hosts the Lynn River Music and Arts Festival, the Norfolk County Fair and Horse Show, and a Christmas Panorama of Lights. As of 2019, Crystal Lake (along with Wellington Park that surrounds it) was the most ideal place for bird watching in Simcoe. At least 83 bird species had been discovered there between 1971 and 2019; including the Osprey, the Belted Kingfisher, and the Common Nighthawk.

==== St. Williams ====
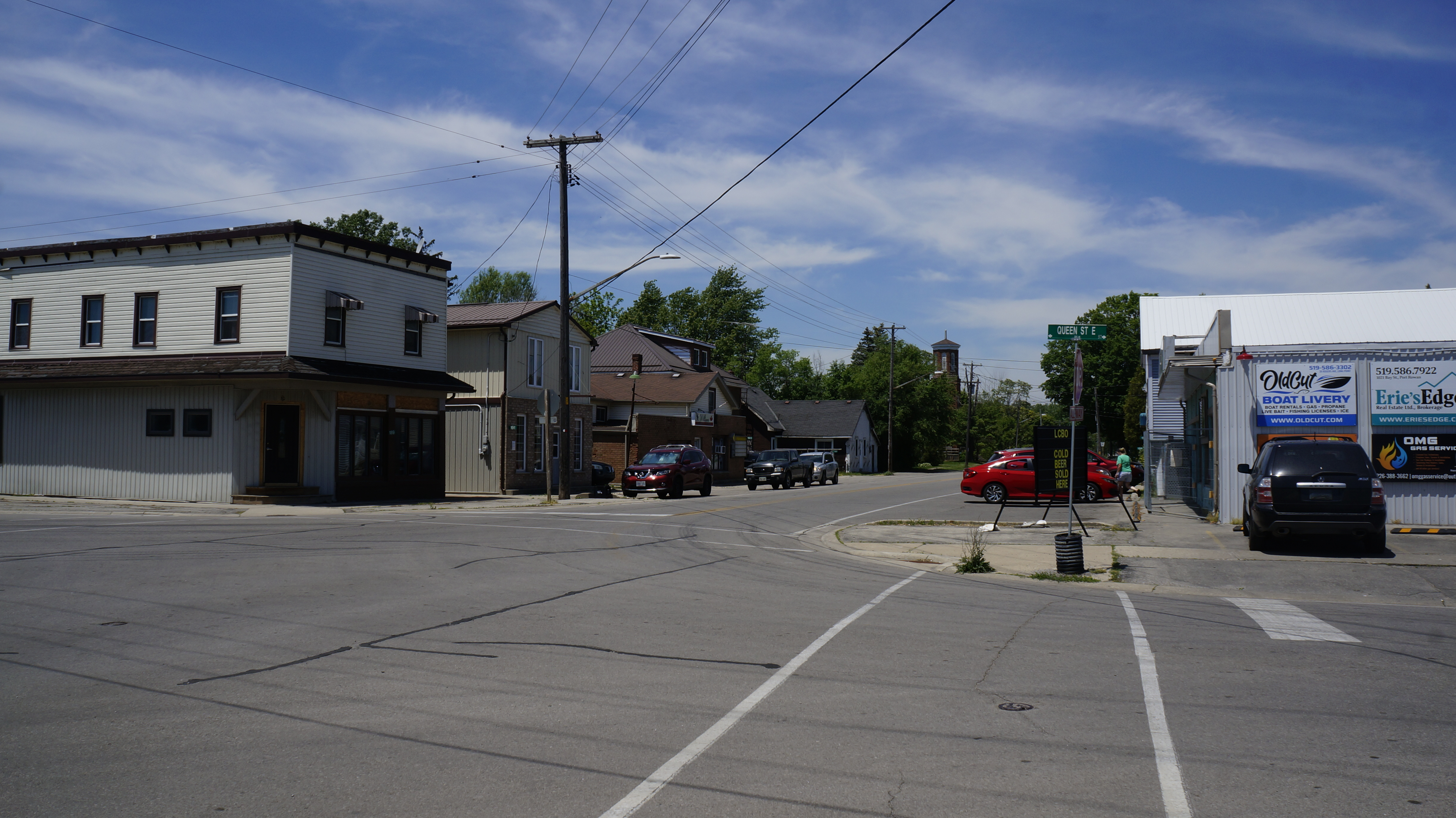
Downtown St. Williams

St. Williams (42.667354°N 80.415201°W) is a small hamlet and fishing community in Norfolk County. The lakeside community is located 30 minutes south of Pinegrove. St. Williams is about 30 minutes from both Simcoe and Tillsonburg. It is a village with a population of approximately 400 people.

=== T ===
==== Teeterville ====
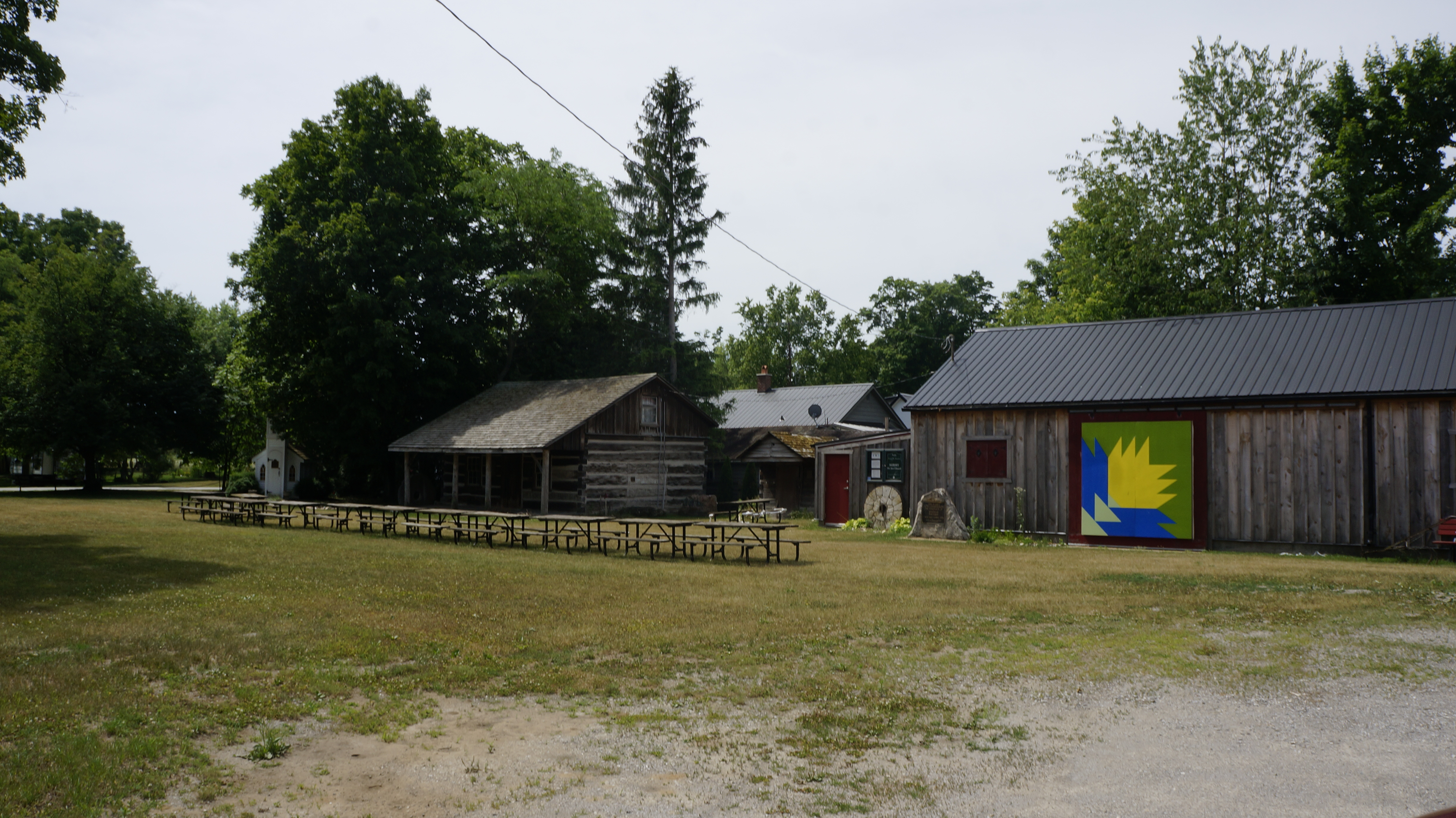
Teeterville Pioneer Museum

Teeterville (42.94568°N 80.443869°W) is a hamlet southwest of Vanessa. The main attraction of this town is the Teeterville Pioneer Museum. Agriculture is the main industry and commerce is very limited. There is also a public elementary school in the hamlet.

==== Turkey Point ====
Turkey Point (42.681047°N 80.332289°W) is a village in the former township of Charlotteville in what is now Norfolk County, Ontario. It is located on Long Point Bay south of Highway 24 on Regional Road 10, southwest of Simcoe. The village is also home to MacDonald Turkey Point Marina.

This community is referenced in the Three Dead Trolls in a Baggie song which was titled "The Toronto Song" as being terrible along with Sarnia.

John Graves Simcoe visited this area in 1795 and suggested that a settlement be laid out. Settlement began soon after that, and by 1800, law courts were being held here.

=== V ===
==== Vittoria ====
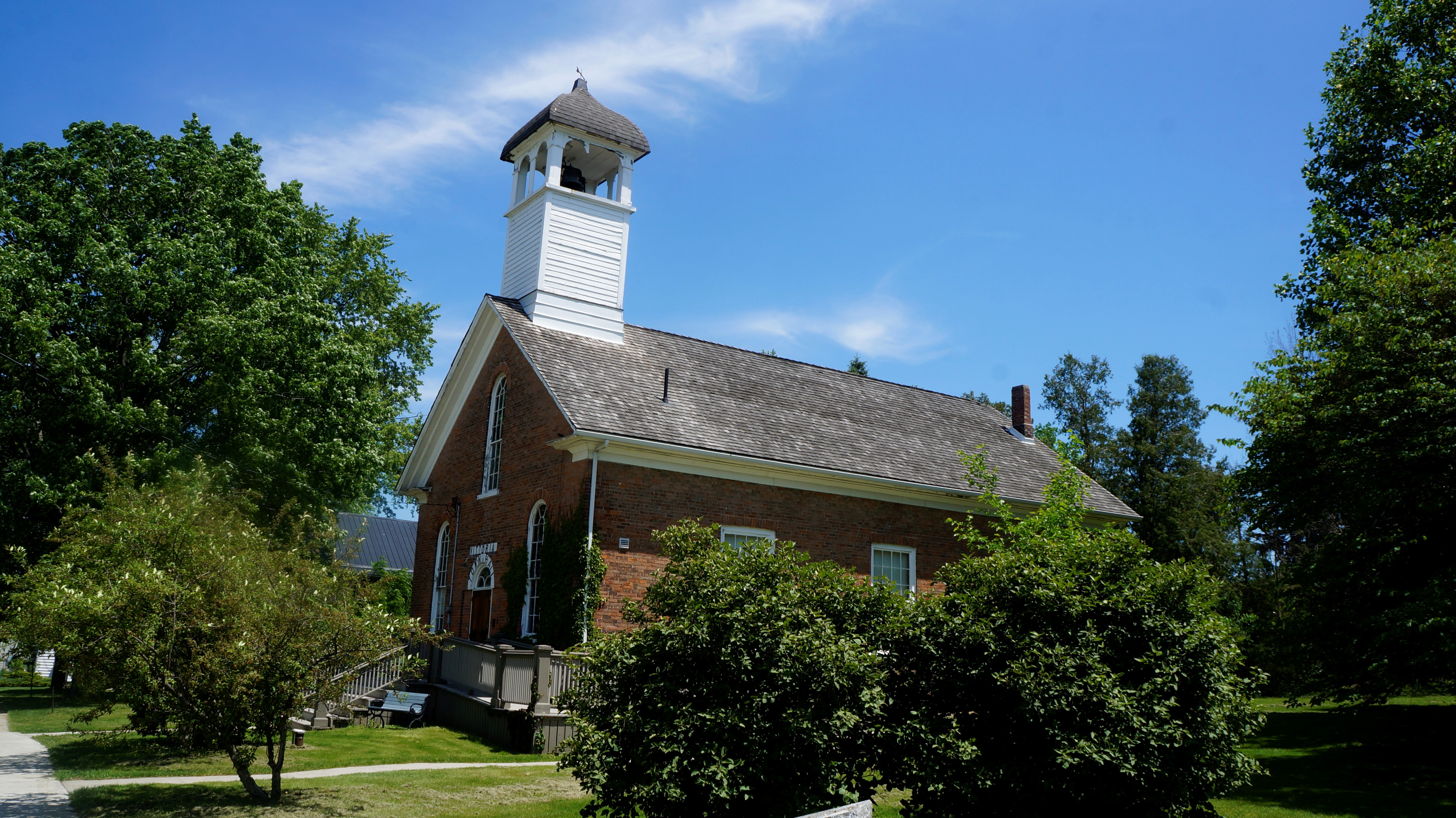
The Vittoria Town Hall

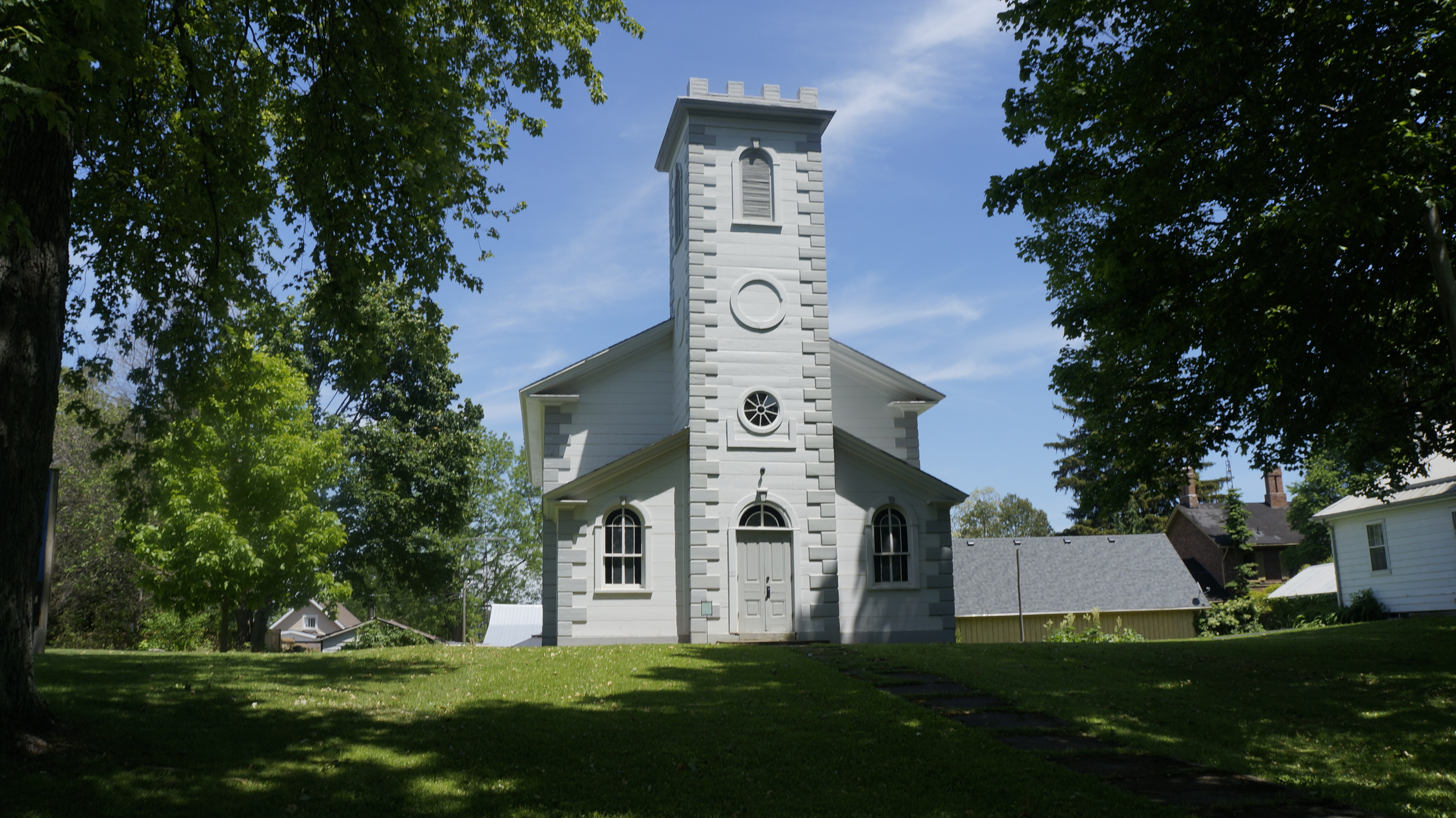
Christ Church - Vittoria, ON, built in 1844.

Vittoria (42.762705°N 80.322933°W) is a small village east of Walsh and southwest of Simcoe in Norfolk County. Noted today for being one of the most historic communities in Norfolk County it has a fire station, a community hall, a town hall, and three active churches. Built during the early to mid-1800s, the community was a vital hub, serving as the capital of the London District of Upper Canada from 1815 to 1825. The Courts of the London district were located here before moving to Simcoe.

Vittoria Baptist Cemetery is located on Charlotteville Road; having the distinction of being a United Empire Loyalists burial ground and containing the remains of at least 532 people. This cemetery has existed since 1804. This settlement was the birthplace of Egerton Ryerson (in 1803) a Methodist minister. Between 1844 and 1876, he was the chief superintendent of education for Upper Canada and was responsible for developing Upper Canada's education system.

=== W ===
==== Walsh ====
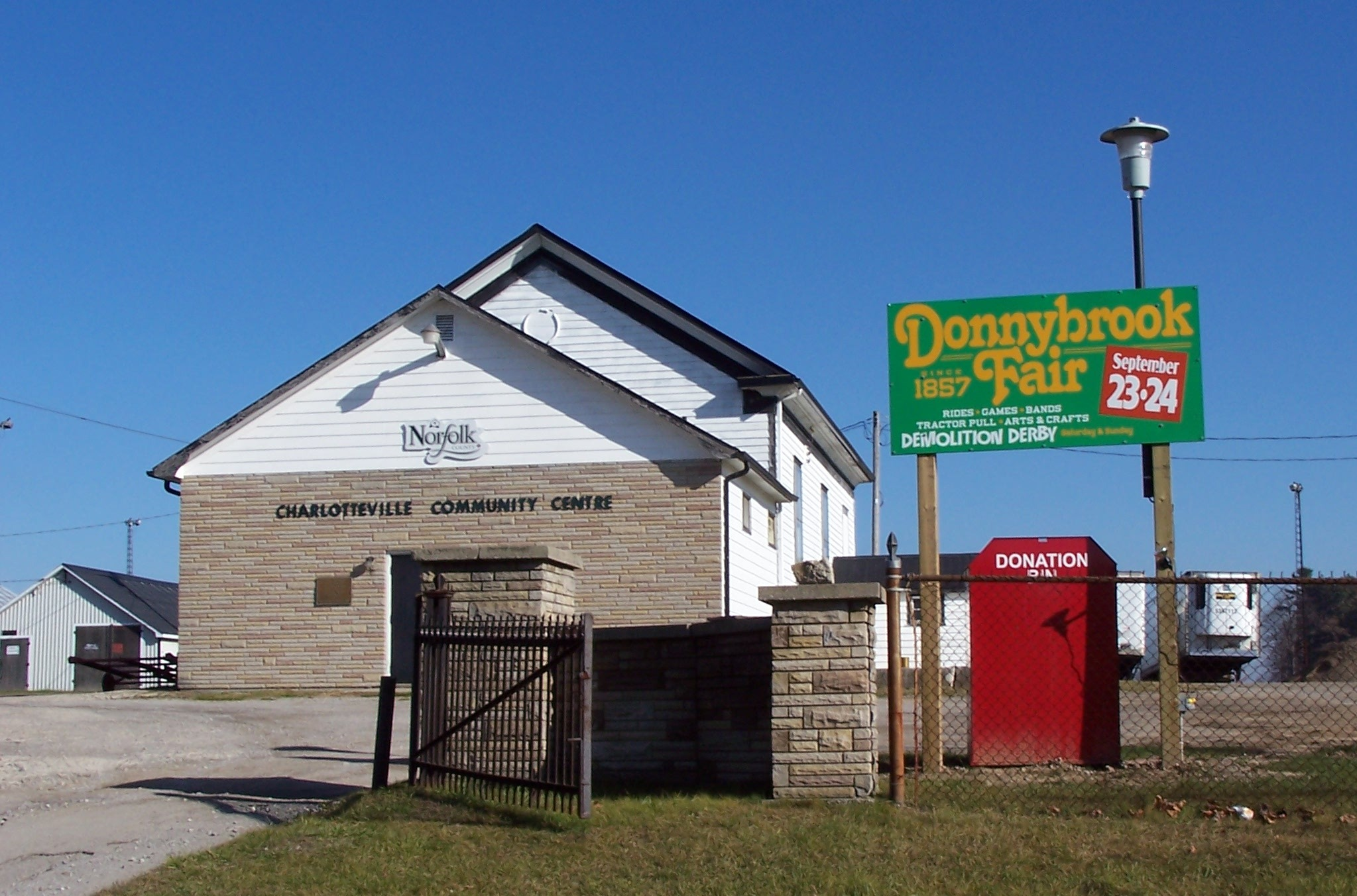
Community centre in Walsh

Walsh, formerly known as "Charlotteville Centre", is a medium-sized hamlet in Norfolk County that is home to Walsh Public School in the Grand Erie District School Board and St. Michael's Catholic Elementary School.

Since Walsh Public School is a rural school, farming is considered to be the primary source of income for most of the local families. Either one parent or both parents is usually employed in a workplace that is dependent on the local agriculture industry. While the grade 3 students are good readers at Walsh Public School, the grade 6 students perform equally well at reading and writing. Both the grade 3 and grade 6 students show a universal weakness in mathematics. Female students have a slight advantage over the male students when to comes to reading and math.

An annual fair held in the hamlet called the Donnybrook Fair attracts kids and adults from the area in the middle of September.

It has been held since 1857, with the fair growing in size and quality every year. Children who attend school within the immediate vicinity are allowed to enter any artwork that they produced themselves in addition to their own crafts and agriculture-related artifacts. They are typically between the ages of 5 and 13. Homeschooled children may also enter the contests. In the 2011 edition of the Donnybrook Fair, these local students have managed to win $1346 in tax-free cash. This monetary award encourages children to save up for higher education opportunities. The short-term effects of the award system encourages children to work on their innovative spirit and improve their work ethics. Although the winner of the Donnybrook Fair demolition derby is no longer assured a spot in the Norfolk County Fair version of the event, the prize money keeps increasing and the event is done over a traditional dirt track. Fundraising for the Donnybrook Fair involves a Victoria Day brunch, an annual spring barbecue, and numerous raffles.

==== Walsingham ====
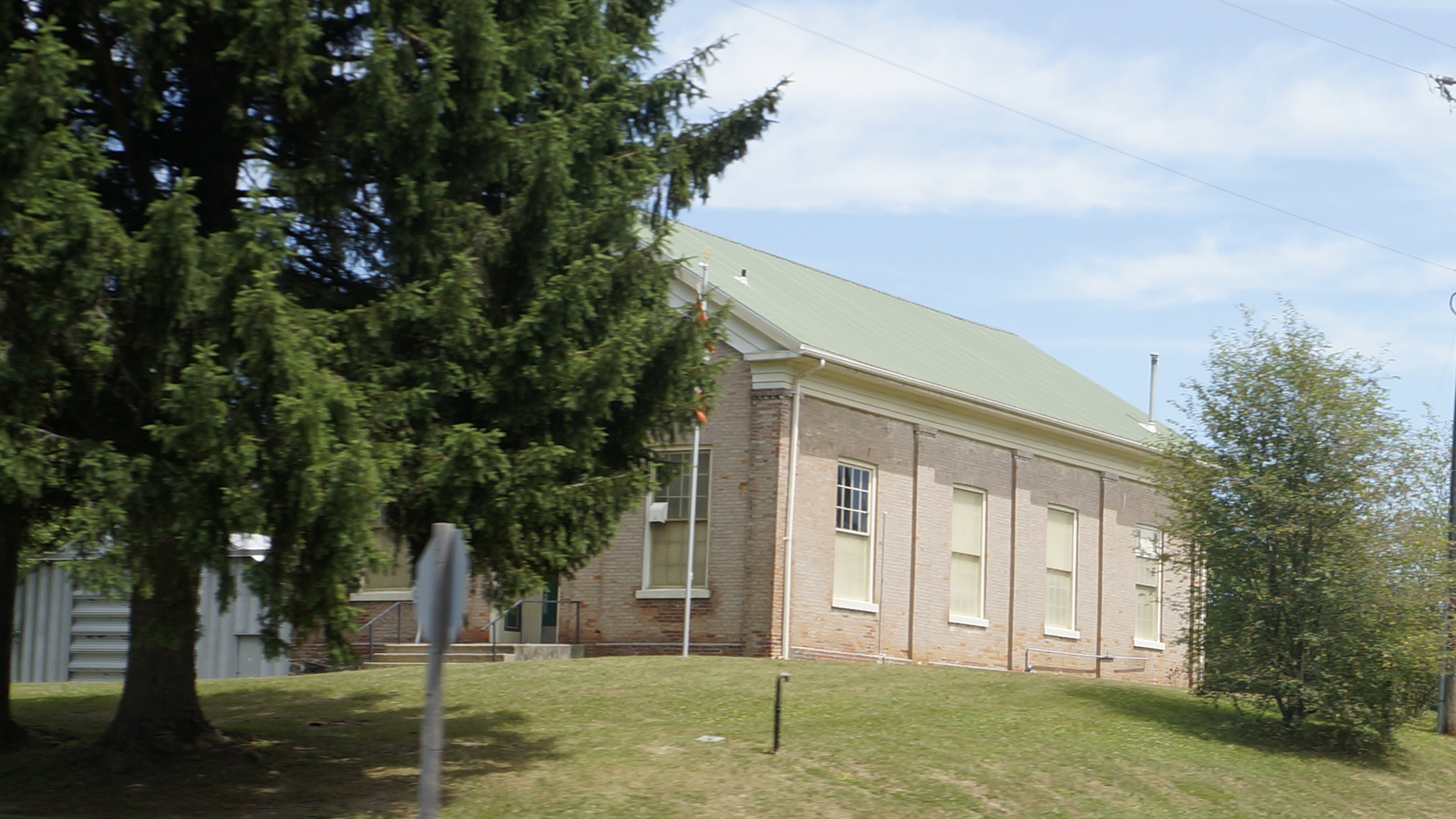
Township Hall, Walsingham

Walsingham is a hamlet in Norfolk County that is located south of Valley Heights Secondary School. Very close to this settlement, the land was purchased from the Mississauga First Nation and some families settled there by 1791. Others, including Loyalists who had fought in the American Revolution, arrived later at the so-called Long Point Settlement. The area was heavily treed and was important in the lumber industry until it closed in about 1878.

The farms and mills that had been built here were extensively damaged in 1814, during the War of 1812. Everything was rebuilt and the community was doing well by 1825.

==== Waterford ====
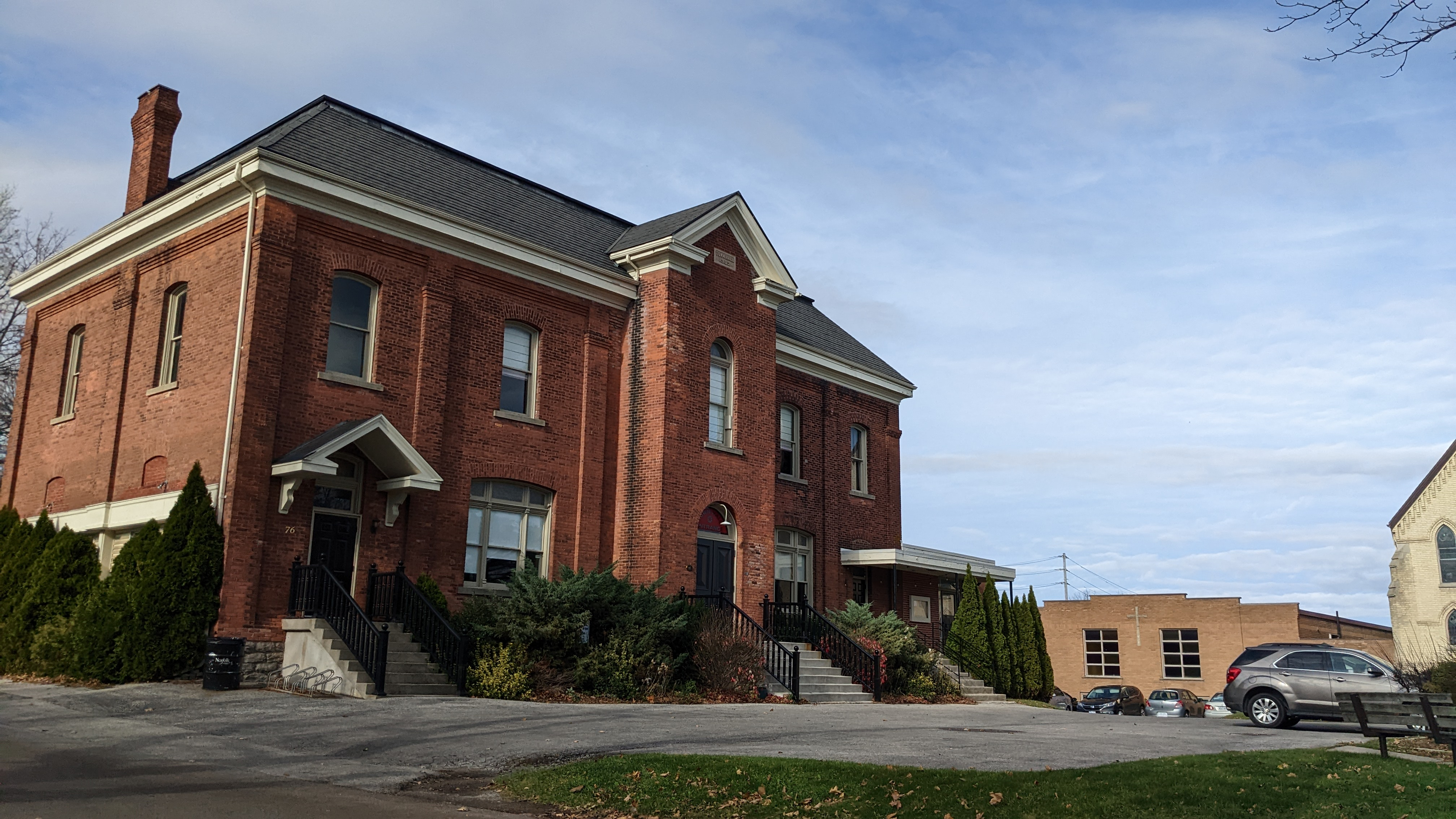
Old town hall in Waterford

Waterford sits on the old Canada Southern Railroad, preceding various other rail company takeovers, the latest of which was by CN/CP. The now idle line passes through Ontario between Buffalo, New York and Detroit, Michigan. An electric railroad once operated in Waterford; the official fare from Galt to Waterford was a mere $1.05 ($14.13 in today's money) while taking it to nearby Simcoe cost $1.25 plus taxes ($16.82 in today's money).

Established in 1794, this community was first established as a saw and grist mill community. by Paul Averill in 1800. It was called Sayles' Mills, Sovereign's Mills, Lodersville; the name was changed to Waterford when a post-office opened around 1826. Waterford became the northernmost marketplace in Norfolk County; complementing Simcoe as its centre marketplace. The village would become incorporated in 1878 when its population reached 1100 people.

In the early 1800s, this area was important in the lumber industry and also had many successful farms. The first settler was Job Slaght who also built the first grist mill. James L. Green who owned much of the village built a foundry that manufactured farm implements. Job Loder built the Finch mill and the old Gustin mill east of Vittoria as well as a sawmill. By 1851, Waterford contained the township hall and many industries, including a large agricultural implements factory built by James Green. The railway arrived in 1871 and helped increase growth, to 1,100 people by the time the village was incorporated in 1871.

==== Wilsonville ====
Wilsonville (42.99611°N 80.317869°W) is a hamlet in Norfolk County that is north of Waterford. It is considered to be the northernmost community in the Ontario tobacco belt. The main industry is agriculture and the housing also serves as a bedroom community to the town of Waterford to the south. Children from this community either attend Boston Public School for primary grades, followed by Waterford District High School or St. Bernard's of Clairvaux School for primary grades, followed by Holy Trinity Catholic High School in Simcoe.

==== Wyecombe ====
Wyecombe (42.779086°N 80.555191°W) is a small hamlet located on the intersection of East Quarter Line Road and County Road 21. Wyecombe is home to a quiet subdivision of approximately 25 houses and a local auto repair shop. The nearest elementary school is Langton Public School or Sacred Heart and the nearest high school is Valley Heights Secondary School.
