= Backstage Capitol Theatre =

Theatre in Delhi, Ontario

Coordinates: 42°51′20.11″N 80°29′48.79″W

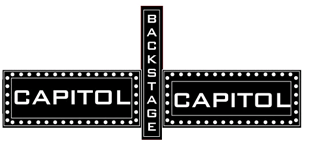
- Type: Theatre
- Location(s): 93 King St. Delhi, Ontario, Canada
- Website: http://www.backstagecapitol.com/

The Backstage Capitol Theatre was built in 1933 in Delhi, Ontario, Canada by Robert Hambleton on the site of the Community Hall that burnt down earlier that same year.

== Summary ==
The theatre was a focal point in the community for close to 40 years. Competition from television caused the theatre to close its doors in the late 1960s. It was later reopened as the Golden Leaf Restaurant and remained in operation until the late 1990s. Converted back into a theatre, the historic building is now known as the Backstage Capitol and is the home of a local dance and theatre groups. Delhi's Backstage Capitol Theatre, with its superior acoustics and intimate setting, attracts audiences and performers alike from all over North America. Open year-round, the theatre not only plays host to children's programs, live performances and concerts, it is also a sought after venue for weddings and other private functions with its European courtyard setting. Thousands of people looking for a unique venue have walked through the doors of the Theatre. Re-opened in 2008, the theatre has quickly become one of Norfolk's most popular destinations.
