= Gopher Dunes =

Dirt track in Norfolk County, Ontario, Canada

Coordinates: 42.825121°N 80.629005°W

- Location: 4385 Hwy 59; Courtland, Ontario, Canada; N0J 1E0
- Owner: Derek Schuster
- Operator: Gopher Dunes, Inc.
- Opened: 1986
- Major events: Motocross Facility

Gopher Dunes, located in Courtland, Ontario, is one of Canada’s leading off-road parks, renowned for its expansive trails, sand tracks, and competitive racing events. Since its founding in the 1980s, the park has become a cornerstone of the Canadian motocross community, drawing riders from across the country. Its reputation for hosting national motocross competitions, including the Triple Crown Series, has solidified its place as a premier off-road destination.

== History ==
The story of Gopher Dunes began in the early 1980s when Frank Schuster, a local farm owner, envisioned creating an off-road riding facility on his family’s farmland in Courtland, Ontario. Originally purchased by the Schuster family in 1972 for tobacco farming, the land gradually transformed as Frank's passion for motocross grew.

In 1979, Frank and his wife Barb founded Schuster Excavating, specializing in land renovation for tobacco farms. At the same time, Frank began developing a motocross track on the property, with the goal of supporting a growing off-road community. He partnered with longtime friend Dale Vranckx, who opened Odyssey Recreation, a Honda dealership located in a barn on the property. This partnership complemented the motocross track, providing riders with access to bikes and gear.

By 1986, Gopher Dunes officially opened with its first track, initially focused on ATV racing. The first event was a 24-hour ATV endurance race. The park soon expanded to host motocross races, with the first event taking place in 1987.

Frank's son, Derek Schuster, grew up immersed in the park’s operations. A skilled rider himself, Derek has played a crucial role in Gopher Dunes’ development, including establishing the Honda Canada GDR Fox Racing Team, which has become one of the most successful teams in Canadian motocross.

== Tracks and Trails ==
Gopher Dunes offers five professionally designed dirt bike tracks tailored to various skill levels, accommodating everyone from beginners to seasoned professionals. Riders can explore three distinct trail systems, each over 10 kilometers long, offering rugged, sandy terrain ideal for dirt bikes, ATVs, and side-by-sides. The challenging sand tracks are particularly famous for testing even the most experienced riders, earning the park a reputation as one of the toughest motocross venues in Canada.

== Events ==
The park hosts a wide range of events throughout the year, from professional motocross races like the Triple Crown Series to community events such as Tough Mudder. Spectators and participants alike gather for high-energy competitions and family-friendly activities. Community events often include bonfires, beach volleyball games, cornhole tournaments, and social gatherings that enhance the park’s welcoming atmosphere.

== Honda Canada GDR Fox Racing Team ==
Gopher Dunes is home to the Honda Canada GDR Fox Racing Team, a top motocross team in Canada. Competing in major national events, the team has built a legacy of excellence in motocross. Riders such as Dylan Wright have represented the team on the international stage at events like the Motocross of Nations. The team's consistent success has helped raise the profile of both the park and the sport within Canada.

== Training Programs ==
The park offers a variety of training programs catering to riders of all ages and skill levels. Its flagship program, Red Rider Training, sponsored by Honda, provides personalized instruction, safety equipment, and access to Honda CRF trail bikes for beginners and novice riders. More advanced riders can take part in Off-Road Training, which focuses on skill-building and technical riding on the park’s tracks and trails.

== Dirt Bike Rentals ==
For visitors without their own equipment, Gopher Dunes offers a rental program featuring Honda dirt bikes ranging from 50cc to 250cc models. Riders can rent bikes and essential protective gear such as helmets and gloves, ensuring a safe and enjoyable riding experience.

== Summer Camps ==
Gopher Dunes runs popular summer camps designed for kids and teens interested in off-road riding. These camps provide professional instruction, safety training, and outdoor activities like swimming and games. Combining skill development with fun, the camps offer an immersive experience for young riders looking to build confidence and enjoy the outdoors.

== Off- Grid Cabins and Amenities ==
For overnight visitors, Gopher Dunes offers several off-grid cabin rentals that provide a rustic but comfortable lodging experience. Cabins come with outdoor seating areas, BBQs, and fire pits, allowing guests to relax after a day of riding. The park’s pro shop offers snacks and drinks, gear, parts, and apparel, making it a convenient stop for riders looking to upgrade their equipment.

== Experiences ==
Beyond motocross, Gopher Dunes offers a well-rounded outdoor experience. Visitors can cool off in the park’s swim pond, play beach volleyball, and participate in community bonfires. With its combination of competitive racing, recreational activities, and family-friendly events, Gopher Dunes remains one of Canada’s top off-road destinations.

== Notable Competitions and Achievements ==
Over the years, Gopher Dunes has hosted numerous national motocross competitions, becoming a key stop on the Triple Crown Series circuit. Its demanding sand tracks have earned it the nickname “The Toughest Track in Canada.” Riders from the Honda Canada GDR Fox Racing Team have claimed numerous victories, including standout performances by Dylan Wright and other top competitors.
