= Friday the 13th motorcycle rally =

Motorcycle rally in Port Dover, Ontario, Canada

Coordinates: 42°47′12″N 80°12′11″W

Friday the 13th Motorcycle Rally
- Genre: Motorcycle rally
- Frequency: Every Friday the 13th
- Locations: Port Dover, Ontario, Canada
- Inaugurated: 1981
- Previous event: September 13, 2024
- Next event: June 13, 2025
- Attendance: Over 100,000
- Organiser: Port Dover Board of Trade
- Website: www.pd13.com

The Friday the 13th Motorcycle Rally is a motorcycle rally held every Friday the 13th in Port Dover, Ontario, Canada since 1981. Its typical summer attendance exceeds 100,000 bikers.

== Attendance ==
The event has been described as "the biggest single-day motorcycle event in the world," a title also claimed by the Rolling Thunder rally in the United States. Although hundreds of attendees arrive during winter months, attendance is at its highest when the date falls on a summer day. In August 2010, the rally drew more than 150,000 attendees. Estimates for the July 2012 event ranged from 90,000 to more than 170,000.

=== Guinness World Record attempt ===
An attempt in 2008 to surpass the previous Guinness world record for the largest motorcycle parade failed due to a technicality. More than 10,000 motorcycles would have exceeded the record set in 2006 by the Republic of Texas Biker Rally. Although the organizers were able to document participation by more than 12,000 motorcycles at Port Dover, they entered through multiple portals to the city and were disqualified by Guinness as a single parade.
