= Dennis' Horseradish =

Condiment grown in Norfolk County, Ontario, Canada

Coordinates: 42.80957°N 80.482922°W

- Creamed horseradish flavor of Dennis' Horseradish
- Company type: Private
- Industry: Food
- Founded: Delhi, Ontario Canada (1960)
- Headquarters: Delhi, Ontario, Canada
- Products: Primary crop: Horseradish
- Owner: Mark Whitmore; Mark Healy; Mark Vandenbosch
- Number of employees: 5
- Website: dennishorseradish.com

Dennis' Horseradish is a regional food item that is grown near Delhi, Ontario, Canada. The business has been in operation since 1960; selling their products at chain supermarkets in Ontario. Western Canada has been seen as a "target" market for Dennis' Horseradish. Currently, Dennis' Horseradish has been sold as far north as Lindsay, Ontario where it is a featured item at their farmers' market.

== Summary ==
The Dennis’ brand of horseradish is named after Dennis Gyorffy of the Gyorffy family who started their business in the basement of their home on North Street in Tillsonburg, Ontario in 1960.

The family was composed of Dennis and Mary Gyorffy and their sons Steve and Robert. All of the family pitched in to produce and distribute the product. The roots were purchased from Marshall Farms of Ancaster, Ontario. They were washed using wringer type washing machines. After cleaning and peeling, they were ground up in a large butcher type meat grinder attached by belt to an electric motor. Dennis experimented with various blades and screens in the grinder to achieve the desired consistency. The only mechanical aid used at the time was a filling machine which could be adjusted to dispense the exact amount in each jar. Jar caps and labels were applied manually. The home on North Street had a walk-in cooler to store both the fresh roots and the finished product. The varieties of product produced at the time included:

- Regular Horseradish
- Creamed Horseradish
- Beet and Horseradish Relish
- Seafood Cocktail Sauce
- Hot Mustard

The family distributed their products from Windsor to Ottawa and as far north as Sudbury. Customers ranged from small butcher shops and delicatessens to larger independent supermarkets such as the IGA chain. Since the sons were not interested in continuing the business, Dennis sold it to John Hantz in 1969 and retired. Dennis died in 1985 but the business, label, and brand remain for now.

All products are kosher in order to comply with Jewish dietary laws. The farm and retail booth are located on 10 Arnold Sayeau, only ten minutes driving distance from nearby Lynedoch. There is free parking located on the property and the retail booth is completely accessible by wheelchair. All crops are grown and harvested in Norfolk County. Dennis' Horseradish comes in several flavors; ranging from hot horseradish to seafood-flavored horseradish. All servings come in a glass bottle containing 250 millilitres or 0.066 US gallons of the food product.

Originally acquired by the John Hantz family, it was bought out by the Ed DeHooghe and Jason Ryder families in 2008. In 2020, the company was sold to the Whitmore, Healy, and Vandenbosch families to continue this great horseradish tradition. All the crops are grown under 30 acres (1,300,000 sq ft) of land. The roots that are found in horseradish have been recently used to prevent bloating in livestock animals. As a part of the recent trend for people living in the Greater Toronto Area to eat local products, Dennis' Horseradish provides anti-inflammatory agents in addition to combating bacteria and boosting the metabolism.

They refrigerate all their food products on the premises.
