= Ride Norfolk =

Public transportation service in Canada

- Founded: 2011
- Headquarters: 95 Culver Street, Simcoe
- Service area: Norfolk County, Ontario
- Service type: bus service
- Routes: 5
- Stops: Simcoe, Delhi, Port Dover, Port Rowan, Waterford, St. Williams, Langton, Walsh, Greens Corners, Bills Corners, Courtland, Vittoria, Turkey Point, Port Ryerse
- Daily ridership: 60 people per day
- Operator: YourTaxi
- Website: norfolkcounty.ca/transit

Ride Norfolk is a provider of public transportation within the single-tier municipality of Norfolk County, Ontario, Canada.

The program was originally classified as a "pilot project" and given the deadline of September 30, 2012 to prove its feasibility in the Norfolk County region. It was declared a permanent fixture in the region on May 16, 2012 after being deliberated before city council. Owing to its long-term status as a municipal program, Ride Norfolk (and Norfolk County Council) became eligible for nearly $90,000 per annum in gas tax subsidies. It appears to serves as a spiritual successor to the now-defunct Simcoe Coach Lines; which operated in the 1950s and operated to four different communities including the hamlet of Vittoria.

According to a past issue of the Port Dover Maple Leaf newspaper, Ride Norfolk has been approved to continue operations through the end of 2013. All buses operating for Ride Norfolk operate on diesel fuel and were manufactured in 2011 by the Ford Motor Company.

== Summary ==
Originally, the bus service only traveled to the major communities of Simcoe, Delhi, Port Dover, Port Rowan, and Waterford. It only recently made stops in the smaller communities of St. Williams and Langton. The service officially started in 2011 and was operated by Sharp Bus Lines who also operate the school bus system in the county. Service is from Monday to Friday; with no services on Saturdays, Sundays, on major statutory holidays, or after 6:00 P.M..

Bus service originally did not travel to any of the major shopping centers, instead making trips to the Norfolk library, the senior citizens' home, the different pharmacies, and the Norfolk General Hospital; a 2012 rerouting of the agency's services now places stops at Simcoe's Wal-Mart and Whitehorse Plaza. However, it is expected that the mass transit program will someday be hooked into a larger regional system of mass transit for the entire Southern Ontario region. The original budget of Norfolk County's mass transit system was finalized at $20,700 ($28,371.79 with inflation added on); a small contribution to a cleaner future considering that Norfolk County has been without a safe and publicly accessible form of mass transit for many years.

One of the negative features discovered by local residents was that a typical Port Dover-Simcoe round trip once had a cost of $12; which made it an expensive proposition for the people who need mass transit services. While the fare being offered by the local mass transit service at that time was cheaper than typical taxi fares in Norfolk County, it was still more expensive than other mass transit routes in Ontario. As of January 3, 2012, fares were reduced to $2 for a ride on the Simcoe service and $6 for a trip to Simcoe along any of the other routes ($5 if the ticket are purchased in bulk). It costs Norfolk County council $80/ride for the buses to operate; meaning that they have subsidized for approximately 75% of the transportation costs.

=== Social need ===
As a project to support the social needs of the region, it is projected to help abused women escape their hostile situations without relying on other people for transportation. It might never be profitable in a rural area to conduct mass transit so Ride Norfolk is basically a vital community project. Other rural communities may learn from Norfolk County's precedence and create a bus service catering their residents. There is less money lost on Ride Norfolk than it takes to operate the various ice hockey arenas, swimming pools and baseball diamonds; making Ride Norfolk pay off dividends in the social (but not the financial) department.

Terminating the Ride Norfolk program at any time will revert the municipality to the situation of lacking sufficient transportation for those who cannot afford automobiles. Norfolk County's rural nature and lack of public transportation options between the dissolution of the Simcoe Coach Lines services of the 1950s and the adoption of the Ride Norfolk program in the 21st century have traditionally made the automobile the only viable choice for Norfolk County residents in the past. While seniors have depended on reduced fare taxi tokens to get around Simcoe in the past, official encouragement to use Ride Norfolk instead has caused them to terminate the taxi tokens for senior citizens as of May 1, 2013. A significant number of people who live in Norfolk County were born prior to the Second World War and are unaware of the advantages and disadvantages of travelling by bus as opposed to private taxi. Seniors cannot afford to purchase their own vehicles; as the average cost of a budget vehicle starts around $17,000 and gas prices have a tendency to fluctuate between $1.03 a litre and $1.32 a litre. Unlike a traditional mass transit service like London Transit or Brantford Transit, bus drivers are given total decision making rights as to what roads are used to get from community to community.

Nearly 20 people a day utilize this bus service as it delivers passengers through the five major communities of Norfolk County. The inadequate bus scheduling for the major town of Simcoe has been seen as a reason not to ride the transit service. The total cost of operations for Norfolk Ride in 2012 was estimated to be nearly $300,000; which is almost the same as every eligible taxpayer paying $150 upfront for the service. This money could put a lot of taxis on the road and hire more people than the bus service. However, the taxi service in the region has been known for being expensive and inconsiderate of the social needs of the lower-income people (particularly retired people, unemployed people, stay-at-home parents and the disabled people who are capable of living independently within the community).

By having a bus service for these people instead of having multiple cabs on the road, it would help curb emissions and bring an element of carpooling to people who would otherwise never experience it.

== Route list ==
- Simcoe loop (weekday daily service)
- Brantford (3x weekday daily service)
- Delhi-Waterford-Simcoe (Mondays)
- St. Williams-Walsh-Pt.Rowan-Simcoe (Tuesdays)
- Delhi-Courtland-Tilsonburg-Langton-Simcoe (Wednesdays)
- Waterford-Pt. Dover-Simcoe (Thursdays)
- Waterford-Pt. Dover-Simcoe (Fridays)
- Port Dover-Pt. Ryerse-Turkey Point-Vittoria-Simcoe (Fridays)

== See also ==
- Public transport in Canada
