= Lynedoch, Ontario =

Community of Norfolk County, Ontario, Canada

Lynedoch is a village in Norfolk County, Ontario, Canada, and was named after Baron Lynedoch who served under Lord Wellington during the War of 1812.

Lynedoch is located northwest of Pine Grove, southwest of Delhi, and west of Simcoe.

== History ==
Lynedoch's earliest known inhabitants, from around 1000-1350 AD, were the Algonquin nation. They were noted flint-workers and evidence of their skill in crafting arrowheads is still to be found in open worked field areas surrounding the village. The next wave of inhabitants were the Attawandaron nation, the Neutrals, who occupied the region from about 1350 until their absorption by the Iroquois in the year 1651. The last significant native nation to occupy the area was the Mississaugas.

During the 19th century, this hamlet had a post office, a school, tailor’s and blacksmith shops, taverns, hotels, and churches.

== Industry ==
Agriculture is the main industry in the community. Residents can purchase Dennis' Horseradish from the Jason Ryder family farm just five minutes' driving distance to the east; they are a third-generation agriculture family in the area.
