= Delhi, Ontario =

Community of Norfolk County, Ontario, Canada

- Unincorporated hamlet in Norfolk County
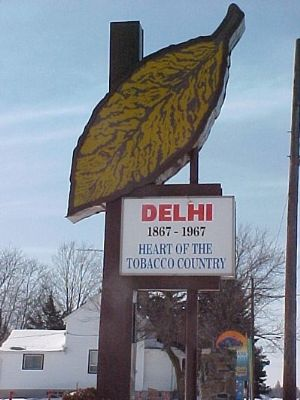
- Motto: "The heart of tobacco country"
- Location in southern Ontario
- Coordinates: 42°51′9″N 80°29′56″W
- Country: Canada
- Province: Ontario
- Established: 1826 as Sovereen's Corners
- Incorporated: 1893
- Amalgamated into Delhi Township: 1974
- Amalgamated into Norfolk County: 2001

Government
  - Mayor: Amy Martin
  - Governing Body: The Council of The Corporation of Norfolk County
  - MPs: Leslyn Lewis (Con)
  - MPPs: Bobbi Ann Brady (Independent)

Area
  - Land: 2.97 km^{2} (1.15 sq mi)
- Elevation: 210 m (690 ft)

Population (2011)
  - Total: 4,172
  - Density: 1,405.4/km^{2} (3,640/sq mi)
- Time zone: UTC-5 (EST)
  - Summer (DST): UTC-4 (EDT)
- Forward sortation area: N4B
- Area codes: (519), (226)
- Website: www.norfolkcounty.ca

Delhi (/ˈdɛlhaɪ/; DEL-hy) refers to both a former township and unincorporated community located off of the junction of Ontario Highways 59 and 3. Delhi is known as the "Heart of Tobacco Country." Prior to 1880, the community was known for its lumber industry. A community of Norfolk County, Delhi, had a population of 4,240 at the time of the 2016 Census.

Founded by Frederick Sovereen (spelled "Sovereign" by a few sources), the settlement was called Sovereen's Corners or Sovereign's Corners and was located in Middleton Township. Later, the community was renamed Fredericksburg and in 1856 to its present-day name of Delhi. The name is usually attributed locally to a postmaster honouring the major city of Delhi, India.

== History ==
Frederick Sovereen (or Sovereign) settled here in about 1812. According to some genealogy records, his father was called Jacob Zavering, Zafrin, or Safrein. The records suggest that the family moved to Norfolk County in Upper Canada because of the Revolutionary War in the U.S. Joseph Lawson bought land at about the same time as Frederick Sovereen (or Sovereign) but did not actually build a home in the area for some time. The village was named Fredericksburg after Sovereen until the post office opened under the name of Delhi. Sovereen was a tavern keeper for more than 30 years. He also manufactured plug tobacco, growing his own leaves, curing them, and pressing them. He donated the land for the Baptist church and served as the deacon for "many, many years".

The population in 1869 was 300, and the village had some manufacturing as well as a lumber mill thanks to the abundant water power. The post office was receiving mail daily. The railway that arrived in the 1870s was a definite benefit to locals who opened businesses such as the Delhi Canning Company, established in 1878; the company shipped canned local produce across Canada.

The village initially had a log schoolhouse, but a new school was built in 1892. By around 1900, the village had an opera house, two tanneries, a railroad station, an Orange Hall, and a Mechanics' Institute as well as a flour mill, the Quance Mills or Sovereen-Quance Mills. At the time, the primary crops in the area were still fruit and vegetables.

Delhi Cemetery was first established sometime in the 19th century. While it was originally a cemetery exclusively for residents who were members of the Roman Catholic Church, changes in cemetery policy made it possible to have anyone buried on their property. At least 4,372 individuals or families have been buried there. Fifteen people from the Delhi area who were killed in the First World War are buried in this cemetery. The last names of the graves belong to different ethnic groups ranging from English, French, Canadian, Eastern European, and those of Belgian descent. There are even a few Chinese families buried within the cemetery, and a large number of tombstones are written in languages other than English.

In the 1960s, Delhi had its own police station, complete with its own jail. Until the 1970s, most non-essential services and businesses closed earlier on Wednesday afternoons. Other economic factors, including the abolition of Canada's blue laws in 1985, eventually forced most businesses to operate seven days a week.

In 1974, the Town of Delhi was amalgamated with the Township of Charlotteville and the Township of Windham to form the Township of Delhi. The Township's administrative centre was located in the community of Delhi. In 2001 Delhi amalgamated with Norfolk, Simcoe and the western half of Nanticoke to form an enlarged Norfolk.

Delhi experienced a state of economic stagnation with the early-2000s decline in the tobacco industry; this problem has also affected the rest of the Ontario tobacco belt, including the nearby community of Tillsonburg. People who live in the Delhi area say that farming in the area started becoming highly unprofitable.

While Quance Dam received all-time high water levels during the unusually warm winter of 2009, recent droughts and the erosion of the older portion of the dam are putting the future of this local public works facility into jeopardy. Partly inactive since the 1930s, it was sold to the Quance family in 1987. The newest part of Quance Dam was completed in 1995 once plans to convert it into a hydroelectric plant fell through. More than 1000 fish pass through Quance Dam on an annual basis; a great decrease since 1959 when more than 4000 fish would pass through. The reason for the collapse in fish population was sedimentation, the introduction of stocked fish, and human development.

=== Old Delhi train station ===
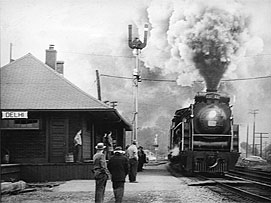
Old Delhi Train Station

The St. Thomas and Eastern Railway started operations in the area on November 9, 1998. It is a shortline railroad that serves places like St. Thomas and Tillsonburg that lack the feasibility for service by a Class I rail carriers like Canadian National or Canadian Pacific. The primary customer for the St. Thomas and Eastern Railway in Delhi is Growmark, Inc. (formerly the Norfolk Co-Op).

A railway station for passengers was located on the corner of William and Main streets (42.848825°N 80.500937°W) prior to the 1970s. While the railways were originally thought to be the way to ship cargo in and out of Delhi, the faster and cheaper truck convoys eventually won the day, bringing an increase in traffic volumes and smog into the community. Major products like ethanol, rye, agricultural chemicals, and fertilizer products are sent back and forth between Delhi and St. Thomas.

== Geography ==
There are hills on several of the town roads, particularly on Old Mill Road, William Street, Western Avenue, and Talbot Road. Most of Delhi is situated on flat land. The streets that are in older neighborhoods tend not to have sidewalks, making urban trail walking a perilous adventure. Shops in addition to a war memorial and the park at Quance Dam are considered to within a reasonable walking distance from the houses and apartments. The overall difficulty of walking through Delhi is considered to be easy.

A bus service makes scheduled trips to the major communities of Simcoe, Delhi, Port Dover, Port Rowan, and Waterford. Service is from Monday to Friday, with no services on Saturdays, Sundays, on major statutory holidays, or after 6:00 P.M.

There is a valley that spans a distance of 5 kilometres or 3.1 miles between Delhi and Lynedoch that contains remnants of Ontario's original old-growth Carolinian forest, adding up to just over 1 square mile (2.6 km^{2}). The major highway route connecting this community to Port Talbot was constructed primarily on an old Aboriginal trail.

North Creek joins Big Creek at Delhi, eventually draining into Lake Erie at Port Rowan.

=== Climate ===
Delhi has a humid continental climate (Köppen Dfb). Winters are cold with a January average of −5.0 °C (23.0 °F) in January and most days have maximum temperatures below 0 °C (32 °F). Though winters are cold, mild stretches of weather can bring temperatures above 10 °C (50 °F) in January. The average annual snowfall is 133 centimetres (52 in), with maximum accumulations of it occurring in February when the snow depth averages over 10 centimetres (4 in). Summers are warm and humid with a July high of 27.5 °C (81.5 °F) and a July low of 15 °C (59 °F). Temperatures above 30 °C (86 °F) occur 15 days per year. The average annual precipitation is 965 millimetres (38 in), which is relatively evenly distributed throughout the year. Delhi averages 2021 hours of bright sunshine per year or 43% of daylight hours, ranging from a low of 21.2% in December to 62.2% in July.

Climate data for Delhi (1991-2020)
Month	Jan	Feb	Mar	Apr	May	Jun	Jul	Aug	Sep	Oct	Nov	Dec	Year
Record high °C (°F)	18.3 (64.9)	16.0 (60.8)	27.3 (81.1)	29.5 (85.1)	33.4 (92.1)	36.7 (98.1)	40.6 (105.1)	36.7 (98.1)	36.1 (97.0)	31.7 (89.1)	25.0 (77.0)	19.5 (67.1)	40.6 (105.1)
Mean daily maximum °C (°F)	−1.1 (30.0)	−0.1 (31.8)	5.1 (41.2)	12.6 (54.7)	19.9 (67.8)	25.2 (77.4)	27.5 (81.5)	26.3 (79.3)	22.4 (72.3)	15.0 (59.0)	8.0 (46.4)	1.9 (35.4)	13.6 (56.5)
Daily mean °C (°F)	−5.0 (23.0)	−4.5 (23.9)	0.3 (32.5)	6.8 (44.2)	13.6 (56.5)	19.0 (66.2)	21.2 (70.2)	20.1 (68.2)	16.4 (61.5)	10.0 (50.0)	3.9 (39.0)	−1.7 (28.9)	8.4 (47.1)
Mean daily minimum °C (°F)	−8.9 (16.0)	−8.8 (16.2)	−4.4 (24.1)	1.1 (34.0)	7.2 (45.0)	12.8 (55.0)	14.9 (58.8)	14.0 (57.2)	10.3 (50.5)	4.9 (40.8)	−0.2 (31.6)	−5.0 (23.0)	3.2 (37.8)
Record low °C (°F)	−33.9 (−29.0)	−34.1 (−29.4)	−25.0 (−13.0)	−15.0 (5.0)	−6.1 (21.0)	−1.7 (28.9)	3.3 (37.9)	−0.6 (30.9)	−3.9 (25.0)	−9.4 (15.1)	−18.9 (−2.0)	−28.0 (−18.4)	−34.1 (−29.4)
Average precipitation mm (inches)	81.3 (3.20)	58.0 (2.28)	70.8 (2.79)	87.4 (3.44)	87.6 (3.45)	81.5 (3.21)	88.6 (3.49)	79.5 (3.13)	85.8 (3.38)	86.1 (3.39)	82.6 (3.25)	76.3 (3.00)	965.2 (38.00)
Average rainfall mm (inches)	36.8 (1.45)	30.0 (1.18)	62.3 (2.45)	79.7 (3.14)	83.6 (3.29)	83.2 (3.28)	86.1 (3.39)	85.8 (3.38)	98.1 (3.86)	83.5 (3.29)	91.1 (3.59)	57.6 (2.27)	877.6 (34.55)
Average snowfall cm (inches)	33.3 (13.1)	29.7 (11.7)	20.9 (8.2)	5.6 (2.2)	0.1 (0.0)	0 (0)	0 (0)	0 (0)	0 (0)	0.5 (0.2)	9.0 (3.5)	33.7 (13.3)	132.7 (52.2)
Average precipitation days (≥ 0.2 mm)	14.4	12.4	12.6	13.0	11.9	10.4	10.5	9.4	11.3	11.6	13.8	14.6	146.0
Average rainy days (≥ 0.2 mm)	4.6	4.2	8.4	11.9	11.9	10.4	10.5	9.4	11.3	11.6	11.6	7.5	113.2
Average snowy days (≥ 0.2 cm)	10.5	9.0	5.2	1.4	0.04	0	0	0	0	0.12	2.4	8.3	37.0
Mean monthly sunshine hours	84.0	98.6	132.3	189.3	242.5	272.1	289.1	251.1	179.1	139.2	84.3	59.6	2,021.1
Source 1: Environment Canada
Source 2: Environment Canada

== Demographics ==
Until 2001, Delhi was located within the Township of Delhi, a municipal government within the Regional Municipality of Haldimand-Norfolk. Delhi continues to have several subdivisions located nearby, including Pinegrove, Gilbertville, and Atherton. Prior to the amalgamation of Norfolk County, the population of the former Township of Delhi was 16,365 in the Canada 2001 Census. The majority of the residents at that time were married Anglophones who were born in Canada.

Even though Delhi is home to a number of Roman Catholic churches, the majority of residents in Delhi during the early 2000s were Protestant. The population includes a sizable number of residents with Dutch, Portuguese, Caribbean, Ukrainian, French, British, and First Nation ancestry.

As of 2016, the majority of Delhi's residents speak English as a first language and were born in Canada. Females outnumber males, and working-age people outnumber children and elderly people. Delhi will experience a surge in old-age pensioners by the year 2026. Seventy people were born in the United States of America, while 250 were born in Europe. Ten residents were born in Africa, while 20 residents were born in Asia.

== Economy ==
Farming remains the predominant local industry, with tobacco and ginseng as the main cash crops. While Delhi used to be a place where transient adolescent workers could find employment quickly, the local police force started to take a less tolerant stand towards these job seekers in the later years. Local farms rely in part upon the Caribbean and Central American workers, who usually arrive around mid-to-late April and return to their homelands around early-to-mid November. Recent years have seen migrant workers complaining of unequal treatment and economic hardships in the hands of local farmers. Proper Spanish-language services for these offshore workers are only available in Simcoe, where these businesses tend to prosper during the farming months and be vacant buildings during the winter.

Three manufacturing plants once were located here; Delhi Industries, Delhi Foundry, and Delhi Metal Products. They both closed due to the changing Canadian economy that emphasized more on service jobs than jobs in traditional manufacturing fields. Delhi Industries lasted until the midst of the Canadian economic recession when it closed down in March 2010, terminating 61 jobs on a permanent basis. They once made fans and blowers for industrial operations in the region, but consolidated their manufacturing operations with parent company Canarm in Brockville. KAIN Logistics, formerly Lake Erie Warehousing, is currently located in the former Delhi Industries building; it provides industrial customers in Southern Ontario with logistics, trucking, and warehousing and storage services. 2600 people in Norfolk County have officially joined the workforce between June 2012 and June 2013. Local businesses have been slowly expanding again. Innovative ways to operate business ventures have indirectly improved the lives of workers who live in Delhi. The economy of the Greater Toronto Area, along with the rest of the world, may become further interconnected with the economy of Delhi.

As of 2017, there were eight medical doctors who practice conventional medicine within the town of Delhi. The local health clinic was built in the mid-2000s and continues to expand in order to attract more medical personnel.

== Sports ==
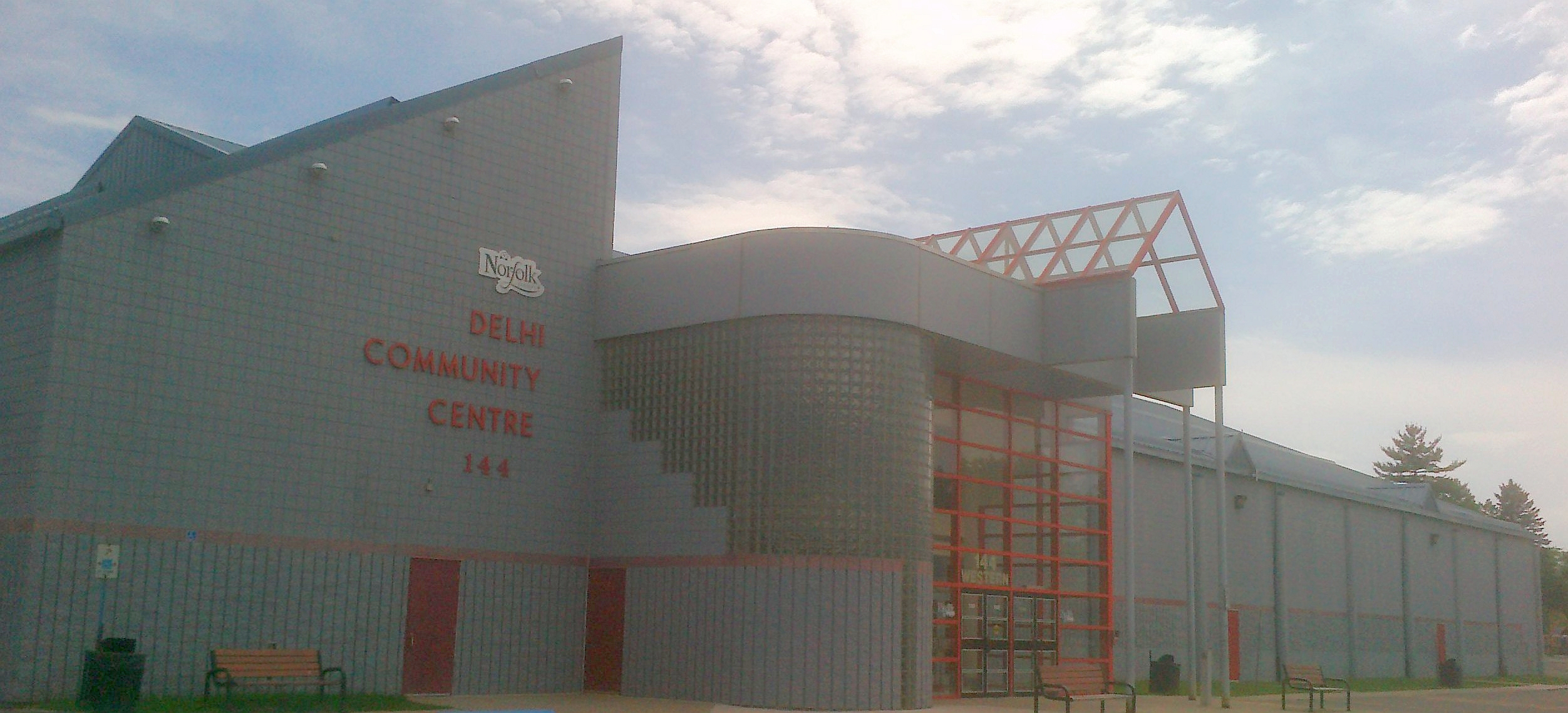
Delhi Community Centre

Delhi is home to the Delhi Travellers, a junior hockey team that plays in the Southern Ontario Junior Hockey League. They are also the home of various minor soccer, minor baseball, minor soccer, and minor hockey teams. Minor sports are played by young people between the ages of three (for the Initiation age group) and 20 (for the Juvenile age group) in this region. These events are played out either at or near the vicinity of the Delhi Community Arena.

North Creek was once the most important spawning point for the local fish species until it was dammed in 1965. Prior to the 1960s, local residents and avid fishermen alike would often stake out ideal fishing spots near the once-fertile tributaries. North Creek is used today as a means to provide a supplemental water supply to the municipally owned aquifers.

== Education ==
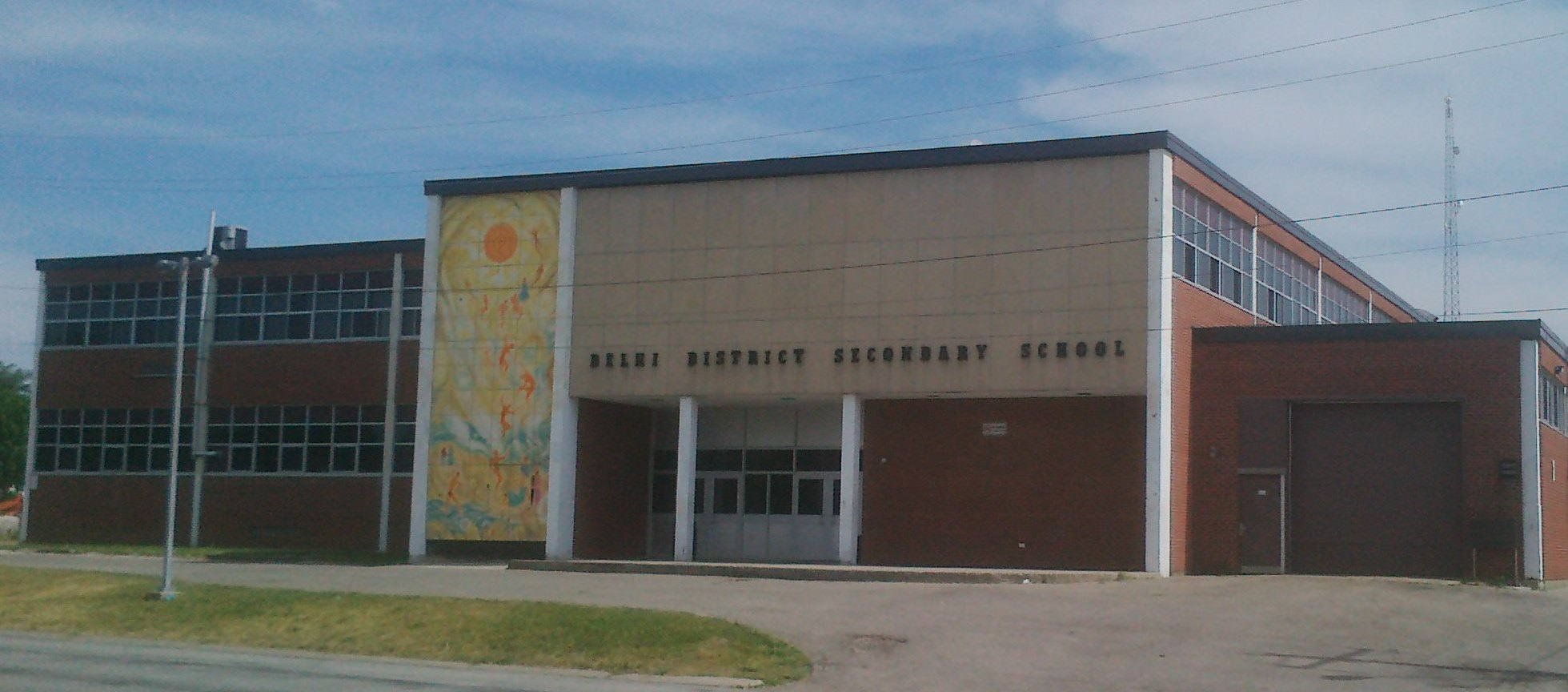
Delhi District Secondary School

The local high school, Delhi District Secondary School, has faced the threat of closure in the past, but the local school board has committed to keeping the school open for the indefinite future.

== Notable people ==
- Barry Boughner (1948- ), retired NHL player
- Earl Frederick Crabb (1899–1986), World War I flying ace
- John Leslie Hotson (1897–1992), scholar of Elizabethan literary puzzles
- John A. Schweitzer (1952-), artist, art critic, and philanthropist
- Ryan VandenBussche (1973-), retired NHL player raised in Delhi

== See also ==
- List of unincorporated communities in Ontario
