= Frogmore, Ontario =

Community of Norfolk County, Ontario, Canada

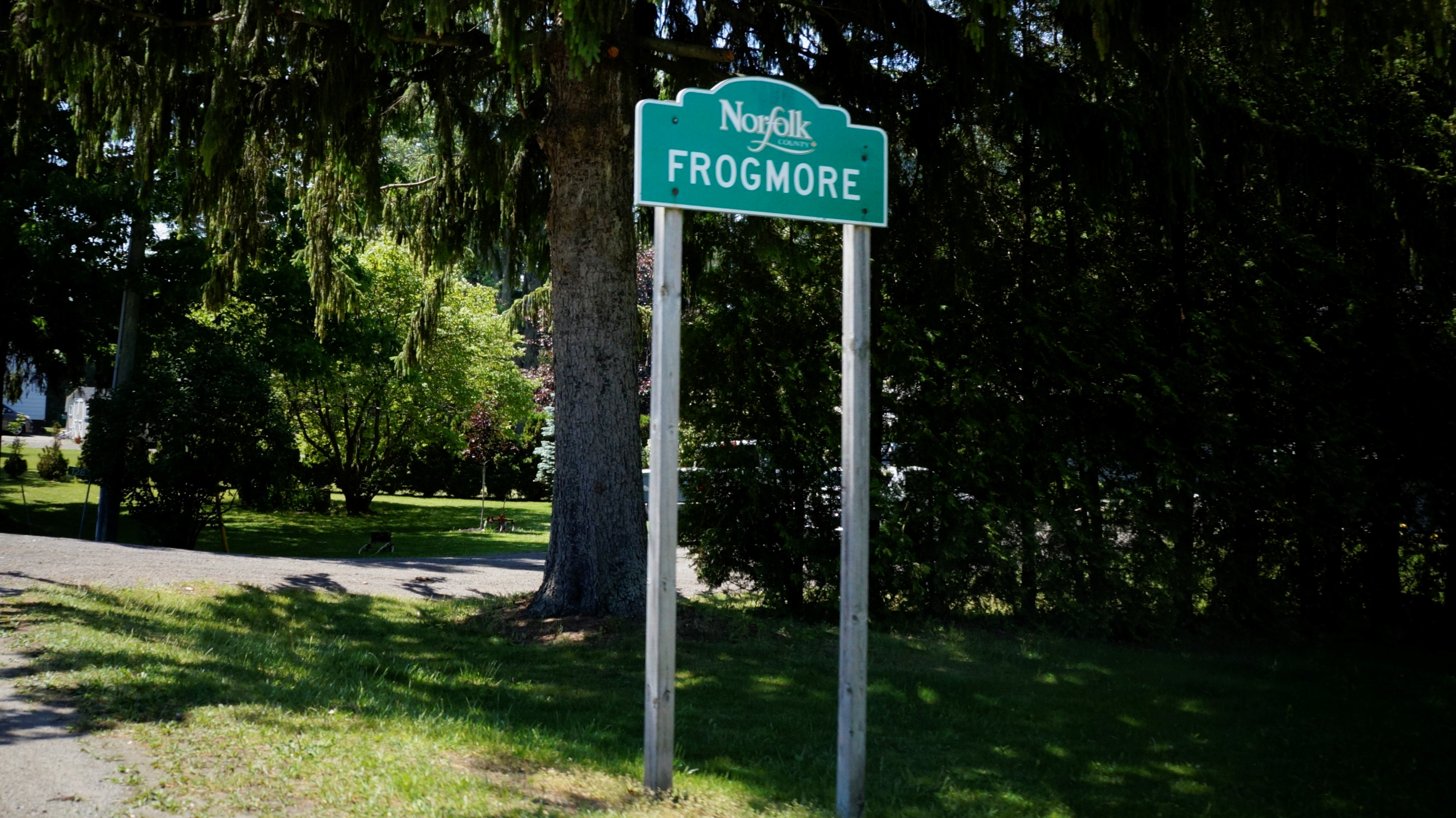
Welcome sign

Frogmore, Ontario is a small hamlet that is located northwest of Valley Heights Secondary School. Agriculture is the main industry and commerce is non-existent. There is a concrete products company and a church in the hamlet. It is one of the westernmost communities in Norfolk County, Ontario, Canada.

Frogmore's earliest known inhabitants, from around the year 1000 until approximately 300–350 years later, were the Algonquin nation. They were noted flint-workers and evidence of their skill in crafting arrowheads is still to be found in open worked field areas surrounding the village. The next wave of inhabitants were the Attawandaron nation, the Neutrals, who occupied the region from about 1350 until their absorption by the Iroquois in the year 1651. The last significant native nation to occupy the area was the Mississaugas.

In 2001, Haldimand-Norfolk was dissolved into two separate single-tier counties. Frogmore became part of the newly formed County of Norfolk.

== Summary ==
This community has approximately 147 people; a sizeable population of them are German Mennonites and Mexican Mennonites. Named in 1886 after one of Queen Victoria's residences in Hampshire, England.

Six wind turbines with a generation capacity of approximately 9 MW of electricity have been placed in the vicinity, about 7 kilometres to the south near the shore of Lake Erie. Norfolk County regional council passed a resolution to be an "unwilling host" to future wind turbine development in May 2013. Frogmore is not seeing notable population growth as people may choose to move to the larger nearby communities of Simcoe, Delhi, and Tillsonburg.

The popular tourist destination of Port Burwell is just a 30 minutes' drive to the southwest of this community. Another historic community, Sparta, along with the St. Thomas Raceway Park lies 45 minutes to the southwest from Frogmore.

=== Climate ===
The winter of 1975 was the only unusually mild winter in the region from 1897 to 1977. From the late 1990s onwards, winters have become more mild due to changes in climate brought on by global warming. Frogmore traditionally belongs to the humid continental climate zone, even with the recent mild winters and warmer dry summers. As in all communities, towns and cities throughout the world, global warming due to human industrial activity has altered the climate of Frogmore over the decades.
