= Haldimand County Museum & Archives =

Haldimand County Cayuga Heritage Centre
- Former name: Haldimand County Museum & Archives
- Location: Cayuga, Ontario, Canada
- Coordinates: 42.9495291°N 79.8582028°W
- Type: Heritage Museum
- Curator: Geneva Gillis
- Website: Haldimand County Heritage Centre

The Haldimand County Heritage Centre is located within the Cayuga Library and Heritage Centre at 19 Talbot St. W in Cayuga, Ontario. The museum and archives were previously housed in the Haldimand County Museum & Archives on Echo Street, Cayuga ON. Since 2019, the contents of the building have been relocated to the Cayuga Library and Heritage Centre. The Haldimand County Heritage Centre is a museum that preserves and makes accessible evidence of the history of Haldimand County including genealogy records, local newspapers, maps, census information and more. Artifacts related to Haldimand County are restored and displayed in the museum galleries and grounds. The current curator is Geneva Gillis.

== Buildings, facilities, and exhibits ==
The museum houses one gallery featuring a rotating exhibit.

The archives research facility provides access to collections relevant to historians and genealogists interested in the county. The archives hold a large collection of genealogy records for families with a history in Haldimand County. In addition, the Heritage Centre collects local newspapers and census records and stores them on microfilm, some dating back as far as 1853. Special events are held throughout the year.

== Publications ==
The museum has published histories on specific aspects of county life, including:

- Armstrong, Bonnie. Architecture of Haldimand County. Cayuga, Ontario: Haldimand County Museum, 1983.
- Bacher, Christine, Christine Boyko, Holly Csorbay, Joelle Dosman. Folk Art of Haldimand County. Edited by Rene Tunney. Cayuga, Ontario: Haldimand County Museum, 1985.
- Tunney, Rene. Cabinet Makers of Haldimand County: An Introduction and Inventory. Cayuga, Ontario: Haldimand County Museum, 1984.

== Related ==
The Haldimand County Museum & Archives is one of three heritage facilities operated by the Heritage and Culture Division of the municipal government, Haldimand County. The other two are the Edinburgh Square Heritage and Cultural Centre and the Wilson MacDonald Memorial School Museum.

Ruthven Park National Historic Site (a National Historic Site of Canada) is located approximately 4 kilometres north of the Haldimand County Heritage Centre and another national historic site, Chiefswood, is located within the county boundaries, but on the Six Nations Reserve approximately 25 kilometres to the northwest. There are also privately operated cultural centres in the county: Cottonwood Mansion (Selkirk, ON), No. 6 RCAF Dunnville Museum (Dunnville, Ontario), Caledonia Grand Trunk Station and the Caledonia Mill. The annual Caledonia Fair also exhibits historical artifacts and tableaux of early agrarian and industrial life in the county.

== Affiliations ==
The Museum is affiliated with: CMA, CHIN, and Virtual Museum of Canada.
