= McKinnon Park Secondary School =

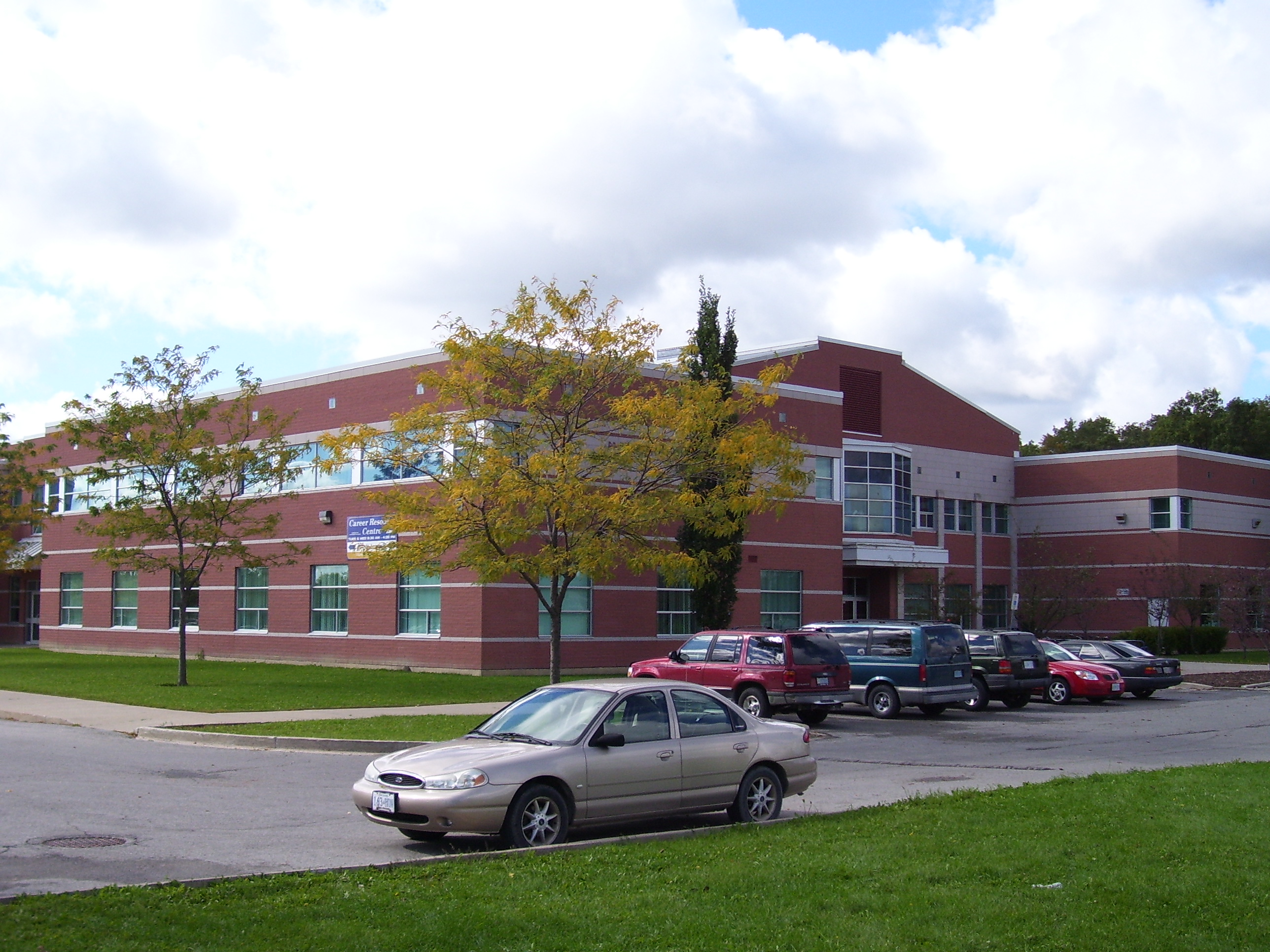
- A picture of the school in the fall.

Location
- 91 Haddington Street; Caledonia, Haldimand County, Ontario, N3W 2H2; Canada; 43.063476°N 79.954022°W

Information
- School type: Public, high school
- Motto: Tradition with Change
- Established: September 1992
- Status: Active
- Locale: Caledonia, Ontario
- School board: Grand Erie District School Board
- Principal: Robert Malcolm
- Vice Principal: Adriana Potichnyj
- Staff: 58
- Teaching staff: 41
- Grades: 9-12
- Gender: Co-Ed
- Enrollment: 700+ (January 2023)
- Language: English
- Area: Caledonia, Ontario
- Campus type: Suburb
- Colours: Royal Blue & Gold
- Mascot: Blue Devil
- Team name: Blue Devils
- Rivals: Cayuga Secondary School & Hagersville Secondary School
- Feeder schools: Caledonia Centennial Public School, River Heights Public School, Oneida Central Public School
- Website: granderie.ca/schools/mpss

McKinnon Park Secondary School is a high school in the town of Caledonia, Ontario. It replaced Caledonia High School for the school year 1992/1993, which was converted into River Heights Public School. It temporarily served as a home to the new population of River Heights Public School in fall 1991 while renovations and an expansion were created. It is home to the SHSM (Specialist High Schools Major) program offering red seals (upon completion of the requirements) at graduation in hospitality, green industries, and construction.

The 2022/2023 academic year saw over 700 students enrolled. The school is home to the largest Indigenous student body in the Grand Erie School District, at 29% or 260 students as of 2018/19. Most of these students come from the nearby Six Nations of the Grand River. Due to the large number of Indigenous students attending the school, classes such as Cayuga language, native history, and native arts are offered.

== See also ==
- Education in Ontario
- List of secondary schools in Ontario
