= Oasis Drive-In =

Coordinates: 43.0707°N 79.9532°W

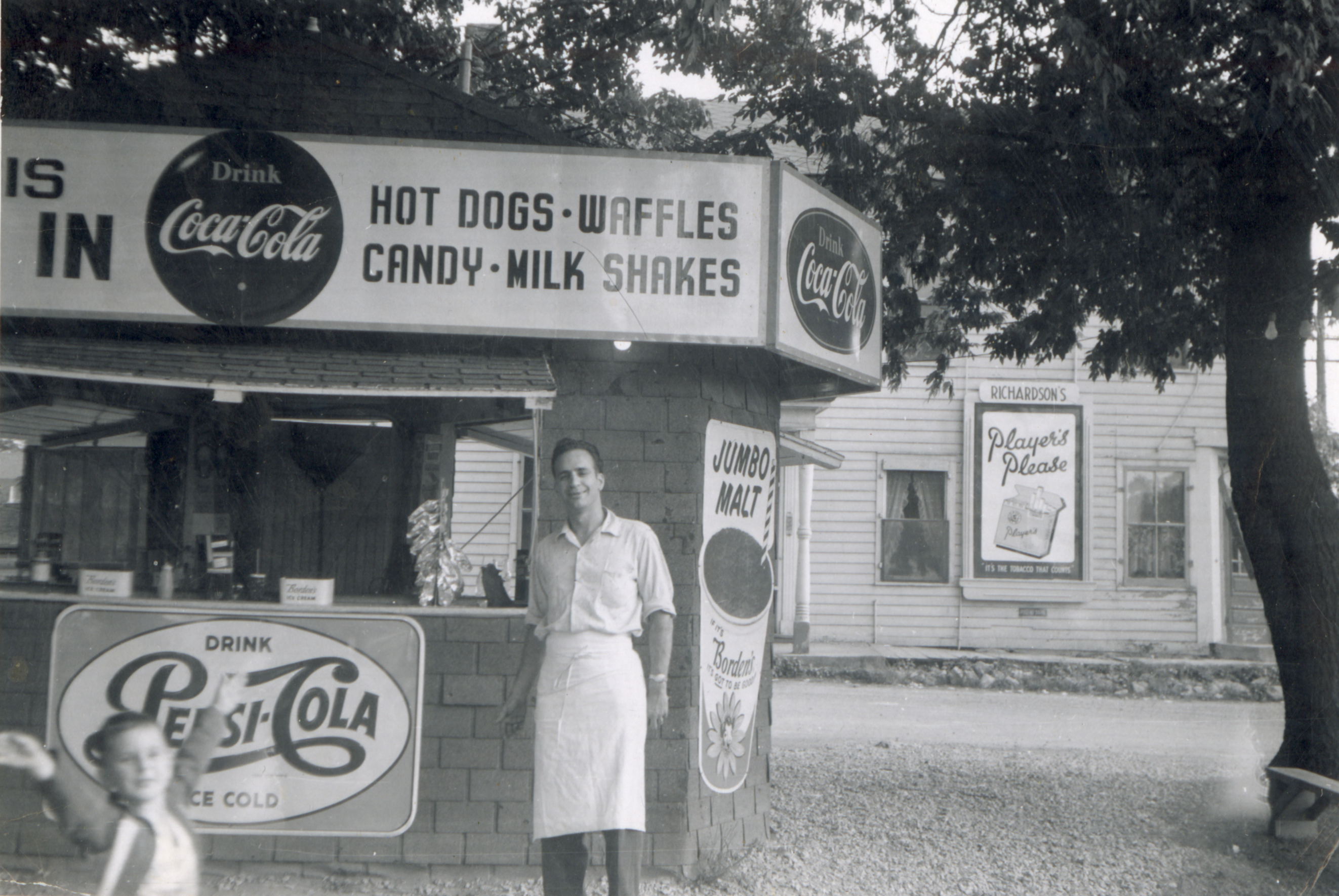
- The Oasis In 1956. Louis Leousis Standing In Front.
- Interactive map of Oasis Drive-In

Restaurant information
- Established: 1927
- Owner: Chris Leousis
- Food type: Canadian
- Dress code: Casual
- Location: 22 1/2 Argyle Street South, Caledonia, Haldimand County, Ontario, Canada
- Reservations: Not required

The Oasis Drive-In is a restaurant located in Caledonia, Ontario Canada, at 22 1/2 Argyle Street South. It opened in 1927 and is considered to be Ontario's and likely Canada's oldest Drive-In restaurant. The restaurant is open seasonally from April to November on an annual basis. This is how the restaurant has been operating since it opened in 1927.

== History ==
It all started in 1836 when James Little, an Irish immigrant to Canada, bought up vast tracts of land on the south side of the Grand River. Little did so when he heard about the possibility of a plank road and bridge crossing the Grand at Caledonia.

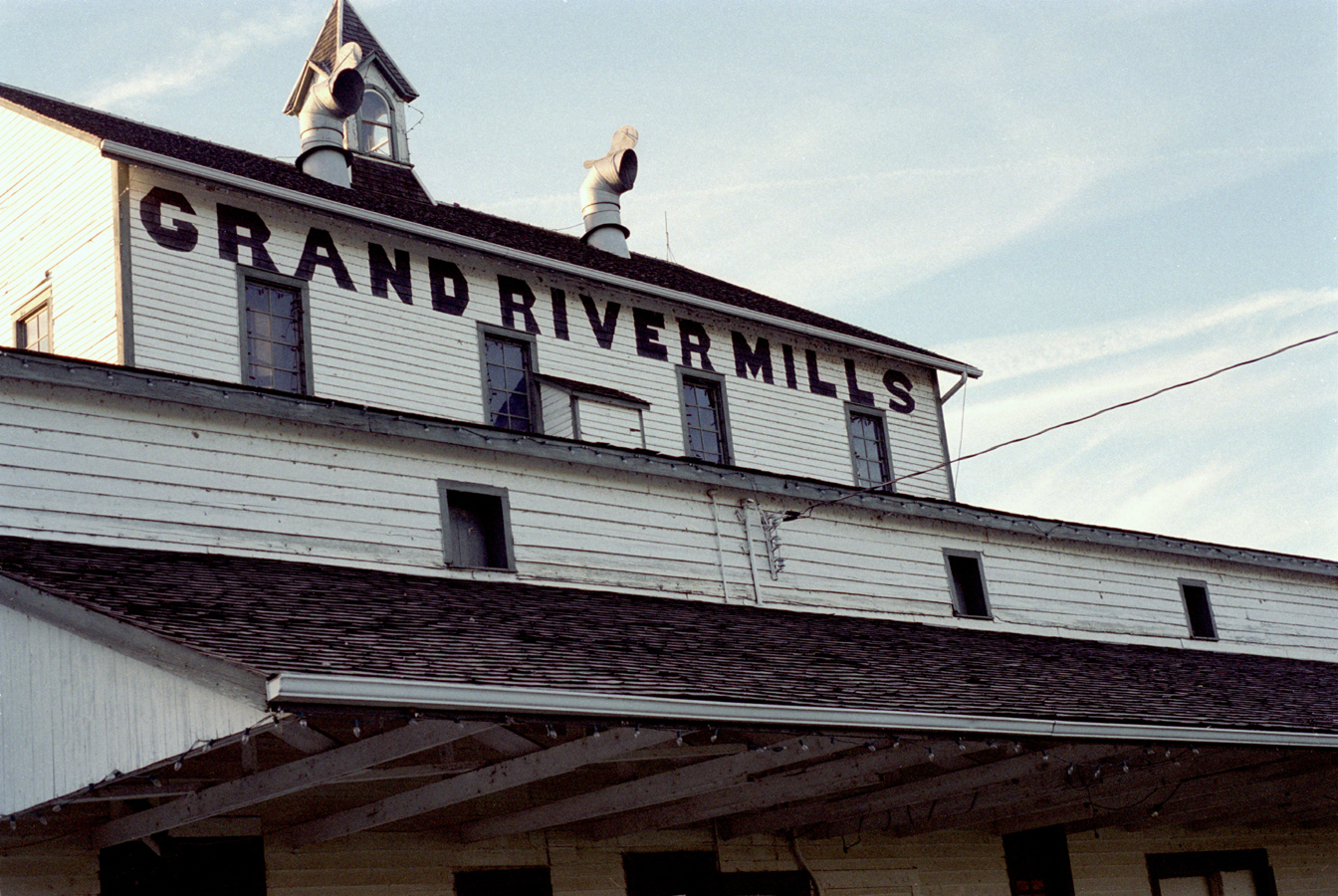
James Little also built The Caledonia Mill

The first building he built on these undeveloped properties was a timber-frame structure which he called Haldimand House, after Sir Frederick Haldimand. By 1842, Haldimand House was a busy stagecoach inn and tavern. For many years it was one of the largest buildings in the County of Haldimand, and at three stories it kept that designation until the early 1850s when the Caledonia Opera House was built on the corners of Argyle St. N. and Caithness St. E.

Little sold the inn to the Sutherland family who owned it for a few years. They sold to Bridget Britton, who leased part of the inn to William Lyon Mackenzie who used it as his campaign office during the Haldimand Bi-election of 1851. Britton sold the thriving inn to James Hayes who added the insignia Haldimand House J'As Hayes to the front of the building.

In 1900, the estate of Hayes sold the inn and attached lands to Matthew Richardson. When business started to decline, Matthew called on his son Walter to come down from Toronto and open a pool room in the old hotel. They soon realized that running an inn was too expensive, and so the Richardsons surrendered the license for a stagecoach inn, and instead started a new business venture. In 1927, Walter Richardson built and opened Cone Cottage Refreshments in front of Haldimand House. The Richardsons' business took off, selling foot-long hot dogs, home made sandwiches, ice cold Coca-Cola soft drinks and ice cream. At that time the hot dogs were cooked inside the old hotel so a bell and line system was installed. Walter would ring out the number of foot-long hot dogs that were needed and Mrs. Caroline Richardson would send the cooked food down to the restaurant.

The Richardsons' first customers were the workers that were building Canada's first and only 9-span bridge across the Grand River at Caledonia, a replacement for the bridge which had collapsed in 1925. After the death of Walter Richardson, Cone Cottage went up for sale. In 1956, it was purchased by newlyweds Louis and Beatrice "Bea" Leousis, Bea a local girl whose family owned The Caledonia Restaurant (located next to the Opera House), and Lou whose family owned a restaurant in Toronto. The couple added fresh cut French fries, and many other items still on the menu today.

Weeks after opening, the Leousis' changed the name to The Oasis Drive-In after looking out over the Grand River on a hot summer day.

== Today's Oasis ==
In 1991, Louis' son Chris purchased the business and added several new low calorie/carb items to the classic menu, and the success of the business grew. Today, the menu remains relatively unchanged, and many of the Richardson family and Leousis family recipes are still used when creating food. All menu items are made fresh to order.

The Oasis slogan from the early 1990s was This Is No Mirage!, which appeared on a billboard sign on Haldimand Highway #6 North coming into Caledonia from Hagersville.

In 1993, Chris Leousis opened Haldimand House as Haldimand House Gift Shoppe, Beanery & Café. The Café section closed in 2006, and the focus of the gift shoppe is now Antiques.

In 2014, the Caledonia Candy Co. (est. 1936) was revived by Leousis' daughter Alex.
