= Southern Ontario Transit =

Former Public Transit Operator

Overview
- Locale: Haldimand County
- Transit type: Bus service
- Number of lines: 1
- Line number: 100
- Website: https://sotransit.ca/

Operation
- Began operation: September 2024
- Ended operation: December 2024

Southern Ontario Transit (SOT) was a public transit system in Ontario, Canada that connected communities in Haldimand County to Hamilton in Southern Ontario.

== Route ==
It operated a single route, the 100, which connected Downtown Hamilton, passing through Mount Hope and the airport, Caledonia, Hagersville, Cayuga, then to Dunnville, where it terminated.

== Fares ==
A one-way intercity fare was $10 cash, $11 e-pay, with local fares set at half that price.

== History ==
Operation began on the 16th of September, 2024, with weekday service with three round trips per day using a 10-seater van.

Southern Ontario Transit was founded by Rae Rivard and his wife, but due to both financial and low ridership, the agency was forced to permanently suspend its only route.

The route was suspended on the 16th of December 2024, with it only running for three months after launch before ending.
