= Caledonia High School =

Caledonia High School may refer to any of these institutions of secondary education:

- Caledonia High School (Rosyth), Scotland
- Caledonia High School (Minnesota), USA
- Caledonia High School (Michigan), USA
- Caledonia High School (Ontario), Canada
