= Caledonia Mill =

Historic mill building in Caledonia, Ontario, Canada

Coordinates: 43.0718°N 79.9586°W

Caledonia Mill / Grand River Mills
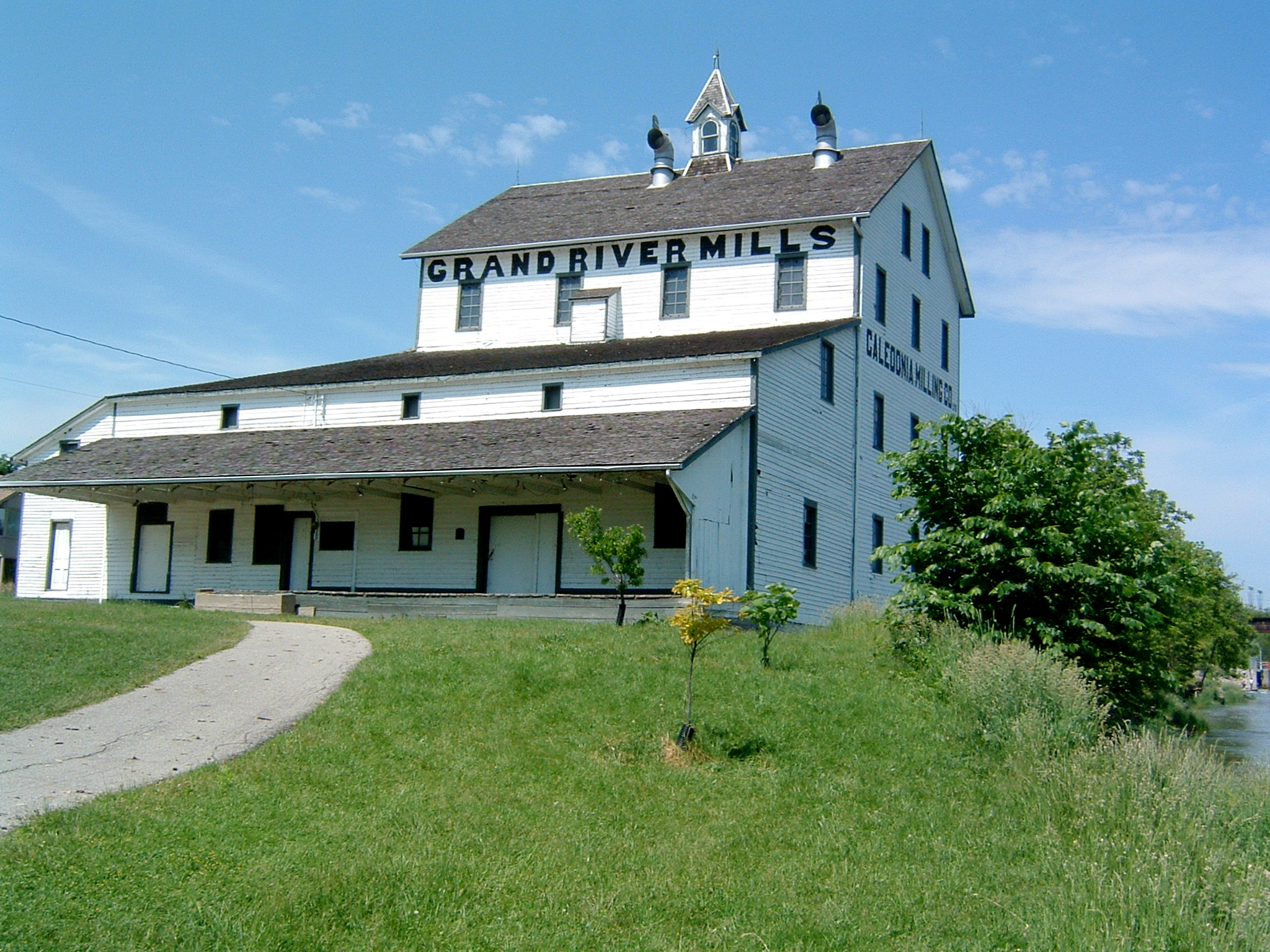
- Caledonia Mill in 2006

Flour / grist / feed & seed
- Location: 146 Forfar Street West, Caledonia, Ontario, Canada
- Client: The Caledonia Milling Co. Ltd.

Construction
- Completed: c. 1846
- Floor count: 4

The Caledonia Mill was a historic mill building located in Caledonia, Ontario, Canada. Built in 1846, it was a heritage property under the Ontario Heritage Act. It was the last timber-frame water-powered mill along the Grand River in Ontario. In 2018, the mill was dismantled by Riverside Properties and rebuilt as an office complex.

== Location ==
The Caledonia Mill was located on the banks of the Canadian Heritage Grand River, in Caledonia, Ontario, Canada.

== History ==
The Old Mill is thought to have been built c. 1846. From then until 1892, the flour milling industry in Caledonia appears to have been a significant business, though it faced competition from across the river and financial difficulties. By 1850, Caledonia founder Ranald McKinnon's milling enterprises on the Northside comprised a sawmill, flour mill, and woollen mill. This Northside mill area was within the Village of Oneida, while James Little's Southside mill was within the Village of Sunnyside. (Note: Thompson, Ian. "Over 160 Years of History at Caledonia's Old Mill". Legends & Lore (Caledonia History). Creepy Caledonia.)

McKinnon's mills suffered repeatedly from fire and flood. His sawmill, damaged many times by ice and shifted off its location by the 1861 flood, lasted until it burned in January 1942. The 1844 flour mill was rebuilt twice following fires in 1862 and 1876 and stood until September 6, 1969, when it was destroyed by fire. The 1848 woollen mill burned and was rebuilt in 1863, but it was not rebuilt after being destroyed in an alleged arson in 1881, two years after McKinnon's death. The Southside mill escaped fire and flood and survived for more than 150 years.

The flour mills were reportedly the site of a large milling business in the 1860s and 70s. Until then, the two flour mills were presumably either rented or managed for Little and McKinnon. Daniel McQuarrie was in partnership with McKinnon in the Northside mill from 1865 to 1869. After this partnership ended, McQuarrie and James Thorburn bought the Southside mill, known as Balmoral Mills, and renamed it Grand River Mills.

In 1873, William Munro joined McQuarrie and Thorburn to buy out McKinnon's flour milling business. This gave the trio control of the flour milling business in Caledonia. The fire of 1876, which required the Northside mill to be rebuilt, did not halt their business. The partnership was said to be the largest dealer in grain in the County of Haldimand.

The Caledonia Dam was registered to them under a "Bargain and Sale" from the Haldimand Navigation Company in 1875. The purchase and improvements cost CA$5,000 (equivalent to $171,793 in 2025), which allowed them to furnish water power to McKinnon's woollen mill and a plaster mill.

According to the Haldimand Atlas of 1877, they were producing 1500 barrels weekly and paying out half a million dollars in cash annually. Most of the flour was shipped to Montreal, from where it was sold in the lower provinces of Canada and in Europe. In 1877, they shipped 6000 barrels direct to Glasgow, Scotland. The business employed about 40 men. The owners sought to secure the establishment of another manufacturing business, to which they would furnish water power at a reasonable rate.

In 1880, however, the partners were declared bankrupt. The cost of rebuilding the Northside mill in 1876 may have contributed to their financial difficulties.

The Northside mill was taken over by Robert Shirra.

== Scott Brothers ==
William Scott, an employee of Grand River Mills and a younger brother-in-law of Munro, wanted flour milling to continue at the Southside mill. He formed a partnership called Scott Brothers, in which he was joined by his brothers Samuel and Hugh and his brother-in-law Simeon Hewitt, a lawyer from Brantford.

Samuel Scott and Simeon Hewitt are said to have been the financial principals. Robert Shirra paid $14,000 for an undivided half of the rights and privileges in the dam; Samuel Scott paid $9,800 for the other undivided half. An agreement of January 1880 stated that William and Hugh Scott, as one party, and Robert Shirra, as the other, would each be responsible for an undivided half of the dam, water and maintenance.

In February 1884, a declaration of trust named Samuel, William and Hugh Scott and Simeon Hewitt as owners in equal shares of Balmoral Mills, including a share in the dam.

Samuel Scott died in 1886, and William later became convinced that the mill might be better run under a different arrangement. Following successful examples at other milling establishments, he canvassed farmer friends and customers in the area around Caledonia, persuading them to invest in shares of a new milling firm. On February 16, 1892, the Caledonia Milling Company Limited received its provincial charter. In March 1892, a Bargain and Sale was recorded: "William Scot and wife and Hugh Scott and wife to The Caledonia Milling Co. Ltd. Supposed flouring mill and an undivided interest in Dam #5 – 2 acres, 2 roods, 9 perches." (A rood is a quarter of an acre, and a perch is a land measure of 5 and a half yards.)

== The Caledonia Milling Company Limited ==
The Caledonia Milling Company (Limited) received its charter on February 16, 1892, with capital stock of CA$25,000 (equivalent to $985,405 in 2025), divided into 500 shares of $50 each. Each shareholder was to pay 20% on or before the first day of December 1891, and the balance, at six percent per annum, was due within one year.

The new Caledonia Milling Company (Limited) was to take over the manufacturing and merchant milling business of the firm of Scott Brothers of the Town of Caledonia in the County of Haldimand. Farmers formed the joint stock company to purchase the business of what later became known as the Old Mill, along with all other businesses and property owned by Scott Brothers. William Scott was to manage the business for the company.

A provisional Board of Directors was set up to pay necessary preliminary and promotion expenses and then to pay Scott Brothers for the business and property within three years from the date of the incorporation. When one half of the stock was subscribed and 20% paid, application was made for the incorporation of The Caledonia Milling Company (Limited). The Provisional Board of Directors had to approve the subscriptions for stock.

According to the prospectus, the property, located partly in the town of Caledonia and partly in the Township of Oneida, consisted of a large, modern, recently refitted and improved roller mill known as "The Balmoral Mills" with about three acres of land; a one-half interest in the dam across the Grand River and all associated rights; two flour and feed stores, together with the lands on which they stood; and a large storage and shipping warehouse on the lands of the Grand Trunk Railway Company at the Caledonia Station.

According to the prospectus, the Balmoral Flouring Mill, formerly a four- run stone mill, had a modern improved system of patent rolls with a capacity of 100 barrels per day. The prospectus stated that its flour had a high reputation in the general markets and sold readily, and that its water power, rarely equalled in the province, would add to the profits of the business.

The Village Flour and Feed Store occupied part of lot number one on the west side of Argyle Street, at the corner of Caithness Street. The new milling company would own the entire building, which contained the head office and two other stores, as well as upper storeys that were to be rented out. It was said to be one of the most valuable properties in the town.

The other store, known as the Caledonia Flour and Feed Store, was on the east side of Wigton Street, on the second division of lot number 10, south side of Forfar Street, and was also said to be a valuable property and a good business.

The flour and feed stores also had storehouses capable of holding large quantities of grain. The storehouse on lands of the Grand Trunk Railway Company was under a ground lease from Grand Trunk, was connected to the railway by a switch, and had facilities for storing and shipping.

== Later history ==
The Caledonia Milling Company surrendered its charter in 1964. The mills and their adjoining properties were then sold to LH&J Enterprises, a company owned by three men. By the early 1970s, LH&J appears to have sold the north mill and was leasing the south mill to Jan and Leona Buta.

The north mill burned on September 6, 1969.

The south mill was later purchased by the Grand River Conservation Authority, which hoped to turn the site into a conservation area and park. In 1979, the authority planned to demolish the mill. A committee of the Golden Horseshoe Antique Society saved the mill from demolition by having it designated under the Ontario Heritage Act through the Haldimand County LACAC (Local Architectural Conservation Advisory Committee).

The Golden Horseshoe Mill Committee put up a new roof and repainted the mill building. In 1998, The Caledonia Old Mill Corporation was formed by community members to take over the restoration of the mill. In 2017, the Mill was sold for $1 to Riverside Properties, which demolished the structure and rebuilt it as an office complex.

== Construction (architecture) ==
=== Power ===
The Caledonia Mill was powered by three water turbines, one of which was significantly smaller than the others. Before the building's demolition, most of the lineshafting, which connected leather belts and pulleys to machinery, remained attached to the turbines, which were still in place.

=== Equipment ===
The mill retained a large amount of its machinery, as well as machinery transported from Apps Mill near Brantford, Ontario. Machinery on display in the mill prior to demolition included roller mills, a centrifugal flour dresser, a swing-sieve sifter, several bolting reels, separators, purifiers, and bucket elevator systems.

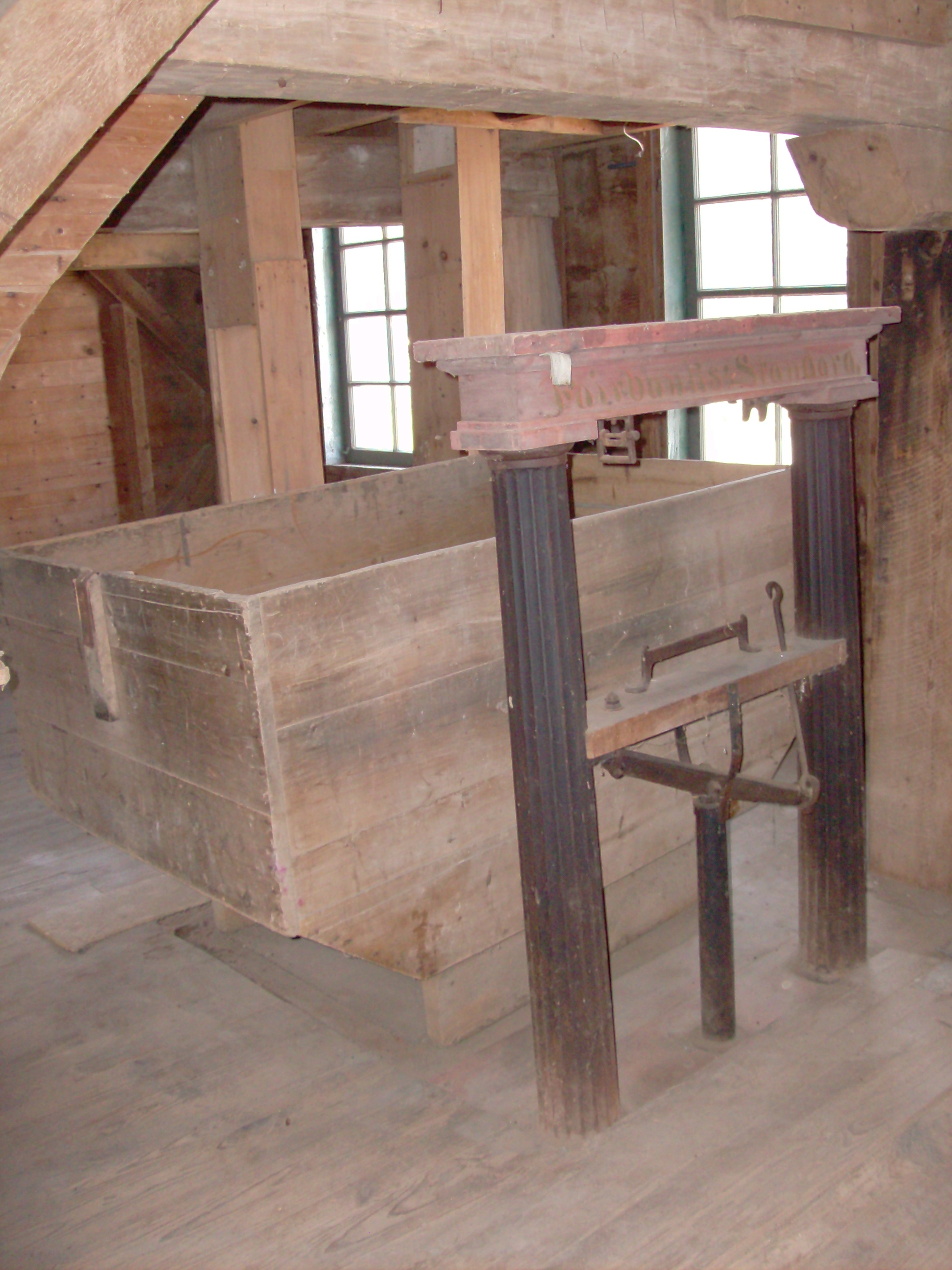
Inside Caledonia's Old Mill in 2011

=== Later extensions ===
There were two major additions to the Mill. The first occurred in the 1880s, when a two-story L-shaped addition was built. The second was a two-story annex added in the 1900s. The three sections together made up the mill as it stood before its demolition.

The Mill featured a cupola, a decorative feature rarely seen in Canadian mills of the era. The cupola gave a view of the Grand River Bridge, the only nine-span bridge in Canada. The cupola was likely used to allow light to shine on the lineshafting on the top floor of the building.

== Usage ==
The Mill building was demolished by Riverside Properties in 2018 and rebuilt as an office complex.

=== Owners ===
The land on which the Mill once stood is now owned by Riverside Properties. The river-front park is owned by Haldimand County, and the Millrace or Head race is owned by the Grand River Conservation Authority.

=== Tenants ===
For a short time in the 2000s, the Mill was used by the Grand Mill Theatre Company, which used the main floor as a performing arts space.

== Public access ==
In 2011, the mill was included in Doors Open Haldimand County. The river-front park is used by many organizations because of its location along the Grand River.

== Notable events ==
From 2008 to 2016, the Caledonia Mill was home to one of the largest winter light displays in Southern Ontario. The display, which ran each year from late November to early January, attracted thousands of visitors. A large number of holiday lights were synchronized to holiday music.

== See also ==
- Caledonia Dam
- Haldimand House

== Bibliography ==
- Martindale, Barbara (1995). Caledonia: Along the Grand River. Dandurn Press. p. 41. ISBN 0-920474-81-0.
- Thompson, Ian (2009). "Over 160 Years of History At Caledonia's Old Mill". Creepy Caledonia.
- Scott, Douglas (1998). Mills & Milling in Caledonia. Grand River Sachem.
- "Caledonia Old Mill Corporation". Caledonia Old Mill Corporation. 2009. Archived from the original on June 25, 2011.
- "Caledonia Old Mill To Be Dismantled". Grand River Sachem.
