= Rob Winger =

Ontario-born poet and educator

Rob Winger (born 1974) is an Ontario-born poet and educator. Winger grew up in Springvale, Ontario, and has lived in Toronto, Sackville, New Brunswick, South Korea, Bangkok, Thailand, Guelph, Ontario, and Ottawa, Ontario. Winger now lives with his family in Port Perry, Ontario. He has been an assistant professor in the Department of English at Trent University since 2013.

== Education ==
Winger received a Bachelor of Arts in English and fine arts from Mount Allison University in 1997, a Bachelor of Education from the University of Ottawa in 2001, a Master of Arts in English literature from the University of Guelph in 2002, and a Doctor of Philosophy from Carleton University in 2009. Winger was a postdoctoral fellow at McMaster University from 2011 to 2013.

== Works ==
Winger's first collection of poems about famed photographer Eadweard Muybridge, entitled Muybridge's Horse, won the 2003 CBC Literary Award for poetry. Published by Nightwood Editions in 2007, the final book, Muybridge's Horse: a poem in three phases, was nominated for the 2007 Governor General's Award, 2007 Trillium Book Award for Poetry, 2007 Ottawa Book Award, and was named a Globe and Mail Best Book for 2007. Selections from the book have been translated into Japanese by Motoyuki Shibata. Winger is also the recipient of several grants from the Ontario Arts Council and the Canada Council for the Arts. His second and third volumes of poems,The Chimney Stone (2010), which was written in conjunction with his doctoral thesis, and Old Hat (2014), were also published by Nightwood Editions. His fourth collection is It Doesn't Matter What We Meant (McClelland & Stewart, 2021).
