= Hickory Beach, Ontario =

Hickory Beach, Ontario may refer to:

- Hickory Beach, Kawartha Lakes, Ontario
- Hickory Beach, Haldimand County, Ontario
