= Grand River Dam =

Grand River Dam may refer to:

- Caledonia Dam in Ontario, Canada
- Pensacola Dam in Oklahoma, United States

== See also ==
- Grand River (disambiguation)
