= Caledonia Opera House =

- Interactive map of Caledonia Opera House
- Address: 40 Argyle St. N, Caledonia, ON N3W 1B6
- Location: Caledonia, Ontario, Canada
- Coordinates: 43.073863°N 79.951729°W
- Elevation: 212.1 metres (696 ft)
- Type: Opera House

Construction
- Built: 1830's
- Opened: 1830's
- Closed: 1947
- Rebuilt: 1950
- Years active: 1830-1947

The Caledonia Opera House was a three-storey building located in small town Caledonia from the 1830s until a fire which destroyed the building in 1947.

== 19th century ==
When Ranald McKinnon came to Caledonia in the 1830s there were very few buildings on what would become Caledonia's main street: Argyle Street. One of the few was a building known then as the Bryant Tavern, located on the corner of present-day Argyle Street North and Caithness Street East, where the Ye Old Squire is now located.

In the 1850s the Bryant Tavern became known as the Roper block as a druggist with the name Roper owned the building. During this time the building held a variety store, the Roper drug store, and several other small shops on the main level. The second floor was a large opera hall used and rented for the showing of theatre performances, in addition to chataqua shows and political rallies of the day. The top storey of the red-brick building was used as the lodge hall for the Caledonia Masonic Lodge.

== End of an era ==
In 1947 a fire started in the opera hall, which gutted the entire building and the stores located next to it, including the Caledonia Restaurant, owned by the Vlachos family (whose daughter would later become co-owner of Caledonia's Oasis Drive-In).

It was the end of an era, as Caledonia has not seen a permanent theatre facility since.

== Other theatre companies ==
Caledonia has had several other theatre companies in more recent times. Theatre Amicitia was operated in the St. Andrews Masonic Lodge Hall until the mid-2000s. Another company called Grand Mill Theatre operated as a committee of the Caledonia Old Mill Corporation until 2008.

In the 1900s Caledonia was also home to the Regency or Regent Theatre which showed motion picture films in a small building located on Caithness Street East, about where the Regency Apartments are now located. This Theatre closed in the late 1970s.
