= Grand River Bridge (Ontario) =

Caledonia Bridge
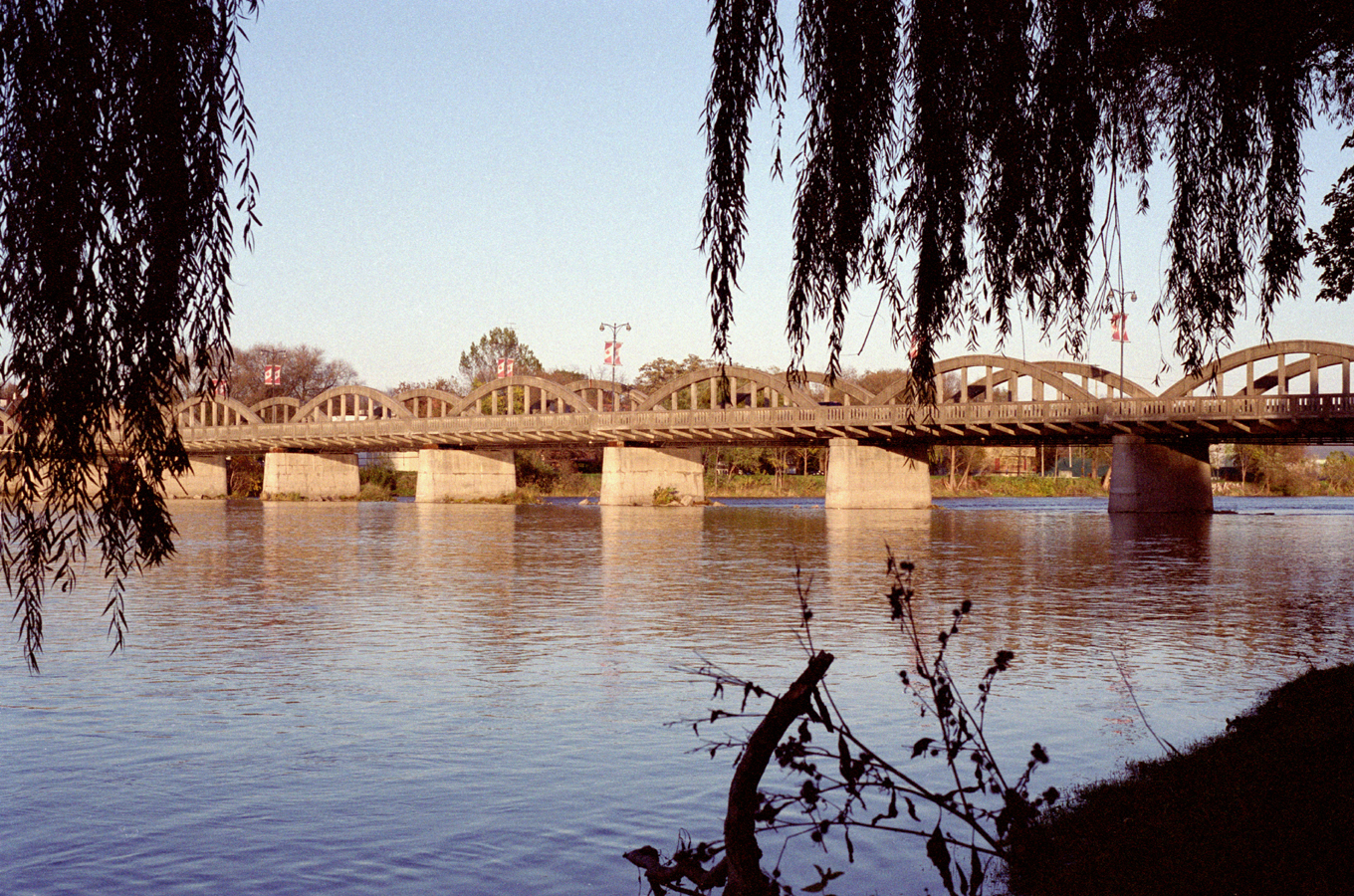
- The Caledonia Bridge.
- Coordinates: 43.072250°N 79.952456°W
- Carries: Traffic
- Crosses: Grand River
- Locale: Caledonia, Ontario
- Official name: Caledonia Bridge
- Heritage status: Canada Heritage Bridge
- Website: historicbridges.org/bridges/browser/?bridgebrowser=ontario%2Fcaledonia%2F
- Preceded by: Highway #6 By-pass
- Followed by: York Bridge

Characteristics
- Design: Bow String Arch Bridge
- Material: Steel Reinforced Concrete
- Total length: 700 feet (210 m)
- Width: 41 feet 8 inches (12.70 m)
- Traversable?: Yes (Note: Small craft can pass beneath the bridge.)
- No. of spans: 9
- Piers in water: 0
- Load limit: 8 tonnes
- No. of lanes: 2

History
- Constructed by: Department of Public Highways of Ontario
- Built: 1927
- Construction start: June 1927
- Construction end: November 1927
- Replaces: Caledonia Iron Bridge

Location
- Interactive map of Caledonia Bridge

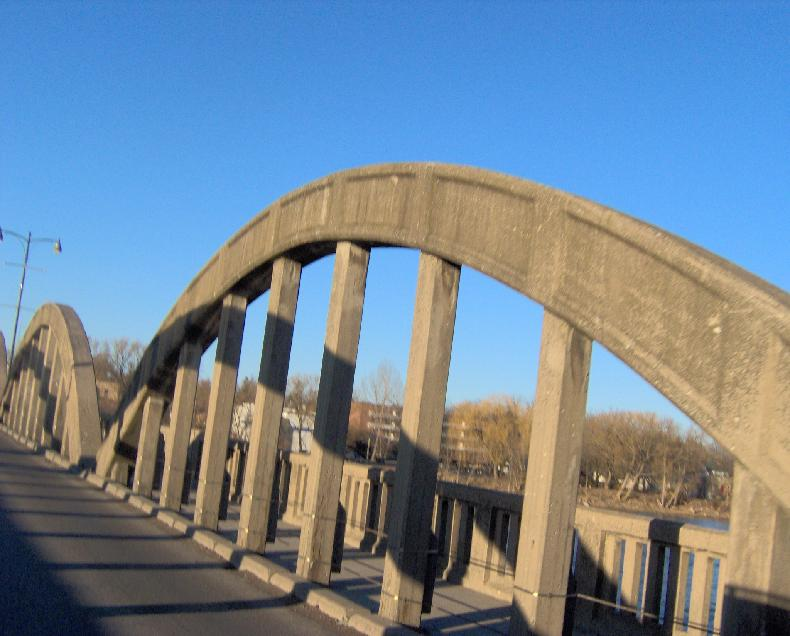
Detail of a span from the bridge deck

The Caledonia Bridge, also known as the Grand River Bridge (built 1927) is a road bridge located in Caledonia, Ontario, Canada on Argyle Street. The bridge is the only nine-span bridge of its kind in Canada and is considered the first reinforced concrete bridge of its type ever built.

The bridge is on the Ontario Heritage Bridge List and is designated by the Haldimand County LACAC (Local Architectural Conservation Advisory Committee).

The bridge is scheduled to be replaced by a new bridge due to structural damage and age. A number of bridge deficiencies were found requiring action. The condition included structural deficiencies, structural deterioration, insufficient roadside safety, foundation problems and inadequate hydraulics. The engineering consulting firm Morrison Hershfield was approached to conduct a Context Sensitive Design Workshop for the bridge. They involved stakeholders and representatives from the public to participate in the bridge design to address various environmental aspects of the project. Completion of the bridge was tentatively scheduled for 2012, but as of 2024, minimal work has been done towards its replacement.

== History ==
Before the construction of the first bridge, a series of ferries were arranged to transport people from the North to the South and vice versa. On March 6 of 1834, the proposal of a plank wood road stretching from Hamilton to Port Dover succeeded. The Hager brothers were brought into the area for construction of the original bridge, construction a wooden bridge with a swing section in 1842 and completing the project in 1843. This resulted in the building of two Caledonia landmarks; Haldimand House: A Stagecoach-Inn, and the first Caledonia Bridge. This first bridge was wooden, with no pedestrian sidewalk, with wooden walls on either side for protection.

Caledonia's Grand River Sachem reported the collapse of this bridge in 1861, stating that the "Spring Freshet" took out the bridge, damaged the Caledonia Dam and wiped away most of the Seneca Bridge. Two temporary bridges were constructed between 1861 and 1874. Many people returned to the ferrying system or even resorted to rowboats to cross the river during the 4 years it took to complete construction on the temporary bridge. The last temporary bridge was replaced by a new, state of the art, 5 span iron bridge in 1875 designed by Mr. A.J. Brown. The iron being formed at Scott's Foundry located on the eastern corner of Edinburgh Square and Caithness Street. The iron bridge had a wooden floor, a wooden wall on one side and one sidewalk, the wood being cut at Ranald McKinnon's sawmill. A toll house was also constructed on the north side of the bridge, to pay off the more than $22,000.00 debt the town had incurred building the bridge. During the 1900's, the town also ran power, gas and phone lines under the bridge. This bridge lasted until 1925 when a truck carrying a load of stone collapsed an entire span. A group of children were swimming underneath the bridge when the incident took place and the truck driver personally saved the lives of five or more children.

In 1926 Construction started on a new bridge. The bridge was to be nine-spans, the first of its type in Canada. built with iron-reinforced concrete the new bridge carried two lanes of traffic and had a pedestrian sidewalk on either side. The entire construction, including the destruction of the previous bridge, was completed in a total of 140 days and was completed by the department of public Highways of Ontario. Work began in June 1927 and completed in November of 1927. The bridge was completed with each span measuring 72 feet and 7 inches long, hand rails measuring 700 feet from end to end, a road of 23 feet in width and a 6 foot sidewalk on each side. Upon completion of the construction, a ribbon cutting ceremony was held along with a parade and political speeches in the Caledonia Opera House.

On May 20, 1980, four years before the town would open a by-pass around the town, they began work on bridge repairs simultaneously with repairs to the Caledonia Dam. Travel across the bridge was restricted to one lane from 8 a.m. until late in the afternoon during construction, causing excessive pile-ups on both highways 6 and 54 and sidewalks were restricted similarly. More extensive repairs were conducted in 1984 when construction of the by-pass was finished.

Talk of a new bridge largely began by 2003 while others began brainstorming plans to preserve the historic bridge. In 2007, the Caledonia Bridge was designated as a Canadian Heritage Bridge as the oldest bridge of its type. More major repairs were conducted on the bridge through the Summer and Fall a year later, this time the bridge only remained open for south-bound traffic.

The bridge has, in recent years, had a set of traffic lights installed at either end to ensure that no traffic is on the bridge at the same time as any fire engines due to growing concerns over the structural integrity. In addition, large transport vehicles have been prohibited from use of the bridge.

== Statistics ==
The bridge measures:

- Length: 700 feet (210 m)
  - Length of Arches: 72 feet 7 inches (22.12 m) each
- Width: 41 feet 8 inches (12.70 m)
  - Width of Roadway: 23 feet (7.0 m)
  - Width of Sidewalks: 6 feet (1.8 m) each
- Number of arches: 9
