= Wilson MacDonald Memorial School Museum =

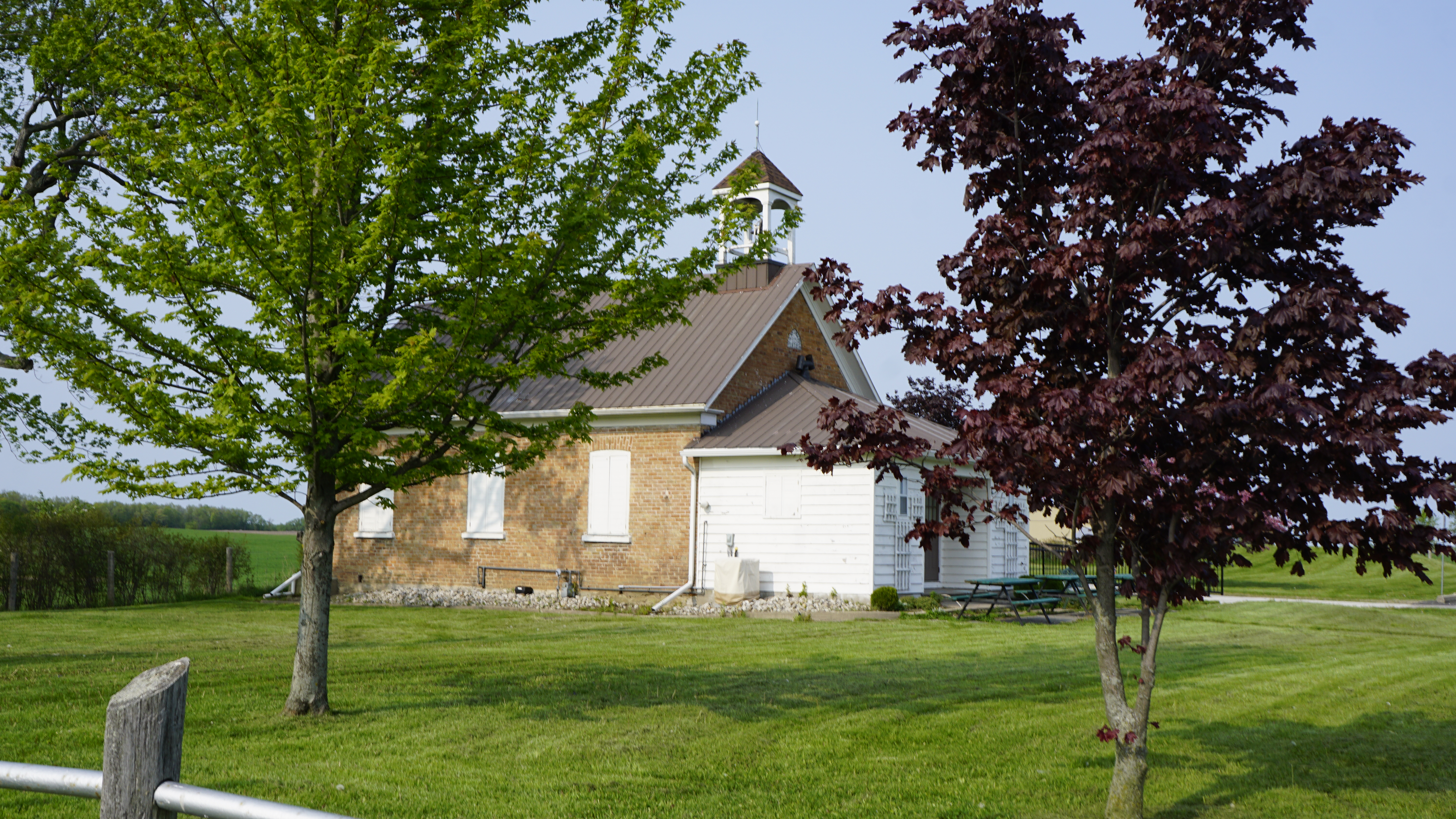
- Former name: Wilson Pugsley MacDonald Memorial School Museum
- Established: 1967
- Location: 3513 Rainham Rd., Selkirk, ON N0A 1P0
- Coordinates: 42.826941°N 79.975423°W
- Type: Heritage Museum & Tourist Information Centre
- Key holdings: Walpole S.S. No. 2, "McGaw's"
- Founders: Earl Sider & Elsie Sider
- Curator: Dana Stavinga
- Parking: On site (no charge)
- Website: haldimandcounty.ca/heritage-culture/wilson-macdonald-memorial-school-museum/

The Wilson MacDonald Memorial School Museum (WMMSM) is a museum dedicated to preserving the history of rural education in Haldimand County and Canada at large, the heritage of the surrounding community, and the memory of its namesake, Wilson Pugsley MacDonald.

== Collection, Exhibits and Events ==
WMMSM has a large collection of various artifacts relating to local heritage. The primary focus is on rural education however they hold a number of farming implements, type writers, medical tools, and more. WMMSM also has a number of photo albums featuring photos throughout the years of nearly every single one-room schoolhouse in the county.

The WMMSM houses four exhibits. There are 2 permanent galleries, one is an exhibit chronologically laying out much of Haldimand's and Canada's history with rural education and the second is dedicated to the museum's namesake, Wilson MacDonald. There is one rotating exhibit, changing roughly 3-4 times a year to keep the museum's contents fresh and in cooperation with Haldimand County's fellow museums, Haldimand County Heritage Centre and Edinburgh Square Heritage and Cultural Centre. The final exhibit is the preserved one-room school house, filled with artifacts from the time and area it was in use.

WMMSM runs a multitude of events for the local community including informational sessions, a car show, and a variety of workshops and summer camps.

== History ==
The schoolhouse was built in 1872, replacing the previous school house that had stood in the same property. It remained in use as a one-room school house until 1965 when it was shut down.

In 1967, through the efforts of Earl and Elsie Sider of Cheapside, Ontario, the schoolhouse was established as a museum. Much of the original articles that had once existed in the school house had been auctioned off however, many articles from the surrounding areas have since been donated back.

In the 1990s, an addition was built onto the east side of the building to include the current galleries, offices and other amenities.
