= Caledonia, Ontario =

Caledonia
- Unincorporated community
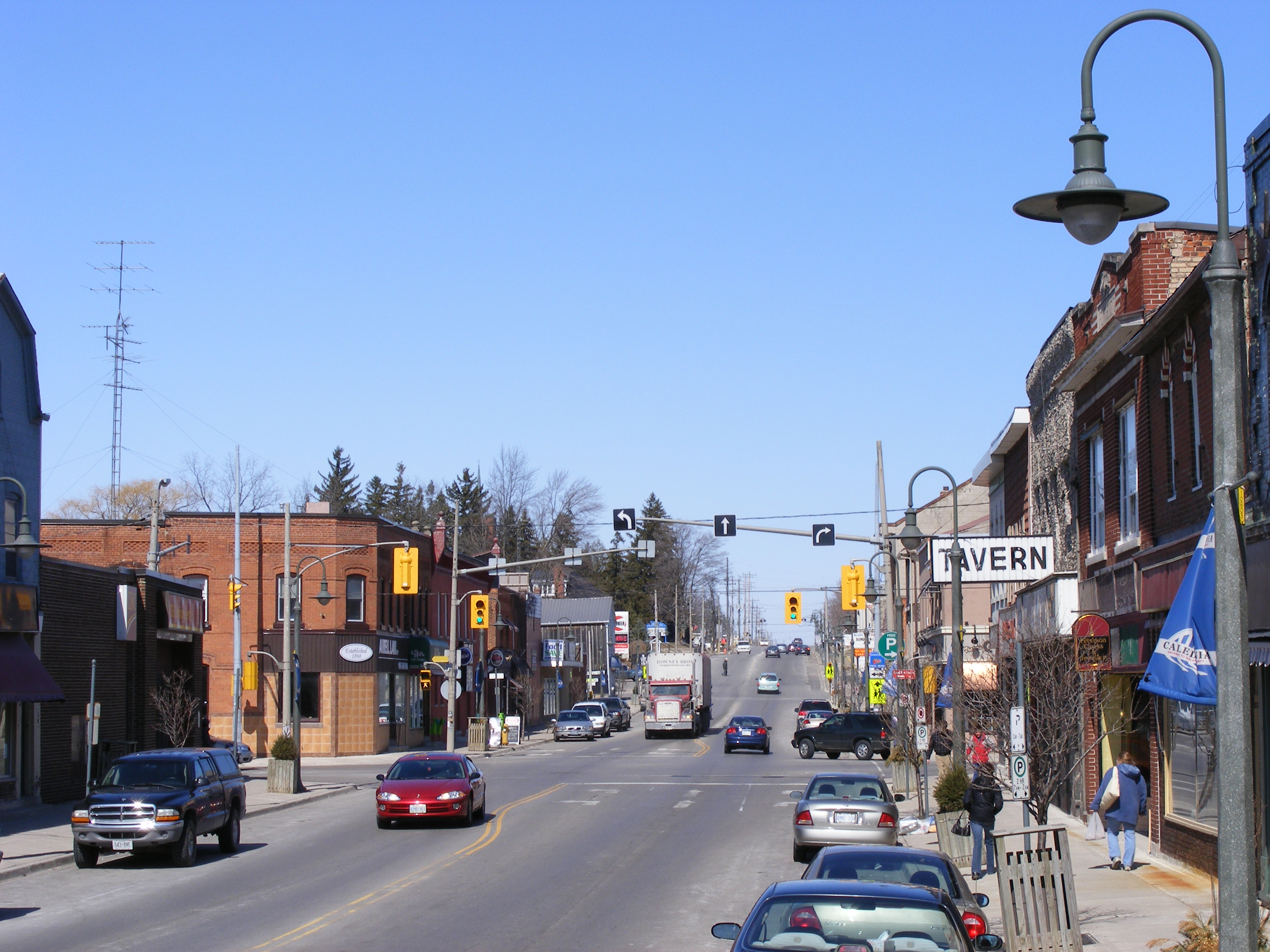
- Argyle Street
- Motto: Gateway to Haldimand County
- Location within Southern Ontario
- Coordinates: 43°03′53.1″N 79°57′18.3″W
- Country: Canada
- Province: Ontario
- County: Haldimand

Government
  - Mayor of Haldimand: Shelley Ann Bentley
  - Governing body: The Council of the Corporation of Haldimand County
  - Ward 3 (Caledonia) Councillor: Dan Lawrence
  - MP: Leslyn Lewis (Conservative)
  - MPP: Bobbi Ann Brady (Independent)

Area
  - Total: 5.57 km^{2} (2.15 sq mi)
- Elevation: 206 m (676 ft)

Population (2021)
  - Total: 12,179
  - Density: 2,190/km^{2} (5,660/sq mi)
- Demonym: Caledonian
- Time zone: UTC−05:00 (EST)
  - Summer (DST): UTC−04:00 (EDT)
- Forward sortation area: N3W
- Area code: 905 / 289 / 365

Caledonia is a community located on the Grand River in Haldimand County, Ontario, Canada. It had a population of 12,179 as of the 2021 Canadian Census. Caledonia is within Ward 3 of Haldimand County. The Councillor elected for Ward 3 is Dan Lawrence. As of 2021, there were 4,310 private dwellings in Caledonia.

Caledonia is located at the intersection of Highway 6 and Haldimand Highway 54 (within the town, these streets are called Argyle Street and Caithness Street respectively) on the Grand River.

== History ==
Caledonia was once a small strip of land between Seneca and Oneida villages. The Oneida village was started by the Grand River Navigation Company, which laid out the village of Oneida on the south side of the Grand River. The Oneida village plot originally contained 16 acres and was named after the township where it began. In 1835, the same company started the village of Seneca about a mile down the river from Oneida on the opposite side of the Grand River. It was named "Seneca Village" after the township in which it began. The Grand River passed through Caledonia, dividing it into two sides, North and South. In 1834, Ranald McKinnon was hired by the Grand River Navigation Company to build a dam in Seneca and a dam in Caledonia. Completed in 1835, the dams made water power available with the accompanying lock, and excavation finished early in the following year. Mills sprung up all over Seneca village, and five mills were built in Caledonia by 1850. One was renamed Caledonia Mill, which has been rebuilt and is now used for office space.

In 1835, William Bryant was the first to own a tavern in town. Official deeds to the lands early settlers occupied were not provided until 1850; however, they did have bills of sale. There was a high concentration of Scottish immigrants, and as such, many of Caledonia's streets are named in honour of this. Most notably, the main street is named "Argyle" after the example of Glasgow in Scotland.

The Hamilton to Port Dover plank road was brought through Caledonia in 1838. A bridge was built across the river in Caledonia and Seneca in 1842. When first constructed, a stagecoach travelled to both Hamilton and Port Dover daily. These wooden bridges lasted around 19 years before the ice on the river swept them away. The Seneca Bridge was never rebuilt. As of 2011, the Grand River Bridge built in 1927 serves Caledonia's traffic.

In 1846, David Thompson of Ruthven became the first Member of Parliament for Haldimand County and died in office five years later in 1851. In the succeeding by-election, Ranald McKinnon ran for office but was ultimately defeated by William Lyon MacKenzie. In 1853, Caledonia was incorporated as a village, when the villages of Oneida and Seneca were amalgamated, and later as a town. Ranald McKinnon was the village's first Reeve.

By 1860, the Grand River Navigation Company was bankrupt, and their land was sold to different organizations. Seneca village was failing; many people from Seneca moved to Caledonia, and navigation on the river ended by 1880. A new way of transportation arrived around 1883; the Grand Trunk Railway passed through Caledonia. Oneida had become part of Caledonia, and the town limits were expanding.

In 1875 the Caledonia Dam was sold to milling companies in the area from the Haldimand Navigation company however several of those companies fell into hard times after a series of fires leveled many buildings in the area. McQuarry, Thorburn and Monroe went bankrupt by 1880, and the Caledonia Mill was taken over by Robert Shirra, which remained active until 1960.

A high school was built in 1924, remaining in use until 1991, when McKinnon Park Secondary School was constructed. It currently houses River Heights Public School. In 1927, the Grand River Bridge was built, unique as the only nine-span bridge of its kind in Canada and the first reinforced concrete bridge of its type ever constructed. During these years, the town also saw the opening of an Opera House and the construction of St. Paul's Anglican Church.

James Little, the founder of Haldimand House, ensured that the ongoing railroad project was routed through Caledonia instead of Cayuga and heavily influenced the town into bankrupting itself to ensure it happened. He became director of the line in 1873. The wooden railway bridge, a local landmark, spanned the Grand River and opened on September 22, 1873, allowing railway travel from Hamilton to Jarvis and later to Port Dover. A 'Railway Hotel' was built where the current train station sits, and after a series of detrimental fires, the current train station was opened on September 30, 1908. As new technology made the train station rather obsolete, it fell into a sad state of disrepair. It was only restored in November 1997 after a businessman, Ron Clark, saved the property.

In 2006, the Grand River land dispute involving First Nation land claims brought Caledonia to national attention. The land at the centre of the dispute in Caledonia covers 40 hectares, which Henco Industries Ltd. planned to develop as a residential subdivision to be known as the Douglas Creek Estates. It is part of the 385,000-hectare plot of land originally known as the "Haldimand Tract", which was granted, in 1784, by the Crown to the Six Nations of the Grand River, for their use in settlement. Henco argues that the Six Nations surrendered their rights to the land in 1841, and Henco later purchased it from the Crown. The Six Nations, however, maintain that their title to the land was never relinquished. The Grand River land dispute continued with 1492 Land Back Lane, protests occurring during 2020 and 2021.

=== Ranald McKinnon ===
McKinnon was born in Ardelum, Scotland, on September 11, 1801. He came to Masonville, New York with his paternal grandparents, Malcolm McKinnon, his wife and a number of siblings. He worked in Virginia and Kentucky until 1820, when the family moved to Trafalgar, Esquesing and Vaughan. At 24, he began working on the Rideau Canal System. On March 3, 1835, he married his first cousin, Euphemia McKinnon, who was 22 years old at the time. The pair would go on to have nine children.

McKinnon was very involved in the community. He was the Treasurer of the Presbyterian Church for a time. In 1850 he petitioned that Caledonia be made its own township that would be absorbed into the county of Wentworth but nothing came of this. He ran for Haldimand County's member of parliament as a conservative when the predecessor died in office in 1851 but lost the election. He became Caledonia's first Reeve shortly after in 1853.

After several financial setbacks due to numerous of his business ventures burning down, McKinnon found himself in hard times. One of the last acts of his life was about 1875, when he attempted to have a steel bridge replace the pre-existing wooden one. Ranald McKinnon ("Town Father" of Caledonia) died October 18, 1879, at age 79.

== Demographics ==
Canada census – Caledonia community profile

	2021	2016
Population	12,179 (+23.9% from 2016)	9,674 (-2.0% from 2011)
Land area	9.18 km^{2} (3.54 sq mi)	5.57 km^{2} (2.15 sq mi)
Population density	1,326.7/km^{2} (3,436/sq mi)	1,738.2/km^{2} (4,502/sq mi)
Median age	37.2 (M: 37.4, F: 38.8)	40.5 (M: 39.2, F: 41.5)
Private dwellings	4,310 (total)	3,485 (total)
Median household income	$110,000	$96,614

References: 2021 2016

Census	Population
1841	300
1871	1,246
1901	801
1911	952
1921	1,223
1931	1,396
1941	1,401
1951	1,681
1961	2,198
1971	3,183
1981	N/A
1991	N/A
2001	9,228
2006	9,740
2011	9,871
2016	9,674
2021	12,179

=== Ethnicity ===
Only those populations which compose more than 1% of the population have been included.

Ethnic Groups in the Community of Caledonia, Ontario (2021)
Ethnic Group	2021		2016	
Ethnic Group	Pop.	%	Pop.	%
Canadian	1,935	15.89%	3,380	27.75%
English	3,325	27.3%	3,455	28.37%
Irish	2,345	19.25%	2,105	17.28%
Scottish	2,830	23.24%	2,785	28.79%
French (Note: Statistic includes all individuals that identified as having a French origin but not otherwise specified.)	650	5.34%	865	8.94%
German	1,620	13.3%	1,380	14.27%
Chinese	125	1.03%	70	0.72%
Italian	725	5.95%	565	5.84%
Indian	165	1.35%	45	0.47%
Ukrainian	445	3.65%	350	3.62%
Dutch	970	7.96%	980	10.13%
Polish	495	4.06%	370	3.82%
Filipino	135	1.11%	45	0.47%
Welsh	205	1.68%	180	1.86%
Portuguese	260	2.13%	120	1.24%
American	145	1.19%	75	0.78%
Hungarian	235	1.93%	255	2.64%
Pakistani	175	1.44%	10	1.81%
Jamaican	140	1.15%	25	0.26%
Croatian	125	1.03%	40	0.41%
Total responses	12,085	99.23%	9,560	98.82%
Total population	12,179	100%	9,674	100%
Note: Totals greater than 100% due to multiple origin responses.

=== Language ===
As of the 2021 census, 11,510 citizens spoke English only, 10 spoke only French, 595 spoke both official languages, and 60 spoke neither.

=== Religion ===
As of the 2021 census, 6,725 citizens were identified as Christian, 405 people identified as Muslim and 4,695 as non-religious and secular perspectives.

Religious buildings in Caledonia include:

- Gateway Church
- St. Paul's Anglican Church
- Caledonia Presbyterian Church
- Caledonia Congregational Church
- Grace United Church
- St. Patrick's Catholic Church
- Caledonia Baptist Church

== Government ==
The first Reeve of the village of Caledonia was Ranald McKinnon in 1853, and the town hall finished construction in 1858.

On April 1, 1974, the town was amalgamated into the new town of Haldimand within the Regional Municipality of Haldimand-Norfolk. Although the largest community in Haldimand, the town hall was located in nearby Cayuga. In 2001, Haldimand and all other municipalities within the region were dissolved, and the region was instead divided into two single-tier municipalities with city status but called counties. Caledonia is now an unincorporated community in Ward 3 of Haldimand County.

The current mayor of Haldimand County is Shelly Ann Bentley, and the elected councillor for Ward 3 (Caledonia) is Dan Lawrence.

== Education ==
Public education in Caledonia is administered by the Grand Erie District School Board and the Catholic schools by the Brant Haldimand Norfolk Catholic District School Board. Schools located in Caledonia include:

- Caledonia Centennial Public School
- Oneida Central Public School
- River Heights Public School (Note: River Heights currently hosts a French immersion program.)

Students eligible to attend secondary school in Caledonia have two significant options. They can attend McKinnon Park Secondary School within the town or take a bus to the neighbouring Cayuga Secondary School.

=== Catholic Education ===
- Notre Dame Catholic School
- St. Patrick's Catholic School

Students eligible to attend secondary school in Caledonia have only one option if they are seeking a Catholic education: Assumption College School in Brantford, Ontario. Students who choose this option are bussed to Brantford each day.

== Attractions ==
- Haldimand County Caledonia Centre
  - Caledonia Public Library

=== Heritage ===
- Edinburgh Square Heritage and Cultural Centre
- Grand River Bridge
- Grand River Dam
- Haldimand House
  - Oasis Drive-In
- Grand Trunk Railway Station
- Caledonia Toll House
- Caledonia Mill (Note: The Caledonia Mill was dismantled in 2018 and rebuilt as an office complex.)
- Caledonia Opera House (Note: The Caledonia Opera House burned down in 1947 and was never rebuilt, the site is currently housing a restaurant.)

=== Edinburgh Square (Old Caledonia Town Hall) ===
Previous to the town hall's construction, council meetings were held at the house of John Campbell (the local inn) and in other makeshift quarters. The first mention of a town hall was made in 1854 and was discussed for several months until over a year later the council decided to spend a "sum of Eight hundred pounds to build a Town Hall and public Lockup house." The town hall was built in 1857 and officially opened on January 18, 1858. At the time of its completion, John Scott was the Reeve of Caledonia, James Aldridge was the town clerk, and Thomas Belford was the constable and keeper.

Edinburgh Square was designed as a town hall with jail cells in the basement. The town hall was also intended to house a meat market in the basement. In addition, the second-floor hall was used for various purposes, from public events to Boy Scout meetings. In 1914 the library books had all been stored in the basement and the library was only reestablished in 1935 through the hard work of Laura and Harold Senn. When the library was reestablished, it remained within the town hall until the new Caledonia Public Library was opened in 1967.

The town hall was built by Mr. John Turner, a British immigrant who was residing in Brantford at the time. Mr. Turner also designed the courthouses in St. Thomas and Simcoe, St. Basil's Roman Catholic Church and Park Baptist Church in Brantford.

On January 25, 1982, the Town of Haldimand designated the Caledonia Town Hall as a heritage building. The building currently houses the Edinburgh Square Heritage and Culture Centre, a museum preserving the local area's history. The museum holds events throughout the year in partnership with the other county museums, Wilson MacDonald Memorial School Museum and Haldimand County Heritage Centre, in addition to summer camps.

=== Toll House ===
The Caledonia Toll House is the second oldest building in Caledonia, Ontario, still standing; the first being Haldimand House.

=== Parks ===
- Seneca Park
  - Rotary Riverside Trail
- Haller Heights Park
- Twin Heights Park
- Williamson Woods Park
- Haldimand County Ramsey Park
- McKinnon Park
- Kinsmen Park
  - Caledonia Lions Pool

=== Annual ===
- Caledonia Fair - Fourth weekend after Labour Day
- Light Up Night - Later Half of November
- Santa Claus Parade
- Yard Sale Day - First Saturday of June
- Canada Day Festival and Parade - July 1

==== Caledonia Fair ====
The Caledonia Fair takes place on the fourth weekend after Labour Day at the Caledonia Fair Grounds at 151 Caithness St. E., Caledonia, ON. At the Fair, one can find a collection of farm animals, local art pieces and cooking all on display. There are also several events during the duration, including a demolition derby, many magic shows and small concerts, rides for people of all ages, an event where local high schools compete for school spirit called 'High School Challenge', Touch-a-Truck, a display of classic cars, and more.

==== Light Up Night ====
The night, typically in the later half of November, is when the town's Christmas lights are turned on and celebrated in the Caledonia fair grounds where the children meet Santa Claus.

== Sports ==
=== Hockey ===
Caledonia Covaris game

The Caledonia Corvairs are a Canadian junior ice hockey team based in Caledonia, Ontario. They played in the Eastern Conference of the Greater Ontario Hockey League in 2023 but ultimately lost the final game against Hamilton 4 to 0. They became a Junior B team when the Brantford Eagles were transplanted, renamed and replaced the original Caledonia Corvairs (1961–2012).

All hockey activities take place in the Haldimand County Caledonia Centre. It is primarily used for the local minor hockey league, Caledonia Thunder, public skates and for the Caledonia Corvairs.

=== Soccer ===
Located opposite the Avalon development at 62 McClung Rd is the Caledonia Soccer Complex where the local Haldimand Soccer Club operates its youth soccer programs.

=== Baseball ===
There are two public baseball diamonds located in Caledonia, Ontario, that are not on school property. The first is located within kinsmen park, next to the Caledonia Lions Pool. The second is located next to the local hockey arena, the Haldimand County Caledonia Centre.

There is also a park featuring six baseball diamonds at 161 Greens Road, Caledonia, ON called Henning Park.

=== Basketball ===
There is a public basketball court located in McKinnon Park next to the Caledonia Skate Park. Additionally, the Haldimand Huskies Basketball Club, operates using the McKinnon Park Secondary School gym. The Haldimand Huskies have house league and skills development programs and also play at the rep level in the Ontario Basketball League. The Huskies have had Ontario Cup Championship teams in the boys divisions in 2023 (U19, U17, U15), 2024 (U19, U14), 2025 (U15, U16), 2026 (16).

=== Rugby Union ===
Caledonia Rugby Football Club, Caledonia RFC, is a rugby club with multiple 'minis' teams ranging from U6 to U12 divisions. The club operates as a satellite club, playing the union variant of rugby football, for the Norfolk Harvesters RFC using the McKinnon Park Secondary School playing fields.

=== Skateboard & BMX ===
A public skate park is located within McKinnon Park across the street from McKinnon Park Secondary School.

=== Tennis ===
Public tennis courts are located within the Caledonia Kinsmen Park.

=== Golf ===
The only place for golf in Caledonia is the MontHill Golf & Country Club, which replaced the previous Hagan farm. It currently features 3, 9-hole courses for a total of 27 holes of varying difficulties and can be found at 4925 Highway 6, Caledonia, ON.

=== Gymnastics ===
Caledonia & Grand River Gymmise Gymnastics & Trampoline Club, locally referred to as 'Gymmies,' is the only facility operating in Caledonia that offers a suitable environment for gymnastics. It can be found behind the Haldimand County Caledonia Centre at 10 Kinross Street, Caledonia, ON.

== Cemeteries ==
Cemeteries in Caledonia include:

- Caledonia Cemetery
- Saint Patrick's Cemetery
- Caledonia Methodist Cemetery
- Saint Paul's Anglican Cemetery

== Notable people ==
- Birthplace of Byron Edmund Walker (1848–1924), banker and patron of the arts
- William Winegard (1924–2019), educator and politician
- Birthplace of Isaac Kragten (2002–), actor
- Dr. Arnold T. Anderson, worked on the Manhattan Project; was educated at Caledonia High School

=== Sports ===
- Birthplace of Andrew Campbell (1988–), former defenseman for the Toronto Maple Leafs
- Birthplace of Cam Talbot (1987–), goaltender for the Detroit Red Wings
- Roy Edwards (1937–1999), former NHL player
- Birthplace of Jack Hamilton (1886–1976), ice hockey and multi-sport executive

== See also ==
- List of unincorporated communities in Ontario
- Communities of Haldimand County
- Haldimand County
- Grand River
- Six Nations of the Grand River
