= Springvale, Ontario =

Community in Ontario, Canada

Coordinates: 42.972°N 80.119°W

Location of Springvale in Ontario

Springvale is a community in the Canadian province of Ontario, located in Haldimand County. It is located approximately 6 km west of Hagersville, near the lands of the Mississaugas of the Credit First Nation.
