= Caledonia Centennial Public School =

Elementary school in Ontario, Canada

Location
- 110 Shetland Street; Caledonia, ON, N3W 2H1; Canada
- Coordinates: 43.07801°N 79.953432°W

Information
- School type: Public, elementary school
- School board: Grand Erie District School Board
- School number: 075604
- Principal: Colleen Kelly
- Grades: JK-8
- Enrollment: (2004)
- Language: English
- Area: Haldimand County
- Colours: Gold and Royal Blue
- Mascot: Spirit the blue cougar
- Team name: Blue Cougars
- Website: schools.gedsb.net/cal/

The Caledonia Centennial Public School is an elementary school located in Caledonia, Ontario, Canada, North of the Grand River on 110 Shetland St. The school teaches grades Junior Kindergarten to 8. The current principal is Colleen Kelly. The school mascot is the Cougar. The school colours worn by its sports teams are gold and blue. Start and finish times are 8:40 a.m. and 3:00 p.m. respectively. French Immersion is available for grades JK–4 with plans of becoming a dual track French immersion and English school by 2019.

The school was built in 1967, the Canadian Centennial (hence the name). The current school replaced the smaller schoolhouse where the Caledonia Presbyterian Church currently stands. Centennial is currently part of the Grand Erie District School Board. The school has three floors and a gym/stage. The school now has many portables outside as classes as the school has begun to overflow. The school is not equipped with an elevator but recently received a wheelchair walkway to the entrance.

== Recent history ==
In the mid-nineties to 2000s, the school had two tire playgrounds (one climbing and another for running on), a slide beside the building, a playground, and swings by the church. The slide was taken away likely because teachers could not see it easily, both tire equipment were burnt down by arsonists and the swings were taken away for likely the same reasons as the slide. However, a misleading box of stones was built closer to the school but no swings were ever put in.

Two Tetherball games were introduced but as of mid-2006. Two Four Square games were also made and are used every recess. The baseball field is also accessible. Twin soccer fields are used almost daily. There are 4 sand pits for track and field and two basketball courts. The playground consists of 2 slides, a fire pole, monkey bars, and a tic tac-toe game.

The wooden deck that remained from the original slide has since been paved over and fenced in. There are pizza days, fundraisers, spirit days, etc. Planned by Student's Council Members (students) of the school. There is one dance a year planned by the school (Valentine's Day) but also many afterschool dances planned by a local daycare (Cypress) and one Meet the Teacher night.

The school and its School Council are currently fundraising to install a new state-of-the-art playground and with the anticipated influx of new students due to a 3500-home subdivision being built in the area, portables have been added to the school.
