= Caledonia High School (Ontario) =

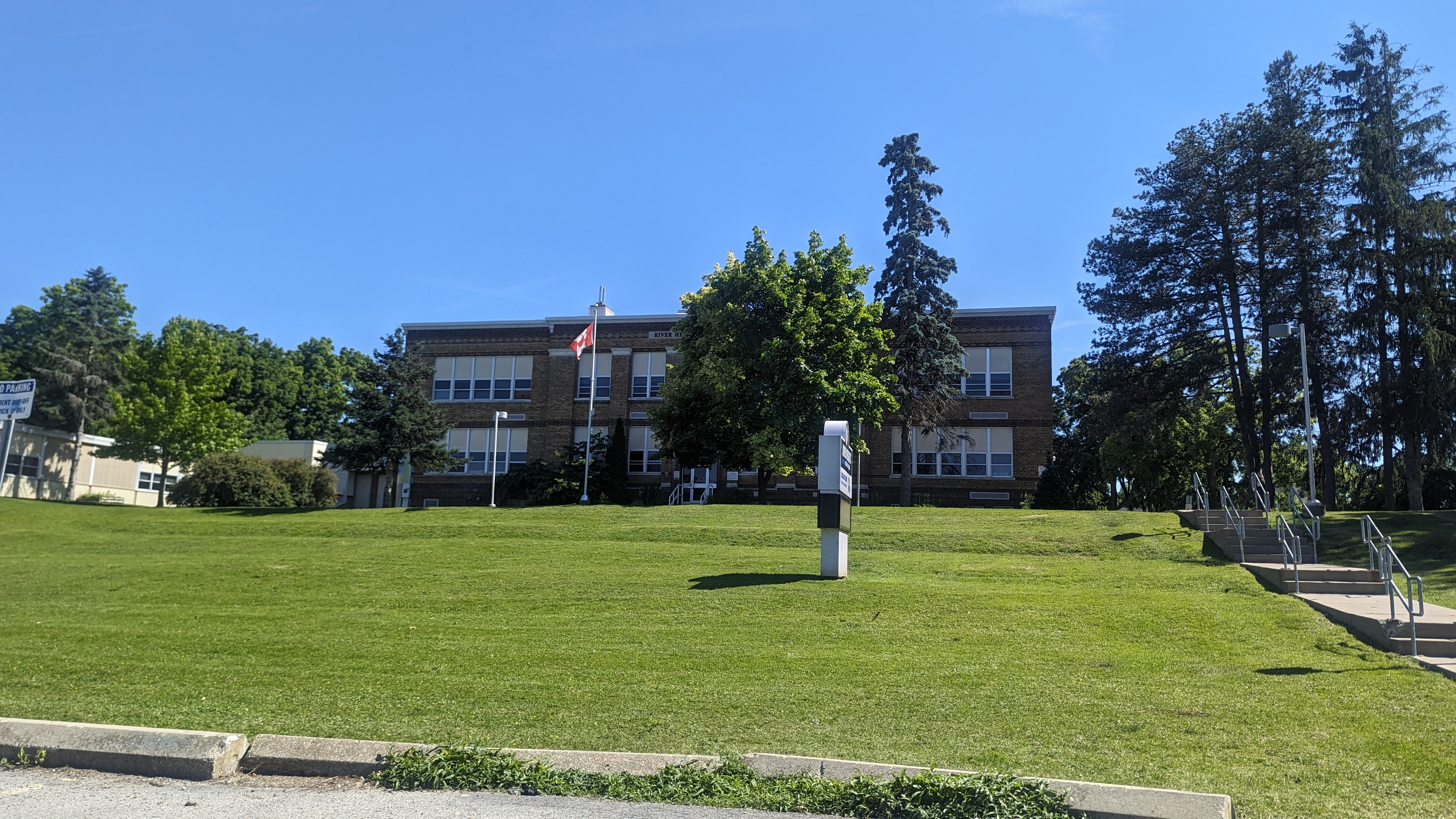

Location
- 37 Forfar St. E Caledonia, Ontario, NOA 1A0; Canada; 43°04′12.93″N 79°57′05.73″W

Information
- School type: Public High School
- Established: 1924
- Closed: 1992
- School district: Haldimand County
- Grades: 9–13
- Gender: Co-Ed
- Campus type: Rural
- Colors: Royal Blue and Gold
- Sports: Football, Gold, Tennis, Badminton, Field Hockey, Basketball, Volleyball, Lacrosse, Soccer, Track, Cross Country,
- Mascot: Blue Devil
- Team name: Blue Devils
- Rival: Cayuga Warriors and Hagersville Hurricanes
- Yearbook: Devilogue

Caledonia High School (CHS) was a public high school located in Caledonia, Ontario. It was built in 1924, overlooking the Grand River. Before CHS was established, high school students attended the old Caledonia Public School, which was once located behind the Caledonia Presbyterian Church. The school's mascot was the "Blue Devil," and its colors were blue and gold.
