= Haldimand County =

City in Ontario, Canada

- City (single-tier)
- Haldimand County
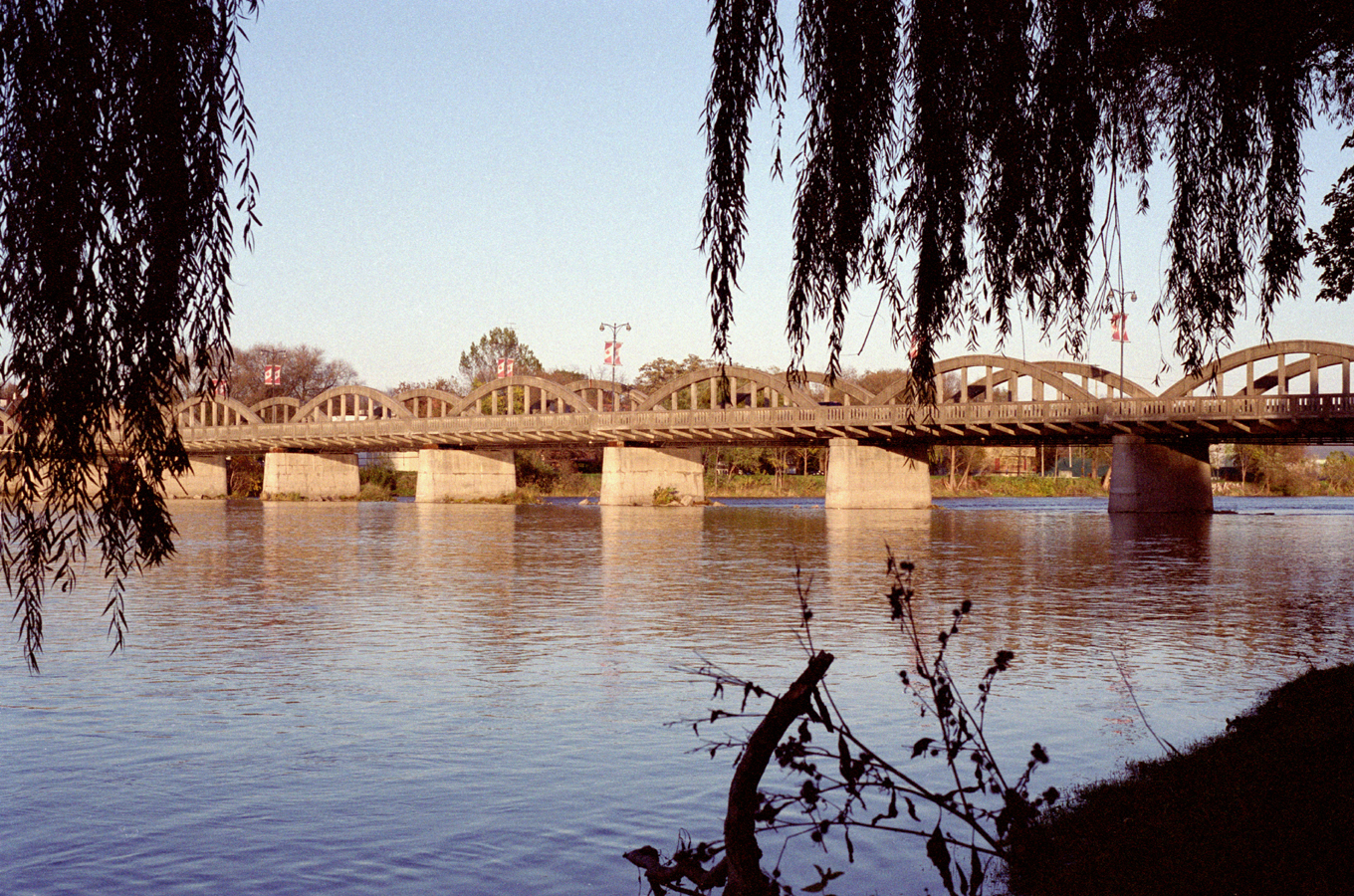
- The Grand River Bridge, which carries Argyle St. over the Grand River in Caledonia.

- Coordinates: 42°56′N 79°53′W
- Country: Canada
- Province: Ontario
- Incorporated: 1974 as a town by amalgamating villages of Cayuga, Hagersville and Caledonia and the townships of Oneida, Seneca, North Cayuga, South Cayuga as well as parts of Rainham and Walpole
- Enlarged: 2001 by amalgamating with Dunnville and half of Nanticoke

Government
  - Mayor: Shelley Ann Bentley
  - Governing Body: The Corporation of Haldimand County Council
  - MPs: Leslyn Lewis
  - MPPs: Bobbi Ann Brady (Ind)

Area
  - Land: 1,250.45 km^{2} (482.80 sq mi)
- Elevation: 237.7 m (780 ft)

Population (2021)
  - Total: 49,216
  - Density: 39.4/km^{2} (102/sq mi)
- Time zone: UTC-5 (EST)
  - Summer (DST): UTC-4 (EDT)
- Postal code span: N0A, N1A, N3W
- Area codes: 519, 226, 905, 289, 365
- Website: haldimandcounty.ca

Haldimand County is a rural city-status single-tier municipality on the Niagara Peninsula in Southern Ontario, Canada, on the north shore of Lake Erie, and on the Grand River. Despite its name, it is no longer a county by definition, as all municipal services are handled by a single level of government. Municipal offices are located in Cayuga.

The county is adjacent to Norfolk County, the County of Brant, the City of Hamilton, the townships of West Lincoln and Wainfleet, and the Six Nations reserve.

== History ==
Haldimand's history has been closely associated with that of neighbouring Norfolk County. Upper Canada was created in 1791 by being separated from the old Province of Quebec, Haldimand was created in 1798 as part of the Niagara District. It was named after Sir Frederick Haldimand, the governor of the Province of Quebec from 1778 to 1785. In 1844, the land was surrendered by the Six Nations to the Crown in an agreement that was signed by the vast majority of Chiefs in the Haldimand tract. In 1974, Haldimand was incorporated as a town by the amalgamation of the villages of Cayuga, Hagersville and Caledonia and the townships of Oneida, Seneca, North Cayuga, South Cayuga and parts of Rainham and Walpole. In 2001, Haldimand was enlarged by amalgamating with Dunnville and half of Nanticoke.

Beginning in February 2006, a land dispute by native protesters began near Caledonia over a housing development being built on the outskirts of town, which members of the nearby Mohawk Six Nations people claim is rightfully their land. The issue reignited again in February 2020, when Mohawk protesters blocked off Highway 6 again in protest of McKenzie Meadows.

== Communities ==
The population centres in Haldimand are Caledonia, Dunnville, Hagersville, Jarvis and Cayuga. Part of the Six Nations Reserve is within the geographic area of Haldimand County, but is independent of the county. Most of Haldimand is agricultural land, although some heavy industry, including the former Nanticoke Generating Station, is located here.

Smaller communities within the municipality are Attercliffe Station, Balmoral, Bodri Bay, Brookers Bay, Byng, Canborough, Canfield, Cheapside, Clanbrassil, Crescent Bay, Decewsville, Empire Corners, Featherstone Point, Fisherville, Garnet, Hoover Point, Kohler, Little Buffalo, Lowbanks, Moulton Station, Mount Carmel, Mount Healy, Nanticoke, Nelles Corners, Peacock Point, Port Maitland, Rainham Centre, Selkirk, Sims Lock, South Cayuga, Springvale, Stromness, Sweets Corners, Townsend, Willow Grove, Woodlawn Park and York.

The ghost towns of Cook's Station, Cranston, Dufferin, Erie, Indiana, Lambs Corners, Lythmore, Sandusk, Upper, and Varency are also located within Haldimand.

== Historic townships ==
Haldimand County's area of 309,300 acres was formed from part of the land grant to the Six Nations in 1783. The County was purchased by treaty and opened for general settlement in 1832. It was first settled by white veterans of Butler's Rangers established there by Joseph Brant. A large number of Germans were among the first settlers.

- Canborough, area 21,586 acres (87 km^{2}). Granted in 1794 by Joseph Brant to John Dochstader of Butler's Rangers. Purchased by Benjamin Canby in 1810 for £5,000, he named the village site "Canborough. Community centre: Canborough, Darling and it touches Dunnville
- Dunn, area 15,122 acres (61 km^{2}). Opened for settlement in 1833. Community centre: Dunnville
- Moulton, area 27,781 acres (112 km^{2}). Landowner Henry John Boulton named the township from the Boulton family seat in England.
- North Cayuga, area 32,825 acres (133 km^{2}).
- Oneida, area 32,598 acres (132 km^{2}). Joseph Brant granted a 999 year lease of part of Oneida and Seneca townships to Henry Nelles, of Butler's Rangers and his sons, Robert, Abraham, William, Warner and John. Community centres were: Caledonia, Dufferin and Hagersville.
- Rainham, area 25,705 acres (104 km^{2}) Community centres: Balmoral, Selkirk, Rainham Centre and Fisherville.
- Seneca, area 41,721 acres (169 km^{2}). Community centres: York and Caledonia
- Sherbrooke, area 5,098 acres (21 km^{2}), the smallest township in Ontario. Opened in 1825 and named from Sir John Coape Sherbrooke, a Governor-General of Canada. The Township was granted by the Indians to William Dickson (a lawyer) as a professional fee. Community centres: Stromness and Port Maitland.
- South Cayuga, area 13,293 acres (54 km^{2}).
- Walpole, area 66,213 acres (268 km^{2}). Community centres were: Hagersville, Jarvis, Selkirk, Cheapside and Nanticoke.

== Climate ==
Climate data for Haldimand County (2022)
| Month | Jan | Feb | Mar | Apr | May | Jun | Jul | Aug | Sep | Oct | Nov | Dec | Year |
|---|---|---|---|---|---|---|---|---|---|---|---|---|---|
| Record high °C (°F) | 4.5 (40.1) | 10.0 (50.0) | 19.9 (67.8) | 22.1 (71.8) | 30.7 (87.3) | 32.8 (91.0) | 32.5 (90.5) | 31.0 (87.8) | 29.3 (84.7) | 23.7 (74.7) | 24.7 (76.5) | 11.9 (53.4) | 32.8 (91.0) |
| Mean daily maximum °C (°F) | −3.6 (25.5) | −0.1 (31.8) | 5.6 (42.1) | 11.1 (52.0) | 21.1 (70.0) | 25.1 (77.2) | 27.4 (81.3) | 27.2 (81.0) | 21.7 (71.1) | 15.6 (60.1) | 9.5 (49.1) | 2.3 (36.1) | 13.6 (56.5) |
| Daily mean °C (°F) | −8.6 (16.5) | −4.9 (23.2) | 0.9 (33.6) | 5.9 (42.6) | 15.2 (59.4) | 18.4 (65.1) | 21.0 (69.8) | 21.2 (70.2) | 16.2 (61.2) | 9.4 (48.9) | 4.6 (40.3) | −0.7 (30.7) | 8.1 (46.6) |
| Mean daily minimum °C (°F) | −13.6 (7.5) | −9.7 (14.5) | −3.8 (25.2) | 0.7 (33.3) | 9.2 (48.6) | 11.6 (52.9) | 14.6 (58.3) | 15.2 (59.4) | 10.7 (51.3) | 3.1 (37.6) | −0.3 (31.5) | −3.8 (25.2) | 2.9 (37.2) |
| Record low °C (°F) | −22.1 (−7.8) | −19.1 (−2.4) | −12.7 (9.1) | −4.9 (23.2) | 2.9 (37.2) | 4.9 (40.8) | 10.4 (50.7) | 9.7 (49.5) | 2.3 (36.1) | −1.4 (29.5) | −10.2 (13.6) | −16.0 (3.2) | −22.1 (−7.8) |
| Average precipitation mm (inches) | 37.3 (1.47) | 87.1 (3.43) | 60.4 (2.38) | 47.8 (1.88) | 50.8 (2.00) | 76.6 (3.02) | 56.9 (2.24) | 72.1 (2.84) | 47.2 (1.86) | 39.0 (1.54) | 39.7 (1.56) | 64.7 (2.55) | 679.6 (26.76) |
| Average rainfall mm (inches) | 2.3 (0.09) | 56.3 (2.22) | 52.0 (2.05) | 37.0 (1.46) | 50.8 (2.00) | 76.6 (3.02) | 56.9 (2.24) | 72.1 (2.84) | 47.2 (1.86) | 39.0 (1.54) | 36.4 (1.43) | 59.2 (2.33) | 585.8 (23.06) |
| Average snowfall cm (inches) | 35.5 (14.0) | 30.8 (12.1) | 8.4 (3.3) | 10.9 (4.3) | 0 (0) | 0 (0) | 0 (0) | 0 (0) | 0 (0) | 0 (0) | 3.9 (1.5) | 6.3 (2.5) | 95.8 (37.7) |
Source: Environment Canada

== Demographics ==
Historical Populations Haldimand County, ON
| Year | Pop. | ±% |
|---|---|---|
| 1996 | 42,041 | — |
| 2001 | 43,728 | +4.0% |
| 2006 | 45,212 | +3.4% |
| 2011 | 44,876 | −0.7% |
| 2016 | 45,608 | +1.6% |
| 2021 | 49,216 | +7.9% |

In the 2021 Census of Population conducted by Statistics Canada, Haldimand County had a population of 49,216 living in 18,719 of its 20,710 total private dwellings, a change of 7.9% from its 2016 population of 45,608. With a land area of 1,250.45 km^{2} (482.80 sq mi), it had a population density of 39.4/km^{2} (101.9/sq mi) in 2021.

Canada census – Haldimand County community profile

| | 2021 | 2016 | 2011 |
| Population | 49,216 (+7.9% from 2016) | 45,608 (+1.6% from 2011) | 44,876 (−0.7% from 2006) |
| Land area | 1,250.45 km^{2} (482.80 sq mi) | 1,251.54 km^{2} (483.22 sq mi) | 1,251.57 km^{2} (483.23 sq mi) |
| Population density | 39.4/km^{2} (102/sq mi) | 36.4/km^{2} (94/sq mi) | 35.9/km^{2} (93/sq mi) |
| Median age | 43.6 (M: 42.8, F: 44.4) | 44.5 (M: 43.7, F: 45.2) |
| Private dwellings | 20,710 (total) 18,719 (occupied) | 19,472 (total) | 19,108 (total) |
| Median household income | $93,000 | $76,117 | $68,510 |

References: 2021 2016 2011

=== Ethnicity ===
Only ethnic groups that comprise greater than 1% of the population are included. Note that a person can report more than one group.

Ethnic Groups in the City of Haldimand County (2011−2021)
| Ethnic Group | 2021 | | 2016 | | 2011 | |
| Ethnic Group | Pop. | % | Pop. | % | Pop. | % |
|---|---|---|---|---|---|---|
| First Nations (Note: Statistic includes all individuals that identified as Indigenous.) | 1,745 | 3.59% | 2,095 | 4.65% | 2,105 | 4.76% |
| Canadian | 8,770 | 18.06% | 15,455 | 94.67% | 14,190 | 94.76% |
| English | 14,785 | 30.44% | 15,555 | 34.54% | 15,915 | 35.99% |
| Irish | 9,495 | 19.55% | 8,745 | 19.42% | 9,255 | 20.93% |
| Scottish | 11,220 | 23.1% | 11,025 | 24.48% | 11,510 | 26.03% |
| French (Note: Statistic includes all individuals that identified as having a French origin but not otherwise specified.) | 3,045 | 6.27% | 3,895 | 8.65% | 4,260 | 9.63% |
| German | 7,670 | 15.79% | 7,560 | 16.79% | 7,975 | 18.03% |
| Italian | 2,500 | 5.15% | 2,095 | 4.65% | 2,245 | 5.08% |
| Ukrainian | 1,555 | 3.2% | 1,770 | 3.93% | 1,410 | 3.19% |
| Dutch | 6,365 | 13.11% | 6,780 | 15.06% | 6,045 | 13.67% |
| Polish | 1,755 | 3.61% | 1,460 | 3.24% | 1,280 | 2.89% |
| Métis | 485 | 1% | 305 | 0.68% | 285 | 0.64% |
| Welsh | 855 | 1.76% | 785 | 1.74% | 855 | 1.93% |
| Portuguese | 840 | 1.73% | 385 | 0.85% | 575 | 1.3% |
| American | 605 | 1.25% | 365 | 0.81% | 690 | 1.56% |
| Hungarian | 890 | 1.83% | 930 | 2.07% | 710 | 1.61% |
| Total responses | 48,565 | 98.68% | 45,030 | 98.73% | 44,220 | 98.54% |
| Total population | 49,216 | 100% | 45,608 | 100% | 44,876 | 100% |
Note: Totals greater than 100% due to multiple origin responses

Panethnic Groups in the City of Haldimand County (2001−2021)
| Panethnic Group | 2021 | | 2016 | | 2011 | | 2006 | | 2001 | |
| Panethnic Group | Pop. | % | Pop. | % | Pop. | % | Pop. | % | Pop. | % |
|---|---|---|---|---|---|---|---|---|---|---|
| European (Note: Statistic includes all persons that did not make up part of a visible minority or an indigenous identity.) | 44,065 | 90.73% | 42,630 | 94.67% | 41,905 | 94.76% | 43,295 | 96.85% | 41,785 | 96.53% |
| Indigenous | 1,890 | 3.89% | 1,540 | 3.42% | 1,470 | 3.32% | 830 | 1.86% | 970 | 2.24% |
| African | 745 | 1.53% | 220 | 0.49% | 205 | 0.46% | 215 | 0.48% | 165 | 0.38% |
| South Asian | 620 | 1.28% | 215 | 0.48% | 75 | 0.17% | 65 | 0.15% | 75 | 0.17% |
| Southeast Asian (Note: Statistic includes total responses of "Filipino" and "Southeast Asian" under visible minority section on census.) | 350 | 0.72% | 155 | 0.34% | 140 | 0.32% | 35 | 0.08% | 60 | 0.14% |
| East Asian (Note: Statistic includes total responses of "Chinese", "Korean", and "Japanese" under visible minority section on census.) | 235 | 0.48% | 90 | 0.2% | 205 | 0.46% | 155 | 0.35% | 145 | 0.33% |
| Latin American | 210 | 0.43% | 95 | 0.21% | 60 | 0.14% | 30 | 0.07% | 25 | 0.06% |
| Middle Eastern (Note: Statistic includes total responses of "West Asian" and "Arab" under visible minority section on census.) | 200 | 0.41% | 40 | 0.09% | 0 | 0% | 20 | 0.04% | 10 | 0.02% |
| Other (Note: Statistic includes total responses of "Visible minority, n.i.e." and "Multiple visible minorities" under visible minority section on census.) | 245 | 0.5% | 40 | 0.09% | 125 | 0.28% | 40 | 0.09% | 45 | 0.1% |
| Total responses | 48,565 | 98.68% | 45,030 | 98.73% | 44,220 | 98.54% | 44,705 | 98.88% | 43,285 | 98.99% |
| Total population | 49,216 | 100% | 45,608 | 100% | 44,876 | 100% | 45,212 | 100% | 43,728 | 100% |
Note: Totals greater than 100% due to multiple origin responses

=== Languages ===
As of the 2021 census, there were 47,190 citizens that spoke English only, 15 that spoke only French, 1,530 that spoke both official languages and 130 that spoke neither.

=== Religion ===
As of the 2021 census, there were 29,380 citizens identifying as Christian and 18,200 as non-religious and secular perspectives. (Note: Includes only those religions including 1% or more of Haldimand County's population.)

== Local government ==
The city is within the federal electoral riding of Haldimand—Norfolk and within provincial electoral riding of Haldimand—Norfolk.

Haldimand federal election results
| Year | Liberal | | Conservative | | New Democratic | | Green | |
|---|---|---|---|---|---|---|---|---|
| 2021 | 25% | 6,786 | 49% | 13,215 | 15% | 4,075 | 0% | 0 |
| 2019 | 25% | 6,269 | 46% | 11,755 | 17% | 4,456 | 7% | 1,851 |

Haldimand provincial election results
| Year | PC | | New Democratic | | Liberal | | Green | |
|---|---|---|---|---|---|---|---|---|
| 2022 | 34% | 7,011 | 15% | 3,010 | 7% | 1,537 | 4% | 846 |
| 2018 | 57% | 12,457 | 28% | 6,109 | 9% | 1,929 | 4% | 798 |

Current Mayor: Shelley Ann Bentley

Previous Mayors:

- 2010–2022: Ken Hewitt
- 2004–2010: Marie Trainer
- 2000–2004: Lorraine Bergstrand

== Healthcare ==
Healthcare in Haldimand County is overseen by Haldimand-Norfolk Health and Social Services. Hospitals in Haldimand County include Haldimand War Memorial Hospital in Dunnville, and West Haldimand General Hospital in Hagersville.

== Policing ==
Policing in the county is provided by the Haldimand detachment of the Ontario Provincial Police located in Cayuga.

== Fire services ==
Fire services in the county is provided by the Haldimand County Fire Department which was created in 2001 following the separation of Haldimand and Norfolk. The department currently consists of 11 stations located strategically throughout the county. With almost 300 firefighters and 40 fire apparatuses, it is one of the largest volunteer fire departments in Ontario. The department consists of:

- Station 1 – Caledonia
- Station 2 – Hagersville
- Station 3 – Jarvis
- Station 4 – Cayuga (Headquarters)
- Station 5 – Canfield
- Station 6 – Canborough
- Station 7 – Lowbanks
- Station 9 – Dunnville
- Station 11 – South Haldimand
- Station 12 – Fisherville
- Station 13 – Selkirk

== Education ==
Public Schools in Haldimand County are administered by the Grand Erie District School Board. These schools include:

- Caledonia Centennial Public School (Caledonia)
- Oneida Central Public School (Caledonia)
- River Heights Public School (Caledonia)
- JL Mitchener Public School (Cayuga)
- Hagersville Elementary School (Hagersville)
- Walpole North Elementary School (Hagersville)
- Mapleview Elementary School (Dunnville)
- Thompson Creek Elementary School (Dunnville)
- Rainham Central School (Fisherville)
- Jarvis Public School (Jarvis)
- Seneca Central Public School (York)

=== Catholic Education ===
Catholic Schools in Haldimand County are administered by the Brant Haldimand Norfolk Catholic District School Board. These include:

- St. Patrick's Catholic School (Caledonia)
- Notre Dame Catholic School (Caledonia)
- St. Stephen's School (Cayuga)
- St. Michael's School (Dunnville)
- St. Mary's School (Hagersville)
- Jarvis Community Christian School (Jarvis)

== Transportation ==
The Southern Ontario Railway operates in southwestern Haldimand.

Highways that travel through Haldimand include Ontario Highway 3 and Ontario Highway 6.

Several intercity bus companies operate routes that travel through Haldimand County, connecting it to nearby cities and towns. Although, driving is the most common way to get around in Haldimand County, as public transportation options are limited.

== Protected areas ==
- Haldimand Conservation Area
- Selkirk Provincial Park
- Taquanyah Conservation Area
- Hedley Forest Conservation Area
- Canborough Conservation Area
- Ruigrok Tract Conservation Area
- Oswego Conservation Area
- Byng Island Conservation Area
- Rock Point Provincial Park
- Mohawk Island National Wildlife Area

== Attractions ==
- Townsend Planned Community (1970)
- Nanticoke Generating Station

=== Natural Landmarks ===
- Canadian Heritage Grand River
- Grand Valley Trail
- Byng Island Conservation Area and Pool
- Seneca Park & Rotary Riverside Trail

=== Activities ===
- Toronto Motorsports Park (Dragway Park)
- Jukasa Motor Speedway
- Grand River Dinner Cruises
- Killman Zoo
- Caledonia Fair
- Kinsmen Park and Caledonia Lions Pool

=== Heritage ===
- Grand River Bridge and Dam
- Cayuga Library & Heritage Centre
- Edinburgh Square Heritage and Cultural Centre
- Wilson MacDonald Memorial School Museum
- Haldimand House & Oasis Drive-In
- Caledonia Old Mill
- Indiana Ghost Town
- Ruthven Park National Historic Site Mansion and Park
- Cottonwood Mansion
- Caledonia Grand Trunk Station
- No. 6 RCAF Dunnville Museum
- Port Maitland Outer Range Lighthouse and Pier
- Canadian Drilling Rig Museum
- Mohawk Island Lighthouse (abandoned)

== Notable people ==
- Birthplace of Canadian Olympic high jump medalist Ethel Catherwood.
- Birthplace of Canadian Women's Hockey Gold Medalist Becky Kellar-Duke.
- Birthplace of Spud Johnson Major League Baseball player.
- Birthplace of Boston Bruins' Nathan Horton, who won the Stanley Cup in 2011.
- Birthplace of Dallas Stars Head Coach Peter DeBoer.
- Birthplace of Los Angeles Kings goaltender Cam Talbot.
- Birthplace of Peter Robertson, inventor of the Robertson screw.
- Birthplace of Andrew Campbell, former Toronto Maple Leafs Defenseman.
- Birthplace of Allan Roy Edwards, former Detroit Red Wings goaltender.
- Birthplace of Wilson Pugsley MacDonald, a Canadian lyrical poet most famous for his work "Out of the Wilderness".
- Birthplace of the late NHL goaltender Ray Emery, who won Stanley Cup in 2013.
- Birthplace of Marty McSorley, retired NHL player.
- Birthplace of Neil Peart, drummer of the Canadian rock group Rush.

== See also ==
- List of townships in Ontario and Haldimand County
