= Edinburgh Square Heritage and Cultural Centre =

- Former name: Caledonia Town Hall
- Established: 1988
- Location: 80 Caithness St. E, Caledonia, ON N3W 2G6
- Coordinates: 43.073223°N 79.949079°W
- Type: Heritage Museum
- Curator: Anne Unyi
- Parking: On site (no charge)
- Website: www.haldimandcounty.ca/heritage-culture/edinburgh-square-heritage-cultural-centre/

Built in 1857, this historic building once served as Caledonia, Ontario's first and only town hall. The building stopped being used as a town hall sometime around 1955 until it was reopened as "Edinburgh Square Heritage and Cultural Centre" in the spring of 1988. The Edinburgh Square Heritage and Cultural Centre is a museum dedicated to preserving the local heritage of Caledonia, Ontario and its surrounding areas. Edinburgh Square was declared a heritage building in 1982.

== Collection, Exhibits and Events ==
Edinburgh Square Heritage and Cultural Centre serves as an active reference archive and educational centre for its community. It houses a former jail cell that was used in Caledonia, Ontario for around 70 years and a display regarding the gypsum mining industry which brought major mining businesses to the Grand River throughout the 20th century. The Edinburgh Square Heritage and Cultural Centre also houses the Gillespie Clark Reference Library, filled with books, files and documents relating to Caledonia's intimate history and the genealogy of its residents. In addition, the library holds a collection of the Grand River Sachem dating back to 1856.

== History ==
When Caledonia was incorporated as a village in 1853, talks of a town hall quickly began. The first official mention of a town hall was made on February 28, 1854. John Turner of Brantford, Ontario was asked to construct plans for a 30 feet (9.1 m) x 50 feet (15 m), 2 storey brick building with a stone basement. He did all of this for a fee of 7, 10 shillings, beginning his work on December 23, 1856. The town hall and lock-up house was built by Bird & Johnson during the year of 1857. They completed all this work for £1,275 and the council's first meeting in the newly construct town hall was January 18, 1858.

When it was first constructed, the second floor was used for council meetings, community meetings and events and more. The main floor was intended to be residence for the constable and keeper of the building. The basement was originally a lock-up house and a meat market with an entrance beneath the front steps of the building. The first keeper of Edinburgh Square was Constable Belford in 1858.

The jail in the basement ceased use in this function sometime in the 1930s, prisoners being transferred to Cayuga jail instead. However, the constable's living quarters remained in the town hall until 1955. The most notable of these was Constable Bill Stotts, locally known as the "lovable constable". Notably, his duties also included dog catcher, selling dog licenses and returning stray animals to their owners. He was also traffic director and had an office on the corner of Argyle and Caithness Streets, provided to him by a local merchant, which he used to keep a lookout on the town. He lived in Edinburgh Square between the years 1937 and 1955. During the 1950s it was decided that Caledonia had outgrown the designation of village and became a town, having a population of more than 1,500 at the time.

Culture and Recreation officials from Haldimand County toured Caledonian landmarks in April 1981. They toured both Edinburgh Square and the Caledonia Mill in search of a possible museum site. It was decided that Edinburgh Square was the more suitable location and was designated a heritage building on January 25, 1982. After some construction to raise the building to modern standards of building and accessibility, the building re-opened in spring 1988 as the "Edinburgh Square Heritage & Cultural Centre".
