= Caledonia station (Grand Trunk Railway) =

Railway station in Canada

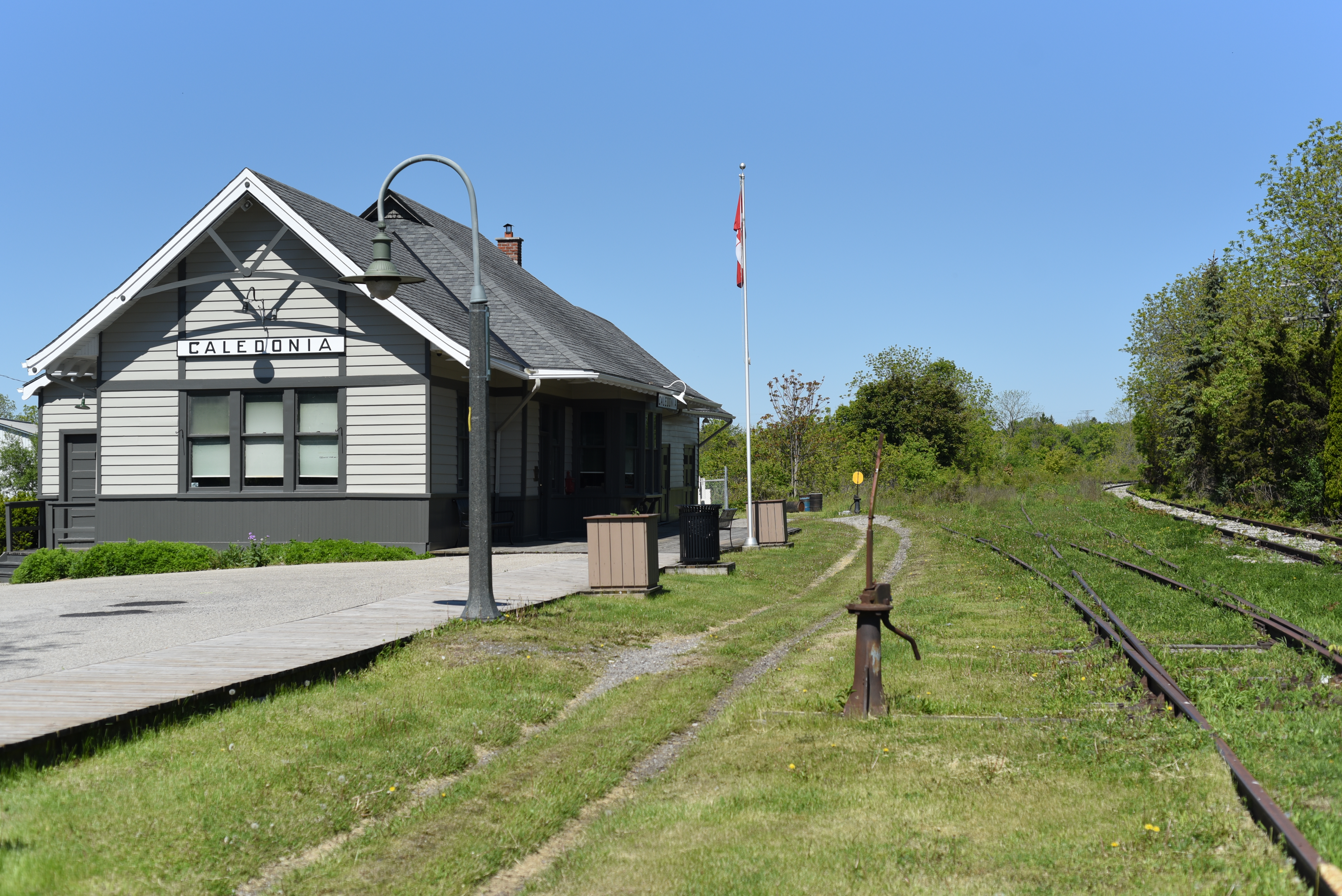
- Caledonia station in May 2025.

General information
- Location: 1 Grand Trunk Lane, Caledonia, Ontario; Canada
- Coordinates: 43°04′41″N 79°57′05″W
- Elevation: 212.5

Other information
- Status: Chamber of Commerce & Tourist Information Centre

History
- Opened: September 30, 1908
- Closed: September 1996
- Rebuilt: November 1997

Former Services
| Preceding station | Canadian National Railway | Following station |
|---|---|---|
| Middleport toward Stratford | Stratford – Fort Erie | Seneca toward Fort Erie |
| Willow Grove toward St. Thomas | St. Thomas – Hamilton | Glanford toward Hamilton |
Location

Caledonia railway station was built in 1908 by the Grand Trunk Railway Company of Canada. The station was the third to be built in Caledonia, Ontario.

== History ==
Historically, Buffalo, Brantford and Goderich Railway (BB&G) began to move train traffic through Caledonia between 1852-1856. When the opportunity arose, James Little, founder of the Haldimand House, lobbied the town to bankrupt itself to secure a railroad line to pass through Caledonia instead of Cayuga. This line serviced Jarvis to Hamilton and was quickly extended out as far as Port Dover. The 'Railway Hotel' was opened sometime before or during 1860 by William Slater.

The first Caledonia railway station was located in the Slater Hotel located where a Tim Hortons restaurant stands on the North Side of the Grand River. This station burned down in a fire about 1870. When railway traffic increased Grand Trunk realized the benefits of a full-sized station in Caledonia. Around 1877, a station was built on the present location. This station burned down again November 13, 1907, and plans were made for a new, bigger station.

The fire also destroyed a grain elevator which had been built by Hull & Old around 1867 as a steam-powered grist mill. A new elevator was built, which burned to the ground in September 1996, never to be rebuilt.

This new, bigger station was to include a passenger waiting room, men's and ladies' smoking rooms, freight room and two restrooms, as well as office spaces in the east end. The Ticket Wicket was said to be one of the finest in the Country. Grand Trunk operated the station until the Canadian National Railway took over the building, and the entire Grand Trunk Operation, in 1923.

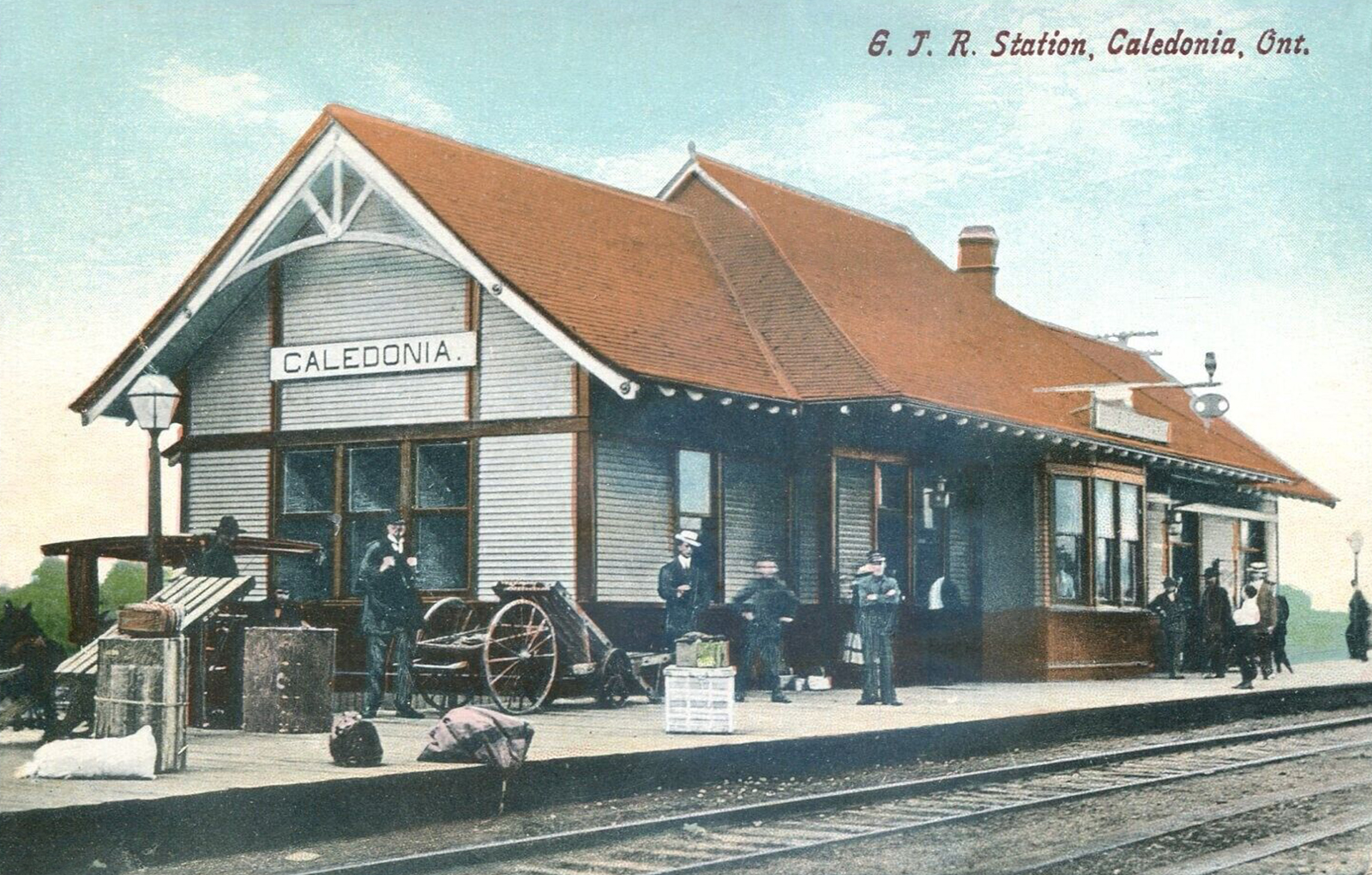
Caledonia station c. 1910

At this point, an extended freight and maintenance room was added to the west end of the building. Also at this time, the then popular red "insul-brick" was used to cover up the Grand Trunk colour Scheme of beige and park green. The Station operated under CN Rail until October 1957 when they canceled passenger service to Caledonia, Cayuga, Port Dover, Hagersville, and Jarvis. The last "Port Dover Granny" to stop at Caledonia was on October 26, 1957. Parcel and freight service continued until November 1977. CN used the station as a maintenance depot up to the mid-1980s after which it fell into disrepair.

In August 1996 CN filed notice to abandon and demolish the station, and subsequently sell off the land on which it stood. Ron Clark of Caledonia purchased the station and donated it to the Special Projects Committee of the Caledonia & Regional Chamber of Commerce, which then formed a Grand Trunk Station Society to maintain the building. Extensive work was done, including new foundations, roof, and restoring the original beige and park Green wooden siding from the Grand Trunk era. The official opening of the newly restored station was held November 27, 1997, fourteen months after work began by the 'Grand Trunk Train Crew'.

The restored station now accommodates a Grand Trunk Railway Museum, offices for the Caledonia & Regional Chamber of Commerce, rental space, and a meeting room for community organizations.
