= Caledonia Dam =

Dam in Ontario, Canada

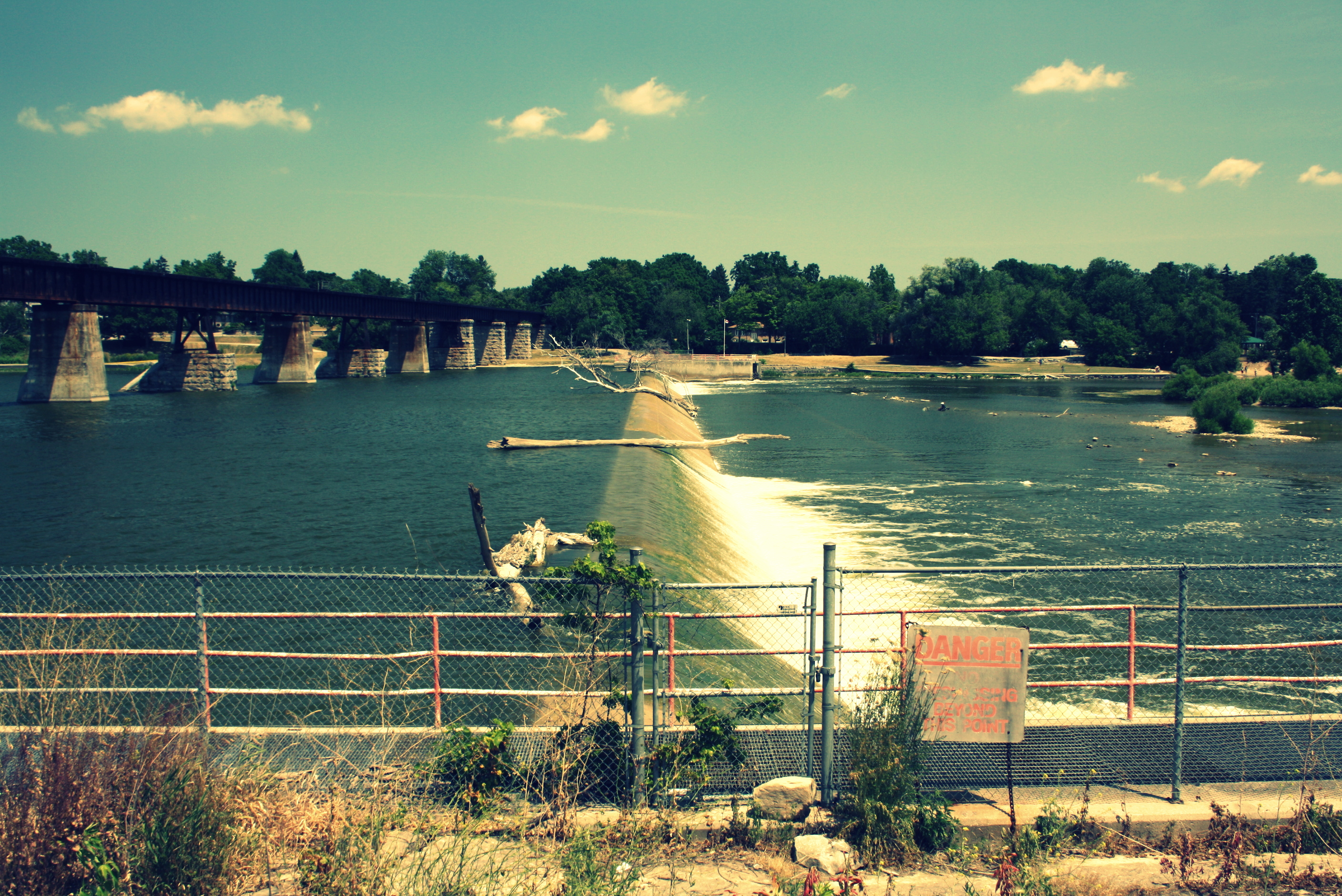
- Caledonia Dam from the South bank.

- Location within Ontario
- Official name: Caledonia Dam
- Country: Canada
- Coordinates: 43.07353°N 79.96020°W
- Opening date: 22 October, 1980
- Operator: Grand River Conservation Authority

Dam and spillways
- Impounds: Grand River (Ontario)
- Length: 700 feet (210 m)

The Caledonia Dam, also known as the Grand River Dam, is a dam on the Grand River constructed upstream from the Caledonia Bridge in Caledonia, Ontario, Canada.

== History ==
The first Caledonia Dam was constructed between 1836 and 1842 by the Grand River Navigation Company. The contractor, Ranald McKinnon, is known as Caledonia's founder because of his role in the building of this dam.

Known as Dam #4, Caledonia housed Lock #4, which was also built by the Navigation Company. The dams located along the Grand River allowed boat access from the mouth of the Grand all the way to Brantford, providing an easy route for travelers and scows for shipping.

Navigation on the Grand slowed around 1879 and many of the Navigation Company dams fell into disrepair in the years following. The first Caledonia Dam also provided enough run of mill to allow water-powered mills to be constructed along the banks of the Grand in Caledonia. Ranald McKinnon built a gristmill, saw mill, and woollen (textile) Mill on the North side of the river, and James Little built the Caledonia Mill on the south side.

At the start of the 20th century, the ownership of Caledonia's dam was split between the two milling companies: The Caledonia Milling Co. Ltd. who owned the South mill, and The Shirra Milling Co. who owned the north mill. When the dam broke in 1928, The Shirra Milling Co. could not afford their share of repairs and so a deal was worked out with the Caledonia Milling Co. Ltd. Between 1928 and 1930, the original Caledonia dam was gradually replaced with a new concrete dam, built by the Caledonia Milling Co. Ltd. This dam broke in 1979, and was replaced with the current dam in 1980.

The new dam was built further downstream, since it was no longer needed to run mills on the river. Both the remaining Mills had closed in 1964, and the North Mill had burned in 1969.

The 1980 dam was built by the Grand River Conservation Authority, and is still maintained by the GRCA today. When constructed, a provision for a boat lock was made so that, if in the future the GRCA wished to make the Grand River navigable once again, only a small amount of construction would need to be undertaken on the dam structure. The dam was built with fish ladders to allow fish migration up the river as far as Brantford and a clay blanket to control the water seepage under the dam.
