= Haldimand House =

Historic former stagecoach in Caledonia, Ontario, Canada

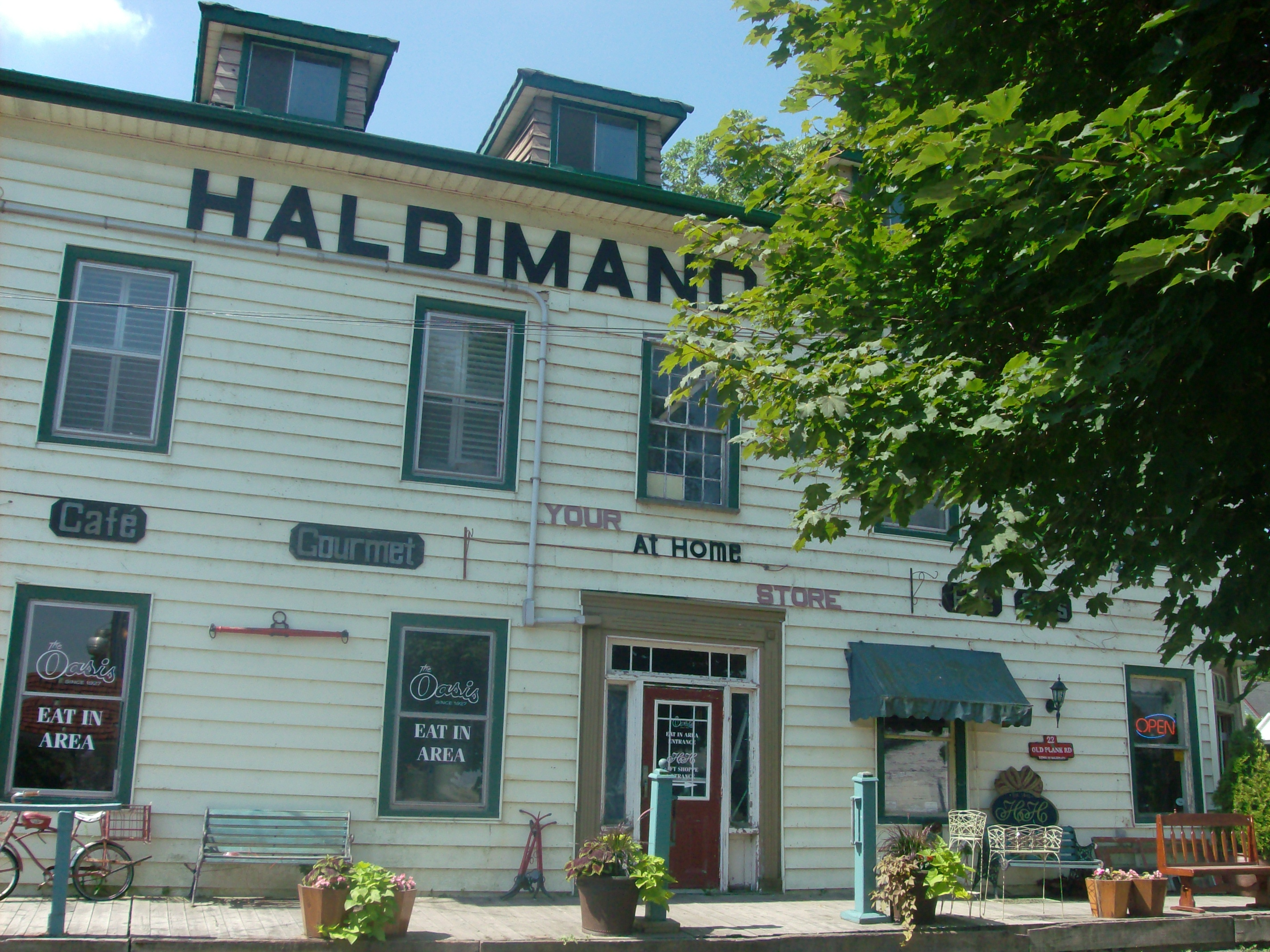
- Haldimand House in 2012

- Location within Ontario
- 43.070248°N 79.953397°W
- Location: 22 Argyle St. S, Caledonia, ON N3W 1E5

History
- Built: 1837
- Original use: Coaching Inn, Bar and Boarding House

Site notes
- Elevation: 211.8 metres (695 ft)
- Restored: 1990-1992
- Restored by: Jouis and Chris Leousis
- Current use: Biker, Gift and Antique Store

Haldimand House is an historic building in Caledonia, Ontario that is one of the oldest in the town. At the time of its construction it was the first in Haldimand County to receive a hotel license and was also the first commercial building in Haldimand County.

Originally built as a stagecoach inn, Haldimand House has served as a hotel and bar, a boarding house, apartments and then a series of small retail establishments

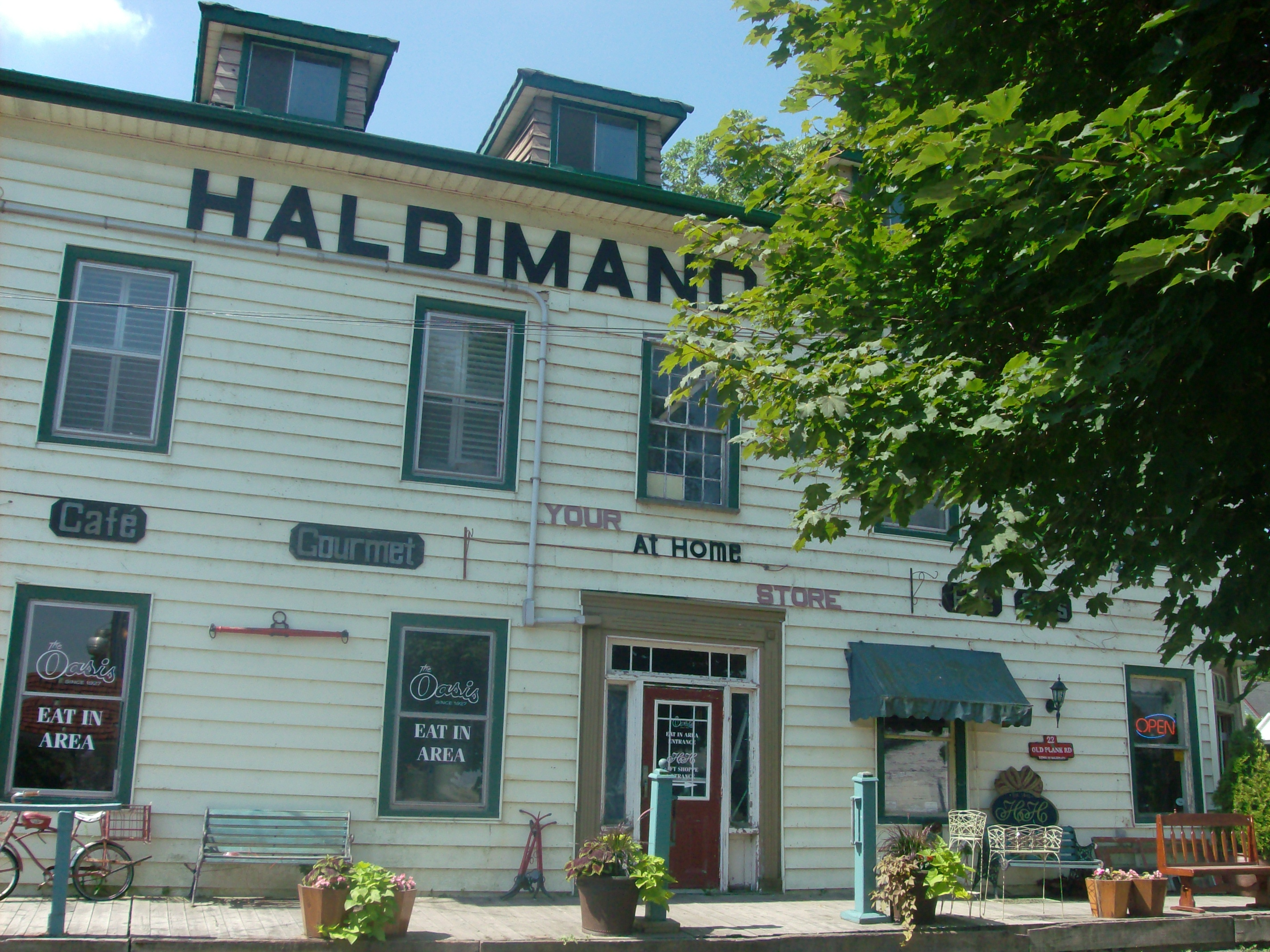
Haldimand House in 2012

== Early years ==
In 1837, James Little started construction of a stagecoach inn that he would call Haldimand House. He named it after Sir Frederick Haldimand, Governor of Upper Canada. Shortly after beginning construction, Little received his Crown patents and was legally given possession of the land he was developing. Construction on the Haldimand House finished in 1839, a copy of James Little's house in Seneca Village.

Haldimand House was built three stories high using squared timbers cut at Little's saw mill in Seneca, Ontario. Just before finishing construction, Little moved his house in Seneca off its foundation and transported it by barge to Caledonia, where he attached it to the back of Haldimand House.

== On The Stagecoach Route ==
Little opened shop in 1842. The business boomed early on as one of the main stops on the stagecoach route between Hamilton and Port Dover. The hotel quickly built up a reputation for famous ciders. Little moved his post office into Haldimand House in 1842, but was petitioned by the locals to move it back into Seneca on the North side of the river. The postmaster general ordered he comply with the petition.

Later in 1842, Little sold Haldimand House to Bridget Britton. Britton added his name to the stenciled 'Haldimand House' on the facade of the Building. It now read 'Haldimand House B. Brittons'. During Britton's ownership, Haldimand House was home to the campaign office of William Lyon McKenzie. After winning the election, McKenzie held a party in Haldimand House.

The Haldimand House had electricity in 1860, a generating station at the Dam provided the power. Britton sold Haldimand House to the Sutherland family in the late 1860s. In 1870, they sold it James Hayes. Hayes changed the facaded to read 'Haldimand House J'AS Hayes'

Hayes continued to operate Haldimand House as a hotel and bar until his death in 1900, His daughter, Miss Maggie Hayes, sold the building on August 1, 1900 to Matthew Richardson.

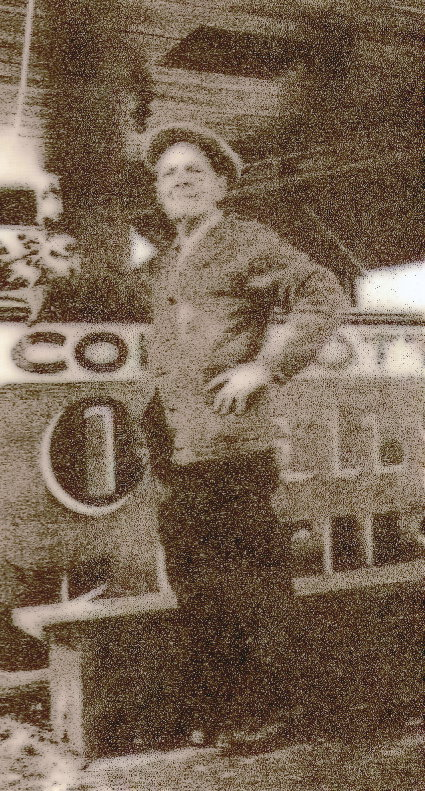
A photo from the 1930s showing Walter Richardson in front of his Cone Cottage Refreshment stand.

== The Richardson Family ==
The Richardsons operated Haldimand house as a hotel and bar until the early 1900s when the hotel license was cancelled.

During World War I, Haldimand House served as a boarding house for soldiers before they were shipped overseas to Europe. Mrs. Richardson ran a strict household, and was frequently upset by muddy sheets and messes created by the soldiers.

In the 1920s, prohibition in Ontario closed the bar in Haldimand House. In 1927 Walter Richardson took over Haldimand House. He opened a billiard hall in the old bar and constructed the Cone Cottage Refreshment stand, which would become The Oasis in the 1950s.

In the early 1950s, after Walter Richardson's death, Haldimand House was split into five apartments: two on the first and second floor and one on the third. In 1959 there was a fire on the top floor apartment caused by Mrs. Caroline Richardson lighting her gas furnace. The fire was prevented from spreading past the second floor. Leslie Richardson had just returned home five hours before the fire from a vacation in Mexico. He went to sleep at 7am, and was woken up at 12 noon by his mother, who told him about the fire.

Les was a boy scout leader in Caledonia, and his troop of boy scouts along with several cub scouts showed up to Haldimand House and assisted removing large numbers of books and small objects to prevent smoke and water damage. At this time the dormers were added to the third-floor roof line.

== Recent years ==
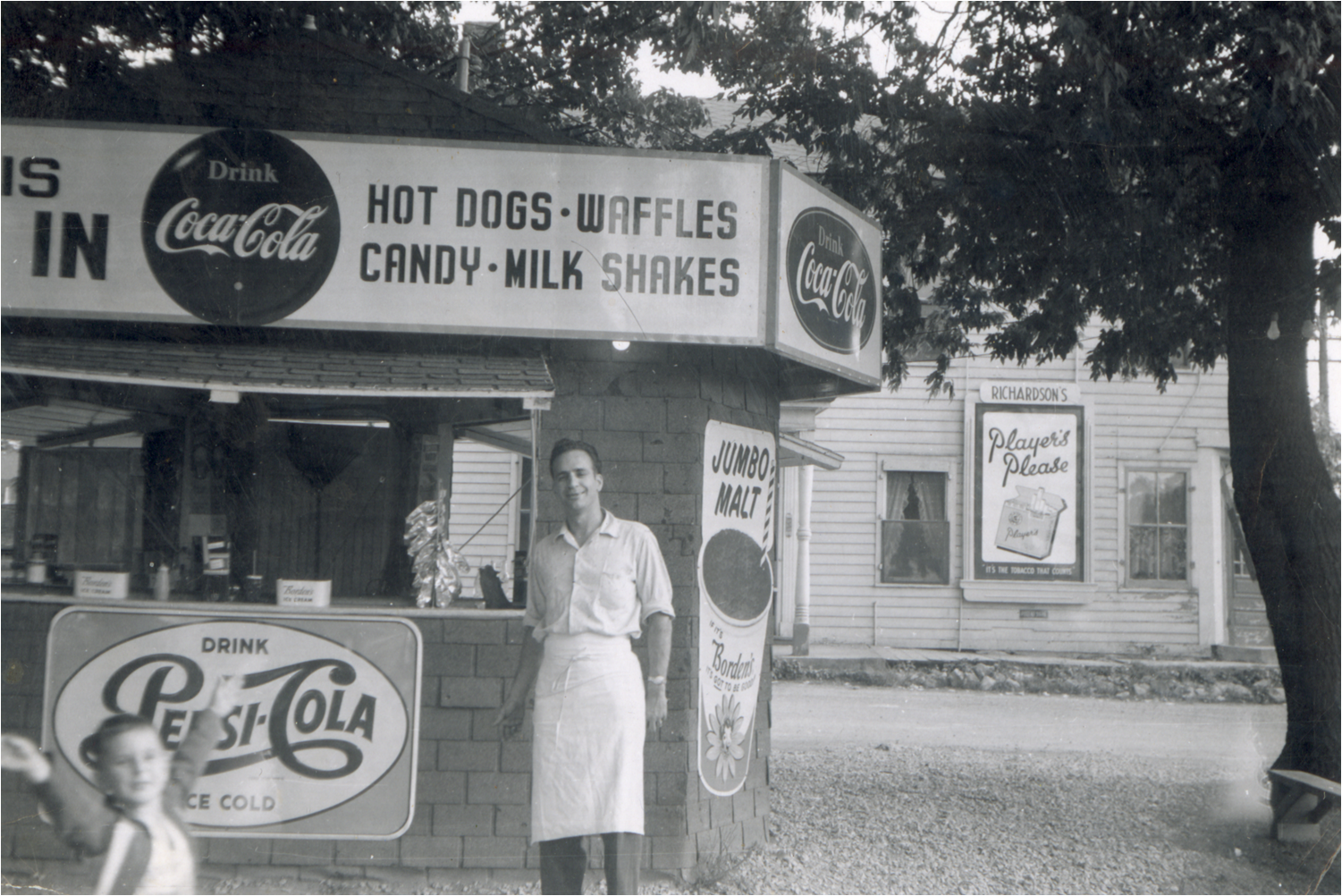
A photo of Caledonia's Oasis Drive-In in 1956. Pictured are Tom Leousis (left) and his father Louis Leousis (right).

In 1991, when Leslie Richardson (Walter & Caroline's son) died, Haldimand House was sold to Louis and Chris Leousis whose family had run the Oasis since 1956. In the early 1990s Chris ripped out the first floor apartments and uncovered the original plank flooring and tin ceilings and walls from the days of the old hotel.

In 1992 Haldimand House was opened as a gift and antique store. Through the 1990s the Leousis's spent many hours renovating and restoring Haldimand House. In 1995 the Haldimand House Beanery and Cafe was opened in the section of the building which was once James Little's House.

The Cafe was closed in 2006 and the gift and gift basket business was discontinued. In 1936, the Caledonia Candy Company was started by the Vlachos family in Caledonia. In 2014 Alex Leousis revived the Caledonia Candy Company after several years of hiatus.

Today Haldimand House houses an antique store.
