= Pine Grove, Norfolk County, Ontario =

Coordinates: 42°46′48″N 80°27′25″W

Pine Grove is a hamlet in Norfolk County, Ontario, Canada, near Delhi. The surrounding terrain of the village is mostly wooded. Pine Grove is very centralized to towns and communities that have necessary services for Pine Grove residents.

== Summary ==
This hamlet is located in Norfolk County Ward 4 for municipal elections.

Most students here attend either Walsh Public School (secular) or St. Michael's in Walsh (Roman Catholic) for their elementary and junior high school education. These students would eventually attend Delhi District Secondary School (secular), Simcoe Composite School (secular), Holy Trinity Catholic High School (Roman Catholic) or Valley Heights Secondary School (secular) for their high school education.

Pine Grove contains a gas station, a car repair shop, and a ginseng farm. In addition to residential roads, Regional Road 1 (also known as McDowell Road) and Pine Grove Road (formerly known as Delhi Road) are the main automobile routes. The majority of Pine Grove residents read The Simcoe Reformer as their preferred newspaper, although the Brantford Expositor was delivered here until the mid-1990s.

To the south of the community is a managed forest area; with plenty of wild grass, poison ivy and the threat of falling trees during times of high wind speeds. American robins can be commonly found along the residential streets in addition to New World orioles and various species of butterflies. Downy woodpeckers and American crows are also found in the managed forest area; first seen in that area in April 2019.

In addition to a planned set of private driveways and local roads, County Road 1 (also known as McDowell Road) and Pinegrove Road (formerly known as Delhi Road) are the main automobile routes. The northern end of the community is an elite residential neighborhood with lavish mansions averaging around $600,000 while the southern end of the community is a typical working class residential community with single-family detached homes costing around $200,000. Neil Adcock's development company was responsible for developing the northern end from approximately 2006 to the present day; hydro was fully established sometime in 2012.

Pine Grove is well-known for its quiet atmosphere; with a variety of car-friendly streets and reliable access to local restaurants within the towns of Simcoe, Delhi, Langton, Tillsonburg, and Brantford. The community is not known for having a vibrant nightlife and most residents here shop online using their wi-fi Internet. Groceries and cafe services have to be acquired by using private transportation or through expensive taxis. Pine Grove is not entirely pedestrian-friendly, as it is challenging to walk from one end of the community to the other for exercise.

== Cemetery ==
A historic Baptist cemetery is located here. While it is no longer an active cemetery, the Pinegrove Baptist Cemetery hosts more than 60 locals who died in the early history of this community.

Most of the people who are buried here were born in the 19th century and died prior to the Second World War; burials done in the 20th century are a rarity at this cemetery. Old-fashioned given names like Jennie, Bertha, Melvin, Rachel, Margaret, and Eleanor can be found in this cemetery.

== Climate ==
The winter of 1975 was the only unusually mild winter in the region from 1897 to 1977. From the late 1990s onwards, winters became more mild due to changes in climate brought on by global warming. Pine Grove traditionally belongs to the humid continental climate zone, even with the recent mild winters and warmer dry summers. As in all communities, towns and cities throughout the world, global warming due to human industrial activity has drastically altered the climate of Pine Grove over the decades.

The warmest summers that Pine Grover has witnessed occurred in 1998, 2003, 2005, 2006, 2007, 2009 (with the exception of the month of July), 2010, 2012, 2013, 2014, 2015 and 2016.

Should the sea levels rise by 60 metres or 200 feet, Pine Grove is not located close enough to salt water to be affected directly by flooding. However, it would suffer indirectly from droughts due to the displacement of available freshwater resources and would have to rely on desalinated salt water piped in from hundreds of miles away. Many major cities near salt water already pipe in their water from freshwater sources hundreds of miles away like Los Angeles; which is located in the middle of a desert.
