= Blayney, Ontario =

Community of Norfolk County, Ontario, Canada

Blayney is a hamlet in Norfolk County, Ontario, Canada that is in between Pine Grove and Green's Corners.

Blayney's earliest known inhabitants, from around the year 1000 until approximately 300–350 years later, were the Algonquin nation. They were noted flint-workers and evidence of their skill in crafting arrowheads is still to be found in open worked field areas surrounding the village. The next wave of inhabitants were the Attawandaron nation, the Neutrals, who occupied the region from about 1350 until their absorption by the Iroquois in the year 1651. The last significant native nation to occupy the area was the Mississaugas.

In 2001, Haldimand-Norfolk was dissolved into two separate single-tier counties. Blayney became part of the newly formed County of Norfolk.

It is the birthplace of Rick Danko, a founding member of The Band.

== Summary ==
Established prior to 1920, it is considered to be one of Norfolk County's lost hamlets. It once hosted its own post office and general store before they were burnt down sometime after 1920. There was a Blayney post office and a grocery store in the early 1900s. The post office burnt to the ground and the grocery store was in the area where Rick Danko was raised.

There is no commerce and agriculture is the main industry. The hamlet is formed on the crossroads of Yuell Road and Regional Road 1 (known locally as McDowell Road). On Yuell Road South, there is a house that is almost completely underground. To the northwest is Delhi and to the southeast is Walsh. The nearest gas station is in Pine Grove. Groceries, toiletries, and clothing are purchased from either Simcoe, Delhi, or Tillsonburg.

Students go to Walsh Public School for their elementary/junior high education and either Delhi District Secondary School, Valley Heights Secondary School, or Simcoe Composite School for their high school education.

Rick Danko, a musician and founding member of The Band, has a historical plaque dedicated to him near his childhood home. He performed on a 4-string tenor banjo shortly after entering grade 1. As a child, Danko was hyperactive, but was diagnosed in an era before Ritalin became mainstream.

=== Climate ===
The winter of 1975 was the only unusually mild winter in the region from 1897 to 1977. From the late 1990s onwards, winters became more mild due to changes in climate brought on by global warming. Blayney traditionally belongs to the humid continental climate zone, even with the recent mild winters and warmer dry summers. As in all communities, towns and cities throughout the world, global warming due to human industrial activity has drastically altered the climate of Blayney over the decades.

The warmest summers that Blayney has witnessed occurred in 1998, 2003, 2005, 2006, 2007, 2009 (with the exception of the month of July), 2010, 2012, 2013, 2014, 2015 and 2016.

Should the sea levels rise by 60 metres or 200 feet, Blayney is not located close enough to salt water to be affected directly by flooding.
