= Walsh, Ontario =

Community of Norfolk County, Ontario, Canada

- Unincorporated Hamlet in Norfolk County
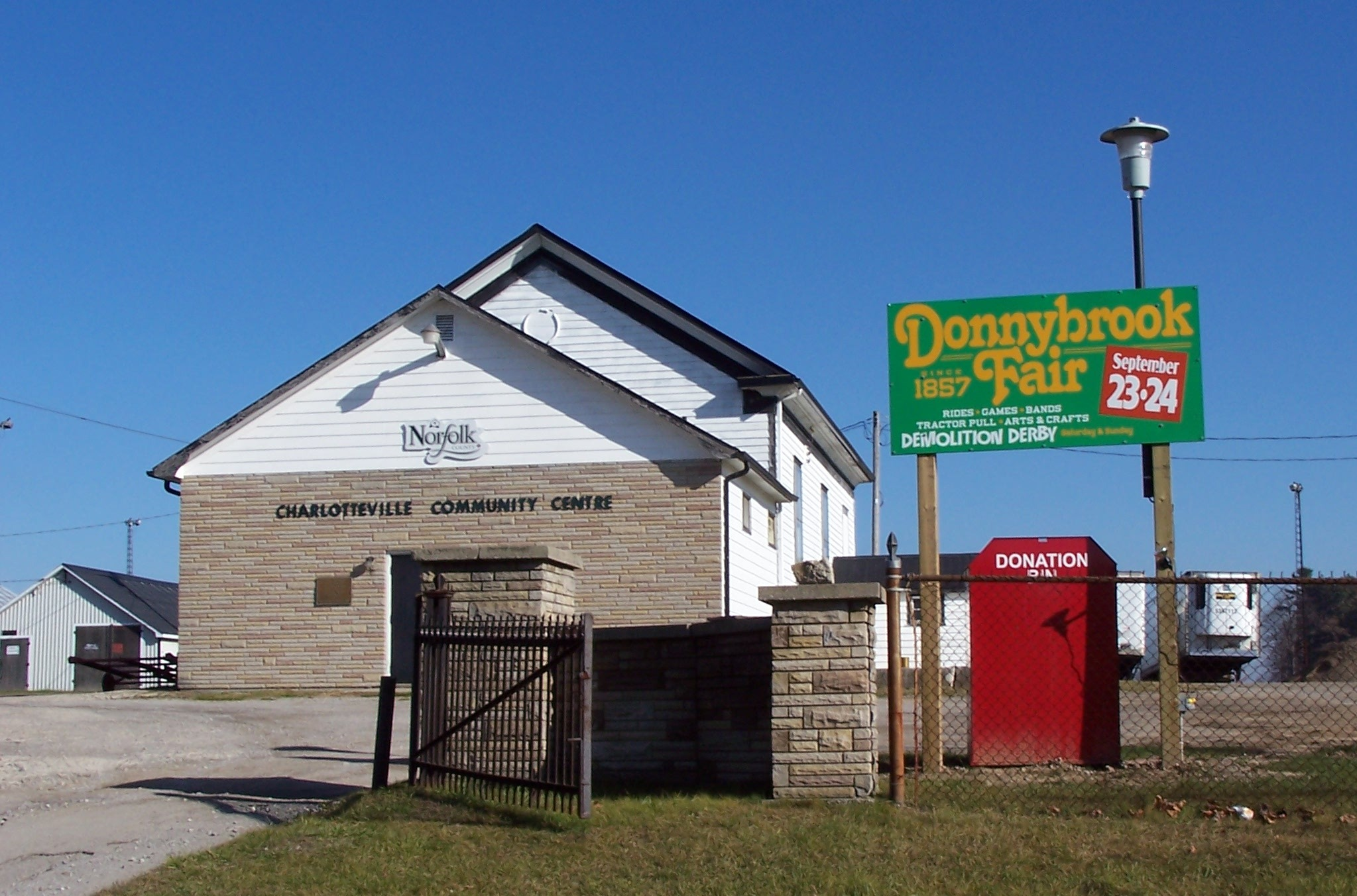
- Charlotteville Community Hall erected in 1868

- Location of Walsh in Ontario
- Coordinates: 42°45′51″N 80°23′17″W
- Country: Canada
- Province: Ontario
- Established: 1850 as Charlotteville Centre
- Amalgamated into Norfolk County: 2001 (Single-tier municipality)

Government
  - Mayor: Kristal Chopp
  - Governing Body: The Council of The Corporation of Norfolk County
  - MPs: Diane Finley (Con)
  - MPPs: Toby Barrett (PC)
- Elevation: 224 m (735 ft)
- Time zone: UTC-5 (EST)
  - Summer (DST): UTC-4 (EDT)
- Forward sortation area: N3Y 4K1
- Area codes: 519 and 226
- Website: www.norfolkcounty.ca

Walsh (formerly known as Charlotteville Centre) is a medium-sized hamlet in Norfolk County, Ontario, Canada.

== Summary ==
Walsh developed as a township central crossroads gathering point on Young's Creek, in the first quarter of the 19th century. A number of service businesses have come and gone over the years, as road quality improved and practical travel distances increased. No commercial business are remaining in the community, although Walsh is home to two elementary schools, two Christian churches, the township community hall that hosts an annual fall fair and the operating headquarters of a major regional transportation company.

Walsh is located near streams, valleys, conservation areas, and bays. Notable attractions within a reasonable driving distance of Walsh include the Norfolk County Fair and Horse Show, Turkey Point Beach, Lake Erie, and various rural cemeteries. During the fall months, pumpkins become abundant in the area - especially the rare "dwarf albino" pumpkin. Robins can be seen strutting through the local gardens for all 12 months of the year. Along the Turkey Point Road, tobacco kilns can be seen in threesomes. During the 19th and early 20th centuries, a wholesaler was once stationed here. It had become a private residence by the early 1990s.

This is the Walsh General Store, owned and operated by Mr. Colwell, as seen in the 1950s.

A local businessman by the name of Bruce R. Smith starting hauling dairy products out of his trucking business in Walsh starting back in 1947. His son, John, took over the business in the mid-1970s and expanded the business and slowly recruited the help of 230 power units and 750 semi-trailer trucks delivering goods throughout Quebec, Ontario, and the United States over the decades. Food products in addition to steel from the Stelco Lake Erie Works greenfield steel mill are delivered with the help of global positioning systems and a computerized dispatch system that allows for networking over a wide area. As of 2012, there are 350 rank-and-file employees in addition to 210 professional operators and 50 operators that own their own vehicles.

Most people get their television either through Shaw Direct, Bell Satellite TV or over-the-air. Two channels (CIII-DT and CITY-DT) can be picked up reliably using an outdoor antenna while an additional three channels (WNYB-DT, CICO-DT, and CKCO-DT) can be picked up semi-reliably. There are at least 12 channels that can be picked up over-the-air only during sunny days where clouds are absent.

=== Education ===
This community is home to two elementary schools: Walsh Public School (within the Grand Erie District School Board) and St. Michael's Catholic Elementary School (administered by the Brant Haldimand Norfolk Catholic District School Board). During the peak of local population growth in the mid-19th century, 14 one-room and two-room schools were functioning within the Township of Charlotteville.

Walsh Area Public School was constructed in 1959 on an open-field site along the north side of St. John's Road, between the Turkey Point Road and Young's Creek. It opened in March 1960, a four-room school that culminated a five-year consolidation effort that merged four one- and two-room elementary schools within five miles of the village: Walsh, Tisdale, Elmwood and McKnight. The guest of honour at the official opening in September 1960 was Education Minister and future Premier John Robarts. Expansion of the public school came in three phases over the next 15 years to achieve its current configuration. It also had its name shortened to Walsh Public School.

The children of Walsh Public School were involved in an attempt to break the Guinness Book of Records for reading on January 26, 2009. A relaxation room (dubbed the Snoezelen Room from the Dutch words snufflen - to seek out - and doezelen - to snooze) has been installed on the premises to relax hyperactive children in addition to children on the autistic spectrum who unintentionally disrupt their classes. They often return to their classroom after a few minutes of relaxation in this sensation-filled room without having to visit the principal for disciplinary measures. Soft music is constantly played in the room while children with special needs can either touch or hear calming sensations. In September 2013, Walsh Public School started to provide an all-day kindergarten program.

The Grand Erie Board administers four secondary schools to which Walsh graduates can advance: Simcoe Composite School, Port Dover Composite School, Delhi District Secondary School and Valley Heights Secondary School.

St. Michael's Elementary School was launched in the early 1950s, initially in the basement of St. Michael's Catholic Church next door. The current school was opened in January 1961 as a two-room school and subsequently has been expanded to the present structure. Graduates can advance preferentially to Holy Trinity Catholic High School in Simcoe.

A local bursary; known as the Charlotteville Bursary has been traditionally awarded for secondary school graduates from the Walsh area as an incentive to attend either the college or university of their choice.

=== Nearest communities ===
Walsh is located near these major communities: Simcoe - 14 kilometres (8.7 mi), Delhi - 15 kilometres (9.3 mi), Port Dover - 18 kilometres (11 mi), Tillsonburg - 35 kilometres (22 mi), Brantford - 56 kilometres (35 mi) and Woodstock - 60 kilometres (37 mi).

Mount Forest is located 54.8 kilometres or 34.1 miles to the north of this community. It is an unincorporated community located on the junction of Ontario Highways 6 and 89 in the township of Wellington North.

=== Places of worship ===
The first Christian community established in Walsh was the Charlotteville Methodist Church, constructed in 1856 and located 1.3 kilometres to the south. That community thrived through the 1925 merger that created the United Church of Canada and beyond but suffered badly from declining membership during the Great Depression and it ceased operation in the early 1940s. After being vacant for nearly 20 years, the building was demolished in 1962. A commemorative monument remains, in the northeast corner of the cemetery.

Two churches in the area continue to provide the spiritual and religious needs of the local residents: Walsh Baptist Church and St. Michael's Roman Catholic Church.

Walsh Baptist Church was established in 1876 and has served a thriving community of worshippers since that time. During the first few decades of the 20th century, a close collaboration developed with the Charlotteville Methodist Church. When the Walsh United Church dissolved early during the Second World War, their remaining members were welcomed into the Baptist community. The Baptist church annex including Sunday school classrooms, church hall, kitchen, and washrooms was constructed during the winter of 1961–62.

The Walsh Baptist Church is led by Pastor Marc Bertrand; who has served the region since 2003.

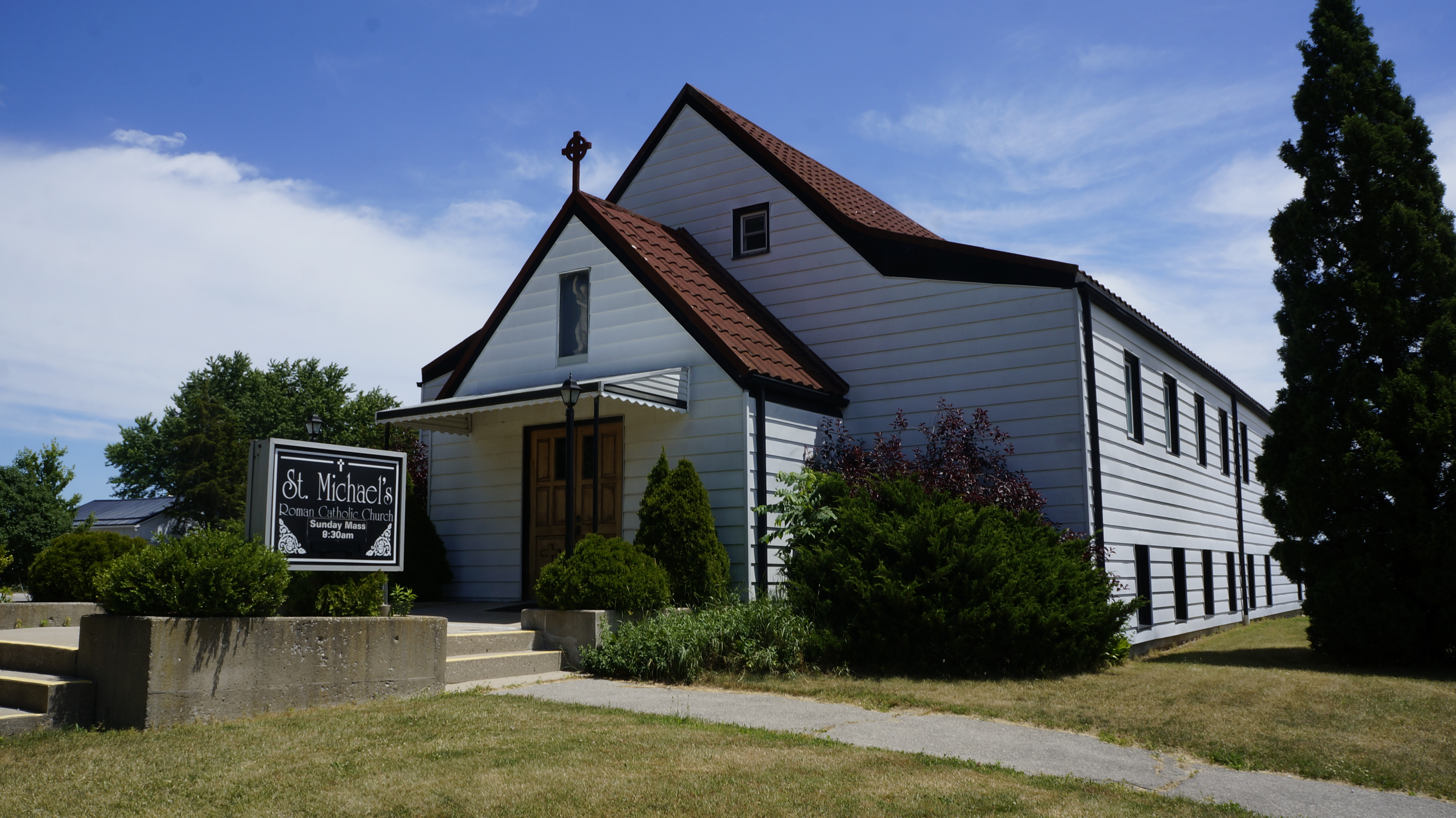
St. Michael's Catholic Church

St. Michael's Catholic Church was established in 1947. Although it functioned as a mission church of St. Cecilia's Parish in Port Dover in earlier years, St. Michael's is now under the care of the Sacred Heart Parish in Langton.

Another church that survived for about 35 years was the independent Faith Baptist Church, which officially broke away from the congregation of the regular Baptist church in 1926. Located in a white frame building on the southeast corner of the main intersection, dwindling membership eventually forced the church to cease operations in the early 1960s. After several years of commercial usage, the building was demolished.

=== Cemeteries ===
The Walsh Baptist Cemetery is situated on a sheltered hilltop on the east side of the Turkey Point Road, 400 metres or 1,300 feet north of the main intersection. It has the buried remains of at least 133 individuals or families. Common last names of people buried at the Walsh Baptist Cemetery include Atkinson, Bingleman, Bint, Bye, Cope, Ferris, Pepper, and Shepherd. The Walsh Baptist Cemetery is still functional as of 2020 and it was established around 1864.

Walsh's other cemetery is the Walsh United Church Cemetery. It has at least 533 individuals and/or families buried there. People buried there were typically born between the late-19th century to the mid-20th century. Common last names found at the Walsh United Cemetery are Armstong, Anderson, Barker, Becker, Bingleman, and Boughner. The Walsh United Church Cemetery is still functional as of 2020 and it was established around 1830.

== History ==
=== Pre-20th century ===
The Walsh area's earliest known inhabitants, from around the year 1000 until approximately 300–350 years later, were the Algonquin nation. They were noted flint-workers and evidence of their skill in crafting arrowheads is still to be found in open worked field areas surrounding the village. The next wave of inhabitants were the Attawandaron nation, the Neutrals, who occupied the region from about 1350 until their absorption by the Iroquois in the year 1651. The last significant native nation to occupy the area was the Mississaugas.

The first Caucasian settlers in Charlotteville were the United Empire Loyalist settlers from just prior to the year 1800. Charlotteville was named after Charlotte of Mecklenburg-Strelitz, Britain's queen at the time. Charlotteville, roughly 100 square miles was surveyed by the Walsh/Welch family, with the work completed by 1805. The township was laid out, nine miles wide, back from the nominal shoreline of Lake Erie. On a 180-chain spacing (about four kilometres) between the two town lines roads were the two quarter line roads and the centre line road, now known as the Turkey Point road, running northwards, from Turkey Point, through Charlotteville Centre and beyond. Perpendicular to the line roads was a series of twelve concession roads, spaced 70 chains apart (about 1.5 kilometres), from the Lake Erie shore, back to the north boundary. The Township of Charlotteville became an incorporated municipality within the County of Norfolk, in 1850.

Because of its convenient central location, Charlotteville Centre, now known as Walsh, was designated the administrative centre. The Township Hall building, constructed at a cost of $700 in 1868 still stands. In later years, the township seat administrative function was relocated to the larger village of Vittoria, four miles to the southeast. Walsh developed as a community centre and gathering place during the first half of the nineteenth century after Charlotteville Township was surveyed. Located at the intersection of the middle of five north–south "line roads" and the sixth of twelve west–east concession roads made it a logical central focus point for the growing township.

Railway service once provided freight and passenger service at a railway junction, three concessions to the south, known as Walsh Station (42.732072°N 80.362844°W) from its inception in 1886 by the South Norfolk Railway until all service was terminated in 1962 by the Canadian National Railways. Canadian National removed the railway tracks three years later in 1965.

The proximity to Young's Creek with a water flow to power flour and lumber mills was an added advantage favouring the location. From a geographical perspective, Young's Creek originates about four kilometers northwest of the village and passes through Walsh, and then Vittoria, before discharging into Lake Erie, 11 kilometres or 6.8 miles away in Port Ryerse. This creek would eventually provide water to nearby Vitorria in addition to Greens Corners, Port Ryerse, Normandale, Turkey Point, St. Williams and Port Rowan.

=== 20th century ===
With the escalation of gasoline consumption after the Great Depression, the number of low volume rural gasoline retailers peaked in the late 1950s. Gas prices reached 5.5 cents a litre by 1959 due to the low fuel taxes and surplus of oil from the Middle East during that era. At that time, Walsh had three such businesses. Colwell, General Merchant, described more fully below, was located on the northwest corner of the main intersection and sold Supertest products. Facing them, across the road, on the northeast corner was another general store, Earle's Grocery, that sold Reliance products. Ironically, Supertest and Reliance were of the same corporate ownership but operated as separate companies. Half a block to the south of Earle's was the village's only full scope service station, Engell's Walsh Garage that sold Texaco products. At Walsh Station located five kilometers to the south, Cherwaty's Service sold Fina products during the early years of his business. He would keep the business selling Petro-Canada products before dying in 2008 at the Leisure World in Brantford.

The local gasoline retailers have all gone out of business. The gas station at the general store belonging to the parents of local petroliana collector Alex Colwell handled Supertest products for oil and automobile gasoline. Supertest was an all-Canadian company that operated until being bought out by BP Canada in the 1970s (which was bought out by Petro-Canada in 1983).

Natural gas production is found throughout the Walsh area; this production spreads as fast east as Vittoria and as far west as Jericho and Silver Hill. More than 40,000 acres or 1.7×10^{9} square feet of petroleum and mineral leases are within the boundaries of Walsh along with the nearby communities of Walsingham and Houghton. Approximately 85 businesses and residences are served by this company through a special agreement with Union Gas.

In 2001, Haldimand-Norfolk was dissolved into two separate single-tier counties. Walsh became part of the newly formed County of Norfolk.

== Donnybrook Fair ==
An annual fair held in the hamlet called the Donnybrook Fair attracts kids and adults from the area in the middle of September.

It has been held since 1857, with the fair growing in size and quality every year. Children who attend school within the immediate vicinity are allowed to enter any artwork that they produced themselves in addition to their own crafts and agriculture-related artifacts. They are typically between the ages of 5 and 13. Homeschooled children may also enter the contests. In the 2011 edition of the Donnybrook Fair, these local students have managed to win $1346 in tax-free cash. This monetary award encourages children to save up for higher education opportunities. The short-term effects of the award system encourages children to work on their innovative spirit and improve their work ethics. Although the winner of the Donnybrook Fair demolition derby is no longer assured a spot in the Norfolk County Fair version of the event, the prize money keeps increasing and the event is done over a traditional dirt track. Fundraising for the Donnybrook Fair involves a Victoria Day brunch, an annual spring barbecue, and numerous raffles.

== Notable people ==
- Annaleise Carr, the youngest person to swim across Lake Ontario
- Egerton Ryerson, Methodist minister, educator, politician, and public education advocate in early Ontario history
- Joseph Ryerson, soldier, United Empire Loyalist and father of Egerton
- David Tisdale, Canadian politician
- Aquila Walsh, Canadian civil engineer, politician, and civil servant
- William L. Walsh, Canadian lawyer and judge

== Climate ==
Throughout the history of the hamlet, Walsh has seen temperatures as cold as −10.2 °C (13.6 °F) and as hot as 26.3 °C (79.3 °F). Summers have typically been around 20 °C (68 °F) for most of Walsh's history. Winter activities are possible between the months of December and March; although recent years have made March and sometimes December too mild for the snow to form. Even during the coldest years, no snow-related activities are possible between April and November.

The winter of 1975 was the only unusually mild winter in the region from 1897 to 1977. From the late 1990s onwards, winters became more mild due to changes in climate brought on by global warming. Walsh traditionally belongs to the humid continental climate zone, even with the recent mild winters and warmer dry summers. As in all communities, towns and cities throughout the world, global warming due to human industrial activity has drastically altered the climate of Walsh over the decades.

The warmest summers that Walsh has witnessed occurred in 1998, 2003, 2005, 2006, 2007, 2009 (with the exception of the month of July), 2010, 2012, 2013, 2014, 2015 and 2016.

Should the sea levels rise by 60 metres or 200 feet, Walsh is not located close enough to salt water to be affected directly by flooding. However, it would suffer indirectly from droughts due to the displacement of available freshwater resources and would have to rely on desalinated salt water piped in from hundreds of miles away. Many major cities near salt water already pipe in their water from freshwater sources hundreds of miles away like Los Angeles; which is located in the middle of a desert.

Climate data for Walsh, Ontario
Month	Jan	Feb	Mar	Apr	May	Jun	Jul	Aug	Sep	Oct	Nov	Dec	Year
Record high °C (°F)	13 (55)	19 (66)	25 (77)	26 (79)	32 (90)	33 (91)	34 (93)	35 (95)	31 (88)	27 (81)	19 (66)	19 (66)	35 (95)
Mean daily maximum °C (°F)	0 (32)	3 (37)	7 (45)	13 (55)	22 (72)	25 (77)	27 (81)	23 (73)	22 (72)	16 (61)	8 (46)	2 (36)	27 (81)
Mean daily minimum °C (°F)	−8 (18)	−5 (23)	−3 (27)	2 (36)	9 (48)	13 (55)	15 (59)	14 (57)	11 (52)	5 (41)	0 (32)	−6 (21)	−8 (18)
Record low °C (°F)	−25 (−13)	−23 (−9)	−22 (−8)	−6 (21)	0 (32)	0 (32)	5 (41)	5 (41)	0 (32)	−4 (25)	−14 (7)	−22 (−8)	−25 (−13)
Average precipitation mm (inches)	70 (2.8)	59 (2.3)	83 (3.3)	85 (3.3)	83 (3.3)	83 (3.3)	86 (3.4)	86 (3.4)	98 (3.9)	84 (3.3)	84 (3.3)	100 (3.9)	1,010 (39.8)
Average rainfall mm (inches)	37 (1.5)	30 (1.2)	62 (2.4)	80 (3.1)	84 (3.3)	83 (3.3)	86 (3.4)	86 (3.4)	98 (3.9)	84 (3.3)	91 (3.6)	58 (2.3)	877 (34.5)
Average snowfall cm (inches)	33 (13)	30 (12)	21 (8.3)	6 (2.4)	0 (0)	0 (0)	0 (0)	0 (0)	0 (0)	0.5 (0.2)	9 (3.5)	34 (13)	133 (52)
Source: Environment Canada

Views of Walsh, Ontario
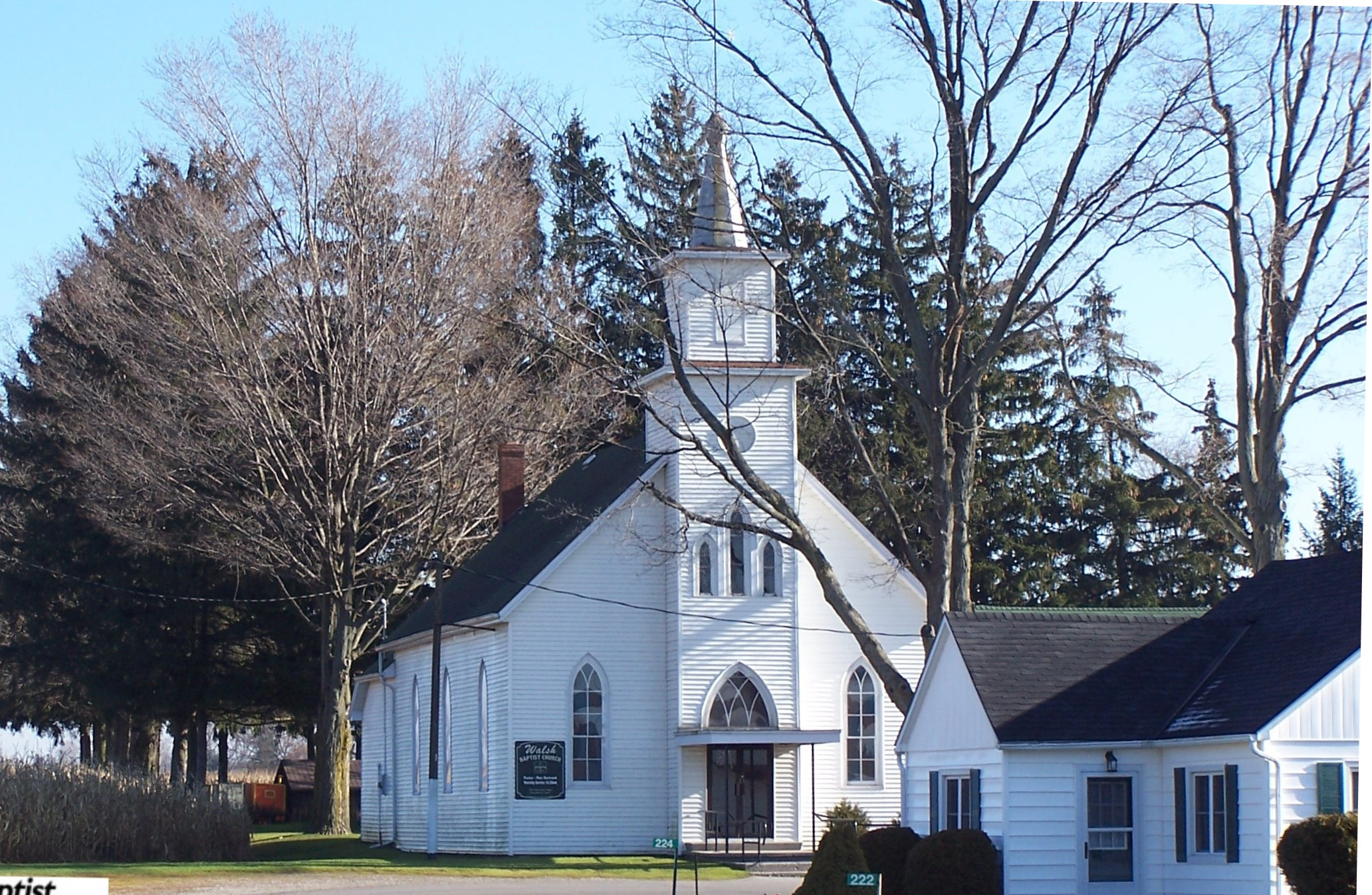
Walsh Baptist Church; established 1876

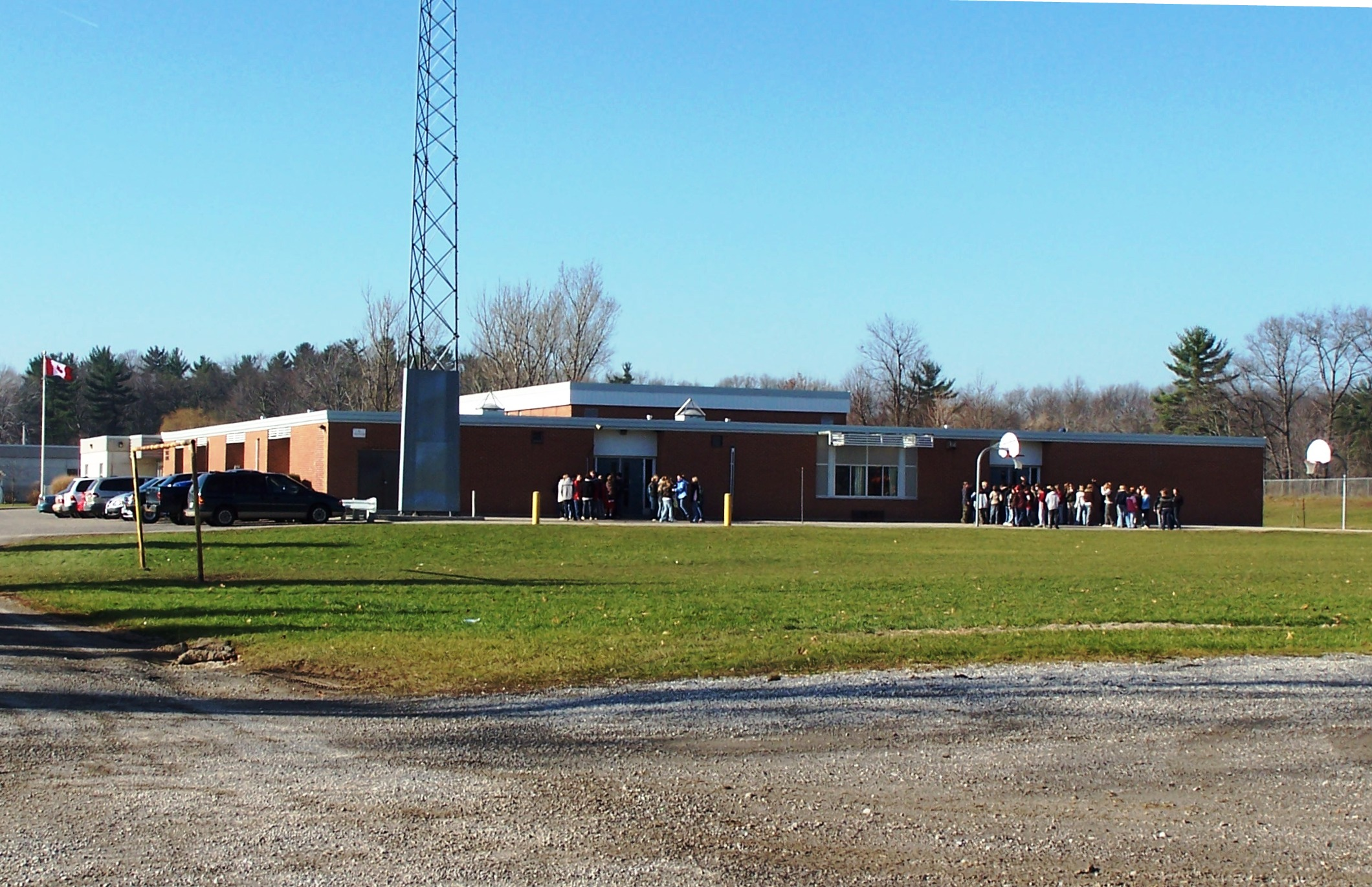
Walsh Area Public School; opened March 1960 (photo taken November 2006)

St. Michael’s Elementary School; opened January 1961

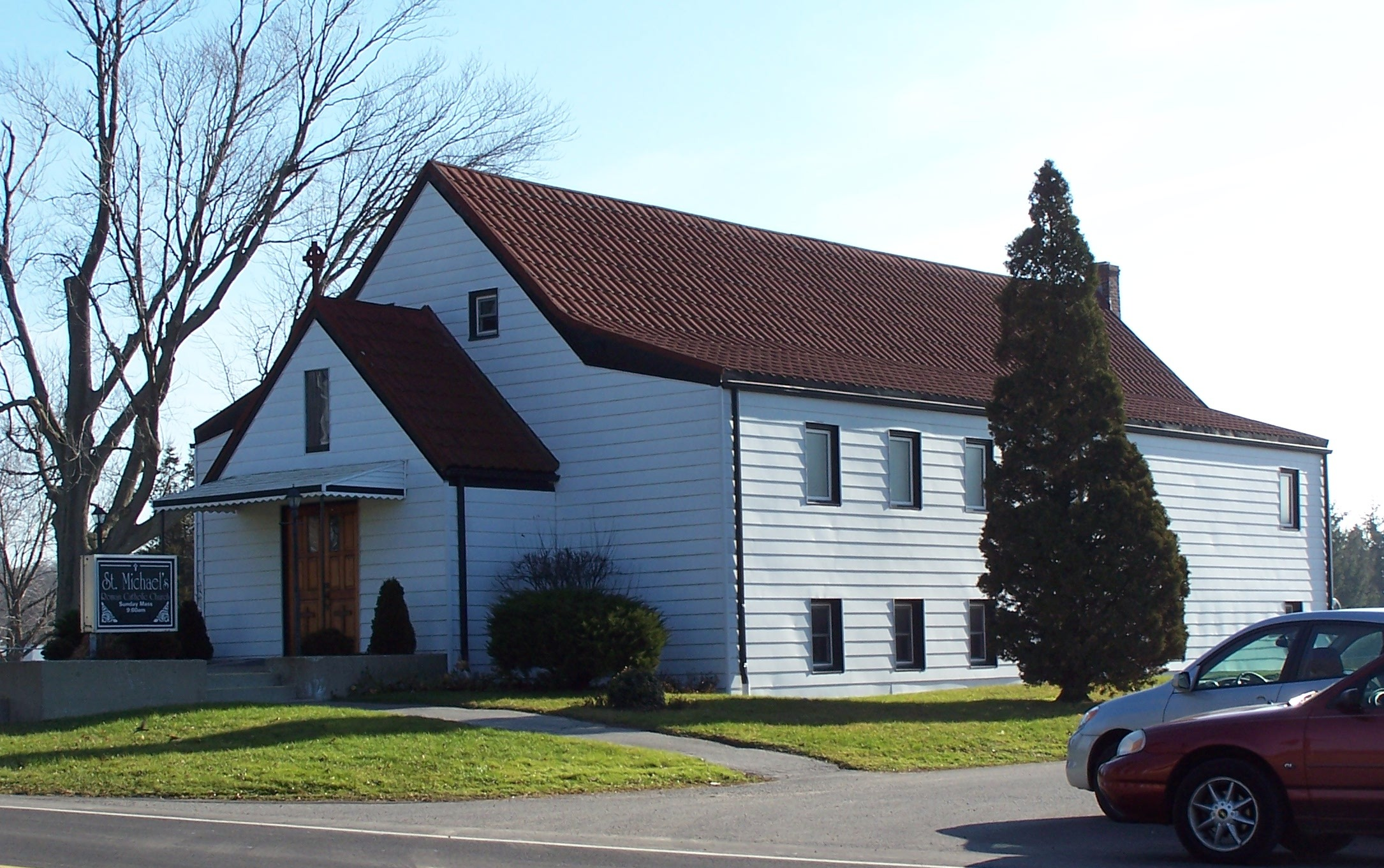
St. Michael’s Catholic Church; established 1947

Charlotteville Methodist Church; erected 1856 and demolished 1962

Walsh Public School SS#11; opened 1908 and closed March 1960

Tisdale Public School SS#12; opened 1884 and closed March 1960

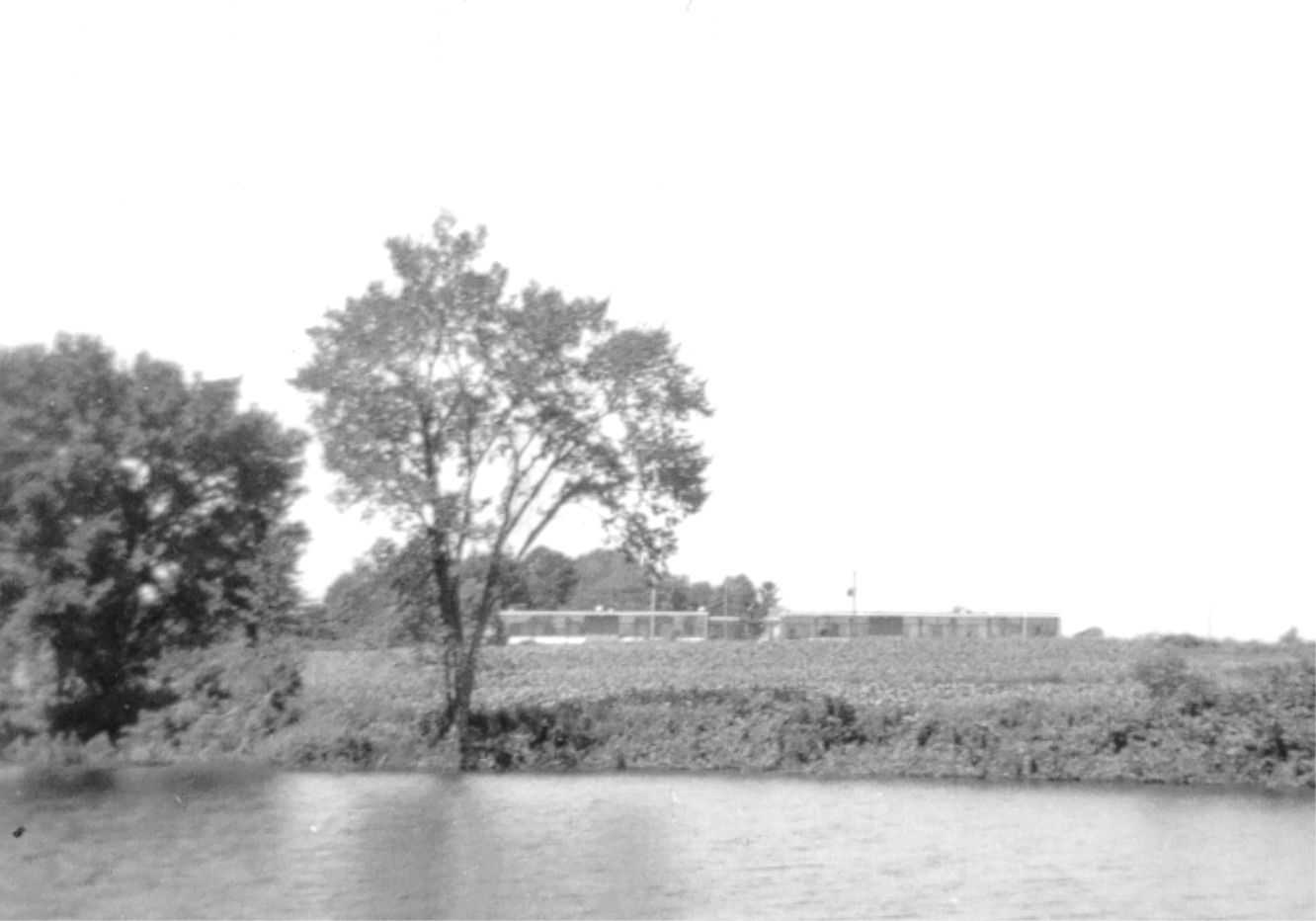
Walsh Area Public School; viewed across restored Mill Pond on Young's Creek (summer of 1963)

Township Board of Works five-bay service garage constructed in Walsh in 1950

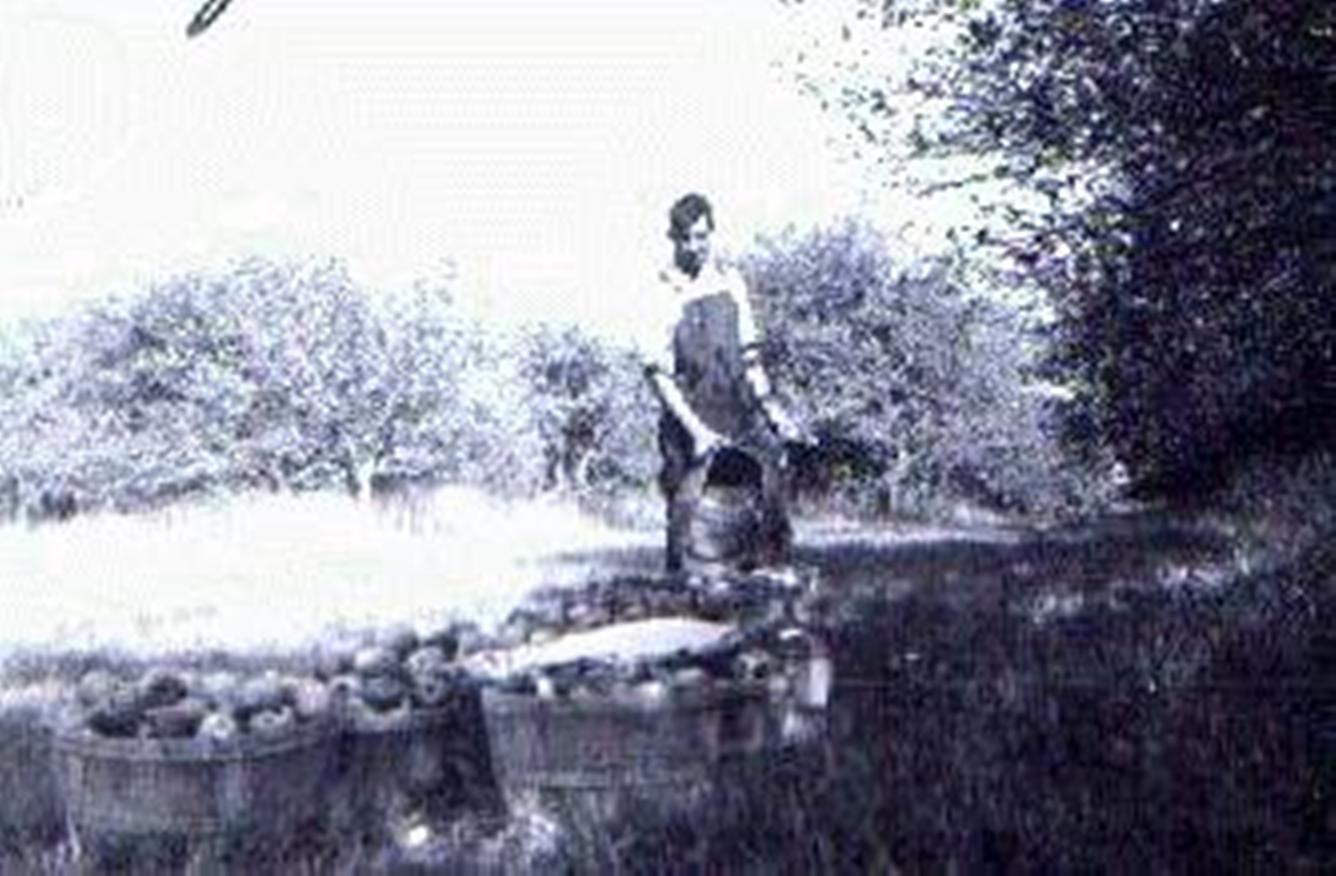
Apple growing was prevalent around Walsh since the 1920s. This scene from 1946 depicts a traditional harvest.

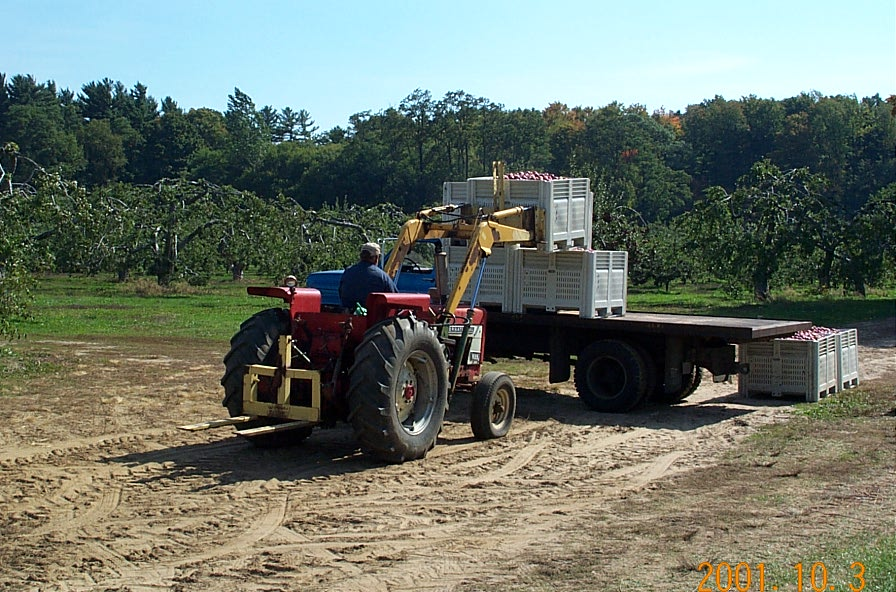
Apple harvesting by 2002 had become much more mechanized

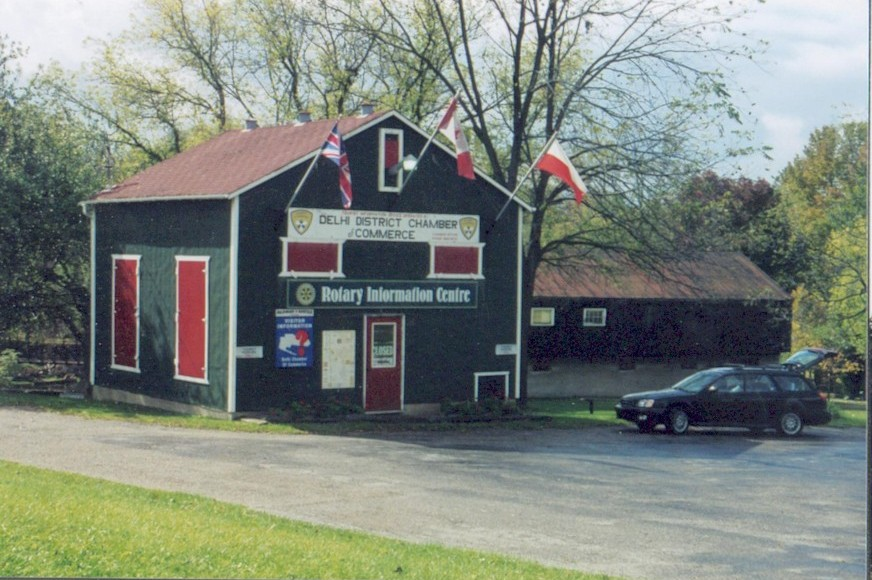
Tobacco kilns, like this one in nearby Delhi, dot the local landscape after more than 60 years as a major cash crop.

Fishing at the old mill pond on Young’s Creek; photo taken spring 1958.

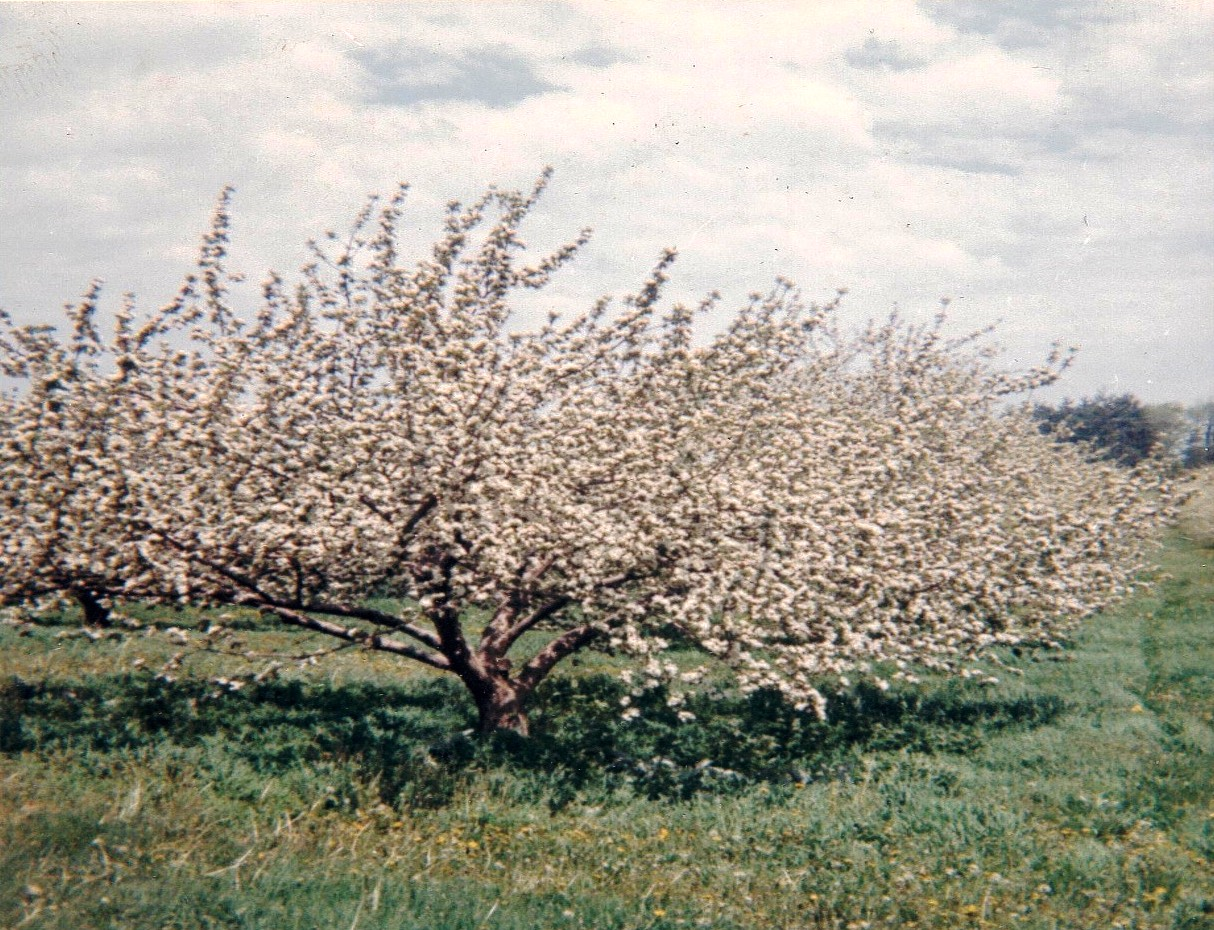
Apple trees in blossom near Walsh

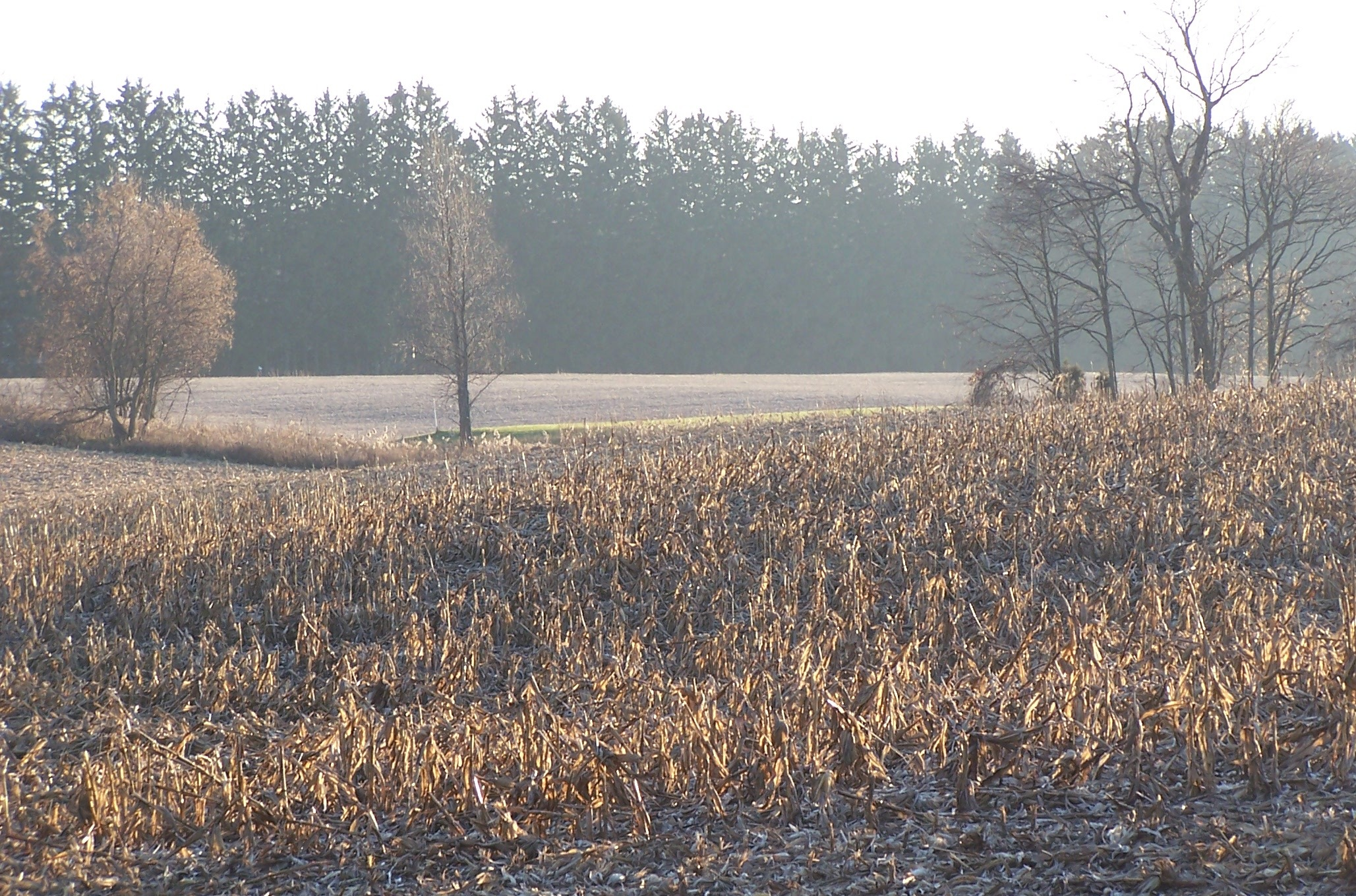
Corn field near Walsh after picking

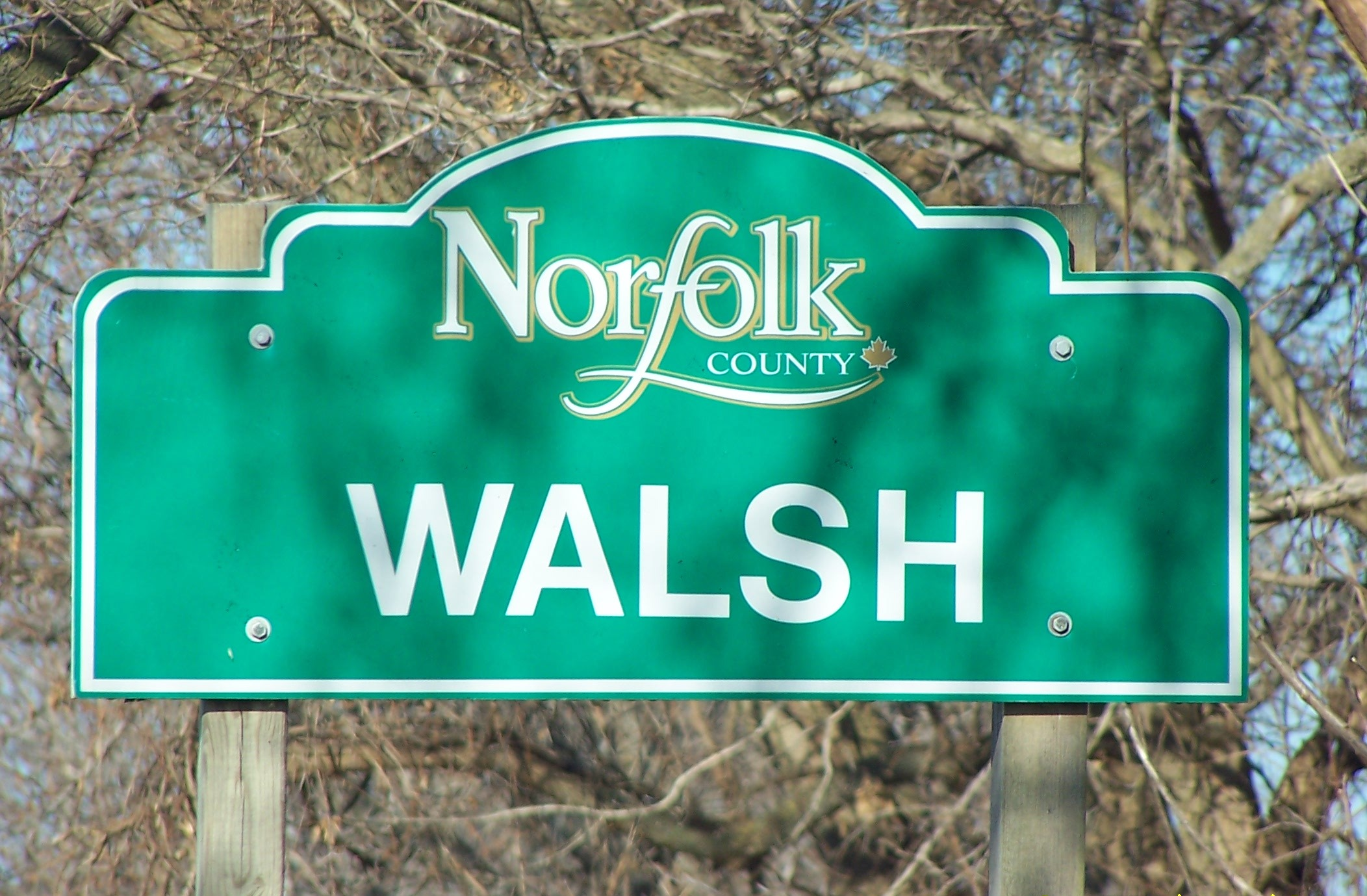
Walsh entrance sign after re-establishment of Norfolk County in 2001.

== See also ==
- List of townships in Ontario
- Royal eponyms in Canada
