= Hillcrest, Norfolk County, Ontario =

Community of Norfolk County, Ontario, Canada

Hillcrest, Ontario
- Unincorporated Hamlet in Norfolk County
- Location of Hillcrest in Ontario
- Coordinates: 42°49′49″N 80°20′11″W
- Country: Canada
- Province: Ontario
- Amalgamated into Norfolk County: 2001 (Single-tier municipality)

Government
  - Mayor: Kristal Chopp
  - Governing Body: The Council of The Corporation of Norfolk County
  - MPs: Diane Finley (Con)
  - MPPs: Toby Barrett (PC)
- Elevation: 224 m (735 ft)
- Time zone: UTC-5 (EST)
  - Summer (DST): UTC-4 (EDT)
- Forward sortation area: N3Y
- Area codes: 519 and 226
- Website: www.norfolkcounty.ca

Hillcrest is a hamlet in Norfolk County, Ontario, Canada that is in between Bill's Corners and the town of Simcoe.

Hillcrest's earliest known inhabitants, from around the year 1000 until approximately 300–350 years later, were the Algonquin nation. They were noted flint-workers and evidence of their skill in crafting arrowheads is still to be found in open worked field areas surrounding the village. The next wave of inhabitants were the Attawandaron nation, the Neutrals, who occupied the region from about 1350 until their absorption by the Iroquois in the year 1651. The last significant native nation to occupy the area was the Mississaugas.

In 2001, Haldimand-Norfolk was dissolved into two separate single-tier counties. Hillcrest became part of the newly formed County of Norfolk.

== Summary ==
A soccer field is found within the boundaries of the community; it received a $15,000 stimulus package from the Simcoe Lions Club on April 7, 2013. Builders had a plan to use this money for a pavilion in order to enhance property values and to encourage people to move to the community. Youth leagues generally use the field for its state of the art bleachers and close proximity to residential neighbourhoods. Adult amateur leagues typically do not use this field; with the exception of the Western Ontario Soccer League. Individuals and families are granted unrestricted access to use the soccer field during the autumn months. However, the local climate prevents its use in the winter months due to ice accumulating in the bleachers and heavy snow piling up into the soccer field.

During the 1950s and 1960s, Hillcrest was the home of a dance club that played country and western tunes for people to do slow dances to.

The nearest elementary school is Elgin Avenue Public School, the nearest secular high school is Simcoe Composite School, and the nearest faith-based high school is Holy Trinity Catholic High School. The hamlet is located southeast of Nixon and northwest of Port Dover and is centred on Hillcrest Road which is the site of the former Norfolk Board of Education building. This road intersects with Ontario Highway 3 and Regional Road 1 while in Hillcrest. Hillcrest is also the home of a charity which helps people acquire wheelchairs called the Who Did It Club which was founded by war veterans and is currently maintained by civilian volunteers from the local area.

During the winter months (late November through early April), Hillcrest becomes a haven for snowmobile users. Religious needs for this community are provided either by the Simcoe United Church or the nearby Kingdom Hall for Jehovah's Witnesses (although non-members are welcome as pupils for weekly service). The most common last names found in this community are Coates, Bezzo, and Holmes.

=== Economy ===
Agriculture is the main industry even though it has been affected by the unpredictable precipitation patterns that have occurred from 2001 to the present day. Most of the farming in the area is tobacco farming despite pleas by local residents to diversify the tobacco belt into other industries with the changing Canadian economy and the declining number of smokers in Canada. The summer of 2009 was an usually cool and wet year for agriculture in Hillcrest as the torrential rains caused the smallest tobacco harvest in the community's history.

=== Media ===
Most residents in this community get their television through Shaw Direct, Bell Satellite TV or over-the-air through either an indoor antenna or an outdoor antenna.

Due to geographic constraints and the waning nature of over-the-air television, only one channel (CIII-DT) can be reliably received at all times. Four over-the-air channels (CKCO-DT, CICO-DT, CITY-DT, and CITS-DT) can be picked up semi-reliably while at least eight other channels can only be picked up on clear sunny days.
