= Brant County Board of Education =

School district in Ontario, Canada

The Brant County Board of Education is a former school district in the Canadian province of Ontario. In the late 1990s, it was amalgamated with the Norfolk County Board of Education and the Haldimand County Board of Education to create the Grand Erie District School Board.
