= Frank Walsh (disambiguation) =

Frank Walsh (1897–1968) was the premier of South Australia.

Frank or Francis Walsh may also refer to:

- Frank Walsh (golfer) (1902–1992), American professional golfer
- Frank Walsh (rugby union) (born 1976), Canadian rugby union prop
- Frank B. Walsh (1895–1978), Canadian-American ophthalmologist
- Frank P. Walsh (1864–1939), American attorney and labor expert
- Frank S. Walsh (born 1953), British neuroscientist
- Francis Leigh Walsh (1789–1884), Canadian political figure
- Frank Walsh (baseball umpire) (1905–1985), American baseball umpire
- Frankie Walsh (1936–2012), Irish hurler

== See also ==
- Francis Walsh (disambiguation)
- Frank Walshe (1904–1962), Australian rules footballer
- Francis Walshe (1885–1973), British neurologist
- Fran Walsh (born 1959), female screenwriter
