= Port Dover Composite School =

Location
- Box 729, 713 St. George Street; Port Dover, Ontario, N0A 1N0; Canada; 42.791039°N 80.211933°W

Information
- Motto: Lux Ex Umbra (Light In Darkness)
- Religious affiliation: Secular
- Founded: 1962
- School board: Grand Erie District School Board
- School number: 935964
- Principal: Marcus Dulmage
- Grades: 7–12 (formerly 9–13)
- Enrollment: 44 (2012)
- Language: English
- Area: Port Dover and Area
- Colours: Green and White
- Team name: Lakers
- Website: granderie.ca/pdcs/

Port Dover Composite School (PDCS) was a public middle and high school located in Port Dover, Ontario, Canada. Shortly after closure, PDCS was converted into an elementary school called Lakewood Public School Students here typically lived south of Simcoe, northeast of Turkey Point and southwest of Jarvis.

PDCS had a well established theatre arts program which allowed students to take drama in Grades 9 and 10, and then go on to the unique Theatre Co-op Program. This program ran at the community's Lighthouse Festival Theatre and each year culminated in a class-directed and produced production. In 2011, the class performed the play Sticks and Stones. In 2010, the school's production of The Insanity of Mary Girard was one of three plays from the district festival at the Lighthouse Theatre to go on to the regional festival in Hamilton. In 2011 the school's play The Chronicles of Jane, Book Seven was also selected to represent the district at the regional festival, again held in Hamilton.

== School closure ==
Port Dover Composite School was originally given the option of remaining open until September 2013; although it has been officially declared that this school will be closed by January 31, 2013. Students who have not already transferred to Simcoe Composite School had to become permanent students there for the duration of their high school "career." Several small groups of Port Dover Composite School students had taken small tours around the Simcoe Composite School campus on November 29, 2012, in order to start the transition from into a high school outside their own community.

Had the traditional Norfolk County high school boundaries been strictly enforced as it been in the past, the students would have filled 78% of the school's total capacity. The worst possible outcome for PDCS coming into the 2012–13 school year was to have classes until the end of January 2013 with each class having less than six students attending, before closing the high school permanently. This has already been achieved despite adding wi-fi Internet access and Smart Boards in an attempt to lure more teenagers into attending PDCS. Most of the students who have attended Port Dover Composite School in the previous (2011–12) school year have left in a sudden "exodus" to attend Simcoe Composite School in the search of better school programs. Only 14 teachers have remained at the high school as of the beginning of the 2012–13 school year.

In additional, almost all athletic teams have been eliminated in favor of a strict academic approach to schooling. Traditional favorites like high school football and basketball have been scrapped; with a bye given to opponents who were supposed to play against PDCS this year due to a lack of manpower needed to operate a football or girls' basketball team. Some of the less demanding sports like volleyball (for grades 11 and 12) had been given authorization to compete by the school's athletics department; with 25% of the students on the team. Absenteeism was virtually non-existent in the final year of school operations.

Due to a declining youth population in the Port Dover area, the school was officially closed on January 31, 2013. Compared to 2001, there are 1800 fewer children and young people living in the vicinity of Port Dover Public School. Academic programs in Valley Heights Secondary School and Delhi District Secondary School have been beefed up; hoping to attract former PDCS students to those schools.

== Future of Norfolk County schools ==
While most schools under the governmental school system (Grand Erie District School Board) will remain open in the foreseeable future, they will see more than 1000 empty seats in their classes by 2017. Everything from homeschooling to the rapidly aging local population to the increasing popularity of virtual high schools on the Internet has stunted the ability of the government-funded secular high schools to maintain full classrooms in recent years. Waterford District High School may once again face serious threats of closure by 2017 due to government cutbacks and declining enrolment.

If attendance continues to decline due to aging and the abandonment of traditional school settings for "safe" online learning environments, another solution would be to close down Simcoe Composite School and Waterford District High School in favor of a new secular high school spanning 15 acres or 650,000 square feet somewhere in Norfolk County. Both Valley Heights Secondary School and Delhi District High School have the government funding and student enrolment numbers needed to remain open as separate institutions for an indefinite period of time.

The gradual aging of the local population will eventually eradicate the young people from the communities of Norfolk County. Port Dover will have lost 3,600 children and young people between the years 2001 and 2023 due to the diminishing youth demographics of Norfolk County. All public secondary schools that currently serve Norfolk County students will eventually have to be converted into "Internet-only" establishments. These establishments would allow anyone between the ages of 14 and 21 with a broadband Internet connection and fluency in the English language to "attend" a high school in Norfolk County, Ontario, Canada. The core curriculum would be taught for students in grade 9 through grade 12 in addition to Canadian culture, laws, geography, and history; helping people acquire a Canadian-style secondary school education and facilitating their way to acquiring Canadian citizenship.

== See also ==
- Education in Ontario
- List of secondary schools in Ontario
