= Norfolk Board of Education =

Defunct school board in Southern Ontario, Canada

Location
- Simcoe, Ontario Nixon, Delhi, Port Dover, Langton, Walsh, Simcoe, Lynedoch, St. Williams Canada
- Coordinates: 42.795212°N 80.308728°W

District information
- Chair of the board: Leon DeWaele
- Schools: 21
- District ID: NBE

Students and staff
- Students: 10000+

Other information
- Website: www.norfolk.edu.on.ca

The Norfolk Board of Education (NBE) is a former school district in Norfolk County, Ontario, which merged into the Grand Erie District School Board (known as English-language Public District School Board No. 23 until the 1999–2000 school year).

This defunct school board building is located in the hamlet of Hillcrest, Ontario, Canada on 173 Hillcrest Road South. Government cutbacks eventually forced the school board to amalgamate with the Haldimand Board of Education and the Brant District Board of Education in 1996.

== Schools served ==
=== Elementary ===
- Bloomsburg Public School*
- Boston Public School*
- Courtland Public School*
- Delhi Public School*
- Doan's Hollow Public School
- Doverwood Public School
- Elgin Avenue Public School*
- Houghton Public School*
- Langton Public School*
- Nixon Public School
- North Public School
- Port Dover Public School
- Port Rowan Public School*
- Port Ryerse School
- Simcoe Lions School
- South Public School
- Teeterville Public School
- Townsend Central Public School
- Walsingham Public School
- Walsh Public School* (originally known as Walsh Area Public School)
- Waterford Public School - Ada B. Massecar Campus, (W.F. Hewitt Campus closed)
- West Lynn Public School*

* signifies that the school is still active

=== Secondary ===
- Delhi District Secondary School
- Simcoe Composite School
- Valley Heights Secondary School
- Waterford District High School
- Port Dover Composite School (no longer active)

== Defunct schools ==
=== Doan's Hollow Public School ===
Doan's Hollow Public School is a defunct public elementary school that existed from the early 20th century until circa 1980. Red Kelly attended Doan's Hollow Public School during the 1930s.

=== Lynedoch Public School ===
Lynedoch Public School is a defunct elementary school in the hamlet of Lynedoch, Ontario, Canada which taught students from kindergarten to the second grade starting in the year 1881. This school was considered to be a feeder school to Walsh Public School.

=== Nixon Public School ===
Nixon Public School was an elementary school that was located in Nixon. that started out as a one room schoolhouse in the mid to late 19th century. During the 1950s, the school was moved to a centralized building; both of these buildings were located in the hamlet of Nixon and across the street from each other. The one-room schoolhouse was sold to become a private residence, and Nixon Public School became a centralized school until it was closed in September 2001 due to cutbacks in education spending.

=== North Public School ===
North Public School is a defunct elementary school in Simcoe, Ontario, Canada that taught children from Kindergarten to sixth grade. This school was once considered a feeder school to Elgin Avenue Public School.

=== Port Dover Composite School ===
Port Dover Composite School (PDCS) was a public middle and high school located in Port Dover, Ontario, Canada. Shortly after closure, PDCS was converted into an elementary school called Lakewood Public School.

PDCS had a well-established theatre arts program which allowed students to take drama in Grades 9 and 10 and then go on to the unique Theatre Co-op Program. This program ran at the community's Lighthouse Festival Theatre and each year culminated in a class-directed and produced production. In 2011, the class performed the play Sticks and Stones. In addition to its drama classes, the school has a long tradition of excellence at the prestigious Sears Drama Festival. In 2010, the school's production of The Insanity of Mary Girard was one of three plays from the district festival at the Lighthouse Theatre to go on to the regional festival in Hamilton. In 2011 the school's play The Chronicles of Jane, Book Seven was also selected to represent the district at the regional festival, again held in Hamilton.

Port Dover Composite School was originally given the option of remaining open until September 2013; although it has been officially declared that this school will be closed by January 31, 2013. Students who have not already transferred to Simcoe Composite School had to become permanent students there for the duration of their high school "career." Several small groups of Port Dover Composite School students had taken small tours around the Simcoe Composite School campus on November 29, 2012, in order to start the transition from into a high school outside their own community.

Had the traditional Norfolk County high school boundaries been strictly enforced as it been in the past, the students would have filled 78% of the school's total capacity. The worst possible outcome for PDCS coming into the 2012–13 school year was to have classes until the end of January 2013 with each class having less than six students attending, before closing the high school permanently. This has already been achieved despite adding wi-fi Internet access and Smart Boards in an attempt to lure more teenagers into attending PDCS. Most of the students who have attended Port Dover Composite School in the previous (2011–12) school year have left in a sudden "exodus" to attend Simcoe Composite School in the search of better school programs. Only 14 teachers have remained at the high school as of the beginning of the 2012–13 school year.

In addition, almost all athletic teams have been eliminated in favor of a strictly academic approach to schooling. Traditional favorites like high school football and basketball have been scrapped; with a bye given to opponents who were supposed to play against PDCS this year due to a lack of manpower needed to operate a football or girls' basketball team. Some of the less demanding sports like volleyball (for grades 11 and 12) had been given the authorization to compete by the school's athletics department; with 25% of the students on the team. Absenteeism was virtually non-existent in the final year of school operations.

Due to a declining youth population in the Port Dover area, the school was officially closed on January 31, 2013. Compared to 2001, there are 1800 fewer children and young people living in the vicinity of Port Dover Public School. Academic programs in Valley Heights Secondary School and Delhi District Secondary School have been beefed up; hoping to attract former PDCS students to those schools.

=== Port Ryerse School ===
Port Ryerse School is a defunct elementary school that was located in Port Ryerse. The school operated from the year 1830 until the 1950s when it was finally closed by the Norfolk Board of Education due to funding issues. Both Caucasian and African-Canadian students were photographed attending the school in the year 1898.

=== Simcoe Lions School ===
The Simcoe Lions School was operated as a special elementary school for the mentally challenged by the Simcoe Lions Club from 1957 until the 1970s.

=== South Public School ===
South Public School is also a defunct elementary school in Simcoe, Ontario, Canada.

=== St. Williams Public School ===
St. Williams Public School is a defunct elementary school that was located in St. Williams, Ontario, Canada. It was closed due to funding cutbacks and declining enrolment in the year 2001 after participating in the Ice Cube project.
