= Francis Walsh =

Francis Walsh may refer to:

- Frank Walsh (Francis Henry Walsh, 1897–1968), Premier of South Australia
- Francis Leigh Walsh (1789–1884), Upper Canada politician
- Frank P. Walsh (Francis Patrick Walsh, 1864–1939), American lawyer
- Francis Walsh (bishop) (1901–1974), Roman Catholic bishop
- Walsh Intermediate School, or Francis Walsh Intermediate School, middle school in Connecticut

== See also ==
- Francis Walshe (1885–1973), neurologist
- Fran Walsh (born 1959), screenwriter
- Frank Walsh (disambiguation)
