= Thomas Welch =

Canadian judge (1742–1816)

Thomas Welch or Walsh (November 5, 1742 – July 2, 1816) was a surveyor and judge in Upper Canada.

He was born in the Province of Maryland in 1742, the son of Irish immigrants with roots in Wales. He studied in Philadelphia and served with the British Army during the Seven Years' War. He was appointed surveyor in Berks County, Pennsylvania; in 1769, he moved to Maryland. In 1778, he joined the Maryland Loyalists Battalion. He was taken prisoner by the Spanish at Pensacola, Florida and later released in New York City. He led a group of loyalists to New Brunswick; after five years, he returned to Maryland.

Unable to recover his property in the United States, he left for Upper Canada where land was available and settled in Lincoln County, where he was appointed deputy surveyor. In 1796, he was named the first land registrar in Norfolk County. He settled on a farm in Charlotteville Township. Welch served as a captain in the local militia. In 1800, he was named a district commissioner for the Court of King's Bench. In 1810, he was named judge in the district and surrogate courts. In the same year, his son, Francis Leigh Walsh, succeeded him as land registrar for Norfolk. Welch was also a member of the Freemasons.

He died in Charlotteville Township in 1816.

His grandson, Aquila Walsh, later became a member of the House of Commons of Canada and Welch's great-grandson, William L. Walsh, served as Lieutenant Governor of Alberta.
