= Hillcrest, Ontario =

Hillcrest, Ontario, may refer to:

- Hillcrest, a place in Prince Edward County, Ontario
- Hillcrest, Norfolk County, Ontario, a hamlet
