= North Park Collegiate and Vocational School =

Location
- 280 North Park Street; Brantford, Ontario, N3R 4L1; Canada; 43.168409°N 80.262036°W

Information
- School type: Public, high school
- Founded: 1959
- School board: Grand Erie District School Board
- School number: 930245
- Principal: Stephen Wills
- Grades: 9–12
- Enrollment: 1065 (2023–2024)
- Language: Canadian English+ Canadian French
- Colours: Green and Orange
- Mascot: Troy the Trojan
- Website: www.granderie.ca/schools/npcvs

North Park Collegiate and Vocational School is a public secondary school (High School) located in Brantford, Ontario, Canada, that offers academic courses to students in grades 9 through 12 as well as the Ontario French immersion program which is offered for all grades. This program will terminate after the 2025-2026 school year, when it moves to Brantford Collegiate Institute, another Grand Erie School.

== 2023 and 2025 Incident ==
On March 2, 2023, a lockdown event was held at North Park Collegiate in response to a potential weapons related threat.

On November 19, 2025, a lockdown event was held at North Park Collegiate due to an unwanted individual within the school. The event was out of an abundance of caution and the suspect has been charged with two counts of criminal harassment, no weapons were involved.

== See also ==
- Education in Ontario
- List of secondary schools in Ontario
