= Cayuga, Ontario =

Cayuga
- Unincorporated Community
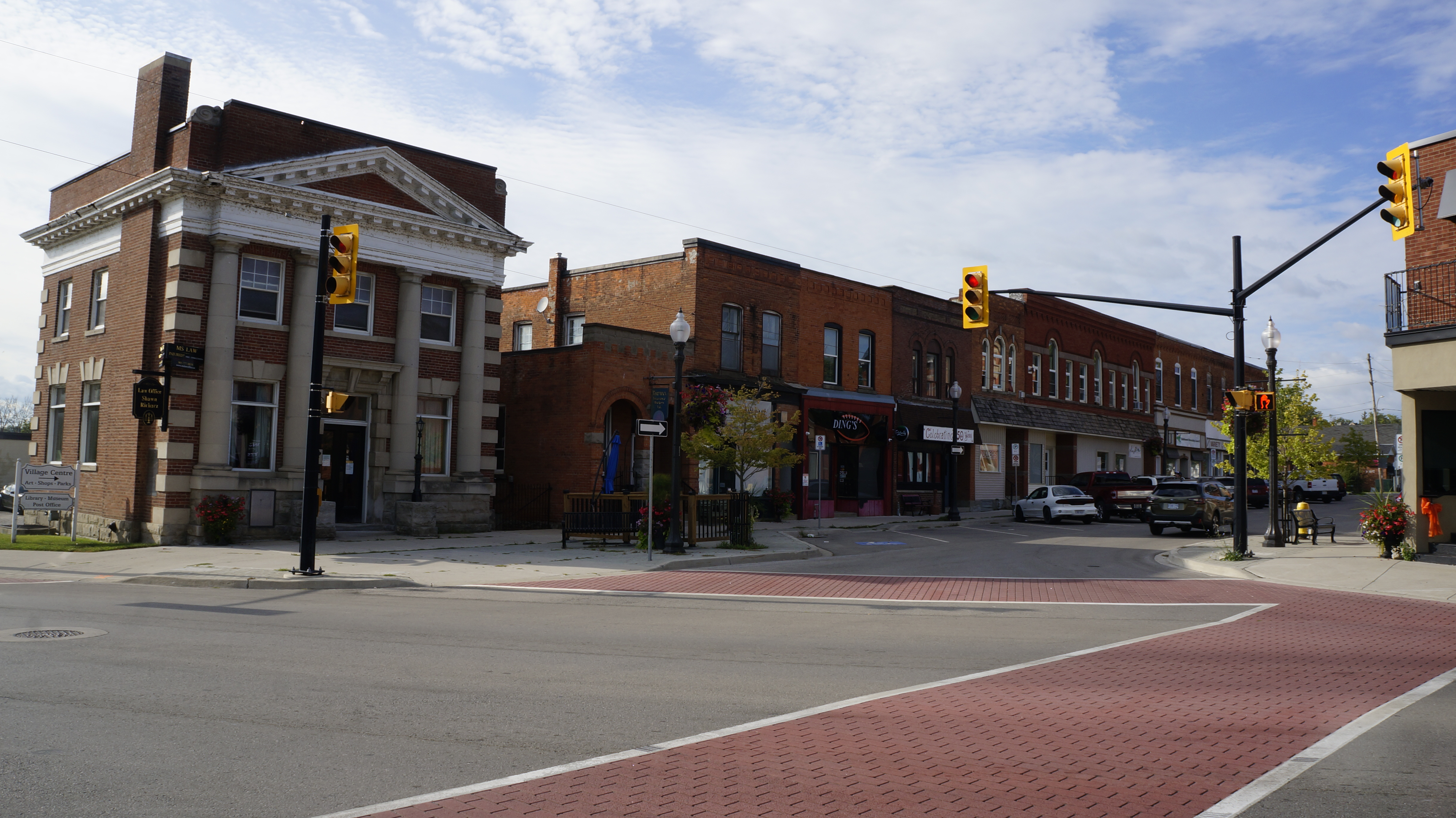

- Location within Ontario Location within Canada
- Coordinates: 42°57′01.4″N 79°51′20.9″W
- Country: Canada
- Province: Ontario
- County: Haldimand

Government
  - Mayor of Haldimand: Shelley Ann Bentley
  - Governing body: The Council of the Corporation of Haldimand County
  - Ward 2 (Cayuga) Councillor: John Metcalfe
  - MP: Leslyn Lewis (Conservative)
  - MPP: Bobbi Ann Brady (Independent)

Area
  - Land: 2.13 km^{2} (0.82 sq mi)
- Elevation: 190 m (620 ft)

Population (2021)
  - Total: 1,720
  - Density: 806.6/km^{2} (2,089/sq mi)
- Demonym: Cayugan
- Time zone: UTC−05:00 (EST)
  - Summer (DST): UTC−04:00 (EDT)
- Forward sortation area: N0A
- Area codes: 905, 289, 365

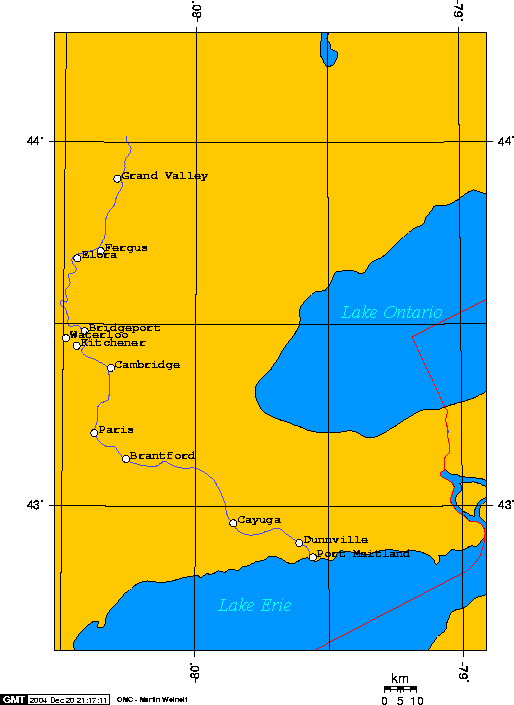
Grand River, Ontario

Cayuga (/keɪˈjuːɡə/ kay-YOO-gə) is an unincorporated community and county seat of Haldimand County, Ontario, Canada located at the intersection of Highway 3 and Munsee Street and along the Grand River. Cayuga is about a 20-minute drive from Lake Erie and 30 minutes south of Hamilton and 115 minutes south of Toronto and consequently it has some cottages and recreational properties in the area. In the past, there was some light industry. It has the local district detachment for the Ontario Provincial Police. It is also uniquely located among larger communities on both the American and Canadian sides of the border boasting television reception from Toronto, Buffalo, New York, Hamilton, Kitchener and Erie, Pennsylvania.

== History ==
Cayuga was incorporated as a village in 1859 and became the county seat for Haldimand County because of its central location. It is named after the Cayuga, one of the Six Nations of the Grand River Natives who were awarded land in the area for siding with the British in the American Revolution.

As the county seat, it is the location of the Court House, jail and a museum. In the late 18th century and early 19th century, public hangings were held in the courtyard and the prisoners buried on site. The Highway 3 bridge over the Grand River (Cayuga Bridge) was a very well recognized bridge over the Grand River and was commonly used as a symbol of Haldimand County and the Grand River. For example, the same bridge had been used in a movie that commemorated Terry Fox. That bridge no longer remains a symbol of the Grand River and Haldimand County as it was replaced in the summer of 2014 with a concrete bridge.

The village's population grew to about 2,500 in the mid-19th century because the Grand River was an important commercial route. There were locks constructed at Indiana just north of Cayuga. However, when the Welland Canal was completed, the Grand became an obsolete route. Further, an impassable dam was built downriver from Cayuga at Dunnville. Although originally part of the Welland Canal, the purpose of the dam and a canal at Port Maitland is to keep the level of the Welland Canal consistent. Presently the population of Cayuga has recovered to approximately 1,500 after having been around 1,000 for almost a century.

In 1974, Cayuga was amalgamated with the villages of Hagersville and Caledonia and the townships of Oneida, Seneca, North Cayuga, South Cayuga, parts of Rainham and Walpole to form the town of Haldimand. Despite nearby Caledonia being the largest community in the town, the town hall was located in Cayuga because of its central location. In 2001, Haldimand, Dunnville and half of Nanticoke were consolidated into a larger Haldimand. Cayuga is now an unincorporated community in Ward 2 of Haldimand County.

== Climate ==
On February 13, 2009, the Grand River flooded when the river ice thawed, damaging Cayuga and Dunnville, Ontario. On February 14, 2009, the CCGC Griffin proceeded up the river to help clear ice.

== Government ==
Cayuga is in Ward 2 of Haldimand County. The current councillor for Ward 2 is John Metcalfe, who has been councillor since 2018. Before him it was Fred Morison from 2010–2018 and before Morison, it was Buck Sloat from 2003 to 2010.

The current Mayor Of Haldimand County is Shelly Ann Bentley. The previous Mayor was Ken Hewitt 2010-2022. The Mayor before him was Marie Trainer from 2003 to 2010. Before Marie Trainer, the mayor was Lorraine Bergstrand 2001–2003.

The current Clerk is Evelyn Eichenbaum who works in Cayuga at the Haldimand County Cayuga Administration building. The current Chief Administrative Officer of Haldimand County is Don Boyle who works in Cayuga at the Haldimand County Cayuga Administration building.

== Demographics ==
Cayugans are overwhelmingly British by national background but many can trace their roots to an original German settlement near Cayuga in the 19th century. There was also a large Dutch migration to the area after the Second World War.

Canada census – Cayuga community profile

	2021	2016
Population	1,720 (+0.4% from 2016)	1,713 (+5.6% from 2011)
Land area	2.13 km^{2} (0.82 sq mi)	2.13 km^{2} (0.82 sq mi)
Population density	806.6/km^{2} (2,089/sq mi)	803.3/km^{2} (2,081/sq mi)
Median age	42.4 (M: 41.1, F: 43.6)	43.5 (M: 40.7, F: 44.2)
Private dwellings	695 (total)	715 (total)
Median household income	$88,000	$69,120

References: 2021 2016

=== Ethnicity ===
Only those populations which compose more than 1% of the population have been included.

Ethnic Groups in the Community of Cayuga, Ontario (2021)
Ethnic Group	2021		2016	
Ethnic Group	Pop.	%	Pop.	%
Canadian	295	17.15%	615	35.9%
English	620	36.05%	710	41.45%
Irish	350	20.35%	315	18.31%
Scottish	465	27.03%	455	26.56%
French (Note: Statistic includes all individuals that identified as having a French origin but not otherwise specified.)	140	8.14%	130	7.59%
German	310	18.02%	330	19.26%
Italian	95	5.52%	85	4.96%
Ukrainian	60	3.49%	45	2.63%
Dutch	200	11.63%	225	13.13%
Polish	30	1.74%	45	2.63%
Métis	30	1.74%	0	0%
Portuguese	30	1.74%	0	0%
Spanish	30	1.74%	15	0.88%
Swedish	30	1.74%	0	0%
Hungarian	35	2.03%	25	1.46%
Mohawk	25	1.45%	0	0%
Total responses	1,715	99.71%	1,735	101.28%
Total population	1,720	100%	1,713	100%
Note: Totals greater than 100% due to multiple origin responses.

=== Language ===
As of the 2021 census, there were 1,675 citizens that spoke English only and 30 that are bilingual in both official languages.

=== Religion ===
As of the 2021 census, there were 1,045 citizens identifying as Christian and 655 as non-religious and secular perspectives.

== Education ==
Public education in Cayuga is administered by the Grand Erie District School Board and the Catholic schools by the Brant Haldimand Norfolk Catholic District School Board. Schools located in Cayuga include:

- JL Mitchener Public School
- St. Stephen's School
- Cayuga Secondary School

== Sports ==
Just south of Cayuga and demographically associated is the hamlet of Fisherville. In 1954 a hockey team composed of local players which played out of the Cayuga Arena was sponsored by 'Fisherville Seed' and consequently known as the Fisherville Seedmen. It won the Ontario Intermediate Hockey Championship. Jack Melenbacher a local who was at the time an NHL referee mentored the team and a young Roy Edwards who played goal for the Seedmen later starred in the NHL for the Detroit Red Wings.

James Daly, of Cayuga, is currently a national team athlete with Floorball Canada (2022). Last participating in the 2021 Floorball World Championships in Helsinki, Finland

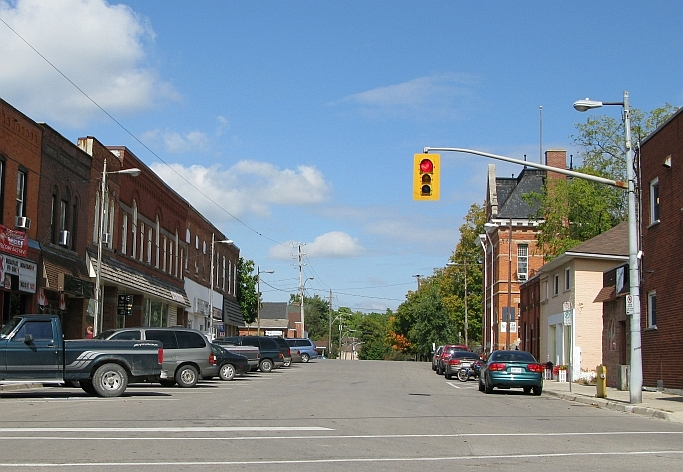
Cayuga, Ontario

== Attractions ==
In more recent years Cayuga has become known for auto racing. The oldest continually operating dragstrip in Canada and the fastest high bank oval race track in Canada, are located near the townsite; Cayuga International Speedway. It is a 5/8-mile oval auto racing track, which was reopened in 2017 and hosts a round of the NASCAR Pinty's Series. The drag strip was originally a runway built for training British Commonwealth pilots during the Second World War.

CayugaFest is an annual event in July, founded in 2002.

== Notable people ==
Birthplace of Frank Martin (1933-2007), who played over 300 games for the Chicago BlackHawks in the late 1940s and the early 1950s.

Birthplace of Helen Kinnear (1894-1970) who, in 1939, was appointed the first woman Superior Court judge in the British Empire having previously been appointed the first woman King's Counsel.

Both Marty McSorley and Ray Emery grew up playing minor league hockey in Cayuga. Both of which became NHL hockey players.

Birthplace of Jeremy LaLonde, Canadian filmmaker, grew up in Cayuga attending Cayuga Secondary School where he was a prominent member of the drama club. He has since gone on to direct multiple feature films including How to Plan an Orgy in a Small Town, Sex After Kids, The Go-Getters, The Untitled Work of Paul Shepard, and James vs. His Future Self. He has also directed the TV series Baroness Von Sketch Show.

== See also ==
- List of population centres in Ontario
