= Norfolk North =

Former federal electoral district in Ontario, Canada

Norfolk North was a federal electoral district represented in the House of Commons of Canada from 1867 to 1904. It was located in the province of Ontario. It was created by the British North America Act 1867, which divided the county of Norfolk into two ridings. The North Riding consisted of the Townships of Middleton, Townsend, and Windham, and the Town of Simcoe.

In 1882, the town of Tilsonburg, and the village of Waterford were added to the ridings, and the Town of Simcoe was removed.

The electoral district was abolished in 1903 when it was merged into Norfolk riding.

== Electoral history ==
1867 Canadian federal election: North Riding of Norfolk
Party	Candidate	Votes
Conservative	Aquila Walsh	1,026
Unknown	Dr. Duncombe	990
Eligible voters		2,347
Source: Canadian Parliamentary Guide, 1871

1872 Canadian federal election: North Riding of Norfolk
Party	Candidate	Votes
Liberal	John M. Charlton	1,324
Conservative	Aquila Walsh	1,274

1874 Canadian federal election: North Riding of Norfolk
Party	Candidate	Votes
Liberal	John M. Charlton	1,434
Unknown	D. Tisdale	1,264

1878 Canadian federal election: North Riding of Norfolk
Party	Candidate	Votes
Liberal	John M. Charlton	1,492
Conservative	Aquila Walsh	1,348

1882 Canadian federal election: North Riding of Norfolk
Party	Candidate	Votes
Liberal	John M. Charlton	1,940
Conservative	SINCLAIR, L.C.	1,562

1887 Canadian federal election: North Riding of Norfolk
Party	Candidate	Votes
Liberal	John M. Charlton	2,139
Conservative	SINCLAIR, Lachlan C.	1,861

1891 Canadian federal election: North Riding of Norfolk
Party	Candidate	Votes
Liberal	John M. Charlton	2,370
Conservative	SINCLAIR, Lachlin	1,902

1896 Canadian federal election: North Riding of Norfolk
Party	Candidate	Votes
Liberal	John M. Charlton	2,142
Patrons of Industry	MCGUIRE, Wm.	1,598

1900 Canadian federal election: North Riding of Norfolk
Party	Candidate	Votes
Liberal	John M. Charlton	acclaimed

== See also ==
- List of Canadian electoral districts
- Historical federal electoral districts of Canada
