= Haldimand Board of Education =

The Haldimand Board of Education is the former name of the Haldimand County Board of Education created in 1969 by the amalgamation of the West Haldimand Board and Dunnville Board of Education. In 1974 with the creation of the Regional Municipality of Haldimand Norfolk the board's name was changed to the Haldimand Board of Education. In 1997 "The Fewer School Boards Act" (written by the NDP in 1996 but introduced to the Legislative Assembly by the Mike Harris Tories) amalgamated the Haldimand, Norfolk and Brant County boards of education into the Haldimand Norfolk Brant District School Board 23, later changed to Grand Erie District School Board. In the past, high schools from this school board would have rivalries with high schools from the former Norfolk Board of Education. Even though the two counties share the same school board now, the winner of each county championship would face off against each other in a Haldimand-Norfolk Bowl championship. The main office was located in Cayuga, Ontario, Canada first in the former Haldimand County then Town of Halimand Offices and lastly in a newly constructed (1991) Haldimand Board Office in Cayuga, next to the existing Cayuga Secondary School site. It was disestablished in 1997 due to cutbacks in education that resulted in the centralization of government institutions.
