= Cayuga Secondary School =

Location
- 70 Highway 54; Cayuga, Ontario, N0A 1E0; Canada; 42.95511°N 79.85888°W

Information
- School type: High School
- Founded: 1963
- School board: Grand Erie District School Board
- Grades: 9-12 (With a victory lap option)
- Area: Cayuga, Ontario
- Colours: Green and Gold
- Mascot: Warrior
- Team name: Cayuga Warriors
- Website: granderie.ca/css/home

Cayuga Secondary School is a secondary school located at 70 Highway 54, Cayuga, Ontario, Canada. It is part of the Grand Erie District School Board. Cayuga Secondary School opened in 1963, under the name Cayuga Technical and Commercial High School since it did not offer a grade 13 program at the time. It earned secondary school status in 1970. The students are from J. L. Mitchener, Rainham Central, Seneca Central Seneca Unity and Oneida Central public schools, Caledonia Centennial, as well as some students from the Six Nations Reserve and from the Catholic elementary school, St. Stephen's. The school currently has about 600 students enrolled.

== Athletics ==
Cayuga is the home of the Warriors Football Team. The team has currently joined "Forces" with one of its two rivals (Hagersville/McKinnon) Hagersville. After a previous coach during the 2015 season, the two schools contacted one another and became the "Warricanes". The football team was denied entry into the Haldimand-Norfolk Football League but continued on to play exhibition against Simcoe (Sabres), Delhi (Raiders), Waterford (Wolves), McKinnon (Blue Devils) and the Bishop Mac Celtics of Guelph. Cayuga and Hagersville lost 3 of 4 games (First game no score was kept) defeating a team both teams have not won against in more than 5 years the Waterford Wolves 10–1.

== See also ==
- Education in Ontario
- List of secondary schools in Ontario
