= John M. Charlton =

Canadian politician

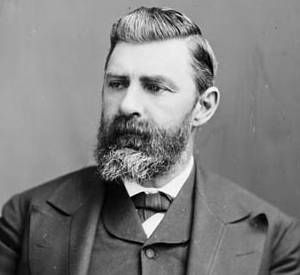
John M. Charlton Source: Library and Archives Canada

John Charlton (February 3, 1829 – 11 February 1910) was a Canadian Member of Parliament and businessman. Charlton was the Member of Parliament for Norfolk North, Ontario for 32 years until 1904. He was the author of "Parliamentary Recollections" and contributed to the North American Review.

Born in Garbuttsville, New York, John was the eldest son of Adam Charlton of Newcastle upon Tyne, England. He was first educated in McLaren Grammar School of Caledonia, New York before moving to the Springville Academy in the state. Interested in bettering himself, he studied medicine, the law, and public speaking. In 1849, at the age of twenty, he moved with his parents to Ayr, in Dumfries Township, Ontario, and became a farmer. Charlton's interest in educating himself continued led to him helping to start a library in the town of Ayr. In 1853, he moved to Lynedoch and opened a general store with his uncle and future father-in-law George Gray. Charlton married Ella Gray, daughter of George Gray of Charlotteville, Ontario, in 1854.

His next career move was to become the Canadian Manager for the lumber company of Messieurs Smith & Westover of Town of Tonawanda, New York in 1859. Charlton was first elected to the House of Commons in 1871, as member of the Liberal Party of Canada. He had strong religious views and high ideals, was a strong advocate for provincial rights, and worked for years for passage of a law affording protection to women and girls under a certain age. His speeches were considered blunt and brusque compared to his contemporaries. After a tour of the United States in 1897, Charlton served on the Joint High Commission between Great Britain, Canada and the United States from 1898 to 1899. His wife, Ella Gray, died in 1905, and Charlton entered a marriage with Cora J. Owen in 1907. He died of a stroke at his home in Lynedoch in 1910.

1874 Canadian federal election: North Riding of Norfolk
Party	Candidate	Votes
Liberal	John M. Charlton	1,434
Unknown	D. Tisdale	1,264

1878 Canadian federal election: North Riding of Norfolk
Party	Candidate	Votes
Liberal	John M. Charlton	1,492
Conservative	Aquila Walsh	1,348

1882 Canadian federal election: North Riding of Norfolk
Party	Candidate	Votes
Liberal	John M. Charlton	1,940
Conservative	SINCLAIR, L.C.	1,562

1887 Canadian federal election: North Riding of Norfolk
Party	Candidate	Votes
Liberal	John M. Charlton	2,139
Conservative	SINCLAIR, Lachlan C.	1,861

1891 Canadian federal election: North Riding of Norfolk
Party	Candidate	Votes
Liberal	John M. Charlton	2,370
Conservative	SINCLAIR, Lachlin	1,902

1896 Canadian federal election: North Riding of Norfolk
Party	Candidate	Votes
Liberal	John M. Charlton	2,142
Patrons of Industry	MCGUIRE, Wm.	1,598

1900 Canadian federal election: North Riding of Norfolk
Party	Candidate	Votes
Liberal	John M. Charlton	acclaimed
