= Dunnville Secondary School =

Location
- 110 Helena Street; Haldimand County; Dunnville, Ontario, N1A 2S5; Canada
- Coordinates: 42°54′20″N 79°37′41″W

Information
- School type: Public, High school
- School board: Grand Erie District School Board
- School number: 906069
- Principal: William Stead
- Grades: 9 to 12
- Enrollment: 562 (January 2016)
- Language: English
- Team name: Panthers
- Communities served: Dunnville and surrounding area
- Feeder schools: Thompson Creek Elementary School, Mapleview elementary school
- Website: www.granderie.ca/schools/dss

Dunnville Secondary School is a public high school in Dunnville, Ontario, Canada, part of the Grand Erie District School Board. The school accommodates students from Haldimand County between the ages of 14 and 21. As of January 2016, the school had 562 students.

== See also ==
- Education in Ontario
- List of secondary schools in Ontario
