= Aquila Walsh =

Canadian politician

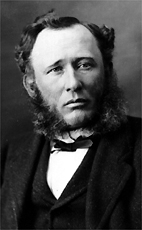

Member of the Canadian Parliament for Norfolk North
- In office 1867–1872
- Succeeded by: John M. Charlton

Personal details
- Born: May 15, 1823 Charlotteville Township, Upper Canada
- Died: March 6, 1885 (aged 61) Winnipeg, Manitoba, Canada
- Party: Conservative
- Relations: Francis Leigh Walsh, father Thomas Welch, grandfather
- Children: William L. Walsh

Aquila Walsh (15 May 1823 – 6 March 1885) was a Canadian civil engineer, politician, and civil servant.

Walsh was born in Charlotteville Township in 1823, the son of Francis Leigh Walsh and grandson of Thomas Welch. He represented Norfolk in the Legislative Assembly of the Province of Canada from 1861 until 1867. In 1867, he was elected to the House of Commons of Canada for the Ontario riding of Norfolk North. A Conservative, he was defeated in 1872 and 1878. He was reeve of Simcoe from 1857 to 1859 and mayor in 1882. In 1882, he was appointed commissioner of crown lands for Manitoba. He died in Winnipeg, Manitoba in 1885.

His son William L. Walsh served as Lieutenant Governor of Alberta from 1931 to 1936.

1867 Canadian federal election: North Riding of Norfolk
Party	Candidate	Votes
Conservative	Aquila Walsh	1,026
Unknown	Dr. Duncombe	990
Eligible voters		2,347
Source: Canadian Parliamentary Guide, 1871

1872 Canadian federal election: North Riding of Norfolk
Party	Candidate	Votes
Liberal	John M. Charlton	1,324
Conservative	Aquila Walsh	1,274
