= Valley Heights Secondary School =

Public high school in Ontario, Canada

Location
- 2561 Highway 59 South; Walsingham, Ontario, N0E 1G0; Canada; 42.693665°N 80.541887°W

Information
- School type: Public high school
- Religious affiliation: Secular
- Founded: 1971
- School board: Grand Erie District School Board (formerly Norfolk Board of Education)
- Area trustee: Scott Wilson (school council chair)
- Principal: Allison High
- Grades: 9-12 (formerly 9-13)
- Enrollment: ~600 (2011)
- Language: English
- Area: Walsingham, Ontario
- Colours: Purple and White
- Mascot: Valley Heights Bear
- Team name: Bears (formerly Voyageurs)
- Yearbook: The Spectrum
- Website: www.granderie.ca/schools/vhss

Valley Heights Secondary School (in French, "L'École Secondaire Valley Heights") is a two-story rural high school located near Walsingham, Ontario, Canada. The official initials for this high school are VHSS.

== History ==
Opened in 1971, Valley Heights sits on a property that spans 100 acres (400,000 m^{2}) and includes fields, Carolinian forests, rivers and marshy areas. During the 2000–01 school year, approximately 700 students attended. However, a Roman Catholic school in Simcoe opened in 2001, which offered students more course choices (even though it was the closest to Simcoe Composite School). This, along with the elimination of grade thirteen in Ontario, resulted in a decrease in student population to 500.

Mrs. Jody Hevesi ran the Hidden Valley Cafe, which has been a staple at Valley Heights Secondary School since its establishment in the year 2000. As a "healthy" school, energy drinks have been banned from the premises in September 2011 along with non-baked foods and breaded foods. A similar ban was enforced at school in Hove, England; where Headteacher Malvina Sanders states that "consuming high-energy drinks can have a detrimental impact on the ability of young people to concentrate in class."

A roof fire occurred on July 25, 2012, on top of the gymnasium as a result of a botched roofing job. The school incurred $25,000 in overall damages, and the damaged areas were secured before the thunderstorms that occurred early the next morning. Repairs were officially completed on July 31, which did not affect any classes or activities that started in September 2012.

VHSS has enhanced its academic programs to attract potential transfer students. Plans to close down Port Dover Composite School came into reality on the night of January 31, 2013.

== Campus ==
This school is the only high school in the entire Haldimand-Norfolk-Brant region to receive top marks for stewardship of the environment, minimizing the waste of natural resources, and conserving energy for future generations of Valley Heights students. The idea was initiated in 2008 and deemed successful by 2011. Even though a sizeable number of students who attend Valley Heights are not Mennonites, the location of the school makes it ideal for Mennonites to attend, as it is adjacent to the farmland that their parents work on.

Valley Heights Secondary School is partially powered by solar energy coming from solar panels installed in the immediate vicinity.

== See also ==
- Education in Ontario
- List of secondary schools in Ontario
