= Frank Walshe =

Australian rules footballer, born 1904

Personal information
- Full name: Francis Paul Walshe
- Born: 30 September 1904; Carlton, Victoria
- Died: 14 June 1962 (aged 57); Heidelberg, Victoria
- Original team: Coburg
- Height: 180 cm (5 ft 11 in)
- Weight: 87 kg (192 lb)

Playing career^{1}
Years	Club	Games (Goals)
1929–31	Footscray	25 (4)
1932	Carlton	1 (0)
Total		26 (4)
- ^{1} Playing statistics correct to the end of 1932.

Francis Paul Walshe (30 September 1904 – 14 June 1962) was an Australian rules footballer who played with Carlton and Footscray in the Victorian Football League (VFL).
