= Waterford District High School =

Public high school in Ontario, Canada

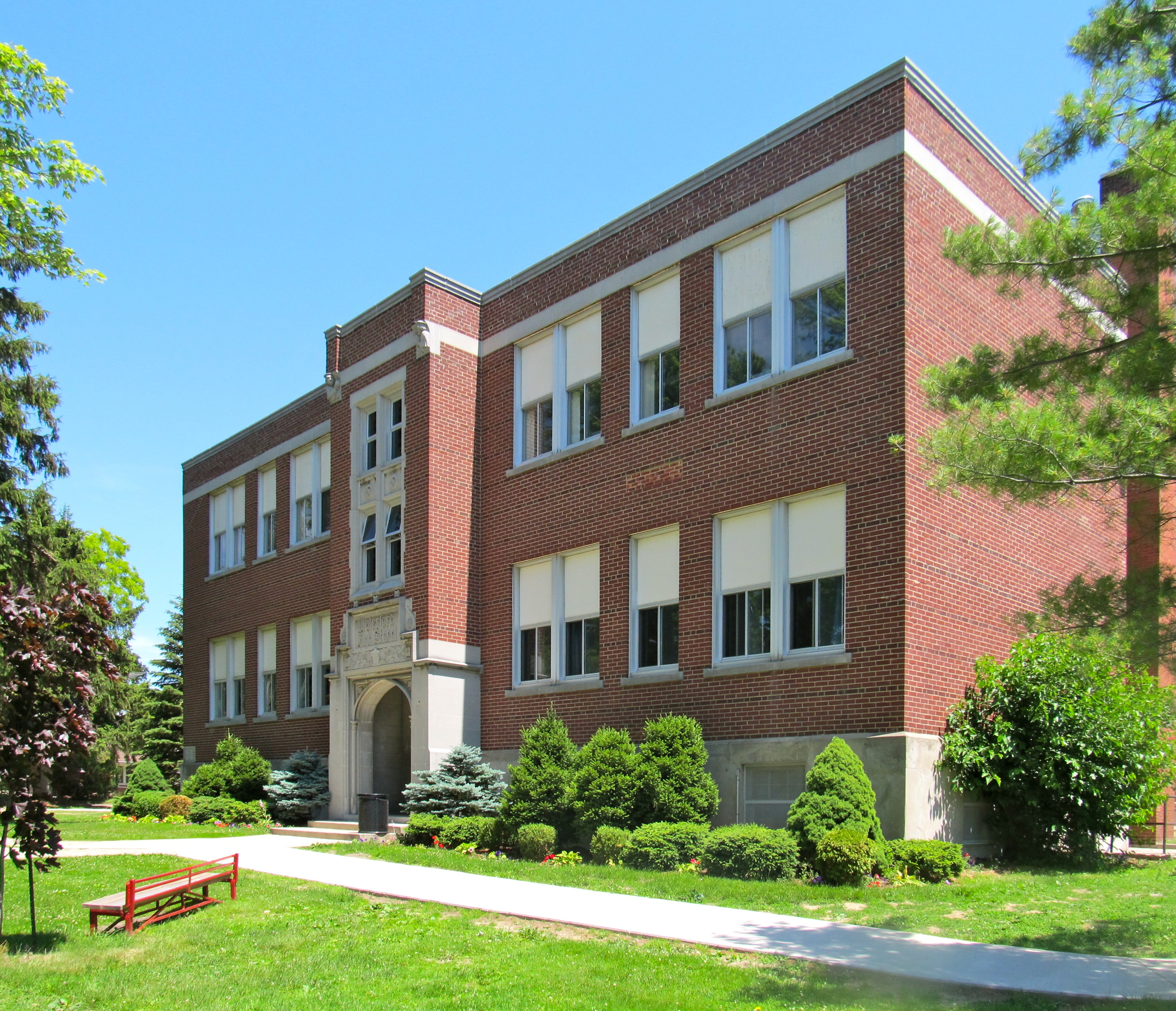

Location
- Waterford District High School 227 Main St. S., PO Box 370; Waterford, Ontario, N0E 1Y0; Canada; 42.928337°N 80.287871°W

Information
- School type: Public high school
- Motto: Abeunt Studia in Mores (Studies build character)
- Religious affiliation: Secular
- Founded: August 1892
- School board: Grand Erie District School Board
- School number: 950785
- Administrator: Martin Verspagen
- Principal: Pamela Lynn O'Halloran
- Grades: 9–12
- Enrollment: 380 (September 2018)
- Language: English
- Colours: White, purple and scarlet
- Mascot: Wolf
- Team name: Wolves
- Website: sites.granderie.ca/schools/wdhs

Waterford District High School, also known as WDHS, is a public high school in Waterford, Ontario, Canada. It is the northernmost secondary school in Norfolk County.

== History ==
The first school board meeting for the new high school in Waterford was held on February 15, 1892. The board purchased 1.8 acres of land on the northeast corner of Main and Brown streets at a cost of $150 per acre. The building was constructed for about $7,000 and the enrollment in the first year was approximately 100 students. In 1936 the structure burned down, but was rebuilt and reopened in 1937.

== Summary ==
=== Athletics ===
WDHS has a variety of sports teams including football, rugby, soccer, field lacrosse, basketball, volleyball, golf, badminton, tennis, track and field, hockey, and cheerleading. The team mascot is a wolf.

=== Fair Day ===
Each year, at the Norfolk County Fair, the students of Waterford District High School compete with other local high schools in events like tug-o-war, cheerleading, and road racing. Each school fills a separate area of the grandstands and is judged on spirit and decorations.

=== Grade 9 Day ===
Grade 9 day at Waterford District High School is a long-standing tradition. The grade 9 students are paired with senior students to complete activities. This event is an opportunity for students from grade 9 and grade 12 to get to know one another.

There is also a barbecue lunch for the students run by the school's student council.

=== Spring musical ===
There is an active drama, and music department at Waterford District High School that puts on yearly musicals such as Be More Chill ,Ride the Cyclone ,Catch Me If You Can and The Music Man.

=== Renovations ===
The school underwent renovations from 2010 to 2012. Modernized areas included science laboratories, a larger Edukids day care for staff members and unwed student mothers, new gymnasium floors, and an addition of new offices for the school board. The school now has an elevator.

Fundraising was done for a new electronic scoreboard for the football field, replacing the old manual score board. Conforming with Canadian high school football standards, the scoreboard shows the time and score of both teams along with the down, the yardage of the line of scrimmage, the yards to go until a first down, the team with the possession (usually signified with the outline of a football in lights next to the possessing team's score), and the quarter.

== See also ==
- Education in Ontario
- List of secondary schools in Ontario
