= Francis Leigh Walsh =

Canadian politician (1789–1884)

Francis Leigh Walsh (March 12, 1789 – August 14, 1884) was a political figure in Upper Canada.

He was born in Harford County, Maryland in 1789, the son of Thomas Welch, a United Empire Loyalist. He came to Norfolk County with his family in 1793. In 1810, he became registrar for Norfolk County, succeeding his father. He served in the local militia during the War of 1812, becoming captain in 1824. He represented Norfolk in the Legislative Assembly of Upper Canada from 1820 to 1828 and from 1834 to 1836. In 1821, he was named justice of the peace in the London District and, in 1838, in the Talbot District.

He died in Simcoe on August 14, 1884.

His son, Aquila Walsh, served in the Legislative Assembly of the Province of Canada and the House of Commons of Canada.
