= Smart Technologies =

Technology company

Smart Technologies ULC
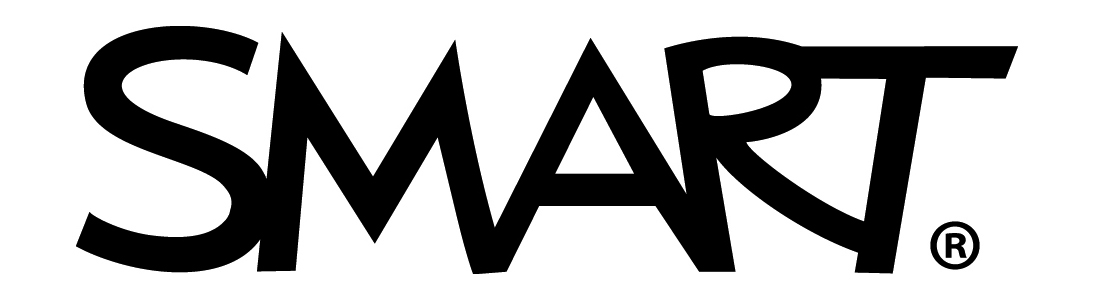

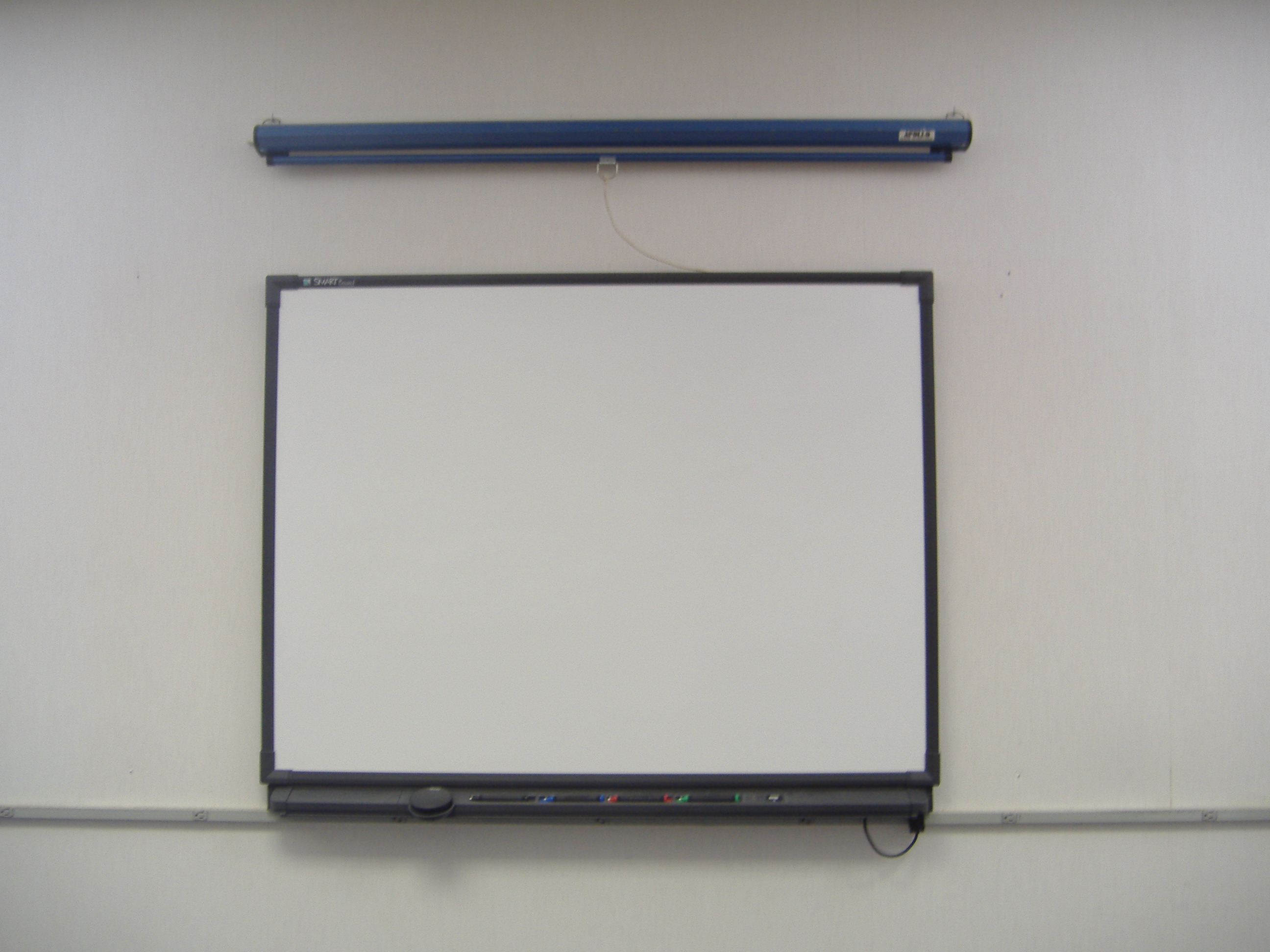
- A Smart Board in a classroom
- Type: Unlimited liability corporation
- Industry: Computer technology Computer software
- Founded: 1987; 39 years ago
- Founder: David Martin; Nancy Knowlton
- Area served: Worldwide
- Key people: Nicholas Svensson (CEO)
- Products: Interactive whiteboards
- Revenue: US$492.9 million (FY2015)
- Net income: US$24.1 million (FY2015)
- Number of employees: 795
- Parent: Foxconn
- Website: smarttech.com

Smart Technologies (styled as SMART Technologies) is a Canadian company headquartered in Calgary, Alberta, Canada and wholly owned by Foxconn. Founded in 1987, SMART is best known as the developer of interactive whiteboards branded as the "Smart Board" (styled as SMART Board) widely used in education and business.

== History ==
Smart was founded in 1987 by husband and wife David Martin and Nancy Knowlton. In 1991, Smart introduced its interactive whiteboard, branded the "Smart Board". In 2003, Smart developed and later patented DViT (Digital Vision Touch) technology which was an important feature of the SMART Board.

In 2009, Smart filed a patent infringement lawsuit against New Zealand-based NextWindow before acquiring the company outright in 2010. On July 15, 2010, Smart Technologies placed an initial public offering on the NASDAQ stock exchange and Toronto Stock Exchange (TSX), raising upwards of $660 million. Later that year, several class action complaints were filed against Smart in the U.S. District Courts in New York and Illinois. Filed on behalf of the purchasers of the Class A Subordinate Voting Shares in Smart's IPO in July 2010, the complaints alleged that the company did not disclose important information prior to the IPO. A settlement was reached in March 2013.

As of the 2011 fiscal year end, Smart Board interactive whiteboards led the interactive whiteboard category with a 63% share in the United States, 44% share in EMEA (Europe, Middle East and Africa) and 47% share globally. In April 2012, amid a declining stock price and sales resulting from decreased school board spending, both Martin and Knowlton resigned from their executive roles at Smart before leaving the board in April 2014.

On December 11, 2012, Smart Technologies announced it would begin corporate restructuring. The company proceeded to lay off 25% of its employees. Then-CEO Neil Gaydon stated that it would save the company approximately $40 million, and cited competition in the market as part of the reason for restructuring. In 2016, SMART Technologies Inc. was acquired by Foxconn for $200 million.
