= Holy Trinity Catholic High School (Simcoe) =

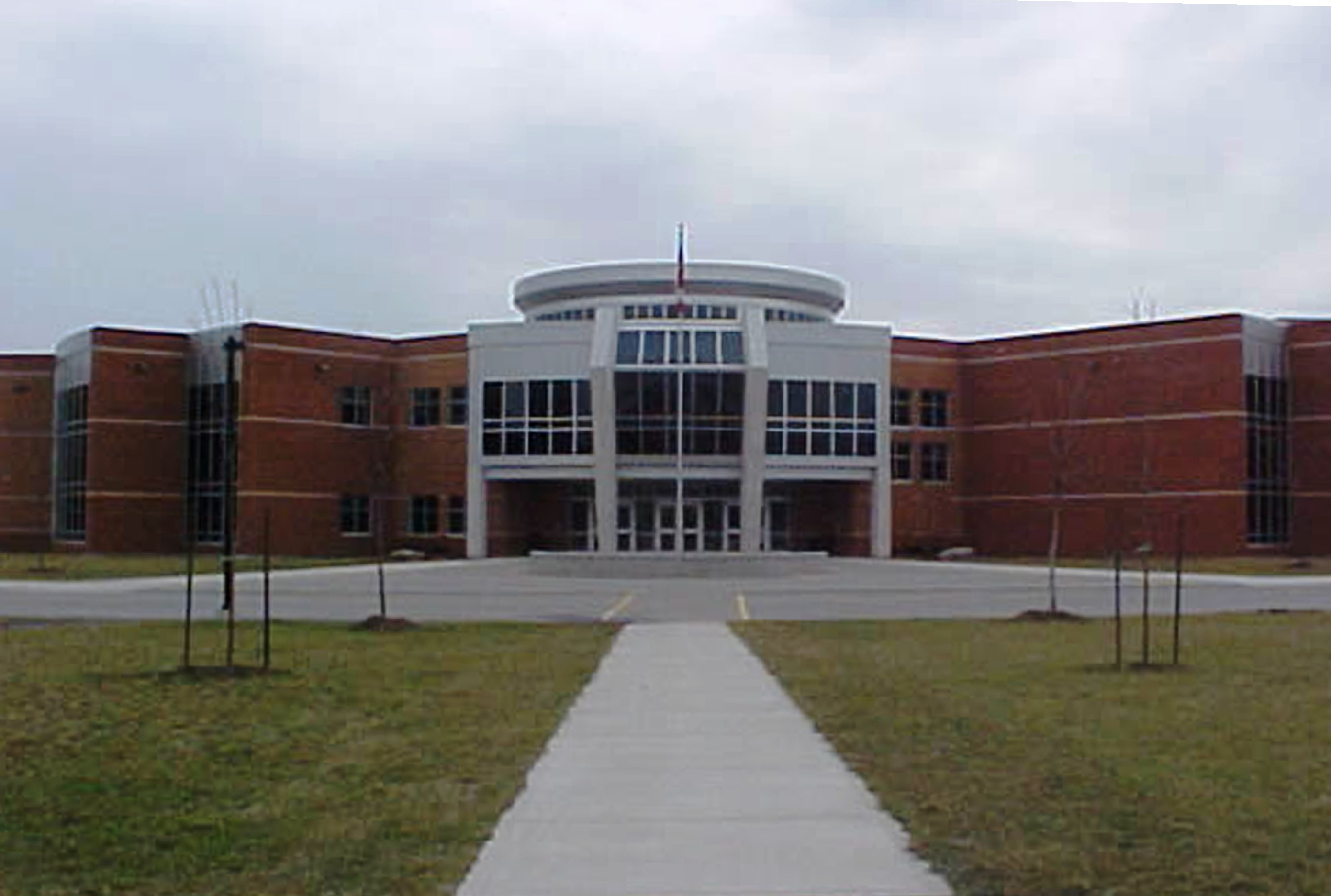
- Front entrance of Holy Trinity CHS

Location
- 128 Evergreen Hill Road Simcoe, Ontario, N3Y 4K1; Canada; 42°49′23″N 80°18′43″W

Information
- School type: Catholic High School
- Motto: "That all may be one"
- Religious affiliation: Catholic
- Founded: 2001
- School board: Brant Haldimand Norfolk Catholic District School Board
- School number: 720232
- Principal: Humberto Cacilhas
- Grades: 9–12
- Enrollment: 1064 (August 2019)
- Language: English; French
- Colours: Maroon, black, silver
- Mascot: Titan
- Website: www.trinitycatholic.ca

Holy Trinity Catholic High School (HT) is a Roman Catholic high school in Simcoe, Ontario, Canada.

School uniforms are mandatory during school hours, and courses are conducted in a theological manner. Though it is a Roman Catholic school, the student population has Catholic and non-Catholic components.

== History ==
The school was founded in September 2001, with an initial enrollment of 750 students.

The school outgrew the main building's original capacity of 1,000 students, and an annex was built to accommodate the increase in enrollment. Construction for the annex began in 2006. John Burroughs, the principal at that time, expected enrollment to peak in the following years. The addition was ready for use in September 2007 with ten classrooms, a food services classroom and a conference room in the southwest corner of the school.

On October 25, 2013, a fire was deliberately set in a girl's first floor washroom. The damage totaled over $75,000.

The Super Cities Walk for Multiple Sclerosis held in Simcoe's Holy Trinity Catholic High School raised more than $57,000 in donations for multiple sclerosis.

== Amenities ==
=== Technology ===
The technology department at Holy Trinity consists of Communication, Construction, Cosmetology, Design/Drafting, Manufacturing, Culinary Arts and Transportation. Some of the technology includes:

- Haas CNC milling machine
- AXYZ CNC Router
- iMac G5 computers with Final Cut Studio and Logic Pro software
- Smart Board, an interactive board which doubles as a computer screen; projectors are required for this board.
- Daily televised announcements from the school television network (formerly Trinity Vision Network or "TVN", it was renamed to Holy Trinity Television or "HTTV" following a studio update before the 2013–2014 school year). This is also available online and in a video podcast, still available on their YouTube channel.
- Comprehensive transportation (automotive) shop
- Cosmetology course teaching hairstyling and aesthetics

=== Athletics ===
The secondary school is represented in many different intramural sports as the "Holy Trinity Titans". Titan teams include swimming, soccer, rugby, track and field, badminton, tug-o-war, golf, basketball, hockey, tennis, cheerleading, volleyball, cross-country, football, figure skating and rowing.

Holy Trinity's fundraising efforts in the 2006–2007 school year raised enough money to start a football team for the school.

In 2018, the boys' hockey team won the Ontario Federation of School Athletic Associations (OFSAA) A/AA championship in Collingwood, Ontario.

== See also ==
- Education in Ontario
- List of secondary schools in Ontario
