= Delhi District Secondary School =

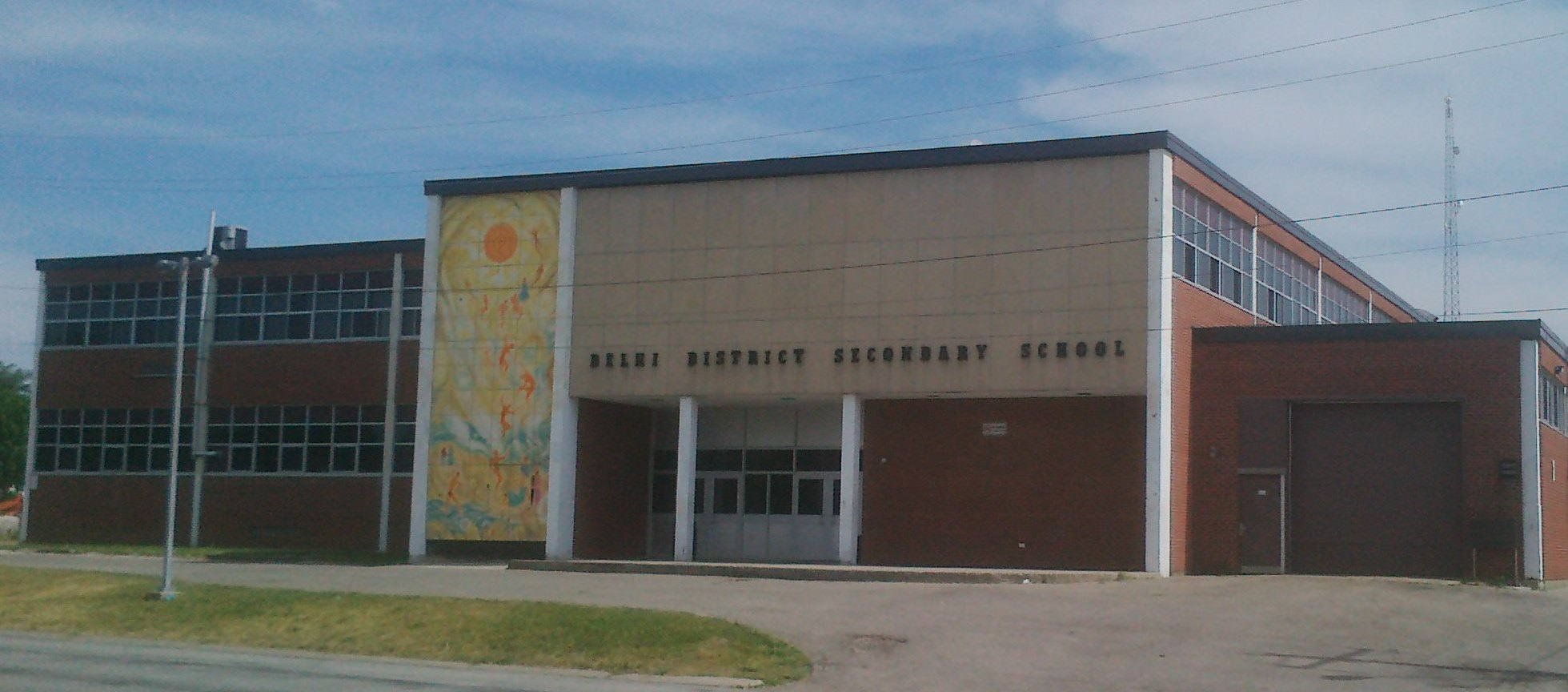

Location
- 393 James Street; Delhi, Ontario, N4B 2B6; Canada; 42.851507°N 80.491869°W

Information
- School type: Public, high school
- Religious affiliation: Secular
- Founded: 1941
- School board: Grand Erie District School Board
- School number: 903728
- Principal: Griffin Cobb
- Grades: 9-12
- Enrollment: 546 (October 29, 2010)
- Language: English
- Area: Norfolk County, Ontario
- Colours: Blue and Gold
- Mascot: Raider
- Team name: Delhi Raiders
- Website: schools.gedsb.net/ddss/

Delhi District Secondary School is a publicly funded high school that is located near downtown Delhi in Norfolk County, Ontario, Canada.

== Summary ==
The rural school had one of the lowest enrollment rates in Norfolk County, and had been considered for closure on several occasions, until September 2010 when they received over 200 students from Norwich Secondary School.

== Athletics ==
Delhi District Secondary School has a variety of athletics teams including football, cheerleading, basketball, volleyball, soccer (association football), tennis, badminton, cross country, track and field, scholastic wrestling, and swimming.

== Future ==
Port Dover Composite School was officially permanently closed on January 31, 2013. In response, DDSS has improved their academics programs in an attempt to keep transfer students from going to their rival Simcoe Composite School. Advanced placement courses were made available for senior academic subjects. Busing for the Norwich area was kept intact; as they represented the northernmost traditional boundary for DDSS busing.

== See also ==
- Education in Ontario
- List of secondary schools in Ontario
