= Simcoe Composite School =

Location
- 40 Wilson Avenue; Simcoe, Ontario, N3Y 2E5; Canada; 42.841147°N 80.303949°W

Information
- School type: Public high school
- Motto: Non sibi sed patriae and The key to SuCceSs is SCS (Not to them but fatherland)
- Established: 1893
- School board: Grand Erie District School Board (formerly Norfolk Board of Education)
- Principal: Jennifer Ippolito
- Grades: 9–12 (formerly 9-13)
- Enrollment: 725 (2024–2025)
- Language: English
- Colours: Blue and white
- Mascot: Sabre
- Team name: Sabres
- Website: www.granderie.ca/schools/scs/

Simcoe Composite School (SCS) is a public secondary school in Simcoe, Ontario, Canada. Operated by the Grand Erie District School Board, the school serves students in grades 9 through 12. Its origins date to the construction of Simcoe High School in 1893.

The school is located at 40 Wilson Drive and had an enrolment of 725 students during the 2024–2025 school year.

== History ==
=== Origins and early development ===
The origins of Simcoe Composite School date to 1893, when a two-storey brick building was constructed for Simcoe High School at the corner of Wilson Avenue and Norfolk Street in Simcoe, Ontario.

=== First World War memorial (1925) ===
The Norfolk School Board donated land for the construction of the Norfolk War Memorial, also known as the Carillon Tower, in memory of former Simcoe High School students killed during the First World War. Construction began on November 4, 1924, and the memorial was dedicated on June 17, 1925.

During the dedication ceremony, memorial plaques on the east side of the tower commemorating 12 former students of Simcoe High School were unveiled by Lydia Quanbury of Woodhouse, whose two sons were among those killed in the war.

=== Gymnasium fire and reconstruction (2003–2006) ===
On October 10, 2003, a major fire destroyed the school's gymnasium, reportedly causing approximately $1 million in damage to Simcoe Composite School.

== Academics and programs ==
Simcoe Composite School offers academic, technical and vocational courses, including programs in construction, manufacturing, communications technology, transportation, technological design and hairstyling.

The school offers Specialist High Skills Major (SHSM) programs in communications technology, with a focus on cinema, and automotive services. Its Grade 12 health sciences program is offered in partnership with Norfolk General Hospital, providing students with opportunities to explore careers in health care.

An Extended French program was introduced in 2020. According to the school, it is the only such program offered at Grand Erie District School Board schools in Haldimand and Norfolk counties.

=== Technology and Innovation Hub (2026) ===
In February 2026, the Grand Erie District School Board announced that Simcoe Composite School had been selected as one of three locations for its Technology and Innovation Hubs initiative, scheduled to launch in September 2026. The initiative expanded access to technology-focused education, including skilled trades, manufacturing, computer technology and digital media. Simcoe Composite School was designated as the hub serving Norfolk County.

== Extracurricular activities ==
=== Athletics ===
The school's athletic teams compete under the name Simcoe Sabres. Sports offered include basketball, volleyball, football, hockey and cheerleading.

== Notable alumni ==
- Rob Blake, Canadian professional hockey player, Olympic gold medallist and member of the Hockey Hall of Fame.
- Rick Danko, Canadian musician and bassist and vocalist for the rock group The Band.
- Margo Davidson, Canadian musician and saxophonist, best known as a founding member of The Parachute Club.
- Eric Hoskins, Canadian physician and former Ontario Minister of Health and Long-Term Care (2014–2018).
- Red Kelly, Canadian professional hockey player and coach.
- Megan Timpf, Canadian softball player who represented Canada at the 2008 Summer Olympics.

== See also ==
- Education in Ontario
- List of secondary schools in Ontario
