= Grand Erie District School Board =

School district in Ontario, Canada

Location
- 349 Erie Ave; Brantford, Ontario; N3T 5V3 Canada

District information
- Chair of the board: Brian Doyle
- Director of education: JoAnna Roberto
- Schools: 72 (58 Elementary Schools, 14 Secondary Schools – 2020-21)
- Budget: CA $333.7 million (2020–21)
- District ID: B66168

Students and staff
- Students: 26,207 (460 of total on an Education Services Agreement – 2020–21)
- Staff: 2,756 (Full-Time Equivalent – 2020–21)

Other information
- Website: www.granderie.ca

The Grand Erie District School Board is a school board that has legal jurisdiction over Norfolk County, Haldimand County, and Brant County in the province of Ontario, Canada. The main headquarters are in Brantford.

== History ==
The board was formed from the amalgamation of the Norfolk Board of Education, the Brant County Board of Education, and the Haldimand Board of Education in 1998. The announcement of the new board was made in September 1997 as a part of the "Fewer School Boards Act." This was based on a report created in 1996 by the Bob Rae government; who recommended the changes. While the board was officially established on January 1, 1998, many of the administrative positions lasted until the beginning of May in 1998.

In 1998, under Progressive Conservative Premier Mike Harris's government, the way public schools were funded dramatically changed. Among the changes, the province replaced local boards' power to levy taxes to fund schools with a centralized system of education grants. The new regime was accompanied by a law forcing school boards to adopt balanced budgets. These changes contributed to school closures and consolidations in the Grand Erie Board.

== Current elementary schools ==
- Agnes G. Hodge Public School
- Banbury Heights Public School
- Bellview Public School
- Bloomsburg Public School
- Boston Public School
- Branlyn Community School
- Brier Park Public School
- Burford District Elementary School
- Caledonia Centennial Public School
- Cedarland Public School
- Centennial-Grand Woodlands School
- Central Public School
- Cobblestone Elementary School
- Courtland Public School
- Delhi Public School
- Echo Place School
- Ecole Confédération Elementary School (French Immersion)
- Ecole Dufferin Public School (French Immersion)
- Elgin Avenue Public School
- Glen Morris Public School
- Graham Bell - Victoria Public School
- Grand River Public School
- Grandview Public School
- Greenbrier Public School
- Hagersville Elementary School
- Houghton Public School
- J.L. Mitchener Public School
- James Hillier Public School
- Jarvis Public School
- King George Elementary School
- Lakewood Elementary School
- Langton Public School
- Lansdowne-Costain Public School
- Lynndale Heights Public School
- Major Ballachey Public School
- Mt. Pleasant School
- North Ward School
- Oakland-Scotland Public School
- Oneida Central Public School
- Onondaga-Brant Public School
- Paris Central Public School
- Port Rowan Public School
- Prince Charles Public School
- Princess Elizabeth Public School
- Rainham Central School
- River Heights School
- Russell Reid Public School
- Ryerson Heights Elementary School
- Seneca Central Public School
- St. George-German Public School
- Teeterville Public School
- Thompson Creek Elementary School
- Walpole North Elementary School
- Walsh Public School
- Walter Gretzky Elementary
- Waterford Public School
- West Lynn Public School
- Woodman-Cainsville School

== Current secondary schools ==
- Brantford Collegiate Institute and Vocational School
- Cayuga Secondary School
- Delhi District Secondary School
- Dunnville Secondary School
- Hagersville Secondary School
- McKinnon Park Secondary School
- North Park Collegiate and Vocational School
- Paris District High School
- Pauline Johnson Collegiate and Vocational School
- Simcoe Composite School
- Valley Heights Secondary School
- Waterford District High School

== Secondary school athletics ==
The secondary schools in the board play in three different sports associations. Schools in Brant County play in the Brant County Secondary School Athletics Association, Norfolk Country Schools play in Norfolk Secondary School Athletics Association, and Haldimand County schools compete in Southern Ontario Secondary School Athletics Association Zone II. Schools winning BCSSAA and NSSAA move onto CWOSSA while Haldimand schools play in SOSSA. All schools move on from there to OFSAA.

== Elementary schools in Norfolk County ==
- Boston Public School is a 200-student feeder school to Waterford District High School that consists of eight grades.
- Courtland Public School is a feeder school to Valley Heights Secondary School and Delhi District Secondary School.
- Delhi Public School (to grade 8) is a 450-student feeder schools for Delhi District Secondary School.
- Elgin Avenue Public School is a 450-student feeder school to Simcoe Composite School and Waterford District High School.
- Houghton Public School is a grade 8 feeder school to Valley Heights Secondary School.
- Langton Public School is a 250-student eighth grade feeder school for Valley Heights Secondary School.
- Lynndale Heights Public School is a K-8 public elementary school located in Simcoe, Ontario.
- Waterford Public School is a public elementary school in Waterford, Ontario. Boston and Bloomsburg Public Schools, located outside of Waterford are feeder schools to Waterford District High School.
- West Lynn Public School is a K-8 school located in Simcoe, Ontario. Following grade 8, students attend Simcoe Composite School for high school.

Located within the Grand Erie District, but not part of the public school system, is the Old Colony Mennonite School, a private co-educational school for German Mennonites in the community of Langton, Ontario. The school teaches kindergarten through the eighth grade as in a typical parochial school. Due to its "Old Colony" name, Old Order and Conservative Mennonites tend to dominate the campus. High school students usually go to Valley Heights Secondary School but recent changes in the school board's policy has opened up all secondary schools in Norfolk County for the eighth-grade graduates.

== Closed schools ==
Walsingham Public School was an elementary school that educated in grades K-8, located in Walsingham Township, that was closed along with St. Williams Public School when consolidation review amalgamated these two sites into the Port Rowan Public School. The schools were feeder schools to Valley Heights Secondary School. Due to the nearby presence of the Old Colony Mennonite School, which taught the local German Mennonite population, it had to attract students from both the northern and southern parts of Walsingham. Musician Geoff Suderman-Gladwell taught here.

North and South Public Schools were elementary schools in Simcoe, Ontario, that taught children from kindergarten to sixth grade. These schools were feeder schools to Elgin Avenue Public School. The schools were established in the 1928. Windham Public School was closed in 2009. Students now attend either Delhi Public School or Teeterville public school, making both schools K-8 (formerly K-6). Nixon Public School was located near Simcoe, Ontario; it along with Lyndoch were closed and consolidated at an enlarged Walsh Elementary. Port Dover Public School served Port Dover, Ontario, and was a feeder school to Port Dover Composite School before being amalgamated into Doverwood Public School which subsequently was closed when Port Dover Composite was converted to Lakewood Elementary School.

Two of the schools located in Paris, Ontario, Bethel-Oakhill and Queen's Ward schools closed during the 2009–2010 school year and were replaced by Cobblestone Elementary School.

Walpole South Elementary School was a former K to 8 school located on Sandusk Rd south of the 3rd Concession of Walpole Township adjacent to the Nanticoke Refinery. Opened in 1965 by the Walpole Board of Education amalgamated into the Haldimand County Board of Education in 1968, it was precipitously closed in June 1998 because of a Hydrogen Sulphide leak which occurred at the neighbouring refinery. The students were housed at Hagersville Secondary school for the last few weeks of the school year and then the school population was amalgamated with Jarvis Public School that fall with use of portables until a new addition to house the extra students opening in February 2000.

== See also ==
- List of school districts in Ontario
- List of high schools in Ontario
