= Kokay =

Kokay may refer to:

- Erika Kokay (born 1957), Brazilian politician
- Szabolcs Kókay (born 1976), Hungarian artist

== See also ==
- William Lawrence Kocay
- Koh-Kae, a Thai nut company
