= Coated peanuts =

Coated peanuts include:

- Chocolate-coated peanuts
- Japanese-style peanuts - peanuts with a wheat coating, known by various names around the world with different flavorings
