= Alfred Bell =

Alfred Bell may refer to:

- Alfred Bell (actor), Australian actor in Secret Valley and Ben Hall (TV series)
- Alfred Bell (politician), member of the 81st New York State Legislature
- Alfred H. Bell (1895–1977), petroleum geologist
