= Baptist Bible College Canada and Theological Seminary =

Theological college and seminary in Simcoe, Ontario

Coordinates: 42.85143°N 80.28048°W

- Motto: The first duty of preachers is to preach!
- Type: Theological college & seminary
- Active: 1978–2017
- Affiliation: Baptist
- President: Rev. Alan Feere
- Vice-president: Rev. Dr. Michael C. MacDonald
- Location: Simcoe, Ontario, Canada
- Colours: Red and white

Baptist Bible College Canada and Theological Seminary was a Baptist college and seminary in Ontario. It operated from 1978 to 2017.

The college was originally created with an emphasis on producing independent Baptist pastors and church planters in Canada. The college operated a distance education school to support the training of Baptist pastors, church planters, evangelists, missionaries and Christian school teachers in Canada and foreign countries.

== Status ==
The college and seminary were established by Dr. Harry Strachan Sr. in 1978.

In 1984, the Ontario legislature officially recognized the college and seminary as a degree-granting institutions for religious education through the passage of "An Act to Incorporate Baptist Bible College Canada and Theological Seminary, 1984".

On December 31, 2017, Baptist Bible College Canada was closed.

== Governance ==
In partial fulfillment of the Act to Incorporate, the college and seminary were governed by a board of trustees, roughly half of which was made up of members and officials of the Bethel Baptist Church, Simcoe, Ontario, and the other half from a Senate composed of the faculty, school administrators and outside church pastors.

== Academic programs ==
Undergraduate Programs:

- Associate of Theology Diploma (2 years)
- Associate of Religious Education Diploma (2 years)
- Graduate of Theology Diploma (3 years)
- Graduate of Religious Education Diploma (3 years)
- Bachelor of Theology Degree (Th.B.) (4 years)
- Bachelor of Religious Education Degree (B.R.E.) (4 years)

Graduate Programs include:

- Master of Religious Education Degree (M.R.E.)
- Master of Theology Degree (Th.M.)

Post Graduate Programs include:

- Doctor of Religious Education Degree (D.R.E.)
- Doctor of Theology Degree (Th.D.)
