= Simcoe, Ontario =

County seat and largest community in Norfolk County, Ontario, Canada

- Urban area
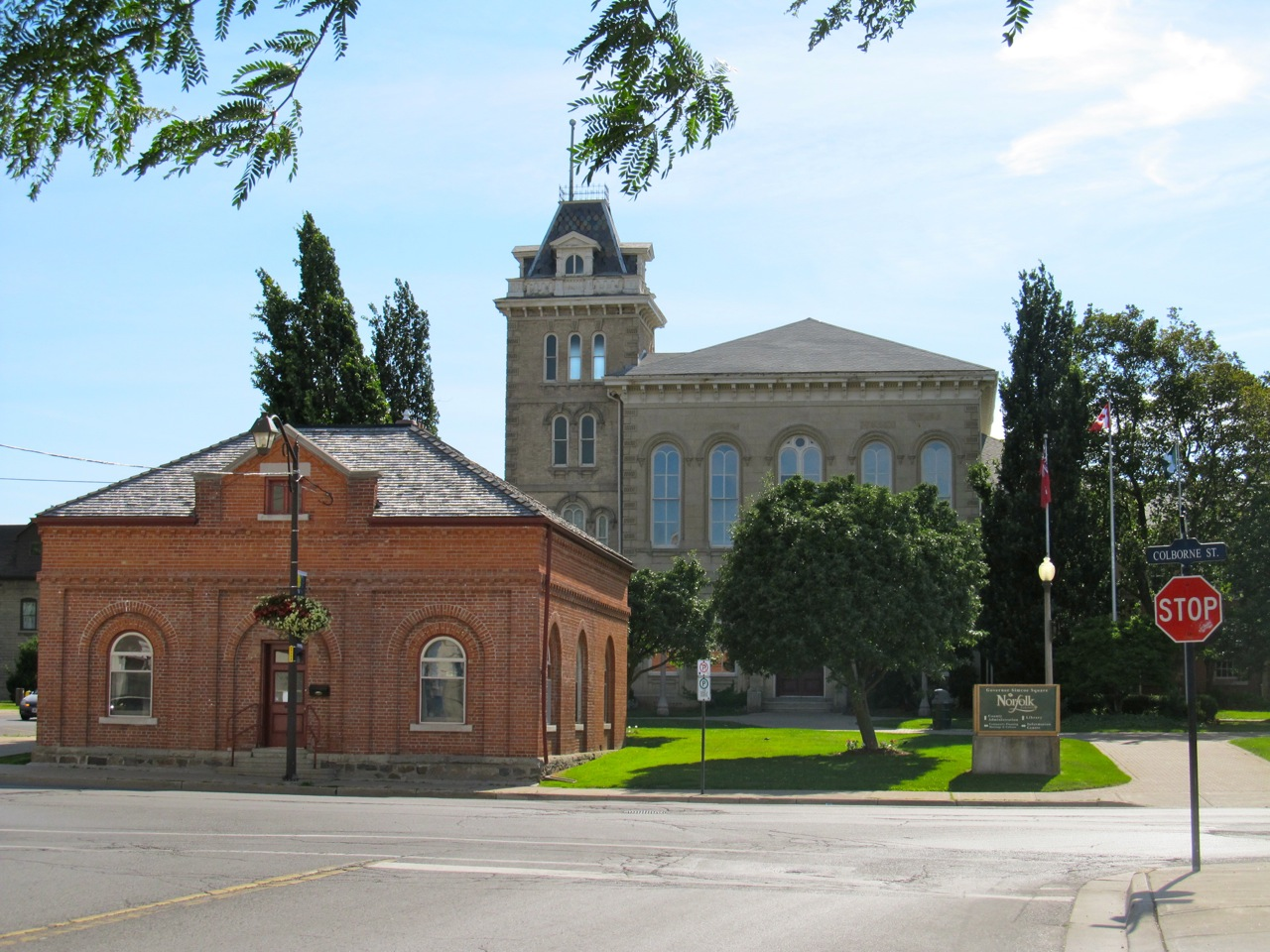
- Governor Simcoe Square – Main Offices of Norfolk County
- Motto: Ontario's Garden
- Location in southern Ontario
- Coordinates: 42°50′0″N 80°18′0″W
- Country: Canada
- Province: Ontario
- Established: 1795
- Amalgamated: 2001

Government
  - Mayor: Amy Martin
  - Governing Body: The Council of The Corporation of Norfolk County
  - MPs: Leslyn Lewis (Con)
  - MPPs: Bobbi Ann Brady (Independent)
- Elevation: 224 m (735 ft)

Population (2021)
  - Total: 16,121
- Time zone: UTC−5 (EST)
  - Summer (DST): UTC−4 (EDT)
- Forward sortation area: N3Y
- Area codes: 519 and 226
- Website: www.norfolkcounty.ca

Simcoe is an unincorporated community and former town in Southwestern Ontario, Canada near Lake Erie. It is the county seat and largest community of Norfolk County. Simcoe is at the junction of Highway 3, at Highway 24, due south of Brantford, and accessible to Hamilton by nearby Highway 6. The largest of the communities in Norfolk County, Simcoe had a population of 16,121 at the time of the 2021 Census.

== History ==
Simcoe was founded in 1795 by Lieutenant Governor John Graves Simcoe. Initially, the settlement consisted of two distinct areas, Birdtown, named by William Bird who arrived in the early 1800s and the Queensway which grew up around Aaron Culver's sawmill and grist mill in the 1820s. The post office opened in 1829 and was called Simcoe. In 1837, the village became the seat of government of the then Talbot District.

A historical plaque adds that Lieutenant-Governor Simcoe gave land to Aaron Culver in 1795 on the agreement that he would build mills; after they were in operation, a hamlet formed by 1812, although it was burned down by American troops in 1814. Between 1819 and 1823 Culver laid out a village; streets were surveyed in 1835 to 1836.

Records from 1846 indicate that the settlement was far from any major roads and had little communication with areas outside of Brantford, and that a stone court house and jail had already been built; the courthouse would be destroyed by fire in 1863 and rebuilt. There were three churches, Methodist, Baptist, and Congregationalist. A weekly newspaper is published here, the Long Point Advocate. The population was about 1,400. The post office was receiving mail daily. This settlement contained the offices of the Judge of District Court, Sheriff, Clerk of Peace, Inspector of Licenses, Crown Lands Agent, District Clerk, Treasurer, Clerk of District Court, Deputy Clerk of Crown and the Superintendent of Schools. Already operating were two grist-mills, two sawmills, a brewery, two distilleries, a foundry, a fulling mill, nine stores, six taverns, two druggists, a bank (Gore)(absorbed into Canadian Bank of Commerce) and many tradesmen.

The population in 1850 was about 1,600; in that year, Simcoe became the County seat of Norfolk County. It had increased to 2,100 by 1869 and two banks had opened.

Simcoe was incorporated as a town in 1878. In 1974, Simcoe amalgamated with part of Charlotteville, Townsend, Windham and Woodhouse townships. In 2001, the town was amalgamated with Delhi, Norfolk and half of Nanticoke to become Norfolk County.

The County passed its first tree conservation by-law in 1947. This law was revised in 2000 as a part of Norfolk County's Forestry Act. Around 350 applications for tree cutting permits are sent to Norfolk council per year. For every 100 acres of undeveloped land in Norfolk County, more than 25 of those acres are considered to be forested. Most of these forests can be found within 10 miles or 16 kilometres of downtown Simcoe and are open for exploration except during periods of heavy snow.

== Community and culture ==
One of the town's notable landmarks is the Norfolk County Carillon Memorial Tower that commemorates the lives of local soldiers who died for Canada in conflicts overseas. The Carillon Memorial Tower overlooks scenic Wellington Park, a public greenspace that includes walking paths and a waterway system with a small lake, close to the downtown core.

Simcoe's main cemetery is Oakwood Cemetery.

A cultural club for people of Croatian descent operates in the town; the formal name given to this organization is the 531st branch of the Croatian Fraternal Union. First organized by Franjo Bertovic during the 1990s, and he went on to found other Croatian Fraternal Unions throughout Canada and Croatia. Members of this fraternal benefit society refer to the club as the Simcoe Croatian Club when not in formal conversation. Expenses for sick workers in addition to their funeral expenses are often partially covered through its members' benefits.

The historic Molson Bank operated here from May 1898 until sometime in the 1920s; when the Bank of Montreal took over the building. Alterations made to the building within those decades would allow twice as much banking to take place. Fifteen more people were hired during the expansion of the bank in the early 20th century; bringing white collar jobs to the town.

Many of Simcoe's buildings feature the International style of architecture; typical of the period between 1920 and 1950 while residential buildings from the 1850s use the Gothic Revival style of architecture. The relatively tall buildings that came out of the "International" style (compared to the buildings in Simcoe prior to the 1950s) were used to make Simcoe into a more international destination for people to live, work, and admire. A couple of buildings in the downtown core even blend "International" elements with the Art Deco style of architecture; bringing bright colors and illusions of rapid movement into the building design.

The only operating alligator tugboat remaining in the world, the W.D. Stalker, is in Simcoe.

Simcoe has a radio station, 98.9 myFM, and two newspapers: The Simcoe Reformer and the Norfolk News. CHCH-DT in Hamilton is the nearest broadcast television station along with CKCO-DT in Kitchener and CIII-DT (a Toronto station with a repeater in Paris, Ontario). CHCH (channel 11 on Eastlink Cable - formerly Amtelecom Cable) is mostly a news channel while CKCO (CTV Two) and CIII (Global) offer a variety of entertainment choices during prime time (7 PM through 11 PM on weekdays).

Major local festivals include the Rotary-sponsored Friendship Festival, the Norfolk County Fair and Horse Show, and the winter light show of Panorama. Simcoe was one of the communities in Canada that relayed the Olympic torch, which travelled from Athens, Greece to Vancouver for the 21st Winter Olympic Games in Vancouver, British Columbia.

The Simcoe Santa Claus Parade has been historically held on the weekend following Remembrance Day. During the heyday of this event in the 1950s, the town would stop operating for one afternoon for people to enjoy the festivities. In recent years, the parade has held a lower profile; with people preferring "warm weather" events like the Friendship Festival and the Norfolk County Fair.

Norfolk County is one of the only regions in Canada that can support peanut production. Established in 1979 by Jim Picard Sr. and researchers from the University of Guelph, Picard went on to establish Picard's Peanuts in area.

== Climate ==
Simcoe, like all of Norfolk County, Ontario has a humid continental climate (Köppen Dfb). Winters are cold with a January average of −7.8 °C (18.0 °F) in January and most days have maximum temperatures below 0 °C (32 °F). Though winters are cold, mild stretches of weather can bring temperatures above 10 °C (50 °F) in January. The average annual snowfall is 133 centimetres (52 in), with maximum accumulations occurring in February when the snow depth is 10 centimetres (4 in). Summers are warm and humid with a July high of 27 °C (81 °F) and a July low of 15 °C (59 °F). Temperatures above 30 °C (86 °F) occur 10 days per year. The average annual precipitation is 1,010 millimetres (40 in), which is relatively evenly distributed throughout the year. Delhi averages 2021 hours of bright sunshine per year or 43% of daylight hours, ranging from a low of 21.2% in December to 62.2% in July.

The hottest day ever recorded for Simcoe was on August 28, 1973, when the local weather station registered temperatures up to 36.1 °C (97.0 °F). Simcoe's coldest ever temperatures occurred on January 18, 1976, when temperatures of −29.4 °C (−20.9 °F) were detected by local weather authorities. Traditionally, temperatures have ranged between −1.1 °C (30.0 °F) in January to 25.6 °C (78.1 °F) in July during times of moderate climate.

As a rural community, Simcoe is generally 10% drier than the major cities of Toronto, Hamilton, and Ottawa. It is also 25 times less likely to face smog-related problems between the months of June and September than metropolitan cities like London, Windsor, and Sarnia. Sunny days tend to last 15% longer; granting more needed sunlight for summer days in addition to forestalling the cold and dark winter nights.

Climate data for Simcoe (1971–2000)
| Month | Jan | Feb | Mar | Apr | May | Jun | Jul | Aug | Sep | Oct | Nov | Dec | Year |
|---|---|---|---|---|---|---|---|---|---|---|---|---|---|
| Record high °C (°F) | 18.3 (64.9) | 16.0 (60.8) | 25.0 (77.0) | 29.5 (85.1) | 33.0 (91.4) | 36.7 (98.1) | 40.6 (105.1) | 36.7 (98.1) | 36.1 (97.0) | 31.7 (89.1) | 25.0 (77.0) | 19.5 (67.1) | 40.6 (105.1) |
| Mean daily maximum °C (°F) | −2.1 (28.2) | −1.3 (29.7) | 4.4 (39.9) | 11.9 (53.4) | 19.3 (66.7) | 24.4 (75.9) | 27.0 (80.6) | 25.7 (78.3) | 20.9 (69.6) | 14.2 (57.6) | 7.2 (45.0) | 1.0 (33.8) | 12.7 (54.9) |
| Daily mean °C (°F) | −5.7 (21.7) | −5.3 (22.5) | 0.0 (32.0) | 6.6 (43.9) | 13.2 (55.8) | 18.4 (65.1) | 20.9 (69.6) | 20.0 (68.0) | 15.6 (60.1) | 9.4 (48.9) | 3.5 (38.3) | −2.5 (27.5) | 7.8 (46.0) |
| Mean daily minimum °C (°F) | −9.4 (15.1) | −9.4 (15.1) | −4.3 (24.3) | 1.2 (34.2) | 7.1 (44.8) | 12.3 (54.1) | 14.8 (58.6) | 14.2 (57.6) | 10.2 (50.4) | 4.5 (40.1) | −0.2 (31.6) | −5.9 (21.4) | 2.9 (37.2) |
| Record low °C (°F) | −33.9 (−29.0) | −30.0 (−22.0) | −25.0 (−13.0) | −15.0 (5.0) | −6.1 (21.0) | −1.7 (28.9) | 3.3 (37.9) | −0.6 (30.9) | −3.9 (25.0) | −9.4 (15.1) | −18.9 (−2.0) | −28.0 (−18.4) | −33.9 (−29.0) |
| Average precipitation mm (inches) | 70.1 (2.76) | 59.2 (2.33) | 83.1 (3.27) | 85.3 (3.36) | 83.6 (3.29) | 83.2 (3.28) | 86.1 (3.39) | 85.8 (3.38) | 98.1 (3.86) | 83.9 (3.30) | 100.1 (3.94) | 91.3 (3.59) | 1,009.8 (39.75) |
| Average rainfall mm (inches) | 36.8 (1.45) | 30.0 (1.18) | 62.3 (2.45) | 79.7 (3.14) | 83.6 (3.29) | 83.2 (3.28) | 86.1 (3.39) | 85.8 (3.38) | 98.1 (3.86) | 83.5 (3.29) | 91.1 (3.59) | 57.6 (2.27) | 877.6 (34.55) |
| Average snowfall cm (inches) | 33.3 (13.1) | 29.7 (11.7) | 20.9 (8.2) | 5.6 (2.2) | 0.1 (0.0) | 0 (0) | 0 (0) | 0 (0) | 0 (0) | 0.5 (0.2) | 9.0 (3.5) | 33.7 (13.3) | 132.7 (52.2) |
| Average precipitation days (≥ 0.2 mm) | 14.4 | 12.4 | 12.6 | 13.0 | 11.9 | 10.4 | 10.5 | 9.4 | 11.3 | 11.6 | 13.8 | 14.6 | 146.0 |
| Average rainy days (≥ 0.2 mm) | 4.6 | 4.2 | 8.4 | 11.9 | 11.9 | 10.4 | 10.5 | 9.4 | 11.3 | 11.6 | 11.6 | 7.5 | 113.2 |
| Average snowy days (≥ 0.2 cm) | 10.5 | 9.0 | 5.2 | 1.4 | 0.04 | 0 | 0 | 0 | 0 | 0.12 | 2.4 | 8.3 | 37.0 |
| Mean monthly sunshine hours | 84.0 | 98.6 | 132.3 | 189.3 | 242.5 | 272.1 | 289.1 | 251.1 | 179.1 | 139.2 | 84.3 | 59.6 | 2,021.1 |
Source: Environment Canada

== Demographics ==
Town of Simcoe
| Year | Pop. | ±% |
|---|---|---|
| 1871 | 1,856 | — |
| 1881 | 2,922 | +57.4% |
| 1891 | 2,674 | −8.5% |
| 1901 | 2,627 | −1.8% |
| 1911 | 3,227 | +22.8% |
| 1921 | 3,953 | +22.5% |
| 1931 | 5,226 | +32.2% |
| 1941 | 6,037 | +15.5% |
| 1951 | 7,269 | +20.4% |
| 1956 | 8,078 | +11.1% |
| 1961 | 8,754 | +8.4% |
| 1966 | 9,929 | +13.4% |
| 1971 | 10,793 | +8.7% |
| 1976 | 14,189 | +31.5% |
| 1981 | 14,326 | +1.0% |
| 1986 | 14,290 | −0.3% |
| 1991 | 15,539 | +8.7% |
| 1996 | 15,380 | −1.0% |
| 2001 | 14,941 | −2.9% |

Population centre
| Year | Pop. | ±% |
|---|---|---|
| 2006 | 14,522 | — |
| 2011 | 14,777 | +1.8% |
| 2016 | 13,922 | −5.8% |
| 2021 | 16,121 | +15.8% |

In the 2021 census, Simcoe had a population of 16,121 living in 7,118 of its 7,406 total private dwellings, a change of 15.8% from its 2016 population of 13,922. With a land area of 16.50 square kilometres (6.37 sq mi) it had a population density of 977/km2 (377.22 square miles) in 2021.

== Housing and neighbourhoods ==
The monthly rent of a typical apartment in Simcoe ranges from 713 Canadian dollars per month (for a bachelor apartment in a working class neighbourhood) to 1,500 Canadian dollars (for the same bachelor apartment newer and more posh neighbourhood).

The average age of a Simcoe resident as of 2011 is 48 years of age; the average male is 47 years old while the average female is 50 years old. While almost 6,000 people who living in Simcoe are legally married as of 2011, a substantial number of people who never married live in Simcoe; nearly 3,000 people in Simcoe remain single and have never been engaged in a legal or common-law marriage. English is the most spoken language in Simcoe; with Ojibway and several Eastern European languages spoken by a small minority of the residents.

== Transportation and tourism ==
In 1886 the South Norfolk Railway constructed a line from Hamilton, Ontario, to Port Rowan, Ontario, that stopped in Simcoe. The train operated until 1965. Economic considerations in addition to rising energy and fuel prices are what basically killed the train operations in Norfolk County during the latter portion of the 20th century.

A local transit program is centred around Simcoe and helps to serve the major communities of Norfolk County. It costs at least $17,000 for a budget vehicle for families in Simcoe (Toyota Corolla or any of its equivalents) and at least $19,195 for a budget vehicle for 1-2 people (Volkswagen Golf or any of its equivalents).

A country club was established in Simcoe by Duncan Campbell in 1895 called the Norfolk County Golf and Country Club. It originally excluded ladies from membership and hard liquor from being consumed until 1912 when the club was incorporated. When it first became an inclusive golf club, ladies had the "privilege" of paying $4 to access the facilities while the gentlemen had to pay a handsome $15 to be entitled to full privileges. This country club still exists and visitors are encouraged to acquire memberships before playing golf.

== Employment ==
Simcoe is on a positive trajectory of employment growth, which corresponds with their population growth in recent years. Rural Canadian towns similar to Simcoe are struggling due to economic and transportation issues that prevent people from holding meaningful employment and being prosperous. Towns like Eastend in Saskatchewan, Grey River in Newfoundland and Dollard in Saskatchewan are facing general hardships due to diminishing transportation choices, aging residents and bleak local employment opportunities. Simcoe's infrastructure and close proximity to urban markets are some of the reasons why Simcoe is not in any great economic peril within the next 30 years.

=== Manufacturing sector ===
One of the earliest manufacturers to operate in Simcoe is the West & Peachey Company, an equipment and boiler maker company that invented an amphibious steamboat called an Alligator. Known as an alligator boat, this was used by logging companies all over Eastern North America in 1878. The firm built 230 alligator tugs between 1889 and 1932.

In 1929, American Can Company began its manufacturing operations in Simcoe. During the 42 years that it was operating, this metal-can manufacturing plant employed many local residents. The Canadian Canning Company, which had been in operation in Simcoe since the 1870s, was a primary customer for some of the products of the American Can Plant, and was a producer of canned fruit, vegetable, and processed prepared foodstuffs, such as soup. This processing plant relied heavily on fruit and vegetables produced locally. In 1991, the Robinson street manufacturing plants closed. The shutdown of the plants can be partially attributed to the recession of the early 1990s. At its prime, American Can Company employed 605 male employees and 39 female employees with highly competitive wages. During the Second World War, the Simcoe plant employed many women on a full-time basis, due to the shortage of men who had gone off to fight in the war. The plant continued to produce cans for the food industry, along with specialized packaging needed for the war effort. Notable MPP Charles Strange from the historical Brantford electoral district worked at this plant in his later life and lived in Simcoe.

Small factories once were dominant in the southeastern end of Simcoe until the early 2000s, when high-wage manufacturing jobs started to be outsourced to low-wage regions like China, Bangladesh, and Singapore, which was a prevalent trend across Ontario. In 2011, Statistics Canada estimated that 11.1% of Simcoe's labour force is employed in the manufacturing industry, slightly higher than the province average of 10.2%. In 2018, Toyotetsu announced a multi-million dollar expansion of their manufacturing facilities in Simcoe. Their first manufacturing plant in the northwestern end of Simcoe, built in 2006, employs approximately 170 full-time personnel in metal parts stamping and fabrication for the automotive industry. Since their inception, Toyotetsu has steadily expanded their production facilities in the community.

== Health ==
There are 24 physicians who practice within the city limits. Most of the doctors do not accept new patients, with the exception of the terminally ill, pregnant women, and their families. This situation is expected to clear itself within five to ten years.

Simcoe is home to the Norfolk General Hospital; it is the only hospital in Norfolk County.

Norfolk General Hospital is the governing agency for Holmes House. Operating since 1989, Holmes House has been operating across the street from Norfolk General Hospital. It provides services to help recovering drug addicts manage their addiction using a co-education detoxification program. Applicants over 16 years old are accepted and the facility does not provide medicinal treatment for withdrawal symptoms.

There are many other social health and welfare programs available in Simcoe that benefit all residents of the community. Some are available from organizations such as Haldimand-Norfolk Women's Services near downtown Simcoe.

== Notable people ==
=== Arts ===
- Bruce McCall, a Canadian illustrator and author, best known for his frequent contributions to The New Yorker especially covers for the magazine. In his memoir, Thin Ice (1997), McCall recounts his childhood years in Simcoe.
- Stella Asling-Riis, novelist and writer, was born in Simcoe.
- Deborah Ellis, the recipient of the Governor General's Award, the Jane Addams Children's Book Award, the Vicky Metcalf Award for a body of work, an ALA Notable, and the Children's Africana Book Award Honor Book for Older Readers, lives in Simcoe.
- Ronald Beckett, a Canadian composer, conductor, choir director, and the founder/ artistic director of the Arcady Ensemble.

=== Education ===
- R. Scott Bakker, Canadian fantasy author
- David Strangway, Canadian geophysicist

=== Entertainment ===
- Rick Danko (d. 1999), musician (Ronnie Hawkins, The Band)
- Terry Danko, musician (Ronnie Hawkins, Atkinson, Danko and Ford, Bearfoot; session musician with George Harrison, Stephen Stills, Eric Clapton and Bob Dylan amongst others)
- Margo Davidson (d. 2008), musician (The Parachute Club)

=== Military ===
- James Sutherland Brown, senior staff officer in the Canadian Expeditionary Force in the First World War, wrote a contingency plan to invade and occupy northern United States.

=== Politics ===
- Reed Elley, Member of Parliament for Nanaimo—Cowichan
- Alexander M. Hardy, United States Congressman
- Eric Hoskins, Member of Provincial Parliament and Ontario cabinet minister
- Arthur Slaght, Member of the Canadian House of Commons

=== Science ===
- Alfred H. Bell (1895–1977), petroleum geologist

=== Sports ===
- John Axford, baseball player
- Rob Blake, hockey player
- Annaleise Carr, swimmer
- Jassen Cullimore, hockey player
- Red Kelly, hockey player
- Ryan Lindsay, hockey player
- Andrew Penner, hockey player
- Dwayne Roloson, hockey player
- Jack Roxburgh, president of the Canadian Amateur Hockey Association and the Ontario Hockey Association, member of parliament for Norfolk
- H. J. Sterling, president of the Canadian Amateur Hockey Association and the Thunder Bay Amateur Hockey Association
- Ryan VandenBussche, hockey player
- Rick Wamsley, hockey player
- Sean Jamieson, baseball player
