= Parkdale Collegiate Institute =

Secondary school in Toronto, Ontario, Canada

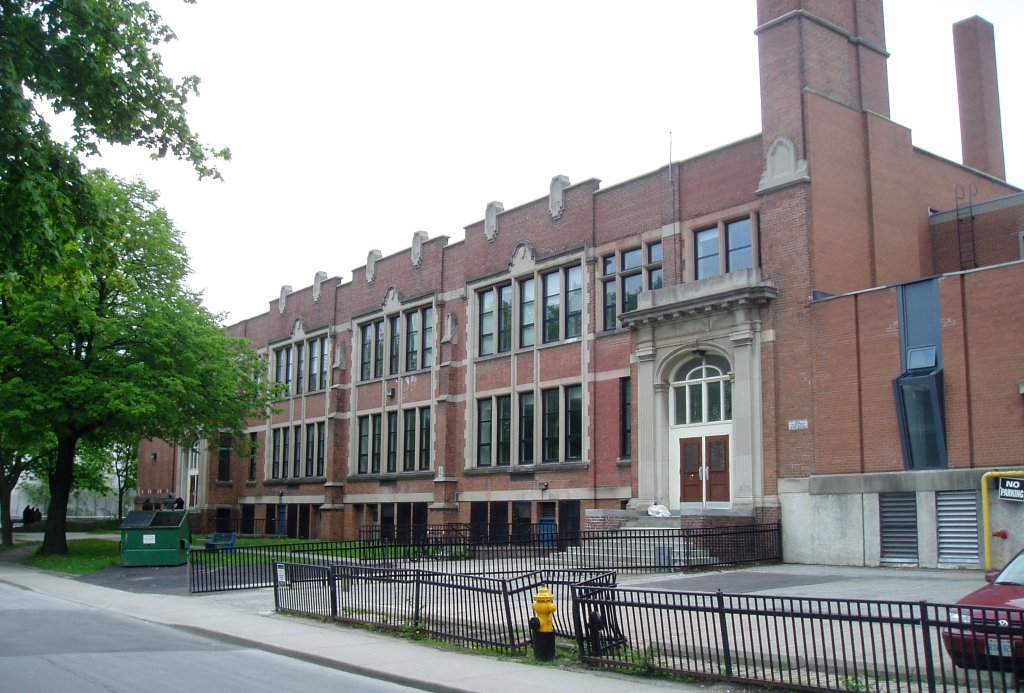

Location
- 209 Jameson Avenue; Toronto, Ontario, M6K 2Y3; Canada; 43°38′22.73″N 79°26′10.38″W

Information
- Former names: Jameson Avenue High School (1888–1890); Jameson Avenue Collegiate Institute (1890–1910)
- School type: High school IB World School
- Motto: Let Knowledge Grow From More To More
- Founded: 1888
- School board: Toronto District School Board (Toronto Board of Education)
- Superintendent: Debbie Donsky
- Area trustee: Debbie King
- Principal: Terrol Sinclair
- Grades: 9–12
- Enrolment: 535 (2019-20)
- Language: English
- Colors: Red, Gold, and Black
- Mascot: Panther
- Nickname: Parkdale Panthers
- Website: schoolweb.tdsb.on.ca/parkdale/

Parkdale Collegiate Institute (PCI), previously known as Jameson Avenue High School and Jameson Avenue Collegiate Institute is a public high school located on Jameson Avenue in Toronto, Ontario, Canada. The school is a member of the Toronto District School Board. From its opening until 1998, it was part of the former Toronto Board of Education.

Founded in 1888, Parkdale is located in the neighbourhood of Parkdale, a former village on its own. A multicultural district, the location is in the heart of what is considered 'Little Tibet', which is the home of the largest concentration of Tibetans in the city.

== History ==
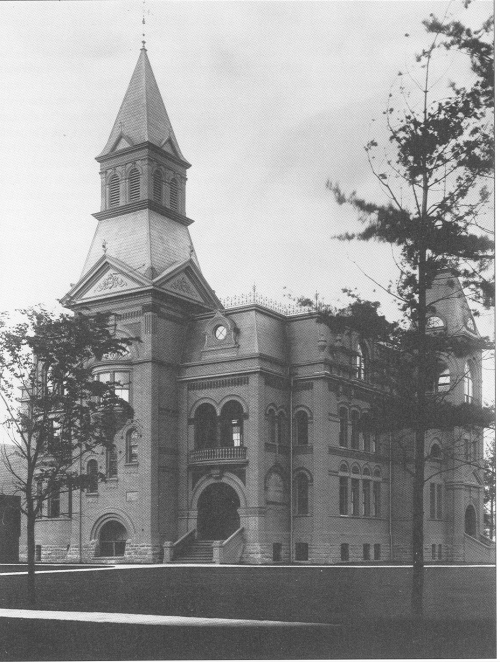
Original Parkdale High School

Parkdale High School opened in the Masonic Hall on Dowling Avenue in 1888. When the town of Parkdale was annexed to the City of Toronto a year later in 1889, Parkdale High School moved to its new residence on Jameson Avenue where it became the Jameson Avenue Collegiate Institute, and later the Jameson Collegiate Institute. In 1910, the school was renamed to its present name of Parkdale Collegiate Institute. The original building served until 1928 and then demolished while the school moved to the present Collegiate Gothic structure which was completed in 1929. The school has had two additions, the most recent in the 1960s. Parkdale Collegiate Institute is the second oldest secondary school in the City of Toronto.

Parkdale Collegiate Institute is a certified International Baccalaureate World School which began in April 2007. It currently offers the IB Preparation Programs for Grade 9 and 10 and the IB Diploma Programme for Grade 11 and 12.

One of the first teachers was Nellie Spence, one of the first female secondary school teachers in Toronto, who taught English and History at Parkdale from 1888 until she retired in 1929. The Nellie Spence Archive Room in the school containing memorabilia and local history is named after her.

This year's Senior Girls' Volleyball team were the Toronto AA representatives at OFSAA. The Senior Boys Volleyball team were the Toronto AA representatives at OFSAA for the 2014–2015 season which was held in Northern Ontario.

In the 1976 Summer Olympic Games in Montreal, three Parkdalians participated as members of the Canadian Olympic team, Marvin Nash in the 100 metres, Bishop Dolegiewicz in discus and George Tintor in rowing.

== Notable staff ==
- Ivor Wynne, teacher and later director of athletics at McMaster University

== Notable alumni ==
- Stella Asling-Riis, novelist and clubwoman
- Bonnie Dobson, folk singer and songwriter
- Dallas Good, musician in the Sadies
- Fred Gardiner - lawyer, politician, Metropolitan Toronto chairman
- Grace Irwin - novelist and teacher
- William Krehm - author, journalist, political activist, real estate developer
- Chemi Lhamo - human rights activist
- Leon Major - theatre and opera director, artistic director, educator
- Anne Mroczkowski - television reporter and news anchor
- Norma Renault - stage, television and film actress
- Goody Rosen - professional baseball player
- Charles Templeton - media figure, Christian evangelist

== See also ==
- Education in Ontario
- List of secondary schools in Ontario
