= Alligator boat =

Amphibious vehicle

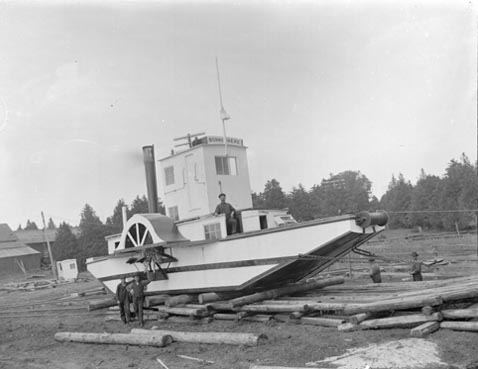
Alligator tug Bonnechere, 1907

Alligator tugs were a type of amphibious vehicle used in the forestry industry throughout Ontario, Quebec, the Maritime provinces of Canada and the northern United States from the mid-19th century to the beginning of the 20th century. These tugs were so named because of their ability to travel between lakes by pulling themselves with a winch across land. Alligators served as a "warping tug". They towed log booms across lakes and then portaged themselves using a winch to the next body of water. The rugged, steam-powered tugs were one of the pioneers in the mechanization of the forest industry in North America.

== History ==
Various companies built amphibious tugs for logging, but the most successful line of the tugs which came to be known as "alligators" were designed and patented in Canada in the late 1880s, a notable example of Ontario's early industrial era. Most were built by West & Peachey of Simcoe, Ontario. In 1878, Joseph Jackson, a North Ontario country logging businessman, approached the firm West & Peachey Company of Simcoe, makers of boilers, steam engines and logging equipment, to help him solve a problem with hauling large log booms across lakes and slow moving rivers. John Ceburn West traveled north to see Jackson's loggers at work and began to sketch and develop a plan. West & Peachey presented their idea to Mr. Jackson who then commissioned the building of a prototype. West & Peachey built 230 alligator tugs between 1889 and 1932 for customers across Ontario, Quebec, Manitoba, the Yukon and the northern United States from Maine to Wisconsin. One was shipped in pieces to be assembled in Colombia in South America. The largest alligator was the Mistango built by Captain John A. Clark for service on Lake Nipissing which was over 66 feet in length and required a crew of eleven. They were used for more than thirty years and were ubiquitous in northern Ontario until eclipsed by the Russel Tug warping tugs built by the Russel Brothers Company in Owen Sound, Ontario.

== Design and construction ==
Alligators were scow-shaped, shallow-draft tugs, fitted with side-mounted paddle wheels, powered by a 20-horsepower steam engine and provided with a cable winch and large anchor. By using the winch Alligators could pull themselves over land, around portages and up as much as a 20-degree incline at the rate of 1 to 2 1/2 miles per day. They could haul a boom of some 60,000 logs across water against all but the strongest winds. They were heavily but simply built, making rebuilding and repair easy. Alligators began with paddle wheel propulsion. Later versions used screw propellers and diesel engines in place of steam.

These tugs enabled access to the upper reaches of the Ottawa River and its many tributaries. The Alligator tug extended the social and economic stability provided by the timber industry and supported the populating of this vast region. Alligators of the North is a wonderful touchstone for all who share this heritage.

— Mary Campbell, mayor of McNab-Braeside Township, Renfrew County

== Preserved examples ==
The only currently operating alligator tug is the W.D. Stalker located in Simcoe, Ontario. A static alligator, William M. is preserved at the logging museum in Algonquin Park. Another, named Fairy Blonde is preserved at the Wakami Lake Provincial Park near Chapleau, Ontario. An Alligator tugboat called the Missinaibi is on display in the Canadian Museum of Civilization. Surviving remains of an alligator tug have been the subject of a contested restoration effort in Northern Ontario between the Connaught and District Historical Society and another interest group. The abandoned remains of another alligator can be found on a small island in Catfish Lake in Algonquin Park.

== Photographs ==
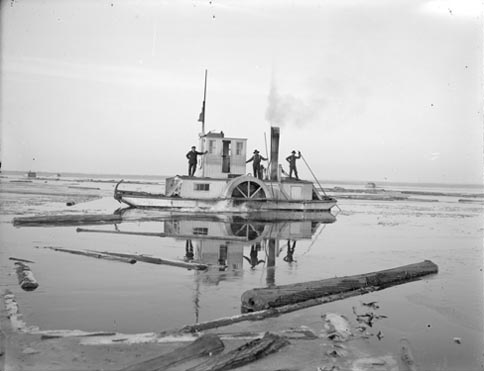
Alligator tug Amable du Fond, c. 1900

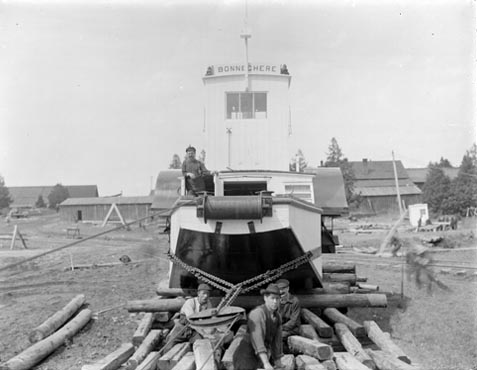
Bow view of Bonnechere, 1907

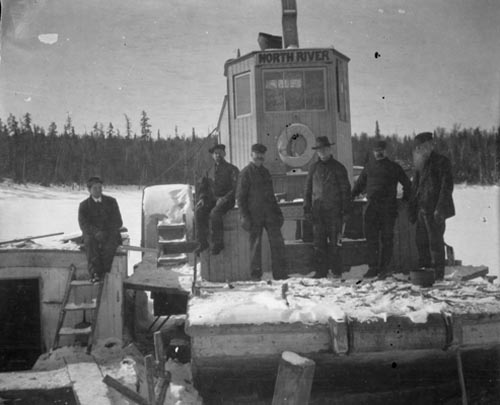
Alligator tug North River, 1905

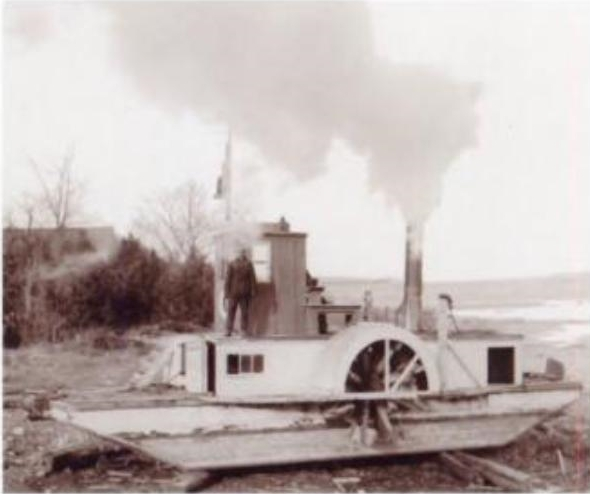
Alligator tug steams up in the Muskoka area

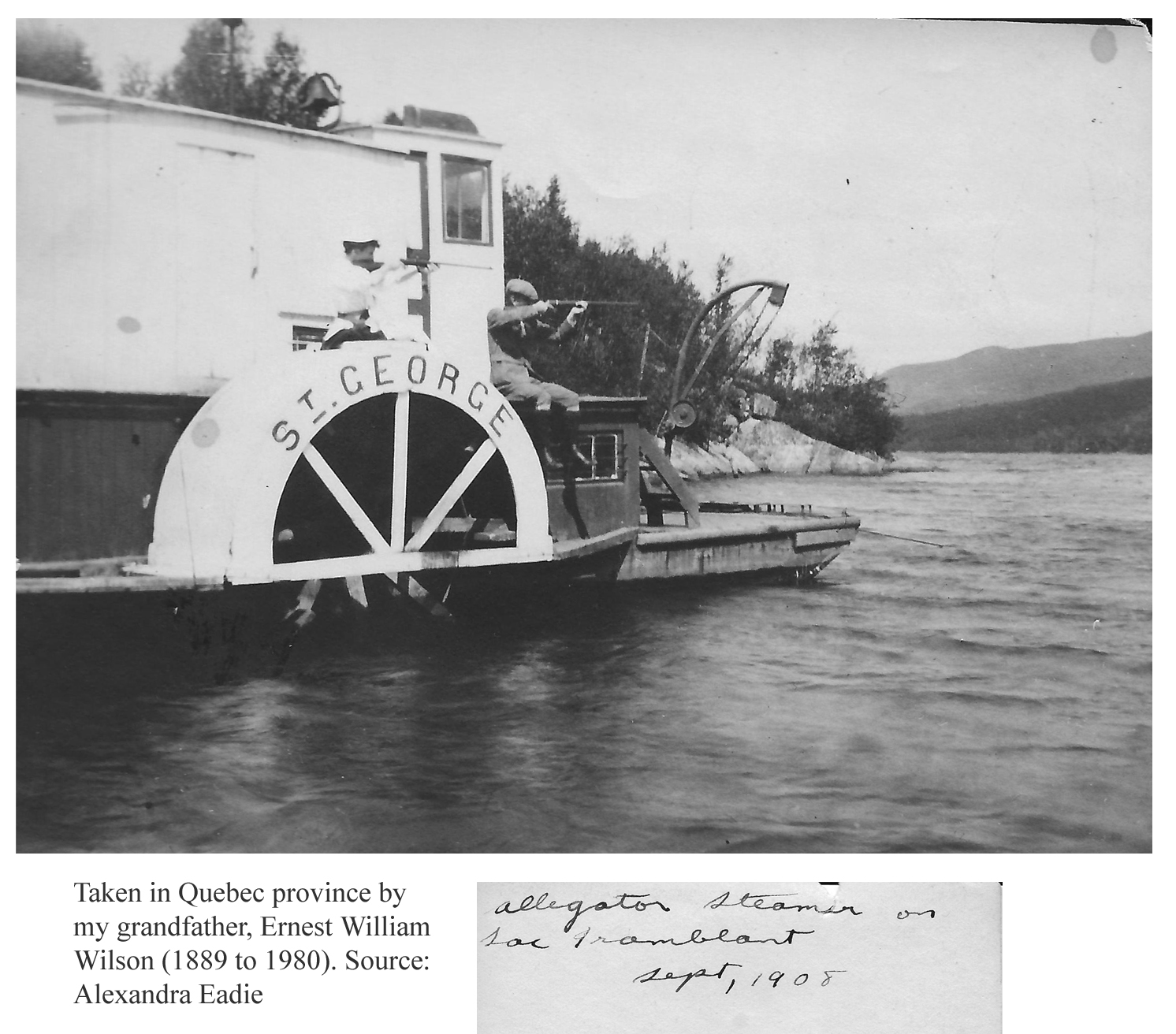
Alligator, St. George, on Lac Tremblant, Quebec, 1908

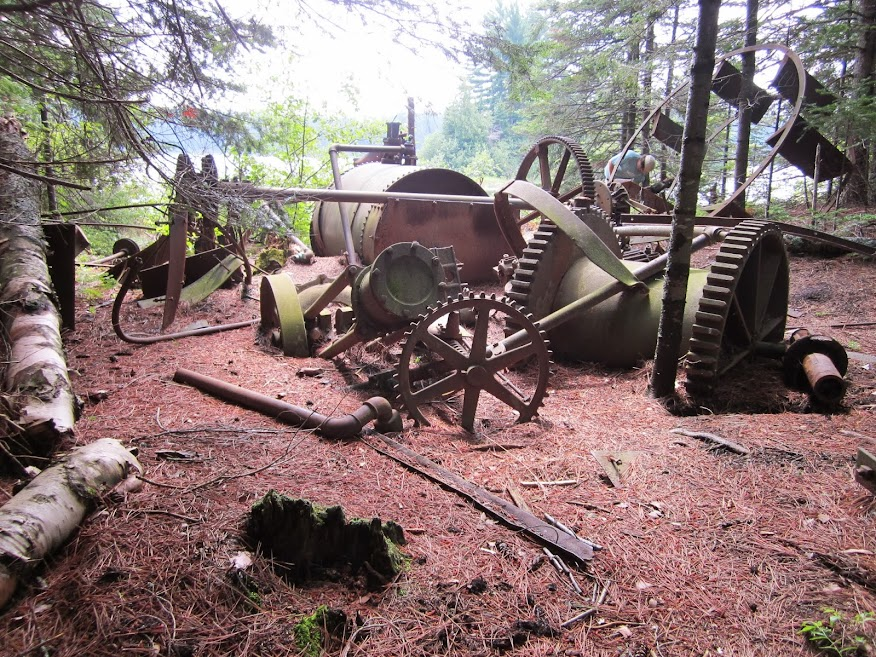
Abandoned Alligator Algonquin Park, Ontario, 2013
