= Japanese-style peanuts =

Floured deep-fried peanuts

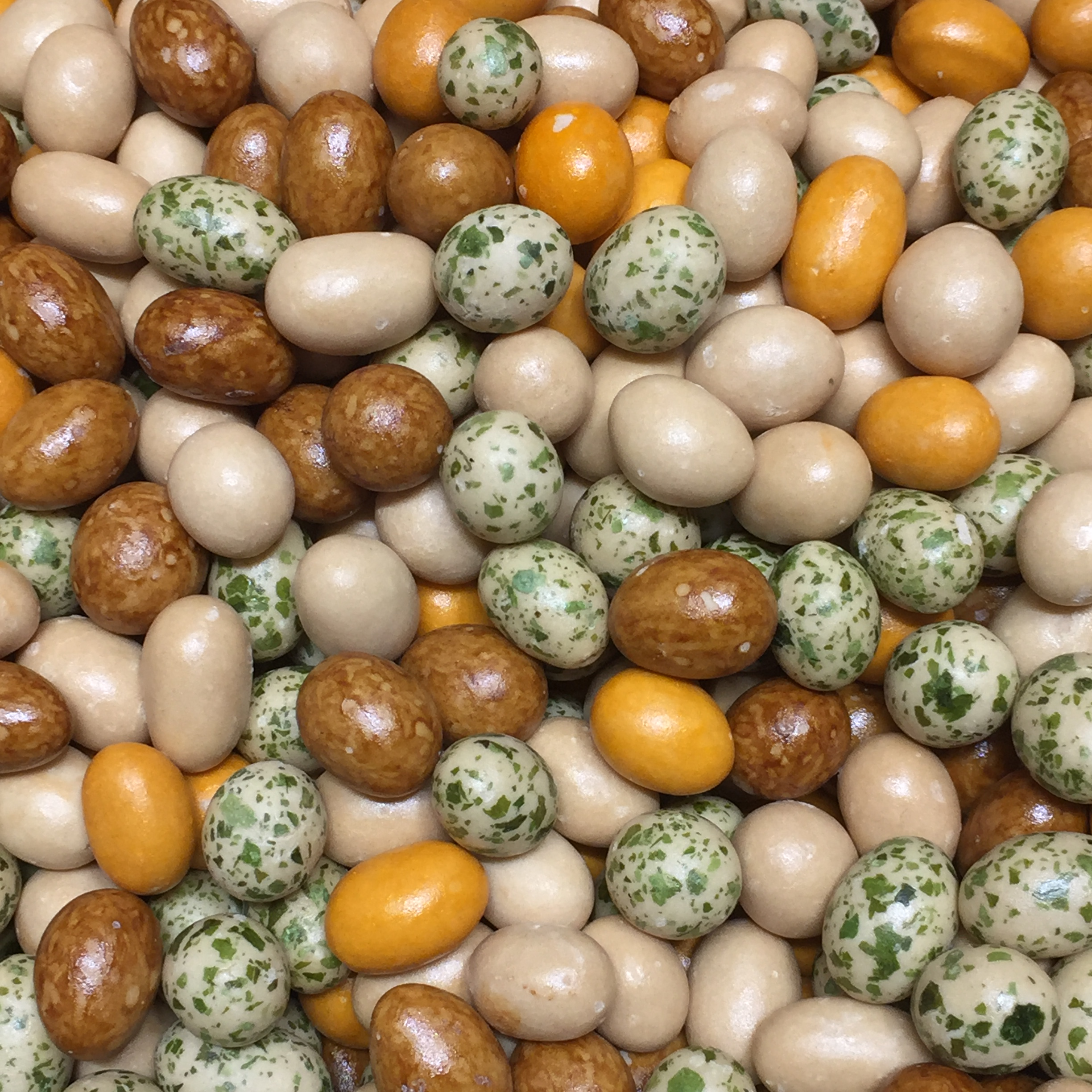
- Alternative names: Japanese peanuts Cracker nuts Cacahuate japonés Cacahuates japoneses Maní japonés
- Type: Snack
- Place of origin: Mexico
- Created by: Yoshihei Nakatani
- Invented: 1940s
- Main ingredients: Peanuts, wheat flour

Japanese-style peanuts are a type of snack food invented in Mexico, made from peanuts that are coated in a wheat flour dough and then fried or roasted. They are also known as Japanese peanuts, cracker nuts, or snacking peanuts in English, cacahuates japoneses or maní japonés in Spanish, and by various other names in different countries. They come in a variety of different flavors. The Mexican version's recipe for the extra-crunchy shell has ingredients such as wheat flour, soy sauce, water, sugar, monosodium glutamate, and citric acid. The snacks are often sold in sealed bags, but can also be found in bulk containers.

== History ==
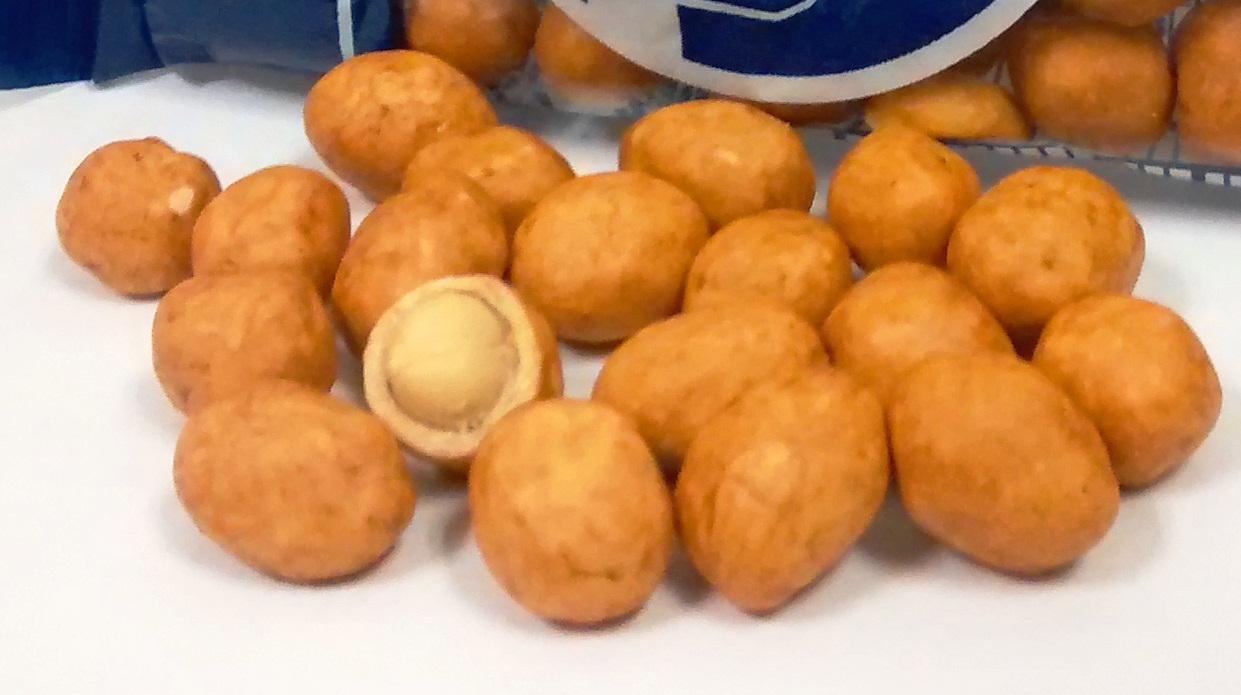

Japanese-style peanuts were created in Mexico during the 1940s by Japanese immigrant Yoshihei Nakatani, the father of Yoshio and Carlos Nakatani. He lost his job after the mother-of-pearl button factory he worked at, named El Nuevo Japón, was forced to close after its proprietor came under suspicion of being a spy for the Empire of Japan.

Nakatani had to find alternatives to provide for his family. He obtained a job at La Merced Market, where he initially sold Mexican candies called muéganos. Later, he developed a new variety of fried snacks he named oranda after the like-named fish. He also created a new version of a snack that reminded him of his homeland, mamekashi (seeds covered with a layer of flour with spices), that he adapted to Mexican tastes. Nakatani sold them in packages decorated with a geisha design made by his daughter Elvia. While his children tended to the family business, Nakatani and his wife Emma sold the snacks on local streets. Sales of the snacks were so successful that Nakatani was able to obtain his own stall at the market. With the help of Nakatani's son Armando, the family established their business under the brand Nipón in the 1950s; the name was registered as a trademark in 1977.

Nakatani never registered the patent for the snack. As a result, various competitors made their own versions of Japanese-style peanuts. Nakatani's company Nipón remained independent until it was sold to Totis in 2017.

== Similar foods ==
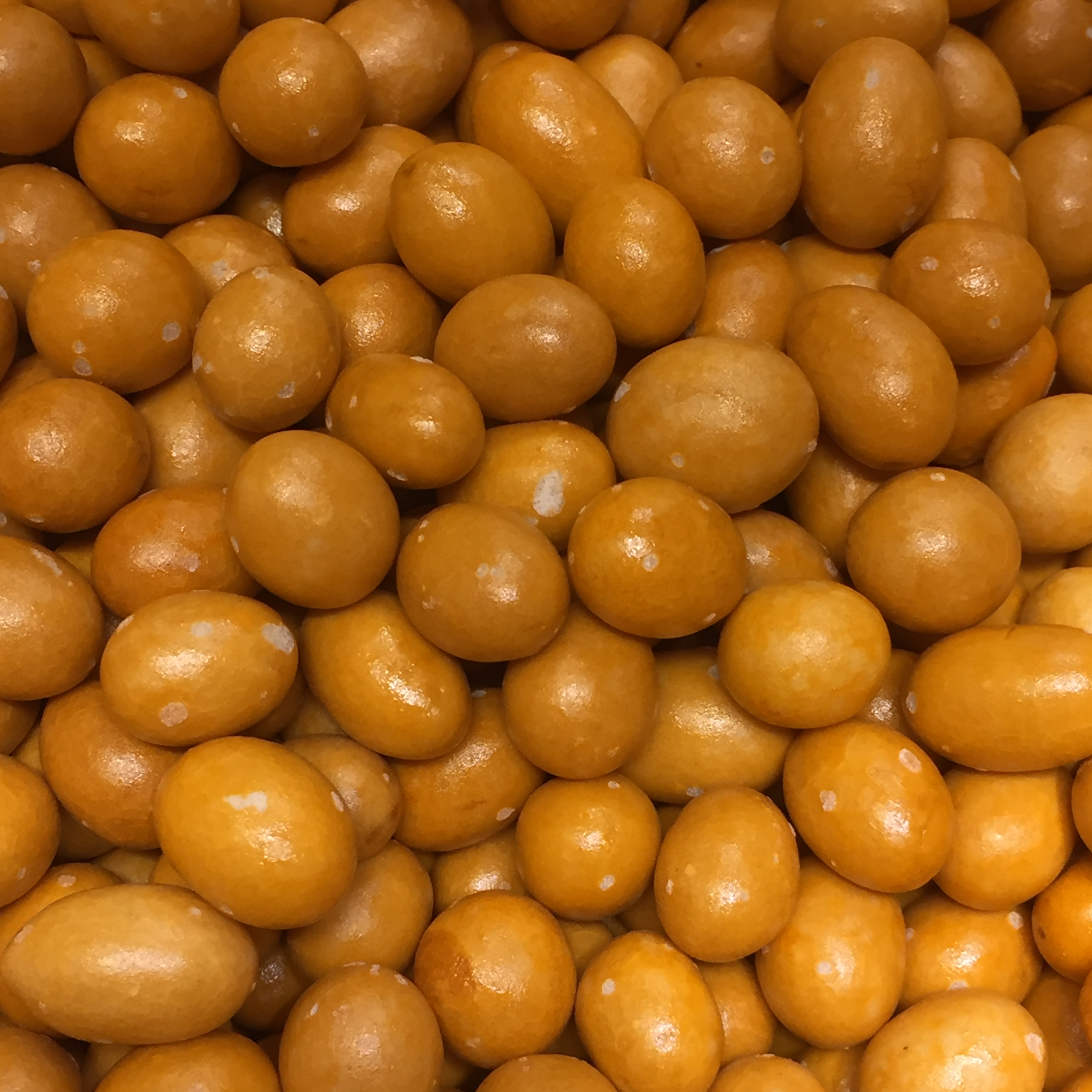

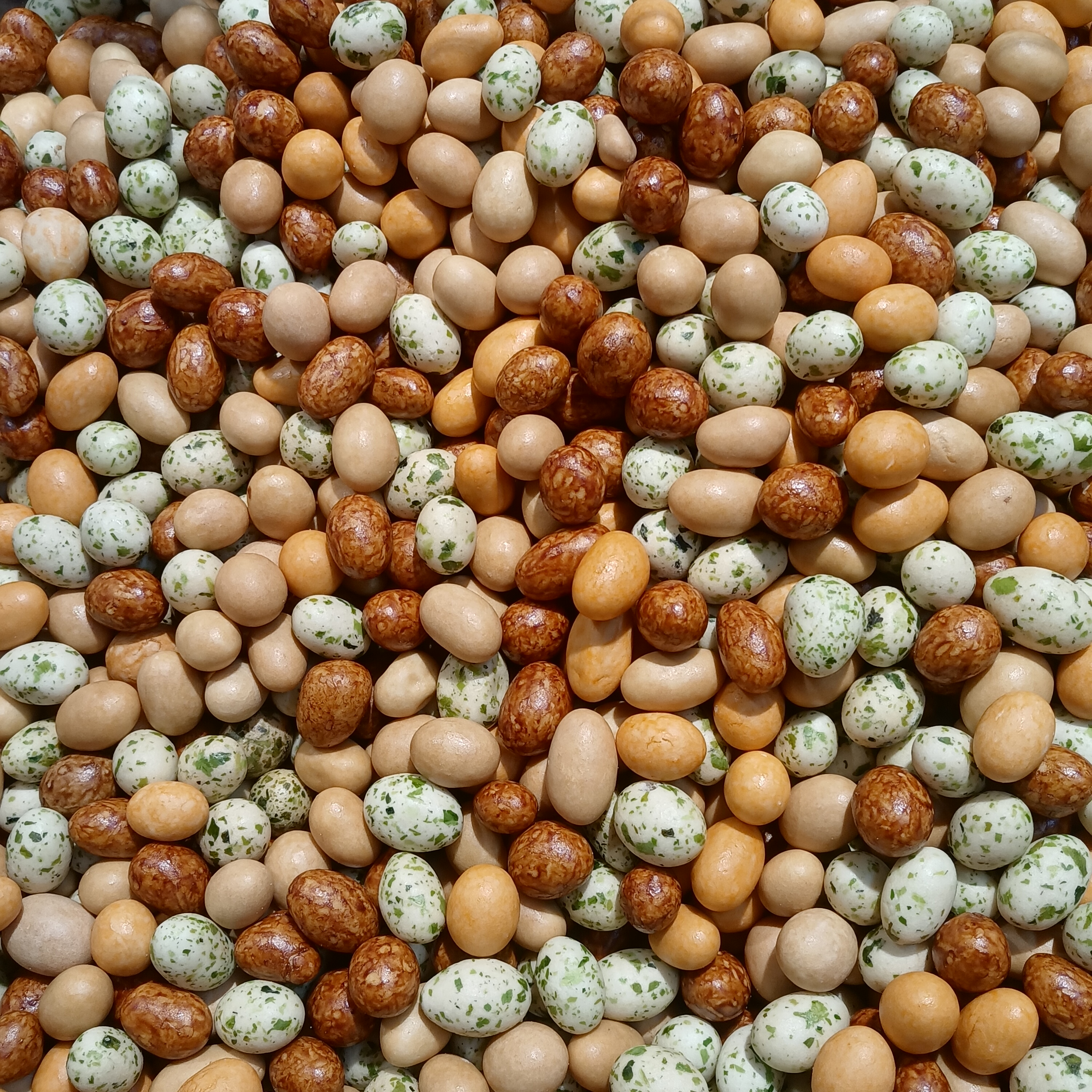

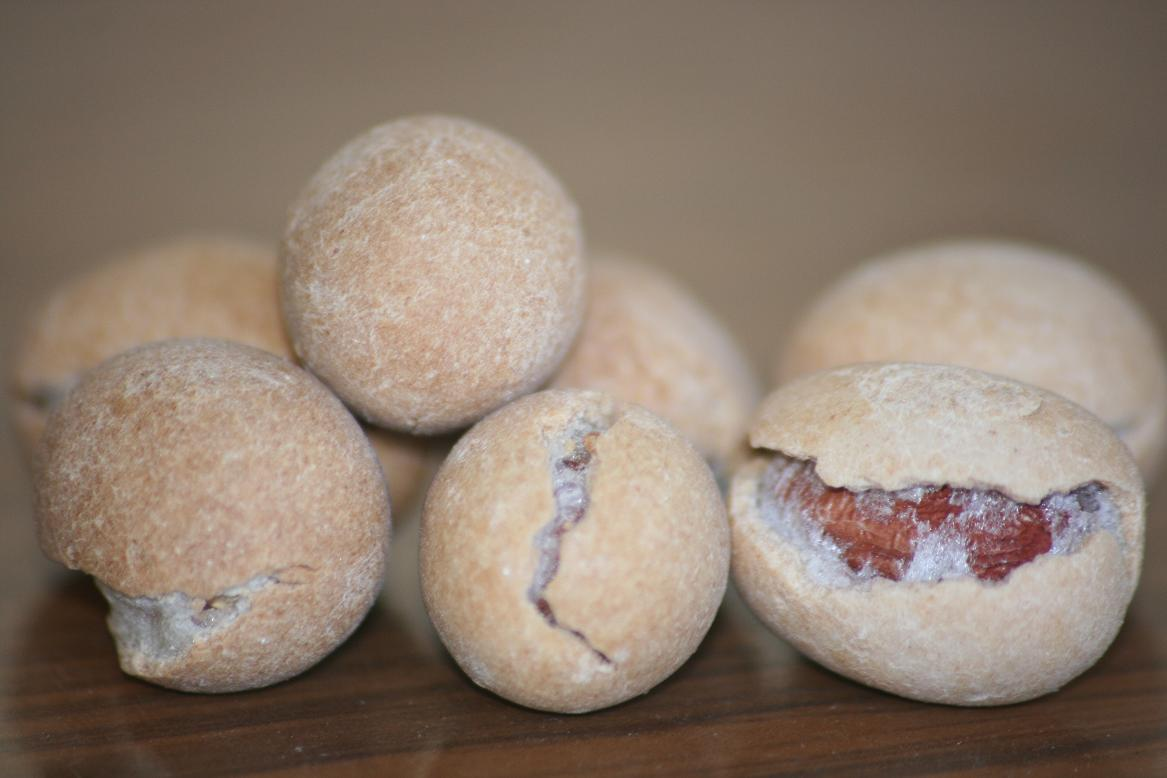

Chinese Indonesian Frans Go established the Netherlands based company Go & Zoon (later Go-Tan) and began manufacturing borrelnootjes, peanuts coated in a crisp starch-based shell, under the name Katjang Shanghai (Shanghai nuts) in the 1950s. In China, the snack is often called "fish-skin peanuts".

Thai snack food company Mae-Ruay started producing peanuts fried in a wheat flour-based batter flavoured with coconut cream under the brand name Koh-Kae in 1976.

An identical product is sold in Lebanon under the name "krikri" or "kri-kri" peanuts.

In Israel they are known as "American peanuts" (Hebrew: בוטנים אמריקאים, botnim Amerikaim).

The term "cracker nuts" was first used by the Philippine brand Nagaraya in 1968.

A Japanese version originated in Okinawa, called Takorina, has the image of a Mexican charro in the bag, and it is claimed to be called "Mexican-style peanuts", though the rumour has been disproven.

Picard's Peanuts is a Canadian company that produces Chip Nuts, a snack food brand consisting of peanuts that have a potato chip coating. Various flavors of potato chips are used in the product's production.

In Hawaii, a product similar to the Nakatani Mexican style is sold as "Iso Peanuts", with a more soy-sauce influenced flavor in a wheat‑flour shell. It is often sold by Enjoy Snacks, Aloha Gourmet, Jade Food, among others.

A spicy version is known in Indian cuisine as Gupshup or Gup shup peanuts (literally meaning "gossip"), and are distributed internationally by companies such as Haldiram and Bikaji.

== See also ==
- Beer Nuts
- Borrelnootje
- Kaki no tane
- Koh-Kae
- List of snack foods
- Nagaraya
- Want Want
