= Borrelnootje =

Nut encased in a crispy coating

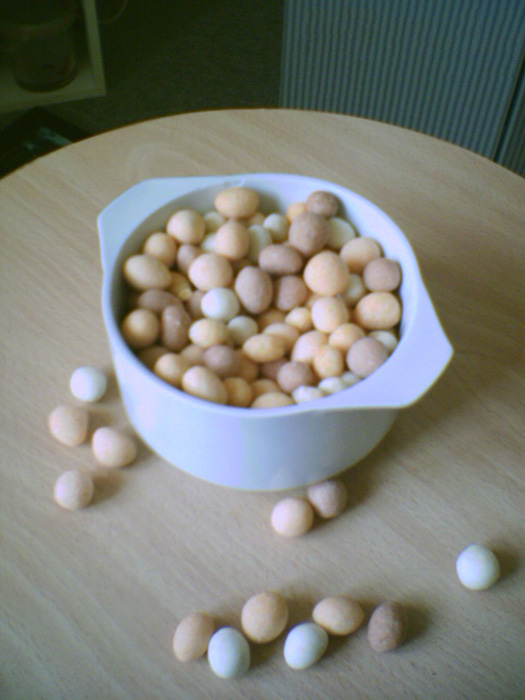
Cocktail nuts

A borrelnootje (Dutch pronunciation; English: roughly "cocktail nut") is a nut (often a peanut) with a crispy coating surrounding it, usually with a herbal flavour. It is mainly consumed in the Netherlands.

== Origin ==
In the 1950s, the company Go & Zoon (later Go-Tan) made peanuts with a crispy outside. They marketed it as "Katjang Shanghai". This family-owned company introduced the nuts from Indonesia, where it is known as katjang pedas (spicy peanuts). The nuts were imitated by companies such as Calvé and Duyvis. Calvé paid patent rights to Go-Tan for the idea of mass-producing the nuts, whilst Duyvis invented their way of production.

== Preparation ==
The layer around the cocktail nut consists mainly of starch. Depending on which type of nut, the nut will often be loose from the surround layer. This phenomenon could be a result of dough surrounding the nut rising, or due to moisture in the dough evaporating causing a decrease in volume.

== Variations ==
The cocktail nut comes in several variations:

- The simplest cocktail nut, with a white layer, containing mainly garlic. Originally this variant was called the sjanghainootje. The current cocktail nuts are colour and taste variants of this.
- The tiger nut: cocktail nut of which the crispy layer has several colours. This variant was developed in the mid-1990s.
- The Japanese cocktail nut: nut with a smooth, hard layer that can be found in the Japanese mix. These are somewhat sweet in taste.
- The oriental cocktail nut: cocktail nut curry, cumin, onion, garlic and coriander.

Besides this, since the beginning of the twenty-first century, there are packages with a mixed assortment of cocktail nuts.

== See also ==
- Japanese-style peanuts
