= Carlos Nakatani =

Mexican artist (1934–2004)

Carlos Nakatani (Mexico City 1934 – Mexico City February 2, 2004) was a painter, sculptor, cinematographer and writer, the son of a Japanese immigrant to Mexico noted for his introduction of a snack simply called “Japanese peanuts” in Mexico City, and older brother of singer Yoshio. Nakatani is best known for his painting, which mixes Mexican and Japanese influences, as part of a generation of artists which broke with the Mexican art establishment from the early 20th century. Reclusive, he nonetheless won a number of recognitions for his work and was a member of the Salón de la Plástica Mexicana.

== Life ==
Carlos Nakatani was born in the La Merced neighborhood of Mexico City in 1934 to a Mexican mother, Ema Avíla Espinoza and Yoshigei Nakatani Moriguchi, who immigrated to Mexico from Japan. His father made his fortune with the creation of a peanut snack called "cacahuates japoneses" (Japanese peanuts), which he originally sold in the La Merced market and later established the Nipon company. These peanuts remain popular in the Mexican capital to this day. While valuing his Latin heritage through his life by enjoying the capital’s nightlife from the 1950s to 1970s and reading Latin American authors such as José Lezama Lima throughout his life, but of Carlos’ brothers and sisters, he was the most influenced by his Asian heritage.

Nakatani was called “hermanito” (little brother) by his artistic contemporaries, especially Gilberto Aceves Navarro . He was reclusive and ascetic, eating only what he needed to live and bought very little. He married Mercedes Martínez with whom he had two daughters, Mayra, an art dealer and Carla, an actress.

Nakatani died on February 2, 2004, at age 70 after suffering a heart attack in his home. Three weeks before this, he predicted his death, telling Navarro. Karla dedicated a theatrical performance to him after his death.

== Career ==
Nakatani’s artistic career included cinema and writing along with the visual arts. Shortly before he took up painting, he created a black-and-white film he wrote and directed a 1967 drama about his father called “Yoshio.” His other cinematic works include “Una proxima luna” in 1965 and La Excursion, starring Graciela Lara, José Luis Loman, Rocio Lance, Rafael Espinosa, Ruben Islas and Marta Aura.

He wrote two novels. “Papá extranjero” (Foreign Dad) is about his relationship with his father. The other novel consists of 400 poems and manuscripts which narrate the life of Mozart .

However, Nakatani is best known for his painting. From 1956 to 1992, he exhibited his work individually and collectively in Mexico, the United States, Cuba, Guatemala, France, Yugoslavia, Switzerland, Australia and New Zealand and other countries. His work can be found in the permanent collections of the Palacio de Bellas Artes and the National Library in Paris . At the time of his death, he was working on a series of eighty paintings to be exhibited at the José Luis Cuevas Museum in Mexico City. Only sixteen of these were finished and were included in a retrospective held at the same museum nine months after his demise under the title of “Tanta melancholia” (So much melancholy) . He has had one major exhibition posthumously at the Museo Universitario del Chopo in Mexico City as part of an exhibition of Japanese-Mexican artists and Japanese artists in Mexico.

His awards include Salón Nacional de Grabado de la Plástica Mexicana in 1976, the Premio Salvatore Rosa in engraving and watercolor and the L’Arengario Prize in Rome. He was also a member of the Salón de la Plástica Mexicana.

== Artistry ==
Nakatani was a painter, engraver, sculptor and cinematographer noted for his use of color. Nakatani’s work is classified with that of the Generación de la Ruptura as it broke with the established traditions of the first half of the 20th century. He was nearly self-taught. He originally used water-based pigments then switched to oils.

His artwork was characterized by its delicacy, sobriety and subtlety according to art critic Teresa del Conde, mixing Japanese and Mexican influences. His works show influence from Japanese landscape and other Asian painting, with his paintings often having large empty spaces with tranquil colors. His paintings contain few human forms although humanity is suggested through his depictions of nature.
