= Picard's Peanuts =

Canadian snack food company

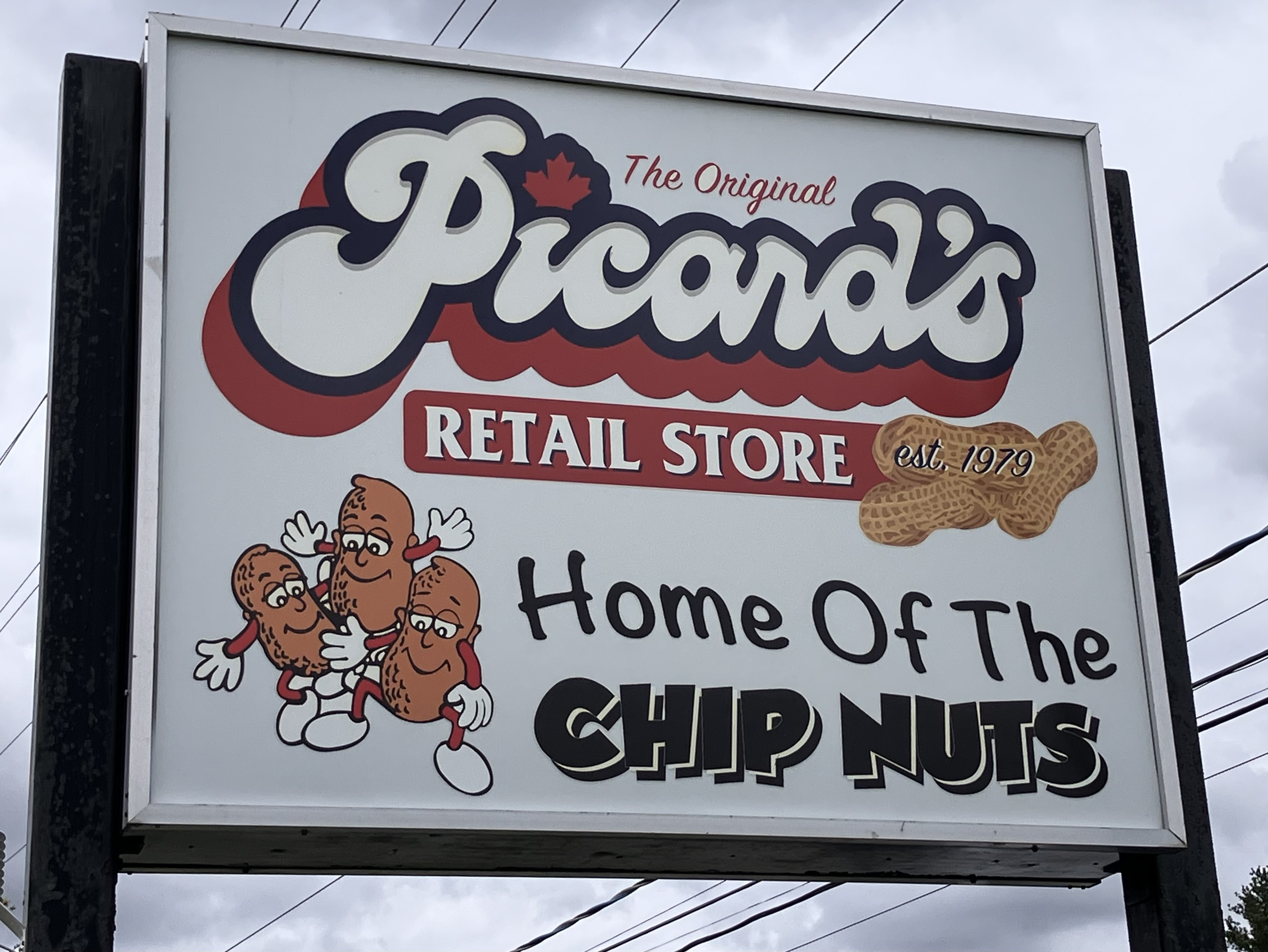
- The sign outside of the Fonthill, Ontario location
- Type: Private
- Industry: Snack foods
- Founded: 1979; 47 years ago in Simcoe, Ontario, Canada
- Founder: Jim Picard Sr.
- Headquarters: Windham, Ontario
- Products: Peanuts and Chip Nuts
- Owner: Jim Picard Jr.
- Website: picardpeanuts.com

Picard Peanuts Ltd, doing business as Picard's Peanuts, is a Canadian snack food company operating since 1979. It is one of the only retail sellers of Canadian-grown peanuts in Canada. Its owner, Jim Picard Sr., pioneered peanut farming in Canada by establishing peanut production in Norfolk County, Ontario.

== History ==
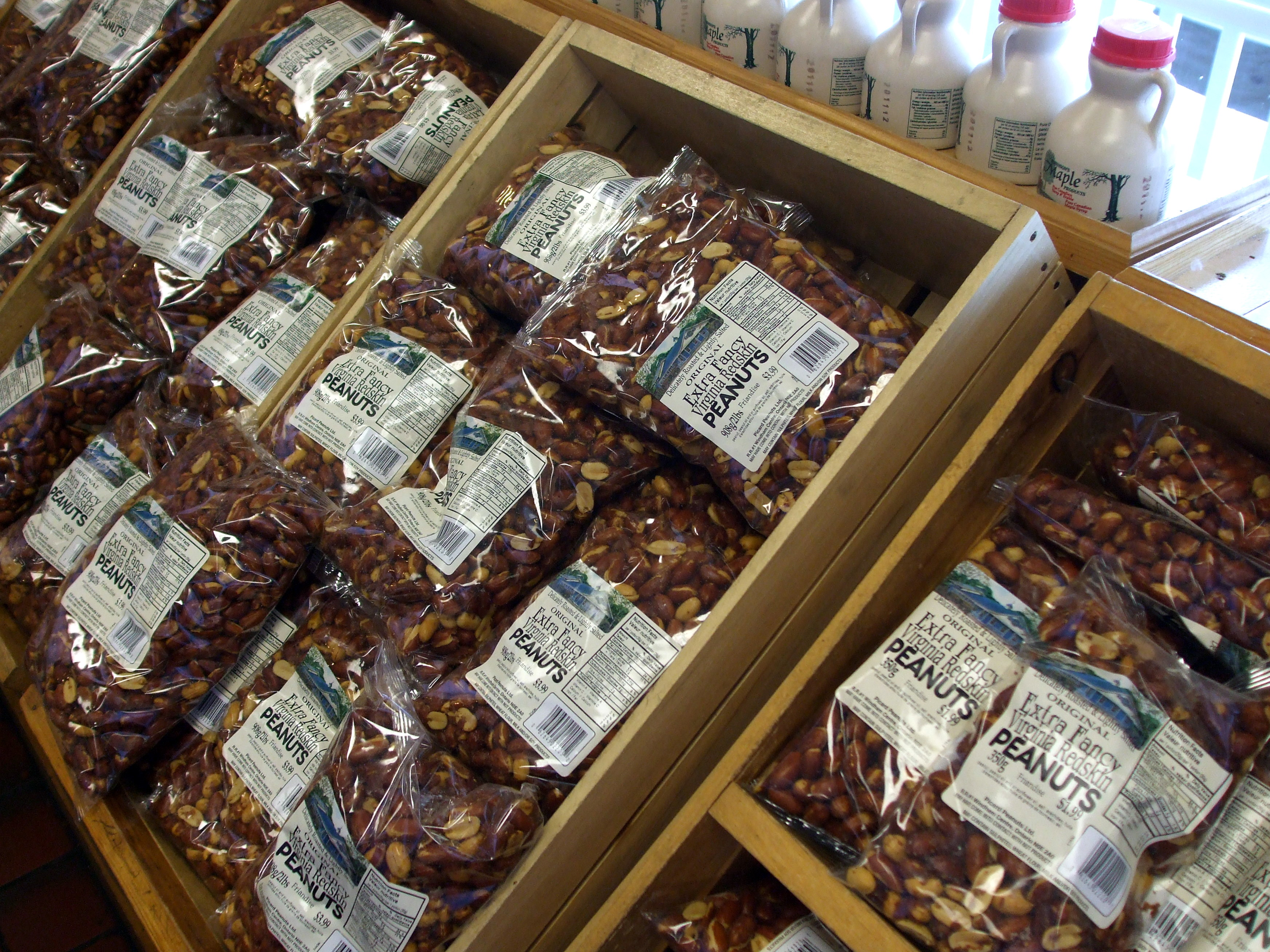
Picard's Peanuts products being sold in St. Jacobs, Ontario

Jim Picard Sr. was a farmer from Simcoe who cultivated tobacco and corn before experimenting with peanuts as an alternative to tobacco on the Norfolk Sand Plain of Norfolk County, Ontario. Picard sought out support from the University of Guelph's Delhi Research Station for peanut production experiments in Norfolk County. The Delhi Research Station in Delhi, Ontario had already been experimenting with peanut production in since 1973.

Following these experiments, Picard and his collaborative researchers determined that large-scale production was not viable in Ontario owing to its short growing seasons. However, Picard was able to produce enough peanuts in Ontario for small retail operations, which eventually evolved into establishing Picard's Peanuts in 1979. Contrary to what advertising would suggest, Picard's Peanuts does use imported peanuts in its products to supplement its stock of Ontario-grown peanuts. Valencia peanuts are currently the only type of peanuts that are being commercially produced in Canada and all other types of peanuts sold by Picard's Peanuts are imported.

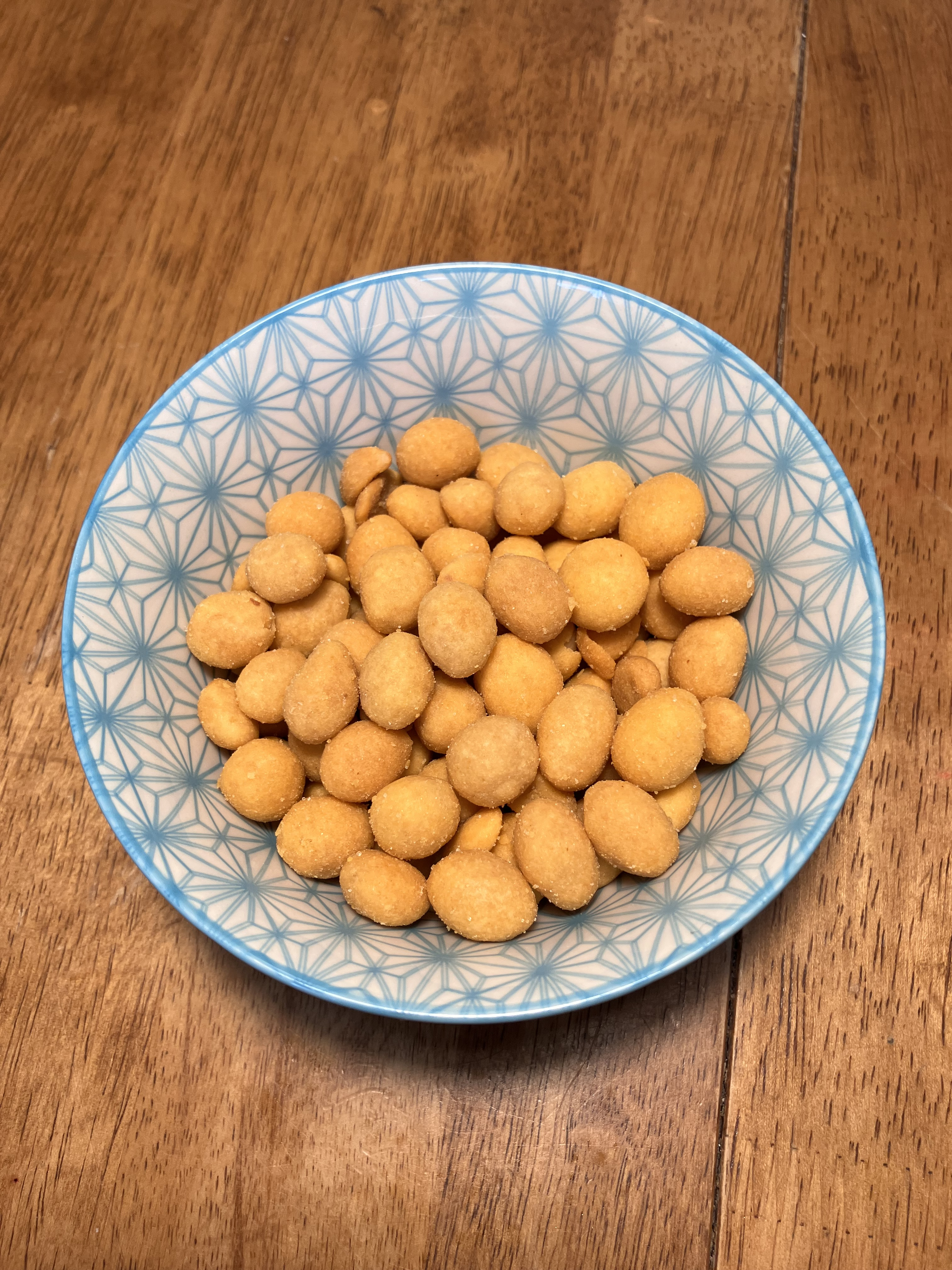
Chip Nuts from Picard's Peanuts

In 2012, the company was split into two separate companies following a failed succession plan within the Picard family, thereby creating to similar snack food chains, Picard's Peanuts Ltd. owned by the company's founder and his son, Jim Picard Jr. and Picard Foods owned by Picard's son, John, and daughter, Renee. Picard Foods, doing business as Picard's has locations in St. Jacobs, Talbotville, Waterdown, and Niagara-on-the-Lake. The similarity in names and products has led to confusion among customers.

In 2016, a fire broke out at the Norfolk county processing facility, but was swiftly put out by truck driver who happened to notice the fire first.

== Operations ==
As of 2006, Picard's Peanuts has grown and processed 400,000 lbs of peanuts each year and imports another million pounds from southern U.S. growers. Processing of the peanuts occurs at the plant in a plant in Waterford, Ont.

== Products ==
Picard's Peanuts produce a variety of different types of peanuts including Cocktail Peanuts, Virginia Redskins, Spanish, and Valencia peanuts. They also produce Chip Nuts, introduced in the early 1990s, which are a deep-fried peanuts covered in potato batter meant to merge potato chips and peanuts. Chip Nuts are closely related to Japanese-style peanuts. Similar to the Chip Nut, they also produce "potato chip covered" sunflower seeds.

Picard's Peanuts also sell a variety of confectioneries including fudge, chocolate, and candy.

== Locations ==
- Windham Centre, Ontario
- Arva, Ontario
- Morriston, Ontario
- Fonthill, Ontario
- Fort Erie, Ontario
- Woodstock, Ontario
