= Nagaraya =

Philippine snack food brand

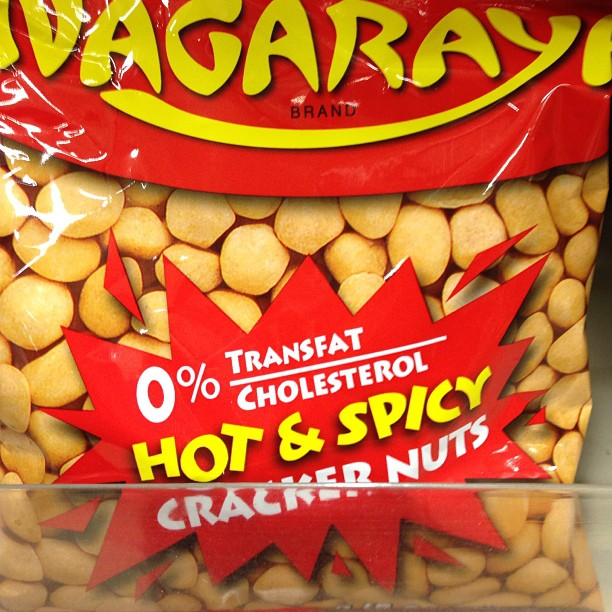
- Nagaraya cracker nuts in package.
- Product type: Snack food
- Current owner: Food Industries, Inc.
- Country: Philippines
- Introduced: 1968
- Markets: Philippines
- Tagline: "Go nuts with the crunch"
- Website: www.nagaraya.com.ph

Nagaraya (Japanese: ナガラヤ) is a snack food brand owned by Food Industries, Inc., a Philippine-based company. Its core product, Nagaraya Cracker Nuts, was first introduced in the Philippines in 1968. It is composed of peanuts encased in a wheat flour-based coating. The texture is similar to that of Wasabi peas, but with a nutty flavor and comes in five different flavor varieties. The product has no preservatives, colourants, non-natural additives, zero cholesterol and low sodium content (85mg or 4 percent). It is also worthy of note that it also has a fiber content of 1g or 4 percent of daily intake and 2% of iron.

The brand is also used for the company's other snack food product, Nagaraya Sweet-Mini Pretzels, a biscuit stick snack similar to Pretz and Pocky.

== Recalls ==
In 2014, according to the Food and Drug Administration, a particular batch of Nagaraya Cracker Nut Original Butter Flavor was recalled for suspected unacceptable amounts of aflatoxin.

== See also ==
- Japanese-style peanuts
