= Ronald Beckett =

Canadian composer (born 1956)

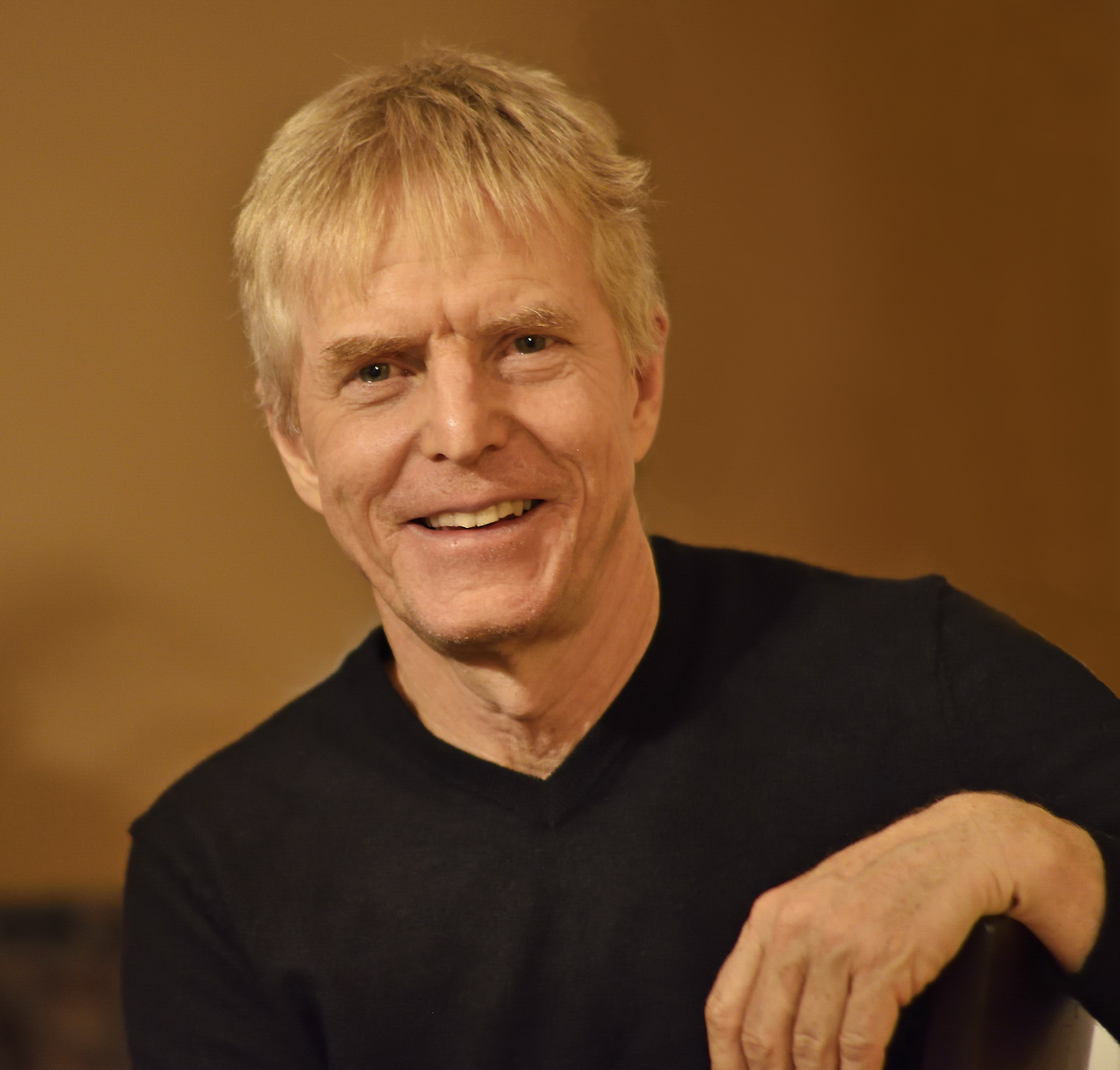
Ronald Beckett in 2018

Ronald Beckett (born 1956) is a Canadian composer, conductor, choir director, and the founder/ artistic director of the Arcady Ensemble.

== Early life and education ==
Beckett grew up in Simcoe, Ontario, and received his early piano training from Raymond Daniels who also encouraged him with his composing career which began at the age of eleven. His original compositions and arrangements formed the basis of annual Christmas Eve home concerts held for neighbours and friends. He later graduated from McMaster University with a Bachelor of Music degree in History and Theory and received a Master of Music degree in Composition from Western University. He is an associate of the Royal Conservatory of Music in Piano Performance and was inducted into the McMaster Alumni Gallery in 2004 in recognition of his contributions to music and the community.

== Career ==
Beckett's compositions are performed throughout Ontario and are frequently heard on classical radio throughout North America and Europe. He has written a trilogy of operas entitled Ruth, John and I Am... that have been fully staged by Arcady Ensemble and Queen's Student Opera. He has written additional large-scale works for orchestra, orchestra and choir, chamber music, pieces for piano and organ, and some two hundred songs for soloists and youth chorus.

In 1998, Beckett transformed his existing ensemble into the present day Arcady Ensemble – an internationally acclaimed collective of 150 singers, instrumentalists, and dancers based in Ontario, Canada dedicated to the mentorship of emerging artists and the performance of new music by Ronald Beckett as well as Arcady's emerging artist and affiliated composers.

In 2023, the Canadian Music Centre named him the inaugural winner of the Walter MacNutt Prize. "The prize recognizes a composer who is working with the genres of choral music, art song, and/or keyboard improvisation" and honours the legacy of Canadian composer Walter MacNutt.

He is a member of SOCAN, the Canadian League of Composers the Canadian Music Centre.

== Arcady Ensemble ==
Arcady Ensemble has released three CD recordings on the Crescendo label: A Baroque Messiah (1999), Welcome Yule! (2001), and Ruth (2007). Welcome Yule! is a collection of Ronald Beckett's original holiday season compositions and arrangements which are frequently heard in Arcady's annually staged concerts entitled There's a Song in the Air. Most of Arcady's performances are full scale choral-orchestral productions derived from the CDs, including another annual Arcady concert entitled Voices of Summer.

Beckett has also arranged and conducted Ruby Productions' CD entitled Peace on Earth (2000). In 2002, Phoenix Records released the CD A Beckett Miscellany – another collection of Beckett's instrumental music performed by Arcady and The Essex Winds.

Beckett is known for his contributions to historically informed concerts and most recently the directing of numerous Handel's Messiah productions performed by Arcady Ensemble each year.

== Ruth (opera) ==
Ruth is a musical drama in 12 sections running 72 minutes. It is based upon the Old Testament book of Ruth. Beckett wrote the opera in 1996 in collaboration with librettist Roger Bayley of Brantford, Ontario. Since then, Ruth has been performed more than twenty times throughout Ontario. It has also been broadcast in Romania and Israel.

The work incorporates ten soloists and three choruses – a female chorus depicting the women of Moab, a male chorus of Elders, and a youth chorus that appears in the final section and symbolizing the 44 generations from Abraham to Jesus. The work is scored for string orchestra and keyboard.

On June 23, 2017, Ruth was performed in Brantford, Ontario following a two-week intensive summer program for international emerging artists. It was made possible by a grant from Ontario Trillium Foundation. On March 8, 2018, the opera, whose story features a strong female lead and primarily female cast, was performed for International Women's Day in Cambridge, Ontario. On March 25 and 27, 2022, Ruth received its first two US performances, staged by the College of Music & Performing Arts at Troutt Theatre at Belmont University in Nashville, Tennessee. On May 28, 2022, Arcady gave the opera its first outdoor performance at Whistling Gardens in Wilsonville, Ontario.
