= Stella Asling-Riis =

Canadian writer (1869–1957)

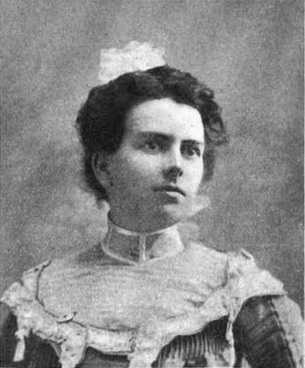
Stella Asling, from a 1904 publication.

Stella Eugenie Asling-Riis (October 4, 1869 – 1957) was a Canadian writer and a clubwoman in New York City.

== Early life ==
Stella Eugenie Asling was born at Simcoe, Ontario, the daughter of Charles Wesley Asling and Mary Isabella Morrow Asling. She attended Parkdale Collegiate Institute in Toronto.

== Career ==
An early example of short fiction by Stella Asling, "To History Unknown," appeared in The Canadian Magazine in 1893. Asling-Riis wrote a serialized epistolary tale, "The Adventures of Elisa" (1912), for The American Scandinavian Magazine. Historical novels by Stella Asling-Riis included Crowned at Elim (1903), The Great Fresh Sea (1931) and Star Over Flushing (1939). She also wrote non-fiction articles for magazines.

Asling-Riis was also a regular writer of letters to the editor of The New York Times in the 1920s, on topics as varied as King Tut's Tomb, Americanization, and the Norse in early North America.

She organized a chapter of Daughters of the British Empire, and was active in the Writers Club of Brooklyn, the Twentieth Century Club, and the Women's Christian Temperance Union. She attended national and state temperance meetings even after the end of Prohibition. Asling-Riis gave talks to women's groups about the Huron people of Canada, wearing costumes to evoke their culture; she told of being adopted into the tribe and receiving a tribal name.

== Personal life ==
Stella Asling married Andreas Jensen "Andrew" Riis (1869-1936), a Danish-born builder and widower with two young sons, in 1906. They lived in Richmond Hill, New York and were active in the American Scandinavian Foundation. Stella was also a member of the Danish American Women's Association. She was widowed when Andrew Riis died by suicide in 1936; she moved back to Ontario, where she died in 1957.
