= Grace Irwin =

Canadian writer (1907–2008)

- Born: July 14, 1907; Toronto, Canada
- Died: September 16, 2008 (aged 101); Toronto, Canada
- Education: University of Toronto
- Occupation: Novelist

Grace Irwin (1907-2008) was a Canadian writer who wrote Christian-themed fiction. She also worked as a classics teacher and minister.

== Biography ==
Born in Toronto on July 14, 1907, Grace was the youngest of five children of John Irwin, a Methodist lay minister, and Martha Fortune Irwin, a schoolteacher. Grace attended high school at the Parkdale Collegiate Institute before going on to earn a B.A. in 1929 and an M.A. in 1932 in Greek drama and philosophy from the University of Toronto. She taught at Humberside Collegiate Institute for many years, serving as head of the Latin and Greek department from 1942 to 1969. Victoria University awarded her an honorary Doctor of Sacred Letters degree in 1991. She was also awarded a Canadian Centennial Medal in 1968. After her retirement from teaching, she was ordained by the Christian Congregational Conference of Ontario, and served as a minister in a Toronto area church. She died on September 16, 2008.

== Works ==
Irwin's books reflect the early twentieth century city of Toronto, themes of Christian faith, and her own life as well as the lives of historical figures. Her first work, Compensation, is a romance written in the 1920s but only published in 2003. Three novels focus on fictional pastor Andrew Connington: Least of All Saints (1952), Andrew Connington (1954), and Contend with Horses (1969). In Little Place (1959) tells the story of an unmarried, Christian, female Latin teacher, while Three Lives in Mine (1986) is Irwin's actual memoir. Servant of Slaves (1961) fictionalizes the life of hymn writer and slaver-turned-abolitionist John Newton. Her other historical-biographical novel, The Seventh Earl (1976) describes the life of reformer and evangelical Anthony Ashley-Cooper.

Awards named in her honor include the Classical Association of Canada's Grace Irwin Award for secondary teachers in the classics, and the Word Guild's Grace Irwin Grand Prize for Christian writers.
