= Duyvis =

Dutch brand of peanut products and snacks

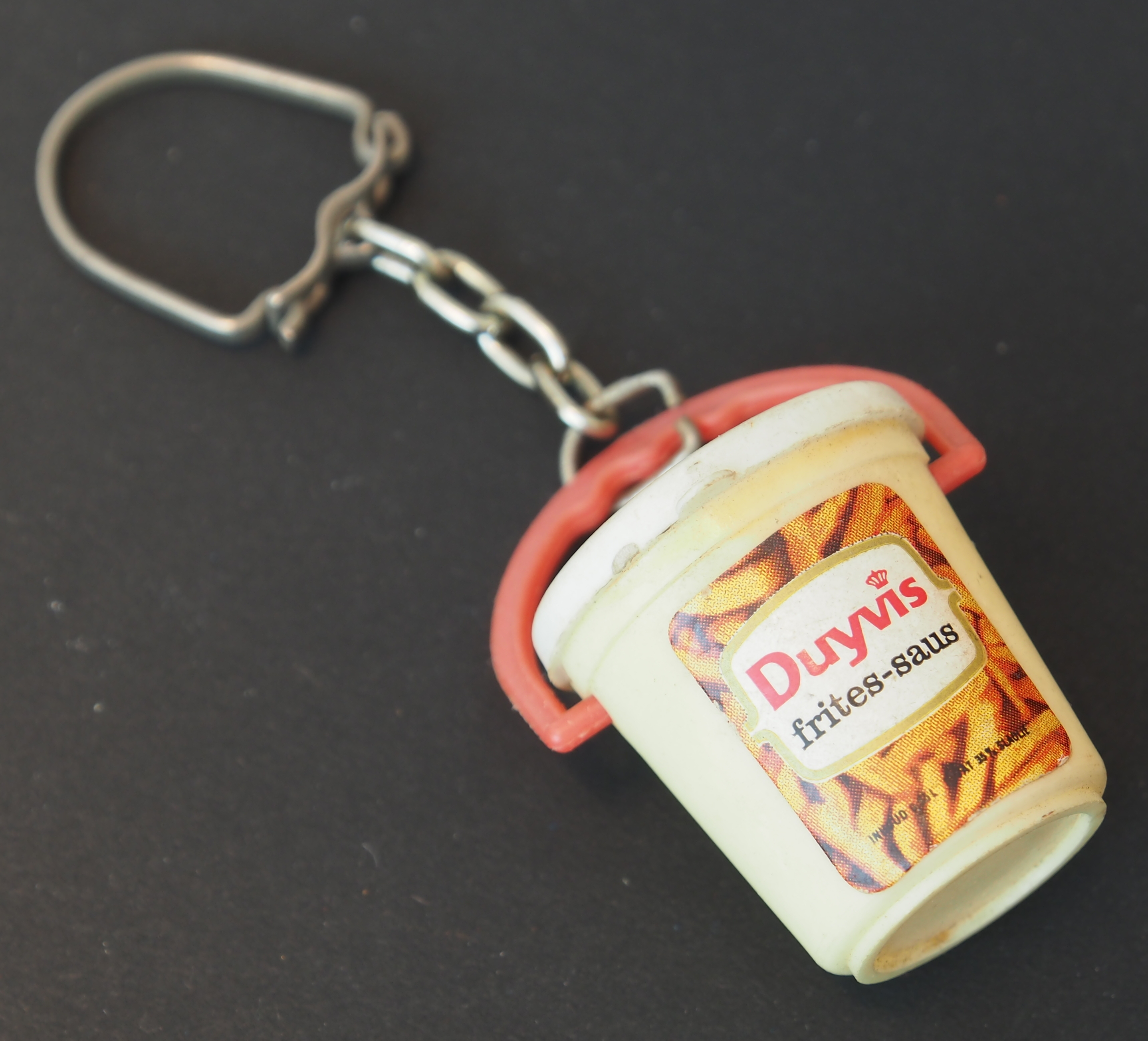
Duyvis fries sauce keychain

Duyvis is a Dutch brand of salty snacks, peanuts and nuts. Dip sauces are also sold under the Duyvis brand.

== History ==
The Duyvis name is attested since the 16th century in the Zaanstreek. In 1806, Teewis Duyvis (1757–1832), member of an anabaptist family of Oostzaandam inherited from his uncle the oil windmill De Ooijevaar near the Zaanse Schans, where it was built in 1670 and is still operational. Oil mills were used in the production of cattle-fodder with linseed oil as a by-product. The grandson of Teewis, who was also called Teewis (1825–1875), took over the company in 1850. The company expanded with several oil mills and was called Teewis Duyvis Jansz, after the grandson of the first Teewis. At one point Duyvis owns seven windmills, primarily in Koog aan de Zaan.

In 1880 Ericus Gerardus Duyvis, son of the second Teewis, built a steam oil factory and still produced mainly cattle-fodder. As of 1908 the company started exporting linseed oil and in 1920 it started to refine the oil. Between 1920 and 1930 the company became one of the largest oil exporting companies of the Netherlands. During the crisis years turnover declined and the company started producing salad oil for consumer usage. Throughout World War II oil production declined due to the inability to import the necessary raw materials. The company switched to the production of other vegetable oils products and increased its focus on the consumer market by selling branded products such as Mayolande which was sold under the Bénénuts brand.

In 1958 the company received the status of a ‘Royal’ company which it retained until 1961 when it was taken over by Akzo. In 1987 Duyvis was taken over by Douwe Egberts. In 1991, a new factory was built, still on the same location where Teewis Duyvis started in 1806 and Duyvis became the largest peanut and nut brand in the Netherlands. In 2006 Douwe Egberts (a subsidiary of Sara Lee) sold Duyvis to PepsiCo, a soft drink and snack manufacturer.

In 2006 Duyvis celebrated its 200th anniversary.

== Products ==
Duyvis peanuts exist in many varieties. Besides plain peanuts there are peanuts that are roasted, marinated, sprinkled with herbs or in combination with other seeds and salty snacks. Some of the peanuts are covered with crunchy coatings of dough in different flavours, known as borrelnootjes (cocktail nuts).
