= Alfred H. Bell =

- Born: 28 June 1895; Simcoe, Ontario, Canada
- Died: 10 April 1977 (aged 81); Urbana, Illinois

Alfred Hannam Bell (28 June 1895 – 10 April 1977) was a petroleum geologist. He graduated from the University of Toronto in 1917 and received his PhD from the University of Chicago in 1926. In 1930, he became head of the Oil and Gas Section of the Illinois State Geological Survey; a position he held until he retired in 1963.
