= Szabolcs Kókay =

Hungarian artist (born 1976)

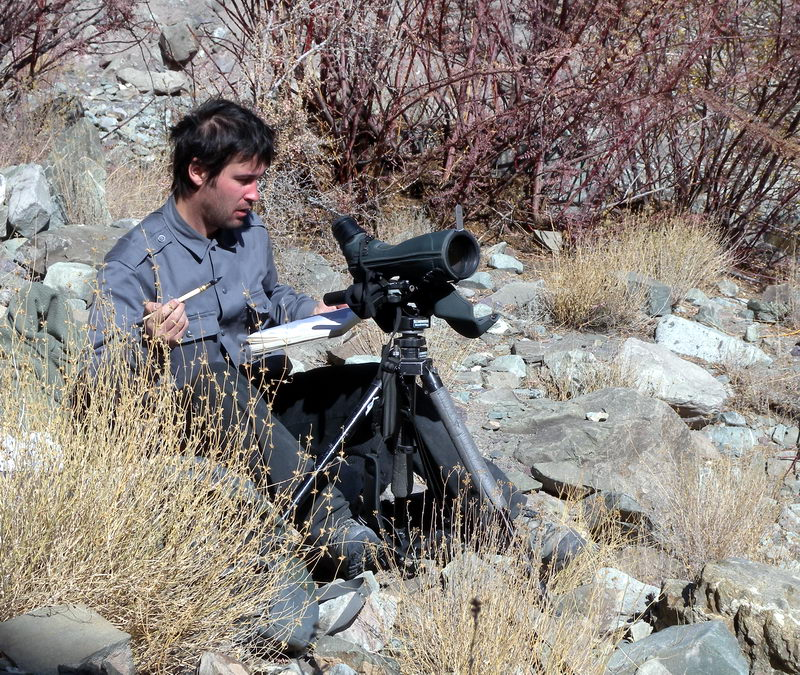
- November 2009, India, Ladakh, Hemis National Park (on a trip to study snow leopards)
- Born: February 18, 1976; Budapest, Hungary
- Education: No formal art training
- Known for: Wildlife art

Szabolcs Kókay is an illustrator, wildlife artist and nature painter.

== Life ==
He was born on February 18, 1976, in Budapest, Hungary. He has drawn all his life and became interested in nature as a small child. He began drawing animals more seriously only at the age of twenty. Between 1996 and 2001, he worked in nature conservation, first in BirdLife Hungary, then on the Washington Convention (CITES). In 2001, he became a full-time wildlife artist and illustrator. He has no formal art training. He worked with acrylics in the early years, but around 2005 he changed to watercolours, gouache and oils. He uses watercolours for looser styled paintings, for field studies and combined with gouache for illustration work. His bigger, more detailed, paintings are done in oils. He regularly works in the field to have first-hand references. He regularly takes part in international exhibitions and competition. He has been an exhibitor at the Society of Wildlife Artists' annual exhibition in London, and at the Birds in Art exhibition of the Leigh Yawkey Woodson Art Museum.

=== Main achievements ===
- 2000, British Birds "Bird Illustrator of the Year" PJC Award
- 2001, 2002: British Birds "Bird Illustrator of the Year" 3rd place
- 2008: Birdwatch Artist of the Year

=== Published works ===
- 2000- BirdLife Hungary's magazine ('Madártávlat') identification section
- 2001-2006 poster series of the protected birds of Hungary (published by the Ministry for the Environment)
- 2003 A Birders' Guide to the Behaviour of European and North American Birds (szerző: Michl Gábor)
- 2004 Woodpeckers of Europe (author: Gerard Gorman)
- 2004 The birds of the Hortobágy (editor: Ecsedi Zoltán)
- 2005 La nature sous son toit (author: Jean Francois Noblet)
- 2006 Birding in Eastern Europe (author: Gerard Gorman)
- 2006 Guide des curieux de nature en ville (author: Vincent Albouy)
- 2006 Birding in Eastern Europe (author: Gerard Gorman)
- 2008 Poisons et venins dans la nature (author: Denis Richard)
- 2009 Guide du pisteur débutant, Reconnaitre les traces et les empreintes d'animaux sauvages (author: Vincent Albouy)
- 2009 Birds of Borneo (author: Susan Myers)

=== Gallery ===
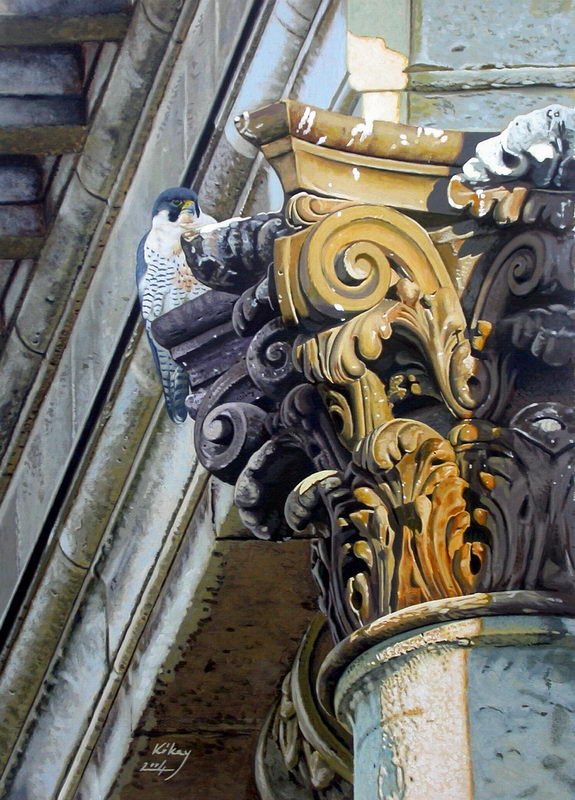
Peregrine on Saint Stephen's Cathedral in Budapest (acrylic on paper)

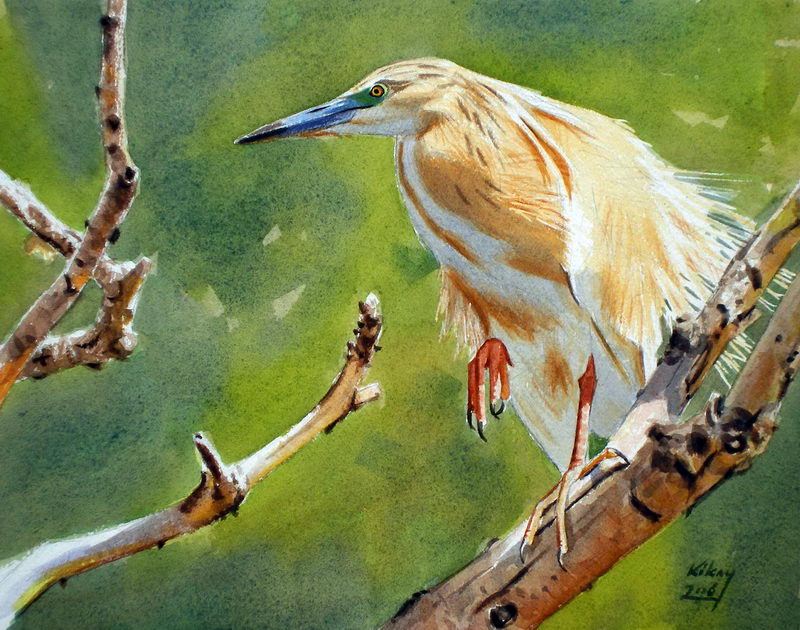
Squacco heron (watercolour on paper)

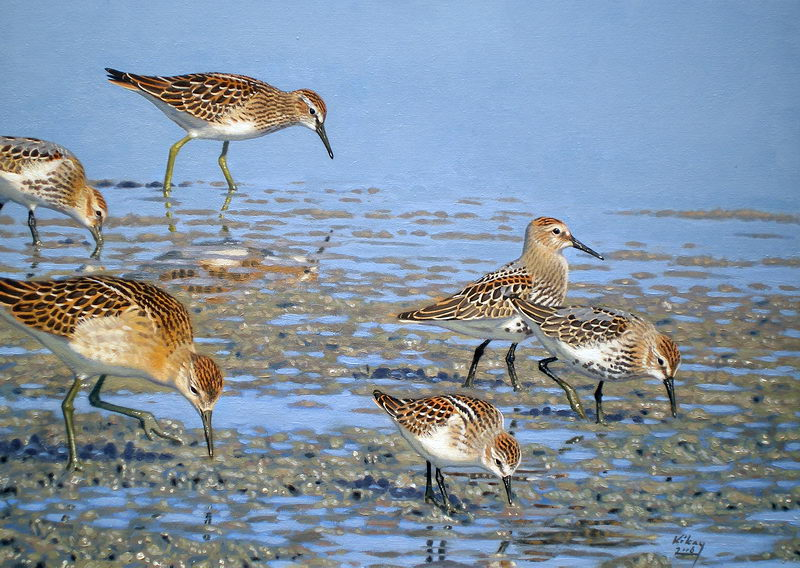
We are all young /juvenile shorebirds (oil on canvasboard) he won the Birdwatch Artist of the Year prize with this painting

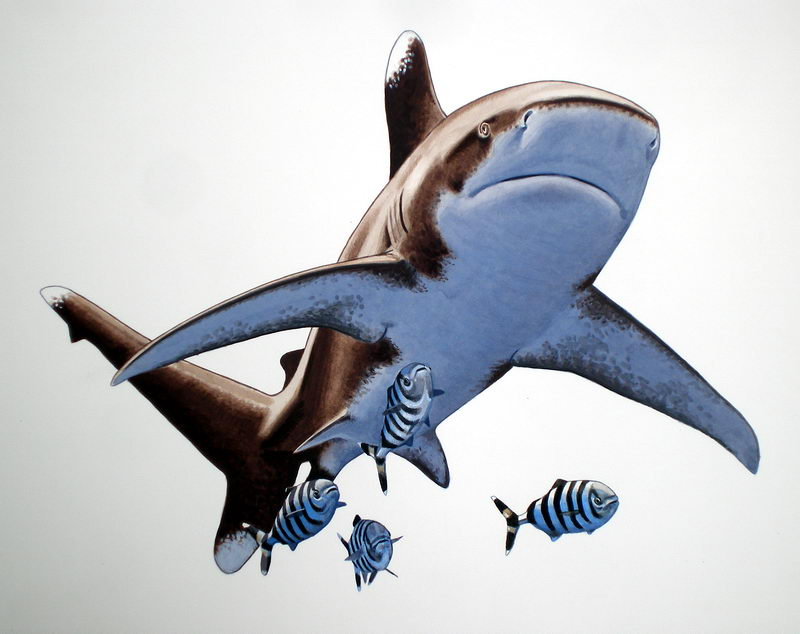
Oceanic white-tipped shark (watercolour and gouache on paper)

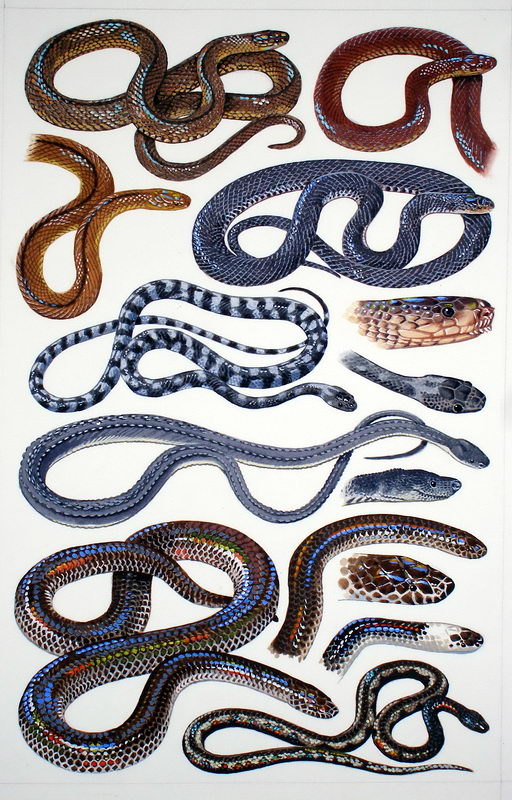
South-East Asian snakes (watercolour and gouache on paper)

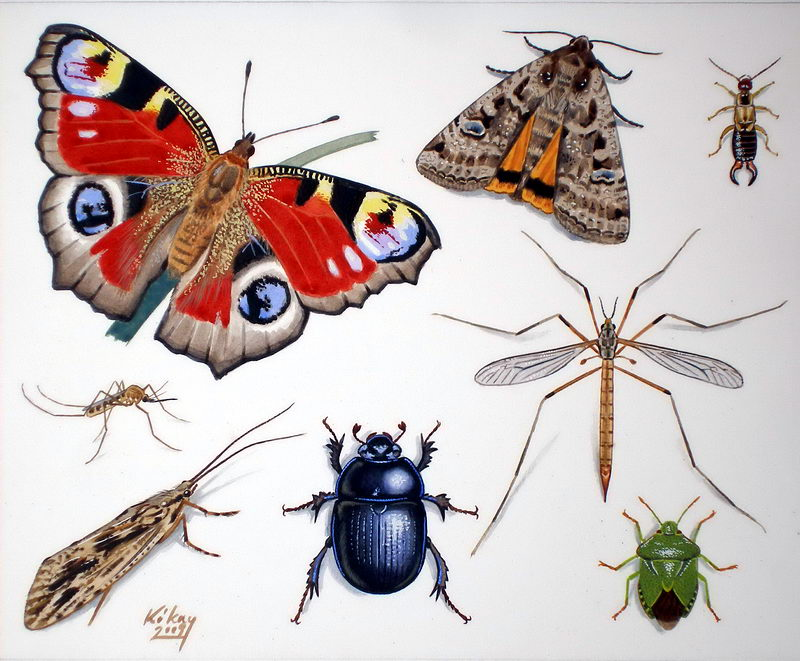
Insects of bat diet (watercolour and gouache on paper)

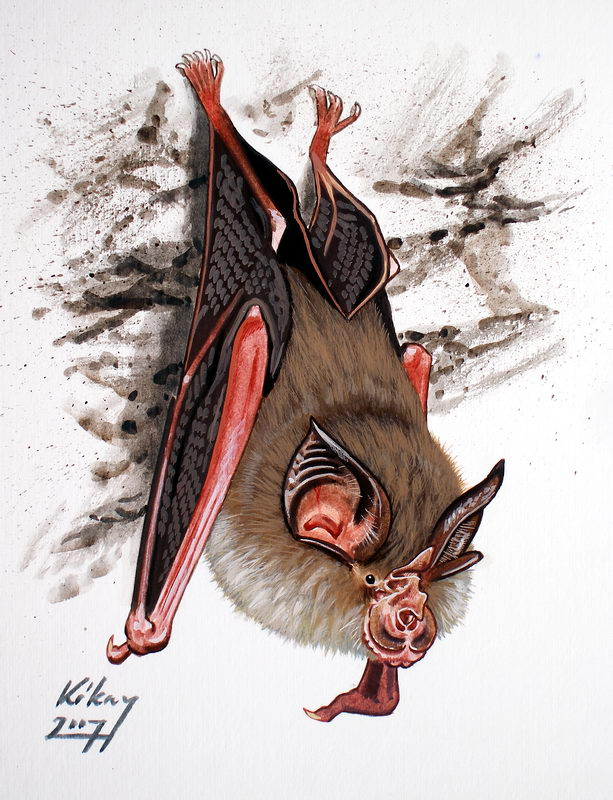
Lesser horseshoe bat (gouache on paper)

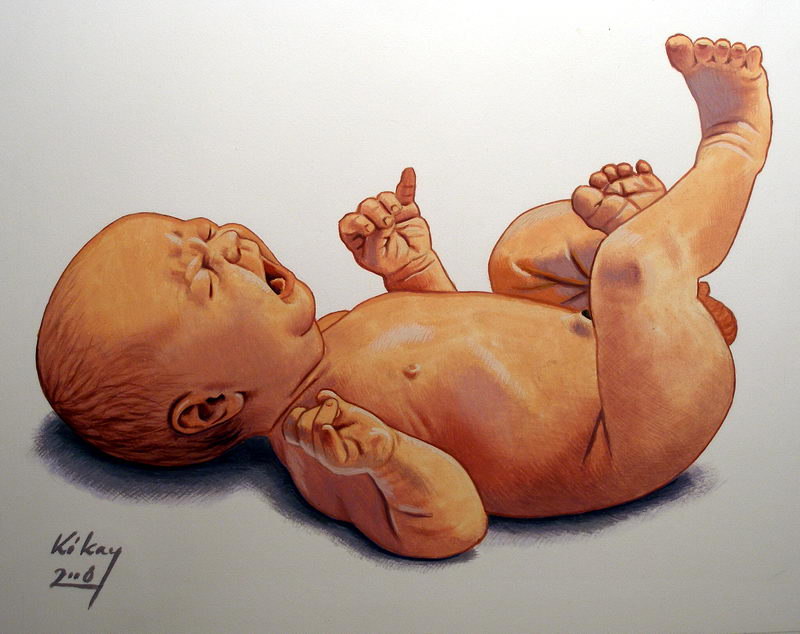
Newborn baby (watercolour and gouache on paper)
