= Arcady Ensemble =

Canadian musical group

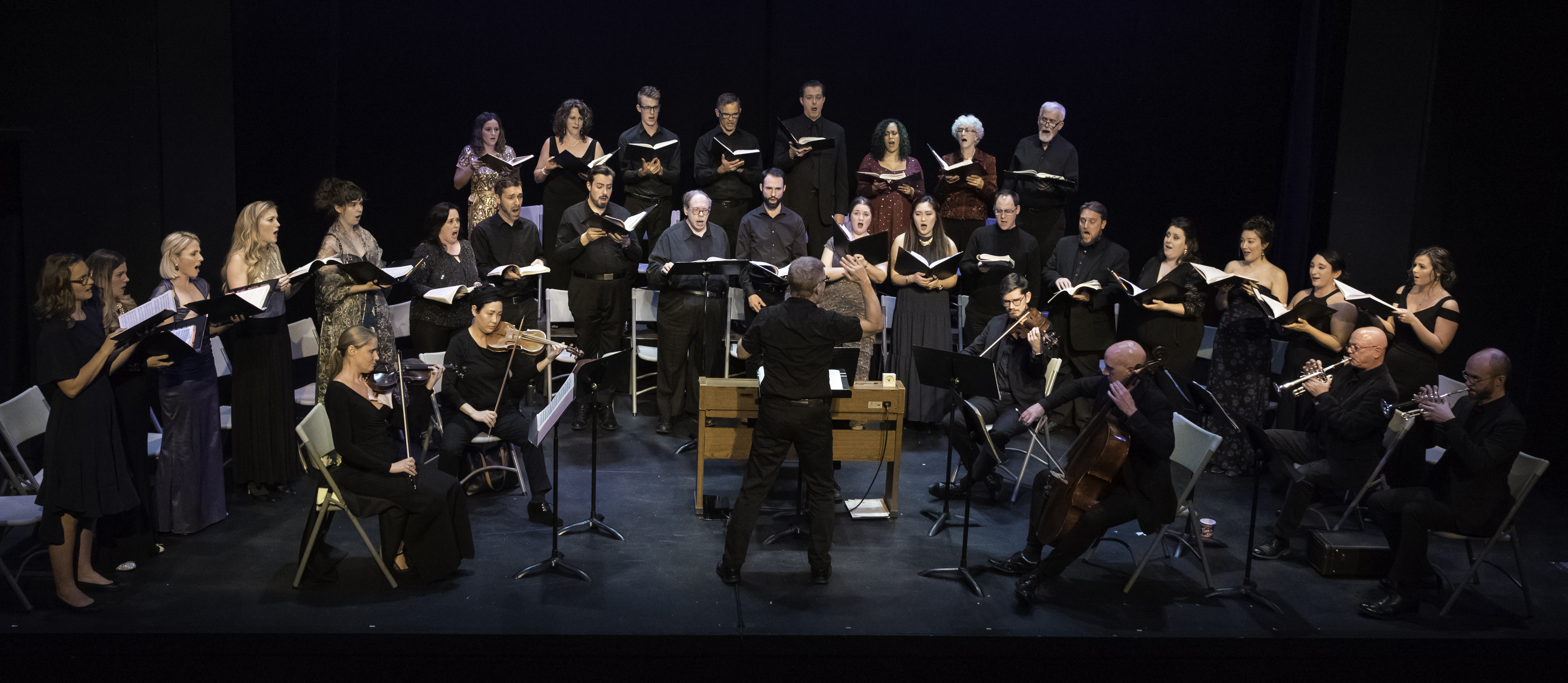
Arcady Ensemble performs Handel's Messiah at the Lighthouse Festival Theatre in Port Dover, Ontario (2019)

The Arcady Ensemble is a Canadian musical ensemble based in Brantford, Ontario founded in 1998 by composer and artistic director Ronald Beckett. The organization serves as an arts training organization that combines professional singers and instrumentalists from Southwestern Ontario with emerging artists and youth in rehearsal and performance. Its repertoire consists primarily of contemporary Canadian compositions by Ronald Beckett and emerging composers. It holds performances entitled There’s a Song in the Air and Voices of Summer in Brantford each year. The ensemble evolved from a group that performed historically informed concerts of early music. Arcady Ensemble still gives at least two early music performances annually, including Handel's Messiah at Lighthouse Festival Theatre in Port Dover, Ontario. The organization's roster includes some 150 Canadian musicians in total.

== Training Programs ==
The Emerging Artist Program provides early professional experience and mentorship for singers, instrumentalists, composers, conductors, poets, and dancers at the beginning stages of their professional careers. Five to seven emerging artists are selected each season from a list of applicants. These performers are showcased as soloists in Arcady Ensemble performances throughout the year, receive artistic and career mentorship by professional musicians, and premiere new music written especially for them by Ronald Beckett.

The Arcady Youth Singers comprises young choristers ranging in age from 8 to 18, mostly from Brantford and Brant County.

The Emerging Artist Composer Competition is an annual international competition for musicians who self identify as emerging composers. The application deadline is January 30 each year and the winners are announced the following month. Winning compositions in both International and Canadian categories are premiered by Arcady Ensemble each June.

== Director ==
Ronald Beckett is the founder, Artistic Director, and Composer-in-Residence of the Arcady Ensemble. His compositions have been performed throughout Ontario, including fully staged performances of his opera trilogy: Ruth, John, and I Am... . Ronald Beckett's compositions include works for orchestra, orchestra and chorus, chamber music, pieces for organ and piano, and some two hundred songs for soloists and youth chorus. His works are featured in Arcady Ensemble's recorded albums, music publications, and performances throughout each season.

Ronald Beckett is a graduate of McMaster University in History and Theory, holds a Master of Music in Composition from the University of Western Ontario, and is an Associate of the Royal Conservatory of Music in Piano Performance. He is a member of SOCAN, the Canadian Music Centre, and the Canadian League of Composers.

== Recordings ==
Arcady Ensemble has recorded five albums including three under the Crescendo label: A Baroque Messiah (1999), Welcome Yule! (2001), and the opera Ruth (2007); one album under Phoenix Records: A Beckett Miscellany (2002); and a holiday album for Ruby Productions: Peace on Earth (2000).

== Music Publications ==
Arcady Ensemble has produced twelve music publications of music by Ronald Beckett: Volume 1: Songs and Arias (2008), Volume 2: Works for Organ (2008), Volume 3: Symphony No. 2 (2016), Volume 4: Songs and Song Cycles for High Voice (2020), Volume 5: These are Thy Glorious Works (2018), Volume 6: Woodwind Quintet (1986), Volume 7: An Offering of Songs (2011), Volume 8: Music for Strings and Voice, Volume 9: Christmas Music for Strings and Voice, Volume 10: Music for Strings and Voice Part II, Volume 11: Songs for all voices, Volume 12: Ruth.
