= Koh-Kae =

Thai brand of nut snacks

Koh-Kae is a Thai brand of nut snacks manufactured by Mae-Ruay Snack Food Factory Co. Ltd. starting in 1976. Their original product was coconut cream coated peanuts, but other flavors such as tom-yum and chicken flavor were created later. By 2000, Mae-Ruay Snack Food Factory Co. Ltd. was awarded ISO 9001 certification by BVQI Institute, followed by the GMP and HACCP system certification by BVQI in 2002. In 2019, Koh-Kae held 50% of Thailand nut snacks market share.

== History ==
Maeruay Snack Food Factory was founded in 1964 by Chookiat Ruayjaroensap and Jiraporn Ruayjaroensap as a manufacturer of roasted nut and shrimp crackers. The company was located at Ekachai Road, Bang Khun Thian.

In 1976, the company established "Koh-Kae", the coated peanut coconut flavor, and it became a popular snack. In 1977, the company expanded to support the customer demand. Now, the company is located at Rama 2 Road, with 12 Acres of area.

Mhookiat Ruayjaroensap created the name "Koh-Kae", meaning "a wild, cool man", to match the mascot character he had envisioned for the brand. He did this to be different from the other snacks at that time, which would normally name themselves after flavors or desserts. He had the idea for the character after seeing a postcard from Japan featuring a wild haired man, and the clothing that the mascot wears in the logo is a judo uniform, in reference to this Japanese origin.

Koh-Kae remains the best-selling product line of the company, with more than 80% of their total sales being from Koh-Kae, and 30% being from the original coconut coated nuts specifically.

The original CEO's son started to manage the company in 2000, and met an important turning point in the business by increasing sales from 600 million to 2,600 million baht.

== Ingredients ==
It uses a frying process to dry out the peanut and ingredients and make it crispy. The peanut needs to be the same size, regularly glazed, light-brown color, not burn, and have a scent of coconut.

=== Ingredients ===
Peanuts 50%, Wheat Flour 27%, Sugar 10%, Vegetable Oil 5%, iodized Salt 5%, Coconut Cream 3%, Raising Agent (INS 503), Sweetener (Acesulfame-K), Antioxidant (INS 319), Packaging Gas (INS 941)

== Nutrition ==
Nutrition facts, Calories, Energy in Koh-Kae peanut in 20gram has Energy of 180 kilocalories, Protein 8 grams, Carbohydrate 7 grams, Fat 13 grams, Sodium 180 milligrams.

== Products & Flavors ==
There are many Koh-Kae flavors available. There are also many products other than coated peanuts such as roasted peanuts, green peas, broad beans, and mung beans.

=== Coated Peanuts products as at 2023 came in 12 Flavors ===
- Coconut cream
- Chicken
- Coffee
- Shrimp
- Nori-Wasabi
- Tom Yum
- Barbeque
- Ovaltine
- Sweet Chili sauce
- Mala BBQ
- Mala Spicy hot pot
- Durian

=== Peanuts products as at 2023 came in 8 varieties ===
- Salted peanuts
- Roasted peanuts
- Honey peanuts
- Chili & Salt peanuts
- Thai Spicy peanuts
- Salted Red skin peanuts
- Salted Groundnuts
- Peanut Crackers

=== Koh Kae Max as at 2023 came in 4 flavors ===
- Koh-Kae max Squid
- Koh-Kae max Cheese
- Koh-Kae max Wasabi & Japanese sauce
- Koh-Kae max Texas Bar-B-Q

=== Koh Kae green peas come in 5 Flavors ===
- Salted
- Sriracha sauce
- Shrimp
- Wasabi
- Sprinkle salt

=== Koh Kae Broad Beans come in 7 flavors ===
- Seafood Curry
- Shrimp flavor
- Chili
- Salted
- Seaweed
- Crab Roe
- Spicy Chicken Wings

=== Koh Bean (Mung Beans) come in 5 Flavors ===
- Koh-Kae Mixed nuts with salt
- Salted
- Wasabi Crab stick
- Seaweed
- Barbeque

=== Koh Kae plus as at 2023 have 7 products ===
Spurce:

- Salted mixed nuts
- Coconut cream flavor coated cashew nuts
- Honey & Sesame Cashews
- Salted almonds
- Salted cashews
- Thai spicy mixed nuts
- Thai tom yum cashew nuts

=== Koh Kae plus protein snacks as at 2023 have 4 products ===
- Roasted cashews
- Roasted pistachios
- Mixed nuts
- Roasted almonds

=== Nut Natur as at 2023 has 4 products ===
- Sea-salt almonds
- Roasted almonds
- Roasted pistachios
- Roasted cashew nuts

=== Zico stick biscuit come in 3 flavors ===
- Mixed flavor
- Seaweed
- Cochujang

=== Nelie Crackers has 4 flavors ===
- Classic
- Seaweed & Japanese sauce
- Sour cream & Onion
- Cheese

=== There is one chocolate product ===
- Koh-Kae Choco ball (chocolate coated peanuts)

=== Other Snacks include ===
- Wanz
- Fonto milk flavor corn snacks
- Tama fruit flavor jelly drinks which come in 4 flavors Orange, Strawberry, Grape and Lychee
- MR corn snacks
- Seleco seaweed snacks

=== Other type of product which are merchandise included ===
- T-shirt
- Figure
- Bag
- Other merchandise included Clocks, Water bottle, Koh-Glassy Umbrella and Koh-Kae multi-purpose box.

== Marketing ==
Koh-Kae is the leader of Thailand’s market of nut snack which has 4,000-5,000 million baht of growth worth. Koh-Kae has about 50% or more of the total sales of the nut snacks market, 40% of total sales come from coated nuts, 25% are naked nuts, and 35% are premium nuts such as almond, pistachio and cashew nuts.

Nut snacks market is 13% of total snacks market which has a total value of more than 35,000 million baht, potato is still the biggest part of the market at 35% followed up by extruded snacks at 30% and nut snacks at 13%, and others (such as fish snack, seaweed, popcorn).

In 2009, they made a campaign called ‘โดดงับ รับล้าน’ which help boost up their market growth and in 2019 they have Thai celebrity, เป๊ก ผลิตโชค, as their presenter for their Koh Kae green peas products branch as well as new commercial and advertisement which expected to boost up their growth again.

=== Marketing in other countries ===
At present, the company exports to over 70 countries worldwide, with 20% of the revenue coming from exports, and the remaining 80% from domestic sales.
