= 2003 Norfolk County municipal election =

Local election in Ontario, Canada

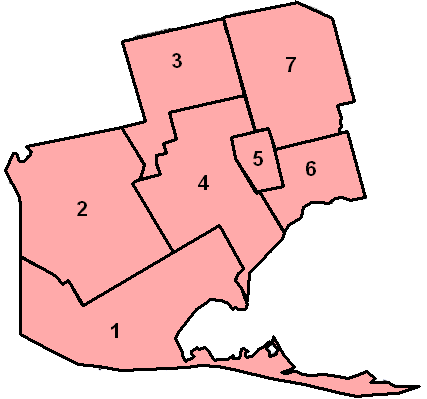
Map of the Wards in Norfolk County

The second municipal election in Norfolk County, Ontario, Canada took place in November 2003.

While it would fail to dismantle the tobacco status quo of the municipality; the election would weaken it significantly through the influence of the local anti-tobacco youth. Incumbent mayor Rita Kalmbach defeated 21-year-old political neophyte Brian Decker by 12,143 votes to 5,158, securing her seventh term. Around the time of the election, many other municipalities were voluntarily banning smoking in public places. Meanwhile, the town councillor seats remained exactly the same as in 2000. The election occurred with little notice or fanfare.

Three years later, Dennis Travale would become mayor and bring Norfolk County out of its economic stagnancy before the recent Canadian economic meltdown would bring it the local economy back into a state of malaise.

== See also ==
- 2010 Norfolk County municipal election
- 2006 Norfolk County municipal election
- 2000 Norfolk County municipal election
