= Big Creek National Wildlife Area =

Coordinates: 42.593890°N 80.44858°W

Big Creek National Wildlife Area is a National Wildlife Area located on the northern shore of Lake Erie, around three kilometres southwest of Port Rowan, Norfolk County, Ontario, in Canada. It is located west of Long Point National Wildlife Area. The area contains a variety of wildlife and is mostly composed of undisturbed wetlands and marshes. The park is 770 hectares sized and consists of two units: Big Creek and Hahn Marsh. It is recognised by the Ramsar Convention and the Ontario Ministry of Natural Resources and Forestry.

== Biodiversity ==
The area contains several threatened species as listed by the park:

- Eastern hognose snake
- Least bittern
- Eastern foxsnake
- Fowler's Toad

As well as species of special concern:

- Red-headed woodpecker
- Short-eared owl
- Eastern ribbon snake
- Eastern milk snake
- Swamp rose mallow

Anseriformes seasonally migrate to and from the area at spring and autumn, as do Monarch Butterflies in August and September.

The European common reed (Phragmites australis), a non-native, invasive species, has affected nutrient levels. Growth has been curbed by a series of pumps and dykes which simulate the natural change of water levels that also help create plant diversity in the park.

The Park is managed by the Canadian Wildlife Service under the Canadian Wildlife Act, adhering to the Wildlife Area Regulations.

== See also ==
- Long Point National Wildlife Area
- Geography of Canada
