= 2000 Norfolk County municipal election =

Local election in Ontario, Canada

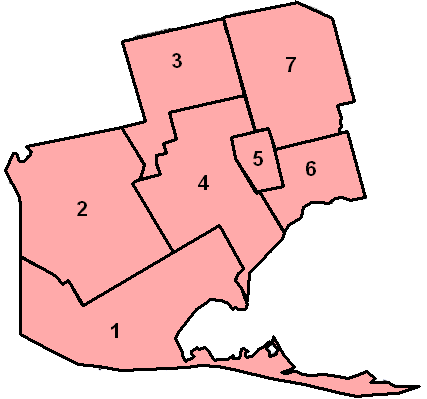
Map of the Wards in Norfolk County

The first municipal election in Norfolk County, Ontario, Canada in the year 2000 was the first one as a single-tier municipality.

Rita Kalmbach defeated the former Simcoe mayor Rick Kolwasky and another rival candidate by the name of Dennis Travale (who would eventually win the 2006 election) by ensuring the tobacco farmers a future in Norfolk County and the tobacco belt that surrounds it. This election helped to start the transition period from a stagnant agrarian region to a thriving agritourism region. However, the economic boom that Norfolk County experienced in the 2000s was shattered by the Great Recession that came into existence shortly before 2009.

== Councillors Elected in 2000 ==
(note: list is not complete)

- Ward 5 - Peter Black
- Ward 4 - Dean Morrison

== See also ==
- 2003 Norfolk County municipal election
- 2006 Norfolk County municipal election
- 2010 Norfolk County municipal election
