= Fatma =

Fatma may refer to:

- Fatima (given name), an Arabic given name, variant of Fatima
- Fatma (surname), from the given name
- Fatma (TV series), a 2021 Turkish miniseries
- Fatma (film), a 1947 film starring Umm Kulthum

== See also ==
- Fatima (disambiguation)
