= 2010 Norfolk County municipal election =

Local election in Ontario, Canada

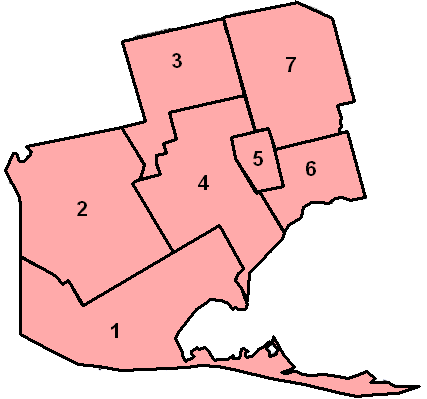
Map of the Wards in Norfolk County

The fourth municipal election in Norfolk County, Ontario, Canada took place on October 25, 2010. The incumbent (and re-elected) mayor Dennis Travale and his challenger Clarence Wheaton were the official mayoral candidates for this municipal election.

This was the second election in Norfolk County history to have electronic voting in place.

== Sources ==
- Norfolk County - 2010 Municipal Election

== See also ==
- 2006 Norfolk County municipal elections
- 2003 Norfolk County municipal elections
- 2000 Norfolk County municipal elections
