= Long Point National Wildlife Area =

Protected area in Ontario, Canada

- Réserve nationale de faune de Long Point
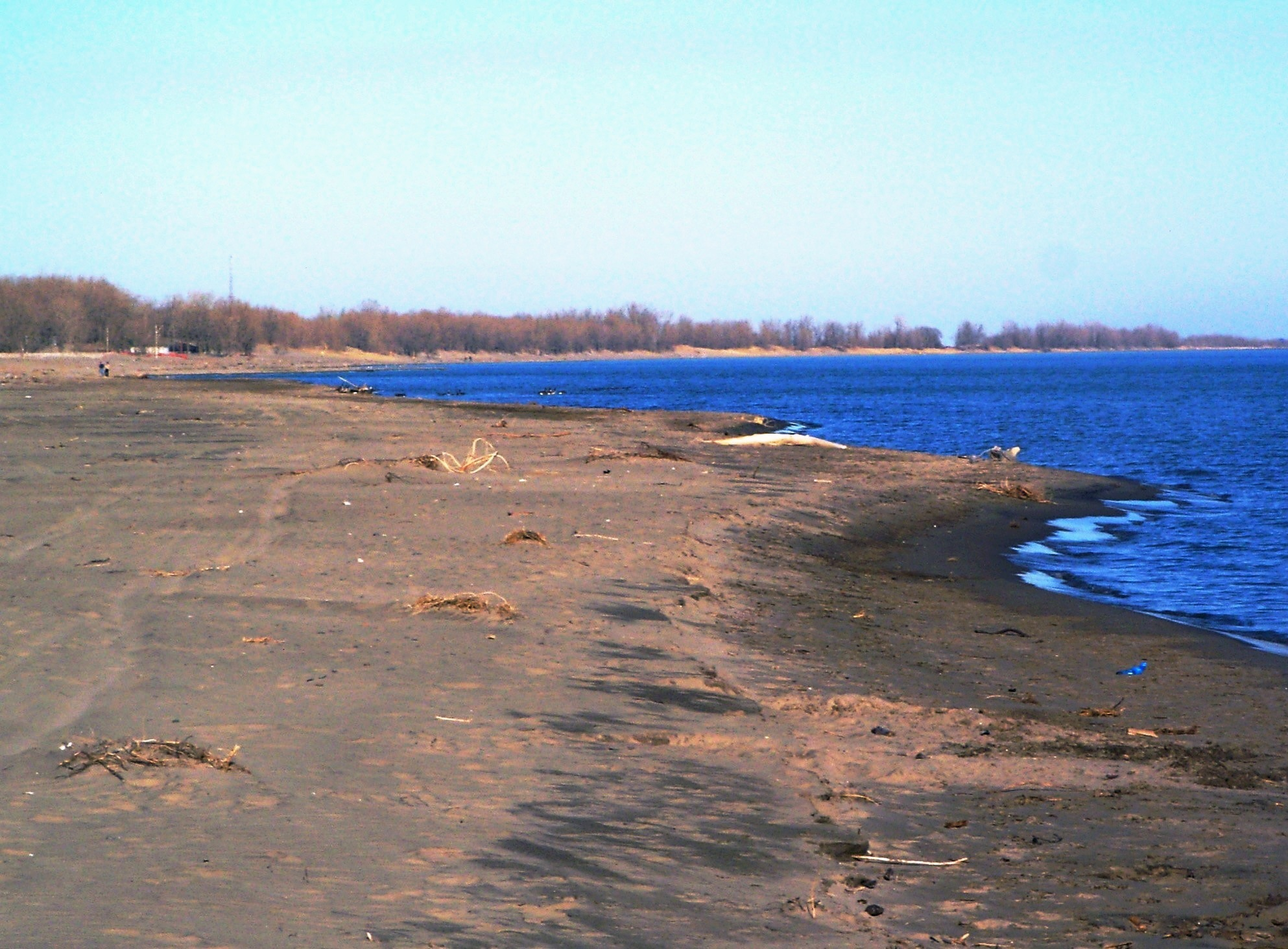
- Long Point beach.

- Location within Ontario
- Type: National Wildlife Area
- Location: Norfolk county, Ontario, province, Canada
- Coordinates: 42°34′0″N 80°15′0″W
- Area: 32.50 km^{2} (12.55 sq mi)
- Created: 1980
- Administrator: Canadian Wildlife Service
- Status: WCPA: VI WDPA: 19907
- Awards: Ramsar site, (1982, Long Point) Nature reserve, (1986, Long Point)
- Website: www.canada.ca/en/environment-climate-change/services/national-wildlife-areas/locations/long-point.html

The Long Point National Wildlife Area (French: Réserve nationale de faune de Long Point) is a Protected area of Canada and one of ten National Wildlife Areas in Ontario. It is the core area of the Long Point Biosphere Reserve, created in 1986, and has been recognized as a Ramsar site since 1982.

This protected area is located on a barrier island jutting out into Lake Erie. It comprises a complex system of dunes, wetlands, and marshes offering numerous habitats for flora and fauna. It is home to no less than 47 species of mammals, 331 birds, 34 reptiles and amphibians, and 60 fish, plus no less than 660 species of vascular plants. The area was once part of the Neutral and Mississaugas hunting grounds before being settled in the early nineteenth century. In 1866, the Long Point Company acquired most of the land on the peninsula, ensuring its ecological integrity. Since 1980, the area has been managed as a National Wildlife Area by the Canadian Wildlife Service.

== Geography ==
=== Location, topography ===
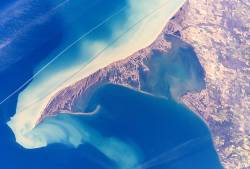
Satellite view of Long Point.

The National Wildlife Refuge is located on Long Point, a 40 km-long sandy peninsula north of Lake Erie. It lies entirely within Norfolk County, 10 km south of Port Rowan.

The reserve is divided into two territories. The first, Thoroughfare Point, is located at the base of the peninsula and covers an area of 450 ha. The second, Long Point, covers the eastern part of the Point. The western sector is adjacent to Long Point Provincial Park. In addition, Turkey Point Provincial Park is located north of Long Point Bay, and Big Creek National Wildlife Area is located to the west of the bay.

Several other Lake Erie peninsulas have similar protected areas, such as Rondeau Provincial Park and Point Pelee National Park in Ontario, along with Presque Isle State Park in Pennsylvania.

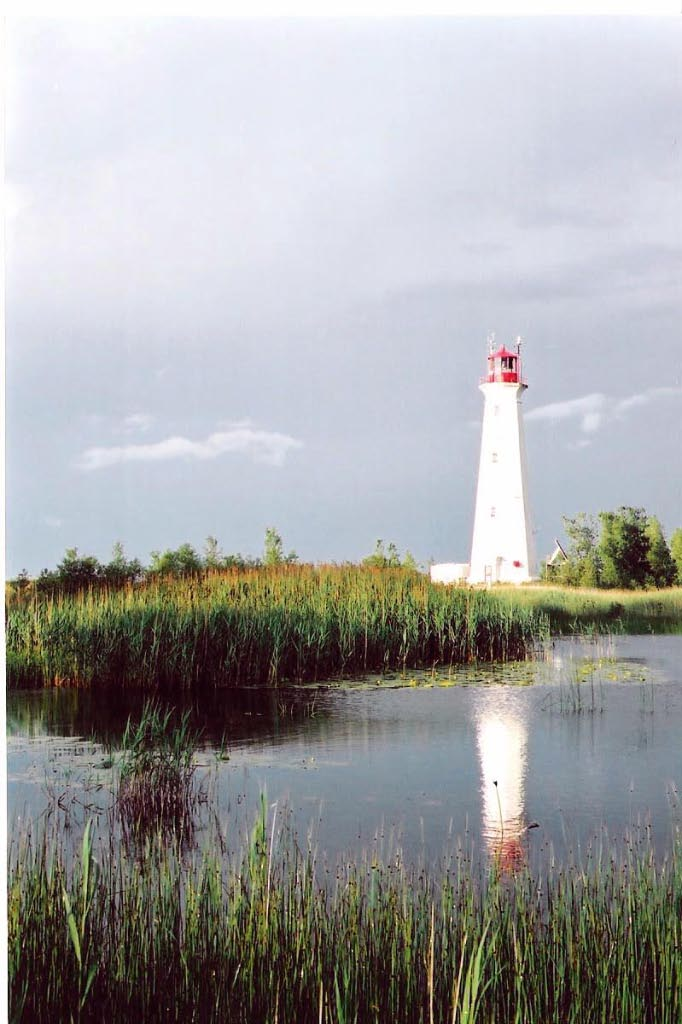
Long Point lighthouse

=== Geology ===
Long Point is a 40 km barrier island jutting out into Lake Erie. It is the largest barrier beach in the Great Lakes. The subsoil is composed of sedimentary rocks dating from the Silurian and Devonian periods (between 443 and 359 million years ago). The formation of the headland began 7,600 years ago from a moraine crossing the lake. It accelerated when the lake reached its current level 4,000 years ago. The point is fed by the erosion of sand and clay cliffs located up to 95 km to the west of the peninsula. Today, the cape is still growing, advancing almost 5 m eastwards every year.

=== Relief and hydrography ===
The topography of the reserve is fairly flat, with altitudes ranging from 174 m, corresponding to the level of Lake Erie, to 183 m. The southern part of the reserve is characterized by a 32 km-long beach. The north of the peninsula features a vast system of marshes and wetlands alternating with sand dunes.

=== Weather ===
The climate in the Long Point region is reputed to be one of the most gentle in Canada. Winters are mild and snowy, while summers are hot and humid. Precipitation is evenly distributed throughout the year, with an annual total of almost 1,000 mm. The average temperature in the three hottest months is 19.4 °C, while the average temperature in the three coldest months is -4.5 °C.

Delhi weather record (30 km to the north-west)
Month	Jan.	Feb.	Mar.	Apr.	May	Jun.	Jul.	Aug.	Sept.	Oct.	Nov.	Dec.	Year
Average minimum temperature (°C)	−9,4	−9,4	−4,3	1,2	7,1	12,3	14,8	14,2	10,2	4,5	−0,2	−5,9	2.9
Average temperature (°C)	−5,7	−5,3	0	6,6	13,2	18,4	20,9	20	15,6	9,4	3,5	−2,5	7.8
Average maximum temperature (°C)	−2,1	−1,3	4,4	11,9	19,3	24,4	27	25,7	20,9	14,2	7,2	1	12.7
Precipitation (mm)	70,1	59,2	83,1	85,3	83,6	83,2	86,1	85,8	98,1	83,2	100,1	91,3	1 009.8
... of which snow is (cm)	33,3	29,7	20,9	5,6	0,1	0	0	0	0	0,5	9	33,7	132.7
Source : Environnement Canada

== History ==
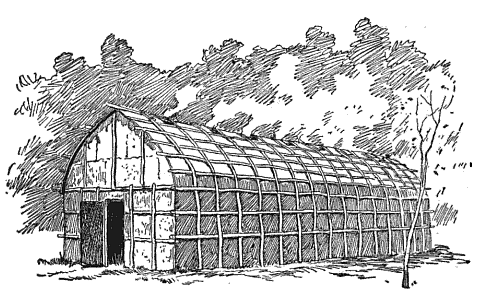
Longhouse.

The oldest evidence of human presence in southern Ontario dates back 11,000 years. Arrowheads are the only artifacts found from the Palaeoindian period. The regional vegetation changed to what it is today 8,000 years ago, beginning in the Archaic period. The Woodland period began with the appearance of ceramics around the 10th century BC. Around 900, the population gradually began to adopt the cultivation of maize, beans, and squash trio, also known as the Three Sisters. The region was inhabited by Iroquoians, who later became known as the Neutrals.

The Neutrals formed a confederation of five nations: the Attiragenregas, the Ahondihronons, the Antouaronons, the Onguiaronons, and the Kakouagogas. At its peak, the confederation's population was estimated at between 12,000 and 40,000 inhabitants living in 28 to 40 villages. These villages disappeared around 1653, victim to the Beaver Wars. The region was then occupied by the Mississaugas, a semi-nomadic Algonquian-speaking tribe.

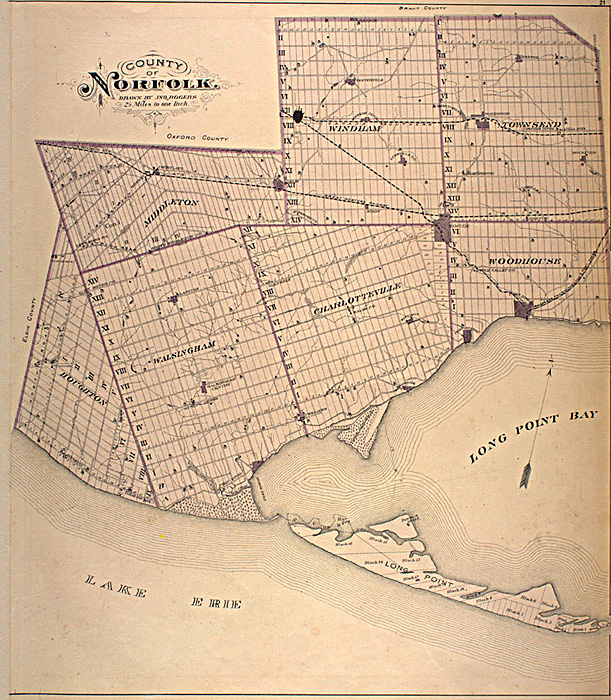
Map of Norfolk County in 1880.

The independence of the United States of America marked the beginning of colonization; the Loyalists arrived as early as the 1780s. The Mississaugas ceded the region to the British on May 22, 1784. The townships of the region were cadastrated at the end of the eighteenth century and the area became known as Long Point Settlement. At the beginning of the nineteenth century, Norfolk County was mainly devoted to agriculture and forestry.

The decline and even disappearance of quarry in the region prompted a group of hunters, organized under the Long Point Company, to purchase most of the land on the Point, i.e. 6,044 ha, from the Province of Canada to make it a hunting reserve in 1866. The only land not acquired was the Anderson family property at the tip of the Point. White-tailed deer were introduced to the peninsula in 1874. The company implemented a number of wildlife conservation techniques, issuing hunting licenses and banning waterfowl hunting in the spring.

Long Point Provincial Park was created in 1921 at the base of the peninsula. The Long Point Company transferred part of its land to the Canadian Wildlife Service, which made it a National Wildlife Area in 1980. In 1982, Long Point was recognised as a Ramsar site. Finally, it was recognized as a Biosphere Reserve in 1986.

== Natural environment ==
According to the Commission for Environmental Cooperation's ecological classification, Long Point is located in the Lake Erie Lowlands Level III ecoregion, itself located in the Eastern Temperate Forests Level I ecoregion. Canada's ecological framework replaces the latter with the Mixedwood Plains ecozone. This ecoregion has one of the mildest climates in Canada.

The reserve has been recognized internationally as a biosphere reserve, a Ramsar site, an Important Bird Area (IBA) of worldwide significance for its gregarious species, the concentration of waterfowl, and abundance of migratory land birds; it is also of national importance for the presence of threatened species and gregarious species. It has also been recognized as an international reserve for the monarch butterfly (Danaus plexippus) following a bi-national agreement with Mexico.

=== Flora ===
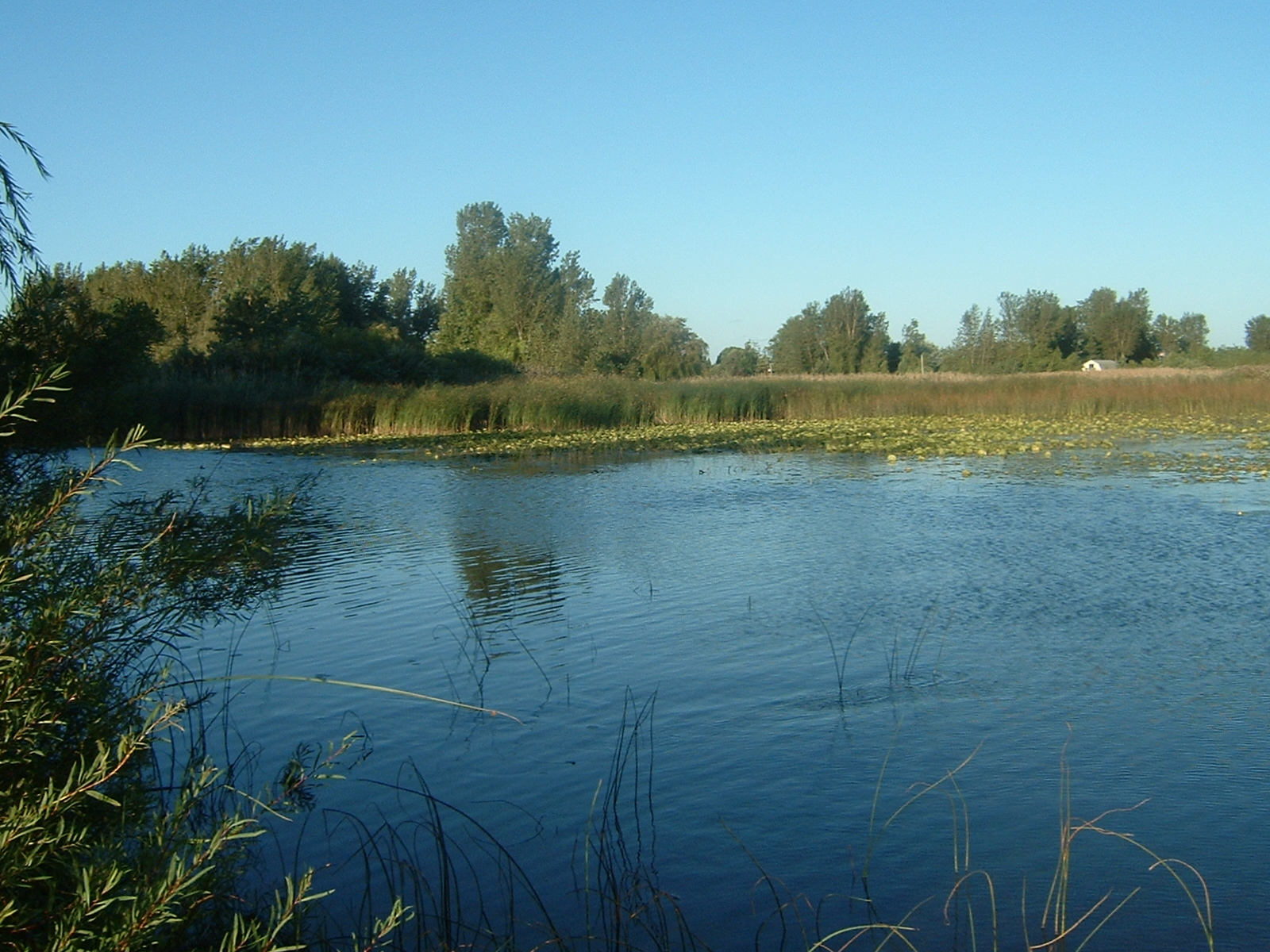
Marshes and forests of Long Point Bay.

The Long Point peninsula is characterized by the Carolinian forest or eastern deciduous forest. It is home to 660 species of vascular plants. The first plants to colonize the newly created dunes were eastern cottonwood (Populus deltoides) and Virginia juniper (Juniperus virginiana). These were replaced by swamps of tamarack (Larix laricina), eastern white cedar (Thuja occidentalis), forests of white pine (Pinus strobus), savannahs of paper birch (Betula papyrifera) and northern red oak (Quercus rubra). The shallow marshes are mainly occupied by cattails (Typha sp.).

=== Fauna ===
Lake Erie is home to no less than 60 species of fish. The most common species caught by commercial fishermen are cisco (Coregonus artedi), walleye (Sander vitreus), yellow perch (Perca flavescens), and lake whitefish (Coregonus clupeaformis).

=== Mammals ===
Long Point is home to 47 species of mammals. The only ungulate still present is the white-tailed deer (Odocoileus virginianus). Carnivores present in the region include the coyote (Canis latrans), red fox (Vulpes vulpes), gray fox (Urocyon cinereoargenteus), raccoon (Procyon lotor), Stoat (Mustela erminea), the long-tailed weasel (Mustela frenata), the American mink (Neovison vison), the American badger (Taxidea taxus), the striped skunk (Mephitis mephitis), the river otter (Lontra canadensis), and the Canadian lynx (Lynx canadensis).

Small mammals found in the reserve include the Virginia opossum (Didelphis virginiana), the Cinereus shrew (Sorex cinereus), the Smoky shrew (Sorex fumeus), the Northern short-tailed shrew (Blarina brevicauda), the North American least shrew (Cryptotis parva), the hairy-tailed mole (Parascalops breweri), the Star-nosed mole (Condylura cristata), the Eastern cottontail (Sylvilagus floridanus), the European hare (Lepus europaeus), the Eastern chipmunk (Tamias striatus), the Groundhog (Marmota monax), the grey squirrel (Sciurus carolinensis), the red squirrel (Tamiasciurus hudsonicus), the flying squirrel (Glaucomys volans), the Canadian beaver (Castor canadensis), the white-footed mouse (Peromyscus leucopus), the deer mouse (Peromyscus maniculatus), the Southern bog lemming (Synaptomys cooperi), the muskrat (Ondatra zibethicus), the Woodland vole (Microtus pinetorum), the meadow vole (Microtus pennsylvanicus), the Norway rat (Rattus norvegicus), the common mouse (Mus musculus), the Meadow jumping mouse (Zapus hudsonius) and the American porcupine (Erethizon dorsatum).

The following bats are also found here: the little brown bat (Myotis lucifugus), the Eastern small-footed myotis (Myotis leibii), the northern bat (Myotis septentrionalis), the Silver-haired bat (Lasionycteris noctivagans), the Tricolored bat (Perimyotis subflavus) and the big brown bat (Eptesicus fuscus).

The peninsula's southerly position means that a number of species that are rare in Canada can be observed, including the small shrew, the eastern pipistrelle, the American badger, the grey fox, the northern bat, the small flying squirrel, and the woodland vole. Some species, however, have disappeared from the region since the beginning of colonization: the elk (Cervus canadensis), the bobcat (Lynx rufus), the black bear (Ursus americanus), the eastern wolf (Canis lycaon), and the snowshoe hare (Lepus americanus).

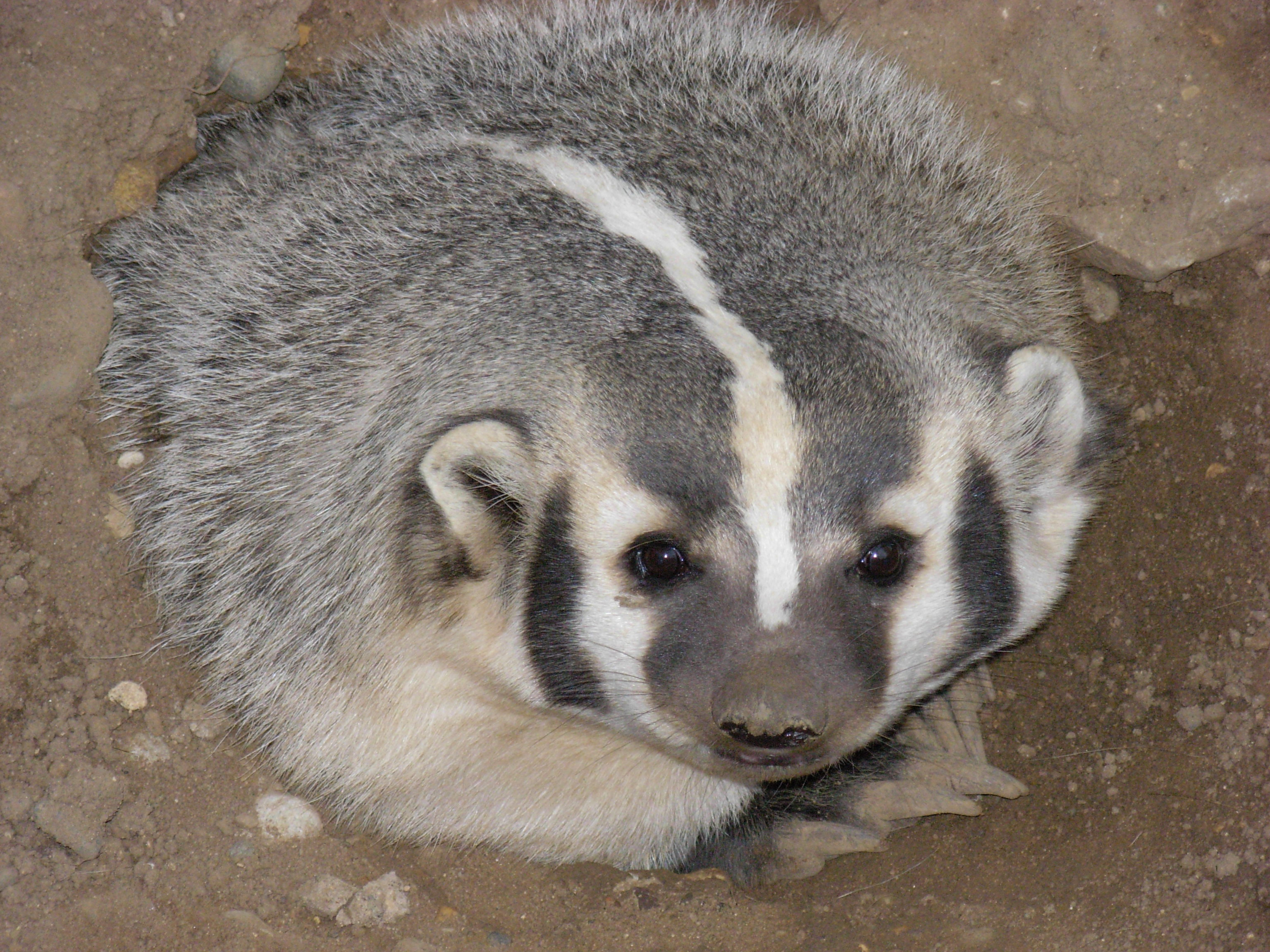
American badger

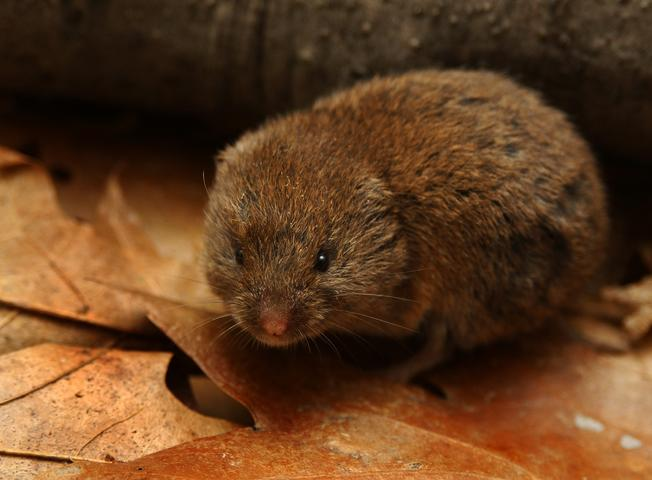
Woodland vole

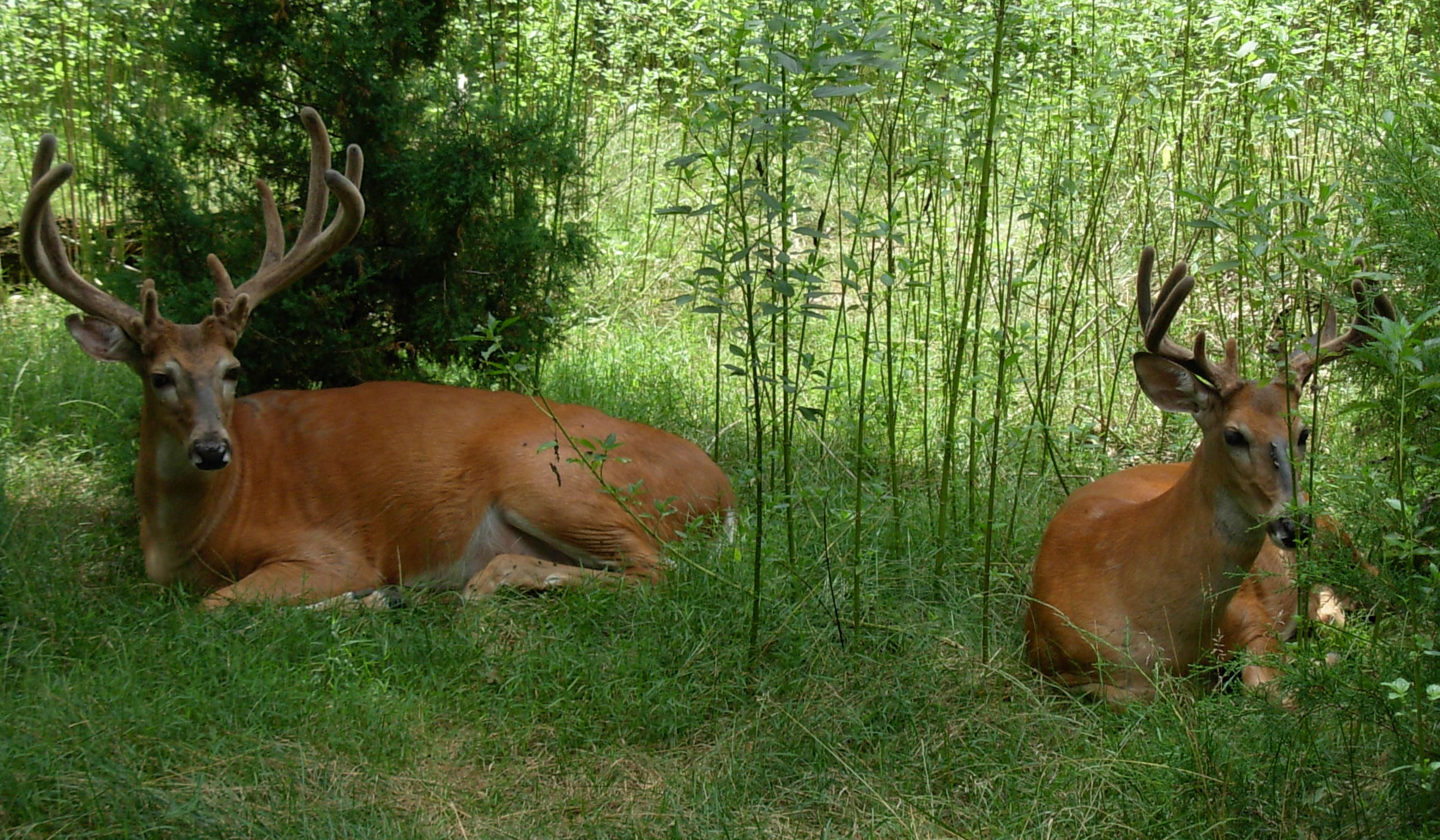
White-tailed deer

=== Herpetofauna ===
Around 34 species of amphibians and reptiles have been recorded in the Long Point region. Salamander include the Common mudpuppy (Necturus maculosus), Eastern newt (Notophthalmus viridescens), blue-spotted salamander (Ambystoma laterale), Jefferson salamander (Ambystoma jeffersonianum), spotted salamander (Ambystoma maculatum), four-toed salamander (Hemidactylium scutatum), and Red-backed salamander (Plethodon cinereus). Frogs in the region include the American toad (Anaxyrus americanus), Fowler's toad (Anaxyrus fowleri), tree frog (Hyla versicolor), spring peeper (Pseudacris crucifer), the green frog (Rana clamitans), the wood frog (Rana sylvatica), the leopard frog (Rana pipiens), the marsh frog (Rana palustris), and the American bullfrog (Rana catesbeianus). The turtles at the peninsula are the snapping turtle (Chelydra serpentina), the common musk turtle (Sternotherus odoratus), the painted turtle (Chrysemys picta), the map turtle (Graptemys geographica), the spotted turtle (Clemmys guttata), the Blanding's turtle (Emydoidea blandingii), and the spiny softshell turtle (Apalone spinifera). The snakes in the area include the garter snake (Thamnophis sirtalis), the eastern ribbonsnake (Thamnophis sauritus), the common watersnake (Nerodia sipedon), the red-bellied snake (Storeria occipitomaculata), the DeKay's brown snake (Storeria dekayi), the Smooth green snake (Liochlorophis vernalis), Eastern hognose snake (Heterodon platirhinos), Gray ratsnake (Pantherophis gloydi), eastern foxsnake (Pantherophis spiloides), Milk snake (Lampropeltis triangulum), queen snake (Regina septemvittata) and eastern massasauga rattlesnake (Sistrurus catenatus).

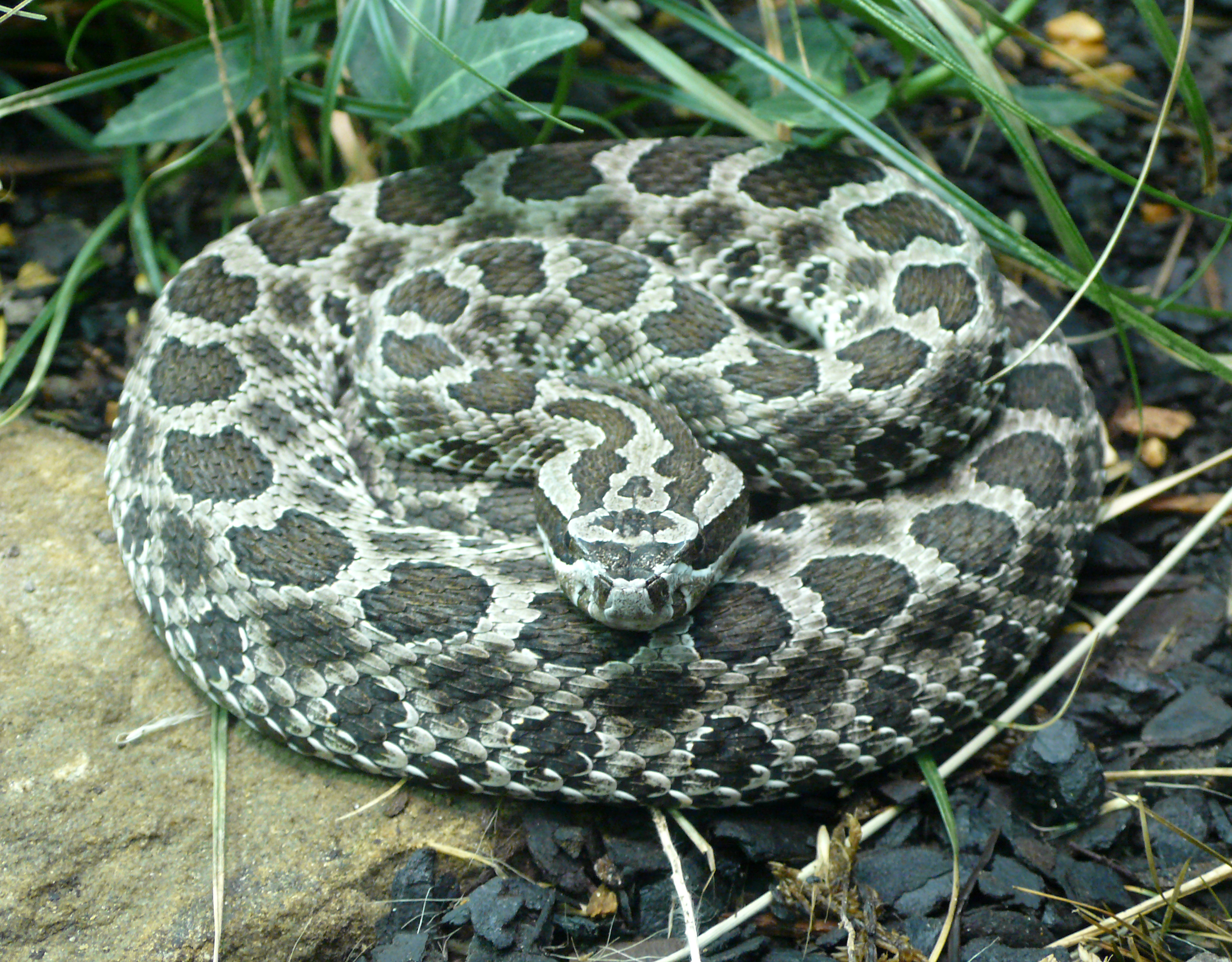
Eastern massasauga

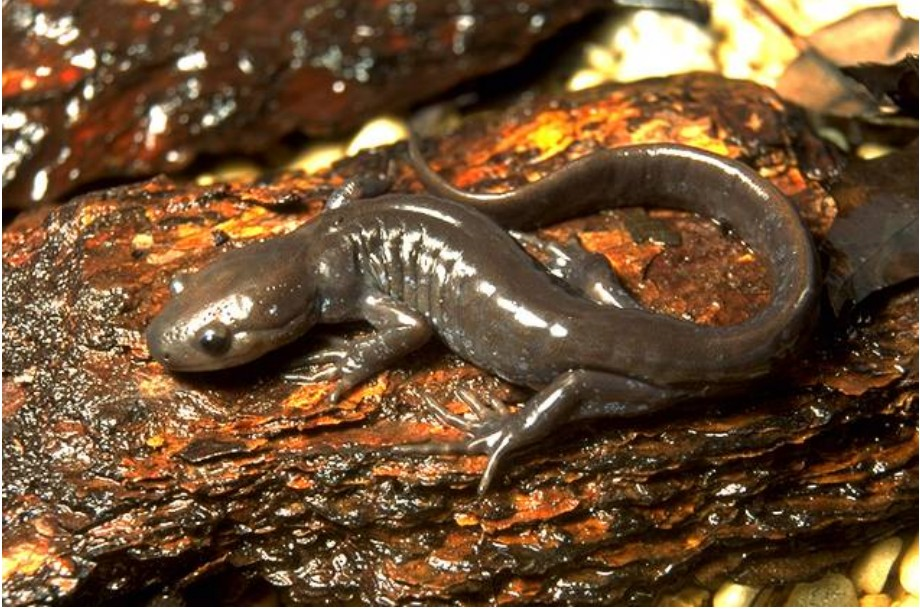
Jefferson salamander

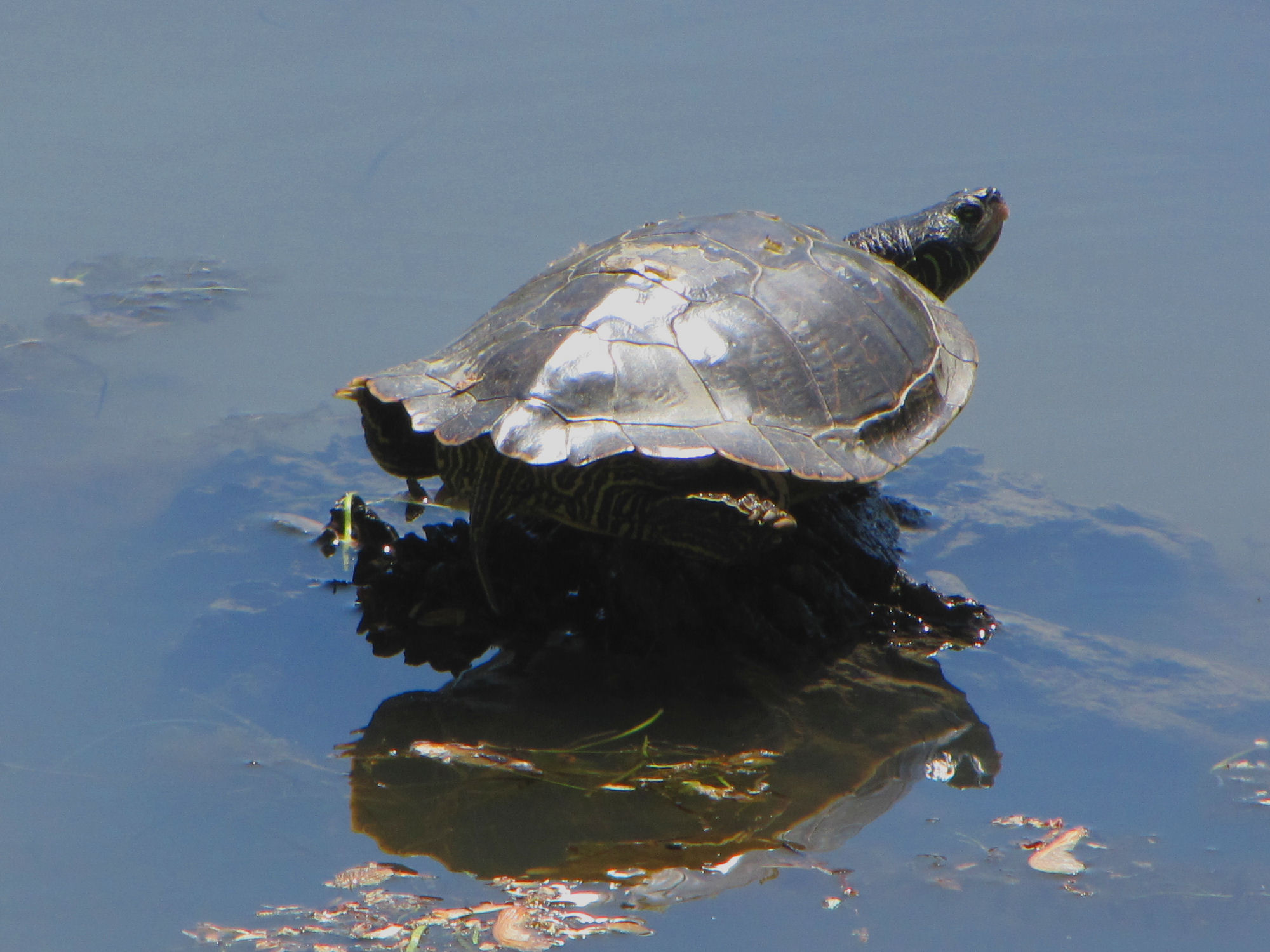
Northern map turtle

=== Birds ===
At Long Point, 331 bird species have been identified, making it one of the most diverse bird locations on the Great Lakes. Of these species, 173 are known or suspected to nest on the Point. It is an important continental site for waterfowl migration; in 1998, some 9,624,545 birds were counted during the autumn migration. Migratory species include the mallard (Anas platyrhynchos), the American wigeon (Anas americana), the American black duck (Anas rubripes), the tundra swan (Cygnus columbianus), the ring-necked duck (Aythya collaris), the Canvasback (Aythya valisineria), the redhead duck (Aythya americana), the lesser scaup (Aythya affinis), the common merganser (Mergus merganser), the red-breasted merganser (Mergus serrator). Besides the waterfowl, the reserve is also home to the following migratory species: the Eurasian whimbrel (Numenius phaeopus), the Bonaparte's gull (Chroicocephalus Philadelphia), and the common tern (Sterna hirundo). The reserve is also an important nesting site for the black-crowned night heron (Nycticorax nycticorax), the least bittern (Ixobrychus exilis), and Forster's tern (Sterna forsteri).

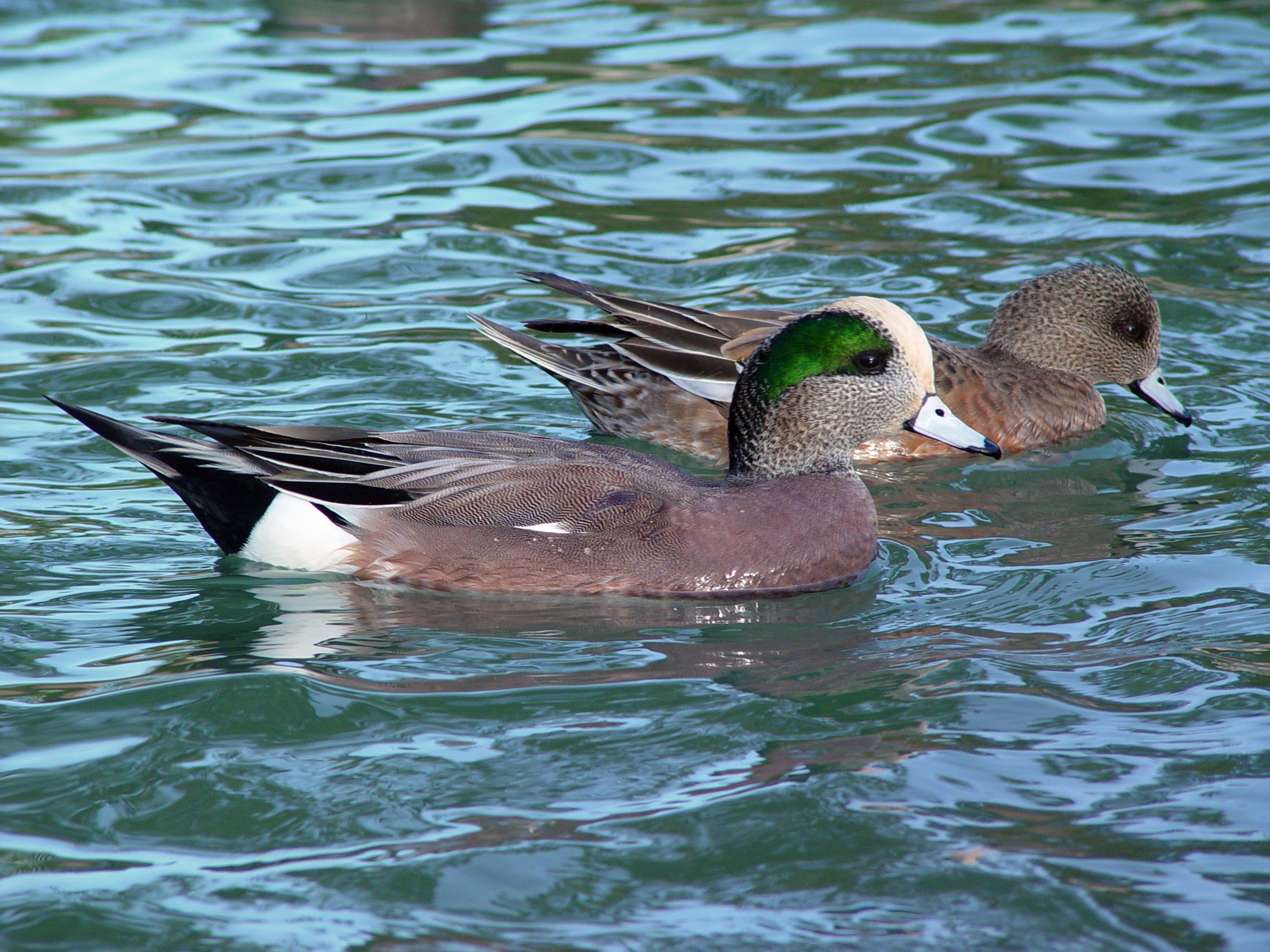
American wigeon

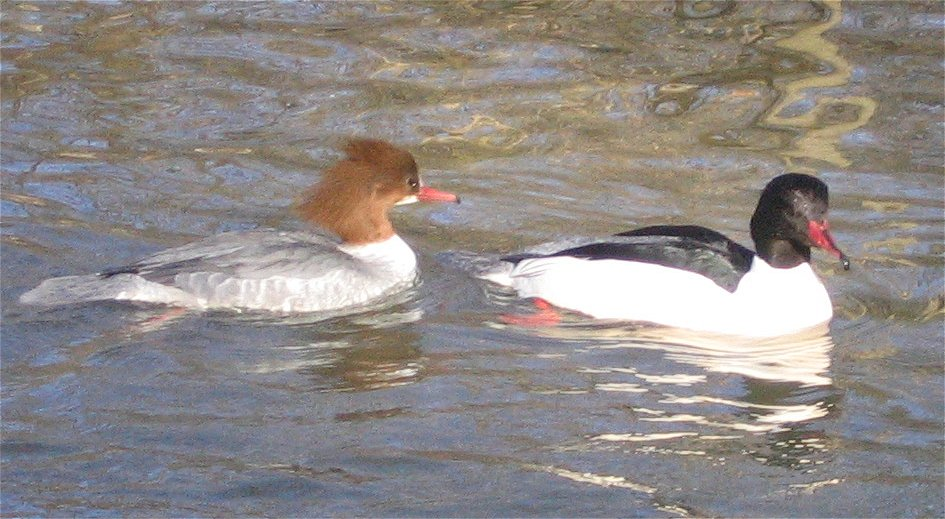
Common merganser

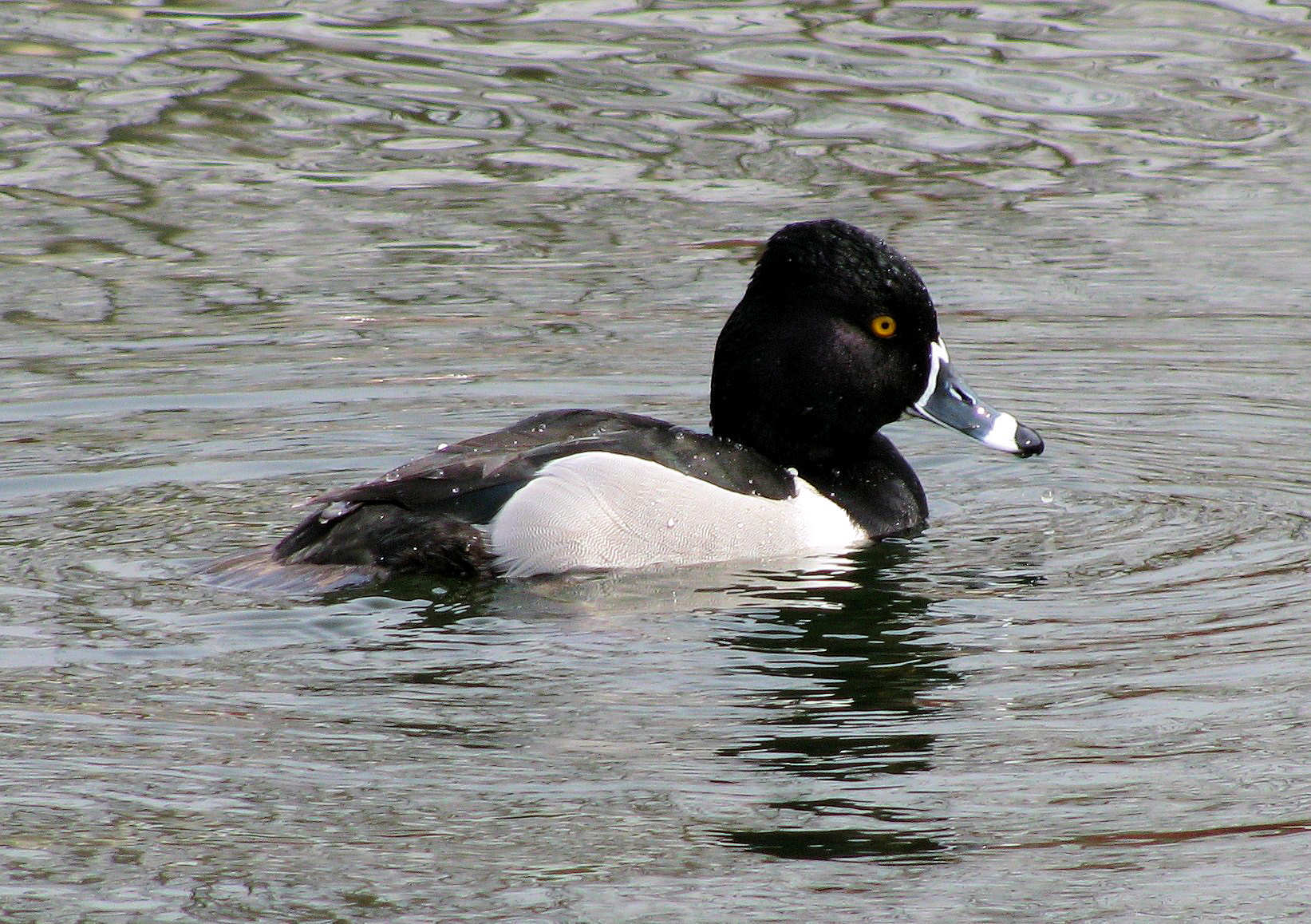
Ring-necked duck

== Administration and tourism ==
The Long Point and Big Creek National Wildlife Areas are administered jointly from Port Rowan by the Canadian Wildlife Service.

There is no infrastructure dedicated to tourism in the reserve. However, it is possible to canoe, fish (in some areas), hunt, observe wildlife and hike in the western sector. The easternmost sector is only accessible by boat.
