= Our Lady of Fátima (disambiguation) =

Our Lady of Fátima is a title of the Virgin Mary based on several reported apparitions at Fátima, Portugal.

Our Lady of Fátima may also refer to:

== Churches ==
- Our Lady of Fatima Cathedral (disambiguation)
- Our Lady of Fatima Church (disambiguation)

== Places ==
- Our Lady of Fatima Island (Fatimathuruth) in the Islands of Kollam, India

== Schools and colleges ==
- Our Lady of Fatima Catholic School in Courtland, Ontario, Canada
- Our Lady of Fatima Convent High School in Patiala, Punjab, India
- Our Lady of Fatima High School in Warren, Rhode Island, United States
- Our Lady of Fatima Minor Seminary in Dili, Timor-Leste
- Our Lady of Fatima Senior Secondary School in Aligarh, Uttar Pradesh, India
- Our Lady of Fatima University in Valenzuela City, Philippines

== See also ==
- Fatima (disambiguation)
- The Miracle of Our Lady of Fatima, 1953 film
- Nossa Senhora de Fátima, Macau, a freguesia (parish) in Macau Peninsula, Macau
