= Fatima (disambiguation) =

Fatima, who died in 632, was the daughter of Islamic prophet Muhammad and is revered by Muslims.

Fatima, Fátima or Fatimah most often also refers to:

- Our Lady of Fátima, a title of Virgin Mary based on several reported apparitions in Fátima, Portugal
- Sanctuary of Fátima, a sanctuary dedicated to the apparitions

Fatima or Fátima may also refer to:

== People ==
- Fatima (given name) and its variants, including a list of people with this name
- Fatima (surname list), list of people with this surname

== Places ==
- Fátima, Buenos Aires, a country town in Argentina
- Fátima, Bahia, a municipality in Brazil
- Fátima do Sul, a municipality in Mato Grosso do Sul, Brazil
- Bairro de Fátima, a neighborhood in Rio de Janeiro, Brazil
- Nossa Senhora de Fátima, Macau, a civil parish in Macau
- Fátima, Tocantins, a municipality in Brazil
- Fatima, a community of Les Îles-de-la-Madeleine, Quebec
- Fatima, Bohol, a barangay (neighborhood) in the Philippines
- Fatima, a barangay in San Miguel, Zamboanga del Sur, Philippines
- Fatima, Negros Oriental, a barangay (neighborhood) in the Philippines
- Fátima (Buenos Aires Premetro), a station in Argentina
- Fátima (Mexicable), an aerial lift station in Ecatepec, Mexico
- Fátima, a Medellín Metro rail and bus station
- Fatima, Dublin, Ireland
- Fátima, Portugal, a location of several reported apparitions of the Virgin Mary

== Films and television ==
- Fatima (1938 film), a film from the Dutch East Indies
- Fatima (2015 film), a French film directed by Philippe Faucon
- Fatima (2020 film), a faith-based drama film directed by Marco Pontecorvo about the apparition of Virgin Mary at Fátima, Portugal

== Music ==
- "Fatima", a song by K'naan from his 2009 album Troubadour
- "Fátima" (ファティマ), a song by Kanako Itō

== Ships ==
- Fatima (1849 vessel), an English sailing vessel
- SS Fatima, a cargo vessel built in 1942

== Other uses ==
- Fatima (cigarette), a brand of cigarettes popular in the United States during the middle of the 20th century
- C.D. Fátima, a football club in Fátima, Portugal
- Fatima College, a secondary school in Port of Spain, Trinidad and Tobago
- Anartia fatima, the banded peacock, a butterfly of Central and North America
- Fatima, pug of Queen Victoria
- Fatimas, fictional artificial life forms in The Five Star Stories
- Fatima, 1888 short story by Rudyard Kipling in Soldiers Three
- Fatima, wife of Bluebeard in some versions of the folktale
- Fatima, theme of Steins;Gate 0

== See also ==
- Fatma (disambiguation)
- Fatimid Caliphate, 909–1171
- Our Lady of Fátima (disambiguation)
