= South Norfolk Railway =

Defunct railway in Norfolk County, Ontario

Overview
- Owner: Grand Trunk Railway (first owner); Canadian National Railway (final owner)
- Locale: Norfolk County, Ontario, Canada

Service
- System: Grand Trunk Railway
- Services: Simcoe, Walsh, Vittoria, Forestville, Port Rowan

History
- Opened: 1886
- Closed: 1965

Technical
- Track gauge: 1,435 mm (4 ft 8 1/2 in) standard gauge

The South Norfolk Railway was incorporated in 1886, to construct a railway from Simcoe, Ontario to Port Rowan, Ontario.

== Summary ==
In 1887, the station was acquired by Grand Trunk Railway and was absorbed into their railway network.

Simcoe was already connected to the railway system by other railways. The South Norfolk Railway had intermediate stations at Vittoria, Walsh and Forestville. The proximity of Walsh's railway station to Young's Creek brought extra economical advantages to flour and lumber mills operating in the region. From a geographical perspective, Young's Creek originates about four kilometers northwest of the Walsh and passes through the village along with Vittoria before discharging into Lake Erie, 11 kilometres or 6.8 miles away in Port Ryerse. The level of industrialization that the South Norfolk Railway brought to Norfolk County would be impossible to replicate today because of the emphasis of railway services on established urban links instead of trying to expand to rural areas that desperately need railway travel.

A lawsuit was initiated in 1888 between the Port Rowan and Lake Shore Railway and the South Norfolk Railway.

The railway was eventually run by Canadian National Railway, which closed the line in 1965. Workers from the CNR would eventually remove the railroad tracks; thus reverting it to private property status.
