= Jacob R. Beamer =

Jacob R. Beamer (Beemer, Bemer) (born c. 1810) (fl. 1837–47) was a carpenter, innkeeper, and Canadian Patriot.

Beamer's father came from New Jersey in 1796 and settled in Norfolk County. It was in his tavern in 1837 that one part of the Upper Canada Rebellion was formulated. This was a rebellion against the British colonial government in 1837 and 1838. Charles Duncombe conducted the meeting at the tavern and the Beamers began recruiting and training troops. These troops headed for Toronto to join William Lyon Mackenzie but were met and defeated by Allan MacNab who led the government troops. Jacob surrendered, was released and fled to Niagara Falls in New York State where he remained active in the rebel cause.
