= Fatima (surname) =

Fatima is a surname. Notable people with the surname include:

- Altaf Fatima (1927–2018), Indian Urdu-language novelist
- Batool Fatima (born 1982), Pakistani cricketer
- Djoumbé Fatima (1837–1878), 19th-century queen of the sultanate of Mohéli
- Ghulam Fatima, known as Miss Fatima (1912– c. 1990), British-Indian chess master
- Ghulam Fatima (born 1995), Pakistani cricketer
- Maryam Fatima (born 1997), Pakistani model
- Rabab Fatima, Bangladeshi diplomat
- Sharifa Fatima (15th century), Yemeni Zaydi chief

== See also ==
- Fatima (disambiguation)
- Fatima (given name)
