= Annaleise Carr =

Canadian swimmer

- Born: March 12, 1998 (age 28); Norfolk County, Ontario, Canada
- Known for: Swimming, author & philanthropy
- Notable work: Long distance swimming

Annaleise Carr (born March 12, 1998) of Norfolk County, Ontario, Canada, was the youngest person to swim across Lake Ontario by the "traditional route" on Sunday, August 19, 2012 at the age of 14.

Annaleise had to qualify for this swim which was overseen by the regulated body and supervision of Solo Swims of Ontario. After qualifying and filing the 70 pages of paperwork a date was set August 18, 2012. With Lisa Anderson, her parents, grandparents, great grandparents and crew she was set with a huge flurry of media watching her leave as well as being on the water with her. Annaleise began her swim from Niagara-on-the-Lake (considered one of the world's most difficult open water swims) at 6:17:10 pm on August 18, 2012. She arrived at Marilyn Bell Park in Toronto after swimming for almost 27 hours, touching land at 8:58 pm on August 19, 2012. During her attempt, spectators received updates via live blogs, Twitter, and GPS live tracking.

During her swim Annaleise's fundraising increased to $60,000, $80,000 to over $100,000 after her swim. To date Annaleise has raised over $500,000 for the Children and families at Campfire Circle. At the time of her swim, Annaleise was the youngest person to cross Lake Ontario at 14 yrs 158 days and set an international record to be the youngest swimmer to swim continuously in open water for more than 24hrs (24 Hour Club). Annaleise's swim from Niagara-On-The-Lake to Toronto's Marilyn Bell Park when calculated through GPS; Annaleise swum close to 70 km due to being pushed off course due to currents and waves of approx 6 ft high pushing back toward Niagara-on-the-Lake.

== Swim across Lake Ontario ==
Annaleise began her swim from Niagara-on-the-Lake at 6:17:10 pm on August 18, 2012. She arrived at Marilyn Bell Park in Toronto after swimming for almost 27 hours, touching land at 8:58 pm on August 19, 2012. During her attempt, spectators received updates via live blogs, Twitter, and GPS live tracking. One of Annaleise's goals was to raise $30,000 for a summer camp for children with cancer. By 24 hours into the race, she had raised over $60,000 for the camp. Carr also set a record for being the youngest swimmer to swim in open waters for more than 24 hours By August 22, 2012, almost $140,000 had been raised in her name.

== Awards and accolades ==
- 2012 WOWSA Woman Of The Year
- Queen Elizabeth II Diamond Jubilee Medal
- Ontario Lieutenant Governor's Community Volunteer Pin
- 2012 Ontario Junior Citizen of the Year
- 2012 Canadian Sport Awards Spirit of Sport Story of the Year
- 2012 Inductee into the Norfolk County Sports Hall of Recognition
- 2012 TVO Kids "Super Citizen" Award
- #10 on CTV Kitchener Top 10 Stories of 2012
- In the 20 of 2012 on CHCH TV
- Finalist for Global Marathon Swimming Awards 2012 Solo Swim of the Year (Female)
- Simcoe & District Chamber of Commerce Community Service Award
- Rotary International Paul Harris Fellowship
- Lions International Melvin Jones Fellowship
- 2013 Independent Order of Foresters International Fraternal President's Award
- 2013 Honorary Commissioner of the Inaugural Maple Leaf sports & Entertainment Team Up challenge
- 2014 Haldimand/Norfolk Soroptimist "Violet Richardson Award" winner
- Named a member of Ripley's Aquarium Canada "Marine Teen" Youth Advisory Council
- 2014 Dr. Brian Luke Spirit of Trillium Award
- Presented the Peace Tower Canadian Flag from September 1, 2014 by Minister Diane Findley MP on behalf of PM Stephen Harper

== Notes ==
Trinity Arsenault became the youngest person to cross Lake Ontario on the "Traditional Route" on August 4, 2014, at 14 years 71 days old. Annaleise was 14 years 158 days old when she broke the previous record. Natalie Lambert at 14 years, 27 days in 2007 completed a 54 km crossing in 23:15 on a more easterly route surrounded by islands in the Kingston, ON area.
