= Backus Mill Heritage and Conservation Centre =

Defunct gristmill near Port Rowan, Ontario, Canada

Coordinates: 42.6427°N 80.4748°W

Backus Heritage Conservation Area
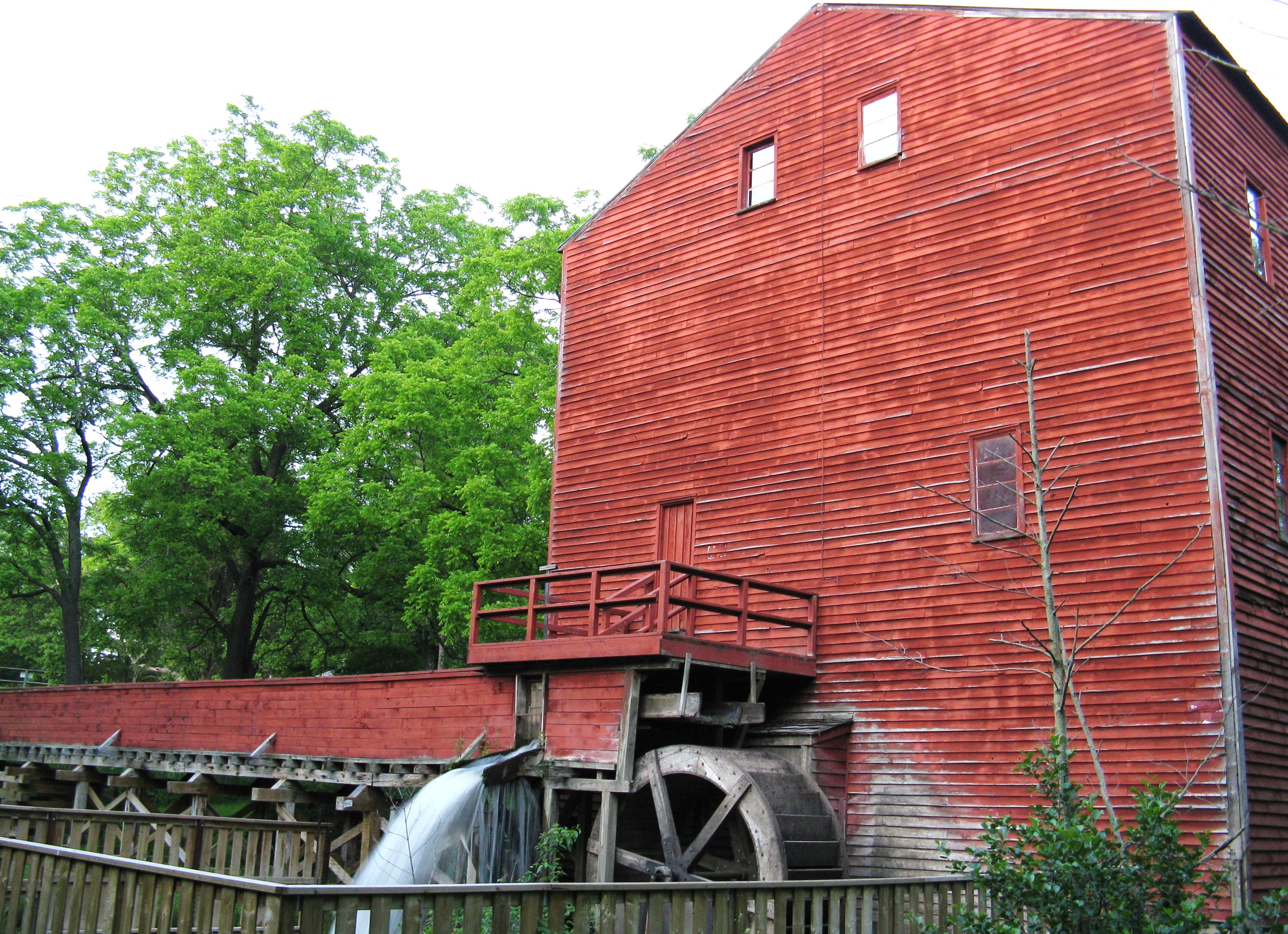
- Interactive map of Backus Heritage Conservation Area
- Location: Norfolk County, Ontario, Canada
- Elevation: 636 feet (194 m) above sea level
- Built: 1798
- Governing body: Parks Canada
- Website: Backus Mill

National Historic Site of Canada
- Designated: 1998 (plaqued in 2002)

The Backus Heritage Conservation Area is located in Norfolk County, Ontario, Canada.

== Summary ==
The area contains the Backhouse Mill (known in French as Moulin-à-Farine Backhouse, or Backhouse Grist Mill), a gristmill that was built in 1798. It was one of the few mills to not be burned during the War of 1812. The mill stayed in operation until 1957 and is now a national historic site.

The conservation area has facilities for both short-term and seasonal camping. This area is full of local history found in the Backhouse Homestead. In September, the area becomes the site of a reenactment of a battle during the War of 1812.

The Backus Mill Conservation Education Centre features exhibits about the area's natural history and traditions of waterfowl hunting.

The Heritage Village is an open-air museum that includes restored or reconstructed buildings and structures, including the 19th century Backhouse Homestead, Backhouse Mill, church, carriage shop, barn with agriculture equipment, drive shed with buggies and wagons, two log houses, schoolhouse, saw mill and farm and 19th century industrial equipment. The Museum building includes exhibits about the Long Point Area, 19th century period business displays, and an exhibit about the shipwrecks of Lake Erie at Long Point.

It also features a fully lifeguarded pool.
