= Fatma (surname) =

Fatma is a surname. Notable people with the surname include:

- Kara Fatma (1888–1955), a Turkish militia leader and soldier
- Tazeen Fatma (born 1949), Indian politician

== See also ==
- Fatima (given name), with Fatma as a variant form
