= Bairro de Fátima =

Coordinates: 22°55′00″S 43°11′20″W

- Region
- Location within Brazil
- Country: Brazil
- State: Rio de Janeiro
- City: Rio de Janeiro
- Time zone: UTC-3 (BRT)

Bairro de Fátima is a region of Rio de Janeiro, but not officially recognized as a neighborhood.
