= Port Rowan =

Community of Norfolk County, Ontario, Canada

Coordinates: 42°37′19.5″N 80°26′57.0″W

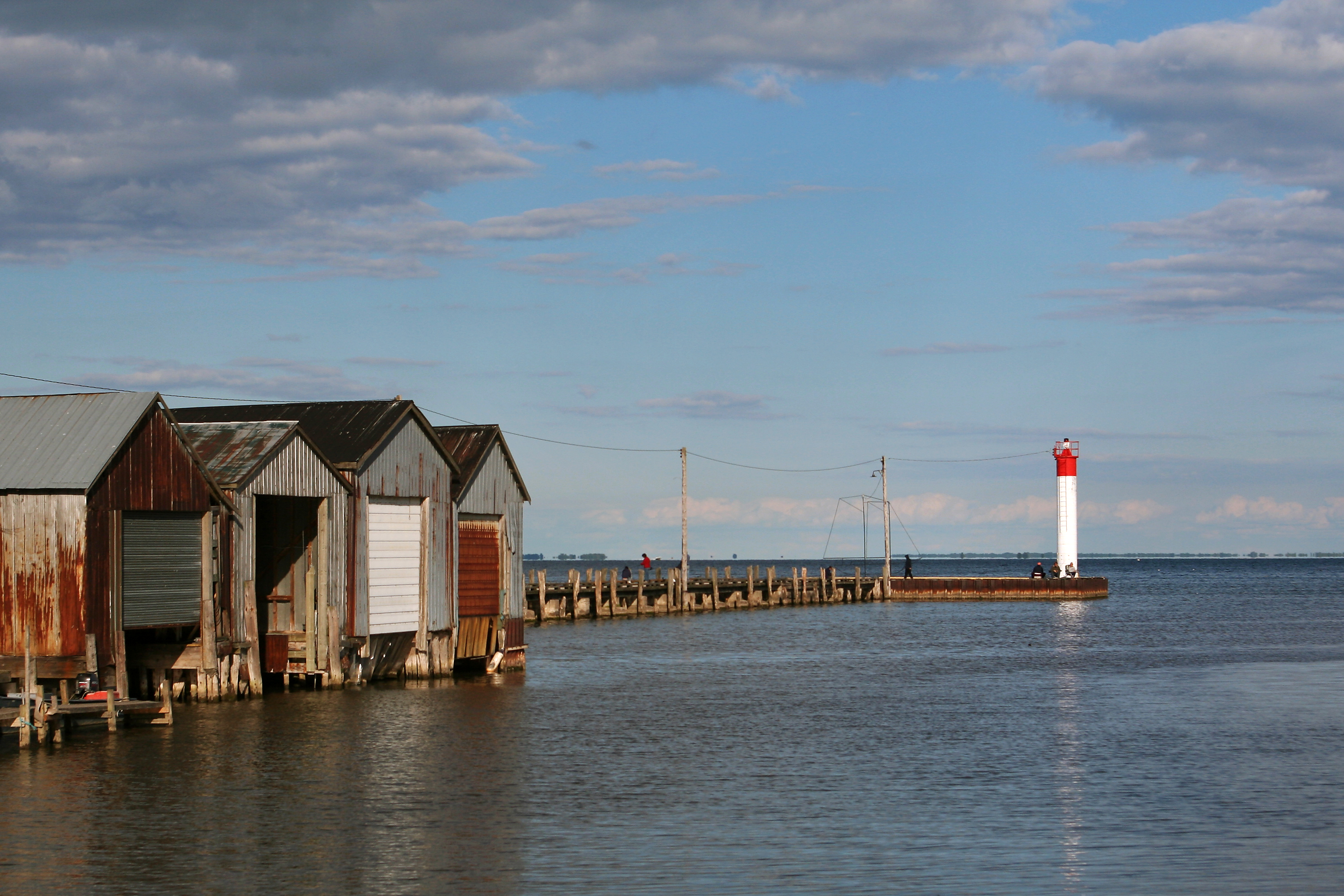
Lighthouse and docks, Port Rowan, ON

Port Rowan is a town in Norfolk County, Ontario, Canada. It is located on Lake Erie, adjacent to Long Point. The lakeside community has a population of 1,357 people as of 2021 and sports a number of traditional small businesses which have been operating in the town for decades.

While most of the streets have sidewalks, people are safer to walk in a single line. Walking in this community is possible on a year-round basis and most of the trails are gravel unlike Delhi or Langton where the trails are asphalt.

Port Rowan was the home of Robert F. Hill, a film director, screenwriter and actor who worked in Hollywood from the 1910s to the 1960s; specializing in silent films.

== History ==
Port Rowan's earliest known inhabitants, from around the year 1000 until approximately 300–350 years later, were the Algonquin nation. They were noted flint-workers and evidence of the skill in crafting arrowheads is still to be found in open worked field areas surrounding the hamlet. The next wave of inhabitants were the Attawandaron nation, the Neutrals, who occupied the region from about 1350 until their absorption by the Iroquois in the year 1651. The last significant native nation to occupy the area was the Mississaugas.

Key buildings, including John Backhouse`s mill, that date back to the 18th century, remain in existence today. During the War of 1812 American soldiers burned all the mills on Lake Erie`s north shore, from the St Clair River to the Grand River, except for the Backhouse mill, and one other. According to Ron Brown, in ″The Lake Erie Shore: Ontario's Forgotten South Coast″, Backhouse`s mill was skipped due to powerful connections within the USA.

The South Norfolk Railway reached Port Rowan in 1886. It was acquired by the Canadian National Railway, which operated it until 1965.

By the mid-1960s, Port Rowan was noted for its close proximity to hunting, fishing, and recreation. However, the practicing dentist of that time choose to retire after serving the community since the 1930s. As a result, approximately 6000 people were in dire need of a dentist.

In 1970 New Democratic Party MPP Morton Shulman asserted that Port Rowan was the destination of secret meetings of mafia leaders.

In 1974, Port Rowan was amalgamated with Houghton, North Walsingham, South Walsingham and part of Middleton township to form Norfolk township.

In 2001, Norfolk was amalgamated with Simcoe, Delhi and part of Nanticoke to form an enlarged Norfolk.

In 2017, Port Rowan was officially named the birdhouse capital of Canada.

== Demographics ==
The majority of Port Rowan's residents between 70–79 years of age as of 2016; meaning that most Port Rowan residents stopped being members of the active work force around 2006 and lack the computerized skills needed for many of today's jobs. Most of the residents were born in Canada, but there are 25 individuals who were born in the United States of America and nearly 200 people born in Europe. English is the most commonly spoken language there; although other languages are spoken by a fair amount of the residents. Females slightly outnumber males in this town; there are only 85 children and 400 adolescents and working-age adults.

Only 275 people who live in Port Rowan are gainfully employed while 10 people are unemployed and seeking work. There are 790 people in this community who are either retired, homemakers, or disabled to an extent that they can't work for a living.

== Attractions ==
For more than 30 years, Port Rowan hosted Bayfest which is an annual Labour Day celebration. The celebration was originally known as the Tomato Fest. Bayfest typically lasts for three days each year. The celebration usually features a parade, vendors, and fireworks.

The Port Rowan Wetlands were created in 1970 and provides a way for locals and tourists to experience live birds, snakes, and turtles. The trail in addition to the wetlands are open year-round and are easily accessible to wheelchair users.

Port Rowan Lion's Park is also an attractive place to find birds and snakes; with at least 71 species of bird found within the area in 2019 alone. Typical species found there are the Great blue heron, the Herring gull, and the Bonaparte's gull.

=== Cemetery ===
Bayview Cemetery is the town's historic cemetery; having individuals and families buried there as far back as the War of 1812. It is a United Empire Loyalists cemetery which has at least 498 individuals and/or families buried there. Winter grave decorations are permitted while live plants are not permitted to be on the cemetery grounds. Common last names found at the cemetery include Abbott, Backhouse, Backus, Bantam, Brown, and Chamberlain.

== Economy ==
During the 18th century fishing, milling, and timber processing were the main industries, exploiting the water power of nearby watercourses. In 1850 the town processed 4,000,000 metres or 13,000,000 feet of timber. 1850 marked the beginning of shipbuilding in Port Rowan.

With the decline of the fishing, lumber and milling industries, tourism is the main economic activity in the region. Local sports include angling and boating in the Long Point Inner Bay and golfing at Stark's Golf Course at the edge of town. Port Rowan is home to the headquarters of Birds Canada (formerly Bird Studies Canada), the country's only national bird conservation organization. Port Rowan in 2011 built a state of the art Water Treatment Plant, which assures future growth capacity in the town and its burgeoning retirement community.

Its proximity to Long Point, a major bird flight-path, and World Biosphere Reserve, makes Port Rowan a popular destination for bird-watchers. Some of the few remaining stands the old growth Carolinian forest that were present all over Southern Ontario can be found near Port Rowan.

There is a historic replica village nearby at the Backus Conservation Area.

On June 30, 2018, Port Rowan officially lost their only bank for business and personal transactions. Calls to Tillsonburg are considered to be long-distance to Port Rowan residents so that banking by phone simply isn't an option. The majority of the retirement population must choose between maintaining a vehicle on the road or having Internet access due to old age pension payments not matching up to the rising cost of goods and services. Although online banking has gained popularity in both urban and rural areas due to its fast and reliable service, none of the small businesses in Port Rowan were equipped to deal with Internet banking and may face significant financial difficulties in the future as a result. The Long Point Country Chamber of Commerce was attempting to attract a credit union in the town similar in nature to Tangerine but to no avail. Meanwhile, the well-established banks are removing their presence away from the rural communities of Ontario at a fast pace. Places like Service Ontario and the Backus Heritage Conservation Area are destined to face some form of setbacks as a result of the bank closure and may have to stop operating; leading to an almost-immediate loss of jobs in the area.

It was suggested that Port Rowan would experience Internet speeds and reliability comparable to Delhi by the year 2020 thanks to an underground cable system. This underground cable system would be similar to those found in communities like Langton, Courtland, and St. Williams, giving reliable broadband Internet access that was not normally found in the area during the start of the 21st century. There are plans to eventually the entirety of Southwestern Ontario into some form of high-speed Internet/cable television service sometime within the next 30 years.

== Climate ==
From the late 1990s onwards, winters became more mild due to changes in climate brought on by global warming. Port Rowan traditionally belongs to the humid continental climate zone, even with the recent mild winters and warmer dry summers. Like in all communities, towns, and cities throughout the world, global warming due to human industrial activity has drastically altered the climate of Port Rowan throughout the decades.

Port Rowan's first mild winter since Confederation occurred in the year 1975. The warmest summers that Port Rowan has witnessed occurred in 1998, 2003, 2005, 2006, 2007, 2009 (with the exception of the month of July), 2010, 2012, 2013, 2014, 2015 and 2016.

Should the sea levels rise by 60 metres or 200 feet, Port Rowan would not be affected by flooding. However, it may be affected by droughts as a by-product of the dislocation of available freshwater and may be forced to rely on desalinated salt water piped in from the Eastern United States. Constructing the proper infrastructure to carry the water hundreds of miles away would take considerable manpower along with significant economic costs and an unprecedented level of cooperation from multiple federal, state/provincial, and municipal governments.
