= Ontario tobacco belt =

Tobacco growing region in Ontario, Canada

Coordinates: 42.78822°N 80.433998°W

The Ontario tobacco belt is the tobacco-growing region located in Norfolk County and eastern Elgin County in Southwestern Ontario, Canada. The region is close to the north shore of Lake Erie, with a moderate climate and sandy, silt-loam soils that are well-suited to a wide variety of crops.

High-value horticultural crops thrive in this region, including 90% of all tobacco grown in Canada. Members of Parliament elected to ridings in the Ontario tobacco belt have strong pro-tobacco policies in addition to other policies in the interest of their rural constituents. Historically, the Ontario tobacco belt is composed of the rural area immediately surrounding the towns of Delhi, Aylmer and Tillsonburg. Additional tobacco farms can be found in Nova Scotia, New Brunswick, and near Joliette, Quebec.

== History ==
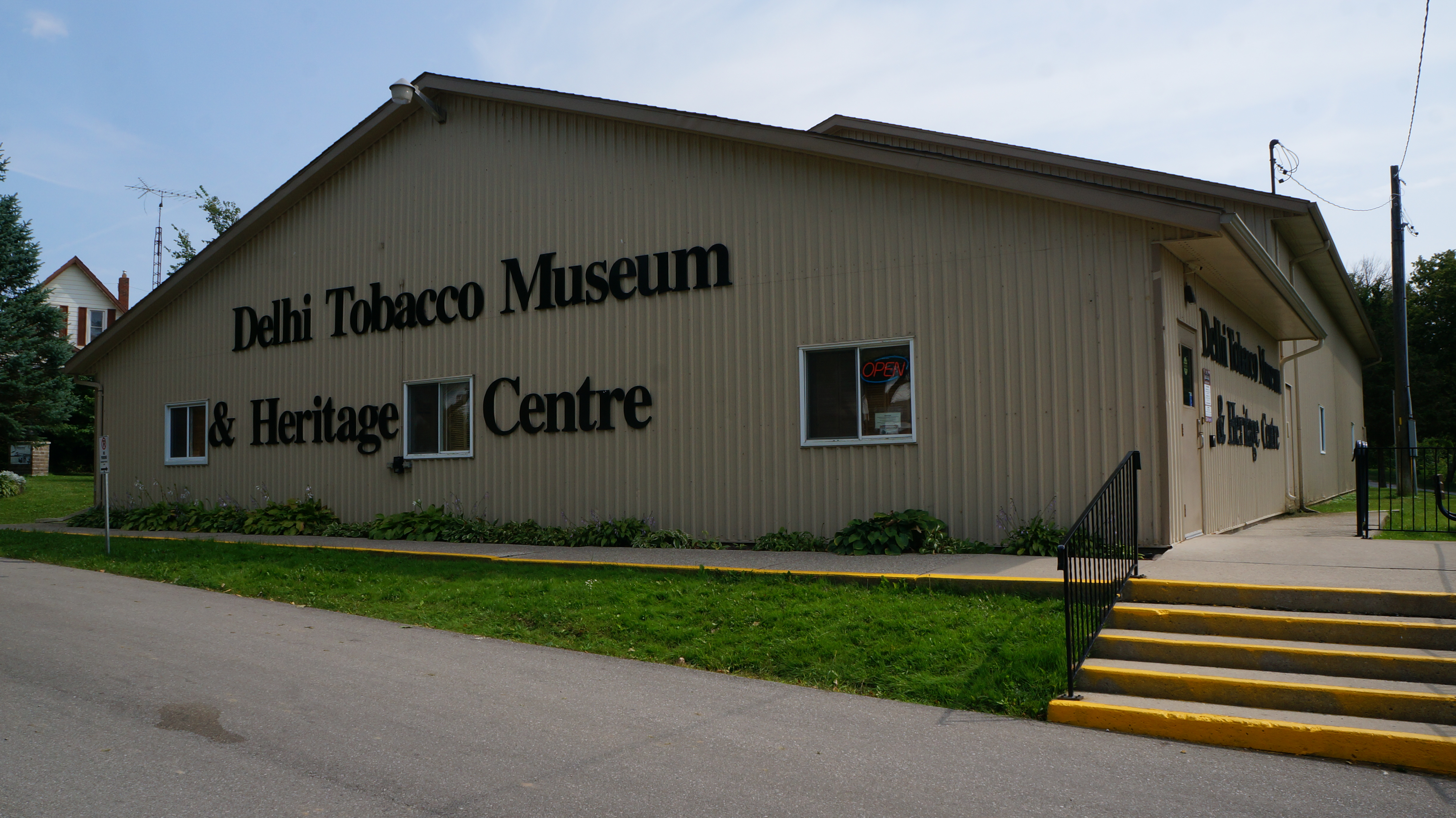
Delhi Tobacco Museum & Heritage Centre

United Empire Loyalists introduced the tobacco crop after fleeing northwards from their established farms following the American Revolution. However, the first official tobacco plot wasn't planted in Norfolk County until 1920.

From the beginning of the 20th century to the 1960s, the coastal portion of the Ontario tobacco belt was threatened with desertification. Only by planting coniferous seedlings was the desertification finally stopped. More than 25% of Norfolk County is considered to be forested.

The Ontario tobacco belt experienced its economic zenith during the 1950s and 1960s. During those decades, most communities in the Ontario belt (as well as their residents) were reasonably affluent from the economic gains that the tobacco farms made. The song Tillsonburg by classic country music performer Stompin' Tom Connors captured the hard working spirit of the Ontario tobacco belt during the middle of the 20th century. A devastating tornado that started in nearby Woodstock devastated several tobacco farms in the tobacco belt in 1979. That tornado was the most severe in the area to date.

In the early 2000s, the main cigarette factory in the area, Imperial Tobacco, moved overseas to Brazil to continue production. As the older farmers retire, their children will most likely seek different career paths. Tobacco farms would eventually be sold to their neighbours; this has a domino effect. This domino effect ultimately results in fewer farmers having more acreage creating a further sense of economic inequality in the area.

=== Recent history ===
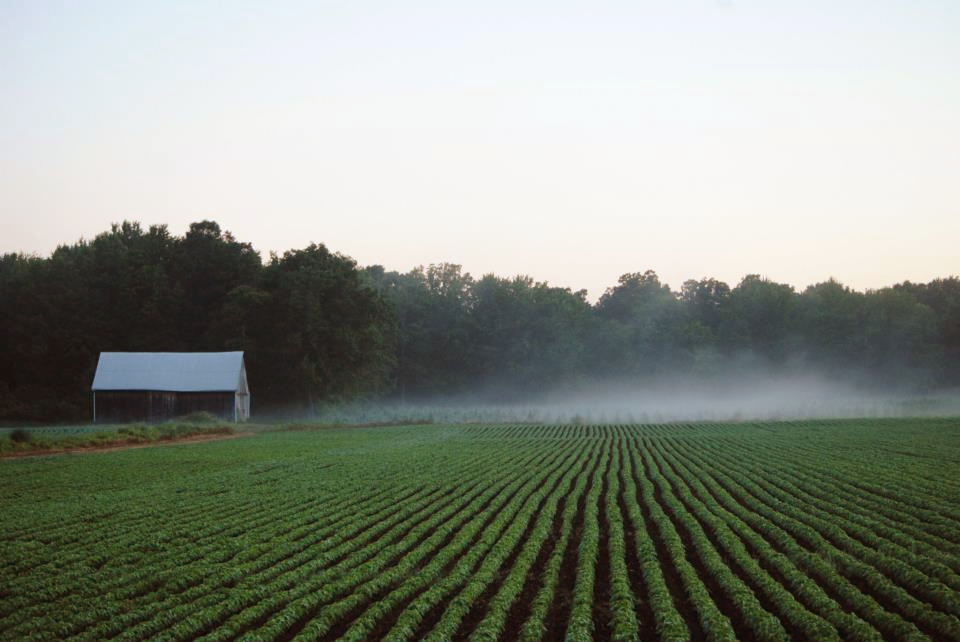
Tobacco farm in Norfolk County, summer 2012.

The longstanding dominance of tobacco in the region has been on the wane in recent years. In 2002, politicians from the Ontario tobacco belt opposed several anti-smoking measures, causing a non-smoking group to give the Ontario government a failing grade at that time. The tobacco belt members of Provincial Parliament were responsible for scaling back a proposed tobacco tax from $10/carton to $5/carton. They failed to implement a public smoking ban (until the Smoke Free Ontario law was passed in 2006). On August 8, 2008, tobacco farmers in this region were given $300 million to buy out their entire tobacco quota. All of the money was raised from a $1,000,000,000 fine against Imperial Tobacco and Rothman's Benson & Hedges. After receiving the money, farmers that signed the buy-out are permitted to grow any crop except for tobacco; switching to raising livestock like cattle, poultry, or pigs is completely legal under this plan.

Only about one thousand farm families still produce tobacco in the entire belt. Motivation to cease tobacco farming has been accelerated by health issues and high tobacco taxes. Farmers who never agreed to the tobacco buy-out may grow as much tobacco as their farmland allows through a special tobacco growing licence that was created on the week of May 15, 2009. Relatives of the farmers (either blood relatives or relatives through marriage) who agreed to the buy-out can still grow tobacco on the original farmer's land with a tobacco growing licence. However, this right does not extend to the farmer himself who can still manage the farm but not own it in his name. Farmers must also find a company that will buy his product; otherwise he cannot grow tobacco until next year. Attempts by local youth sports leagues to prohibit the usage of tobacco amongst players, coaches, referees, and even spectators has been successful in a region that was once dominated by the massive profits of Big Tobacco.

Currently, Tillsonburg is under a strict bylaw aimed at reducing levels of outdoor second-hand smoke. This by-law was passed on May 14, 2012 by Tillsonburg Town council; prohibiting the usage of tobacco and tobacco-related products within 9 metres or 30 feet of certain buildings intended for families and/or children.

=== Jobs ===
Most of the Ontario tobacco belt also belongs to the Green Energy Hub; an environmental region in Southern Ontario that is dedicated to creating "green" jobs through solar panels, wind turbines, and recycled rain water. Delhi, once considered to be the "heart of the Ontario tobacco belt," historically had transient adolescent workers that could find employment quickly. The local police force started to take a less tolerant stand towards these job seekers in the later years when they started to threaten the employment of local workers.

As urbanization continues to claim the Niagara Peninsula, displaced farmers will come to the Ontario tobacco belt seeking acres of land to farm. European farmers have bought farmland in massive amounts throughout the course of the Great Recession; fleeing the bleak prospect of farming land between airstrips in their native Europe. Their expertise in growing non-tobacco crops will forever change the economy of communities like Tillsonburg and Delhi. Tobacco labourers will easily transition over into their new jobs in horticulture labour. Most of the jobs will involve heavy labour and no additional skills would be needed for the Jamaican and Mexican transient labourers who "reside" in the tobacco belt region from March to November. Farm operators within the Ontario tobacco belt are 55 years old on average as of December 14, 2012 because operating a farm consists of long hours, intensive physical labour and little pay. Despite the recent economic woes, young people find greater job security working at urban office jobs than operating a rural farm in either Norfolk or Oxford County.

Factories once operated in the Ontario tobacco belt; especially in the town of Simcoe. During the 42 years that it was operating, the metal-can manufacturing plant owned by The American Can Company employed many local residents. The Canadian Canning Company, which had been in operation in Simcoe since the 1870s, was a primary customer for some of the products of the American Can Plant, and was a producer of canned fruit, vegetable, and processed prepared foodstuffs, such as soup. This processing plant relied heavily on fruit and vegetables produced locally. In 1991, the Robinson Street manufacturing plants closed. The shutdown of the plants can be partially attributed to the recession of the early 1990s.

Delhi Industries and Delhi Foundry once offered non-tobacco jobs to Delhi. They both eventually closed due to the changing Canadian economy that emphasized more on service jobs than jobs in traditional manufacturing fields. Delhi Industries lasted until the midst of the Canadian economic recession when it closed down in March 2010; terminating 61 Canadian jobs on a permanent basis. They once made fans and blowers for industrial operations in the region. 2600 people have officially joined the Norfolk County workforce between June 2012 and June 2013. Businesses have been expanding throughout Norfolk County again; often hiring people two at a time. Innovative business running measures are also improving the quality of life for Norfolk County residents who are members of the workforce. The economy of the Greater Toronto Area along with the rest of the world may become further interconnected with the changing economy of the Ontario tobacco belt.

The well-established banks are removing their presence away from the rural communities of the Ontario tobacco belt at a fast pace. Places like Service Ontario and the Backus Heritage Conservation Area may have to shutter their doors after the departure of CIBC; leading to an almost-immediate loss of jobs within the tobacco belt.

== Climate ==
=== Historic ===
The traditional climate for most of the Ontario tobacco belt has witnessed temperatures as low of −7.8 °C (18.0 °F) in January and as high as 25.6 °C (78.1 °F) in July. The winter of 1975 was the only unusually mild winter in the Ontario tobacco belt from 1877 to 1977.

Even the traditional climate was considered to be inhospitable for some as the threat of desertification raged on from the early 20th century through the 1960s. Only by planting coniferous seedlings did the Ontario tobacco belt started to become a more friendly climate for tobacco production.

Historically, the hottest temperatures in the Ontario tobacco belt were recorded on July 9, 1936 with Delhi registering temperatures up to 40.6 °C or 105.1 °F.

=== Modern ===
An overnight frost in the early fall of 1999 damaged the unharvested crops of one hundred local tobacco farms; Norfolk County, Brant County, and Oxford County were affected in the disaster. An official reading of 35.7 °C or 96.3 °F from the Delhi weather station recorded on July 7, 2012 has seen rising temperatures become a nearly unstoppable trend in the Ontario tobacco belt.

When temperatures in the Ontario tobacco belt manage to reach a high of beyond 30 °C or 86 °F, overall crop yields can be reduced as much as 1% per day; leading to potential crop failures months ahead of the proper harvest schedule. The number of days that the Ontario tobacco belt spends in temperatures in excess of 30 °C or 86 °F are rising due to shifting weather patterns. Within the next 20 years, the industrial character of Norfolk, Brant and Oxford counties might have to change in order to adapt to the difficulties that future farmers will face concerning the well-being of their crops.

However, with the summer temperatures of 2009 having been the coldest since 1816, the number of successful tobacco and food crops were fewer and more expensive because of fears of an early frost that never quite surfaced in 2009. The same effect was felt months after the severe December 22–28 blizzard with the subsequent blizzards on February 5–6, 2010 and on February 25–27 of that same year. There were two outbreaks of blizzards that occurred in this area between January 25 and February 2, 2011. After the start of 2012, the effects of the March 2012 North American heat wave has rendered virtually all snowfall in this area non-existent for the first time since the winter of 1994–95. The heat wave has also shattered all of the temperature records throughout the Ontario tobacco belt along with the rest of Southern Canada and parts of North America. This heat wave has extended itself into the summer months. During August 2012, only parts of South America and Northern Australia experienced temperatures that were cooler than usual. The heat wave officially ended in early November 2012 when local temperatures plunged below 10 °C or 50 °F.

Between December 2012 and April 2013, temperatures managed to return to normal seasonal levels for the Ontario tobacco belt along with most of Ontario. While May and June 2013 has seen temperatures that were slightly above normal, July 2013 has seen the return of extremely warm temperatures. Temperatures did not return to normal seasonal patterns until the middle of October 2013. However, the 2013–14 North American cold wave victimized Norfolk County from January to mid-April 2014 with unusually frequent cases of blizzards and snowstorms. An expected heat wave for the summer months of 2014 never emerged, meaning that temperatures in the Ontario tobacco belt have remained close to normal.

The months of April and May 2015 saw temperatures that went directly from being unseasonably cold to unseasonably warm and back to unseasonably cold without any moderate weather in between. Cloudy days with high winds dominate the colder days while the unseasonably warm weather brought about threats of thunderstorms during the evening hours.

The temperatures from June to early September 2015 were seen as unusually warm and/or muggy. Thunderstorms and essential rainfall was deemed to be few and far in-between; with normal seasonal temperatures returning around late September of that year.

The winter of 2016 experienced a lack of snowfall not seen since the winter of 2012. While the summer months of 2016 were as equally dry and hot as the summer of 2015, it was considerably more windy in 2016 than it was in 2015. The dry summer affected everything from trees to wildlife to the water levels for Lake Erie. Rain finally returned around October and November 2016 when the cold front needed to produce precipitation was finally created in order to fight the dominant warm front.

== Replacements for tobacco ==
=== Horticulture and animal farming ===
Compared to 1998, tobacco farming is down by 60% and falling. It is possible that this tobacco industry will never recover and disappear forever. Calls to action by local residents to diversify the tobacco belt into other industries have been slow in being answered by Norfolk County council. Diversification into several different types of products could help the region absorb the ups and downs of a changing economy. The winter hardiness and soil requirements of lavender are equivalent to that of tobacco; meaning that an "Ontario horticultural belt" could see the economy revolve around lavender plants rather than tobacco plants.

Tobacco farmers in this region have to deal with the same issues that haunt European tobacco farmers; farmers are told to grow different crops or go out of business. However, it is difficult to adjust to the changing supply and demand when most farmers are in heavy debt. The economic fallout from the Canadian economic recession also played in role in declining tobacco sales and farmers going deeper into debt. There are also good opportunities for wineries, peanut farms, poultry farms, and apiaries to fill the void that tobacco leaves behind economically. Most of these alternative crops are either grown or raised in Norfolk County; that is where the cash crush of a declining tobacco market is affecting the most people.

=== Wind generators ===
Wind generators have been used extensively in the Port Rowan area and in the southwestern part of Norfolk County (particularly near Lake Erie). Port Rowan has seen some wind generators installed in the northern end of their community near their active adult community; but were dismantled after the local people starting protesting. Most of them are seen near the communities of Clear Creek, Jacksonburg, Houghton Centre, and Hemlock. Port Dover (on the easternmost part of the Ontario tobacco belt) has been declared to be the site of future wind generators. Norfolk County has banned the placement of new wind turbines after becoming a "willing host" for them back in 2003. One of the council members were worried about Norfolk County becoming "industrialized" and "unnatural." Many leaders in Norfolk County envision the surrounding area as being an agricultural hub for Southern Ontario even by the middle of the 22nd century.

By harvesting the local wind energy, it is assumed that electricity could be created closer to home without using fossil fuels and without polluting the atmosphere or the water that people need to live. However, one of the side effects has been the unexplained killing of the bald eagle species that is being rehabilitated in the area. Wind energy supporters have stated in the past that fossil fuel-based power plants affect the birds in a less humane manner.

The cost of the wind generator devices (approximately $4 million CAD per unit) has caused the short-term price of hydroelectric energy to increase as it became more expensive to deliver the needed energy due to complications with the electricity grid. While rent has remained very cheap (approximately 870 Canadian dollars a month) by global standards in Brantford, the rising cost of electricity has made the typical restaurant meal in that city to be very expensive (with the cost of a meal between 10.50 Canadian dollars a person for lunch to 67.50 Canadian dollars a person for an elegant dinner); particularly when compared to other communities within Southern Ontario.

The conventional Ontario electricity grid had become dependent on fossil fuels, transformers, and nuclear energy for decades before the wind turbines started appearing. However, these concerns are negated by wind energy proponents who say that the turbines could lead to electricity price reductions through lower natural gas prices (due to the reductions in natural gas demand).

The use of fossil fuels is becoming less frequent amongst both rural and urban people as it becomes more expensive. Alternative fuels (like wind energy from the nearby Erie Shores Wind Farm and all solar energy projects done in this area in the future) will eventually relegate the use of fossil fuels to the Middle East and to developing countries. These alternatives will be cheaper and cleaner than the energy forms that rely on fossil fuels. The increasingly frequent use of alternative clean fuels (such as wind, and solar) will help reduce pollution from fossil fuel use, and mitigate global warming.

== In popular culture ==
- "Tillsonburg" by Stompin' Tom Connors
- "Built on Sand" by Will Carson
