= Our Lady of Fatima Catholic School =

Location
- Norfolk County; Courtland, Ontario; Canada; 42.83747°N 80.63430°W

Information
- School type: Catholic Elementary School Catholic
- Motto: A Small School with a Big Heart
- Religious affiliation: Roman Catholic
- Opened: 1959
- Status: 1959-present
- Sister school: Our Lady of LaSallete
- Principal: K. Wilkinson
- Teaching staff: J. Whyte- Educational Assistant; T. Fields- Educational Assistant; M. Evans - EA; T. Van de ven - E.C.E.
- Grades: K-8
- Enrolment: 113 (31 October 2011)
- Language: English
- Hours in school day: 8:45 AM - 3:05 PM
- Classrooms: 6
- Slogan: Small School with a Big Heart
- Mascot: Bulldog
- Nickname: Fatima
- Feeder to: Holy Trinity Catholic High School (Simcoe)
- Website: www.ourladyoffatimacourtland.ca

Our Lady of Fatima is a Roman Catholic school in Courtland, Ontario, Canada. The school motto is Small School with a Big Heart and the principal is Terry Dunnigan. The school is part of the Brant Haldimand Norfolk Catholic District School Board. This school contains six classrooms, one portable, one library/tech room, one small gymnasium, one staff lounge, four student washrooms, one staff washroom, two change rooms, one kitchen, and two janitor's closets. In approximately 2007, the CN company in Toronto recognized the school as being "too" small, and at the time having less than 100 students. They suggested that closing the school would be the best option for the school board, and send the students and the highest seniority staff to another nearby school in the same board. Although the decision was highly considered by the school board, a meeting was held in the school's gymnasium, and based on board official, staff, and parent opinions, decided not to close the school.

== History ==
Our Lady of Fatima opened in September 1959 in the basement of the current school's neighbouring church. Due to ongoing construction of the school students were learning in the church basement for the next few months. A few months later the students and staff moved into a two-room school. Over the decades the school has undergone 2 more additions, making it the 5 classroom, 1 portable school it is today.

== Charity and fundraisers ==
Our Lady of Fatima has been involved in many charity events and charity related fund-raisers throughout its past few years, such as the Souper Bowl, where staff and students generously bring in cans of condensed soups to help the local food bank.
