= Norfolk County, Ontario =

Norfolk County
- City (single-tier)
- Norfolk County
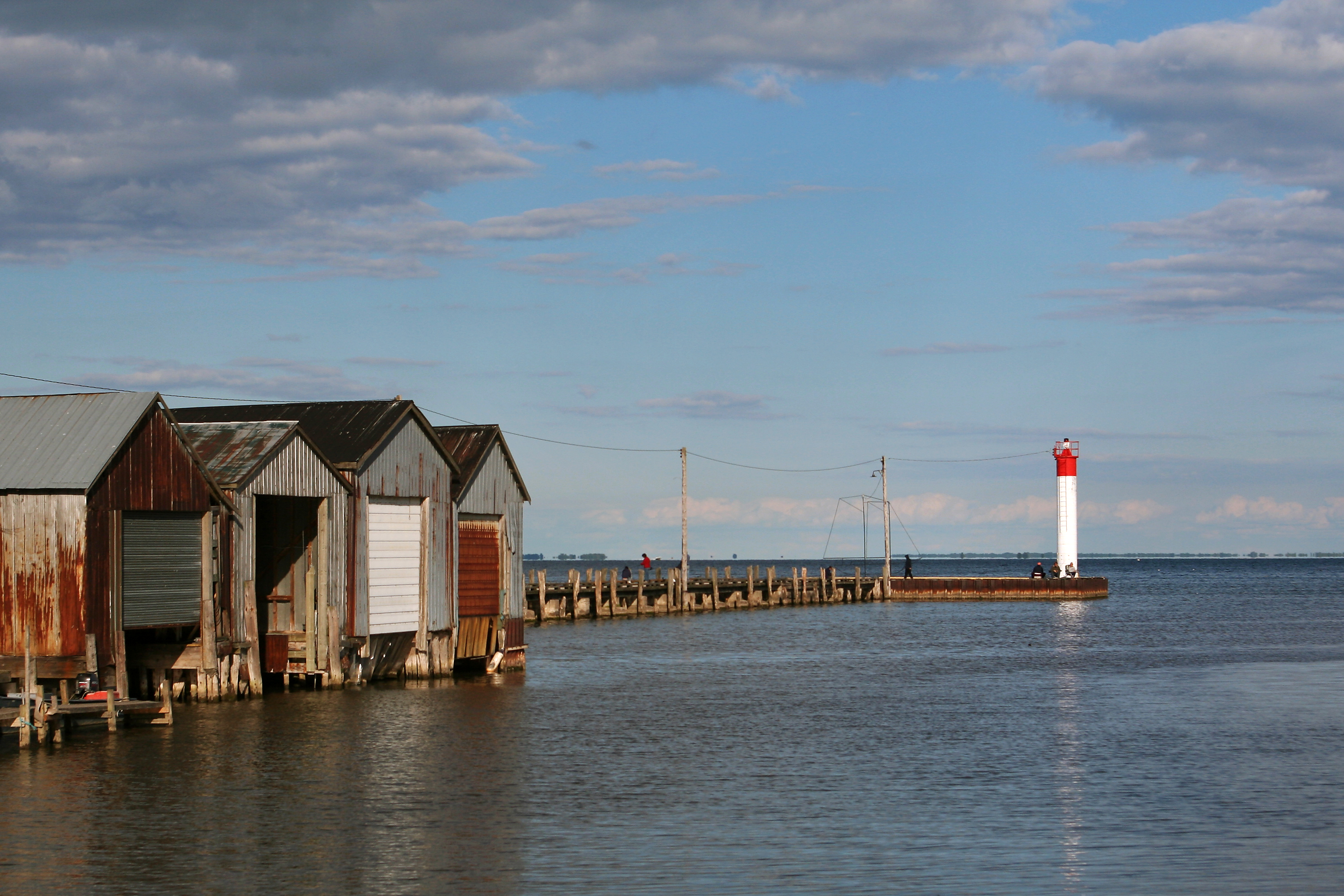
- Lighthouse and docks in Port Rowan.

- Flag Coat of arms
- Motto: History Heritage and Diversity

- Coordinates: 42°51′N 80°16′W
- Country: Canada
- Province: Ontario
- Established: 1792
- Incorporated: 1974 as a result of amalgamation of Houghton, part of Middleton, North Walsingham, South Walsingham and Port Roman
- Amalgamated: 2001 with Delhi, Simcoe and part of Nanticoke

Government
  - Mayor: Adam Veri
  - Governing Body: The Council of The Corporation of Norfolk County
  - MPs: Leslyn Lewis
  - MPPs: Bobbi Ann Brady (I)

Area
  - Land: 1,607.55 km^{2} (620.68 sq mi)
- Elevation: 200 m (660 ft)

Population (2023)
  - Total: 73,015
  - Density: 39.8/km^{2} (103/sq mi)
- 86th
- Time zone: UTC-5 (EST)
  - Summer (DST): UTC-4 (EDT)
- Postal code span: N0A, N0E, N3Y, N4B
- Area codes: 519, 226, and 548
- Website: www.norfolkcounty.ca

Norfolk County (/ˈnɔːrfoʊk/ NOR-fohk) is a rural single-tier municipality on the north shore of Lake Erie in Southwestern Ontario, Canada with a 2023 population of 73,015. Despite its name, it is no longer a county by definition, as all municipal services are handled by a single level of government. The largest community in Norfolk County is Simcoe, whose 2021 population was 16,121. The other population centres are Port Dover, Delhi, Waterford and Port Rowan, and there are many smaller communities. For several years in the late 20th century, the county was merged with Haldimand County but the merged entity was dissolved in 2000.

== Geography ==
Located on the Norfolk Sand Plain in the Carolinian Life Zone, Norfolk County's soil type is sandy loam, the most fertile land in Ontario. With a mild climate and lengthy growing season, the region has long been the centre of the Ontario tobacco belt. However, many farmers have begun the process of diversifying their crop selections to include fruits and vegetables, lavender, ginseng, hazelnuts, and wolfberries as tobacco consumption continues to decrease.

A significant natural feature of Norfolk is Long Point, a 40 kilometre (25 mi) spit of land projecting into Lake Erie. It plays an important part in eastern North American bird migration, and was designated a World Biosphere Reserve by UNESCO in 1986. Both the Long Point National Wildlife Area and the Long Point Provincial Park are located on the point. More than 25% of Norfolk County is considered to be forested; especially near the major communities and hamlets that dot the county.

The county seat and largest community is Simcoe. Other population centres are Port Dover, Delhi and Waterford.

== History ==
=== Prehistory ===
The area of modern-day Norfolk County was a focus for the Princess Point culture (c. 500 AD – 1000 AD) late in its development. Early Princess Point activity was clustered around the marshy peninsula of Princess Point near Hamilton. The Princess Point people likely were the first to introduce maize agriculture to Ontario, gradually migrating westward toward the Grand River and its fertile floodplains as they did so. This migration continued southward toward Norfolk County, whose better-drained sandy soil was more suitable for maize-growing.

=== Initial European settlement ===
By 1669, the French explorers De Galinee and Dollier de Casson had reached what is now Port Dover. They erected a cross with the arms of France claiming sovereignty for King Louis XIV over the Lake Erie region on March 23, 1670. A history of the area written in 1898 indicates an even earlier visit to what is now Norfolk County, in October 1626, by a Recollet priest, Laroche-Daillon with two Frenchmen Grenolle and La Vallee. The priest spent three months with the Neutrals First Nation. The same account also indicates that two Jesuits, Breboeuf and Chaurnonot, visited the Neutrals in this area in 1640.

The first European to live in the area, with the Neutrals, was William (Billy) Smith, son of Abraham Smith. He eventually settled near the current Port Rowan in 1793. This was in the first community, the Long Point Settlement (near what is now Port Rowan), where mills were built by United Empire Loyalist settlers. In the subsequent years, sawmills and grist mills were opened and the population increased. After the town site was surveyed in the late 1700s, the area was called Charlotte Villa and was later renamed Charlotteville.

=== 19th Century ===
Norfolk County was originally created in July 1792 as a constituency for the purposes of returning a member to the new Legislative Assembly of Upper Canada, and was described as having the following territory:

... to be bounded on the north and east by the county of Lincoln and the River La Tranche, now called the Thames, on the south side by the lake Erie until it meets the Barlue (sic), to be called the Orwell River, thence by a line running north sixteen degrees west until it intersects the river La Tranche or Thames, thence up the said river until it meets the northwest boundary of the county of York.

Norfolk County was reduced in size in 1798, with parts going to the counties of Oxford, Middlesex and Haldimand, and became part of the London District. It consisted of the following townships:

- Charlotteville
- Houghton
- Middleton
- Rainham
- Townsend
- Walpole
- Walsingham
- Windham
- Woodhouse

In 1826, the townships of Rainham and Walpole were moved to Haldimand County in Niagara District because of their distance from the London courthouse.

The community that is now Simcoe was first settled when Lieutenant-Governor Simcoe gave land to Aaron Culver in 1795 on the agreement that he would build mills. After they were in operation, a hamlet formed by 1812, although it was burned down by American troops in 1814. Between 1819 and 1823 Culver laid out a village; streets were surveyed in 1835 to 1836 or 1837. The settlement initially consisted of two distinct areas, Birdtown, named by William Bird who arrived in the early 1800s and the Queensway which grew up around Culver's sawmill and grist mill in the 1820s. The post office opened in 1829 and was called Simcoe.

The County had an important role during the War of 1812. Fort Norfolk was built in Charlotteville (near Vittoria and Normandale) in 1813 with accommodation for 300 troops. The Battle of Nanticoke, against American troops, was an important event in 1813. In August 1812, Major General Isaac Brock gathered a force of about regulars and militia at Port Dover. Using boats on the lake, they reached Amherstburg (also in Upper Canada) and then attacked and captured the American Hull's Army at Detroit. American forces in 1814 burnt Port Dover, Port Ryerse and the Walsingham settlement.

In 1837, Norfolk County was separated from the London District to form Talbot District, and Simcoe was declared to be the district town. At the beginning of 1850, the district was abolished, being replaced by Norfolk County for municipal purposes.

Because the county was heavily forested, logging became a major industry between 1860 and 1880. Agriculture was even more important however, with wheat being the primary crop until 1880 and then corn and oats.

The South Norfolk Railway was started in the county and began operating in 1889. Even earlier, the Hamilton and Lake Erie Railway (H&LER) began operating in 1873 but was merged with the Hamilton and North-Western Railway which completed the final section to Port Dover and to Jarvis in the mid 1870s.

==== Historic townships ====
Townships of Norfolk County in 1798:

- Charlotteville
- Houghton
- Middleton
- Rainham
- Townsend
- Walpole
- Walsingham
- Windham
- Woodhouse

In 1826, the townships of Rainham and Walpole were moved to Haldimand County in Niagara District because of their distance from the London courthouse. Walsingham was originally one township, but had been split into North and South Walsingham in 1881.

Prior to its amalgamation with Haldimand in 1974, Norfolk consisted of eight townships. Although no longer political entities, they are still geographic townships that figure in the legal description of lands for surveying purposes, and their areas are still shown on maps for convenience.

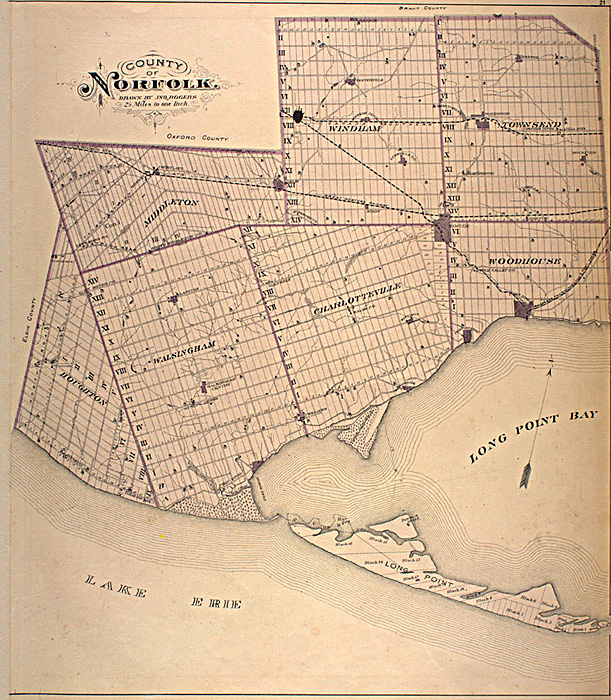
Map of Norfolk County from 1877, showing historical townships.

| Township | Township seat |
|---|---|
| Charlotteville | Vittoria |
| Houghton | Fairground |
| Middleton | Delhi |
| North Walsingham | Langton |
| South Walsingham | Port Rowan |
| Townsend | Waterford |
| Windham | Windham Centre |
| Woodhouse | Port Dover |

=== 20th Century ===
By the early 1900s, orchards and canning crops were more typical. A major switch to tobacco began in 1920.

By the 1920s tourism was an important contributor to the economy. Summer resorts in Port Dover, Port Ryerse, Normandale, Fisher's Glen, Turkey Point and Port Rowan were attracting many summer visitors. However, Norfolk was primarily agricultural with fruit and vegetables the primary crops. On report from 1924 states that "Norfolk apples have become pre-eminent in two hemispheres"; thousands of barrels of apples were shipped each year and canning was also a major industry, with companies such as Dominion Canners and St. Williams Fruit Preservers. There were a few factories too, in Port Dover and Waterford, while Port Dover was a major fishing centre, with fish shipped not only within Canada but also to the U.S.

A report from 1924 also discusses an electric railway that had been introduced "in recent years". This was the Grand River Railway that connected Hespeler, Berlin (later called Kitchener) and Waterloo with connection to Brantford and Port Dover:

Probably the most important achievement of recent years in Norfolk has been the introduction of an electric railway service, by which the produce of this rich agricultural region can be speedily transported to urban markets, and which has greatly benefited Norfolk people by the facility with which short distance travelling may now be accomplished. In addition, Norfolk's chief lake port has reaped untold benefit from the new radial service and the prospect for future recognition of Port Dover as Lake Erie's foremost port is very bright, particularly if the latent harbor facilities receive long overdue assistance from the Federal Government.

=== Norfolk Township ===
In 1974, the townships of Houghton, North Walsingham, South Walsingham, part of Middleton and the village of Port Rowan amalgamated to form the township of Norfolk. This was on the advice of a report by Milt Farrow, a "special advisor" appointed by the Government of Ontario. This political unit existed from 1974 to 2000.

On January 1, 2001, Norfolk amalgamated with Delhi, Simcoe and part of Nanticoke to form an enlarged Norfolk. This municipality immediately changed its official name to Norfolk County—and special advisor Milt Farrow later said in published interviews that he should have recommended those names. Since they no longer have townships or other municipal subdivisions below them, both municipalities are not true "county" governments in the traditional sense; they are legally classified as cities.

=== Norfolk becomes larger ===
The Townships of Delhi and Norfolk, the Town of Simcoe, and the western half of the City of Nanticoke were amalgamated to form the "Town of Norfolk". Moreover, many smaller communities such as Port Dover and Port Rowan are now in "Norfolk County". The newly formed municipality's first by-law was to change the name to Norfolk County.

In January 2005, the county unveiled a new coat of arms which included natural symbols associated with the county: hooded warblers, a tulip tree (Liriodendron tulipifera) and an eastern dogwood flower.

The first mayor of the county, Rita Kalmbach, was succeeded in 2007 by Dennis Travale, who served two terms as mayor. Charlie Luke succeeded him and served one term as mayor. Kristal Chopp was elected in 2018 and was succeeded in 2022 by Amy Martin. A transit system was introduced in Norfolk County in 2010.

Knowledgepool Collective Intelligence Corp. has invested in Norfolk County bringing technology and innovation companies such as a Data Centre, an Electric Vehicle Charging Manufacturer, and Internet of Things development companies to Norfolk.

== Climate ==
Climate data for Delhi (1991−2020 normals, extremes 1934–present)
| Month | Jan | Feb | Mar | Apr | May | Jun | Jul | Aug | Sep | Oct | Nov | Dec | Year |
|---|---|---|---|---|---|---|---|---|---|---|---|---|---|
| Record high °C (°F) | 18.3 (64.9) | 18.8 (65.8) | 27.3 (81.1) | 29.5 (85.1) | 33.4 (92.1) | 36.7 (98.1) | 40.6 (105.1) | 36.7 (98.1) | 36.1 (97.0) | 31.7 (89.1) | 25.0 (77.0) | 19.5 (67.1) | 40.6 (105.1) |
| Mean daily maximum °C (°F) | −1.1 (30.0) | −0.1 (31.8) | 5.1 (41.2) | 12.6 (54.7) | 19.9 (67.8) | 25.2 (77.4) | 27.5 (81.5) | 26.3 (79.3) | 22.4 (72.3) | 15.0 (59.0) | 8.0 (46.4) | 1.9 (35.4) | 13.6 (56.5) |
| Daily mean °C (°F) | −5.0 (23.0) | −4.5 (23.9) | 0.3 (32.5) | 6.8 (44.2) | 13.6 (56.5) | 19.0 (66.2) | 21.2 (70.2) | 20.1 (68.2) | 16.4 (61.5) | 10.0 (50.0) | 3.9 (39.0) | −1.7 (28.9) | 8.4 (47.1) |
| Mean daily minimum °C (°F) | −8.9 (16.0) | −8.8 (16.2) | −4.4 (24.1) | 1.1 (34.0) | 7.2 (45.0) | 12.8 (55.0) | 14.9 (58.8) | 14.0 (57.2) | 10.3 (50.5) | 4.9 (40.8) | −0.2 (31.6) | −5.0 (23.0) | 3.2 (37.8) |
| Record low °C (°F) | −33.9 (−29.0) | −34.1 (−29.4) | −25.9 (−14.6) | −15.0 (5.0) | −6.1 (21.0) | −1.7 (28.9) | 3.3 (37.9) | −0.6 (30.9) | −3.9 (25.0) | −9.4 (15.1) | −18.9 (−2.0) | −28.0 (−18.4) | −34.1 (−29.4) |
| Average precipitation mm (inches) | 69.7 (2.74) | 62.7 (2.47) | 69.3 (2.73) | 86.6 (3.41) | 88.9 (3.50) | 88.8 (3.50) | 96.6 (3.80) | 83.6 (3.29) | 99.2 (3.91) | 88.3 (3.48) | 110.5 (4.35) | 91.6 (3.61) | 1,035.8 (40.78) |
| Average rainfall mm (inches) | 39.3 (1.55) | 30.8 (1.21) | 48.4 (1.91) | 80.8 (3.18) | 88.9 (3.50) | 88.8 (3.50) | 96.6 (3.80) | 83.6 (3.29) | 99.2 (3.91) | 87.5 (3.44) | 102.8 (4.05) | 59.9 (2.36) | 906.4 (35.69) |
| Average snowfall cm (inches) | 30.4 (12.0) | 31.9 (12.6) | 21.0 (8.3) | 5.8 (2.3) | 0.1 (0.0) | 0.0 (0.0) | 0.0 (0.0) | 0.0 (0.0) | 0.0 (0.0) | 0.8 (0.3) | 7.7 (3.0) | 31.8 (12.5) | 129.5 (51.0) |
| Average precipitation days (≥ 0.2 mm) | 14.6 | 12.2 | 11.7 | 13.6 | 12.4 | 10.3 | 10.8 | 9.5 | 11.8 | 12.4 | 14.9 | 14.2 | 148.3 |
| Average rainy days (≥ 0.2 mm) | 4.7 | 4.4 | 7.8 | 12.6 | 12.4 | 10.3 | 10.8 | 9.5 | 11.8 | 12.3 | 12.7 | 7.8 | 116.9 |
| Average snowy days (≥ 0.2 cm) | 10.3 | 8.9 | 4.9 | 1.4 | 0.06 | 0.0 | 0.0 | 0.0 | 0.0 | 0.19 | 2.3 | 8.0 | 36.1 |
| Mean monthly sunshine hours | 79.0 | 92.8 | 138.1 | 185.6 | 246.5 | 285.9 | 291.5 | 251.9 | 172.9 | 131.6 | 83.1 | 55.0 | 2,013.9 |
| Percentage possible sunshine | 27.1 | 31.3 | 37.4 | 46.3 | 54.4 | 62.4 | 62.7 | 58.4 | 46.0 | 38.3 | 28.3 | 19.5 | 42.7 |
Source: Environment Canada

Climate data for Simcoe (Norfolk County)
| Month | Jan | Feb | Mar | Apr | May | Jun | Jul | Aug | Sep | Oct | Nov | Dec | Year |
|---|---|---|---|---|---|---|---|---|---|---|---|---|---|
| Record high °C (°F) | 13.9 (57.0) | 15.0 (59.0) | 23.9 (75.0) | 29.0 (84.2) | 33.3 (91.9) | 35.6 (96.1) | 35.6 (96.1) | 36.1 (97.0) | 34.4 (93.9) | 27.8 (82.0) | 21.0 (69.8) | 20.0 (68.0) | 36.1 (97.0) |
| Mean daily maximum °C (°F) | −2.4 (27.7) | −1.5 (29.3) | 4.0 (39.2) | 11.9 (53.4) | 18.5 (65.3) | 23.7 (74.7) | 26.3 (79.3) | 25.2 (77.4) | 21.0 (69.8) | 14.5 (58.1) | 7.6 (45.7) | 0.9 (33.6) | 12.5 (54.5) |
| Daily mean °C (°F) | −6.2 (20.8) | −5.6 (21.9) | −0.2 (31.6) | 6.5 (43.7) | 12.6 (54.7) | 17.8 (64.0) | 20.4 (68.7) | 19.5 (67.1) | 15.5 (59.9) | 9.6 (49.3) | 3.8 (38.8) | −2.8 (27.0) | 7.5 (45.5) |
| Mean daily minimum °C (°F) | −10.2 (13.6) | −9.8 (14.4) | −4.5 (23.9) | 1.1 (34.0) | 6.7 (44.1) | 11.9 (53.4) | 14.5 (58.1) | 13.8 (56.8) | 10.0 (50.0) | 4.6 (40.3) | 0.0 (32.0) | −6.6 (20.1) | 2.6 (36.7) |
| Record low °C (°F) | −29.4 (−20.9) | −26.7 (−16.1) | −23.9 (−11.0) | −13.2 (8.2) | −3.9 (25.0) | −0.6 (30.9) | 5.0 (41.0) | 2.0 (35.6) | −3.3 (26.1) | −7.2 (19.0) | −13.0 (8.6) | −23.3 (−9.9) | −29.4 (−20.9) |
| Average precipitation mm (inches) | 63.2 (2.49) | 58.3 (2.30) | 82.1 (3.23) | 83.4 (3.28) | 73.8 (2.91) | 81.6 (3.21) | 76.7 (3.02) | 80.1 (3.15) | 88.8 (3.50) | 73.2 (2.88) | 95.0 (3.74) | 92.2 (3.63) | 948.3 (37.33) |
| Average rainfall mm (inches) | 29.6 (1.17) | 27.4 (1.08) | 61.3 (2.41) | 76.0 (2.99) | 73.6 (2.90) | 81.6 (3.21) | 76.7 (3.02) | 80.1 (3.15) | 88.8 (3.50) | 72.0 (2.83) | 80.4 (3.17) | 55.0 (2.17) | 802.3 (31.59) |
| Average snowfall cm (inches) | 40.4 (15.9) | 34.6 (13.6) | 22.9 (9.0) | 7.8 (3.1) | 0.2 (0.1) | 0 (0) | 0 (0) | 0 (0) | 0 (0) | 1.2 (0.5) | 15.1 (5.9) | 43.3 (17.0) | 165.6 (65.2) |
| Average precipitation days (≥ 0.2 mm) | 17 | 14 | 15 | 12 | 12 | 10 | 9 | 10 | 10 | 12 | 14 | 18 | 154 |
| Average rainy days (≥ 0.2 mm) | 5 | 4 | 9 | 11 | 11 | 10 | 9 | 10 | 10 | 11 | 11 | 8 | 110 |
| Average snowy days (≥ 0.2 cm) | 15 | 12 | 9 | 3 | 0 | 0 | 0 | 0 | 0 | 1 | 5 | 13 | 57 |
Source: Environment Canada

== Communities ==
Norfolk County's main town is Simcoe, which hosts city council and generally serves as the administrative centre. Port Dover, Delhi and Waterford are the other population centres in Norfolk County. Langton and Port Rowan are the largest communities in the western side of the county.

As the population is mainly rural, smaller communities generally predominate along highway intersections.

== Tourism and attractions ==
Norfolk County's primary tourist attractions are the ports, towns and villages along Lake Erie, which the municipality promotes as Ontario's Garden. These towns include Port Dover, Turkey Point and Long Point. Fishing is another key attraction for tourist, as well as birding, hiking, camping and cycling. Main festivals include the Norfolk County Fair & Horse Show (October), Waterford Pumpkin Festival (October), the Friday the 13th motorcycle rally at Port Dover, and Simcoe Christmas Panorama (December). Agri-tourism is another expanding attraction for tourists coming to Norfolk County, with a few wineries in development and numerous farmgate retailers. Wilsonville’s Whistling Gardens, in the northeast Norfolk County, is Ontario’s newest publicly accessible botanical garden and one of the few that are privately run in Canada. In 2014, it was named one of Norfolk’s Top 10 Amazing Places on a social mapping tool created by Ontario’s UNESCO Biosphere Reserves.

=== Culture ===
The Norfolk County Public Library has branches in Delhi, Port Dover, Port Rowan, Simcoe and Waterford. The Simcoe branch, an Ontario Historic Site, was created in 1884 on Peel Street after a mechanics' institute was closed and its property donated for the creation of a free public library. The original building was used until 1912, when it was replaced with a new library building constructed as one of the Carnegie libraries.

The Lighthouse Festival Theatre Company has produced live theatre at Port Dover's old town hall (under the clock tower) since 1981. The Theatre is open year-round and provides a variety of events, including concerts, public meetings, community fund raisers, dance recitals, workshops, band rehearsals and classes. Annually, more than 36000 people now attend events at Lighthouse Theatre.

Waterford's Old Town Hall is home to many local theatre productions. This restored historic building, built in 1902, includes an auditorium with stage, seating for 180, and provides cultural diversity to the community in its capacity as a venue for musical, artistic and theatrical productions, a meeting hall and rental facility.

More recently, the South Coast Jazz festival has attracted thousands of visitors to the region, featuring since its 2014 inception such artists as Holly Cole, David Sanborn, Oakland Stroke, and Toronto's Shuffle Demons.

=== Museums ===
==== Port Dover Harbour Museum ====
The Port Dover Harbour Museum, housed in an original fisherman's net shanty, commemorates Port Dover's fishing industry. The galleries present exhibits on the days of commercial sail as well as Lake Erie shipwrecks, ship building, Long Point, the War of 1812 and other aspects of lakeside life in this community. The museum is also active in the preservation and presentation of local folklore and living traditions, particularly in the areas of fishing and lakeside history. Since 2002, the museum has been the home to a collection of artifacts from the 1852 wreck of the steamer Atlantic. One notable exhibit commemorated the bicentennial of the burning of Dover Mills, a hamlet burned to the ground by American soldiers in 1814. The Town of Port Dover was later established when the harbour at the mouth of the Lynn River was dredged.

==== Waterford Heritage & Agricultural Museum ====
The Waterford Heritage & Agricultural Museum is located in Waterford's best known industrial landmarks "The Pickle Factory". The museum exhibits the social, industrial, and agricultural history of the area through the use of interactive and engaging exhibits.

==== Norfolk County Archives ====
The Norfolk County Archives is housed at the former Eva Brook Donly Museum, a Victorian-period historic house museum that featured displays of local history since it first opened in 1946. Located in downtown Simcoe and operated by Norfolk County, the museum was renowned for its collections of artwork by the late William Edgar Cantelon and Eva Brook Donly. The museum has always had an extensive archival collection of local genealogical historical material, including photographs, diaries, wills, legal papers, obituaries, maps and more. The archival collection is now a part of Norfolk County Archives. Norfolk County established their municipal archives there in 2018 and the collection has grown to include the corporate records for the County, including Council meeting minutes, by-laws, assessment rolls, vital statistics and other County administrative records.

==== Teeterville Pioneer Museum ====
The Teeterville Pioneer Museum is a museum devoted to pioneer life in the 19th century. It includes antique farm equipment as well as home and garden tools.

==== Delhi Tobacco Museum and Heritage Centre ====
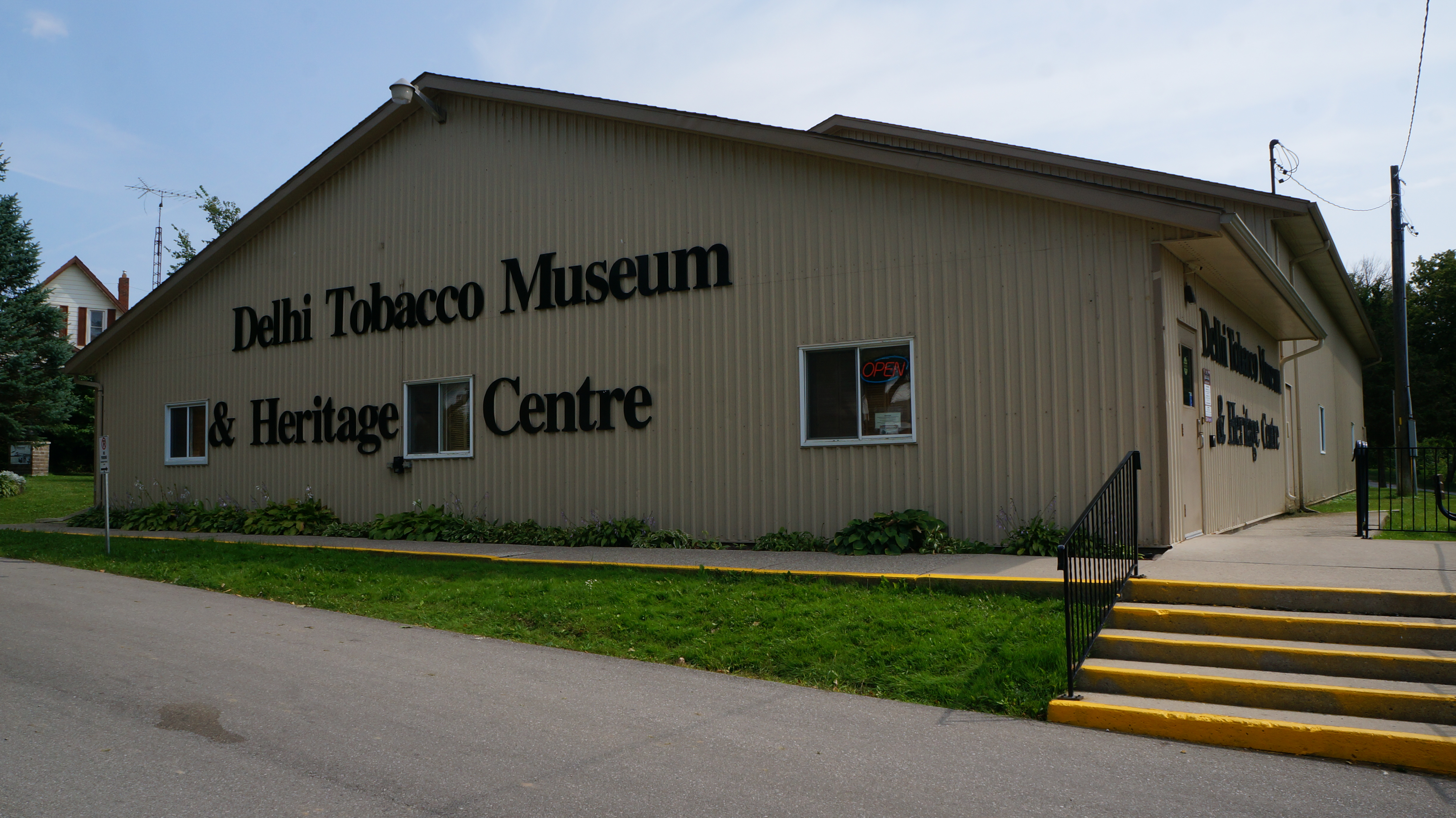
Delhi Tobacco Museum & Heritage Centre

The Delhi Tobacco Museum and Heritage Centre displays the agricultural and cultural history of the former township. Despite a province-wide smoking ban, the museum still guarantees its patrons the benefits of viewing the artistry and science of tobacco farming during the Golden Years of growing tobacco. It is located near Quances Dam. There is also a park nearby that is enjoyed by the local residents for picnics, barbecues, and for walking around with. It is closed on Sundays and major holidays.

==== Backus Mill Heritage and Conservation Centre ====
The Backus Mill Heritage and Conservation Centre, an open-air museum featuring a historic grist mill and a nature centre, is a National Historic Site.

==== Norfolk Arts Centre at Lynnwood National Historic Site ====
Housed in the Lynnwood National Historic Site, the Norfolk Arts Centre is Norfolk County’s public art gallery. The Norfolk Arts Centre has regularly changing exhibits featuring local and regional artists, diverse arts programs and special events.

=== Festivities ===
Port Dover is the location of a biker rally which takes place every Friday the 13th. Simcoe is well-known for annual community events including the Lynn River Music and Arts Festival, as well as the Simcoe Panorama. Port Rowan also hosts an annual Bayfest.

The Norfolk County Fairgrounds are home to the Norfolk Wildlife and Adventure Show, Eat & Drink Norfolk and the Norfolk County Fair and Horse Show, Canada's largest County Fair, that is held every Thanksgiving weekend in October. In addition to traditional agricultural and arts competitions, it features major grandstand shows that include Demo Derbys, Monster Trucks, Tractor Pulls and sold out concerts with artists Big n Rich, Barenaked Ladies, Burton Cummings, Dallas Smith and Carly Rae Jepsen.

Every October, Waterford hosts a Pumpkin Festival close to the end of the month. The Waterford Lions and Lioness clubs have been organizing the event since 2009. Due to low funding, the fireworks are no longer an event at the Waterford Pumpkin Festival. The usual features of the Pumpkin Festival are a pyramid of 1500 pumpkins, decorated buildings, craft shows, an automobile show, a carnival, live entertainment, and the locally famous Pumpkinbowl football game at Waterford District High School.

The Donnybrook Fair in Walsh is an annual two-day event. The fair has been held every year from 1857 until the present, making 2007 the 150th Fair. This mid-September event involves the children of Walsh Public School and St. Michael's School entering projects and many agricultural commodities, grown locally, for prize money and ribbons. More than $1200 was paid to the elementary children in 2006. The fair has grown every year with the help of many volunteers. Fundraising events are held all year to finance the fair. These events include an annual barbecue dance, a Victoria Day brunch, food booths at every "Friday the 13th" event in Port Dover, and numerous raffles. The most popular event at each fair is the demolition derby. These were sponsored for a long time by the Horsepower Unlimited Car Club from Simcoe but are now sponsored by the Vittoria & St. Williams Fire Department Auxiliaries. 2007 was considered to be the 34th consecutive year of the demolition derbies.

Throughout the year, the fairgrounds and the Community Centre Hall are frequently used for weddings, funerals, and buck and doe events. The name "Donnybrook Fair" comes from an early settler of Walsh, who said the fair reminded him of an annual horse fair in Donnybrook, Dublin, Ireland.

=== Gentlemen of the Road ===
In August 2013, Mumford & Sons hosted a 4-day stopover of their travelling music festival, called Gentlemen of the Road, in Norfolk County. It took place in the Norfolk County Fairgrounds, and was called the Gentlemen of the Road Simcoe Stopover. 35,000 festival-goers attended the festival, as well as many out-of-town resources for the event production. The aim of this tour was to be an economic stimulus for small towns in various parts of the world, where their festival stopovers occurred. The band encouraged festival goers to spend their money locally at each stopover. Simcoe and Norfolk were no different, where the tour was estimated to attract as much as $10 million in tourism revenues.

=== Boating ===
Norfolk County is also known for its attraction to boaters and fishers. The small village in Norfolk County, Turkey Point, is known for having the largest freshwater marina in Canada, MacDonald Turkey Point Marina. All summer long, thousands travel from Turkey Point to Pottahawk Point to party. A thriving boating scene can be found in Port Rowan; where alcoholic beverages can frequently be found on the docks and consumed by boaters over the age of majority. They must be purchased inland either through a local bar or through the government-owned beer store.

== Sports ==
The Norfolk HERicanes ices house league teams in the Greater Hamilton Girls Hockey League and has its rep teams playing in the Lower Lakes Female Hockey League. The HERicanes play out of Talbot Gardens and Simcoe Rec Centre in Simcoe, Port Dover Arena, Waterford Arena and Delhi Arena.

Norfolk has three Junior C level hockey teams. The Port Dover Sailors and Delhi Travellers play in the Provincial Junior Hockey League. While the Simcoe Shamrocks once played in Norfolk County, they moved to Hespeler in 2018 because of arena issues.

The Norfolk Minor Hockey Association (Norfolk Knights) is a REP Partnership between Port Dover, Simcoe, and Waterford Minor Hockey Associations. Teams compete at the Junior B/BB level.

The Norfolk Harvesters RFC of the Niagara Rugby Union are a rugby football club that operates men's, women's, u18 boys' and u18 girls' rugby teams. The Club was established in 2001 and has won division championships in 2003, 2004, 2007, 2014, and a four-year run of championships in the "B" Division from 2015 to 2018. The club's current home is the rugby pitch at Waterford's Hellyer Memorial Park. Players and coaches have gone on to represent the Niagara Rugby Union, Rugby Ontario, and at the national level with Rugby Canada.

== Education ==
Public schools in Norfolk County are administered by the Grand Erie District School Board. The board maintains 16 public elementary schools and five public high schools in Norfolk:

- Boston Public School
- Courtland Public School
- Delhi Public School
- Doverwood Public School
- Elgin Avenue Public School
- Houghton Public School
- Langton Public School
- Lynndale Heights Public School
- Port Rowan Public School
- Teeterville Public School
- Walsh Public School
- Waterford Public School
- West Lynn Public School
- Windham Central Public School-no longer open
- Simcoe Composite School
- Delhi District Secondary School
- Port Dover Composite School (now Lakewood Elementary)
- Valley Heights Secondary School
- Waterford District High School

=== Separate schools ===
Separate schools are administered by the Brant Haldimand Norfolk Catholic District School Board, which maintains seven elementary schools and one high school.

- Our Lady of Fatima Catholic School
- Sacred Heart Catholic School
- St. Mary's catholic school
- St. Cecilia's Catholic School
- St. Frances Cabrini Catholic School
- St. Joseph's Catholic School
- St. Michael's Catholic School
- Holy Trinity Catholic High School

The Brant Haldimand Norfolk Catholic District School Board also administers the on-site secondary school of the Sprucedale Youth Centre, a secure detention facility for young offenders.

There is also a separate school administered by the Conseil scolaire catholique Mon Avenir

- École Élémentaire Catholique Sainte-Marie in the former building of the St. Mary's Catholic Elementary School and Laval 65, the predecessor to the school. Conseil scolaire catholique de district centre sud's board name was changed to Conseil scolaire catholique Mon Avenir on May 10, 2017.

== Media ==
=== Featuring Norfolk ===
In 2004 the documentary film Tobacco's Last Stand was released which highlighted the effect on tobacco production on the region.

=== Radio ===
Simcoe has its own radio station, CHCD-FM. The area is otherwise served by media in Erie (Pennsylvania), Cleveland (Ohio), Buffalo (New York), and some radio stations from Toronto are also often receivable.

=== Newspapers ===
- Norfolk and Tillsonburg News
- Port Dover Maple Leaf
- Port Rowan Good News
- Simcoe Reformer
- Simcoe Advocate

== Notable people ==
- Jacob R. Beamer, Patriot
- Shane Bergman, Canadian football player
- Rob Blake, NHL hockey player, former team captain, Olympic Gold Medalist, Stanley Cup Champion, Hockey Hall of Fame inductee
- Annaleise Carr, swimmer
- Jassen Cullimore, NHL hockey player, Stanley Cup Champion
- Rick Danko, musician from The Band
- Terry Danko, musician
- Nelson Emerson, NHL hockey player
- Red Kelly, Hockey Hall of Fame inductee
- Joey Muha, drummer/musician
- Jack Roxburgh, politician and president of the Canadian Amateur Hockey Association
- Dwayne Roloson, NHL hockey player
- Rick Wamsley, NHL hockey player
- William Legh Walsh

== Demographics ==
In the 2021 Census of Population conducted by Statistics Canada, Norfolk County had a population of 67,490 living in 27,594 of its 30,085 total private dwellings, a change of 5.4% from its 2016 population of 64,044. With a land area of 1,597.68 km^{2} (616.87 sq mi), it had a population density of 42.2/km^{2} (109.4/sq mi) in 2021.

Historical populations Norfolk County, ON
| Year | Pop. | ±% |
|---|---|---|
| 1996 | 60,534 | — |
| 2001 | 60,847 | +0.5% |
| 2006 | 62,563 | +2.8% |
| 2011 | 63,175 | +1.0% |
| 2016 | 64,044 | +1.4% |
| 2021 | 67,490 | +5.4% |

Canada census – Norfolk County community profile

| | 2021 | 2016 | 2011 |
| Population | 67,490 (+5.4% from 2016) | 64,044 (+1.4% from 2011) | 63,175 (+1.0% from 2006) |
| Land area | 1,597.68 km^{2} (616.87 sq mi) | 1,607.55 km^{2} (620.68 sq mi) | 1,607.60 km^{2} (620.70 sq mi) |
| Population density | 42.2/km^{2} (109/sq mi) | 39.8/km^{2} (103/sq mi) | 39.3/km^{2} (102/sq mi) |
| Median age | 48.8 (M: 47.2, F: 50.4) | 47.9 (M: 46.8, F: 49.0) |
| Private dwellings | 27,595 (total) | 28,720 (total) | 27,814 (total) |
| Median household income | | $$67,338 |

References: 2021 2016 2011

According to Statistics Canada 2016 census:

- Median income of persons of age 15 or older: C$32,301
- Average earnings of all persons with earnings: C$40,045
- Racial Profile:
  - 95.4% White
  - 2.8% Aboriginal
  - 0.9% Black
  - 0.9% Asian

Panethnic groups in Norfolk County (2001−2021)
| Panethnic group | 2021 | | 2016 | | 2011 | | 2006 | | 2001 | |
| Panethnic group | Pop. | % | Pop. | % | Pop. | % | Pop. | % | Pop. | % |
|---|---|---|---|---|---|---|---|---|---|---|
| European (Note: Statistic includes all persons that did not make up part of a visible minority or an indigenous identity.) | 61,880 | 93.44% | 59,240 | 94.9% | 58,400 | 95.18% | 59,680 | 96.48% | 58,010 | 96.76% |
| Indigenous | 2,120 | 3.2% | 1,795 | 2.88% | 1,945 | 3.17% | 1,150 | 1.86% | 950 | 1.58% |
| African | 650 | 0.98% | 575 | 0.92% | 370 | 0.6% | 405 | 0.65% | 405 | 0.68% |
| Southeast Asian (Note: Statistic includes total responses of "Filipino" and "Southeast Asian" under visible minority section on census.) | 370 | 0.56% | 225 | 0.36% | 130 | 0.21% | 60 | 0.1% | 50 | 0.08% |
| South Asian | 345 | 0.52% | 115 | 0.18% | 100 | 0.16% | 80 | 0.13% | 115 | 0.19% |
| East Asian (Note: Statistic includes total responses of "Chinese", "Korean", and "Japanese" under visible minority section on census.) | 335 | 0.51% | 250 | 0.4% | 190 | 0.31% | 295 | 0.48% | 185 | 0.31% |
| Latin American | 245 | 0.37% | 95 | 0.15% | 60 | 0.1% | 125 | 0.2% | 100 | 0.17% |
| Middle Eastern (Note: Statistic includes total responses of "West Asian" and "Arab" under visible minority section on census.) | 80 | 0.12% | 40 | 0.06% | 0 | 0% | 25 | 0.04% | 40 | 0.07% |
| Other (Note: Statistic includes total responses of "Visible minority, n.i.e." and "Multiple visible minorities" under visible minority section on census.) | 200 | 0.3% | 95 | 0.15% | 125 | 0.2% | 30 | 0.05% | 110 | 0.18% |
| Total responses | 66,225 | 98.13% | 62,425 | 97.47% | 61,360 | 97.13% | 61,860 | 98.88% | 59,950 | 98.53% |
| Total population | 67,490 | 100% | 64,044 | 100% | 63,175 | 100% | 62,563 | 100% | 60,847 | 100% |
Note: Totals greater than 100% due to multiple origin responses

== See also ==
- List of townships in Ontario

== Bibliography ==
- Lore and Legends of Long Point, Harry B. Barrett, Burns and MacEachearn 1977, ISBN 978-0-88768-075-5
- Long Point: Last Port of Call, David Stone, Boston Mills Press, 1988, ISBN 978-0-919783-59-1
- Waters of Repose, Dave Stone and David Frew, Erie County Historical Society 1993, ISBN 1-883658-19-5
