= Fatima (given name) =

Fatima فَاطِمَة
- Pronunciation: Arabic: [faː.tˤi.mah]
- Gender: Female

Origin
- Origin: Arabic
- Meaning: one who abstains

Other names
- Related names: Fathima, Fatimah, Fadumo, Fadime, Fadima, Fatma, Fatme, Fatemeh, Fathama, Fadma, Fatna, Fatim, Fotima, Patimat, Petimat

Fatima (Arabic: فَاطِمَة, Fāṭimah), also spelled Fatimah, is a female given name of Arabic origin used throughout the Muslim world. Several relatives of the Islamic prophet Muhammad had the name, including, most famously, his daughter Fatimah bint Muhammad. The literal meaning of the name is one who separates or one who abstains. It is used in the context of "separating people from Hell" "being separated from Hell" "weaning from the punishment of Hell" "separating good from evil" or "being separated from evil," so it is also considered to mean "one who splits from Hell."

The name "Fatimah" is derived from the infinitive "F-Ṭ-M" (Arabic: ف-ط-م) meaning "to separate, to cut something from another." Several reasons have been mentioned for naming Fatimah daughter of Muhammed with this name including the narration, in which her father said said, "God named her Fatimah, because He separated and kept her and her lovers (and in another tradition: "her followers") away from fire." It is narrated from Imam Jafar al-Sadiq that, "she was named Fatima because she was kept away from evil."

The colloquial Arabic pronunciation of the name in some varieties (e.g., Levantine and Egyptian) often omits the unstressed second syllable and renders it as Fatma when romanized. Incidentally, this is also the usual Turkish form of the name (another variant, Fadime, is less common). In South Asian countries, such as India (most commonly), Pakistan, it may be spelt as Fathima. In Persian, the name is rendered as Fatemeh in the Iranian dialect, Fatima Afghan dialect, Fatimə (pronounced Fátimeh) in Azerbaijani, and Fotima (Фотима) in Tajik dialect.

Many other names and titles have also been given to Fatimah such as Zahra (luminous; radiant), Batul (cut off: ascetic), Zahida (ascetic), Norea (girl of light), Aludra (the chaste), Adara (chaste), Hurra (free), Hawra Insiya (human in nymph form), Shahida (martyred), Siddiqa (truthful), Raqiya (girl who casts incantation) Abeda (girl who worships), Karima (generous) and Jemila (beautiful). Other examples of commonly and rarely known names of Fatimah include Muhammedah, Saphiya, Walia (Valia), Hania, Mutahara, Sharifa, Hakima, Qanita, Umm Abiha, and Daphia.

Imam Sadiq says in a narration: "Fatima means someone who is torn off from all evil and ugliness." Imam Reza also quotes the Prophet Muhammed as saying: "For this reason, I named my daughter Fatimah because God has kept her and her friends away from the fire of hell."

Fatima is also used by non-Muslims: the town of Fátima, Portugal (originally named after an Arab princess) was the site of a famous Marian apparition in 1917, after which it achieved some popularity as a female personal name among Catholic populations, particularly in the Portuguese-speaking and Spanish-speaking countries.

== Variations ==
This name has many variations in different languages. The Turkish and Azerbaijani transliteration of the name is either Fatma or Fatimeh. In Somali the name became Fadumo. It is Faḍma in Kabyle. In South Asia, it is spelt Fathima. Spelled as Fátima, the name is also common amongst Spanish and especially Portuguese speaking peoples in Iberia as well as in the Americas. Due to the Berber influence on Moroccan Arabic, other variations exist in Morocco, such as Fatna, Fadma, Fettoosh, Fattoom.

=== Fatimah ===
- Fatima, also called "Fatima Zahra" ("Fatima the shining one"), daughter of Muhammad
- Fatima bint Abd al-Malik, the wife of caliph Umar ibn Abd al-Aziz
- Fatimah Abdullah, Malaysian politician
- Fāṭimah al-Baqqālī, Emirati calligrapher, decorator, and visual artist
- Fatma Omar An-Najar, Palestinian suicide bomber
- Fatimah Baeshen, Saudi Arabian government official
- Fatimah Baraghani, better known as Táhirih, influential poet and theologian of the Bábí faith in Iran
- Fatimah bint Amr, grandmother of Muhammad
- Fatimah bint Asad (568 CE - 626 CE), Muhammad's aunt, the mother of fourth Rashidun ('rightly guided') caliph Ali bin Abu Talib, and the mother-in-law of Muhammad's daughter, Fatima Zahra
- Fatimah bint Husayn, daughter of Husayn bin Ali
- Fatimah bint Hizam, the second wife of Ali, cousin of Muhammad
- Fatimah bint al-Khattab, sister of Caliph Umar ibn al-Khattab and an early follower of Muhammad
- Fatimah bint Muhammad al-Taymi, wife of al-Mansur (r. 754–775) and mother of prince Sulayman
- Fatimah bint Harun al-Rashid, daughter of Caliph Harun al-Rashid and wife of Ja'far ibn Musa al-Hadi
- Fatimah bint Musa, daughter of Musa al-Kadhim and sister of Ali al-Ridha, two of the Twelve Imams
- Fatimah bint al-Fath ibn Khaqan, also known as Fatimah Khatun bint al-Fath, spouse of Abbasid caliph Al-Mu'tazz (r. 866–869), daughter of Abbasid official al-Fath ibn Khaqan
- Fatimah binte Sulaiman, Singaporean merchant and philanthropist
- Fatimah el-Sharif (1911–2009), queen consort of Libya
- Fatimah Khatun, was the wife of Caliph al-Muqtafi (r. 1136–1160)
- Fatimah Busu, Malaysian novelist, short-story writer, and academic
- Fatimah Hashim (1924 - 2010), Malaysian cabinet minister
- Fatimah Jackson, American biologist and anthropologist
- Fatimah Lateef (born 1966), Singaporean medical professor and politician
- Fatimah Mansour (born 2007), Saudi footballer
- Fatimah Rohani binti Ismail, known professionally as Emma Maembong, a Malaysian actress and model
- Sayyida Fatimah el-Sharif (1911–2009), queen consort of King Idris of the Kingdom of Libya
- Fatimah Tuggar (born 1967), Nigerian multimedia artist

=== Fátima ===
- Fátima Aburto Baselga (born 1949) Spanish physician and politician
- Fátima Acuña (born 1999) Paraguayan handball player
- Fátima Albuquerque, Mozambican journalist
- Fátima Báñez (born 1967), Spanish politician, economist and jurist
- Fátima Barone (born 1999), Uruguayan footballer
- Fátima Bernardes (born 1962), Brazilian journalist
- Fátima Bezerra (born 1955), Brazilian politician
- Fátima Blázquez (born 1975), Spanish cyclist
- Fátima Bosch (born 2000), Mexican actress and model, and Miss Universe 2025
- Fátima Campos Ferreira (born 1958), Portuguese television presenter and journalist
- Fátima Canuto (born 1958), Brazilian lawyer, economist and politician
- Fátima Carneiro (born 1954), Portuguese anatomical pathologist and cancer researcher
- Fátima Choi, politician in Macau
- Fátima Diame, Spanish athlete
- Fátima Djarra Sani (born 1968), Guinea-Bissau feminist activist, particularly against female genital mutilation
- Fátima Felgueiras (born 1954), Portuguese politician
- Fátima Fernández Cano (born 1995), Spanish professional golfer
- Fátima Ferreira (born 1959), Austrian biochemist
- Fátima Flórez (born 1978), former domestic partner of Javier Milei
- Fatima Gallardo, Spanish swimmer
- Fátima Gálvez, Spanish sport shooter
- Fátima Gómez Montero, Mexican politician
- Fátima Guedes, Brazilian singer and composer
- Fátima Leyva (born 1980), Mexican footballer
- Fátima Lopes (born 1965), Portuguese fashion designer
- Fátima Madrid (born 1979), Spanish swimmer
- Fátima Mereles ( (born 1953) Paraguayan botanist
- Fátima Miranda, Spanish singer and researcher
- Fátima Molina (born 1986), Mexican actress
- Fátima Montaño (born 1984), Colombian footballer
- Fátima Moreira de Melo, Dutch field hockey player
- Fátima Pinto (born 1996), Portuguese footballer
- Fátima Ptacek (born 2000), American child actress and model
- Fátima Rodríguez (born 1961), Spanish writer, translator, professor
- Fátima Silva (born 1970), Portuguese long-distance runner
- Fátima Soares, Venezuelan politician
- Fátima Veiga (born 1957), Cape Verdean politician and diplomat

=== Fatema ===
- Fatema Al Harbi (born 1991 or 1992), Bahraini author, and peace activist

=== Fatemeh ===
- Fatemeh Abdi Galangashi (better known as Nooshafarin), Iranian singer
- Fatemeh Adeli, Iranian footballer
- Fatemeh Ajorlou, Iranian politician
- Fatemeh Alia, Iranian politician
- Fatemah Alzelzela, Kuwaiti electrical engineer and environmental advocate
- Fatemeh Amineh, Iranian footballer
- Fatemeh Amini, female religious leader of Iran
- Fateme Asadi (1960–1984), first Iranian 'martyr' woman whose body was found during post-war explorations
- Fatemeh Behboudi, Iranian photojournalist and documentary photographer
- Fatemeh Bodaghi, Iranian politician
- Fatemeh Daneshvar, Iranian businesswoman, entrepreneur and reformist politician
- Fatemeh Daqaq, Iranian Muslim narrator, Quran-ologist and Sufi
- Fatemeh Dehghani, Iranian barbat and oud player
- Fateme Ekhtesari, Iranian poet
- Fatemeh Emdadian, Iranian sculptor
- Fatemeh Geraeli, Iranian footballer
- Fatemeh Ghafouri Morad, Iranian darts player
- Fatemeh Ghasemi, Iranian footballer
- Fatemeh Goudarzi, Iranian actress
- Fatemeh Haghighatjoo, former parliament deputy, member of opposition party based in US, Cambridge, Massachusetts
- Fatemeh Hamami, Iranian foot-and-mouth painter
- Fatemeh Hashemi, Iranian actress
- Fatemeh Hashemi Rafsanjani, Iranian politician
- Fatemeh Heidari, Iranian wushu practitioner
- Fatemeh Hemmati (born 2003), Iranian Paralympic archer
- Fatemeh Hosseini, Iranian politician
- Fatemeh Jamalifar, Iranian table tennis player
- Fatemeh Javadi, conservative politician and Vice President of Iran
- Fatemeh Karamzadeh, Iranian sport shooter
- Fatemeh Keshavarz, Iranian academic, scholar and poet
- Fatemeh Khalili, Iranian handball player
- Fatemeh Moghimi, Iranian engineer, entrepreneur and political activist
- Fatemeh Mojallal, Iranian rower athlete
- Fatemeh Moosavi, Iranian film director, photographer and scriptwriter
- Fatemeh Motamed-Arya, Iranian actress
- Fatemeh Naghavi, Iranian actress
- Fatemeh Pahlavi, Iranian royal
- Fatemeh Rahbar, Iranian politician
- Fatemeh Rakeei, Iranian politician
- Fatemeh Rouhani, Iranian taekwondo practitioner
- Fatemeh Sadeghi, Iranian karateka
- Fatemeh Saeidi, Iranian educator and reformist politician
- Fatemeh Sepehri, Iranian activist
- Fatemeh Shams, Persian contemporary poet, literary scholar and translator
- Fatemeh Sharif, Iranian futsal player and coach
- Fatemeh Shayan, Iranian political scientist
- Fatemeh Sohrabi, Iranian footballer

=== Fathima ===
- Fathima Babu, Indian actress
- Fathima Beevi (1927–2023), former judge of the Supreme Court of India

=== Fatimeh ===
- Princess Fatimeh Pahlavi (1928–1987), Iranian princess

=== Fatima ===
- Fatima al-Fihriya (c. 800–880), Founder of the world's oldest university University of al-Qarawiyyin
- Fatima al-Budeiri (1923–2009), Palestinian radio broadcaster
- Fatima al-Fudayliya, 19th-century Islamic scholar
- Fatima al-Samarqandi, 12th-century Hanafi Islamic scholar
- Fatima al-Suqutriyya, Yemeni writer and poet
- Princess Lalla Fatima Zohra (1929–2014), Moroccan princess
- Fatima (died 1246), a favorite of Mongol empress Töregene Khatun and cabinet minister
- Fatima bint al-Ahmar (c. 1260–1348), a Nasrid princess in Granada, regents of sultans Muhammad IV and Yusuf I
- Fatima bint al-Khattab, sister of the 2nd caliph Umar ibn al-Khattab
- Fatima bint Abd al-Malik, wife of Umayyad caliph Umar ibn Abd al-Aziz
- Fatima bint Amr, grandmother of Muhammad
- Fatima bint Hasan, daughter of Hasan ibn Ali
- Fatima bint Mohammed Al Balooshi, Bahrani politician
- Fatima bint Mundhir, Hadith scholar from Medina
- Fatima bint Musa, daughter of the Seventh Twelver Imam
- Fatima bint Qays, prominent female companion (Sahabiyah) of the Prophet Muhammad
- Fatima bint Rashid Al Nuaimi, Sheikha of Fujairah
- Fatima Zahra Hafdi, known as La Zarra, Canadian-Moroccan singer
- Fatima Abdel Mahmoud, Sudanese politician
- Fatima Abdullah Al-Mal, Qatari criminal judge
- Fatima Adoum, French actress
- Fatima Aghamirzayeva (born 1953), Azerbaijani business woman
- Fatima Ahmed, Italian-Somali writer
- Fatima Ahmed Ibrahim, Sudanese writer, women's rights activist and socialist leader
- Fatima Akilu, Nigerian psychologist and a public speaker
- Fatima Al-Banawi, Saudi filmmaker and actress
- Fatima Al Qadiri, Kuwaiti musician and conceptual artist
- Fatima Al Zahraa Khachab (born 1999), Lebanese footballer
- Fatima Ali, Pakistani-American chef
- Fatima Alkaramova (born 2002), Azerbaijani swimmer
- Fatima Aouam, Moroccan middle-distance runner
- Fatima Azeez, Nigerian badminton player
- Fatima Aziz, Afghan physician and politician
- Fatima Babiker Mahmoud, Sudanese feminist
- Fatima Baquiran, Filipino painter
- Fatima Bara, Algerian footballer
- Fatima Bashir, Nigerian judoka
- Fatima Batul Mukhtar, Nigerian botanist and academic
- Fatima Bedar, Algerian independence activist
- Fatima Begum (politician, born 1890) (1890–1958), Pakistan Movement politician
- Fatima Begum (member of the Provincial Assembly of the Punjab)
- Fatima Ben Saïdane, Tunisian actress
- Fatima Bernawi, Palestinian militant
- Fatima Besnaci-Lancou, French writer
- Fatima Beyina-Moussa, Congolese business executive
- Fatima Bhutto, niece of the late Benazir Bhutto
- Fatima Bio, First Lady of Sierra Leone
- Fatima Boubekdi, Moroccan filmmaker
- Fatima Boudouani, Algerian army officer
- Fatima Boussora, Algerian handball player
- Fatima Cates (1865–1900), British Muslim convert and activist
- Fatima Chohan, South African politician
- Fatima Cody Stanford, American obesity medicine physician
- Fatima Daas, French-Algerian novelist
- Fatima Dahman, Yemeni sprinter
- Fatima Denton, the Co-ordinator for the African Climate Policy Centre
- Fatima Deryan, Lebanese mountaineer
- Fatima Dhiab, Palestinian author
- Fatima Dike, South African playwright and theatre director
- Fatima Aliah Dimaporo, Filipino politician
- Fatima Djibo Sidikou, Nigerien diplomat
- Fatima D'Souza, Indian actress and singer
- Fatima Ebrahimi, Iranian-American physicist
- Fatima Effendi, Pakistani actress and model
- Fatima El-Faquir, Moroccan sprinter
- Fatima El Allami, Moroccan tennis player
- Fatima El Hayani, Moroccan cyclist
- Fatima Ezzahra El Mansouri, Moroccan politician
- Fatima Ezzahra Gardadi, Moroccan long-distance runner
- Fatima Faloye, American actress
- Fatima Farheen Mirza, American author
- Fatima Gallaire, French-Algerian playwright
- Fatima Grimm, German translator
- Fatima Hadad, Moroccan singer and artistic director
- Fatima Hajaig, South African politician
- Fatima Hamed, politician of Ceuta
- Fatima Hassan, South African human rights lawyer
- Fatima Hernadi, Moroccan actress
- Fatima Houda-Pepin, Canadian politician
- Fatima Ibrahim Shema, former First Lady of Katsina State
- Fatima Jamal, American artist
- Fatima Jebli Ouazzani, Moroccan film director
- Fatima Jibrell, Goldman Environmental Prize-winning Somali environmentalist
- Fatima Jinnah
- Fatima bint Mubarak Al Ketbi
- Fatima Kuinova, Soviet-Bukharan Jewish singer and "Honored Artist of the USSR"
- Fatima Kyari Mohammed, Nigerian diplomat
- Fatima Lamarti (born 1966), Belgian politician
- Fatima Lolo, Nigerian musical artist
- Fatima Manji, English TV journalist and newsreader
- Fatima Marouan, Moroccan politician and physician
- Fatima Massaquoi, Liberian educator
- Fatima Meer, South African writer, academic, screenwriter, and prominent anti-apartheid activist
- Fatima Mohamed Dos Santos, Spanish politician
- Fatima Mohammed Habib, Nigerian social entrepreneur
- Fatima Mokhtari, Algerian artistic gymnast
- Fatima Moreira de Melo, Dutch field hockey player
- Fatima Mujib Bilqees, Pakistani parasitologist and helminthologist
- Fatima Naoot (born 1964), Egyptian poet and journalist
- Fatima Naqvi, American literary and film scholar
- Fatima Payman, Australian politician
- Fatima Rainey, Swedish singer
- Fatima Rama, Papua New Guinean footballer
- Fatima Regragui, Moroccan actress
- Fatima Robinson, American choreographer
- Fatima Rushdi, Egyptian actress
- Fatima Saad, Syrian actress
- Fatima Sacko, Guinean basketball player
- Fatima Sadiqi, Moroccan linguist
- Fatima Sana, Pakistani cricketer
- Fatima Sana Shaikh, Indian actress
- Fatima Seedat, South African feminist, Islamic scholar and women's rights activist
- Fatima Sekouane, Algerian footballer
- Fatima Shah, Pakistani gynaecologist, social worker and educator
- Fatima Shaik, Indian-American writer
- Fatima Sharafeddine, Lebanese writer and editor
- Fatima Sheikh, 19th-century Indian educator's and social reformer
- Fatima Siad, Somali fashion model
- Fatima Djibo Sidikou, Nigerian diplomat
- Fatima Sughra Begum, Pakistan movement activist
- Fatima Surayya Bajia, Pakistani writer
- Fatima Tabaamrant, Moroccan musical artist
- Fatima Tagnaout, Moroccan footballer
- Fatima Tahir, Nigerian academician
- Fatima Talib, Sudanese educator and women's rights activist
- Fatima Tihihit, Moroccan singer
- Fatima Trotta, Italian actress
- Fatima Waziri-Azi, Nigerian pharmacist and professor
- Fatima Whitbread, British former javelin thrower and multiple medal-winner
- Fatima Yasmin, Bangladeshi bureaucrat and vice-president of the Asian Development Bank
- Fatima Yusuf, Nigerian track-and-field athlete
- Fatima Yvelain, French long-distance runner
- Fatima Zahra Bennacer, Moroccan actress
- Fatima Zaidi (born 1989), Canadian entrepreneur
- Fatima Zakaria (1936–2021), Indian journalist
- Fatima Zohra Ardjoune, Algerian army general
- Fatima Zohra Gharbi (born 2001), Moroccan footballer
- Fatima-Zohra Oukazi (born 1984), Algerian volleyball player

=== Fatma ===
- Fatma Abdulhabib Fereji, Tanzanian politician
- Fatma Agrebi, Tunisian volleyball player
- Fatma Ali (born 1950), Tanzanian politician
- Fatma Aliye Topuz (1862–1936), Turkish novelist and columnist
- Fatma Al-Nabhani, Omani tennis player
- Fatma Ali, Tanzanian politician
- Fatma Aly, Egyptian basketball player
- Fatma Atalar (born 1988), Turkish handball player
- Fatma Ay (born 1992), Turkish handball player
- Fatma Aydemir, German author and journalist
- Fatma Begum, film actress and director from India
- Fatma Betül Sayan Kaya, Turkish politician
- Fatma Beyaz, Turkish volleyball player
- Fatma Bouri, Turkish handball player
- Fatma Boussaha, Tunisian Mezwed singer
- Fatma Bucak, Turkish contemporary artist
- Fatma Ceren Necipoğlu (1972–2009), Turkish harpist and university lecture for music
- Fatma Çekiç (born 2003), Turkish karateka
- Fatma Damla Altın (born 2002), Turkish Paralympian athlete
- Fatma Danabaş (born 1983), Turksh para archer
- Fatma Demir, Turkish long-distance runner
- Fatma Ekenoğlu (born 1956), Turkish Cypriot politician
- Fatma El Mehdi, Sahrawi activist
- Fatma El Sharnouby, Egyptian middle-distance runner
- Fatma Gadri, Azerbaijani theatre actress
- Fatma Girik (1942–2022), Turkish actress and politician
- Fatma Gül Güler, Turkish Paralympic goalball player
- Fatma Gül Sakızcan, Turkish handball player
- Fatma Güldemet Sarı, Turkish politician
- Fatma Işık (born 1991), Turkish-German footballer
- Fatma Hikmet İşmen (1918–2006), Turkish agricultural engineer, politician and former senator
- Fatma Işık, Turkish-German footballer
- Fatma Jynge, Norwegian architect and politician
- Fatma Kachroudi, Tunisian Paralympian athlete
- Fatma Kaplan Hürriyet, Turkish politician
- Fatma Kara (born 1991), Turkish footballer
- Fatma Khanum Kamina, Azerbaijani poet
- Fatma Koşer Kaya (born 1968), Dutch politician
- Fatma Kurtulan (born 1964), Turkish politician
- Fatma Lanouar, Tunisian runner
- Fatma Mehraliyeva, Azerbaijani singer and actress
- Fatma Moalla, Tunisian mathematician
- Fatma Mohamed, Romanian actress
- Fatma Moussa, Egyptian academic, translator and literary critic
- Fatma Müge Göçek, Turkish sociologist
- Fatma Mukhtarova (1893–1972), Azerbaijani opera singer
- Fatma Neslişah, paternal granddaughter of the last Ottoman Caliph Abdülmecid II
- Fatma Nur Yavuz, Turkish badminton player
- Fatma Omar, Egyptian powerlifter
- Fatma Özlem Tursun (born 1988), Turkish female football referee and former women's footballer
- Fatma Pesend Hanım Efendi (1876–1924), wife of Ottoman Sultan Abdul Hamid II
- Fatma Rashed, Egyptian rower
- Fatma Şahin (born 1966), Turkish politician
- Fatma Şahin (footballer) (born 1990), Turkish footballer
- Fatma Said, Egyptian singer
- Fatma Salman Kotan (born 1980), Turkish politician
- Fatma Samoura (born 1962), United Nations official from Senegal
- Fatma Serpil Alpman, Turkish diplomat
- Fatma Sfar-Ben-Chker (born 1994), Tunisian handball player
- Fatma Shanan, Israeli painter
- Fatma Songül Gültekin (born 1997), Turkish hockey player and former footballer
- Fatma Sultan, several Ottoman princesses
- Fatma Şakar (born 1994), Turkish-German footballer
- Fatma Thabet (born 1961), Tunisian politician
- Fatma Toptaş, Turkish actress
- Fatma Turgut, Turkish musician
- Fatma Uruk (born 1988), Turkish freediver
- Fatma Yazıcı, Turkish businesswoman
- Fatma Yousif al-Ali (born 1953), Kuwaiti journalist and short story writer
- Fatma Zahra Djouad, Algerian volleyball player
- Fatma Zohra Ksentini, Algerian politician
- Fatma-Zohra Oukazi (born 1984), Algerian volleyball player
- Fatma Zohra Zamoum, Algerian writer and filmmaker
- Fatma Zouhour Toumi, Tunisian javelin thrower
- Kara Fatma (1888–1955), Turkish heroine
- Lalla Fatma N'Soumer, Algerian activist
- Melda Fatma İdrisoğlu (born 1989), Turkish water polo player

=== Fadime ===
- Fadime Sahindal
- Fadime Suna

== See also ==
- Fatima (surname list)
- Eye of Fatima
- Glossary of Islamic terms in Arabic
