= Fatima Begum =

Fatima Begum may refer to:

- Fatma Begum, Indian actress
- Fatima Begum (politician, born 1890), Pakistani politician and activist
- Fatima Begum (member of the Provincial Assembly of the Punjab)
