= Miramar (novel) =

1967 novel by Naguib Mahfouz

- 1990 edition
- Author: Naguib Mahfouz
- Original title: ميرامار
- Translator: Fatma Moussa Mahmoud, 1978
- Language: Arabic
- Genre: Novel
- Publisher: Doubleday
- Publication date: 1967 in Arabic (English translation 1978)
- Publication place: Egypt
- Media type: Print (Paperback)
- Pages: 181
- ISBN: 0-385-26478-X
- OCLC: 26262582
- Dewey Decimal: 892/.736 20
- LC Class: PJ7846.A46 M513 1993

Miramar is a novel authored by Naguib Mahfouz, an Egyptian Nobel Prize-winning author. It was written in 1967 and translated into English in 1978. It was made into a film in 1969.

== Plot summary ==
The novel is set in 1960s Alexandria at the pension Miramar. The novel follows the interactions of the residents of the pension, its Greek mistress Mariana, and her servant. The interactions of all the residents are based around the servant girl Zohra, a beautiful peasant girl from the Beheira Governorate who has abandoned her village life.

As each character in turn fights for Zohra's affections or allegiance, tensions and jealousies arise. In a style reminiscent of Akira Kurosawa's 1950 film Rashomon, the story is retold four times from the perspective of a different resident each time, allowing the reader to understand the intricacies of post-revolutionary Egyptian life.

== Symbolism ==
As with many Naguib Mahfouz novels, Miramar is rife with symbolism. The character Zohra has been proposed to symbolize the ideal modern Egyptian/Egypt. She is hard working and honest but uneducated, and constantly being pulled by different forces. Among those pulling her and Egypt are Europeans, Egyptian nationalists (Wafd party), the wealthy upper-class, the Abdel Nasser regime and its followers, and the Muslim Brotherhood.

== Characters ==
- Zohra: The central character of the novel. Zohra is a girl from the country who ran away from her family, who wanted to marry her off to an old man for his money. Coincidence brings her to the pension, where she encounters a group of men from two different generations and different political and social backgrounds.
- Amir Wagdy: A retired octogenarian journalist who lived through the glory days of the Egyptian national press, and the 1919 revolution led by Saad Zaghloul. Alexandria is now his hometown, and he has no family or relatives. He came to the pension twenty years after his last stay there because of its familial atmosphere, as well as his friendship with Marianna, with whom he is able to relive shared memories.
- Tolba Marzouk: A landlord whose money was taken in the revolution and distributed amongst the peasants.
- Hosni Allam: A person of note from the country, who owns 100 acres of land and fears that the revolution will take it from him as it did to Tolba Marzouk. A frivolous and sarcastic man who dislikes the revolution, he appears constantly confused and worries as he is torn between progressing the economic project which brought him to Alexandria, and remaining a forgotten man in the pension along with Marianna, searching for his own pleasure.
- Sarhan Al-Buhairi: A young university student who can be considered the principal character experiencing this time period. He is a poor rural man who only owns four acres to support his family. During his school days, he belonged to the Wafd Party, but he has now turned to the revolution and joined the Socialist Union, looking for the prestige to make up for what he lacks in money and social class.
- Mansour Bahi: A young journalist, seemingly a member of the Marxist anti-revolutionary organization. He is in the same position as Hosni Allam and Sarhan Al-Buhairi, confused about life.
