= Trams in Molochne =

Defunct tram system in Molochne, Russia

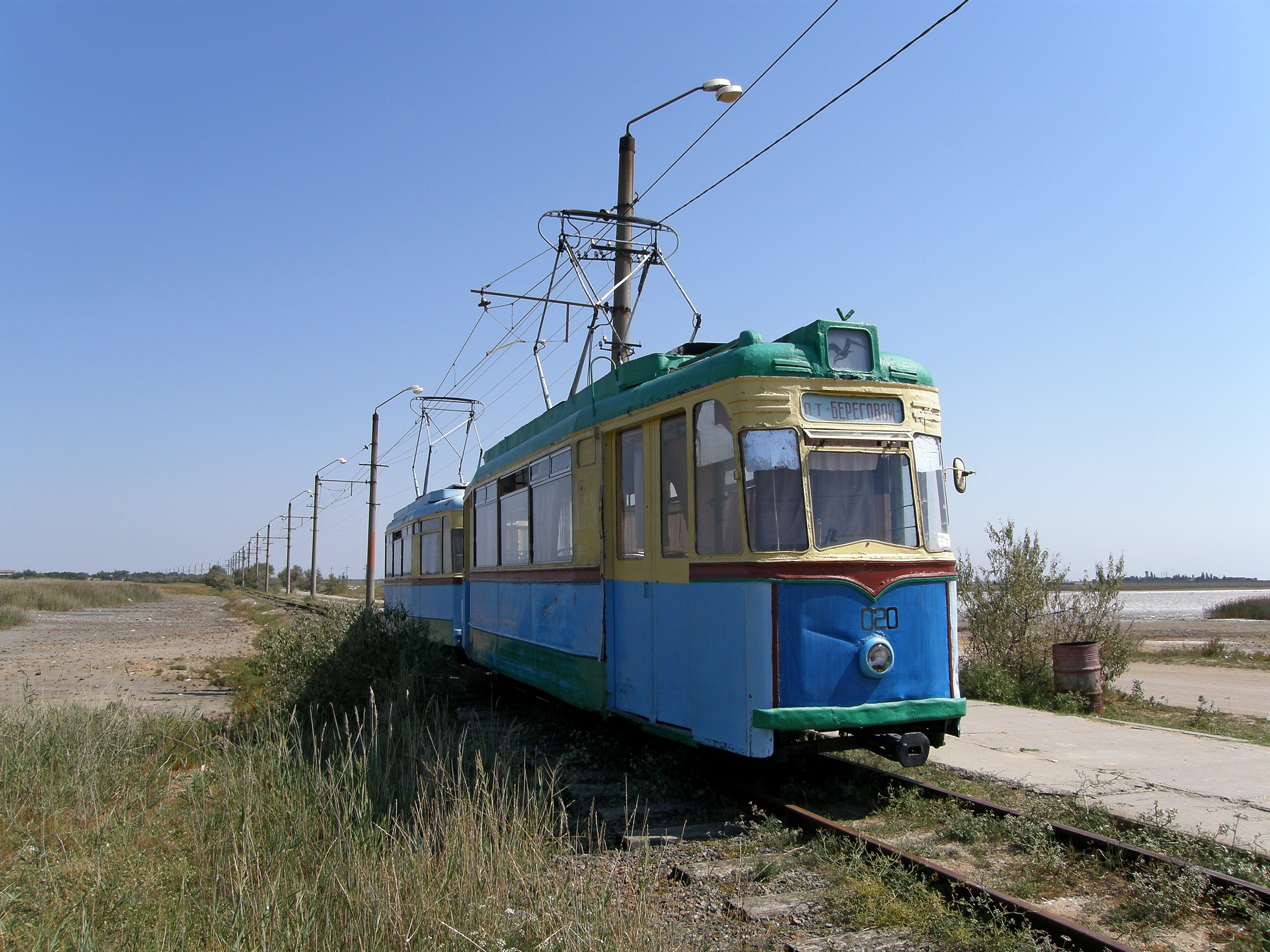
- Gotha T57 tram near Molochne in 2012

Overview
- Status: Defunct
- Locale: Molochne, Russia
- Termini: Pansionat "Beregovoy"; Plyazh
- Stations: 2

Service
- Type: Tramway
- Rolling stock: Gotha T57; Gotha T59E

History
- Opened: 18 August 1989
- Closed: September 2014

Technical
- Line length: 1.5 km (0.93 mi)
- Track gauge: 1,000 mm (3 ft 3 3/8 in)
- Electrification: 550 V
Route map

The Trams in Molochne is a defunct tram system, one of the smallest tram systems in the world, which operated from 1989 to 2014 in the village of Molochne, located near Yevpatoria, within Crimea in Ukraine (later Russia).

It was built in the USSR as a "Beregovoy" boarding house for transporting holidaymakers; however, the tram could be used by anyone, thus making it a full-fledged public transportation.

The penultimate tram system (before the Cheryomushki tram system) opened in the USSR.

== History ==
In 1986, the management of the Korosten branch of the Southwestern Railway, in search of ways to improve the health of employees (more than 10,000 people), turned to the "Beregovoĭ" sanatorium near Yevpatoria. Despite its name, it is located approximately 1.5 km (0.93 mi) from the sea, which created some difficulties, as holidaymakers were transported to the seaside by bus. The director of the sanatorium proposed a shared participation scheme to the branch. An extraordinary solution was suggested — to run a tram, which in those years, amid the gasoline crisis, would have been a salvation.

The tram network project was completed in early 1989 by the Korosten branch of the railway, and construction began in March. The supply of materials was carried out from Korosten, while the overhead line and tracks were built by the enterprises of the Korosten branch. The system was opened on 18 August 1989.

Before the 2014 Russian annexation of Crimea, the system operated every summer. The opening of the service in 2014 was delayed until the beginning of August due to the decreased flow of holidaymakers.

In the summer of 2015, the trams did not operate due to the reconstruction of the boarding house served by this line, but the boarding house was not operational by the summer of 2017 either.

Since its closure, the line has been subjected to vandalism by local residents and scrap metal collectors. As of April 2021, the catenary had been completely dismantled, and parts of the rails were partially removed. By July 2022, the line had become overgrown. Since May 2024, a portion of the line has been closed and is under protection, with the depot sealed.
