= Kyari =

- Gender: Masculine
- Language: Kanuri

Origin
- Meaning: the old man
- Region of origin: Lake Chad region

Other names
- Alternative spelling: Kiari; Chari

Kyari, sometimes spelled Kiari, is a name and surname of Kanuri origin. It means 'the old man' and is typically given to grandsons who share the same name as a grandparent. The female equivalent is 'Ka'ana' or 'Kumurso'.

== As a given name ==
- Kyari Magumeri (1897–1972), was a Nigerian Army officer who fought in both World Wars
- Kyari Mohammed (born 1963), Nigerian academic
- Muhammad Kyari ibn Abubakar (died 1894), 7th Shehu of Bornu

== As a surname ==
- Abba Kyari (1938–2018), was a Nigerian military officer who served as governor of North-Central State
- Abba Kyari (1952–2020), was a Nigerian lawyer who served as Chief of Staff to the President of Nigeria
- Abba Kyari (born 1975), former Nigerian police officer
- Abubakar Kyari (born 1963), Nigerian politician
- Fatima Kyari Mohammed, Nigerian diplomat
- Mele Kyari (born 1965), Nigerian geologist
