= Abdul Rauf Shakoori =

Pakistani academic and molecular biologist (born 1942)

Abdul Rauf Shakoori (Urdu: عبدالرؤف شکوری; born 1 October 1942) is a Pakistani academic and cell and molecular biologist. He is professor emeritus and a former director of the School of Biological Sciences at the University of the Punjab in Lahore, Pakistan.

Shakoori is an elected fellow of the Pakistan Academy of Sciences (since 1991) and The World Academy of Sciences (since 2004), and in 2019 he was inducted as an academician of the Shandong Academy of Agricultural Sciences in Jinan, China.

== Early life and education ==
Shakoori was born on 1 October 1942 in Sialkot, Pakistan. He obtained a Master of Science degree in zoology from the University of the Punjab in 1962, and completed a doctoral degree (Dr. rer. nat.) in biochemistry and cell biology at the University of Hohenheim in Stuttgart, West Germany, in 1972.

== Academic career ==
Shakoori returned to Pakistan in 1973 and rejoined the University of the Punjab as a lecturer in zoology, rising through assistant and associate professorships before his appointment as professor of zoology in 1987. He was named Meritorious Professor of zoology in 2002 and later became a Distinguished National Professor of the Higher Education Commission; he subsequently held the title of professor emeritus.

He was co-director of the Centre of Advanced Molecular Biology at the University of the Punjab from 1984 to 1991, founding director of the Department of Microbiology and Molecular Genetics from 2002, and one of three founding directors of the School of Biological Sciences from 2002 until 2019. He was also associated with the university's Cancer Research Centre.

For more than two decades Shakoori also held a visiting professorship in cell biology at the University of Massachusetts Medical Center in Worcester, United States. He was a senior Fulbright fellow at the same institution, a senior fellow of the German Academic Exchange Service at Marburg University, Germany, in 1996, and held a research fellowship from the Royal Society in 1999.

In 2019, he was inducted as an academician of the Shandong Academy of Agricultural Sciences in Jinan, China, where he also served as honorary director of its Centre for Biotechnology Research.

== Research ==
Shakoori's research interests include gene regulation in eukaryotes, biochemical toxicology, environmental biotechnology, and cancer biology.

== Honours and awards ==
Shakoori is an elected fellow of the Pakistan Academy of Sciences (since 1991), a fellow of The World Academy of Sciences and the Islamic World Academy of Sciences (both reported as since 2004), and a life fellow of the Zoological Society of Pakistan, of which he has also served as president since 2002.

He received Pakistan's Aizaz-i-Kamal award in 1996, the Tamgha-i-Imtiaz civil award in 1999, and a Scientist of the Year award from Pakistan's Ministry of Education in 1986. He was named the Zoological Society of Pakistan's Zoologist of the Year in 1996/1997. In 2011, the Pakistan Academy of Sciences named him Distinguished Scientist of the Year, and in 2012 he received an International ECO Award in Science and Technology at the twelfth summit of the Economic Cooperation Organization in Baku, Azerbaijan.
