= Fadumo =

Fadumo is a given name, the Somali spelling of Fatima.

== People with the given name ==
- Fadumo Korn
- Fadumo Saeed Ibrahim, Somaliland politician, born 1961
- Fadumo Jibriil, Somali environmentalist, conservationist, humanitarian
- Fadumo Dayib, Somali politician
- Fadumo Siyaad, Somali fashion model
- Fadumo Ahmed Dhimbiil, Djiboutian poet, rapper, singer, and songwriter
- Fadumo Ahmed Alin, Somali politician
