= Moghimi =

Moghimi is an Iranian surname.

Notable persons with the name include:

- Ahmad Ali Moghimi (born 1957, Iranian politician
- Babak Moghimi, Iranian Olympic boxer
- Fatemeh Moghimi, Iranian engineer and political activist
- Mohammad-Hossein Moghimi, Iranian politician
- Moein Moghimi, British professor and medical researcher
