= Ardjoune =

Ardjoune is a surname. Notable people with the surname include:

- Abdellah Ardjoune (born 2001), Algerian swimmer
- Fatima Zohra Ardjoune, Algerian Army general
