= Mezwed =

Music genre

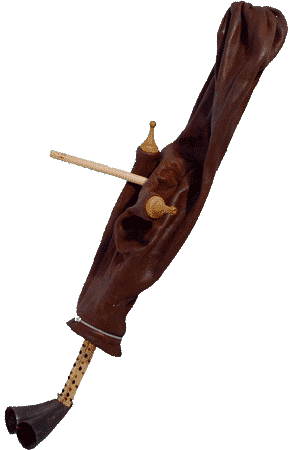
A mizwad bagpipe

Mezwed (Arabic: مزود) is a genre of popular traditional music based on Tunisian scale rhythms. It incorporates traditional North African drums called Darbouka and a kind of bagpipe called a mizwad with a bag made from ewe's leather. Usually, it is sung in Tunisian and Libyan linguistic varieties. Originally the music of the countryside and the working classes; it is often played at weddings and parties.

Popular music literally translates in Tunisian to chaabi music which is associated with folkloric mezwed music. Ben Ali, the second President of Tunisia, positively associated mezwed with the working-class. The themes of Mezwed are social, family, and love. New fusions of mezwed, with hip-hop and rap are becoming popular. Some of the most popular singers include Fatma Boussaha, Samir Loussif, and Hedi Habbouba.

== Artists ==
- Hichem Lekhdhiri
- Fathi Weld Fajra
- Fatma Boussaha
- Hedi Habbouba
- Samir Loussif
- Saleh El Farzit
- Lotfi Jormana
