= Fatima Boubekdi =

Moroccan filmmaker

- Born: May 7, 1970 (age 56); Casablanca, Morocco
- Occupations: Filmmaker; screenwriter
- Years active: 1995 – present

Fatima Boubekdi (born May 17, 1970, in Casablanca) is a Moroccan filmmaker, screenwriter, dramatist. She studied film directing in Morocco, graduating from the ISADAC. She is known for her works that draw inspiration from Moroccan folklore.

== Biography ==
After a brief theatrical training in Casablanca, and in Rabat at the High Institute of Theatrical Arts and Cultural Animation, Boubekdi discovered a penchant for directing. She worked alongside Farida Bourquia in 1995 as an assistant director. A year later, she wrote screenplays with filmmakers Mohamed Ismaïl, Hassan Benjelloun and Abdelmajid R'chich. In 1999, she directed her first television film, The Door of Hope. In 2006, she won three prizes at the second edition of the National Amazigh Film Festival for Hammou Ounamir (Grand Prize, Best Directing) and Imouran (Best Screenplay). In 2021, Boubekdi released her first feature film, Annatto.

The filmmaker, who speaks Arabic and Berber, is passionate about Amazigh culture, the primary language in many of her work being Berber, as well as folklore and Moroccan history, both recurrent themes in her films.

== Filmography ==
- Kabran Hmad (2005)
- Hammou Ounamir (2006)
- Imouran (2006)
- The Door of Hope (2006)
- Annatto (2021)
