= Fatima Mujib Bilqees =

Pakistani parasitologist and helminthologist

Fatima Mujib Bilqees دانشمند فاطمہ مجیب بلقیس
- Born: February 10, 1936
- Died: February 7, 2016 (aged 79)
- Occupations: Parasitologist and Helminthologist

Fatima Mujib Bilqees (Urdu: دانشمند فاطمہ مجیب بلقیس) was a Pakistani scientist, who specialised in parasitology, particularly helminthology.

== Early life ==
Bilqees was born on February 10, 1936. She did her PhD in Parasitology from University of Toronto in 1966. She did her higher doctorate (Sc.D) from the United States and D.Sc from University of Karachi in 1979. She was also a diploma holder of World Cultural Council, Germany.

== Career ==
Bilqees began her career as a scientist by publishing scientific articles in Urdu language, She published more than 75 scientific articles in this language. She also published more than 500 research papers in the English language as well as multiple books.

She initiated the Pakistan Journal of Parasitology in 1985, which publishes international research work in the field. This journal is published twice a year covering research papers, review articles and bibliographies on all aspects of parasitic groups.

She was also a member of various academic societies such as Helminthological Society of Washington and Organization for Women in Science for the Developing World. She also served as 'Vice-President (South)' in Zoological society of Pakistan.

== Personal life ==
Bilqees had two daughters.

She died on February 7, 2016, at the age of 79.

== Legacy ==
Almost 1000 worms have been discovered by her and 40 new species have been named after her. She also has a place on wall of doctoral faculty in many universities because she supervised doctoral research programs in many including University of Baluchistan, Jinnah University for Women, Federal Urdu University and Sindh University.

== Awards ==
Bilqees won the following major awards for her academic work:

- Life Time Achievement Award by Zoological Society of Pakistan in recognition of her life long research contributions in the field of Parasitology
- Shield for Scientific Contribution in Plant Nematology by Karachi University
- Nishan-e-Azmat-e-Ilm by Karachi University
- Gold medal from the Pakistan Academy of Sciences in recognition of her research contributions in Zoology
- Women scientist award from the President of Pakistan.
