= Quill (podcasting) =

Canadian podcast agency

Quill Inc
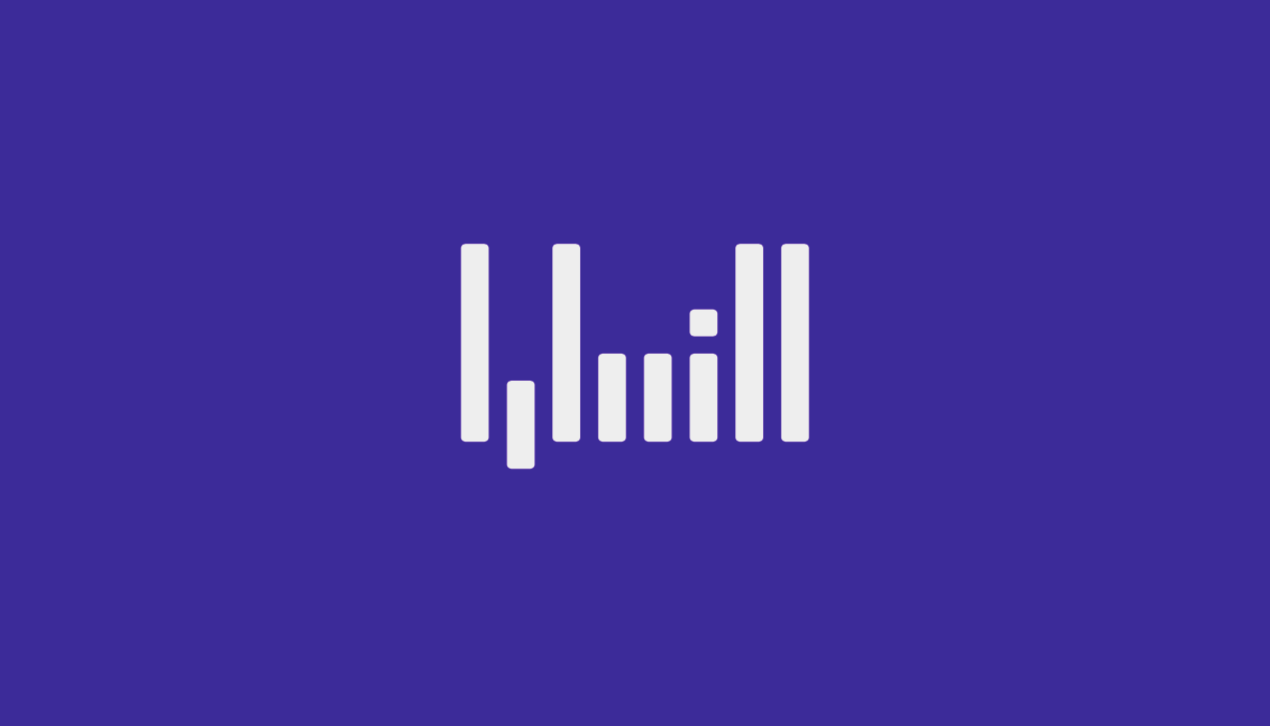
- Trade name: Quill
- Type: Private, limited liability company
- Industry: Podcasting
- Genre: Interview
- Founders: Fatima Zaidi
- Headquarters: Toronto, Ontario, Canada
- Area served: Worldwide
- Products: CoHost
- Number of employees: 20
- Website: www.quillpodcasting.com

Quill Inc is a branded podcast agency. It was founded by Fatima Zaidi in Toronto, CA, and offers production services.

== History ==
In 2019, Fatima Zaidi left Toronto PR firm, Eighty-Eight. In the same year, Zaidi founded Quill. Quill started as a marketplace for creators who are looking for podcast freelancers. Zaidi and the Quill team created podcasts for North American businesses at this time. In 2020, Quill pivoted to focus solely on audio production as a Canadian podcast agency. In 2022, Quill launched CoHost, a podcast hosting and analytics platform built for brands and agencies.

In 2020, Quill acquired Origins Media Haus, a boutique branded podcast agency founded by Stephanie Andrews, Alison Osborne, and Brittany Nguyen. With this acquisition, Quill onboarded all Origins Media Haus employees, including Stephanie Andrews who became Quill's Head of Production (currently Quill's Director of Product), Alison Osborne who became Quill's Head of Marketing (currently Quill's Director of Growth Marketing), and Brittany Nguyen who became Quill's Head of Sound & Technical Production (currently Quill's Head of Sound Engineering & Product Design).

== Branded podcasts ==
- Expedia Group Main Article: Powering Travel
- TD Bank Main Article: C Suite
- CIBC Main Article: CIBC Innovation Banking
- Amdocs Main Article: The Great Indoors and Point of View
- Heart and Stroke Foundation Main Article: The Beat
- SickKids Foundation Main Article: SickKids VS
- Axway Main Article: Transform it Forward

== Quill Podcast Awards ==
In 2021, Quill launched the Quill Podcast Awards, a yearly digital awards ceremony. Award categories feature both podcast companies and creators including, Podcast of the Year, Host of the Year, Branded Podcast of the Year, Best New Company, Best Podcast Tech, and Innovator of the Year.

Previous winners include HeadGum, Castbox, and The New York Times podcast, The Daily (podcast).
