= Fatima Zaidi =

Canadian entrepreneur

- Born: 1989 (age 36–37); Muscat, Oman
- Occupations: Entrepreneur, University Lecturer
- Years active: 2016–present
- Employer: University of Toronto (lecturer)
- Known for: Founder & CEO of Quill Inc and CoHost
- Website: quillpodcasting.com

Fatima Zaidi (born in 1989) is a Canadian entrepreneur, University lecturer at the University of Toronto, and co-chair of Tech4SickKids at SickKids Hospital.

She is the founder and CEO of Quill Inc, a Canadian podcast agency, and CoHost, a podcast hosting and analytics tool for brands and agencies.

== Early life and family ==
Zaidi was born in Muscat, Oman, to Pakistani parents. She moved to Toronto, Canada, in 2007.

== Career ==
In 2016, Zaidi became the VP of Business Development for the Toronto marketing agency, Eighty-Eight. In the same year, she began appearing on segments for BNN Bloomberg on the challenges female founders face in entrepreneurship.

In 2019, Zaidi launched Quill Inc, a branded podcast agency that works with North American brands. In 2021, Quill Inc launched CoHost, a podcast hosting and analytics tool for brands and agencies.

Since 2016, Zaidi has been an advisor for startup companies Willful and Abacus Agency. In 2021, Zaidi took on a teaching position at the University of Toronto School of Continuing Education to educate students on podcasting.

In 2020, Zaidi became the co-chair of the #Tech4SickKids council for SickKids Hospital.

== Awards and recognition ==
Since 2016, Zaidi has won two Top 30 under 30 awards by Marketing Magazine and Bay Street Bull, the Young Professional of the Year by Notable Life, Veuve Clicquot's Bold Future Award, The Women in Content Marketing Award, Bay Street Bull's Woman of the Year, and one of Flare Magazine's Top 100 Women.
