= Fatima Babiker Mahmoud =

Sudanese feminist

- Citizenship: Sudan
- Education: University of Khartoum
- Occupation: Feminist

Fatima Babiker Mahmoud (Arabic: فاطمة بابكر محمود) is a Sudanese-born socialist feminist.

== Biography ==
She graduated from the University of Khartoum and earned her doctorate at the University of Hull. Her doctoral thesis was the basis of her most-frequently cited work, The Sudanese Bourgeoisie:Vanguard of Development? in which she traced the historical development of the modern Sudanese bourgeoisie and concluded that it had no progressive role to play in the development of Sudan.

== Career ==
The Pan-African Women's Liberation Organisation (PAWLO) was established at the time of the 7th Pan-African Conference in Kampala, Uganda in April 1994, and Mahmoud became its founding President. Addressing the first meeting of PAWLO, she said:

"African women share a common history, a common conceptual framework in understanding our reality in order to change it, and common enemies and friends within and outside Africa. We have similar challenges to face and a better future to look forward to. There is now a serious need for a new Pan African Women's organisation, embracing African women on the continent and in the diaspora, to address these commonalities."

Mahmoud has previously served as a member of the Editorial Advisory Board for the Journal of Gender Studies.

== Selected writing ==
- المرأة الافريقية بين الارث والحداثة (African Women Between Heritage and Modernity) (2002)
- African Women, Transformation and Development (1991)
- Calamity in the Sudan: Civilian Versus Military Rule (1988)
- The Sudanese Bourgeoisie: Vanguard of Development? (1984)
