= Pension (lodging) =

Type of guest house or boarding house

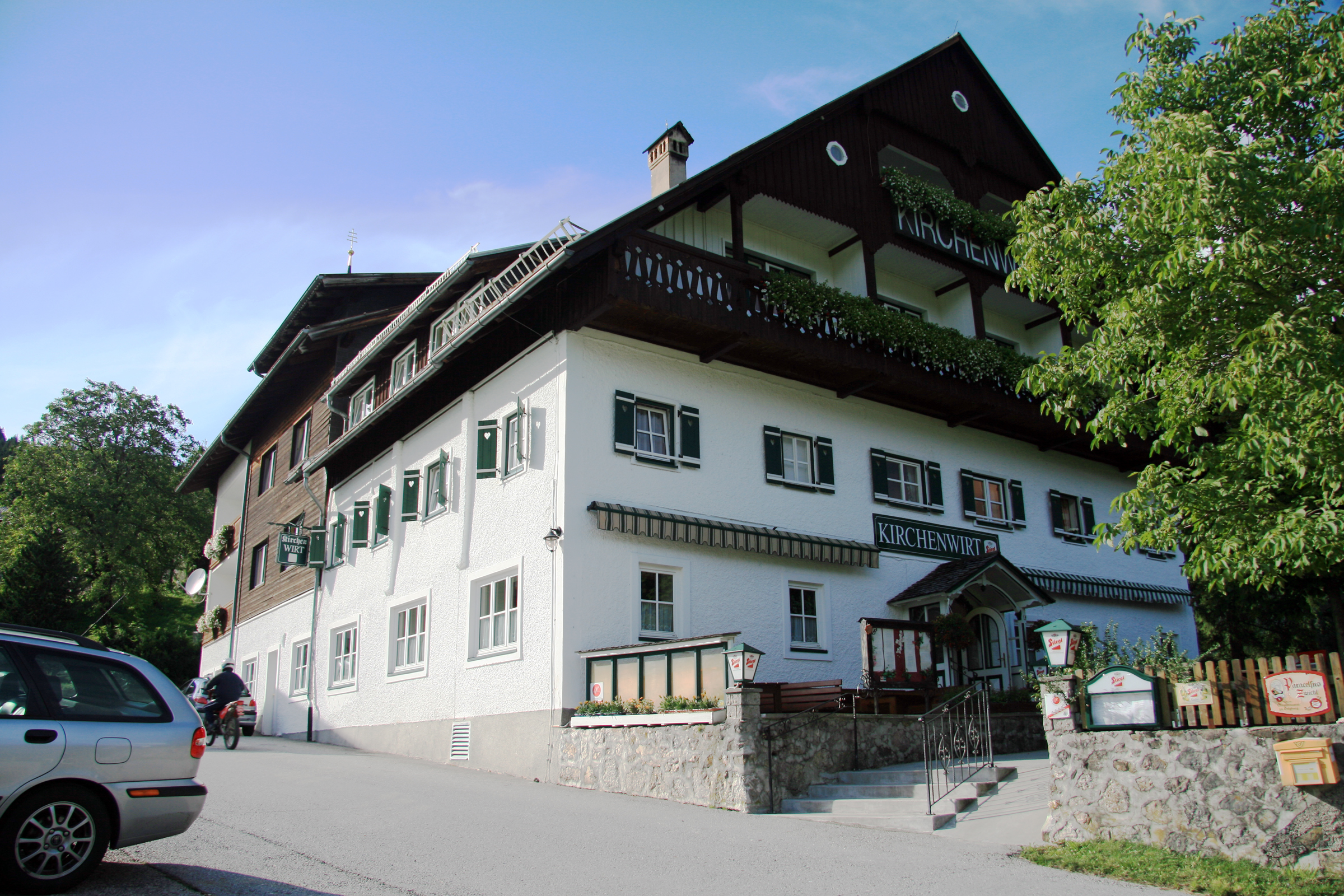
A pension in the village of Gosau, Upper Austria

A pension (UK: /ˈpɒ̃sjɒ̃/, US: /pɒnˈsjoʊn/; French: [pɑ̃sjɔ̃]) is a type of guest house or boarding house. The term is typically used in Continental European countries and in areas of North Africa and the Middle East that formerly had large European expatriate populations, and in some parts of South America, such as Brazil and Paraguay. Pensions can also be found in South Korea, Japan, and the Philippines.

In contrast to bed and breakfasts, more usual in Anglosphere nations, pensions typically offer not only breakfast but also lunch, dinner, and sometimes even tea. Rather than paying for the room and each meal separately, guests select a plan that either comprises overnight accommodation, breakfast, lunch, and dinner ("full pension" / "full board"), or the preceding minus lunch ("half board / demi-pension" / "half pension").

== In popular culture ==
Literature

- Naguib Mahfouz's 1967 novel, Miramar, focuses on the lives of the long-term residents of the eponymous pension in Alexandria in the 1960s.
- E. M. Forster's 1908 novel, A Room with a View, opens with the protagonist Lucy Honeychurch and her spinster cousin and chaperone Charlotte Bartlett complaining about the Pensione Bertolini, where they are staying in Florence, Italy.
- The Pension Grillparzer is presented as a work of fiction within the 1978 novel The World According to Garp by John Irving.

Film

- In Summertime, an American/British romantic film, Katharine Hepburn stars as Jane Hudson, a single, middle-aged elementary school secretary, who goes on her summer vacation to Venice, Italy. Arriving by water taxi, she stays at the Pensione Fiorini, owned by the Signora Fiorini (Isa Miranda), a widow who transformed her home into a pension after World War II.
- In Only You, Marisa Tomei as Faith Corvatch and Bonnie Hunt as Kate Corvatch are directed to a pension by Joaquim de Almeida as Giovanni, where they stay while in Rome.
