= Fadumo Dayib =

Somali politician

Fadumo Qasim Dayib

Personal details
- Born: 1972 (age 53–54) Thika, Kenya
- Education: Laurea University (BS); University of Eastern Finland (MPH, MS); Harvard University (MPA); University of Helsinki

Fadumo Qasim Dayib, nicknamed Deeqo -which means "Gift" in Somali-, is a Somali politician and the first woman to run for President of Somalia, standing for the November 2016 election.

== Early life and education ==
Dayib was born in 1972 in Thika, Kenya to Somali parents. Her mother travelled there after losing eleven previous children to preventable diseases. Her father, who was a truck driver, gave her mother and young brother a lift. They married on their way to Kenya and settled in Thika. Both of her parents were illiterate yet her father spoke several languages. And her mother was an enterprising business woman, who sold tea by the roadside. She had two more siblings born in Kenya. Her parents divorced when she was young. Her family were expelled from Nairobi in 1989 and deported to Mogadishu. Her mother was temporarily imprisoned because her brother was suspected of funding a group opposed to Siad Barre. Dayib's mother sold everything to enable her and her siblings to escape as refugees to Finland, where she has lived since 1990.

Dayib did not learn to read and write until she was fourteen years old. She studied in Finland to become a critical care nurse, earning two master's degrees. She won a fellowship to the Harvard Kennedy School to study public administration. She is a doctoral candidate at the University of Helsinki researching United Nations Security Council Resolution 1325 (Peace, Women and Security).

== Career ==
Dayib is a social change activist, a public health expert and a development practitioner. She has worked in the private sector on employment for refugees. She worked for the United Nations in Somalia setting up maternal health clinics in 2005 but was evacuated due to security concerns. She then set up HIV prevention offices and trained health care providers for the UN in Fiji and Liberia.In 2017, Fadumo became the first Somali woman to ever hold the position of country director in UN Somalia.

Dayib announced her intention to run for President of Somalia in 2014 in the first democratic elections to be held since 1967. She was one of eighteen presidential candidates in 2016, including incumbent Hassan Sheikh Mohamud and eventual winner Mohamed Abdullahi Mohamed. She was the only female. Her decision to stand for the presidency attracted death threats. Her platform included anti-corruption policies, taking on female genital mutilation, ending the 4.5 clan-based governance system and dialoguing with al-Shabaab to encourage the group to cut their ties to international terrorist organisations and stop killing Somalis. She said that she had very little chance of winning because of corruption and the 4.5 clan-based governance system.

== Personal life ==
Dayib has four children. She has declared her intention to continue being involved in the betterment of Somalia even after the election. Fadumo currently lives in Nairobi with her family.
