= Fatemeh Sohrabi =

Iranian footballer (born 1990)

Personal information
- Full name: Fatemeh Sohrabi
- Date of birth: 6 September 1990 (age 36)
- Place of birth: Kerman, Iran
- Position: Defender

Team information
- Current team: Mes Rafsanjan
- Number: 4

Senior career*
Years	Team	Apps	(Gls)
- Mes Rafsanjan

International career^{‡}
2018–	Iran	7	(0)
- * Club domestic league appearances and goals ‡ National team caps and goals as of 9 April 2019

Fatemeh Sohrabi (Persian: فاطمه سهرابی; born 6 September 1990) is an Iranian footballer who plays as a defender for Kowsar Women Football League club Mes Rafsanjan FC and the senior Iran women's national team.
