= Fatima al-Fudayliya =

19th-century Islamic scholar

Fatima bint Hamad al-Fudayliyya
- Title: Shaykha

Personal life
- Born: Emirate of Zubair
- Died: 1831 AD, 1247 AH Makkah, Hijaz Province under Eyalet of Egypt, Ottoman Empire
- Region: Arabia
- Main interest(s): usul, Fiqh, Tafsir, Sufism
- Occupation: Islamic scholar

Religious life
- Religion: Islam
- Denomination: Sunni
- Jurisprudence: Hanbali

Muslim leader
- Influenced by: Ibrahim ibn Jadid
- Influenced: Umar ibn Abdul Karim al-Hanafi, Muhammad Salih al-Shafi'i

Fatima bint Hamad al-Fudayliyya, also known as Al-Shaykha al-Fudayliyya (died 1831) was an 18th and 19th-century Muslim scholar of hadith and jurist. She is considered one of the last scholars in a long line of female muhaddith.

== Biography ==
=== Early life ===
Fatima bint Hamad al-Fudayliyya was born before the end of the twelfth Islamic century, and soon excelled in the art of calligraphy and the various Islamic sciences. She had a special interest in hadith, read a good deal on the subject, received the diplomas of a good many scholars, and acquired a reputation as an important muhaddith in her own right.

=== Scholarship ===
She studied under many scholars in the Emirate of Zubair such as Sheikh Ibrahim ibn Jadid. She was also an expert on usul, fiqh and tafsir. In Mecca her lectures were attended by many eminent muhaddith, who received certificates from her. Among them, of particular mention were Umar al-Hanafi and Muhammad Salih. The scholars who studied with her praised her for her piety, righteousness and practice of zuhd. She was also highly regarded for writing books in beautiful calligraphy. Collecting books was a passion of hers and she amassed written works in all Islamic disciplines. She also had a well-established tradition in Sufism and guided many people, especially women, who would become her companions and through her guidance and instruction these women became known for their piety, adherence to religious duties, patience, and overall good conduct.

=== Later life and death ===
She performed Hajj and settled in Makkah in the Bab al-Ziyada neighborhood in a house next to Masjid al-Haram. Many scholars from Makkah would come to teach her and learn from her. She would give them permission to transmit hadith from her. These scholars included Umar ibn Abd al-Rasul al-Hanafi and Muhammad ibn Salih al-Rayyis, the mufti of the Shafi'i school. In Makkah she founded a rich public library. She appointed Sheikh Muhammad al-Hudaybi as the supervisor of her books. He kept them until he moved to Madinah.

She lost her sight towards the end of her life and remained blind for two years. There is a miraculous story that was widely circulated in which she saw the Prophet Muhammad with Abu Bakr and Umar in a dream. The prophet Muhammad gave her some of his saliva and she wiped her eyes with it, miraculously regaining her sight. A more detailed account of the story states that one day she fell and broke two of her ribs and in her dream she wiped her ribs in addition to her eyes, leading to her ribs miraculously healing along with her sight. She died in 1831 (Hijri 1247). She was buried in Al-Mu’alla in Sha’bat Al-Nur in the enclosure of the late scholar Sheikh Muhammad Saleh Al-Rayyis, next to his grave in accordance to her will.
