= Fatima Abdullah Al-Mal =

Qatari criminal judge

Fatima Abdullah Al-Mal (Arabic: فَاطِمَة عبد الله المال) is a Qatari judge on the Supreme Judiciary Council. She was one of the first female judges in Qatar, the first Qatari woman to serve as a criminal judge and is one of a small number of women to work as a criminal judge in the Arab League.

== Biography ==
Al-Mal holds both a Bachelor and Master of Laws from Qatar University in Doha. Her father was a public prosecutor and encouraged her interest in law from a young age, while her mother, a teacher, encouraged her to pursue a university education. She completed her three-year judicial training in 2015 and was sworn in as the first female Qatari criminal judge in 2015. Since her appointment, an additional six women have been appointed as judges in Qatar.
