= Fatima Boudouani =

Algerian army officer

- Military career
- Allegiance: Algeria
- Branch: Algerian People's National Army
- Rank: Major-General

Major-General Fatima Boudouani is an Algerian army officer.

Boudouani is a lawyer from Tipaza. She joined the analysis and business branch of the Algerian People's National Army in 1978 after President Houari Boumédiène opened admission to women. Boudouani later transferred to the Department of National Defense's (DND) general secretariat and then to the legal branch of the aviation command where she became head of international affairs. In 2010 she became a specialist at the DND and sat on the steering committee of its 5+5 initiative.

On 5 July 2012, she was promoted to the rank of major-general. As of 2017, she was one of four female generals in the Algerian Army.
