= Fatma Ali =

Tanzanian politician

Member of the Tanzanian Parliament
- In office 2005–2010
- Constituency: Special Seat

Personal details
- Born: 28 September 1950 (age 75)
- Party: CCM

Fatma Othman Ali (born 28 September 1950) is a Tanzanian politician who served as a member of parliament in the 9th Tanzanian Parliament. She is a member of the ruling Chama Cha Mapinduzi party.
