= Fátima Carneiro =

Portuguese anatomical pathologist and cancer researcher

- Born: 1954 (age 71–72); Lubango, Angola
- Occupation: Professor of anatomical pathology
- Awards: Grand Officer of the Order of Prince Henry

Fátima Carneiro is a Portuguese pathologist. Since 2001 she has been director of the Pathological Anatomy Service at the University Hospital of São João in Porto. In September 2018 she was voted first in a list of the hundred "Best & Brightest" pathologists in the world by the magazine The Pathologist.

== Early life and studies ==
Fátima Carneiro was born in 1954 in Sá da Bandeira, now Lubango, in what was then Portuguese Angola. Her parents were teachers and she had a brother. State employees working in Portuguese colonies, such as her parents, spent four years overseas and one year in Portugal before returning to the colony. As a result, she started High School in Portugal and also did her sixth year there. After Angola, her parents were posted to São Tomé. Later, the family returned to Angola, living in the capital, Luanda, where she studied medicine for three years before leaving due to the Angolan War of Independence. She then settled in Porto with her parents, completing a degree in medicine at the Faculty of Medicine of the University of Porto in 1978. Initially, she wanted to be a pediatrician but found that she could not face the suffering of children, so she decided to concentrate on pathology. In 1988 she qualified as a specialist in anatomical pathology and in 1993 received a doctorate in anatomical pathology from the University of Porto.

== Career ==
After receiving her doctorate Carneiro became a senior investigator at the Institute of Molecular Pathology and Immunology of the University of Porto (IPATIMUP). She is now also a researcher at the Instituto de Investigação e Inovação em Saúde da Universidade do Porto (Institute of Investigation and Innovation in Health of the University of Porto (i3S). In 2001, she was made a professor of anatomical pathology at the University of Porto Medical Faculty, where she is now a full professor, and, in the same year, was appointed as head of department of anatomical pathology at the University Hospital of São João in Porto. Also in 2001, she became a member of the executive committee of the European Society of Pathology. From 2006 to 2009, Carneiro was vice-president of the Portuguese National Academy of Medicine; in 2007 she was a member of the Scientific Council of the International Gastric Cancer Association and in 2011-2013 she was president of the European Society of Pathology. She coordinated the Portuguese National Network of Tumour Banks in 2008. In 2009 Carneiro was the Portuguese delegate to the European Union's Seventh Framework Programme to discuss Theme 1, Health Cooperation. From 2017 she chaired the National Academy of Medicine. She is a member of the European Society of Pathology's Working Group on Digestive Diseases.

Carneiro specialises in stomach cancer research, which is the third-deadliest type of cancer in Portugal. Her research projects have been directed towards the understanding of the etiopathogenesis of gastric cancer, mainly focusing on the study of the interplay between Helicobacter pylori virulence factors and host genetic susceptibility; and to the molecular basis of sporadic and familial gastric carcinoma development, with an emphasis on hereditary diffuse gastric cancer. She is an editor of the volume on Tumours of the Digestive System (part of the WHO Blue Books on Classification of Tumours). She is the managing editor of Virchows Archiv, the European Journal of Pathology. In addition, she is, or has been, on the editorial board of Pathology Update, the Journal of Cellular and Molecular Medicine (JCMM), Jornal Português de Gastrenterologia and the Turkish Journal of Pathology.

== Awards and honours ==
- Carneiro was made a Grand Officer of the Order of Prince Henry (Portuguese: Ordem do Infante Dom Henrique) in 2006.
- She was awarded the Prémio Seiva prize for science in 2017.
- In 2018 she was chosen by the journal, The Pathologist, as the first on a list of 100 Best & Brightest in the field of pathology. She was highlighted for her "skills as a pathologist and university professor, as an expert in her area of expertise and for her leadership skills".
- In 2020 she received the Municipal Gold Medal of Merit from the City of Porto for her contribution to the "common good of the city".

== Publications ==
Carneiro is the author or co-author of more than two hundred and fifty scientific articles and has contributed to the development of several chapters of specialty books. A selection of her publications is listed below:

- Carneiro F. Hereditary GI Cancer Syndromes. The Journal of Pathology 246: S6-S6, 2018. (Meeting Abstract)
- Carneiro F. Promoting Pathology Pan European Networks: Science & Technology. 2013.
- Carneiro F. Pathology of Hereditary Gastric Cancer. In Spotlight on Familial and Hereditary Gastric Cancer. Corso G and Roviello F (eds), Springer, 141–156, 2013.
- Carneiro F. & Lauwers G. Epithelial tumours of the stomach. In Morson and Dawson's: Gastrointestinal Pathology, Fifth Edition. Shepherd N, Warren B, Williams G, Greenson J, Lauwers G and Novelli M (eds), Blackwell Publishing Ltd. 180–222, 2013.
- Carneiro F, Oliveira C, Seruca R. Hereditary diffuse gastric cancer and other gastric cancers associated with hereditary predisposition syndromes. InMolecular Pathology of Neoplastic Diseases. Sepúlveda AR, Lynch JP (eds), Springer, New York. 83–107, 2013.
- Carneiro F. Hereditary gastric cancer. Der Pathologe 33 Suppl 2: 231–4, 2012. (Article) doi: 10.1007/s00292-012-1677-6 PMID 23052347.
- Carneiro F, Oliveira C, Seruca R. Pathology and genetics of familial gastric cancer. International Journal of Surgical Pathology 18: 33S-36S, 2010. (Article; Proceedings Paper). doi: 10.1177/1066896910366463 PMID 20484258.
- Carneiro F. Molecular pathology tools in gastrointestinal pathology. International Journal of Surgical Pathology 18: 53S-55S, 2010. )Article; Proceedings Paper). doi: 10.1177/1066896910368593 PMID 20484262.
- Carneiro F, Oliveira C, Suriano G, Seruca R. Molecular pathology of familial gastric cancer, with an emphasis on hereditary diffuse gastric cancer. Journal of Clinical Pathology 61: 25–30, 2008. (Article). doi: 10.1136/jcp.2006.043679 PMID 17513507.
- Carneiro F, Chaves P. Pathologic risk factors of adenocarcinoma of the gastric cardia and gastroesophageal junction. Surgical oncology clinics of North America 15: 697–714, 2006. (Review) doi: 10.1016/j.soc.2006.07.012 PMID 17030268.
- Carneiro F, Machado JC, David L, Reis C, Nogueira AM, Sobrinho-Simões M. Current thoughts on the histopathogenesis of gastric cancer. European Journal of Cancer Prevention 10: 101–2, 2001. (Article; Proceedings Paper). PMID 11263582.
- Carneiro F. Doença citomegálica em doentes infectados pelo VIH. Revista Portuguesa de Doenças Infecciosas 2. 1999: 80–88, 1999.
- Carneiro F, David L, Seruca R, Castedo S, Nesland JM, Sobrinho-Simões M. Hyperplastic polyposis and diffuse carcinoma of the stomach. A study of a family. Cancer 72: 323–9, 1993. (Article). PMID 8319165.
