= Fatima Saad =

Syrian actress (1956–2025)

Fatima Saad فاطمة سعد
- Born: 15 January 1956; Damascus, Syria
- Died: 11 May 2025 (aged 69)
- Occupations: Actress, voice actress
- Years active: 1978–2025

Fatima Saad (Arabic: فاطمة سعد, 15 January 1956 – 11 May 2025) was a Syrian actress. She worked in Venus Centre as a dub actress.

== Death ==
Saad died on 11 May 2025, at the age of 69.

== Works ==
=== Dubbing ===
- Animaniacs – Dot Warner
- Pokémon as Jesse (1st voice), Melanie (ep10)
- One Piece
- Naruto (season 1 only) as Hinata Hyuga, Konohamaru Sarutobi, Kurenai Yūhi, Haku, Tsunami, Suzume
- Digimon Adventure as Zain (Joe Kido), Tentomon, Puppetmon
  - Digimon Adventure 02 as Arukenimon, LadyDevimon, DemiDevimon
  - Digimon Tamers as Kazu Shioda
  - Digimon Frontier as Lucemon Chaos Mode
- Hunter × Hunter (1999) as the mother of Mito Freecss, Feitan Portor, Shizuku Murasaki, Baise, Pakunoda, Eliza
- Jungle Book: Boy Mowgli as Luri, THUNDER, Meshua
- Captain Tsubasa as Jun Misugi (young) (seasons 2,4,5), Takeshi Sawada (season 2) Natsuko Ozora (seasons 2,4,5), Kazuo Tachibana (season 4), Hajime Taki (season 5), Manabu Okawa (season 5)
- Aoi Blink as Blink
- Dash! Yonkuro as Shinkuro Minami, Nanny
- Grimm's Fairy Tale Classics
- Trapp Family Story as Maria Kutschera von Trapp, Rosy
- Robin Hood (1990 TV series) as Cleo, Winnifred
- Tiger Mask II as Midori Ariyoshi
- The Legend of Zorro (anime series) as MARIA
- Christopher Columbus (anime)
- Honō no Tōkyūji: Dodge Danpei as Taiga Nikaidō, Haruka Ichigeki, LAZARO
- Nadia: The Secret of Blue Water as Grandis Granva, Ikorina
- Ironfist Chinmi
- Detective Conan as Yukiko Kudo (seasons 2 and 3), Mitsuhiko Tsuburaya (season 3), Genta Kojima (seasons 4,6), Miwako Sato (season 4), Vermouth (ep 178)
  - Detective Conan: The Fourteenth Target as Genta Kojima
  - Detective Conan: The Last Wizard of the Century as Genta Kojima
- Phantom 2040 as Gorda, Rebecca Madison
- The Magic School Bus (TV series)
- Yokoyama Mitsuteru Sangokushi
- The Rainbow Fish as Mrs. Chips, Wanda
- Animaniacs as Dot Warner, Cleopatra
- Dragon Ball as Launch
- Dragon Ball Z (season 1 only) as Oolong, Pigero, Fortuneteller Baba
- Bakusō Kyōdai Let's & Go!! as Tokichi Mikuni, Tamami Yanagi
  - Bakusō Kyōdai Let's & Go!! WGP as Tokichi Mikuni, Tamami Yanagi
  - Bakusō Kyōdai Let's & Go!! MAX as Tokichi Mikuni
