= Fatma Omar An-Najar =

Palestinian suicide bomber

Fatma Omar Mahmoud An-Najar (Arabic: فاطمة عمر محمود النجار, romanized: Fāṭimah ʻUmar Maḥmūd al-Najjār; died 23 November 2006) was a Palestinian grandmother and suicide bomber who lived in the Gaza Strip. On 23 November 2006, she detonated explosives she was wearing on a belt, and injured several Israeli soldiers near Beit Lahia and the Jabalia Camp in northern Gaza. Hamas claimed responsibility for the bombing. Her family said she was 64.

== Life ==
An-Najar was a mother of nine children and a grandmother of between 35 and 38 people. During the First Intifada she had sheltered Hamas militants and the Israeli army had demolished her home. Her husband had died in 2005 and a grandson had been shot dead in 2002. At the time of her death, she was 57 according to Hamas and her family said she was 64.

== Death ==
An-Najar blew herself up on 23 November 2006, becoming the oldest out of the one hundred suicide bombers from the previous six years. Her motivation was Israeli attacks on the nearby Jabalia Camp in the Gaza Strip. She approached Israeli soldiers near the town of Beit Lahia and detonated the explosives on her belt when they threw stun grenades at her. Several soldiers were reported to have been wounded. In her martyrdom video, An-Najar said she made the attack in the name of Hamas and its military leader Mohammed Deif.
