= Fatemeh Moosavi =

Iranian film director, photographer, and script writer

- فاطمه موسوی
- Born: August 23, 1983 (age 42); Booshehr, Iran
- Occupations: director; Documentarian; Photographer; Script writer; Producer
- Years active: 2009–present

Fatemeh Moosavi (Persian: فاطمه موسوی, born August 23, 1983) is an Iranian film director, photographer, script writer, and film producer. Her two most successful documentaries are Swallow produced in 2013 and My Heritage Singing in 2015, which both were chosen film of Iran international documentary film festival.

== Early life ==
Moosavi initially studied architecture at the University of Tehran. She later pursued her interest in filmmaking and earned a Bachelor's degree in Performing Arts (Theatre and Film Studies) from Paris Nanterre University, followed by a Master's degree in Media and Film Studies from Sorbonne University.

== Filmography ==
=== Movies ===
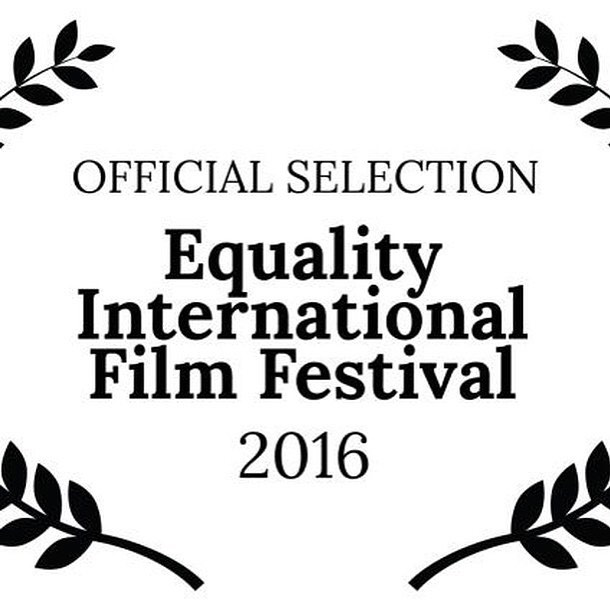
Official Selection Equality International Film Festival, 2016

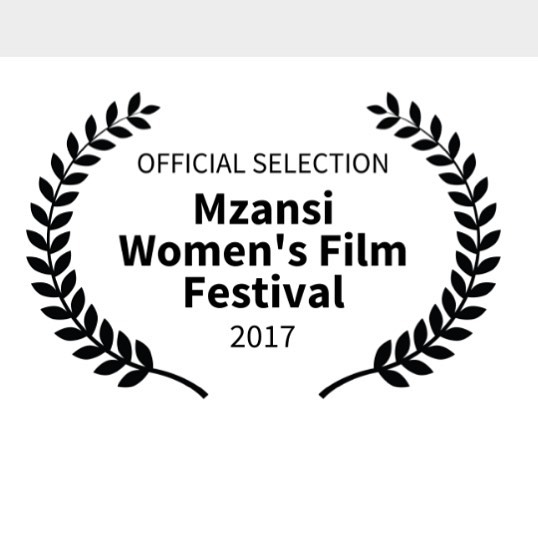
Official Selection Mzansi Women's Film Festival, 2017

Year	Title	Country	Credited as			Notes
Year	Title	Country	Director	Writer	Producer	Notes
2009	Dawn Drumming	Iran	Yes	Yes		
2010	Motherly outsider	Iran	Yes	Yes		
2012	From Liyan to Bushehr	Iran	Yes	Yes		
2013	Swallow	Iran	Yes			
2013	Another way of travelling	Iran	Yes	Yes		
2014	Wishing	Iran	Yes	Yes		
2014	Workers	Iran	Yes	Yes		
2014	Games	Iran	Yes	Yes		
2014	Letters	Iran	Yes	Yes		
2015	One Day in Tehran	Iran	Yes			
2015	Collection Once upon a time in Iran	Iran	Yes	Yes		
2015	My Heritage Singing	Iran	Yes	Yes	Yes	
2016	Giacomo	Italy	Yes			
2016	Series of Iranscape	Iran	Yes			
2017	Taste of refugee	Italy	Yes			
2017	Oriental Experience	Italy	Yes			

== Awards and nominations ==
Year	Ceremony	Category	Nominated Work	Result
2013	Iran International Documentary Film Festival	Chosen film	Swallow	Nominated
2015	Iran International Documentary Film Festival	Best direction	My Heritage Singing	Won
2015	Tehran International Short Film Festival	Best direction	My Heritage Singing	Won
2015	National Parvin Etesami Film Festival	Chosen film	My Heritage Singing	Nominated
2017	Iranian Documentary Independent Award	Best sound recording	My Heritage Singing	Nominated
2017	Iranian Documentary Independent Award	Best direction	My Heritage Singing	Won
2017	International Film Festival	Chosen film	Oriental Experience	Nominated
2018	Rural Film Festival	Movie Juror	Rural Film Festival	
2018	Asia Peace Film Festival	Chosen film	My Heritage Singing	Nominated
