= Fatima Mohamed Dos Santos =

Spanish politician

Fatima Mohamed Dos Santos is a Spanish politician who has represented Ceuta in the Spanish Senate in the XI and XII Legislatures. She is a member of the People's Party.

== Life ==
Born in Barcelona, Mohamed Dos Santos has been a member of the Assembly of Ceuta since 2011 and has served as the Second Vice-President of the Assembly's Board. In 2015, she was elected to the Spanish Senate to represent Ceuta as member of the People's Party; she was re-elected in 2016. She has served as First Secretary to the Equality Commission and member of the Employment and Social Security Commission, the Commission for Integral Disability Policies, and, between 13 September 2016 and 8 November 2017, the Constitutional Commission.
