= Fatimah Baeshen =

Saudi Arabian public figure and writer

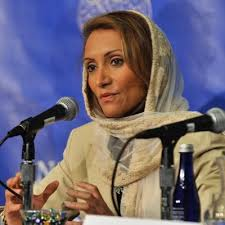
Fatimah S. Baeshen

Fatimah Salem A. Baeshen (Arabic: فاطمة باعشن) is a Saudi-American official who has worked for the Saudi government.

She was spokeswoman for the Embassy of Saudi Arabia in Washington, D.C. from September 26, 2017, to January 23, 2019. Baeshen was the first woman to hold a spokesperson position in the Saudi Arabian government.

== Early life and education ==
Fatimah is of Saudi heritage and was born in the United States in Charleston, South Carolina. She grew up in Oxford, Mississippi, moved to New England for college and then the Midwest. She received a Bachelor of Arts in sociology from the University of Massachusetts Amherst Commonwealth Honors College and a Master of Arts at the Center for Middle Eastern studies (focusing on Islamic finance) from the University of Chicago.

== Career ==
She has lived and worked in New York, Abu Dhabi, Chicago, Amherst, MA, Dubai, Jeddah, Kuala Lumpur, Riyadh, and Washington, D.C. She worked as a consultant and civil servant. In September 2017, Baeshen was appointed Spokesperson for the Embassy of the Kingdom of Saudi Arabia, in Washington, D.C. She was the first woman to hold a spokesperson post for the Saudi government.

She is Founder and Principal of Quantum, a niche international affairs advisory firm focused on facilitating socioeconomic progress.
