= Fatima Deryan =

Lebanese mountaineer

Personal information
- Nationality: Lebanese
- Born: Kuwait City, Kuwait

Climbing career
- Major ascents: First Lebanese woman to summit Mount Everest

Tima Deryan (born Fatima Deryan; Arabic: فاطمة دريان) is a Kuwaiti-born Lebanese mountaineer, who currently lives in Dubai, United Arab Emirates. She is the first Lebanese woman to summit Mount Everest, which she achieved in 2019.

== Biography ==
Deryan was born in Kuwait. Her family moved to Lebanon when she was two, then relocated permanently to Dubai when she was nine.

== Career ==
She announced her plans in early 2019 to summit Mt Everest and began her expedition in March 2019, which was one of her goals of climbing the Seven Summits. Despite living in the UAE, she represented her birth country of Lebanon during the summit. She successfully climbed Mt Everest on 22 May 2019 making her the first Lebanese woman and second person from Lebanon, after Maxime Chaya, to achieve the feat. 2019 was one of the deadliest climbing seasons on Mt Everest, with at least 11 deaths. She was quoted in the New York Times: "It is a question of ethics... You figure out that if you help, you are going to die... it was terrible."

Mt Everest was Deryan's sixth mountain climbed out of seven mountains in different continents as a part of the Seven Summits, which included Denali in North America, Kilimanjaro in Africa, Elbrus in Europe, Puncak Jaya in Oceania and Aconcagua in South America. On 16 December 2022, she completed ski ng to the South Pole.

In October 2019, she also supported and joined the Lebanese demonstrations calling for major economic and political reform in Lebanon. In the same month, she also campaigned under the slogan "Wadi hike" regarding creating awareness about the breast cancer in Dubai.
