= Fatma Uruk =

Turkish world record holder female free-diver

- Born: 1988 (age 37–38); İzmir, Turkey
- Education: Economics
- Alma mater: Middle East Technical University
- Occupation: Free-diver

Fatma Uruk (born in 1988) is a Turkish world record holder female free-diver and school teacher.

== Early life ==
Fatma Uruk was born in İzmir, Turkey in 1988. Between 2006 and 2013, she was educated in Economics at Middle East Technical University in Ankara.

== Sports career ==
She began with freediving after she watched a documentary about the Turkish world-record holder female freediver Yasemin Dalkılıç. In 2008, she felt herself ready for competitions, and participated in the Turkish championship. She won the third place, and was admitted to the national team.

By September 2020, while she was training for a world record freediving in Mexico, she set a new national record in the Constant Weight (CWT) with Fins event with 60 m (200 ft). The old record was 50 m (160 ft). By November the same year, she broke three world records in three days in Mexico. She set a world record in variable weight apnea without fins at sea (VNF) with 72 m (236 ft). The old record was held by Derya Can at 70 m (230 ft). The next day, she broke the world record in the Constant Weight (CWT) with Fins event with 67 m (220 ft), which belonged to Olga Chernyavskaya from Russia at 65 m (213 ft). Finally, she improved her own record in the VNF event to 77 m (253 ft).

== World records ==
- VNF 72 m (236 ft) – 2020
- VNF 77 m (253 ft) – 2020
- CWT 67 m (220 ft) – 2020
