= Fatima Dhiab =

Palestinian Author

- فاطمة ذياب
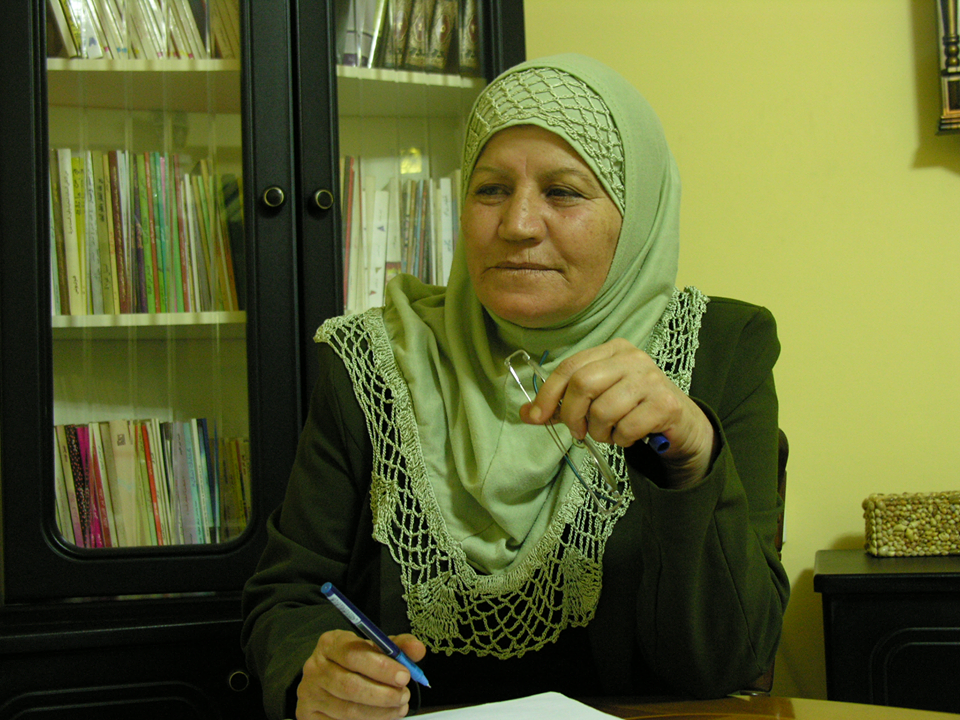
- Born: 1951 (age 74–75)
- Occupations: Novelist, Poet

Fatima Dhiab (Arabic: فاطمة ذياب; born in 1951) is a Palestinian (citizen of Israel) novelist, short story writer, and poet.

== Biography ==
Dhiab was born in Tamra, a village in the Galilee, in 1951. She finished her elementary studies in her hometown and then completed her secondary education in Nazareth.

Her first novel, Journey on a Train of the Past, was published in 1973, in a volume with several short stories. Her play Carry Your Secret won the House of Karma Theater Award in 1978. She also won the Literary Achievement Award, and several honorable mentions and other recognitions of her work.

Dhiab wrote many newspaper and magazine articles, and had regular columns in Al-Sanara and Al-Arab, which, like her literature, addressed women's issues in Arab society She worked as an editor for Lilac magazine.

In the early 1970s, Dhiab was one of very few Arab women writing and being published within Israel. She wrote short stories, novels, children's books, plays, and poetry. Unlike her contemporaries on the other side of the Green Line, Dhiab avoided writing about political and national issues. Some researchers posit that this was due to fear of retaliations by the authorities. In her poetry, however, she did take inspiration from Palestinian nationalist poet Mahmoud Darwish and stressed the importance of time, place, and context, which is nevertheless political. In her writing about women in Arab society, she also wrote about rape, which was considered a taboo subject, and she was targeted by family and strangers alike because of this. It took her almost a decade to return to her writing.

Dorit Gottesfeld, a researcher of Palestinian women's literature, places Dhiab in the "middle generation" of local writers; the first generation laid the groundwork for Palestinian feminist discourse in their romantic-humanistic style, the middle generation adopted realism and sought balance between the social and the national-political, while the current generation uses modernism and post modernism to challenge conventions, both literary and social.

Her works have been included in several collections, including at least one poem set to music, and featured in a festival of Arabic poetry in 2009. Some of her works have been translated into other languages, including Hebrew and English.

== Works ==
- The Repentant Ostrich, Collection of Children's Stories, 1972.
- Journey on the Last Train, novel, 1973.
- Ali Sayyad, A Children's Story, 1982.
- Heart Wound, Thoughts, 1983.
- Mad Fantasy, novella, 1983.
- "Carry Your Secret" and "No Wandering", Two Plays, 1987.
- Women's Case, novel, 1987.
- Ice Days: A Collection of Stories and Thoughts, 1995.
- The Cord and the Crow, novel, 1997.
- Wall of Memories, Literary Texts, 2000.
- City of the Wind, novel.
