= Fatima Ibrahim Shema =

Former first lady of Katsina State (born 1962)

- Born: 1962 (age 63–64); Zaria, Kaduna State
- Citizenship: Nigerian
- Education: B.sc. Degree in Business Administration from Ahmadu Bello University Zaria.
- Title: First Lady of Katsina State 2007 - 2015
- Spouse: Alhaji Ibrahim Shehu Shema
- Children: 4

Fatima Ibrahim Shema (born in 1962) in Zaria, Kaduna State, Nigeria. She was the First Lady and wife to the former Executive Governor of Katsina State, Alhaji Ibrahim Shehu Shema. She is a humanitarian and has often been referred to as the Iron Lady due to her resolute character and intolerance, and she was awarded the Most Valuable Governor's Wife in the North-West award. Fatima has never worked with the government but rather ran personal businesses until becoming the First Lady in 2007.

== Early life and education ==
Fatima was born in Zaria, Kaduna State in the year of 1962. Her educational career started at Ja’afaru Primary School in Sabon Gari Zaria, between year of 1969 and 1974. She was a student at Government Girls Secondary School, Kawo Kaduna State between year of 1971 and 1981. She then joined the famous Katsina College of Arts, Science and Technology between year of 1981 and 1984. She acquired a B.sc. Degree in Business Administration from Ahmadu Bello University Zaria.

== Career ==
She was the First Lady of Katsina State from 2007 to 2015 as wife and immensely supported her husband's political success. She is engaged in personal business of poultry and fish farming. She initiated a foundation for empowering women and children called "Service to Humanity". Fatima was reported to sack a Supervisory Councillor for Water and Sanitation in Matazu Local Government on 27 December 2012.

== Personal life ==
Fatima is the wife to the ex-Executive Governor of Katsina State Alhaji Ibrahim Shehu Shema and they have four children.

== Bibliography ==
- Kabir, Hajara Muhammad, Northern women development. [Nigeria]. ISBN 978-978-906-469-4. OCLC 890820657.
