= Fátima Djarra Sani =

Guinea-Bissau feminist activist

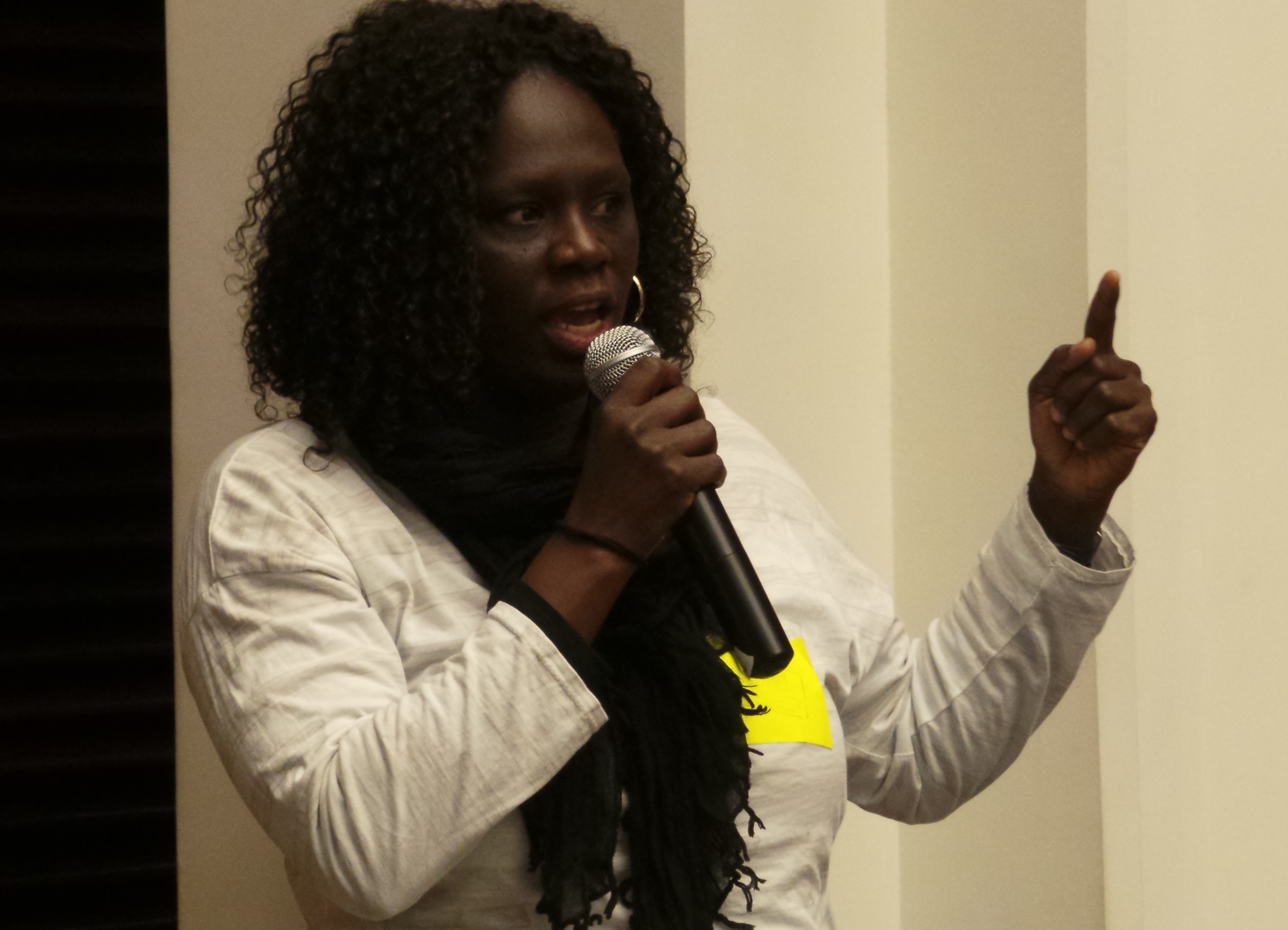
- Sani in 2017
- Born: 1968 (age 57–58); Bissau
- Known for: FGM activism

Fátima Djarra Sani (born 1968) is a Guinea-Bissau feminist activist concerned with visibility of African women and preventing female genital mutilation (FGM).

== Early life ==
Fátima Djarra Sani was born in Bissau, the country's capital, in 1968. She is an activist against the genital mutilation of women in Guinea-Bissau and represents Médecins du Monde in Africa.

Her family comes from the Mandinga ethnic group. She suffered genital mutilation when she was four years old.

== Career ==
In 2008, she joined Médecins du Monde, and has organized workshops and lectures on the visibility of African women, and has been working on projects on sexual reproductive health and the prevention of genital mutilation.

She participated in the drafting of a protocol for the prevention and action against female genital mutilation that was approved in June 2013 in Navarra in Spain.

In 2020 she was part of a team that presented the work that had been done in Navarra in the previous year. Over 200 interventions had been made in Navarra's African community. This included both men and women as there was a growing realisation that men too needed to be persuaded as they can be the power for change.

== Writing ==
In 2015 she published Indomable: de la mutilación a la vida (Indomitable: From Mutilation to Life), with the Ediciones Península Publishing House, an autobiography, in which she tells her life story.

== Publications ==
- Indomable: de la mutilación a la vida (Indomitable: from mutilation to life), Ediciones Península, 2015
