= Fatima Aghamirzayeva =

Azerbaijani businesswoman

Fatima Aghamirzayeva (born January 10, 1953) is a carpet maker and scholar of Azerbaijani weaving. She is one of Azerbaijan's first female business owners, and in 2007 she was nominated for the Secretary of State's Award for International Women of Courage.

== Biography ==
=== Education ===
Fatima Aghamirzayeva enrolled to technical college in 1967 and graduate in 1971. In 1974 was enrolled at Technology faculty of Polytechnic Institution in Makhachkala, Dagestan.

In March 1974 found sewing courses at Guba Teachers House which were consecutively active till 1988. At the same time sewing courses were opened during 3 years in Baku. The lack of teaching materials was the reason of creation "Learn to sew" book by Fatima, which was accepted for government program and was issued by Azerneshr. Later, Fatima writes "Sewing Practice" and "Gözəllik ondur" books which were included into official education program.

=== Entrepreneurship ===
Fatima Aghamirzayeva started as an entrepreneur in 1988 with opening of technical school on dressmaking and carpeting named "AYGÜN". The enterprise was investigating the market, its problems and ways of their solving together with invited specialists from England, Canada, U.S.A. and France. Fatima is the honorable member of such European organizations as "Leader Women" and ERENET, had twice participated in discussions of Geneva Committee on Projects. In 2002 took first place in an "Entrepreneur of a Year" competition among 55 European countries. Fatima is also a member of Turkey-based International Organization KAGİDER. Participant of U.S. and Romania "Foundation of Business Incubations" government programs and TOT training programs. Fatima has represented Azerbaijan carpets at exhibitions in Turkey, Germany and later on in Kuwait and Iran at the same time providing workshops. In 2006 founded World of Carpets Association IB (Xalça Dünyası Assosiasiyası (XDA)) which is currently the official member of UNESCO. WCA is involved in discussion of problems related to carpeting and carpet-makers.
