= Fatma Işık =

Turkish-German footballer

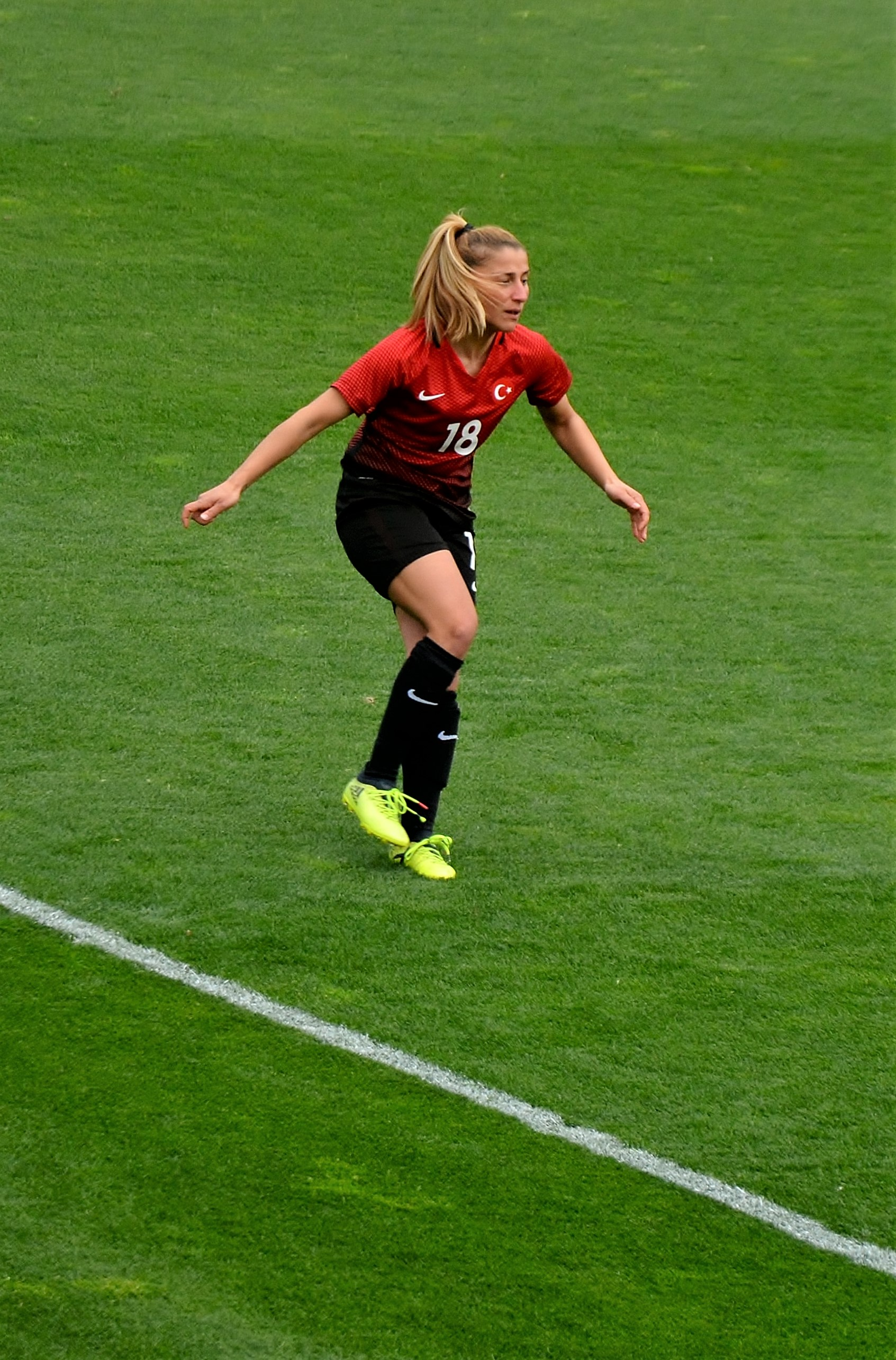
- Işık with Turkey in 2018

Personal information
- Date of birth: 20 April 1991 (age 35)
- Position: Defender

Team information
- Current team: FV Löchgau

Senior career*
Years	Team	Apps	(Gls)
2011–2019	FV Löchgau	56	(0)

International career^{‡}
2017–2019	Turkey	13	(0)
- * Club domestic league appearances and goals ‡ National team caps and goals as of 8 October 2019

Fatma Işık (born 20 April 1991) is a Turkish-German women's football defender currently playing in the German Regional League South for FV Löchgau. She was a member of the Turkish national team.

== Club career ==
Işık played for FV Löchgau (2011–12, 2015–2019) in the German Regional League South.

== International career ==
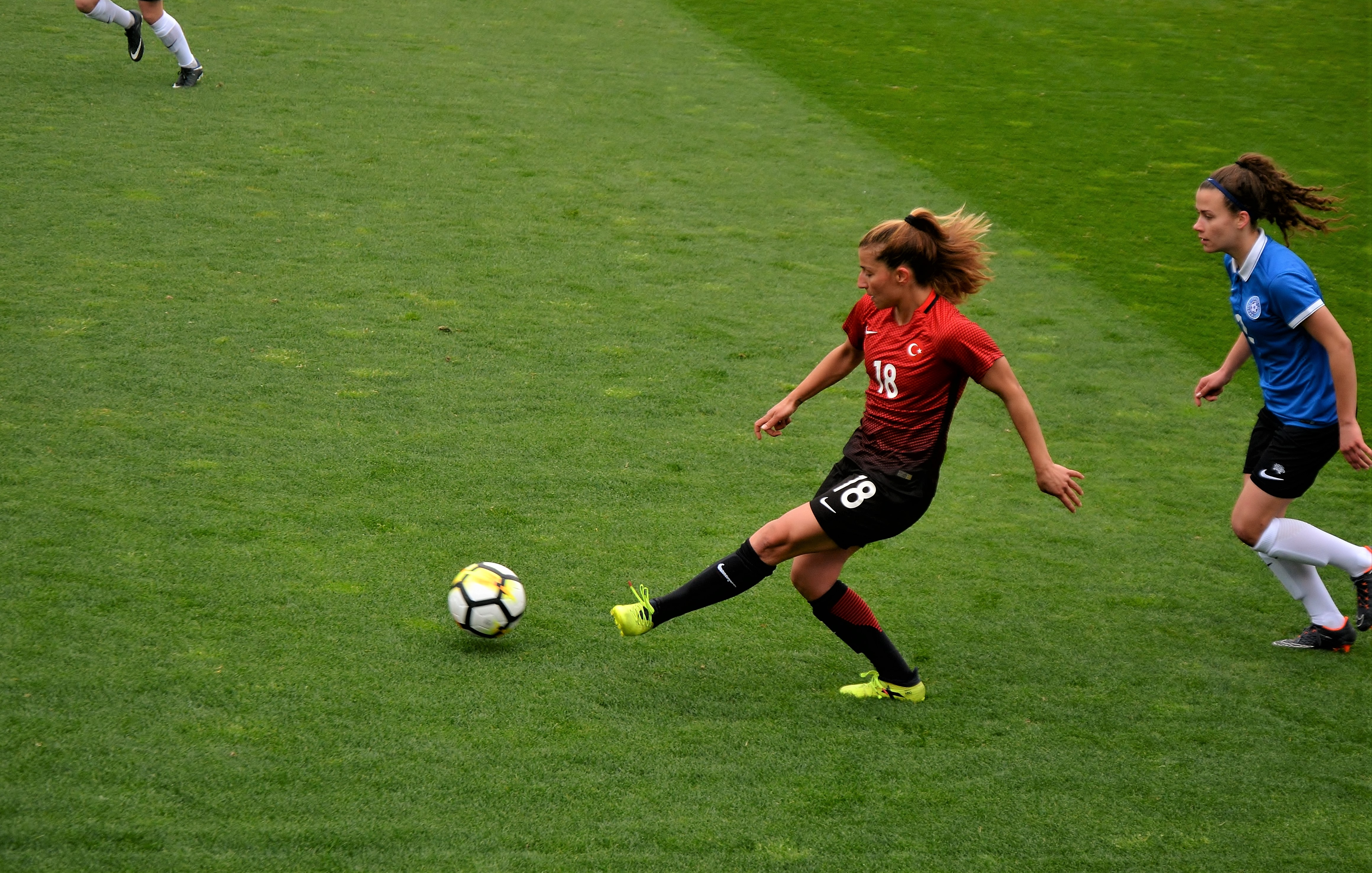
Fatma Işık (red/black) playing for Turkey national in the friendly match against Estonia at TFF Riva Facility on 7 April 2018.

She was admitted to the Turkey women's national football team, and debuted internationally in the 2019 FIFA Women's World Cup qualification – UEFA preliminary round – Group 4 match against Montenegro.
