= Fatemeh Behboudi =

Iranian photojournalist and documentary photographer

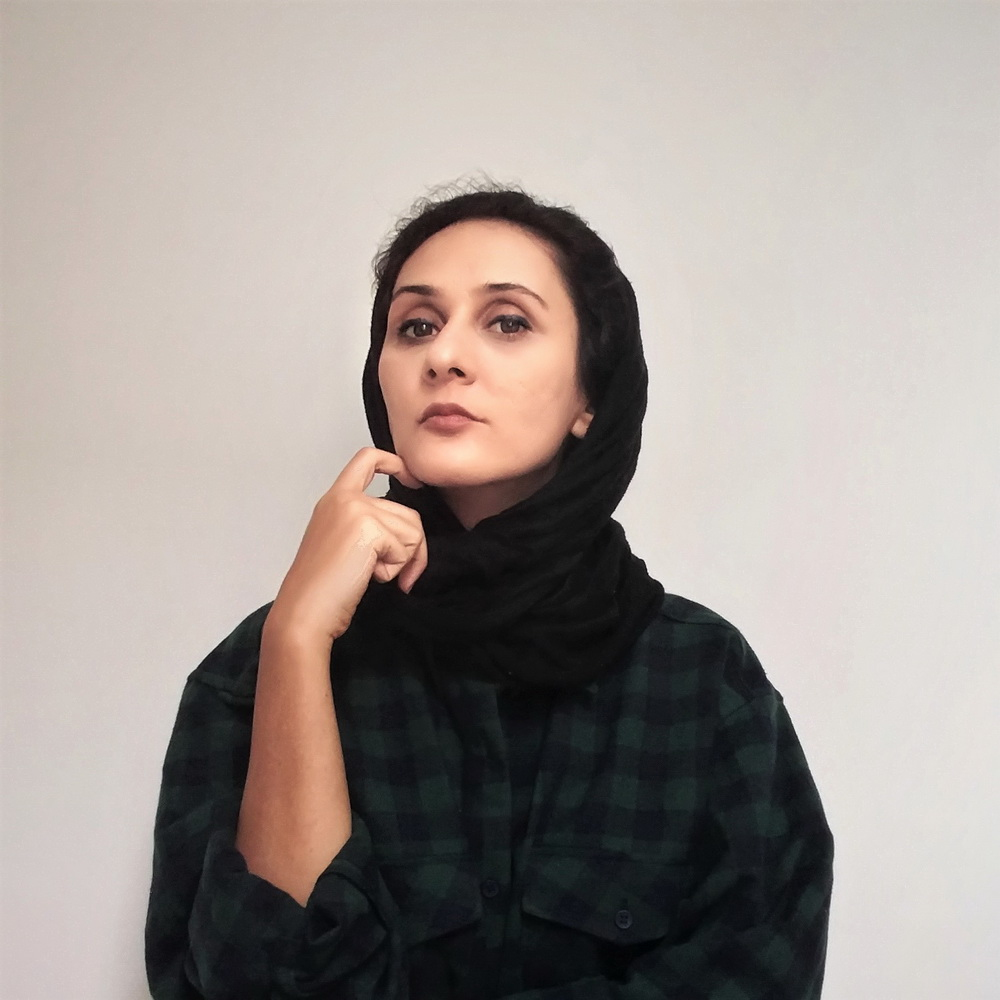
- Born: 1985 (age 40–41); Tehran, Iran
- Occupation: Photojournalist
- Years active: 2007
- Notable credit: World Press Photo 2015 Pictures of the Year International 2014
- Website: fatemehbehboudi.visura.co

Fatemeh Behboudi (Persian: فاطمه بهبودی; born 1985) is an Iranian photojournalist and documentary photographer. She was awarded a World Press Photo award in 2015, a Pictures of the Year International award in 2014, and she is a member of Women Photograph. Fatemeh is the first Iranian woman photographer who won the World Press Photo Award 2015. She is best known for her projects "Mothers of Patience", "The War is Still Alive" "Life After shock" and "One Moment".

== Early life and career ==
Behboudi was born in Tehran during the Iran and Iraq war. All her childhood was spent under the influence of war and its damage, which has become her most important concern in photography. Behboudi, after her childhood spent in a region torn apart by war and conflict, asks through her art why victims of the war could never be the same person again or return to any kind of normalcy. This eerie hypothesis, combined with the death of her best friend prompted her to begin photography.

Behboudi studied photography in the Art Center of Tehran University (2005–2007) and started her professional photography in 2007. She worked for several Iranian news agencies, such as Islamic Republic News Agency, Fars News Agency, Mehr News Agency, Borna, Isca News, Iqna, Jam-e jam newspaper and Donya-e-Eqtesad newspaper. Her main focus in documentary photography is about the victims of the Iran–Iraq war, culture, religion, and natural crises in Iran. In addition to being one of the most vocal photographs in photojournalism and specifically in covering the effects of war on victimized countries, Behboudi is also very passionate about the gender gap in photojournalism. In an interview with Susan Tischendorf, Behboudi stated that "The biggest problems for the female photographers in Iran are gender discrimination in the society and at work, little number of missions, low income, lack of contracts, insurance and appropriate photography opportunities. "Behboudi had a small 'in' to the world of photography, since her father was a photography student as well, but many women do not have the ability to break into the field and thrive.

"Mothers of Patience" is a long-term project that started in 2013 for World Press Photo's Joop Swart Masterclass and continued until 2018. This story is about the Iran-Iraq war and mothers of Iranian soldiers who lost their sons during war and the bodies were never found. Over 10,000 Iranian soldiers were reported missing in action, without a corpse being identified. This story was awarded the World Press Photo 2015 and Pictures of the Year International 2014.

Behboudi's "Mourning for Hossein" project, seen in her "Looking for Freedom" portfolio has also gained much traction as it celebrates a hero of Islamic culture, Hossein the grandson of the great Prophet Mohammed. The images in this project capture the sacred nature of Ashoura Day and the tradition of women covering their faces to mourn for the Martyr, going to 40 places of worship and lighting candles, asking Hossein to be there for them on resurrection day. Behboudi has captured images of this progress to demonstrate the remembrance of a 1337 year old hero who chose to die honorably than to give in to the oppression of Yazid who then ruled over Hossein's people.

In 2014, Behboudi was featured in the Time article "Women in Photography: 34 Voices From Around the World". In 2017 and 2018 she was featured in LensCulture's "Female Photographers to watch". In 2020 Behboudi was selected for the fall semester through the international program of the Danish School of Media and Journalism, Denmark. In 2020, she was selected for Hundred Heroines' "50 Inspiring Women Photographers".

== Some photographs ==
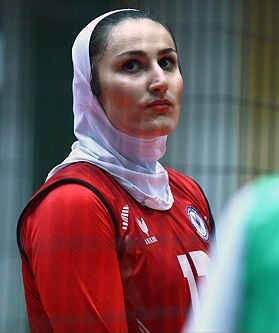
Shekoufeh Safari

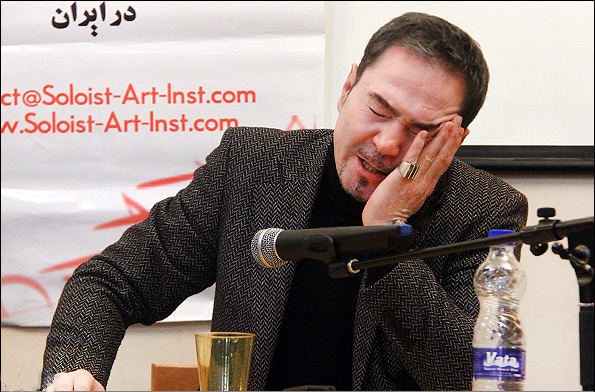
Khashayar Etemadi

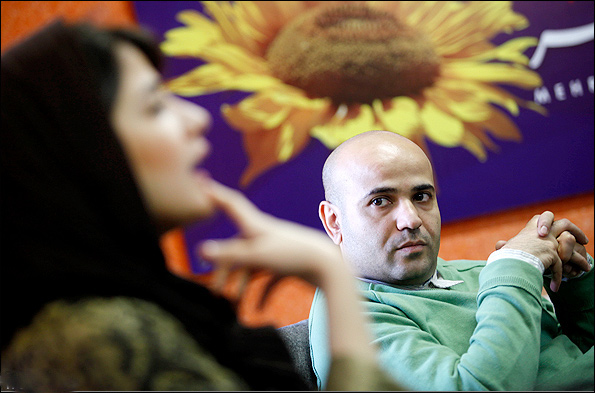
Saeed Changizian

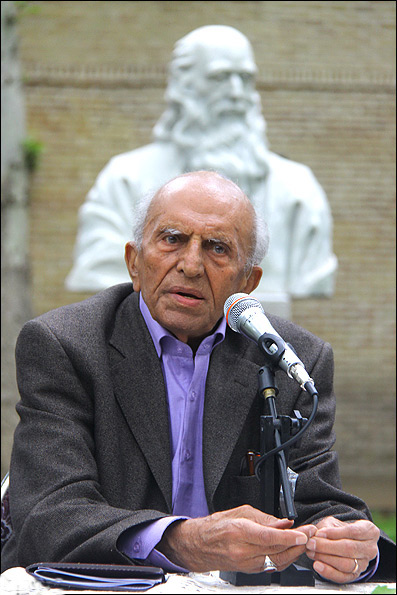
Mohammad Hassan Ganji

== Awards ==
- Joop Swart Masterclass, World Press Photo, 2013
- Pictures of the Year International (POYi), 2014
- World Press Photo award, 2015
- Finalist, Circle of Life contest 12th International Festival of Photojournalism Vilnius Photo Circle 2018, Lithuania
- Finalist, The 2019 Aftermath Grant, USA

== Exhibitions ==
- Obscura's "Asian Women Photographers' Showcase", Malaysia, 2014. One of five exhibited.
- Mothers of Patience, solo exhibition, Deitta Gallery, Yangon, Myanmar, 2015
- Eyes on Main Street: Wilson Outdoor Photo Festival, USA, 2015/16
- Documentary Photography Now, group exhibition, Mills Pond Gallery, Saint James, NY, USA, 2018
- Lumix photo Festival for young photojournalism, Germany, 2018
- International Biennial of Female Photography, Italy, 2022
