= High Institute of Theatrical Arts and Cultural Animation =

- المعهد العالي للفن المسرحي والتنشيط الثقافي
- Type: Public
- Established: 1986
- President: Moussa Rouame
- Director: Latefa Ahrar
- Address: Avenue Allal Fassi Madinat Al Irfane – B.P. 6834, Rabat, Morocco
- Website: https://isadac.ma/

High Institute of Theatrical Arts and Cultural Animation (ISADAC) (Arabic: المعهد العالي للفن المسرحي والتنشيط الثقافي, French: Institut Supérieur d’Art Dramatique et d’Animation Culturelle) is a public Moroccan training institution that prepares students for careers in the arts. It is located in Rabat. Three concentrations are taught: acting, scenography and cultural animation.

== History ==
Placed under the supervision of the Ministry of Culture, Youth and Sports, the institute was created by Decree No. 2.83.706 of 18 January 1985. Since its establishment in 1986, the Institute has played an important role in the development of the arts in general and the development of the stage, cinema, television and radio in particular.

== Admissions ==
Admission to the institute is by competitive examination open to candidates between the ages of 17 and 23 who hold a secondary school diploma or a recognized equivalent. Foreign students can be admitted, within the limits of available places, according to the same conditions.
