= Fatma Moalla =

Tunisian mathematician

Moalla, Fatma
- Born: January 14, 1939 (age 87); Tunis, Tunisia
- Education: Mathematics
- Awards: Agrégation

Fatma Moalla (born January 14, 1939) is a Tunisian mathematician who has published research on Finsler spaces and geometry and worked as an assistant at Faculté des Sciences Mathématique, Physiques et Naturelles. The International Fatma Moalla Award for the Popularization of Mathematics is now given in her honor.

== Biography ==
Fatma Moalla was born in Tunis, Tunisia on January 14, 1939. Her father's name was Mohamed Moalla and he worked selling books. She attended secondary school at Lycée de la Rue du Pacha. In 1956, Moalla switched schools and began attending Lycée Carnot of Tunis where she chose to specialize in mathematics. Moalla then attended university at "Institut des Hautes Études de Tunis...[and] She graduated with her mathematics degree in June 1960." Moalla is the first Tunisian to have been awarded the Agrégation in Mathematics in France in 1961 and the first Tunisian woman to be awarded a doctorate in Mathematics in France in 1965. Later she was placed into the National Union of Tunisian Women.

== Awards and achievements ==
The International Fatma Moalla Award for the Popularization of Mathematics is now given each year in honor of Fatma Moalla.
