= Fatma Sultan =

Fatma Sultan may refer to:

- Fatma Hatun (daughter of Murad II) (1430–?), Ottoman princess
- Sofu Fatma Sultan (daughter of Bayezid II) (1468–?), Ottoman princess
- Hançerli Zeynep Hanzade Fatma Sultan (1495–1533), Ottoman princess
- Fatma Sultan (daughter of Selim I) (1490–1566), Ottoman princess
- Fatma Sultan (daughter of Selim II) (1559–1580), Ottoman princess
- Fatma Sultan (daughter of Murad III) (1573–1620), Ottoman princess
- Fatma Sultan (daughter of Mehmed III) (1584–?), Ottoman princess
- Fatma Sultan (daughter of Ahmed I) (1606–1670), Ottoman princess
- Fatma Sultan (daughter of Ibrahim I) (1642–1657), Ottoman princess
- Fatma Emetullah Sultan (daughter of Mehmed IV) (1679–1700), Ottoman princess
- Fatma Sultan (daughter of Ahmed III) (1704–1733), Ottoman princess
- Fatma Sultan (daughter of Abdulmejid I) (1840–1884), Ottoman princess
- Fatma Sultan (daughter of Murad V) (1879–1932), Ottoman princess
