= Fateme Asadi =

Iranian woman killed in 1984

- Born: 1960; Bagherabad village, Divandarreh, Kurdistan Province, Pahlavi Iran
- Died: 1984 (aged 24)
- Known for: The first Iranian female victim whose missing body was located and recovered after the Iran–Iraq War
- Children: Keshvar Mahmoudi; Baha'oddin Mahmoudi (died when he was 6 months, while his mother was in PDKI custody)

Fateme Asadi (Persian: فاطمه اسدی, romanized: Fāṭmh Asdī; 1960–1984) was an Iranian Kurdish woman who was, according to the Iranian media, tortured and killed by the Democratic Party of Iranian Kurdistan (PDKI). The PDKI denied responsibility and accused the Iranian government of fabricating the report. The PDKI had detained her husband, prompting Asadi to travel to them to obtain his release. She disappeared and her remains were found 37 years later in 2021, identified by a DNA test, and buried in the Chehel Cheshmeh mountains in Divandarreh district. She was labelled a martyr by Iranian media.

== Early life and death ==
Fateme Asadi was born in 1960 in Bagherabad, a village in Divandarreh, Kurdistan Province, Iran. Asadi's husband dug wells for the village of Hosseinabad in Sanandaj at the request of the Islamic Revolutionary Guard Corps (IRGC). The Democratic Party of Iranian Kurdistan (KDPI) accused him of being an IRGC spy. He was held on this pretext and transported by the militia to the Dowlatou prison. The militants asked for 200,000 tomans, which Fateme Asadi collected by selling her belongings. The KDPI militants detained her while she was handing over the money, and they harassed and tortured her for a month before shooting her to death.

Kurdistan Democratic Party of Iran rejected these claims and called them false.

Fateme Asadi's remains were found on 7 November 2021 during explorations in the Chehel Cheshmeh mountains in Divandarreh. DNA analysis was used to determine her identity, the first such use to identify victims of terror in Iran.

=== Funeral ===
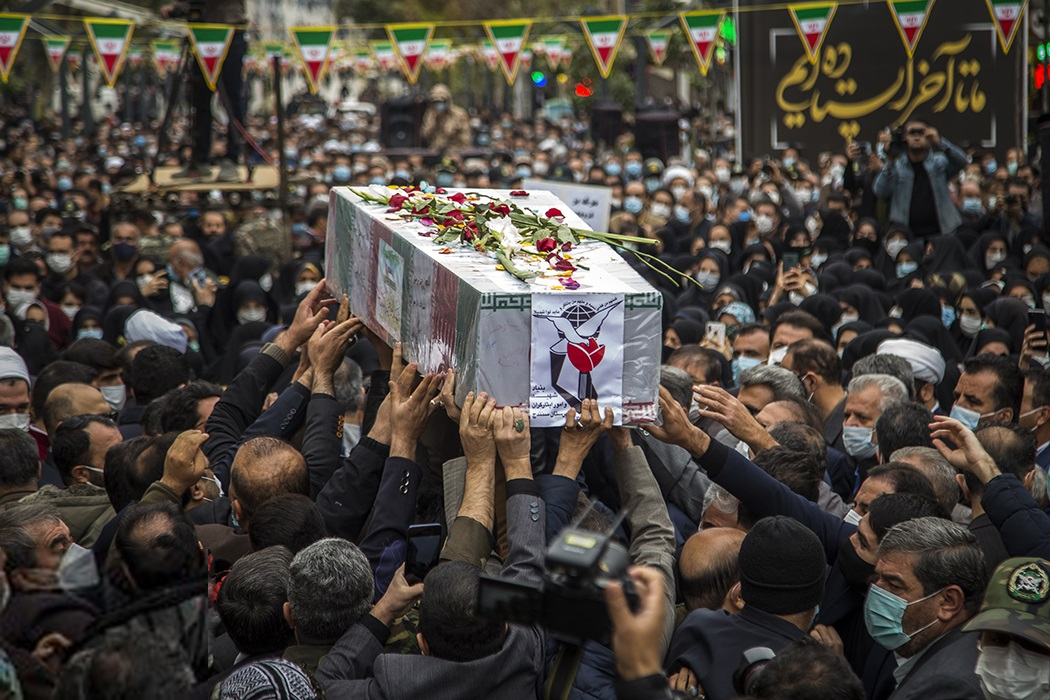
The funeral of Fateme Asadi in Sanandaj, 2021

Asadi's funeral was held at the Imam Reza shrine on 11 November 2021 and at the Fatima Masumeh Shrine the next day. Another funeral was held for her on 16 November 2021, with mourners processing from Azadi Square in Sanandaj to her resting place in Hajar Khatoon Mosque.

== Legacy ==
The Fateme Asadi Award celebrates rural women artists in the fields of performing arts, cinema, visual arts, decorative arts, hand-woven carpets, clothes and music. Rural women writers who have authored or translated books, stories and poetry can also apply for this award. Rural women who are media activists, leaders of rural non-governmental organizations, experts in rural management, sportswomen, or preachers and promoters of Quranic culture are among the other potential recipients of the award.
