= Fátima Campos Ferreira =

Portuguese television presenter and journalist

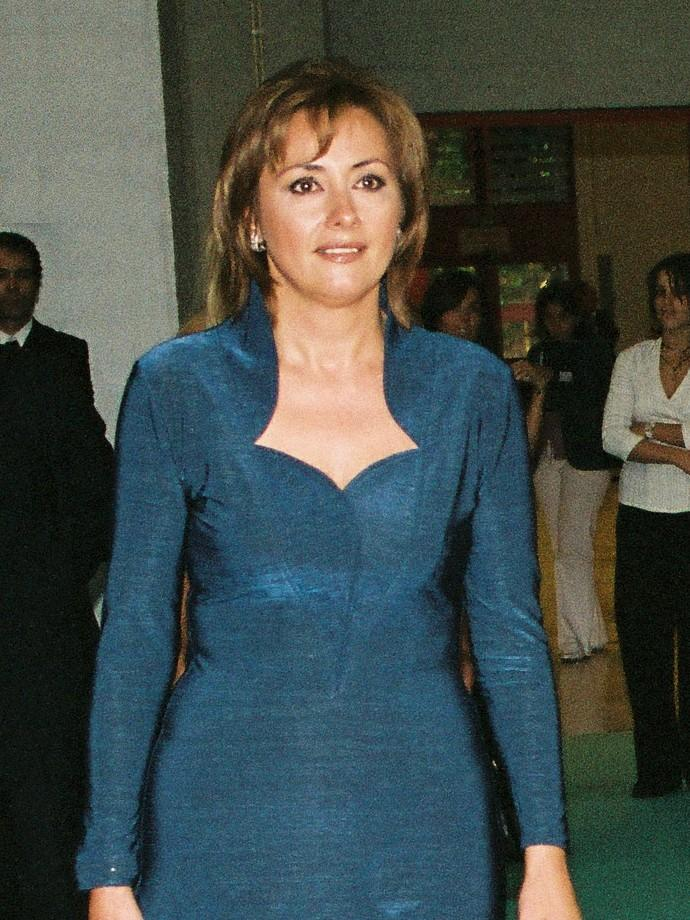
- Born: Maria de Fátima Barbosa Campos Ferreira; 4 April 1958 (age 67); Porto, Portugal
- Occupations: Television presenter, journalist
- Years active: 1987–present
- Spouse: Luís de Matos Lima
- Children: 2

Fátima Campos Ferreira (born April 4, 1958) is a Portuguese television presenter and journalist.

== Life and career ==
Maria de Fátima Barbosa Campos Ferreira was born in Porto, Portugal, in 1958. She studied at the Liceu Nacional Garcia de Orta (high school) in Porto. She was awarded a degree in history by the University of Porto in 1982 and a degree in journalism by the Escola Superior de Jornalismo do Porto in 1986.

She started her television career in 1987, working in Rádio e Televisão de Portugal (RTP). In 1995 she started to host the main news program of RTP, Telejornal. In 2004 she moved to the main news program of RTP 2, Jornal 2. After those works she returned to the RTP 1, the main channel of RTP, to present the weekly debate show Prós e Contras.

== Personal life ==
She married Luís de Matos Lima and had two children: Luís Matos Lima and Joana Matos Lima. She became grandmother of a girl (Joana's daughter) in 2007. She has a brother named Luís Álvaro Campos Ferreira.
