= Fátima Gómez Montero =

Mexican politician

- Born: 13 October 1974 (age 51); Nayarit, Mexico
- Occupation: Politician
- Political party: PRI

Fátima del Sol Gómez Montero (born 13 October 1974) is a Mexican politician from the Institutional Revolutionary Party. In 2012 she served as Deputy of the LXI Legislature of the Mexican Congress representing Nayarit.
