= Fatma Boussaha =

Tunisian Mezwed singer

Fatma Boussaha فاطمة بوساحة
- Born: January 22, 1942; Zaghouan, Tunisia
- Origin: Tunisian
- Died: October 27, 2015 (aged 73) Tunis, Tunisia
- Occupation: Singer

Fatma Boussaha (Arabic: فاطمة بوساحة; 22 January 1942 – 27 October 2015) was a Tunisian Mezwed singer.

== Biography ==
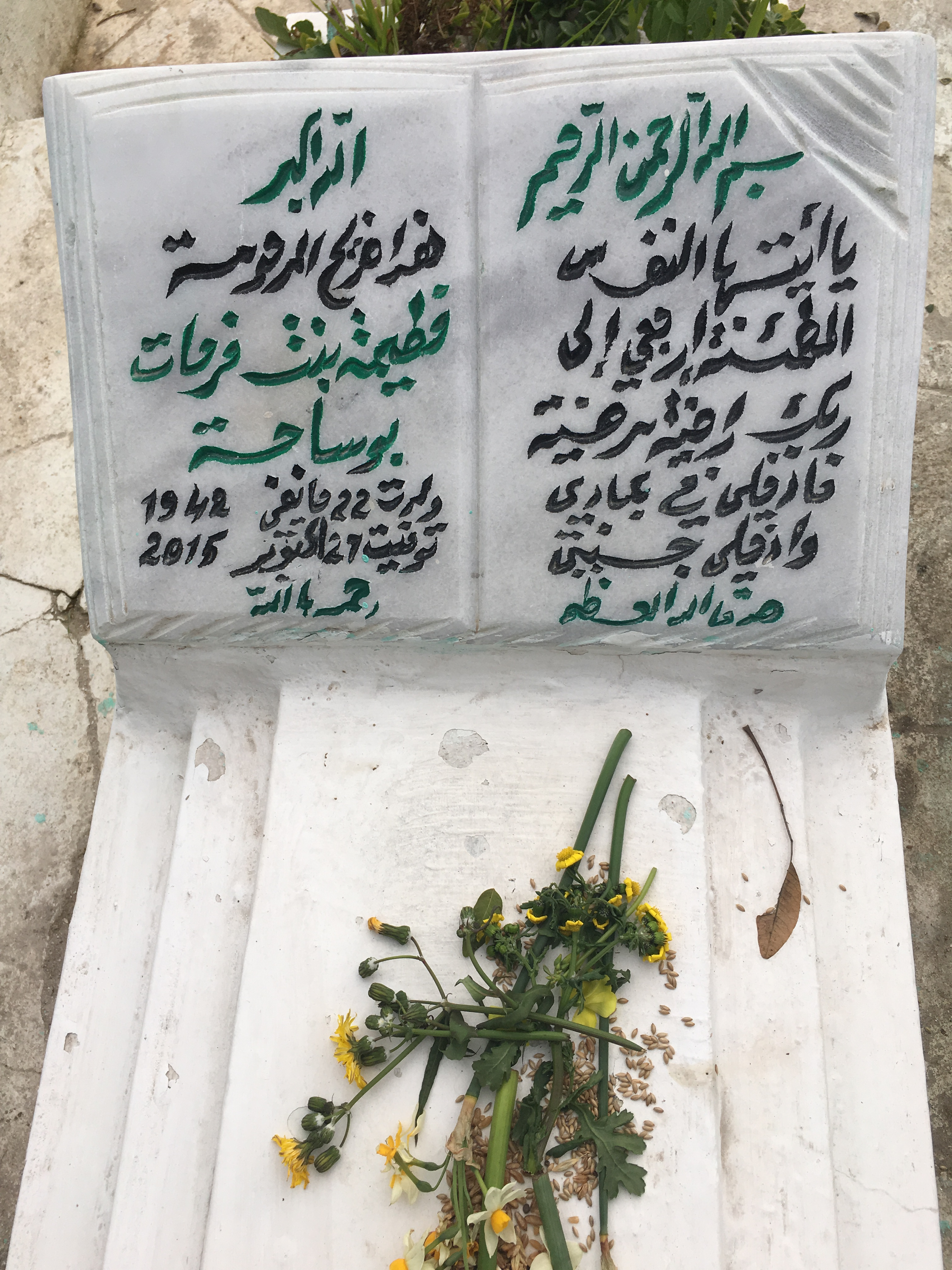
Fatma Bousaha's tomb in the Djellaz cemetery

Fatma Boussaha performed several titles like Ya Ami Echiffour (Hey My Uncle The Driver) and Ya Karhebt Kamel (Hey The Car Of Kamel). She was known for her song Achchibani wassa (Laisse passer le Vieuxard) in 1999. Her last title, Trabek Ghali Ya Touness, (Your Dust Is Precious, Tunisia) dates from 2012. At one time, she was banned from broadcasting on Tunisian television as were other mezoued artists. Boussaha died on Tuesday, October 27, 2015.

At the end of her life, touched by cancer, she found herself alone facing her fight, leading the Ministry of Culture to take charge of her care within the framework of her program of assistance to artists.
