= Fatima Begum (politician, born 1890) =

Pakistani politician

Fatima Begum (11 February 1890 – 1958) was a revered woman of the Pakistan Movement.

== Early life and education ==
She was born to a noble family of Lahore. She was the daughter of Munshi Maulvi Mehboob Alam, who owned the newspaper Paisa Akhbar (Penny Newspaper), famed and named for costing just one paisa (one penny).

Fatima Begum received her early education at home and went on to complete her master's degree from Punjab University. She then became a teacher at Lady Maclagan School.

== Social and political activities ==
In 1909, she was the editor of a fortnightly magazine for women Sharif Bibi. In 1908, the Islamic Association of Women was established. Begum Mian Muhammad Shafi was its first president and Fatima Begum was appointed as its general secretary. In 1921, she was married into a respectable and noble family of Hazara. But after only a few years, her husband died, and she returned to her father's home in Lahore. She was appointed as an honorary Inspector of Mumbai Municipal Corporation.

Soon after that, upon advice from Quaid-e-Azam Muhammad Ali Jinnah, she visited Lahore to raise the status of All-India Muslim League's logo. She was already working for the Ladies Wing of All-India Muslim League, Mumbai. She also used to publish a weekly magazine named Khatun (magazine). This magazine covered religious, social, educational and literary topics. She became active in many social and political organizations including Anjuman-i-Khawatin-i-Islam (Society of Ladies of Islam), the All India Women's Conference and the All-India Muslim League. She used to promote the ideology of Muslim League and Quaid-e-Azam Muhammad Ali Jinnah.

Fatima Begum returned from Bombay to Lahore in 1937 to engage in political activities and public protest. She was very active in the re-awakening of Indian Muslims and creating political awareness among women of Punjab, NWFP and Bihar. She was the founder-principal of the Jinnah Islamia College for Girls at Lahore, British India. Jinnah College for Girls was the prime center of her activities and the main point for Women of Muslim League to confer upon. Every morning, Fatima Begum would address the young women about their responsibilities in the Pakistan Movement.

In 1940, she arranged the annual All-India Muslim League convocation. After doing all this work in Lahore, she decided to go to the North-West Frontier Province. In 1943, she went to Peshawar and started gathering Muslim women under the flag of All-India Muslim League. When there was famine and very poor health conditions in Bengal, she took to action with her companions to distribute food and medicines to the afflicted. In 1946, when there was wide-scale slaughter of Muslims, she went to console and look after the affected families and help the widows and children. Before the Indian provincial elections, 1946, she along with the other eminent Muslim women, campaigned all over Punjab to persuade women to vote for Pakistan. In 1947, after the formation of Pakistan, she worked to rehabilitate the incoming refugees from India. After that she became the provincial president of Muslim League.

== Death and legacy ==
Fatima Begum died in 1958. She had the honor to be the first female Muslim journalist in British India. Muslim women played a significant role before and after the independence of Pakistan. A research paper on Fatima Begum from the Journal of the Research Society of Pakistan pays a tribute to her services by saying, "It can be concluded safely that if less unknown but faithful and selfless workers like Fatima Begum were not available to the Muslim League and the Quaid-e-Azam, creation of Pakistan was a distant task".
