= Fatima Kyari Mohammed =

Nigerian diplomat

- Born: Nigeria
- Citizenship: Nigerian
- Occupations: Diplomat, International civil servant
- Employer: African Union
- Known for: Diplomatic service and leadership roles within the African Union
- Title: Ambassador; Permanent Representative to the African Union

Fatima Kyari Mohammed is a Nigerian diplomat who served as the Permanent Observer of the African Union to the United Nations.

== Education ==
Fatima holds a bachelor's degree in environmental design from the Ahmadu Bello University Nigeria, a Master of Business Administration degree from the European University, a master's degree in sustainable economic development from the United Nations University of Peace, and a Master of Arts degree in peace, security, development and conflict transformation from the University of Innsbruck, Austria.

== Career ==
Prior to her appointment as Permanent Observer of the African Union to the United Nations, Mohammed was a Senior Special Adviser to the Economic Community of West African States (ECOWAS) Commission, with a focus on peace and security, regional integration and organisational development. Before joining ECOWAS, she was the Executive Director at West Africa Conflict and Security Consulting. Earlier, she worked as a programme manager at the European Union Delegation to Nigeria and ECOWAS, and as regional project manager for security policy projects in West Africa.

== Awards ==
- Mohammed was nominated for the Outstanding Woman In Peace Building Award, by NCMG international
