= Fatma Moussa =

Egyptian academic, translator and literary critic

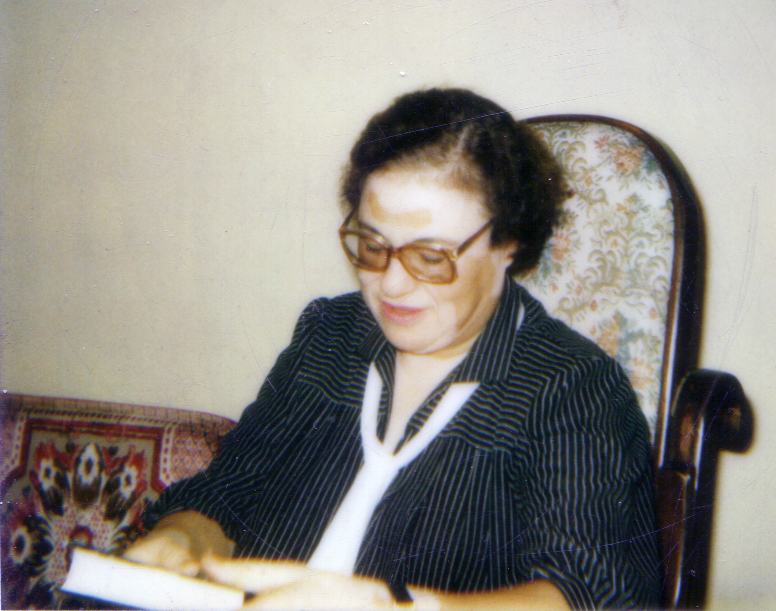
- Born: April 25, 1927
- Died: October 13, 2007 (aged 80)
- Occupations: writer, academic, and translator
- Spouse: Mustafa Soueif

Fatma Moussa Mahmoud (Arabic: فاطمة موسى محمود) (April 25, 1927 – Cairo, October 13, 2007), was an Egyptian academic, translator, and literary critic.

== Life ==
Fatma Moussa got her degree in English Language and Literature, first-class honours, from Fouad I university (now Cairo university) in Cairo in 1948. She obtained her master’s degree in English language and literature from the same university in 1954. Then, she got her PhD in Philosophy of English Language and Literature from Westfield College, University of London, in 1957.

She started her academic career with the impact of ‘Eastern novel’ on European literature in the eighteenth and nineteenth centuries. She frequently quoted from One Thousand and One Nights (Arabic: ألف ليلة وليلة), showing its influence on Western literature. Afterwards, she moved to another academic field, which is the impact of the European novel on the renaissance of the Egyptian novel.

Fatma continued to bridge between the Eastern and Western literature. She wrote studies on the inclusion of one literature in the other side. Moreover, she taught generations of Arab academics to write in this field.

Fatma remained active until her last days. She continued to teach classes for graduate students in Cairo university, supervise doctoral theses, and manage the translation committee of the Supreme Council of Culture.

== Writing and literary criticism ==
As an Arab literary critic, Fatma wrote excessively on both Arabic and European literature. Naguib Mahfouz once said that she is the best critic of his works. One of her most prominent books is The Theatre Dictionary (Qamoos Al-Masrah).

== Translator ==
Fatma translated several plays of Shakespeare such as King Lear, which was performed by the Egyptian National Theatre in 2002. Moreover, she was one of the first to translate Naguib Mahfouz works to English years before he won the Nobel prize. Some consider her translation of Miramar to be the best English translation of Naguib Mahfouz’s novels. Furthermore, she translated some works by her novelist daughter Ahdaf Soueif who writes in English.

== Career ==
Fatma worked as head of the English Department at Cairo University. She also worked as Rapporteur of the Translation Committee of the Supreme Council of Culture, and Chief Executive of the Egyptian Pen Association.

Associations:

- International English Language Teachers in Universities association.
- International Comparative Literature Association.
- The International Shakespeare Association.
- The Modern Language Association.
- The British Society for Middle Eastern Studies.
- The Egyptian Society of Comparative Literature.
- PEN International (the Egyptian branch).
- Supreme Council of Culture.

== Awards ==
- The State Appreciation Award in Literature in 1997.
- Arabic Translators International award in 2007.

== Family ==
Fatma’s husband was Mustafa Soueif, founder of the Department of Psychology at Cairo University. Their eldest daughter Ahdaf is a writer who writes in English. Their middle daughter Laila is a professor of mathematics at Cairo University and a well-known left-wing human rights activist. Their youngest is Ala who is an engineer.

== Death ==
Fatma Moussa died on October 13, 2007.
