= Zoological Society of Pakistan =

- Founded: 3 March 1968; 57 years ago, Dhaka, East Pakistan (now Bangladesh)
- Founder: PAAS
- Type: Non-profit organization
- Headquarters: Lahore
- Website: www.zsp.com.pk

Zoological Society of Pakistan (ZSP) seeks to draw together and serve the interests of all professionals who practice zoology in Pakistan. It was founded in 1968 during the occasion of an annual conference organised by the Pakistan Association for the Advancement of Science.

The organisation seeks to improve and regulate activities "for the advancement of scientific knowledge in Zoology" and promote scientific knowledge of animals through discussions, reports and publications. The body is headed by Prof. Dr. Afzal Kazmi.

At present, the society consists of 327 fellows and 115 life fellows, in addition to 10 honorary fellows. It annually organises the Pakistan Congress of Zoology, and also publishes the Pakistan Journal of Zoology.
