= Fatemeh Moghimi =

Entrepreneur

- Born: 1958 (age 67–68); Rasht, Iran
- Education: City, University of London
- Years active: 1984–present
- Political party: Executives of Construction Party
- Board member of: Tehran chamber of commerce industries Mines and agriculture (TCCIMA)

Seyedeh Fatemeh Moghimi (Persian: سیده فاطمه مقیمی) is an Iranian engineer, entrepreneur and political activist affiliated with the Executives of Construction Party.

She is a founder and CEO of Sadid Bar International Shipping and Transportation Ltd., one of the largest freight forwarder companies in Iran, and the first Iranian women to enter the business in the field. Moghimi is also the first woman to sit in the board of directors of Tehran chamber of commerce industries Mines and agriculture (TCCIMA), being first elected in 2006.

She headed Iran-Georgia joint Commercial Council as of 2015.
