= Fatima Zohra Ardjoune =

Algerian Army general

- Born: Sétif, Algeria
- Education: University of Algiers
- Spouse: Colonel Mohamed Ardjoun
- Military career
- Allegiance: Algeria
- Branch: Algerian People's National Army
- Service years: 1972–
- Rank: General officer
- Commands: Ain Naâdja Military Hospital

Fatima Zohra Ardjoune is an Algerian Army general. She is the first woman in the Arab world to attain this rank. A medical doctor, she pioneered research in the field of hematology in the country in the 1980s. She serves as director-general of the army's central hospital.

== Early life and career ==
Fatima Zohra Ardjoune was born in Sétif and attended an indigenous primary school followed by a girls high school in Kouba. As a child she wanted to help others, and went on to study medicine at the University of Algiers.

Ardjoune joined the People's National Army of Algeria in February 1972. In the 1980s she worked with her husband Mohamed Ardjoun (now a Colonel and director of the army's Blood Transmission Centre) to research blood-borne diseases. The couple were among the first Algerians to carry out research in the field and developed the country's first screening methods at Maillot Hospital.

Ardjoune's doctoral thesis was accepted in 1983 and she was promoted to the rank of commandant (equivalent to major) in 1986. She was appointed a professor in 1991 and promoted to lieutenant colonel.

Ardjoune writes scientific papers on hematology and supervises post-graduate research students at the National School of Military Health, the University of Sciences and Technology Houari Boumediene and at the University of Algiers.

== Army general ==
Ardjoune served as director-general of the Ain Naâdja Military Hospital (where she was previously head of hematology) and was promoted to general rank on 5 July 2009. She is the first Algerian woman and the first woman in the Arab world to attain this rank.

Three further women were promoted to general in the Algerian Army on 13 July 2014 (along with 51 men) and the service has the highest number of female generals of any Arab country.
