= World Network of Biosphere Reserves in Europe and North America =

Under UNESCO's Man and the Biosphere Programme, there are 329 biosphere reserves recognized as part of the World Network of Biosphere Reserves in Europe and North America (as of September 2025). These are distributed across 43 countries in the region.

Biosphere reserves operating under the UNESCO Man and the Biosphere Programme aim to achieve three mandate management objectives of conservation, sustainable socio-economic development, and logistic support.

== Network ==
Below is the list of biosphere reserves in Europe and North America, organized by country/territory, along with the year these were designated as part of the World Network of Biosphere Reserves.

The list does not include the Intercontinental Biosphere Reserve of the Mediterranean, a biosphere reserve shared between Morocco and Spain, which has been classified as part of the Arab States region.

=== Albania ===
- Ohrid-Prespa (2014) (shared with North Macedonia)
- Shkodër (2026) (shared with Montenegro)

=== Andorra ===
- Ordino (2020)

=== Austria ===
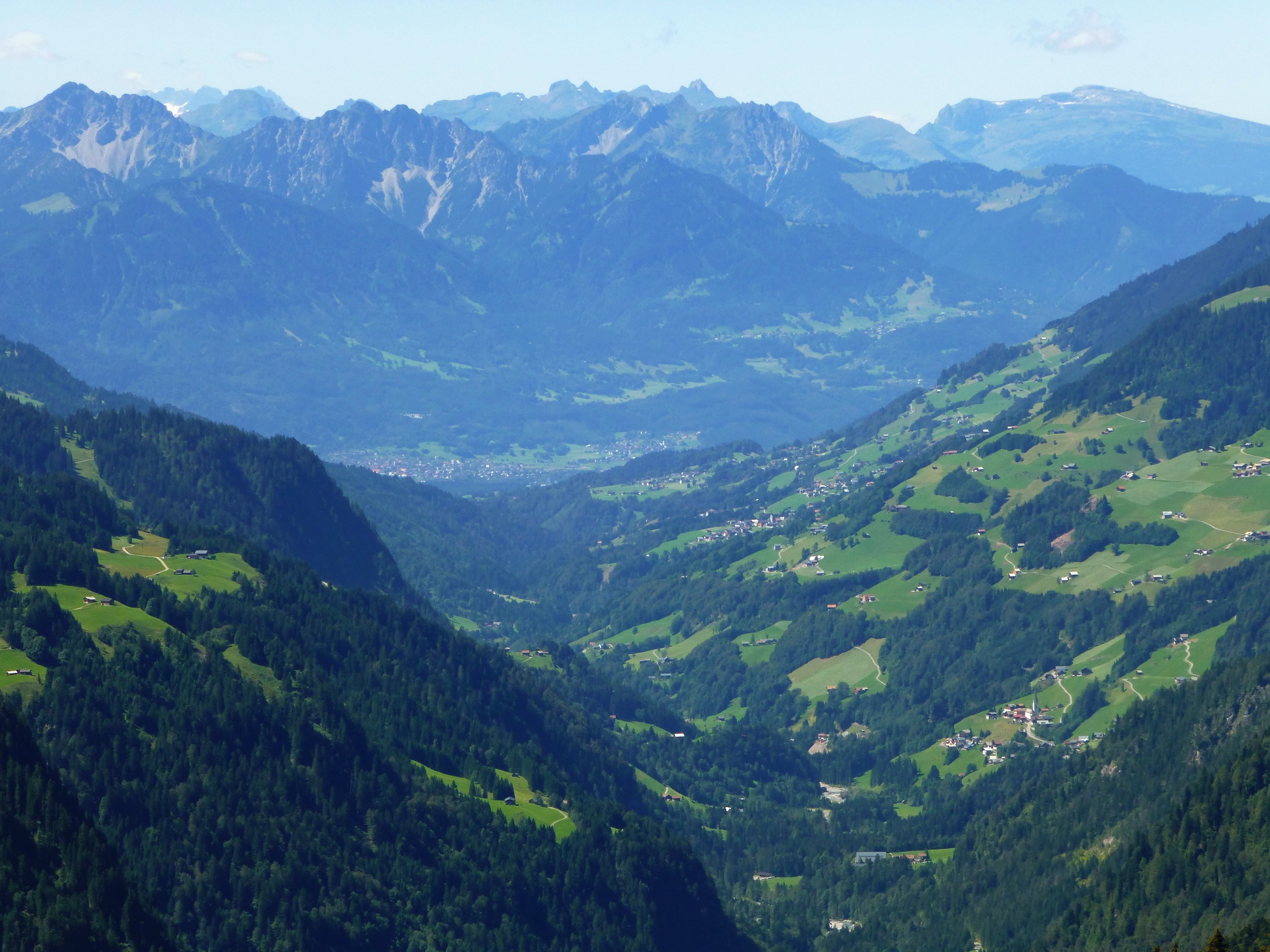
Großwalsertal, Austria

- (Gossenköllesee (1977) - withdrawn in 2014)
- (Gurgler Kamm (1977) - withdrawn in 2014)
- (Lobau (1977) - withdrawn in 2016)
- (Neusiedler See (1977) - withdrawn in 2016)
- Großwalsertal (since 2000)
- Wienerwald (since 2005)
- Salzburger Lungau & Kärntner Nockberge (since 2012)

=== Azerbaijan ===
- Great Caucasus (2026)

=== Belarus ===
- Berezinsky Biosphere Reserve (1978)
- Belovezhskaya Pushcha (1993)
- West Polesie Transboundary Biosphere Reserve (2004)

=== Bulgaria ===
- (Dupkata (1977, withdrawn in 2017))
- (Kamtchia (1977, withdrawn in 2017))
- (Kupena (1977, withdrawn in 2017))
- (Steneto (1977, merged in 2017))
- (Boatin (1977, merged in 2017))
- (Tsarichina (1977, merged in 2017))
- (Dzhendema (1977, merged in 2017))
- Ali Botush (1977)
- Bistrishko Branishte (1977)
- Bayuvi Dupki–Dzhindzhiritsa (1977) (in Pirin National Park)
- Mantaritza (1977)
- Uzunbodzhak (1977)
- Parangalitsa (1977) (in Rila National Park)
- Srebarna (1977)
- Chervenata stena (1977)
- Chuprene (1977)
- Central Balkan National Park (created in 2017 by merging four extant reserves)

=== Canada ===
- Mont Saint-Hilaire (1978)
- Waterton (1979)
- Long Point (1986)
- Riding Mountain (1986)
- Charlevoix (1988)
- Niagara Escarpment (1990)
- Clayoquot Sound (2000)
- Redberry Lake (2000)
- Lac Saint-Pierre (2000)
- Mount Arrowsmith (2000)
- Southwest Nova (2001)
- Frontenac Arch (2002)
- Georgian Bay (2004)
- Manicouagan Uapishka (2007)
- Fundy (2007)
- Bras d'Or Lake (2011)
- Beaver Hills (2016)
- Tsá Tué (2016)
- Howe Sound (2021)
- Québec City (2026)

=== Croatia ===
- Velebit Mountain (1977)
- Mura Drava Danube (2012)

=== Czechia ===
- Krivoklátsko (1977)
- Trebon Basin (1977)
- Sumava (1990)
- Bílé Karpaty (1996)
- Lower Morava (2003)

=== Czechia and Poland ===
- Krkonoše/Karkonosze (1992)

=== Denmark ===
- North-East Greenland (1977)
- Møn (2017)

=== Estonia ===
- West Estonian Archipelago (1990)

=== Finland ===
- North Karelian (1992)
  - Petkeljärvi National Park
  - Patvinsuo National Park
- Archipelago Sea Area (1994)

=== France ===
- Commune de Fakarava (1977)
- Vallée du Fango (1977)
- Camargue (Rhône River Delta) (1977)
- Cévennes (1984)
- Iroise (1988)
- Mont Ventoux (1990)
- Archipel de la Guadeloupe (1992)
- Luberon (1997)
- Forest of Fontainebleau (1998)
- Fontainebleau et du Gatinais (1998)
- Dordogne Watershed (2012)
- Marais Audomarois (2013)
- Gorges du Gardon (2015)

=== France and Germany ===
- Palatinate Forest–North Vosges (1998)

=== France and Italy ===
- Monte Viso (2014)

=== Georgia ===
- Dedoplistskaro (2022)
- Three Alazani Rivers (2022)

=== Germany ===
- Middle Elbe (1979)
- Vessertal-Thuringian Forest (1979)
- Bavarian Forest (1981)
- Berchtesgaden Alps (1990)
- Wadden Sea and Hallig Islands of Schleswig-Holstein (1990)
- Schorfheide-Chorin (1990)
- Spreewald (1991)
- Rügen (1991)
- Rhön (1991)
- Lower Saxon Wadden Sea (1992)
- Hamburg Wadden Sea (1992)
- Upper Lusatian Heath and Pond Landscape (1996)
- Schaalsee (2000)
- Bliesgau (2009)
- Swabian Alb (2009)
- Black Forest (2017)

=== Greece ===
- Gorge of Samaria (1981)
- Mount Olympus (1981)
- Asterousia Mountain Range (2020)

=== Hungary ===
- Aggtelek National Park(1979)
- Hortobágy National Park (1979)
- Kiskunság National Park (1979)
- Pilis (1980)
- Fertő-Hanság National Park (1991) UNESCO Biosphere Reserve since 1979

=== Ireland ===
- North Bull Island (1981)
- Killarney (1982)

=== Israel ===
- Mount Carmel (1996)
- Megiddo (2011)

=== Italy ===
- Collemeluccio-Montedimezzo (1977)
- Circeo (1977)
- Miramare (1979)
- Cilento and Vallo di Diano (1997)
- Somma-Vesuvio and Miglio d'Oro (1997)
- Valle del Ticino (2002), then Ticino Val Grande Verbano (2018)
- Tuscan Islands (2003)
- Selva Pisana (2004)
- Monviso (2013)
- Sila (2014)
- Tepilora, Rio Posada and Montalbo (2017)
- Monte Peglia (2018)
- Valle Camonica - Alto Sebino (2018)
- Alpi Ledrensi e Judicaria (2015)

=== Kazakhstan ===
- Almaty Biosphere Reserve (2020)
- Barsakelmes Biosphere Reserve (2016)
- Katon-Karagay National Park (2014)
- Karatau Nature Reserve (2017)
- West Altai Biosphere Reserve (2020)
- Aksu-Zhabagly Nature Reserve (2015)
- Altyn-Emel National Park (2017)
- Akzhayik Nature Reserve (2014)
- Kolsai Kolderi (2021)
- Zhongar-Alatau National Park (2018)
- Korgalzhyn Nature Reserve (2012)
- Charyn National Park (2018)
- Burabay National Park (2022)
- Alakol Biosphere Reserve (2013)
- Markakol (2022)

=== Latvia ===
- North Vidzeme (1997)

=== Lithuania ===
- Žuvintas (2002)

=== Luxembourg ===
- Minett (2020)

=== Montenegro ===
- Tara River Basin (1976)
- Skadar Lake Watershed (2026) (shared with Albania)

=== Netherlands ===
- Waddensea Area (1986, withdrawn 2018)*
- Maasheggen (2018)
- Aruba Island (2026)

=== North Macedonia ===
- Ohrid-Prespa (2014) (shared with Albania)

=== Norway ===
- Nordhordland (2019)

=== Poland ===
- Babia Góra Massif (1976)
- Białowieża Forest (1976)
- Łuknajno Lake (1976)
- Słowiński (1976)
- Tatra Mountains (1992) (Cross-border with Slovakia)
- Karkonosze (1992) (shared with the Czech Republic)
- East Carpathian (1998) (Cross-border with Slovakia and Ukraine)
- Kampinos Forest (2000)
- West Polesie (2002) (Cross-border with Ukraine and Belarus) (2012)
- Tuchola Forest (2010)

=== Portugal ===
- Paúl do Boquilobo (1981)
- Corvo Island (2007)
- Graciosa Island (2007)
- Flores Island (2009)
- Castro Verde (2017)
- Serra da Estrela (2026)

=== Portugal and Spain ===
- Geres/Xures (2009)
- Meseta Ibérica (2015)

=== Republic of Moldova ===
- Lower Prut (2018)

=== Romania ===
- Pietrosul Mare (1979)
- Retezat (1979)

=== Romania and Ukraine ===
- Danube Delta (1998)

=== Russian Federation ===
- Kavkazskiy (1978)
- Okskiy (1978)
- Prioksko-Terrasnyi (1978)
- Sikhote-Alin (1978)
- Tsentral'no-Chernozemny (1978)
- Nevski Prospekhetee (1984)
- Kronotskiy (1984)
- Laplandskiy (1984)
- Pechoro-Ilychskiy (1984)
- Sayano-Shushenskiy (1984)
- Sokhondinskiy (1984)
- Voronezhskiy (1984)
- Tsentral'nolesnoy (1985)
- Barguzinskyi (1986)
- Baikalskyi (1986)
- Tzentralnosibirskii (1986)
- Chernyje Zemli (1993)
- Taimyrsky (1995)
- Ubsunorskaya Kotlovina (1997)
- Daursky (1997)
- Teberda (1997)
- Katunsky (2000)
- Nerusso-Desnianskoe-Polesie (2001)
- Visimskiy (2001)
- Vodolozerskiy (2001)
- Commander Islands (2002)
- Darvinskiy (2002)
- Nijegorodskoe Zavolje (2002)
- Smolensk Lakeland (2002)
- Ugra (2002)
- Far East Marine (2003)
- Kedrovaya Pad (2004)
- Kenozerskiy (2004)
- Valdaisky (2004)
- Khankaiskiy (2005)
- Middle Volga Integrated Biosphere Reserve (2006)
- Great Volzhsko-Kamsky (2007)
- Rostovsky (2008)
- Altaisky (2009)
- Kizlyar Bay (2017)
- Metsola (2017)
- Great Altai (2017)(encompassing Katun Nature Reserve in Russia and Katon-Karagay National Park in Kazakhstan)

=== Serbia ===
- Golija-Studenica (2001)
- Bačko Podunavlje (2017)

=== Slovakia ===
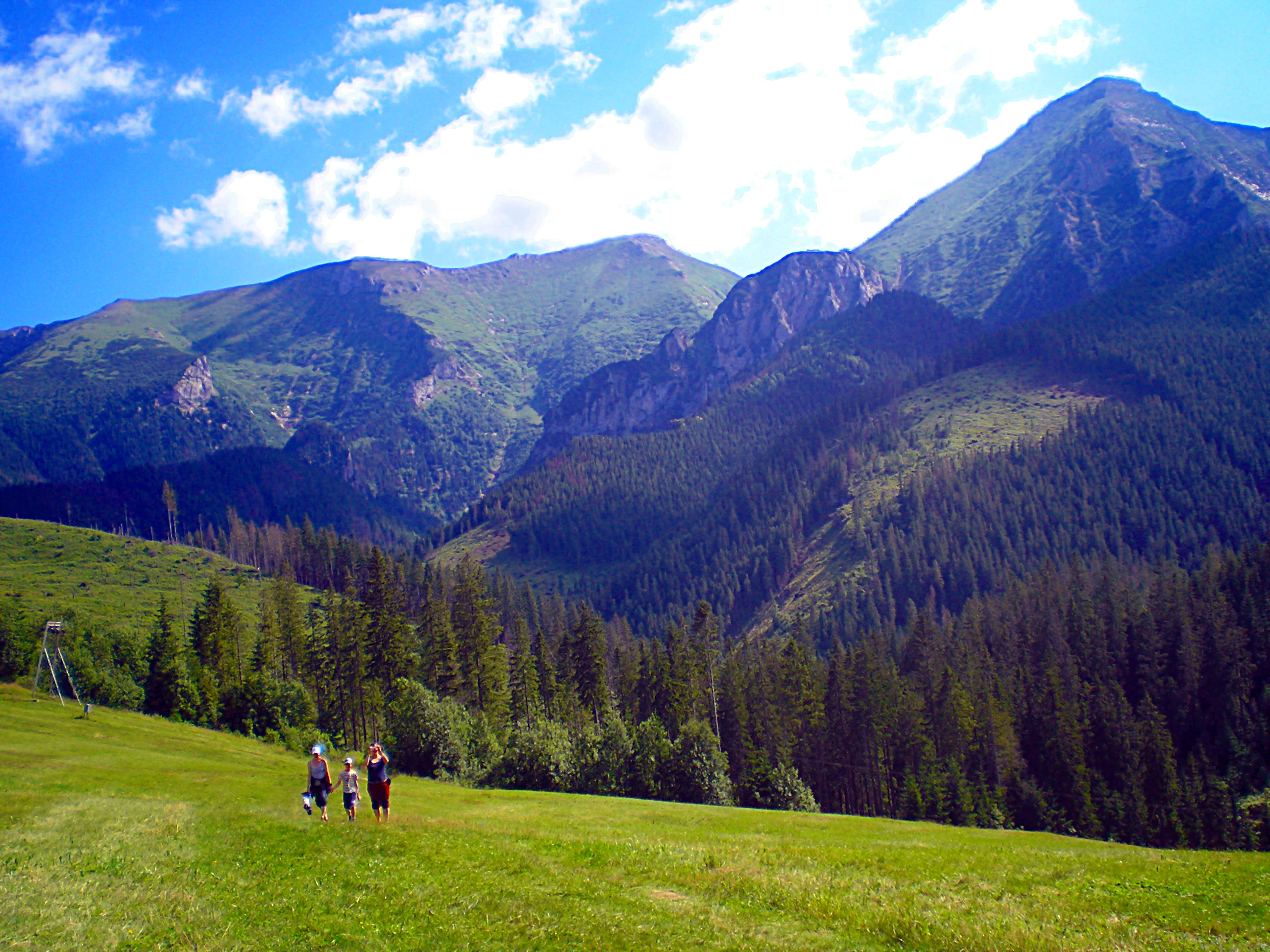
Tatra Mountains, Slovakia

- Slovenský Kras (1977)
- Poľana (1990)
- Tatra Mountains (1992) (Cross-border with Poland)
- East Carpathian (1998) (Cross-border with Slovakia and Ukraine)

=== Slovenia ===
- Julian Alps (2003)
- The Karst (2004)
- Kozjansko & Obsotelje (2010)
- Mura (2018)

=== Spain ===
- Grazalema (1977)
- Ordesa-Viñamala (1977)
- Montseny Natural Park (1978)
- Doñana (1980)
- Mancha Húmeda (1980)
- Las Sierras de Cazorla y Segura (1983)
- Marismas del Odiel (1983)
- La Palma (1983)
- Urdaibai (1984)
- Sierra Nevada (1986)
- Cuenca Alta del Río Manzanares (1992)
- Lanzarote (1993)
- Menorca (1993)
- Sierra de las Nieves y su Entomo (1995)
- Cabo de Gata-Nijar (1997)
- Isla de El Hierro (2000)
- Bardenas Reales (2000)
- Muniellos, Gran Cantábrica (2000)
- Somiedo (2000)
- Redes (2001)
- Las Dehesas de Sierra Morena (2002)
- Terras do Miño (2002)
- Valle de Laciana (2003)
- Picos de Europa (2003)
- Monfragüe (2003)
- Valles del Jubera, Leza, Cidacos y Alhama (2003)
- Babia (2004)
- Alto de Bernesga (2005)
- Los Valles de Omaña y Luna (2005)
- Los Argüellos (2005)
- Área de Allariz (2005)
- Gran Canaria (2005)
- Sierra del Rincón (2005)
- Os Ancares Lucenses e Montes de Cervantes (2006)
- Los Ancares Leoneses (2006)
- Las Sierras de Béjar y Francia (2006)
- Río Eo, Oscos e Terras de Buron (2007)
- Fuerteventura (2009)
- As Mariñas Coruñesas e Terras do Mandeo (2013)
- Terres de l'Ebre (2013)
- Real Sitio de San Ildefonso-El Espinar (2013)
- Macizo de Anaga (2015)
- Ponga (2018)
- Ribeira Sacra e Serras do Oribio e Courel (2021)

=== Sweden ===
- (Lake Torne Area (1986) - withdrawn in 2010)
- Kristianstads Vattenrike Biosphere Reserve (2005)
- Lake Vänern Archipelago (2010)
- Blekinge archipelago (2011)
- River Landscape of Nedre Dalälven (2011)
- East Vättern Scarp Landscape (2012)
- Voxnadalen (2019)
- Vindelälven-Juhttátahkka (2019)

=== Switzerland ===
- Swiss National Park (1979)
- Entlebuch Biosphere (2001)
- Biosfera Val Müstair (2010)

=== Türkiye ===
- Camili (2005)

=== Ukraine ===
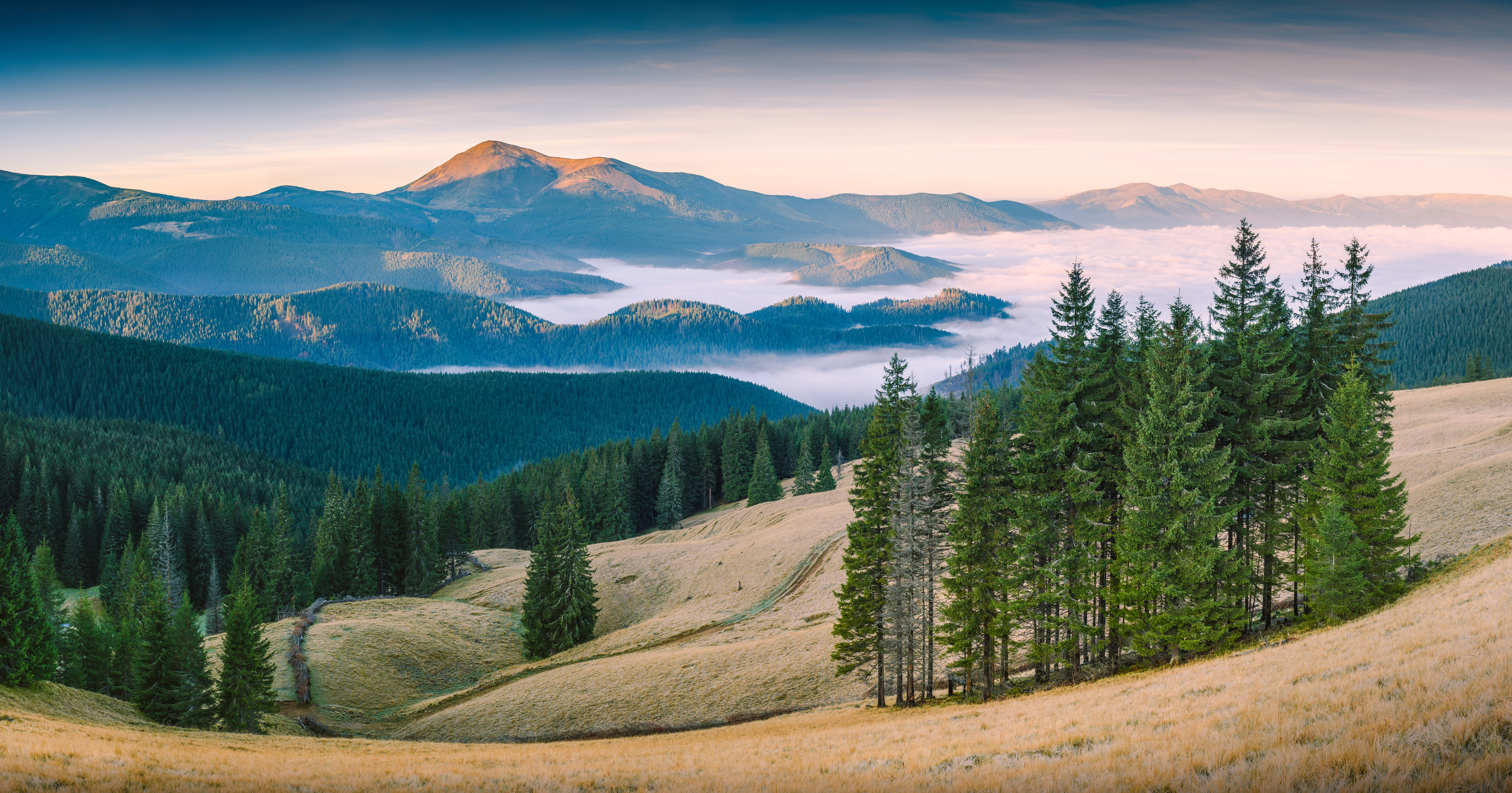
Carpathian Biosphere Reserve, Ukraine

- Chernomorskiy (1984)
- Askaniya-Nova (1985)
- Carpathian (1992)
- East Carpathian (1998) (Cross-border with Slovakia and Ukraine)
- Shatskiy (2002)
- Desnianskyi (2009)
- Roztochya (2011)

=== United Kingdom ===
- Beinn Eighe (1976)
- Braunton Burrows (1976), extended 2002 as North Devon's Biosphere Reserve
- Cairnsmore of Fleet (1976)
- Biosffer Dyfi (1976)
- Isle of Man (2016) - entire territory and territorial seas
- Isle of Wight (2019) - entire landmass, plus inshore waters and surrounding English Channel
- (Loch Druidibeg (1976) - withdrawn 2013)
- (Moor House-Upper Teesdale (1976) - withdrawn 2012)
- (North Norfolk Coast (1976) - withdrawn 2014)
- Silver Flowe-Merrick Kells (1976)
- (Taynish (1977) - withdrawn 2010)
- Galloway and southern Ayrshire (2012)
- Brighton and Lewes Downs (2014)
- Wester Ross (2016)

=== United States ===
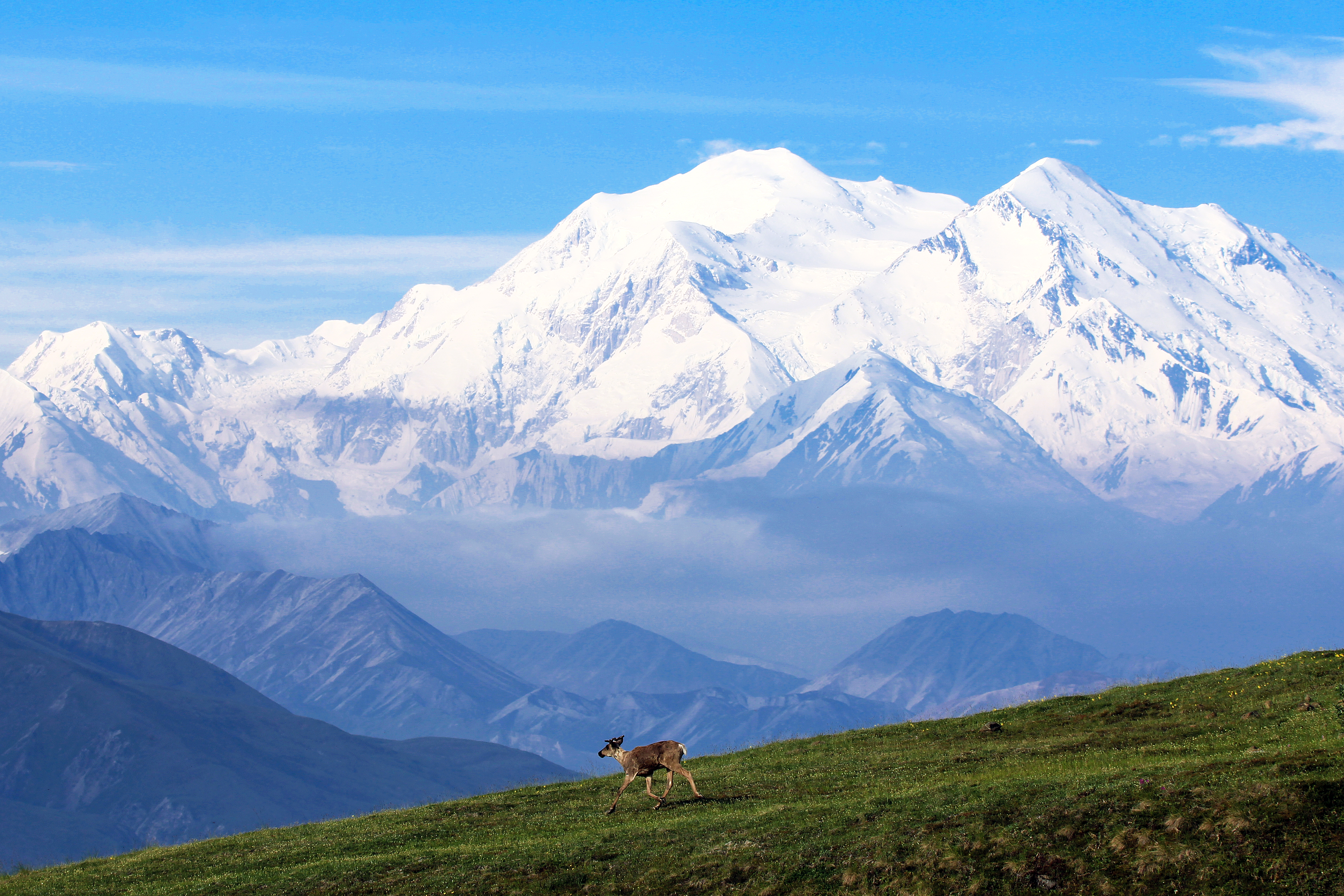
Denali National Park and Preserve, Alaska

The US Biosphere Network (USBN) consists of 28 internationally recognized biosphere regions across the continental United States, the US Caribbean, Alaska, and Hawai’i. In 2021, the USBN adopted the term biosphere regions instead of biosphere reserves. The mission of the USBN is to foster national and international connections among biosphere regions, to facilitate their sharing of best practices, and to support their work toward connecting people and nature.

- Big Bend (1976)
- Cascade Head (1976)
- Channel Islands (1976)
- Denali (1976)
- Everglades & Dry Tortugas (1976)
- Crown of the Continent (formerly Glacier) (1976)
- Jornada (1976)
- Luquillo (1976)
- Olympic (1976)
- Sonoran Desert (formerly Organ Pipe Cactus) (1976)
- Rocky Mountain (1976)
- Sequoia-Kings Canyon (1976)
- Yellowstone-Grand Teton (formerly Yellowstone) (1976)
- Obtawaing (formerly University of Michigan Biological Station) (1979)
- Virginia Coast (1979)
- Hawaiian Islands (1980)
- Isle Royale (1980)
- Big Thicket (1981)
- Guanica (1981)
- Apalachicola (formerly Central Gulf Coast Plain) (1983)
- Congaree (formerly South Atlantic Coastal Plain) (1983)
- Mojave and Colorado Deserts (1984)
- Glacier Bay-Admiralty Island (1986)
- Golden Gate (1988)
- New Jersey Pinelands (1988)
- Southern Appalachian (1988)
- Champlain-Adirondack (1989)
- Mammoth Cave Area (1990)

Sites withdrawn

- (Aleutian Islands (1976–2017))
- (Beaver Creek (1976–2017))
- (California Coast Ranges (1983–2017))
- (Carolinian-South Atlantic (1986–2017))
- (Central Plains (1976–2017))
- (Coram (1976–2017))
- (Desert (1976–2017))
- (Fraser (1976–2017))
- (H.J. Andrews (1976–2017))
- (Hubbard Brook (1976–2017))
- (Konza Prairie (1978))
- (Land Between the Lakes (1991–2017))
- (Niwot Ridge (1979–2017))
- (Noatak (1976–2017))
- (San Dimas (1976–2018))
- (San Joaquin (1976-2019))
- (Stanislaus-Tuolumne (1976–2017))
- (Three Sisters (1976–2017))
- (Virgin Islands (1976–2017))
