= Long Point =

Long Point may refer to:

== Antarctica ==
- Long Point (South Georgia), on Barff Peninsula, South Georgia Island

== Australia ==
- Long Point, New South Wales, a suburb of Sydney

== Canada ==
- Long Point, Ontario, a sand spit projecting into Lake Erie in Ontario
  - Long Point Biosphere Reserve, a United Nations designated area of 40,600 ha (terrestrial and marine)
  - Long Point National Wildlife Area, a 3,650 ha National Wildlife Area in Canada
  - Long Point Provincial Park, an Ontario Provincial Park of 150 ha
- Long Point, Nova Scotia, a community along the shore of St. George's Bay
- Long Point (Manitoba), a continuation of The Pas Moraine near the Saskatchewan River

== United States ==
- Long Point, Illinois, a village
- Long Point, Iowa, an unincorporated community
- Long Point, Michigan, an unincorporated community
- Longpoint, Texas, an unincorporated community in Washington County
- Long Point, Texas, a ghost town in Fort Bend County
- Long Point (Cape Cod), a spit that extends into Cape Cod Bay, in Provincetown, Massachusetts
  - Long Point Light, the historic lighthouse at the tip of Cape Cod

== See also ==
- Long Point State Park
- Longue pointe (disambiguation) (French: Long Point)
- Point (disambiguation)
- Long (disambiguation)
