= Gornje Podunavlje =

Protected wetland area in the northwest of Serbia

- Serbian Cyrillic: Горње Подунавље
- IUCN category IV (habitat/species management area)
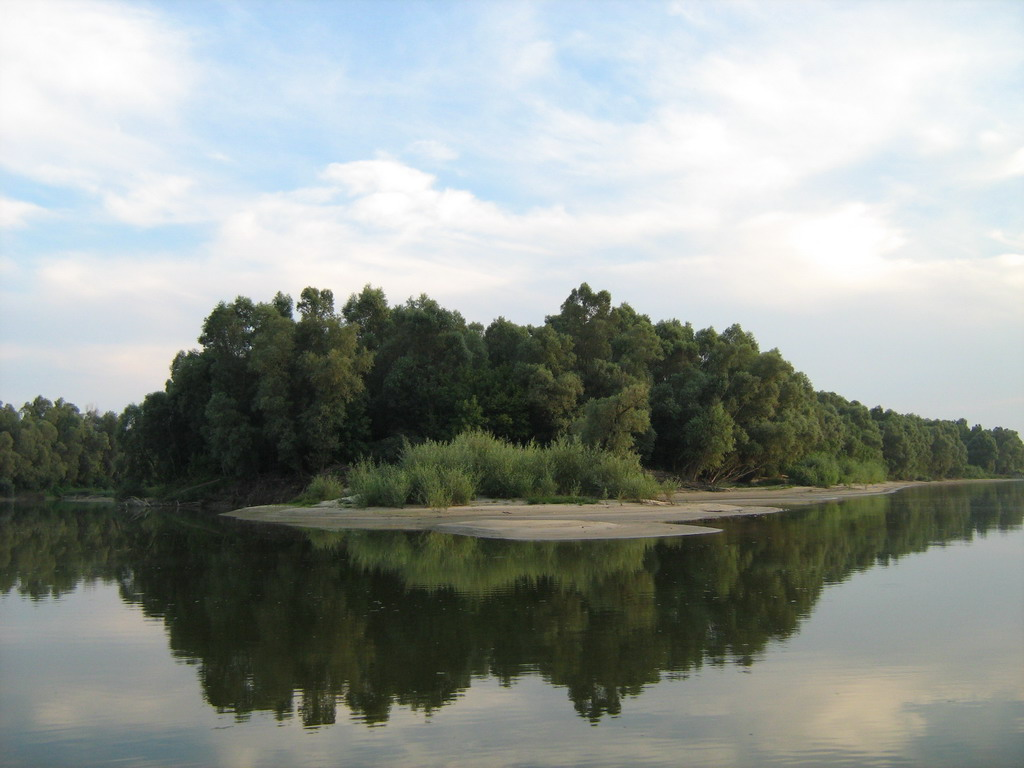
- Gornje Podunavlje near Apatin

- Location within Serbia
- Location: Apatin, Sombor and Odžaci, Vojvodina, Serbia
- Nearest city: Sombor
- Coordinates: 45°45′50″N 18°55′34″E
- Area: 196.48 km^{2} (75.86 sq mi)
- Established: 1955; 2001
- Website: www.gornjepodunavlje.net

Ramsar Wetland
- Designated: 13 November 2007
- Reference no.: 1737

Gornje Podunavlje Special Nature Reserve (Serbian: Специјални резерват природе Горње Подунавље / Specijalni rezervat prirode Gornje Podunavlje) is a large protected area of wetland in the northwest of Serbia (Vojvodina province), on the Danube's left bank. It comprises two large marshes, Monoštorski Rit and Apatinski Rit and vast forests, meadows, ponds, swamps and the Danube's meanders, including 66 km (41 mi) of the Danube course (1366–1433 km). It is a part of the trans-boundary biosphere reserve "Mura-Drava-Danube", a five country project, dubbed the "Amazon of Europe".

The name means "Upper Danube Valley". Parts of the nature reserve are subject to the Croatia–Serbia border dispute; Croatia claims some areas under Serbian control on the eastern side of the river.

== Protection ==
=== Background ===
In the past 200 years, the amelioration of the area, especially the draining of the marshes, reduced once vastly spread wetland ecosystems in the Pannonian Basin to several patches along the major rivers. During that period, the rivers in the Bačka region were turned into the canals. Obsolete ideas of turning the natural streams into canals without gravel or sand in their beds was done allegedly for better sailing and floods prevention. However, in time dozens of plant and animal species disappeared and even the human population was affected by this process: fish catch diminished and underground waters, used for drinking, were not being purified through the soil anymore.

=== Establishment ===
The first designation as a protected area dates back to 1955, when an area of 10 square kilometres (3.9 sq mi) was proposed as an important habitat for the white-tailed eagle and the black stork. Since then, the area included and the level of protection has been gradually increased. Gornje Podunavlje was designated as a special nature reserve in 2001, with a total size of 19,648 ha (48,550 acres).

=== Level of protection ===
Within the reserve, there is a three-level zonation system established: protection regimes of category I (1.3%), II (24.7%) and III (74.0%). There is a huge biodiversity of Gornje Podunavlje Reserve. More than 150 bird species occur regularly in the reserve, amongst which a lot of threatened ones. It is an area of important aquatic and semi-aquatic vegetation, wet meadows and native lowland forests composed of willow, poplar, ash and oak trees. The area is rich in fish species, as one of the most important spawning areas along the Danube.

A project "Partnership for the living Danube" was established in 2007. Within the scopes of the project, 37 ha (91 acres) of Gornje Podunavlje's wetlands were revitalized. A new method of removing the wooden and shrub vegetation, which suffocated the life in and around the ponds of Sarkanj and Semenjača, was implemented. A mosaic of natural habitats (wet meadows-saline marshes-water "mirrors") was restored. Floating plant colonies were also restored and regenerated: yellow iris, common duckweed, reed, European white water lily, yellow water-lily, common cattail and sedge. They soon became the nesting place for many wading birds. Some birds, absent from the area for over a century, returned. In 2017 works on revitalization of the marsh Široki Rit began, on an area of 53 ha (130 acres) while the Štrbac locality is scheduled to be next.

Gornje Podunavlje is also declared an Important Bird Area, Important Plant Area, Prime Butterfly Area, part of the Emerald network and a Ramsar wetland.

=== Trans-boundary Biosphere Reserve ===
Gornje Podunavlje is part of the vast Central Danube Floodplains, the large trans-boundary floodplain in the middle Danube, along the route of the southern European Green Belt. It is one of the best preserved wetlands in the Danube River Basin area. In 2009, the preliminary bilateral agreement between Croatia and Hungary was reached on creating a joint natural reserve in the Drava-Danube region. In March 2011, corresponding ecology ministries from five countries (Austria, Slovenia, Croatia, Hungary, Serbia) agreed on creating a Trans-boundary Biosphere Reserve of Mura-Drava-Danube which would consist of more than 700 square kilometres (270 sq mi) of the core zone (already protected areas), 2,300 square kilometres (890 sq mi) of buffer zones and 7,000 square kilometres (2,700 sq mi) of transitional zones. It should include the already protected areas: Kopački rit, Veliki Pažut, Mura-Drava (in Croatia), Danube-Drava National Park (in Hungary), Gornje Podunavlje, Karađorđevo, Tikvara (in Serbia) and several Natura 2000 protected areas in Austria, Slovenia and Hungary. With 10,000 square kilometres (3,900 sq mi) in total, it would be among the largest protected terrestrial areas in Europe, hence it was named the "Amazon of Europe – Mura-Drava-Danube". In June 2016 UNESCO officially designated the reserve and in September 2016 five ministers opened the reserve and agreed on future cooperation and joint management. That management will include the administration of the river ecosystems in sustainable way, renewal and protection of the natural wetlands and biodiversity, taking care of the drinking water, spurring of the economic development: organic production, tourism and protection of the diverse cultural heritage in each of the countries.

=== UNESCO Biosphere Reserve ===
The reserve was officially designated UNESCO Biosphere Reserve on 14 June 2017 under the title "Bačko Podunavlje". Podunavlje is the second UNESCO Biosphere Reserve in Serbia after Golija-Studenica, designated in 2001.

== Wildlife ==
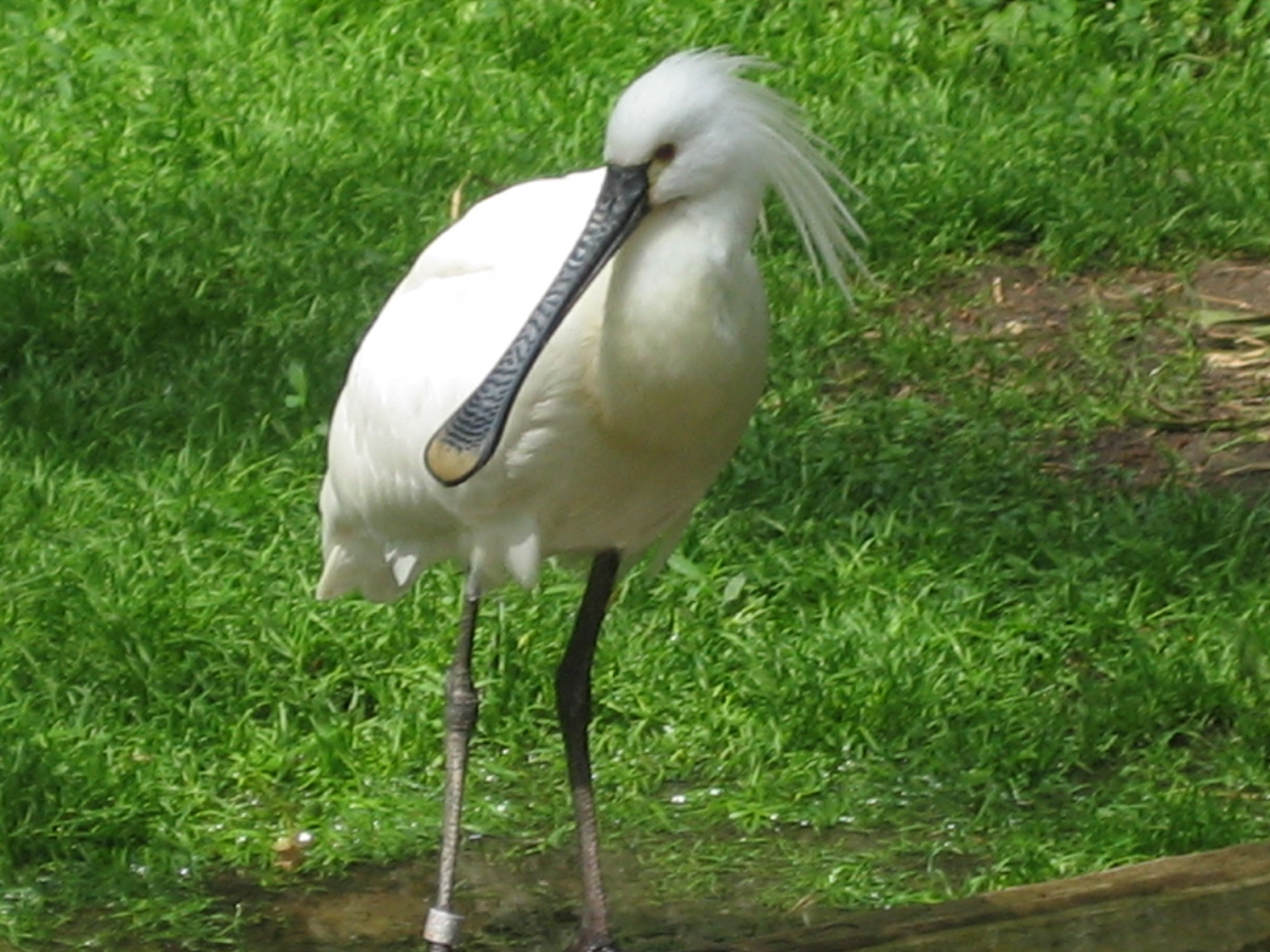
Eurasian spoonbill

As one of the last integral floodplains of the Danube, it contains some of the most valuable wetland habitats and therefore is a sanctuary for many species, which with their lifecycles, is inherently connected to the river.

=== Plant life ===
Natural poplar, oak and willow forests and occasionally flooded wet meadows or numerous oxbow lakes and swamps, which were once widespread in the Danube wetlands, are today rare and fragmented habitats. Trees growing in Gornje Podunavlje also include ash while the reserve is also inhabited by the plants like violet limodore, yellow iris, European white water lily, sweet flag, yellow water-lily winter aconite, sedge, common duckweed, water violet, reed, common cattail and common mare's-tail. Number of plant species in the reserve, over 1,000, makes one third of all plant species in Serbia.

=== Animal life ===
The reserve is home to 20 species of amphibians and reptiles and a numerous invertebrates, including over 60 species of butterflies. Gornje Podunavlje is a habitat of numerous fish species which find ideal spawning conditions in the oxbows and shallow shoals of the emanated river, including the critically endangered species of bastard sturgeon. The area is home to some important species such as white-tailed eagle (Haliaeetus albicilla) or black stork (Ciconia nigra), but also to ferruginous duck and Eurasian spoonbill. A total of 248 species of birds live in the reserve, or 71% of all bird species in Serbia (349). Also, it is populated by the rare and endangered mammals like European otter (Lutra lutra) and wild cat (Felis silvestris). Other mammals include European badger and red deer. Half of the species of fish (50 out of 98) and mammals (50 out of 95 or 101, depending on the source) registered in Serbia, can be found in the reserve. Although suffers a certain pressure from numerous human activities, this area still remains an unspoiled natural environment for the many species which inhabit it.
