= Biosphere Reserves of Canada =

Location of Biosphere Reserves in Canada

UNESCO Biosphere Reserves are environment-protected scientific-research institutions of international status that are created with the intent for conservation in a natural state the most typical natural complexes of biosphere, conducting background ecological monitoring, studying of the surrounding natural environment, its changes under the activity of anthropogenic factors.

Biosphere Preserves are created on the base of nature preserves or national parks including to their composition territories and objects of other categories of nature-preserving fund and other lands as well as including in the established order the World Network of Biosphere Reserves in the UNESCO framework "Man and the Biosphere Programme".

== List of Biosphere Reserves ==
Canada's 18 UNESCO Biosphere Reserves encompassing a total area of 235,000 square kilometres (91,000 sq mi).

Name	Photo	Location	Established	Area (ha)	Description	Ref
Beaver Hills		Alberta	2016	159,560		
Bras d'Or Lake		Nova Scotia	2011	356,788	Protects the estuarine system of Bras d'Or Lake	
Charlevoix		Quebec	1988	1,290,000		
Clayoquot Sound		British Columbia	2000	349,947	Protects an intact coastal forest ecosystem on the west coast of Vancouver Island.	
Frontenac Arch		Ontario	2002	220,973		
Fundy		New Brunswick	2007	432,310		
Georgian Bay		Ontario	2004	347,270		
Lac Saint-Pierre		Quebec	2000	650,490		
Long Point		Ontario	1986	40,600		
Manicouagan-Uapishka		Quebec	2007	5,480,000		
Mont Saint-Hilaire		Quebec	1978	1,100		
Mount Arrowsmith		British Columbia	2000	118,592		
Niagara Escarpment		Ontario	1990	194,555		
Redberry Lake		Saskatchewan	2000	112,200		
Riding Mountain		Manitoba	1986	1,331,000	Encompasses Riding Mountain National Park and twelve surrounding municipalities.	
Southwest Nova		Nova Scotia	2001	1,546,374		
Tsá Tué		Northwest Territories	2016	9,331,300		
Waterton		Alberta	1979	66,761	Encompasses Waterton Lakes National Park and two surrounding municipalities.	

== See also ==
- Wildlife of Canada
- List of World Heritage Sites in Canada
