= Manicouagan =

Manicouagan may refer to the following in Quebec, Canada:

- Manicouagan Reservoir, a lake formed by an impact crater
- Manicouagan Regional County Municipality
- Manicouagan River
- Manicouagan (electoral district)
- Manicouagan Uapishka Biosphere Reserve
