= Longue-Pointe (disambiguation) =

Longue-Pointe is a former village, now a neighbourhood, in Montreal, Quebec, Canada.

Longue Pointe or Longue-Pointe may also refer to:

- CFB Longue-Pointe, a Canadian Armed Forces military base in Longue-Pointe, Mercier, Montreal, Quebec, Canada
- Longue-Pointe-de-Mingan (since 1997), a municipality in Minganie, Cote-Nord, Quebec, Canada; on the Gulf of Saint-Lawrence; formerly named "Longue-Pointe" (1966–1997)
- Longue Pointe, Chisasibi, Quebec, a peninsula on James Bay
- Longue Pointe peninsula, Lake Evans (Quebec), Canada; in the James Bay district, northern Quebec
- Parish of Longue-Pointe, a former civil parish on Montreal Island, Quebec, Canada; the eastern portion of the island, now part of the city of Montreal; see 20th-century municipal history of Quebec
- Longue-Pointe Division, a 19th-century military unit of Quebec militia that are now part of the Canadian Army regiment Fusiliers Mont-Royal
- 822 Longue-Pointe shuttle, a Montreal bus service; see List of STM bus routes

== See also ==
- Battle of Longue-Pointe (1775), a battle on Montreal Island, Quebec, Canada; during the American War of Independence
- Beaurivage-de-la-Longue-Pointe Village, Longue-Pointe Parish, Montreal Island, Quebec, Canada; see List of former municipalities in Quebec
- Long Point (disambiguation) (French: Longue Pointe)
