= Lower Prut =

Nature reserve in Moldova

Coordinates: 45°42′N 28°11′E

- Rezervația științifică Prutul de Jos
- IUCN category Ia (strict nature reserve)
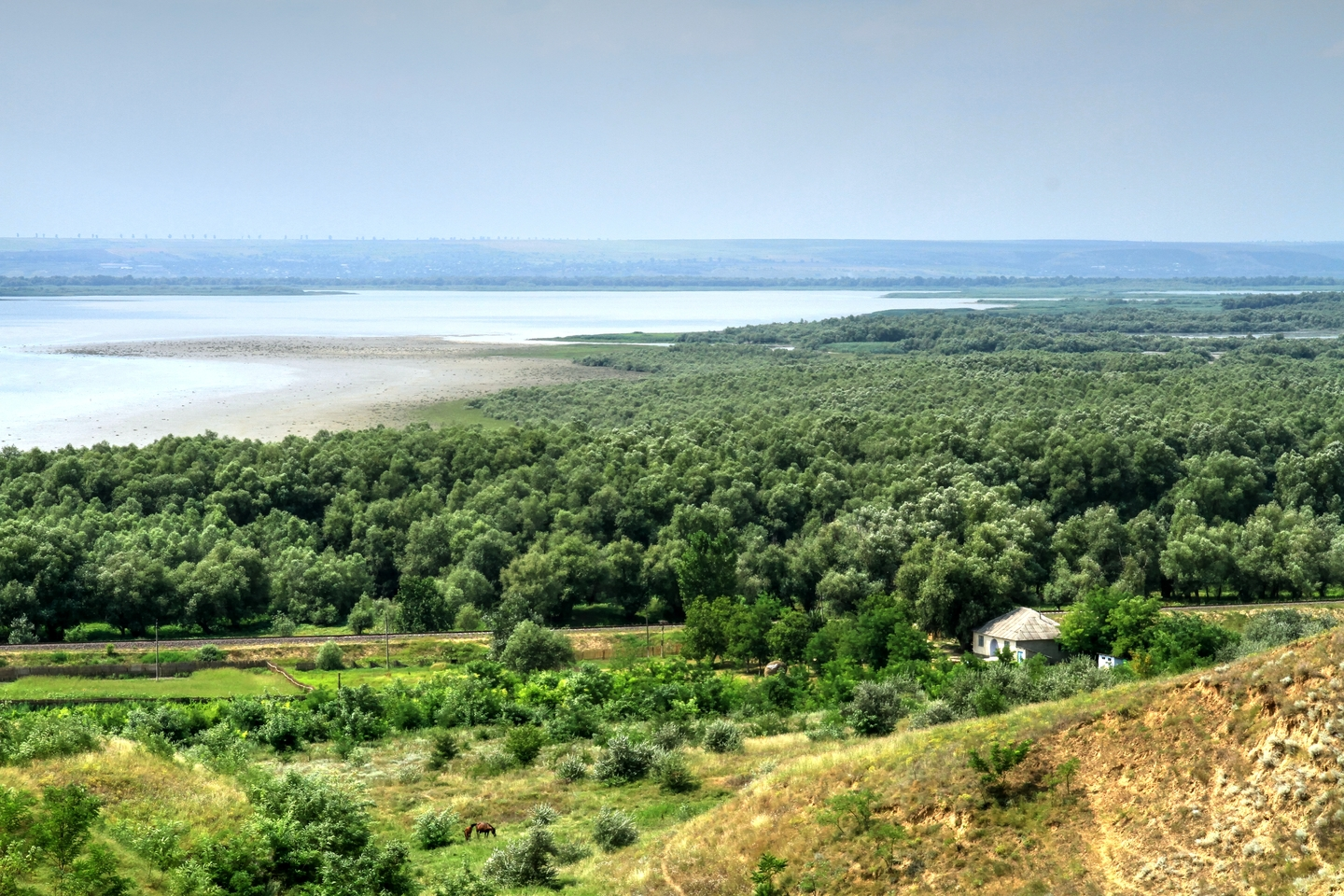
- Location: Raionul Cahul, Moldova
- Area: 1,691 hectares (16.91 km^{2})
- Established: 1991

Lower Prut (Romanian: Rezervația Prutul de Jos) is a scientific Reserve in Cahul District, Moldova and was founded on April 23, 1991. It covers an area of 1,691 ha (4,180 acres; 16.91 km^{2}). It was created in order to preserve and study the ecosystem of lakes and floodplain landscape of the lower course of the River Prut, to create favorable conditions for the reproduction of rare and endangered species of plants and animals.

== Lake Beleu ==
The avifauna of Prutul de Jos is represented by more than 196 species, of which 45 species are included in the Red Book of Moldova and are taken under international protection. On the lake, depending on the season, can be spotted herons, cormorants, gulls, ducks, geese, swans, terns, cormorants, as well as colonies of hundreds or even thousands of pelicans. The site has been designated an Important Bird Area (IBA) by BirdLife International.

== Gallery ==
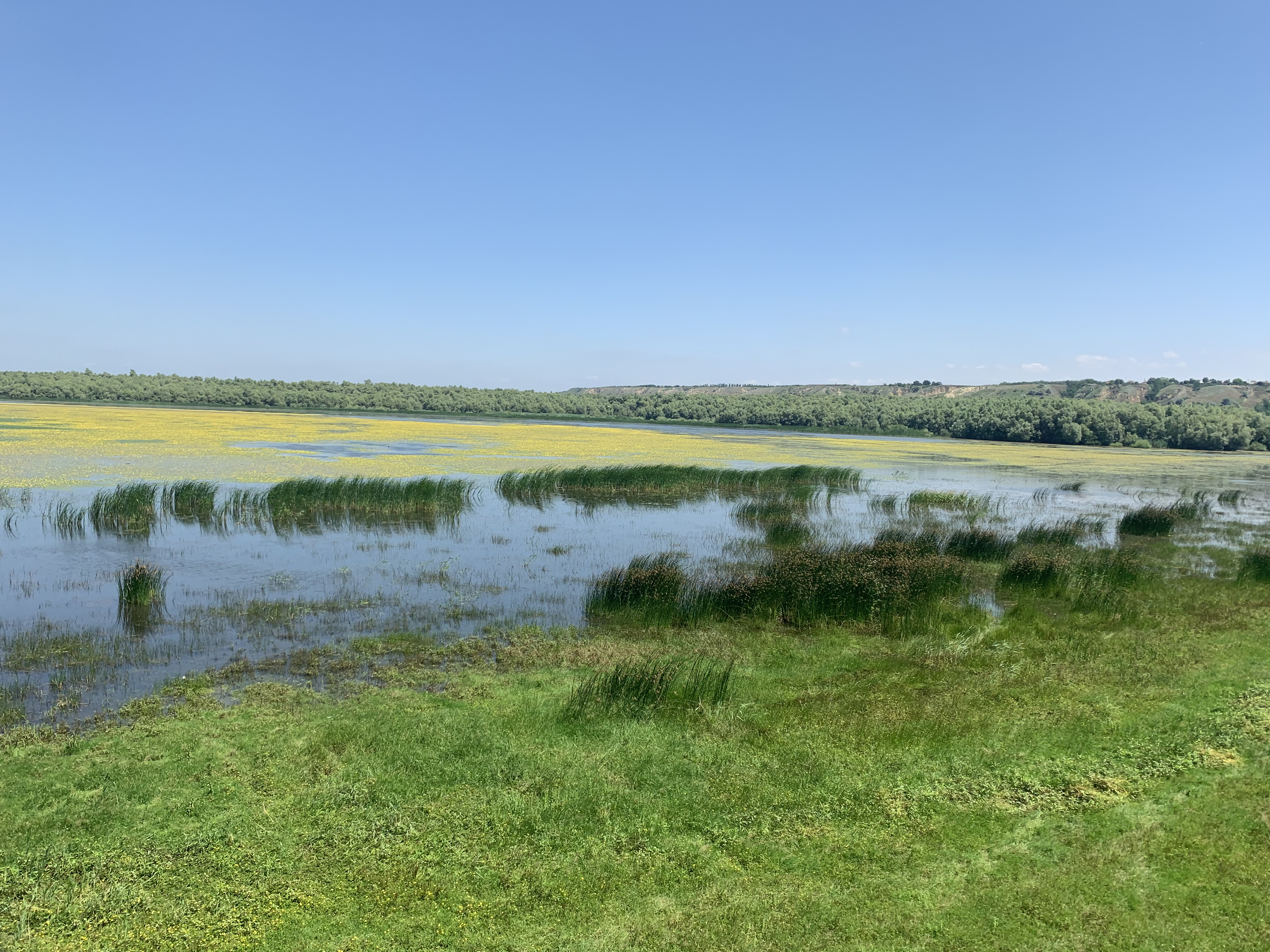

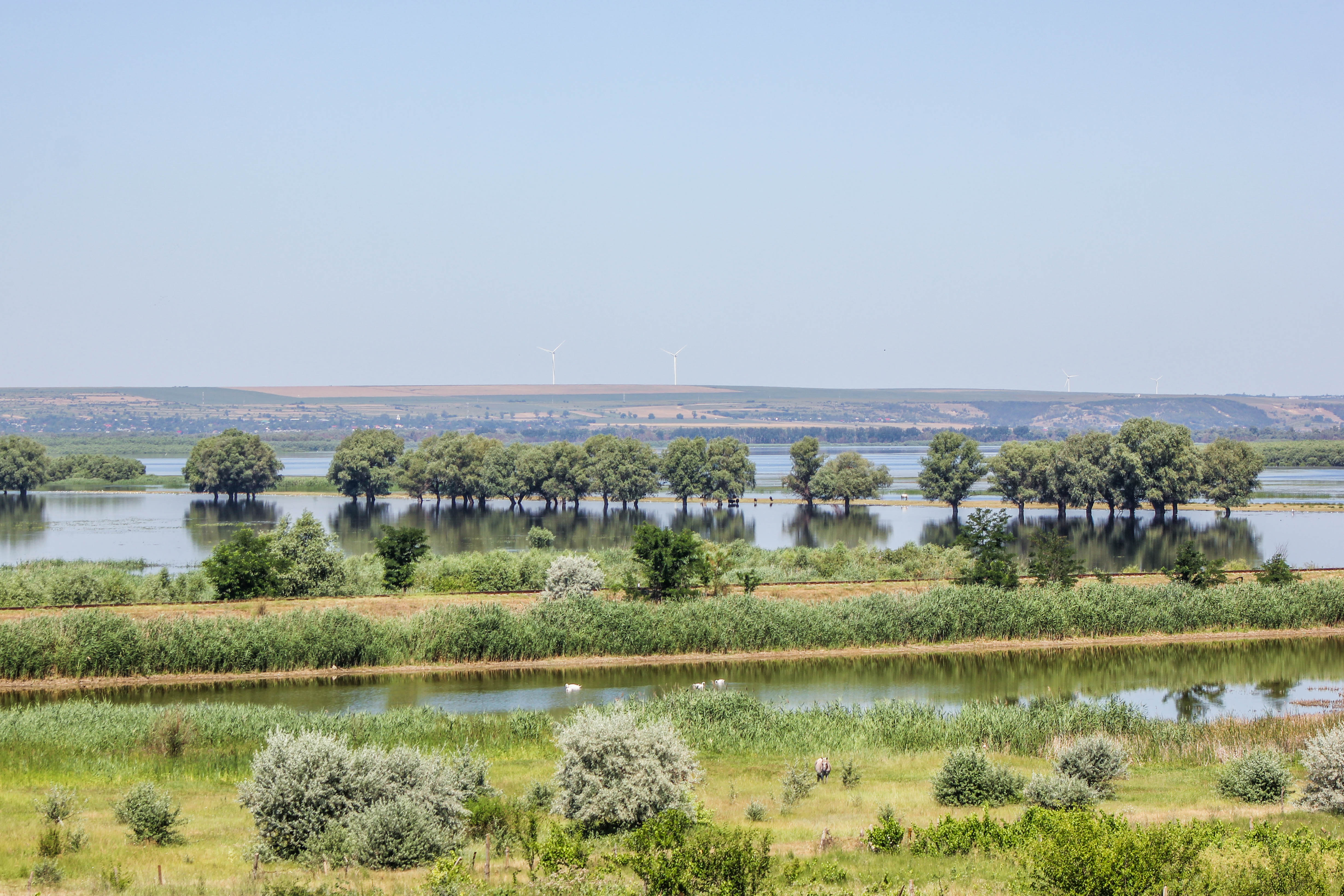

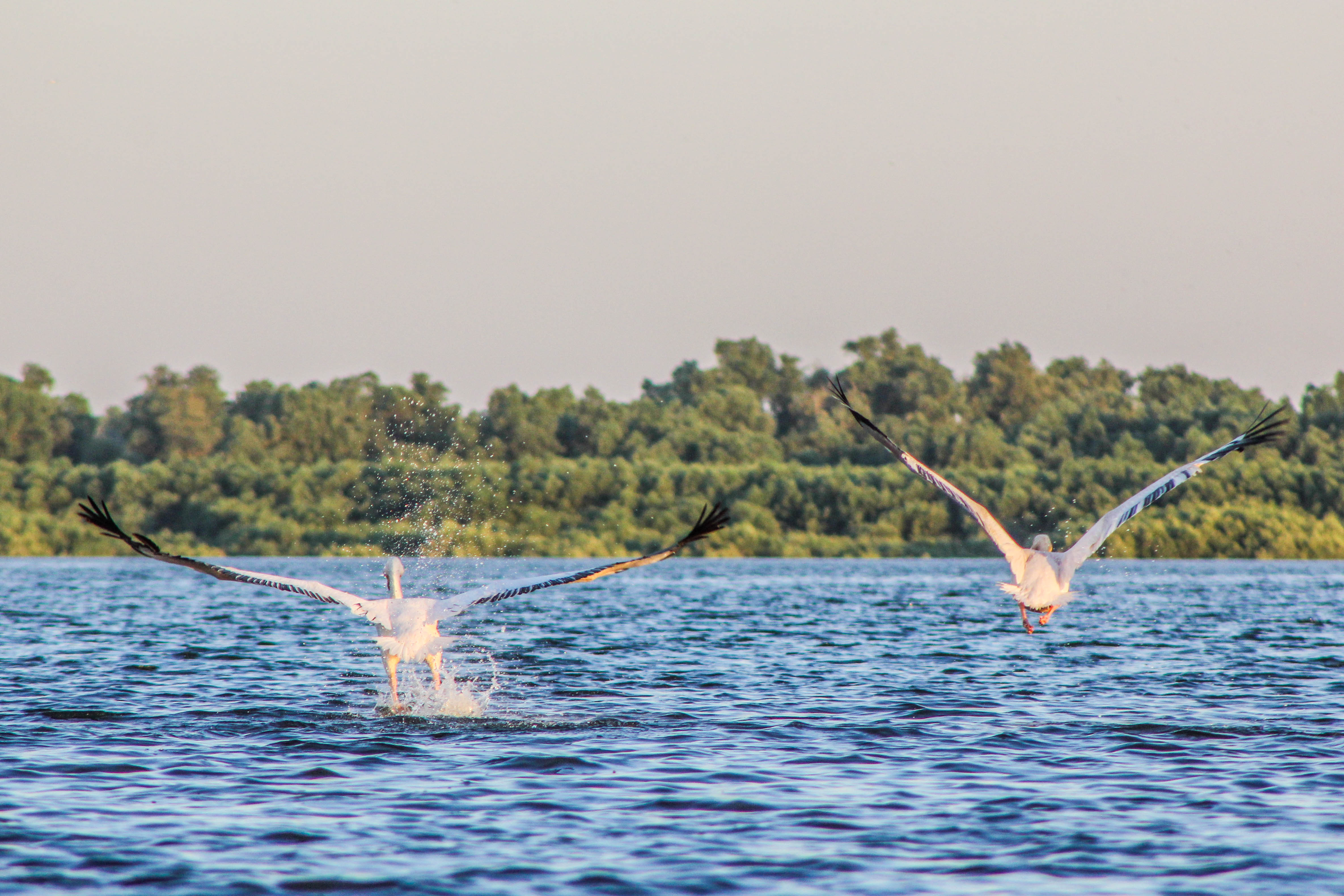

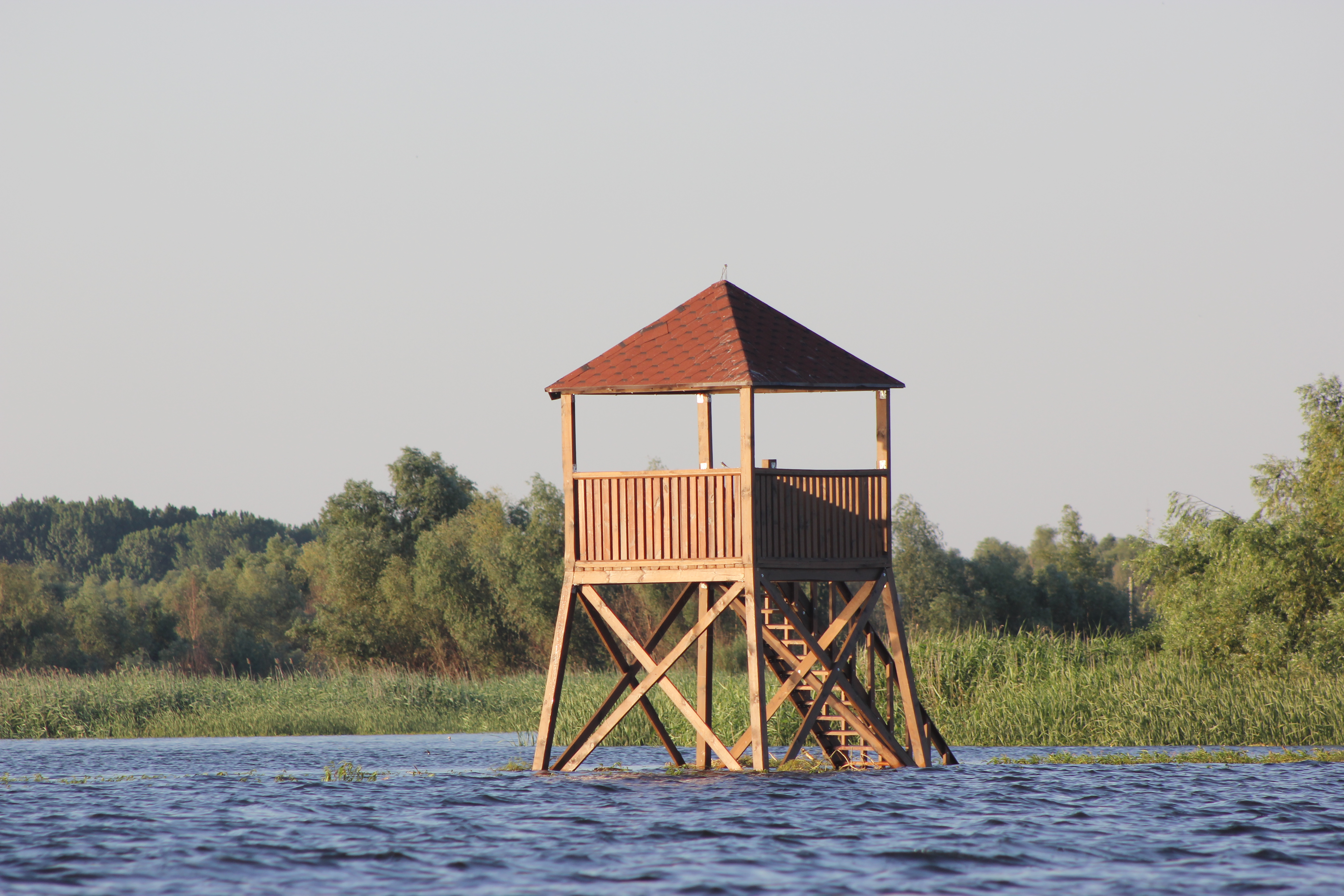
