= Longue Pointe, Chisasibi, Quebec =

Place in northern Quebec, Canada

Coordinates: 53°58′26.45″N 79°04′44.60″W

Longue Pointe (French pronunciation: [lɔ̃ɡ pwɛ̃t], "Long Point") is a place located in northern Quebec, Canada. It is part of the Cree Nation of Chisasibi Category I Land (land for exclusive use by Cree) but has no permanent population. It is used by both Cree and Inuit natives as a harbour for their fishing boats.

It is among the furthest northern point reached by road in Quebec, extending from the James Bay Road (north of the Grand River). Only the Trans-Taiga Road extends farther to the north.

== Location ==
Longue Pointe is about 25 kilometres (16 mi) north-west from Chisasibi on James Bay, and located on the border of Quebec and Nunavut Territory. It is accessible by a 48 kilometres (30 mi) gravel road from Hydro-Québec's La Grande-1 generating station, on the Grand River. The area overlooks James Bay (about 85 kilometres (53 mi) south from where it joins Hudson Bay). Early European fur traders frequented these parts, around the start of the Hudson's Bay Company.

== Image gallery ==
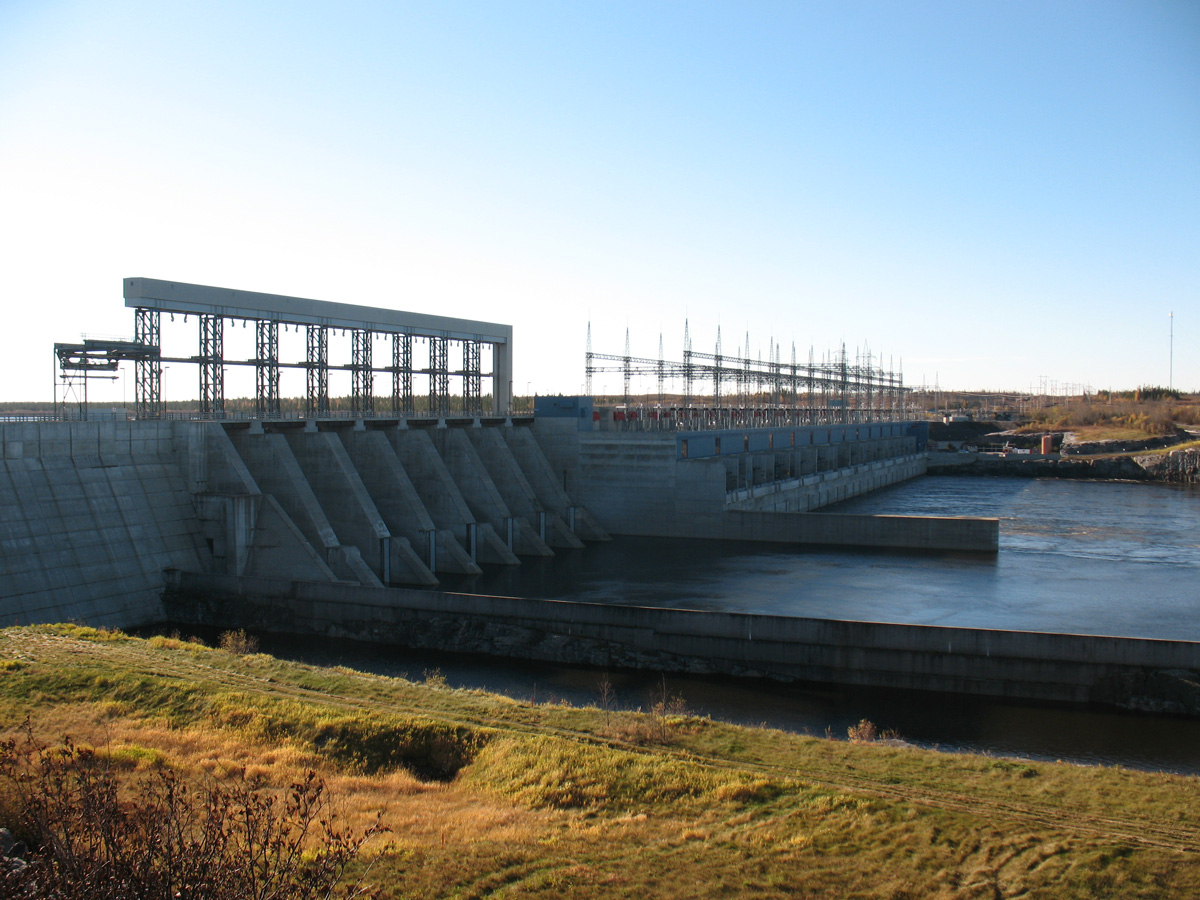
La Grande-1 hydroelectric generating station

Sign showing distance to Longue Pointe

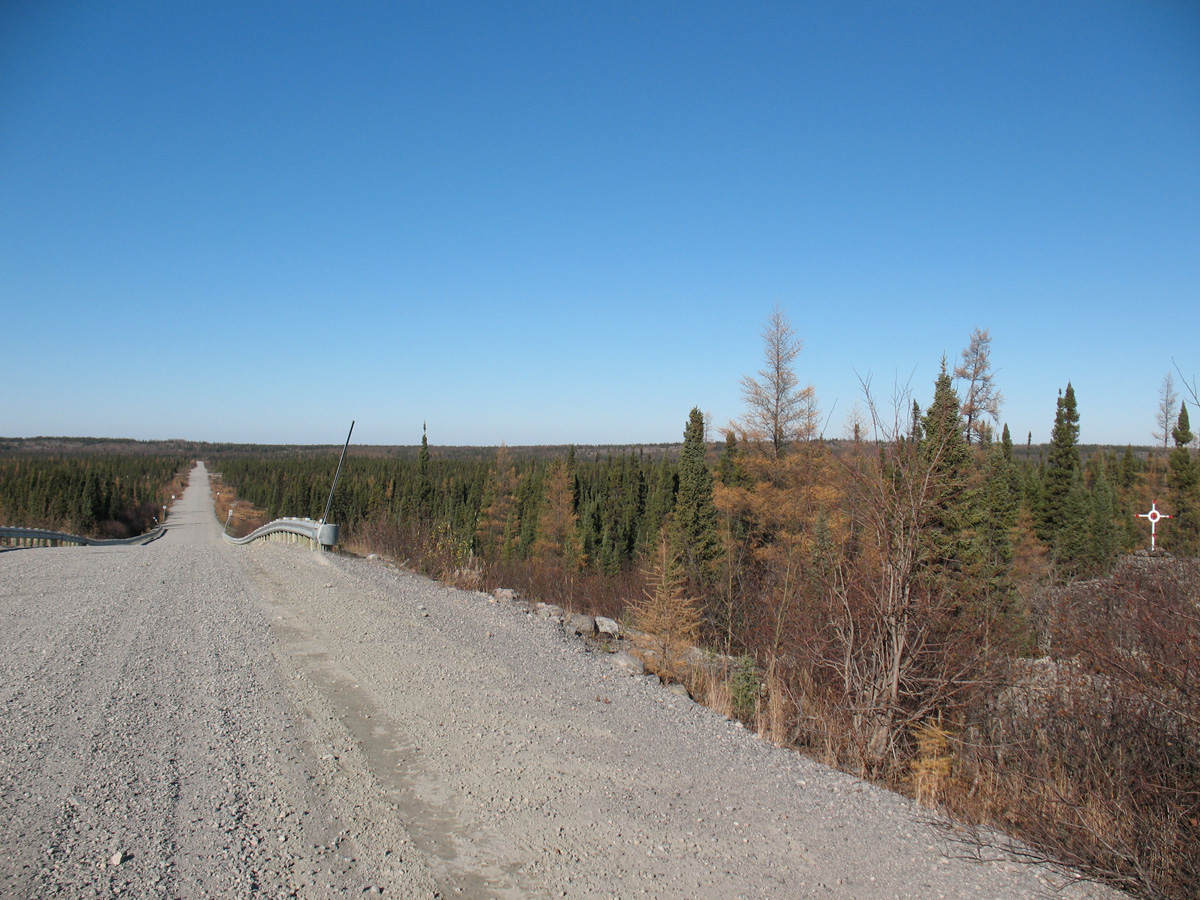
A portion of Longue Pointe Road

Longue Pointe, on James Bay

Longue Pointe, on James Bay (with James Bay in background)

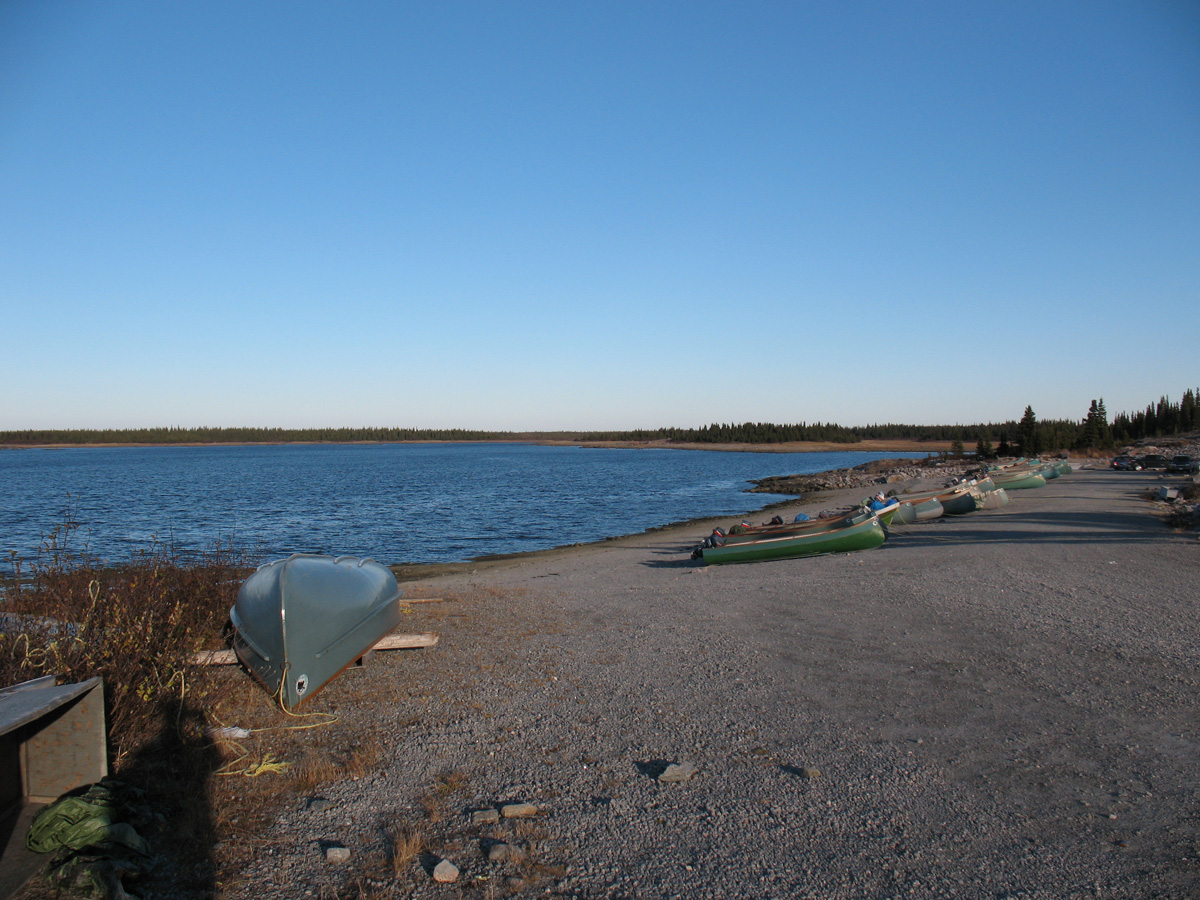
Canoe rentals at Longue Pointe

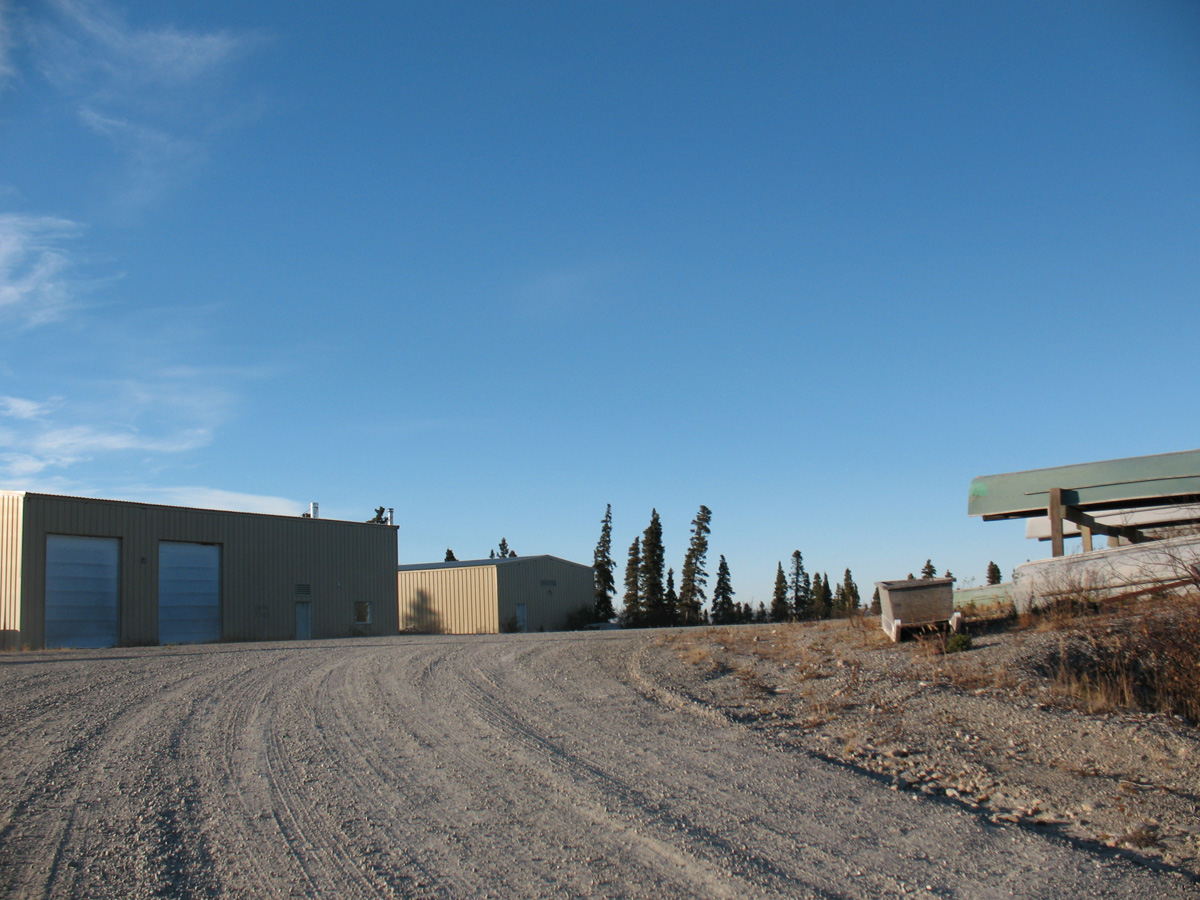
Canoe rental office at Longue Pointe

Cree homes, located along the Longue Pointe Road
