= Waterton Biosphere Reserve =

UNESCO Biosphere Region in Alberta, Canada

Waterton Biosphere Region
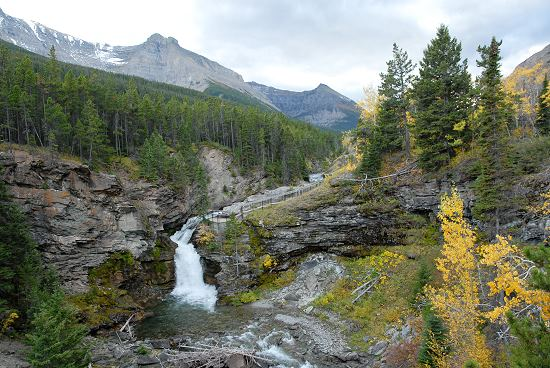
- Upper Blakiston Falls

- Location within Alberta Location within Canada
- Location: Southwestern Alberta, Canada
- Coordinates: 49°45′05″N 113°49′03″W
- Area: 66,761 hectares (257.77 sq mi)
- Established: 1979
- Governing body: Waterton Lakes National Park, Waterton Biosphere Reserve Association.

Waterton Biosphere Region (established 1979) is a UNESCO Biosphere Reserve encompassing Waterton Lakes National Park in the extreme southwest of the province of Alberta, Canada. The region includes a section of the east slopes of the Rocky Mountains extending from the Continental Divide to the edge of the Canadian Great Plains to the east, including the Municipality of Pincher Creek and Cardston County. The Glacier Biosphere Reserve and National Park in Montana, USA is located to the south of the area.

The region is administered by Waterton Lakes National Park and the Waterton Biosphere Reserve Association.

== Ecological characteristics ==
The steep environmental gradients from the Continental Divide to the prairies have created an unusually rich mosaic of habitats with their associated flora and fauna.

The biosphere region covers native prairie grasslands, aspen grove forests, subalpine forests, alpine tundra and meadows, cliffs, lakes and freshwater wetlands as well as tame pasture and cropland in the prairies.

Prairie grasslands including Danthonia spp., Festuca scabrella and prairie Junegrass; aspen grove forests with quaking aspen (Populus tremuloides), Amelanchier alnifolia and cow parsnip (Heracleum latanum); alpine tundra/high meadows characterized by Douglas fir (Pseudotsuga menziesii), lodgepole pine (Pinus contorta), limber pine (P. flexilis) and white barkpine (P. albicaulis); arctic-alpine communities above the tree line dominated by Dryas octopetala and Polemonium viscosum; upper subalpine forests with alpine larch (Larix lyallii), Luzula hitchcockii, Engelmann spruce (Picea engelmannii) and subalpine fir (Abies lasiocarpa); lower subalpine forests dominated by Engelmann spruce and subalpine fir; deciduous forest, coniferous forests dominated by Douglas fir and limber pine; cliffs, lakes and freshwater wetlands; disturbed, heavily grazed land with quaking aspen, Urtica dioica, Bromus inermis and Phleum pratense.

Several rare or threatened plant and animal species are found in Waterton Biosphere Region with more than 1000 vascular plant species, 182 bryophytes and 218 lichen species, 60 species of mammals, over 260 species of birds, 24 species of fish, and 10 reptiles and amphibians being recorded within the ecologically diverse core area.

== Socio-economic characteristics ==
The region is also home to many vibrant communities – Pincher Creek, Cardston, Crowsnest Pass, Piikani and Kainai Reserves, and others – each with a rich and distinct cultural history, and reliance on a wide range of economic activities. In Waterton Biosphere Region, people are actively involved with ranching, farming, tourism and recreation, wind energy, mining, the oil and gas industry, and other natural resource-related activities.

The Waterton Biosphere Reserve Association strives to achieve a balance between conserving biological diversity, promoting sustainable use of resources, and building the capacity of local residents, First Nations, and organizations to positively affect their communities and the environment.

== Area ==
The region's surface area (terrestrial and marine) is 1,037,070 hectares (4,004.1 sq mi). The core area is 49,936 hectares (192.80 sq mi), surrounded by buffer zone(s) of 336,476 hectares (1,299.14 sq mi) and transition area(s) of 445,213 hectares (1,718.98 sq mi).

== See also ==
- Biosphere Reserves of Canada

== Sources ==
This article incorporates text from a free content work (license statement/permission). Text taken from UNESCO - MAB Biosphere Reserves Directory, UNESCO, UNESCO.
