= Bras d'Or Lake Biosphere Region =

UNESCO Biosphere Reserve in Nova Scotia, Canada

Bras d'Or Lake Biosphere
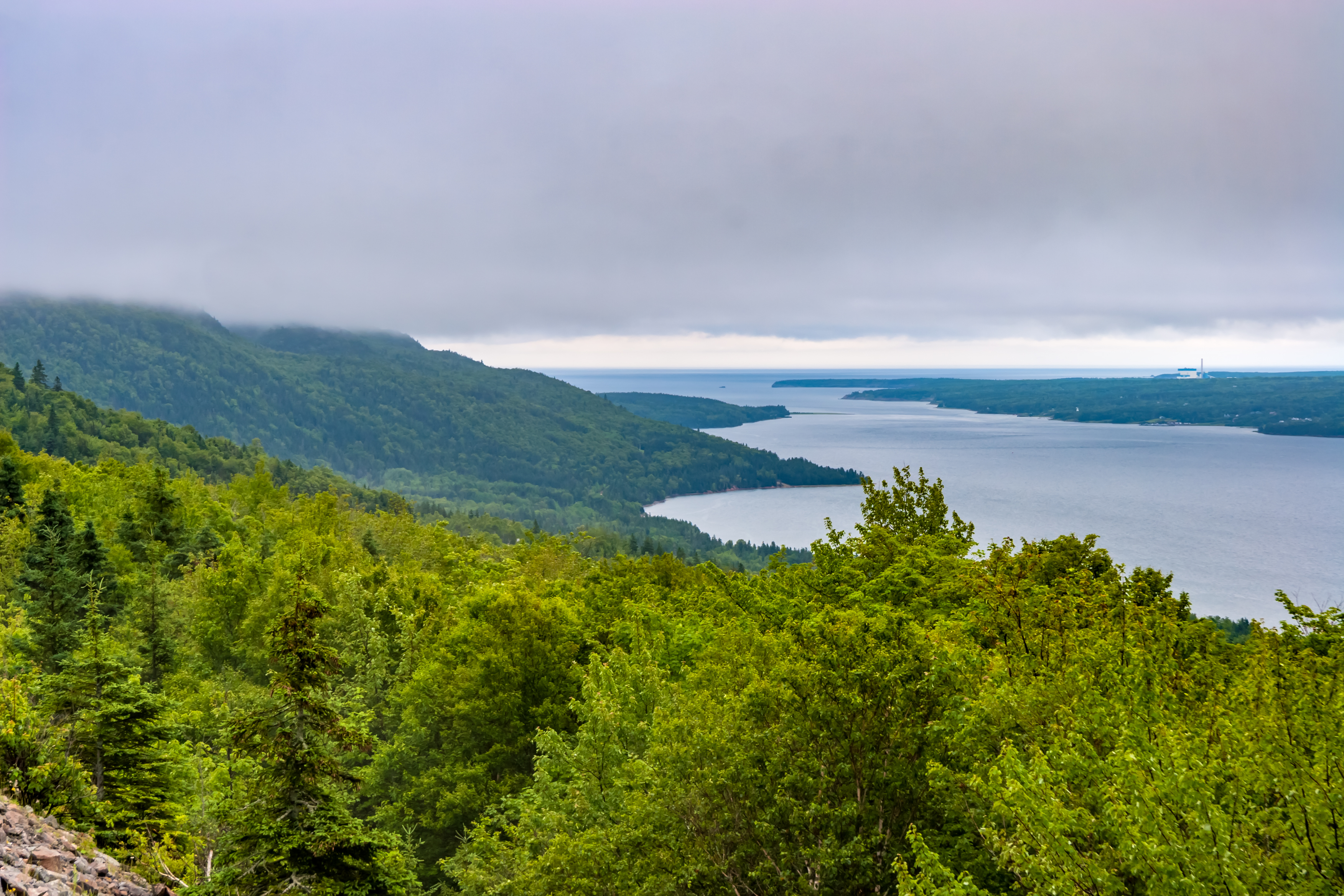
- Bras D'Or Channel

- Location within Nova Scotia
- Location: Cape Breton Island, Nova Scotia, Canada
- Coordinates: 45°53′13″N 60°42′13″W
- Area: 356,788 hectares (1,377.57 sq mi)
- Established: 2011

The Bras d'Or Lake Biosphere (officially designated 29 June 2011) is a UNESCO Biosphere located at Bras d'Or Lake, Cape Breton Island, Nova Scotia, Canada. It consists of a salt-water estuary watershed 'inland sea' with three passages to the Atlantic Ocean. The Holocene transgression flooded a complex river-lake system of diverse geology, creating the small, deep inland sea with 12 significant watersheds draining both highlands and lowlands.

The terrestrial, marine and coastal habitats provide a home for human populations, as well as other organisms. The original settlers colonized the region following the retreat of glaciers, and today their descendants make up the five Mi'kmaq populations that account for a significant proportion of the population occupying large areas of the watershed.

== Area ==
The biosphere's surface area (terrestrial and marine) is 356,788 hectares (1,377.57 sq mi). The core area is 7,712 hectares (29.78 sq mi), surrounded by buffer zone(s) of 61,460 hectares (237.3 sq mi) and transition area(s) of 287,616 hectares (1,110.49 sq mi).

== Bras d'Or Lake Biosphere Region Association ==
The Bras d’Or Lake Biosphere Region Association (established 13 March 2006) is a group of volunteers who worked to have the Bras d’Or Lake and its watershed designated as a UNESCO Man and the Biosphere Region. The association works with other local organizations already focusing on conservation, sustainable development, and capacity building (research, monitoring and education) in their programs. The association is a registered society in the province of Nova Scotia, granted status as a Registered Charity under the Income Tax Act by the Canada Revenue Agency.

You can learn more at blbra.ca

== Ecological characteristics ==
The Bras d'Or Lake is an estuarine system located in the middle of Cape Breton Island. Cape Breton is a rugged and irregularly shaped island covering about 10,280 square kilometres (3,970 sq mi). It lies northeast of mainland Nova Scotia, and is joined to the mainland by a 1.4 kilometres (0.87 mi) causeway constructed in 1955. Differential erosion has resulted in steep hills around the lake and peninsulas within it, which divide the estuarine ecosystem into five long, deep channels in the north half of the lake and a number of bays in the south. Along the west side of the watershed, steep hills rise abruptly to highland plateaus (the Cape Breton Highlands) at elevations of 250–300 metres (820–980 ft).

Extensive wetland and bog deposits occur in the upper reaches of the watershed, specifically in the Cape Breton Highlands, the Boisdale Hills and the East Bay Hills. Large wetlands in the highland portions of the Middle River and Baddeck River serve to store and release water slowly to these major sub-watersheds within the Bras d'Or Lake.

The most common fish of the boreal group found in the area are cod (Gadus morhua), white hake (Urophycis tenuis) and winter skate (Raja ocellatus). Representatives of the Arctic-boreal group include alligatorfish (Aspidophoroides monopterygius) and daubed shanny (Lumpenus maculatus).

== Socio-economic characteristics ==
Indigenous First Nations populations living within the biosphere reserve form part of Mi'kmaq communities, with the majority living in four (of the six) official reserves: We'koqmaq (Whycocomagh), Wagmatcook, Eskasoni and Potlotek. The fifth reserve, Malagawatch (occupied seasonally), is also situated within the biosphere region's area. A sixth reserve, Membertou, is located near Sydney, just outside the biosphere region, but is closely associated with indigenous communities within the biosphere region.

The majority of employment in the biosphere is linked to the tertiary service industry, although fishing, resource extraction, trading and research related to natural resources also take place.

== See also ==
- Biospheres of Canada

== Sources ==
This article incorporates text from a free content work (license statement/permission). Text taken from UNESCO - MAB Biosphere Directory, UNESCO, UNESCO.
