= Long Point Provincial Park =

Provincial park in Ontario, Canada

- IUCN category II (national park)
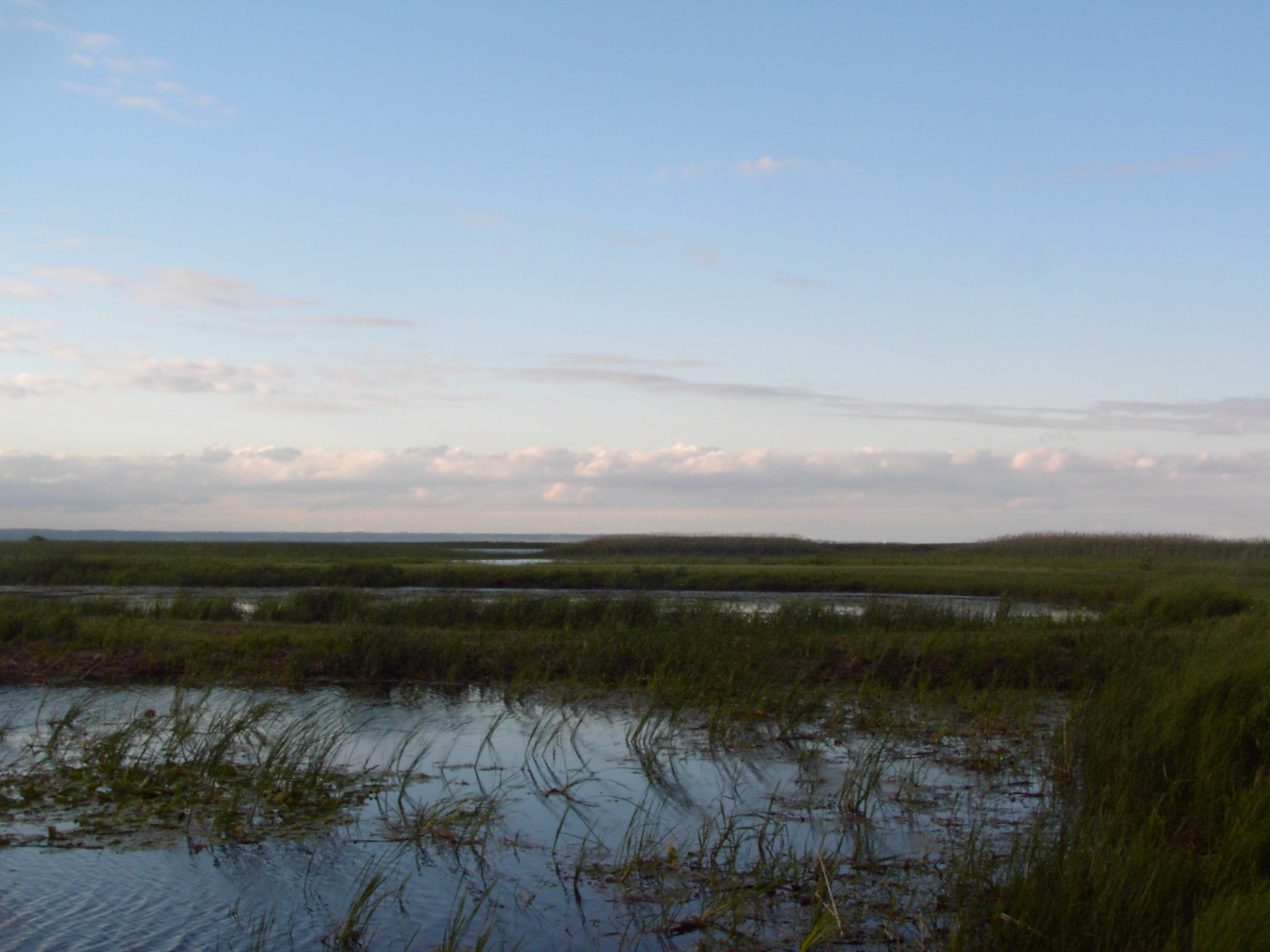
- The marshes of Long Point as seen from Long Point Provincial Park

- Location within Southern Ontario
- Interactive map of Long Point Provincial Park
- Location: Norfolk County, Ontario, Canada
- Nearest city: Long Point
- Coordinates: 42°34′48″N 80°23′6″W
- Area: 1.50 km^{2} (0.58 sq mi)
- Established: 1921
- Visitors: 100,000 (in 2022)
- Governing body: Ontario Parks
- Website: https://www.ontarioparks.ca/park/longpoint

Long Point Provincial Park is a provincial park on the northwest shore of Lake Erie near Port Rowan, Ontario, Canada. The park is part of a sandy spit of land called Long Point that juts out into the lake. It covers part of the area of Long Point Biosphere Reserve, which was designated a UNESCO Biosphere Reserve because of its biological significance.

== Summary ==
Long Point Provincial Park is famous for its migrating birds during spring and fall, and attracts thousands of birdwatchers. There have been 383 different species recorded on Long Point. Many different types of turtles and snakes are a common sight during the summer season. The park is within the most significant part of the core range of the Fowler's toad (Anaxyrus fowleri). This species of toad is designated as a threatened species within Ontario and Canada by the Committee on the Status of Endangered Wildlife in Canada.

There are two parts to the park, the "Old Park" (also known as Cottonwood Campground), which is a small chunk of land surrounded by cottages that contains about eighty camp sites; it just recently got showers and comfort stations (washroom). The other section is the "new park", which contains Firefly, Monarch's Rest and Turtle Dunes Campgrounds as well as a boat launch and many good views of the marshes and Long Point Bay. It is larger and more spread than the old park and about a kilometre further down Long Point.

In total, Long Point Provincial park has 256 camp sites including 78 electrical sites located in Firefly Campground. The beach is easily accessible from all four campgrounds.

== See also ==
- List of Ontario Parks
- Bird Studies Canada
