= Mura-Drava-Danube =

Biosphere reserve in Croatia and Hungary

- Bačko Podunavlje
- IUCN category IV (habitat/species management area)
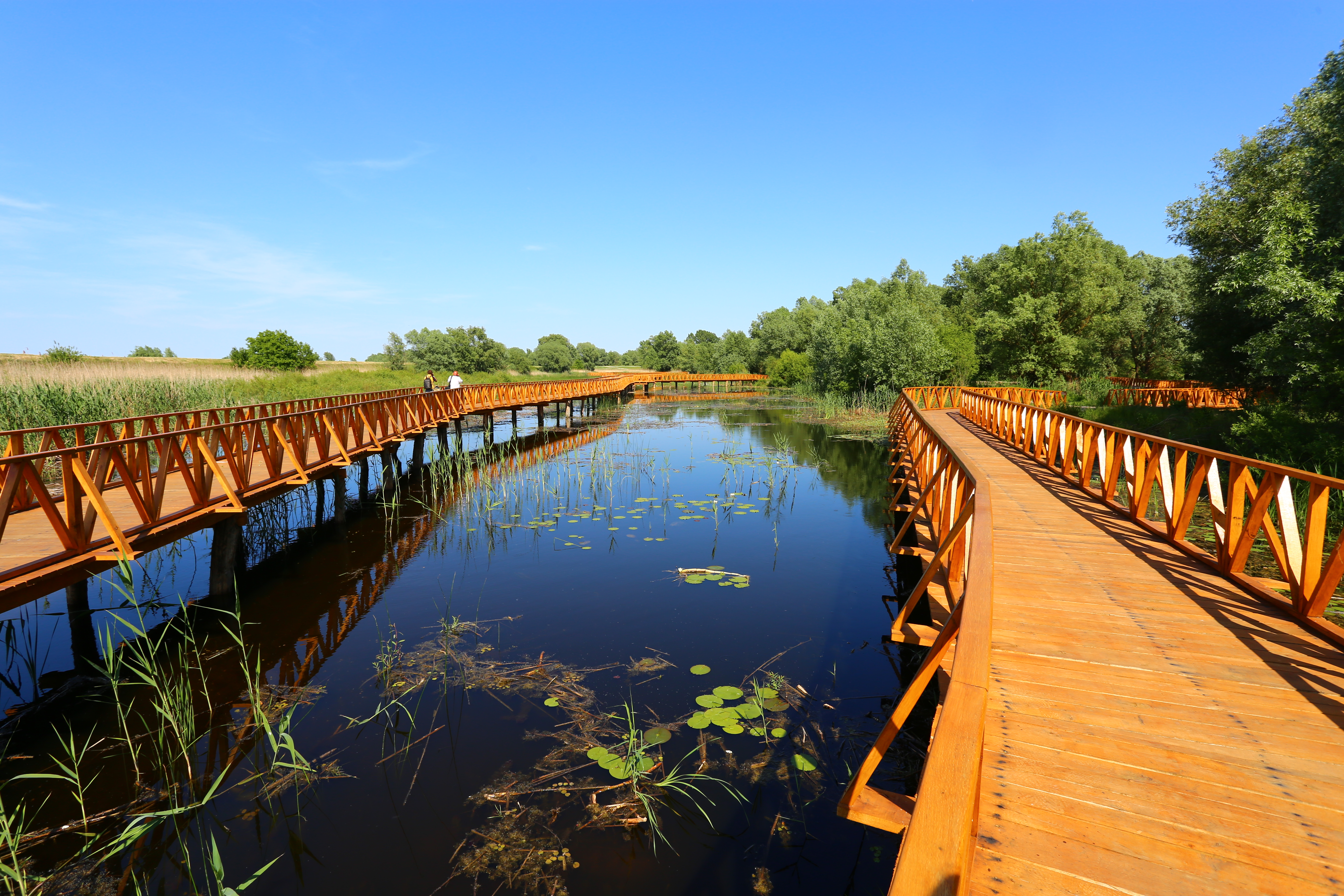
- Kopački rit
- Interactive map of Mura-Drava-Danube
- Coordinates: 45°55′50″N 18°55′34″E
- Area: 631,460.71 ha (2,438.0834 sq mi)
- Designated: 2016
- Administrator: Ministry of Culture (Croatia) and Danube-Drava National Park Directorate (Hungary)

Mura-Drava-Danube (UNESCO designation: Bačko Podunavlje, Serbian Cyrillic: Бачко Подунавље) is a transboundary biosphere reserve along the Drava, Mura and Danube rivers. The reserve spans 631,460.71 hectares (1,560,373.4 acres): 395,860.71 hectares (978,193.1 acres) in Croatia and 235,600 hectares (582,000 acres) in Hungary.

Flood prevention dams on the rivers separate the reserve into a flooded area and a flood-controlled side.

It is one of the best preserved wetlands in the Danube River Basin area. In 2009, the preliminary bilateral agreement between Croatia and Hungary was reached on creating a joint natural reserve in the Drava-Danube region. In March 2011, corresponding ecology ministries from five countries (Austria, Slovenia, Croatia, Hungary, Serbia) agreed on creating a Trans-boundary Biosphere Reserve of Mura-Drava-Danube which would consist of more than 700 square kilometres (270 sq mi) of the core zone (already protected areas), 2,300 square kilometres (890 sq mi) of buffer zones and 7,000 square kilometres (2,700 sq mi) of transitional zones. It should include the already protected areas: Kopački rit, Veliki Pažut, Mura-Drava (in Croatia), Danube-Drava National Park (in Hungary), Gornje Podunavlje, Karađorđevo, Tikvara (in Serbia) and several Natura 2000 protected areas in Austria, Slovenia and Hungary. With 10,000 square kilometres (3,900 sq mi) in total, it would be among the largest protected terrestrial areas in Europe, hence it was named the "Amazon of Europe - Mura-Drava-Danube". In June 2016 UNESCO officially designated the reserve and in September 2016 five ministers opened the reserve and agreed on future cooperation and joint management. That management will include the administration of the river ecosystems in sustainable way, renewal and protection of the natural wetlands and biodiversity, taking care of the drinking water, spurring of the economic development: organic production, tourism and protection of the diverse cultural heritage in each of the countries.

== UNESCO Biosphere Reserve ==
The reserve was officially designated UNESCO Biosphere Reserve on 14 June 2017 under the title "Bačko Podunavlje". Podunavlje is the second UNESCO Biosphere Reserve in Serbia after Golija-Studenica, designated in 2001.
