= East Vättern Scarp Landscape Biosphere Reserve =

Biosphere reserve in Sweden

East Vättern Scarp Landscape
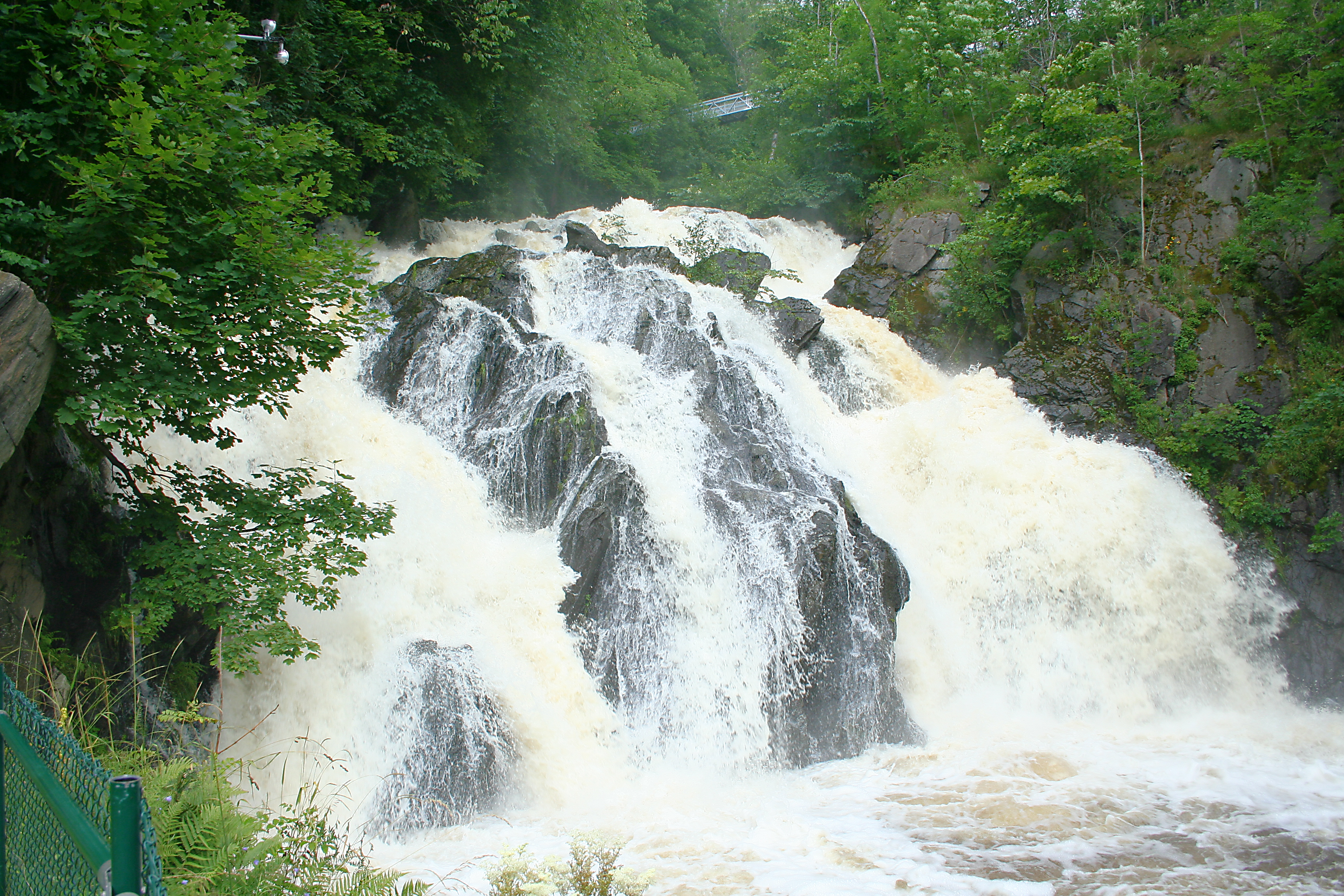
- Waterfall in Huskvarna
- Interactive map of East Vättern Scarp Landscape
- Location: Sweden
- Nearest city: Huskvarna
- Coordinates: 64°30′0″N 14°22′0.120″E
- Area: 105,520 hectares (407.4 sq mi)
- Established: 2012
- Website: www.ostravatterbranterna.se

The East Vättern Scarp Landscape (Swedish: Östra Vätterbranterna) Biosphere Reserve (established 2012) is a UNESCO Biosphere Reserve in Sweden. The 105,520 hectares (407.4 sq mi) reserve is a distinct example of the landscape in the central part of southern Sweden. The East Vättern Scarp Landscape contains many parallel fault scarps, most notably a steep western-facing precipice above the eastern border of Lake Vättern. This rugged landscape, cut by many small waterways, is dominated by agriculture and forestry lands, with villages and settlements consisting of small farms and individual homes. The reserve includes portions of Vättern and other deep lakes. The core area is 2,120 hectares (8.2 sq mi), surrounded by buffer zone(s) of 41,800 hectares (161 sq mi) and transition area(s) of 61,600 hectares (238 sq mi).

== Ecological characteristics ==
The East Vättern Scarp Landscape region is centrally located in southern Sweden, with elements of habitats reflecting the country’s southern deciduous broadleaf forest region and the northern coniferous forest region.

The biosphere reserve contains several deep lakes. Of these, Lake Vättern is Sweden’s largest cold water lake, and the fifth largest lake in Europe, with a total surface of 105,520 hectares (407.4 sq mi). The lake is home to 31 fish species, including the large salmonid species Salvelinus umbla, which is also one of the key symbolic species of the East Vättern Scarp Landscape. It is also home to great biodiversity in a wide range of organism groups. There are several glacial relict species in Lake Vättern – a number of crustaceans and a few fish species (including grayling (Thymallus thymallus) – which have adapted to lake living after the last glacial period and post-glacial rebound. The insects along the shores of Lake Vättern are also notable, more reminiscent of the rivers of Northern Sweden than lakes in the south of the country.

On a stretch of just a few kilometers there are four different hardiness zones and extensive biodiversity. Lake Vättern has a clear influence on the local climate, with cold springs, but long, mild autumns. Because of this, several post-glacial warming relicts have been able to survive in the region and in the slopes down to Lake Vättern, which have an oceanic climate. For example, the only incidence in all Scandinavia of the symbolic species Ena montana, the Bulin snail, occurs in the ravine environments near the lake. Gisebo and Gränna are home to one of the country’s largest fruit growing districts, which is not common at this latitude and altitude. Due to the central location of the East Vättern Scarp Landscape in the southern one-third of Sweden, both eastern and western species are found here, as well as typically northern coniferous forest environments and typically southern Swedish wooded meadows. From a macro perspective, the East Vättern Scarp Landscape can be seen as a large border zone that gradually transitions from more open, broadleaf-dominated landscapes near the lake to more dense wooded landscapes on the South Swedish Highlands. For this reason, the hazel dormouse (Muscardinus avellanarius) has been named the symbolic species for these environments.

== Socio-economic characteristics ==
There are several large scale farms and manors, as well as three urban areas. One feature of the region is a transition from completely urban East Vättern Scarp Landscape – Jönköping/Huskvarna is Sweden’s ninth largest urban area - to an active farming environment in a more sparsely populated rural area. In total nearly 40,000 people live in the area, of whom about 31,000 live in the larger urban environments.

In the past fifty years, the number of agricultural companies in the East Vättern Scarp Landscape has dropped dramatically. In 1975 there were 300 agricultural companies in Gränna, Ölmstad and Skärstad. That number has been halved in the last thirty years, which changes the conditions for rural development here.

Active agriculture and forestry are the foundation of a living countryside, but other production is of growing importance. Many rural properties are managed part-time or on the owner’s leisure time, which has limited the negative effects of reduced profitability.

The small-scale farming landscape produces many raw materials that can be used for food, medicine, construction material, fuel and fodder.

== Sources ==
This article incorporates text from a free content work (license statement/permission). Text taken from UNESCO - MAB Biosphere Reserves Directory, UNESCO, UNESCO.
