= Long Point State Park =

Long Point State Park may refer to:

- Long Point State Park – Finger Lakes, on Cayuga Lake in central New York, United States
- Long Point State Park – Thousand Islands, on the St. Lawrence River in north central New York, United States
- Long Point State Park on Lake Chautauqua, in western New York, United States
