= Long Point Biosphere Reserve =

Biosphere Reserve in Ontario, Canada

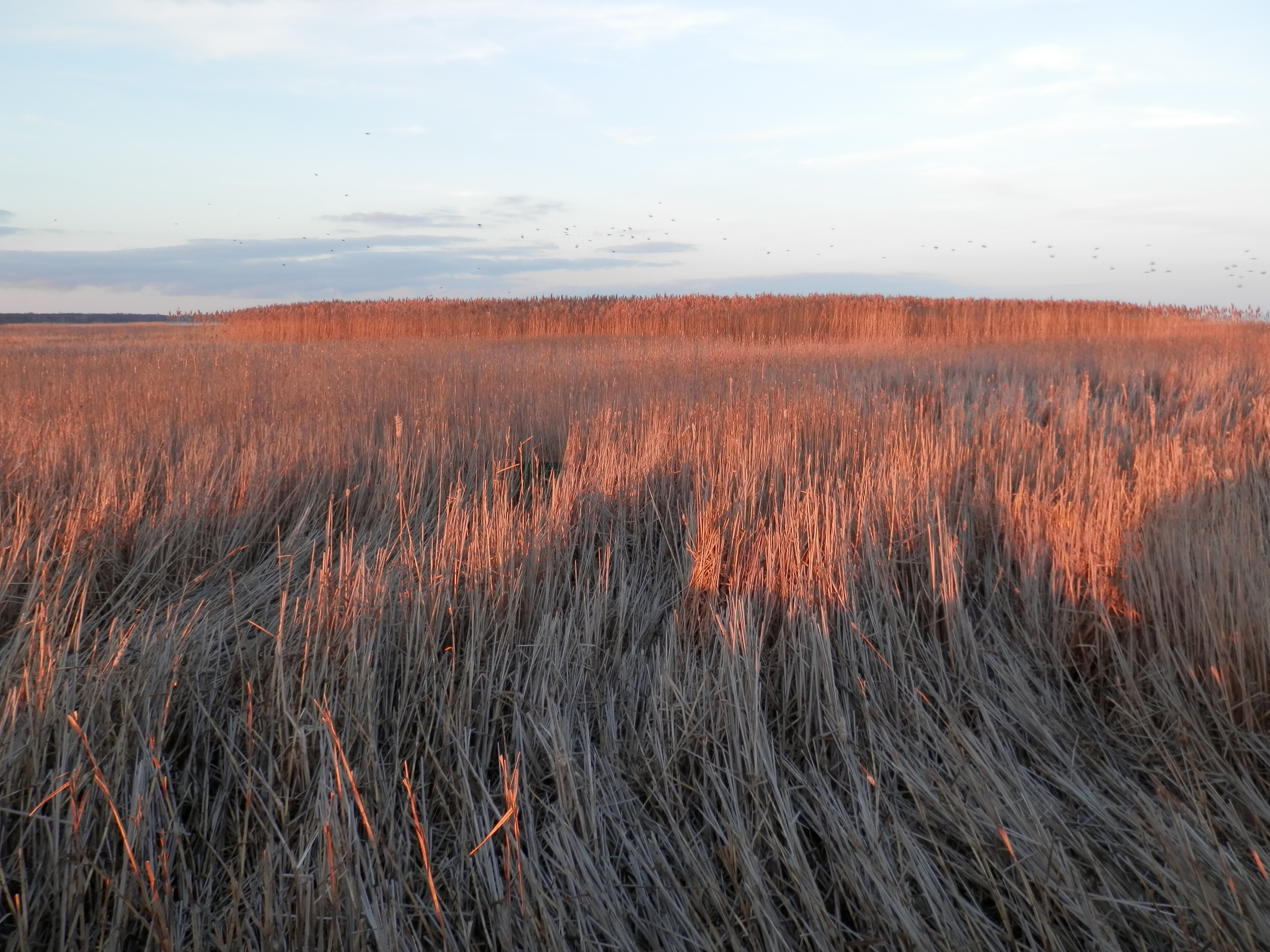

- Location within Southern Ontario Location within Canada
- Location: Norfolk County, Ontario, Canada
- Coordinates: 42°35′N 80°23′W
- Area: 40,600 ha (100,000 acres)
- Designated: 1986

The Long Point Biosphere Reserve is located in southern Canada on the shores of Lake Erie in Norfolk County. The area encompasses a rich mosaic of ecological systems associated with erosion deposit sand spit formations around the Laurentian Great Lakes, as well as some of the largest remaining forest tracts in "Carolinian Canada". The variety of habitats supports a rich flora and fauna, including a waterfowl staging area and a migration stopover area for land birds of continental importance. Long Point Biosphere Reserve has been recognized as a Ramsar site and as a globally significant Important Bird Area by Bird Life International. Established in 1960, the bird observatory is the oldest, continuously operated, in North America.

== Ecological characteristics ==
Long Point is one of Canada’s iconic landscapes, with a sand spit formation extending 40 km into Lake Erie. It is the largest erosion deposit formation in the Great Lakes, created by water-borne sediments swept eastward and deposited in part along an underwater glacial moraine. Habitats on and surrounding Long Point include woodlands, sand dunes and bluffs, marshes, ponds, meadows, beaches and lakeshore. The complex is the largest biophysical formation of its kind in the Laurentian Great Lakes of North America.

Inner Long Point Bay covers approximately 78 square kilometres (30 sq mi) between the spit and Lake Erie’s north shore. The Inner Bay is a diverse sport fishery and continentally important staging area for migratory waterfowl. Immediately adjacent to the coastal reserve is a distinctive terrestrial area of temperate ‘Carolinian’ broadleaf forests, conifer plantations, oak savannas and diverse agro-ecosystems.

Recorded among the flora and fauna in the reserve and surrounding region are 1,384 species of plants, 370 species of birds, 102 species of fish, 46 species of mammals, 34 species of amphibians and reptiles, and 91 species of butterflies. These include American ginseng (Panax quinquefolius), American badger (Taxidea taxus), Acadian flycatcher (Empidonax virescens) and channel darter (Percina copelandi).

== Socioeconomic characteristics ==
There are approximately 3,500 permanent and seasonal residents in the current biosphere reserve transition area, including many visitors to the area and provincial parks. The population of Norfolk County in 2006 was 62,563, up 2.8% from 60,845 in 2001.

In economic terms, Norfolk County is one of the most diversified agricultural economies in Canada, with gross farm receipts of US$420 million (in 2006), making it the fifth-largest agricultural region in Ontario. A wide range of field, grain, oilseed, fruit, vegetable and specialty crops are grown. Livestock production includes beef and dairy cattle, hogs and poultry. Eco-tourism also forms an important part of the local economy, with Long Point Provincial Park receiving about 300,000 visitors per year.

== See also ==
- Biosphere Reserves of Canada

== Sources ==
This article incorporates text from a free content work (license statement/permission). Text taken from UNESCO - MAB Biosphere Reserves Directory, UNESCO, UNESCO.

== See also ==
- List of UNESCO Biosphere Reserves in Canada
- Long Point National Wildlife Area
