= Manicouagan Uapishka Biosphere Reserve =

UNESCO Biosphere Reserve in Quebec, Canada

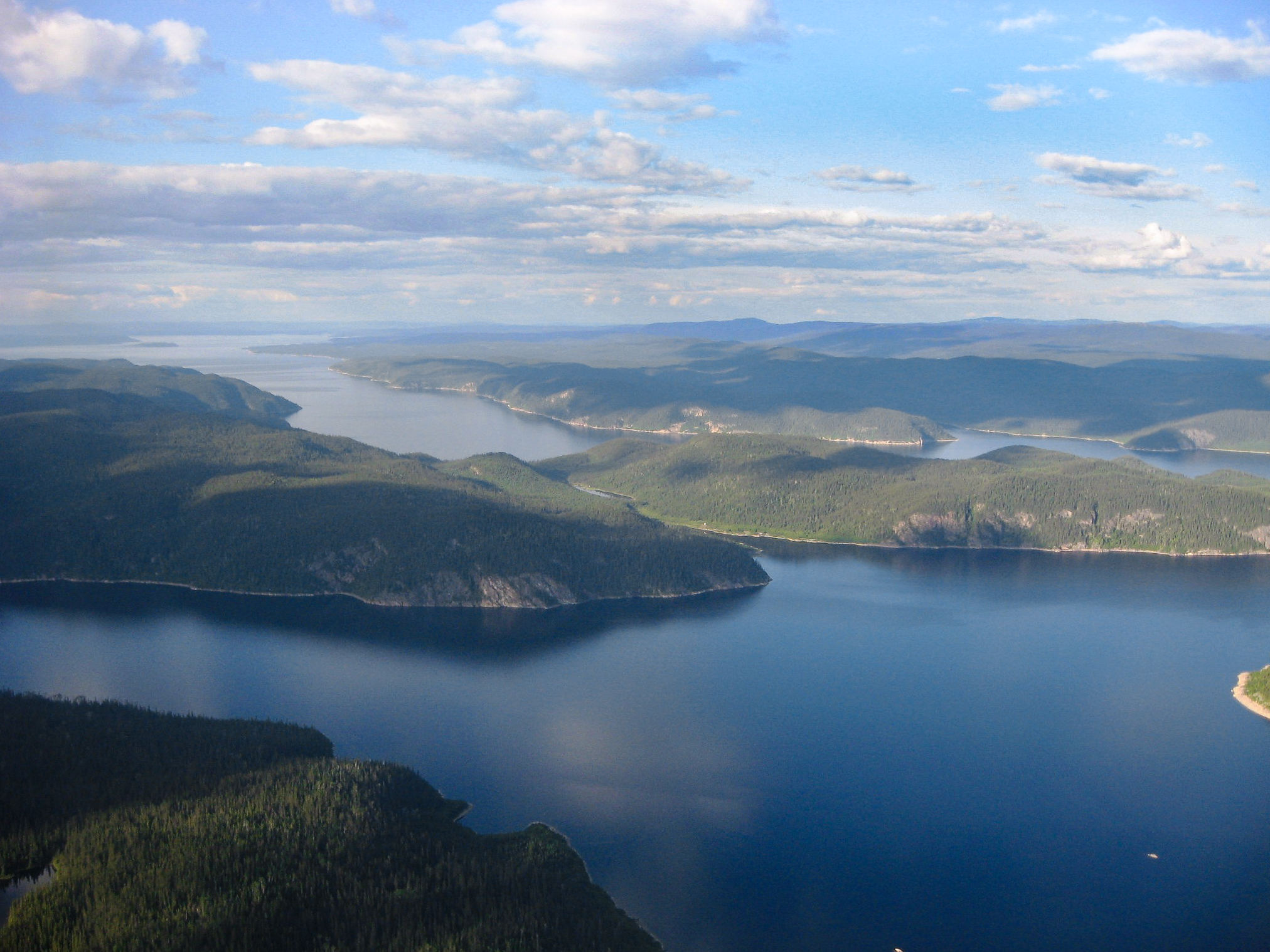
- Aerial view of Manicouagan Reservoir and the surrounding forests

- Location within Quebec Location within Canada
- Location: Quebec, Canada
- Coordinates: 49°14′24″N 68°08′24″W
- Established: 2007
- Governing body: Réserve Mondiale de la Biosphère Manicouagan – Uapishka (RMBMU)

The Manicouagan Uapishka Biosphere Reserve is a biosphere reserve in Canada. The area was designated as such by the United Nations Educational, Scientific and Cultural Organization (UNESCO) in 2007.

The landscape of the Manicouagan – Uapishka Biosphere Reserve is dominated by the Saint Lawrence River to the south and the Manicouagan reservoir to the north, forming a circle visible from great distances, even from space. They are linked by a web of rivers, which flow through vast woodlands.

== Ecological Characteristics ==
The Manicouagan – Uapishka Biosphere Reserve was formed by the erosion of millions of years, combined with the collision of a huge meteorite, the crushing passage of glaciers and an ancient sea that smoothed the land. The impact of the meteorite formed the crater and circular lake that characterize this biosphere reserve.

The hinterland of the Manicouagan – Uapishka area consists of a vast dry plateau. Its surface is formed by hills ranging between 400 m and 600 m, separated by rectilinear valleys and surrounded by the Groulx Mountains massif, which is characterized by about 30 mountains over 1000 m in height.

The salt marshes of the Manicouagan – Uapishka reserve are among the most productive habitats on the planet, acting as important resting places for more than 200 migratory birds. Fauna characteristic of boreal forests in the area include the vulnerable boreal woodland caribou (Rangifer tarandus caribou), least weasel (Mustela nivalis), short-eared owl (Asio flammeus), golden eagle (Aquila chrysaetos), and the threatened wolverine (Gulo gulo) and beluga whale (Delphinapterus leucas).

== Socio-Economic Characteristics ==
The largest city in the area is Baie-Comeau with a population just under 23,000. The main economic activities include timber transformation, agriculture, aluminum production, mining, commercial fisheries and merchant shipping. A huge hydroelectric power plant also creates employment opportunities.

The area also contains an Innu reserve with a resident population of about 2,500 inhabitants. The Manicouagan population along the coastline has over time become almost exclusively French with the descendants of ancient Indigenous families living on the Pessamit reserve.

== See also ==
- Biosphere Reserves of Canada
- Uapishka Biodiversity Reserve

== Sources ==
This article incorporates text from a free content work (license statement/permission). Text taken from UNESCO - MAB Biosphere Reserves Directory, UNESCO, UNESCO.
