= Tsá Tué Biosphere Reserve =

Biosphere reserve in the Northwest Territories

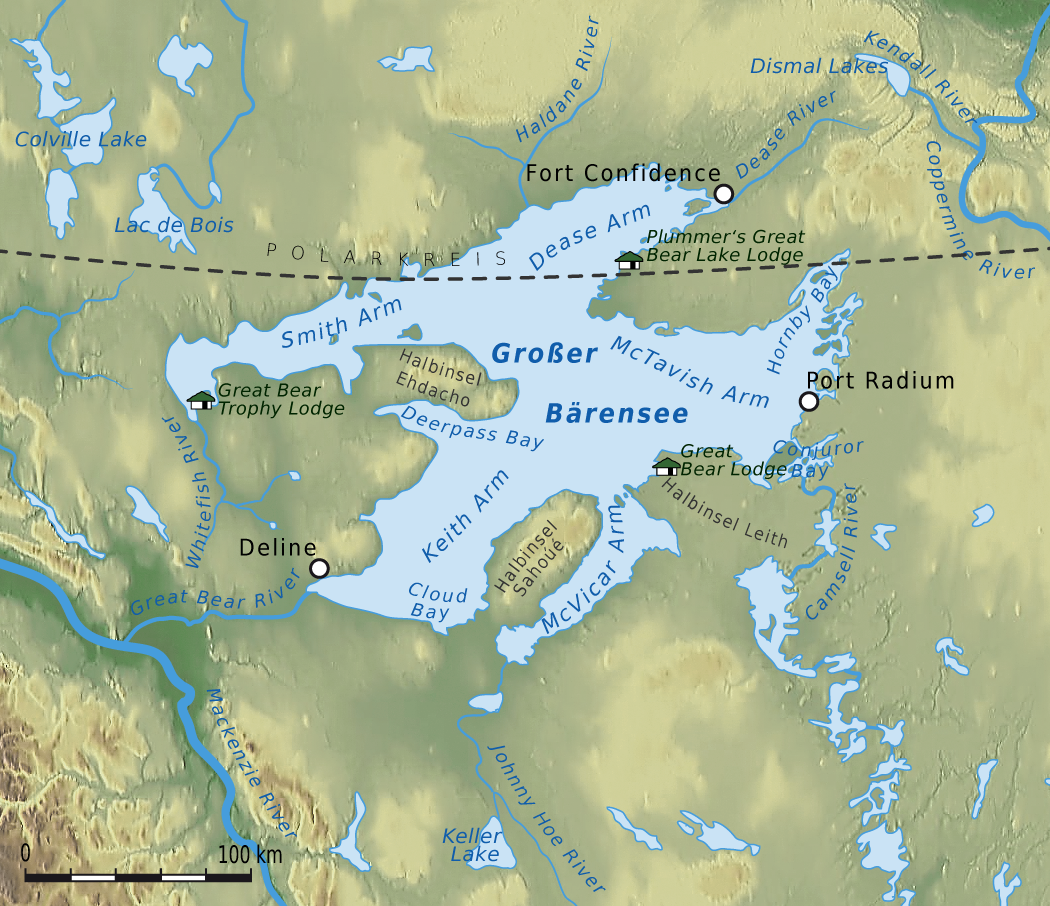
- Great Bear Lake, Northwest Territories

- Location within Canada
- Coordinates: 66°02′06″N 120°35′17″W
- Area: ca 93'313 km2
- Established: 2016

The Tsá Tué Biosphere Reserve is a protected region in the Northwest Territories around (and including) the Great Bear Lake. It was recognized as an international biosphere reserve by UNESCO in 2016. It is the largest biosphere reserve on the North America continent.

The reserve encompasses the Great Bear Lake, described as the last large pristine arctic lake, and is the homeland of the Sahtuto’ine, the "Bear Lake People". It is highlighted as an example of the first biosphere reserve in the world administrated completely by an indigenous community. Its habitat and wildlife include barren-ground caribou herds, muskox, wolves, wolverines, bears, moose, waterfowl as well as boreal woodland. The region is representative of an arctic and boreal ecoregion with a presence of caribou and grizzly bears.
