= Iran–Pakistan relations =

- Iran: Pakistan

Diplomatic mission
- Embassy of Iran, Islamabad: Embassy of Pakistan, Tehran

Envoy
- Ambassador Reza Amiri-Moghadam: Ambassador Imran Ahmed Siddiqui

Iran and Pakistan established relations on 14 August 1947, the day of the independence of Pakistan, when Iran became the first country to recognize Pakistan. Both countries generally maintain a cordial relationship with formed alliances in a number of areas of mutual interest, such as combating the drug trade along their border and the cross-border insurgency in Balochistan.

During the Cold War (1945–1991), both countries were part of the Western Bloc against the Eastern Bloc. They were founding members of the anti-communist alliance CENTO. Iran aided Pakistan in the India–Pakistan war of 1965 and India–Pakistan war of 1971, and backed Pakistan in the Bangladesh Liberation War and Indo-Pakistani War of 1971. Both countries shared a common animosity towards Baloch separatists and cooperated in the 1970s Balochistan operation. Following the Iranian Revolution of 1979, which overthrew the Pahlavi dynasty, Pakistan was one of the first countries to recognize the Islamic Republic of Iran, and worked together during the Soviet–Afghan War (1979–1989) when Iran backed the Pakistan-funded Afghan mujahideen, and Pakistan supported Iran in the Iran–Iraq War (1980–1988); however, following the next phase of the Afghan civil war, relations between the two became tense after Iran and Pakistan backed opposing sides, respectively the Northern Alliance and the Taliban. Following the September 11 attacks, Iran and Pakistan joined the war on terror but failed to align due to conflicted interests.

Pakistan has also provided support to Iran in the Iran–Israel proxy conflict and served as a mediator in the Iran–Saudi Arabia proxy conflict. After the U.S. complete withdrawal of its troops and the Taliban return to power in the 2020s, Pakistan stepped up cooperation with Iran to promote peace and stability in Afghanistan. Iran has also expressed an interest in joining the China–Pakistan Economic Corridor as part of the larger Belt and Road Initiative.

On the other hand, Pakistan is one of the few countries where Iranian influence is positively received as per polls conducted by the Pew Research Center. Polls have consistently shown that a very high proportion of Pakistanis view their western neighbour positively. Former Supreme Leader of Iran Ayatollah Khamenei had also called for the sympathy, assistance, and inter-cooperation of all Muslim nations, including Pakistan.

== History ==
=== Antiquity ===
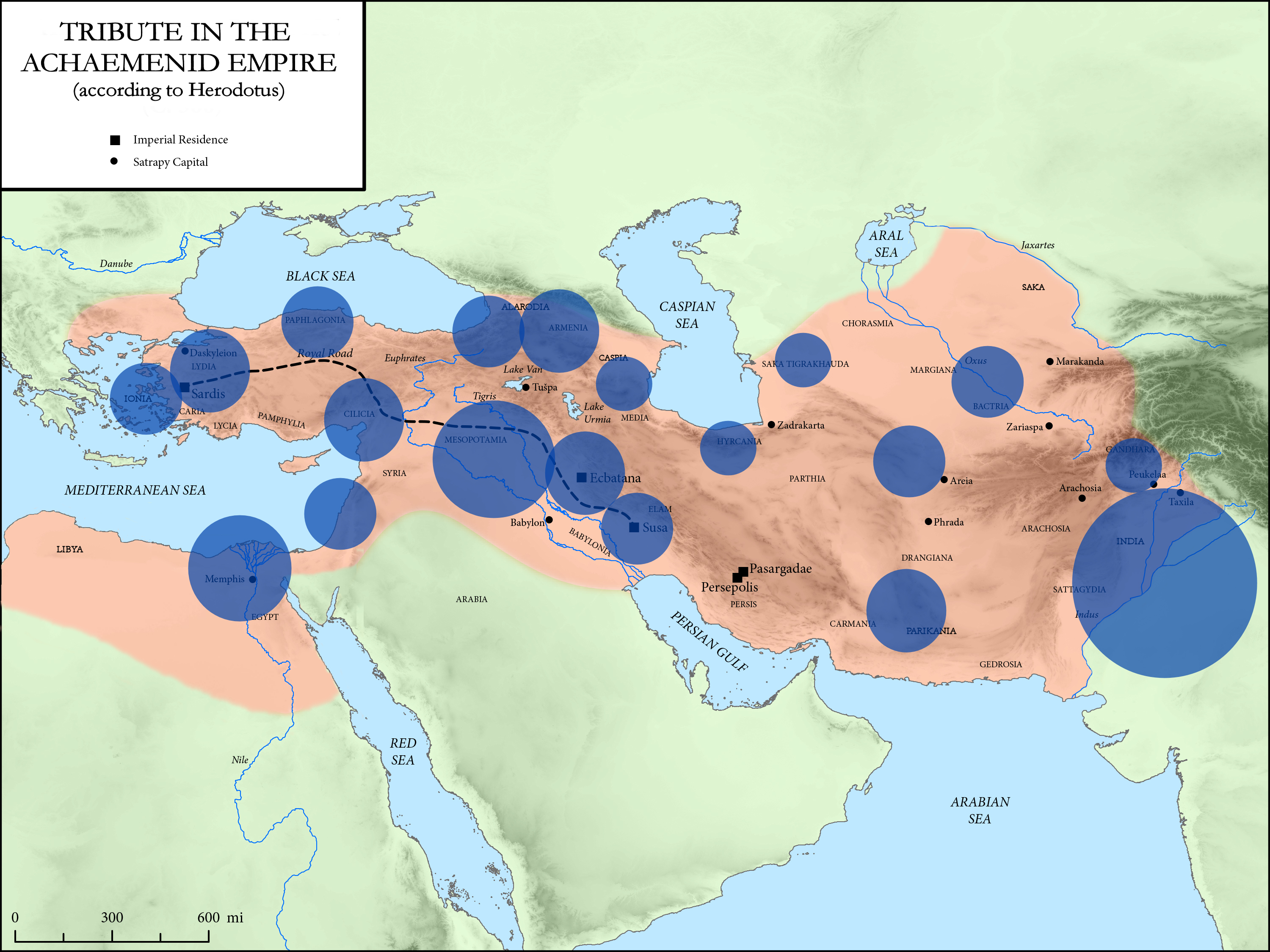
Map showing the distribution of Achaemenid tax revenues, according to the Greek historian Herodotus

The regions that comprise today's Iran and Pakistan have been under the rule of contiguous Eurasian polities at various points in history, as Pakistan straddles an intermediary zone between the Iranian Plateau and Indian subcontinent. The Persian Achaemenid Empire, which spanned (among other regions) the area between the Balkans and the area of the Indus River (known to the Persians as Hind) at its height, conquered the regions comprising modern-day Pakistani provinces of Balochistan and Khyber Pakhtunkhwa during the reign of Darius I.

=== Relations before 1971 ===
Imperial Iran maintained close relations with Pakistan during the Cold War, partly owing to their mutual alliance with the United States-led Western Bloc. Iran was the first country to recognize Pakistan as an independent state, and Shah Mohammad Reza Pahlavi was the first head of any state to make an official state visit to Pakistan (in March 1950). Since 1947, Muhammad Ali Jinnah, the founder of Pakistan, had successfully advocated a policy of fostering cordial relations with the Muslim world and Iran in particular. After Pakistan gained its independence in August 1947, Iran was one of the first countries to recognize its sovereign status.

Shah Pahlavi of Iran making a state visit to Pakistan (1956)

In May 1950, a treaty of friendship was signed by Prime Minister Liaquat Ali Khan and Mohammad Reza Pahlavi. Some of the clauses of the treaty of friendship had wider geopolitical significance. Pakistan found a natural partner in Iran after the Indian government chose to support Egyptian President Gamal Abdel Nasser, who was seeking to export a pan-Arab ideology that threatened many of the more traditional Arab monarchies, a number of which were allied with the Shah of Iran. Harsh V. Pant, a foreign policy writer, noted that Iran was a natural ally and model for Pakistan for other reasons as well. Both countries granted each other MFN status for trade purposes; the Shah offered Iranian oil and gas to Pakistan on generous terms, and the Iranian and Pakistani militaries extensively cooperated to suppress the rebel movement in Baluchistan. During the Shah's era, Iran moved closer to Pakistan in many fields. Pakistan, Iran, and Turkey joined the United States-sponsored Central Treaty Organization, which extended a defensive alliance along with the Soviet Union's southern perimeter. Iran played an important role in the Indo-Pakistani War of 1965, providing Pakistan with nurses, medical supplies, and a gift of 5,000 tons of petroleum. Iran also indicated that it was considering an embargo on oil supplies to India for the duration of the armed conflict. The Indian government firmly believed that Iran had blatantly favoured Pakistan and sought to undermine India during the war. After the suspension of American military aid to Pakistan, Iran was reported to have purchased ninety F-86 Sabrejet fighter planes from West Germany, and subsequently delivered them to Pakistan.

Although Pakistan's decision to join the Central Treaty Organization (CENTO) in 1955 was largely motivated by its security imperatives regarding India, Pakistan did not sign on until Iran was satisfied that the British government was not going to obstruct the nationalization of British oil companies in Iran. According to Dr Mujtaba Razvi, Pakistan likely would not have joined CENTO had Iran been negatively affected during these events.

=== 1970s ===
Iran again played a vital role for Pakistan in the India–Pakistan war of 1971, this time supplying military equipment as well as diplomatic support against India. The Shah described the Indian attack as blatant aggression and interference in Pakistan's domestic/internal affairs; in an interview with a Parisian newspaper he openly acknowledged that "We are one hundred percent behind Pakistan". Iranian Prime Minister Amir-Abbas Hoveida followed suit, saying that "Pakistan has been subjected to violence and force." The Iranian leadership repeatedly expressed its opposition to the dismemberment of Pakistan, fearing it would adversely affect the domestic stability and security of Iran by encouraging Kurdish and Baloch separatists to rise up against the Iranian government. In the same vein, Iran attempted to justify its supplying of arms to Pakistan on the grounds that, in its desperation, Pakistan might fall into the lap of the Chinese (a communist rival to the U.S.-led Western Bloc).

The subsequent breakup of Pakistan in December 1971 convinced Iran that extraordinary effort was needed to protect the stability and territorial integrity of its eastern flank. With the emergence of Bangladesh as a separate state, the "Two-Nation Theory/Pakistan Movement" as well as the state of Pakistan itself had received a severe negative blow to its reputation and questions arose in the Iranian establishment as to whether the residual western part of Pakistan could hold together and remain a single country. Events of this period caused significant perceptional changes in Tehran regarding Pakistan.

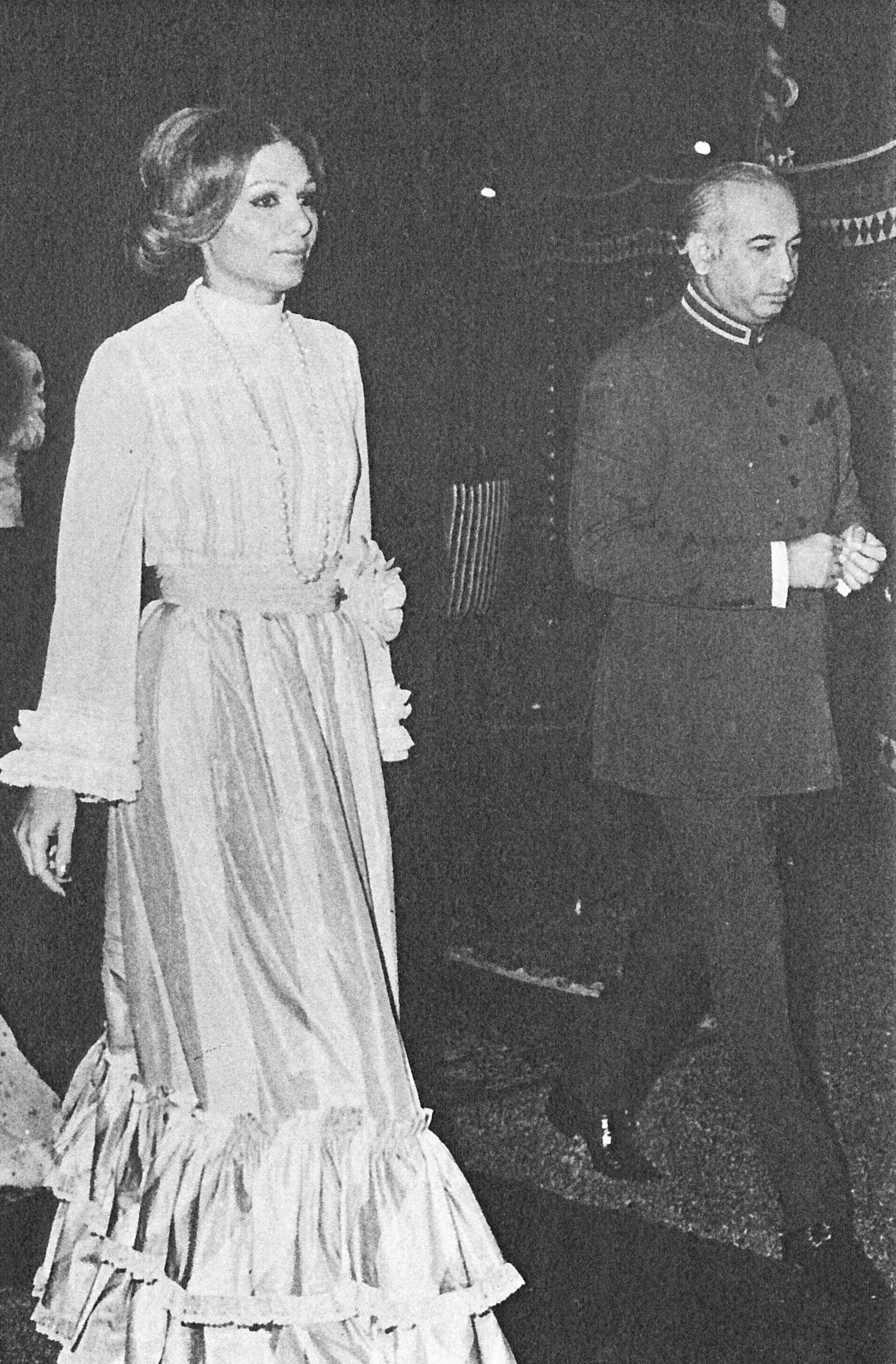
Pakistani President Zulfikar Ali Bhutto meeting with Iranian Queen Farah Pahlavi, 1972

When a widespread armed insurgency broke out in Pakistan's Balochistan province in 1973, Iran, fearing the Baloch insurgency might spill over into its own Sistan and Baluchistan Province, offered large-scale support. Iran provided Pakistan with military hardware (including thirty AH-1 Cobra attack helicopters), intelligence, and $200 million in aid. The government of then-Pakistani Prime Minister Zulfikar Ali Bhutto declared its belief that, as in the 1971 Bangladesh Liberation War, India was once again behind the unrest and uprising of rebels in the Balochistan region. However, the Indian government denied any involvement, and claimed that it was fearful of further balkanisation of the subcontinent. After three years of fighting the uprising was majorly suppressed.

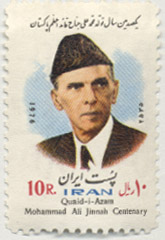
1976 Iranian postage stamp featuring Pakistan's founder, Muhammad Ali Jinnah

In addition to military aid, the Shah of Iran offered considerable developmental aid to Pakistan, including oil and gas on preferential terms. Pakistan was a developing country and small power while Iran, in the 1960-70s, had the world's fifth-largest military, a strong economic/industrial base and was the clear, undisputed regional superpower. However, Iran's total dependence on the United States at that time for its economic development and military build-up had won it hostility from the more Soviet-aligned Arab world. Brief tensions between Iran and Pakistan arose in 1974, when Mohammad Reza Pahlavi refused to attend the Islamic Conference in Lahore because Libyan leader Muammar Gaddafi had been – despite the known hostility between two – invited to it by Pakistan. Later in 1976, Iran again played a vital and influential role by facilitating a rapprochement between Pakistan and Afghanistan.

Iran's reaction to India's surprise 1974 nuclear test detonation (codenamed Smiling Buddha) was muted. During a state visit to Iran in 1977, Pakistani PM Bhutto tried to persuade Pahlavi to support Pakistan's own clandestine atomic bomb project. Although the Shah's response is not officially known, there are indications that he refused to oblige Bhutto.

In July 1977, following political agitation by an opposition alliance, Bhutto was forced out of office in a military coup d'état. The new military dictatorship government, under General Muhammad Zia-ul-Haq, was ideologically ultraconservative and religiously oriented in its nature and approach in contrast to the more secular Iran at the time.

=== Relationship after the Iranian Revolution ===
Bhutto was ousted by General Muhammad Zia-ul-Haq in a military coup. This was followed a half year later by the Iranian Revolution, which established an Islamic republic and overthrew of the Shah of Iran. In 1979, Pakistan was one of the first countries in the world to recognize the new revolutionary regime in Iran. Responding swiftly to this revolutionary change, Foreign Minister of Pakistan Agha Shahi immediately undertook a state visit to Tehran, meeting with his Iranian counterpart Karim Sanjabi on 10 March 1979. Both expressed confidence that Iran and Pakistan were going to march together to a brighter future. Agha Shahi held talks with the Ayatollah, Ruhollah Khomeini, in which developments in the region were discussed.

Iran's supreme leader, Ruhollah Khomeini, withdrew the country from CENTO and ended its association with the United States. Iran and Pakistan had religiously influenced leaders, with Khomeini being a Shia Muslim while Zia being a Sunni Muslim. Despite Shia–Sunni divisions, the common desire for a pan-Islamic identity became an important factor in shaping new Iranian–Pakistani relations. On 11 April 1979, General Zia famously declared that "Khomeini is a symbol of Islamic insurgence". Reciprocating Zia-ul-Haq's sentiments, Khomeini, in a letter, called for Muslim unity. He declared: "Ties with Pakistan are based on Islam." According to the Sahifeh-ye Imam, in May 1988 (15 Shawwal 1408), responding to Zia's greeting card on Eid al-Fitr, Khomeini sent peace and mercy upon Zia.

==== Iranian influence on Pakistan's Shi'a community ====
Relations between Shi'a-majority Iran and Sunni-majority Pakistan became greatly strained due to sectarian tensions in the 1980s, as Pakistani Shi'a Muslims claimed that they were being discriminated against under the Sunni-biased Islamization program being imposed throughout Pakistan by the military dictatorship government of then-President, General Muhammad Zia-ul-Haq. Following the 1979 Islamic Revolution, Iran and Saudi Arabia (considered the "leading state authority" of Shi'a and Sunni Muslims, respectively) gradually began to use Pakistan as a battleground for their proxy sectarian conflict, and Pakistan's support for the Deobandi Taliban movement in Afghanistan during the civil wars in the 1990s became a problem for Shi'a-led Iran, which opposed a Taliban-controlled Afghanistan at the time.

Iranian leaders had sought to extend their sphere of influence into Pakistan and to counter Saudi influence. As such, a pro-Iranian stance amongst many politicized Pakistani Shi'as remains widespread. Many Pakistani Shi'a websites and books are filled with writings advocating the Khomeini regime. Since the 1980s, Pakistan had once again formed close ties with the United States, which it largely maintained for decades until Imran Khan's PTI took power.

=== Pakistani support for Iran during the Iran–Iraq War ===
Iran had a revolution in 1979 and the Ayatollah's threats to export "Red Shi'a" revolutionary influence throughout Iran's neighbouring regions eventually led Saddam Hussein's Sunni-controlled and secular Iraq, backed by the United States and the rest of the Arab world, to invade the country in 1980. The invasion signalled the start of the deadly Iran-Iraq War that would last for eight years until 1988. While Pakistan remained largely neutral, Ruhollah Khomeini's continued threats to export Iranian revolutionary sentiment fuelled tensions between Pakistan's Sunnis and Shi'as. The rising militancy among Shi'a Muslims in neighbouring countries such as Iraq (such as the Hezbollah Movement in Iraq and Badr Brigades), Lebanon (such as Hezbollah), and Afghanistan (Tehran Eight and Abuzar Brigade), inspired by revolutionary Iran, had left many Sunni Muslims in Pakistan feeling deeply threatened. Pakistani President Zia-ul-Haq, despite his pro-Saudi, pro-Sunni and anti-Shi'a sentiments, had to manage his country's security carefully, knowing that Pakistan (due to its alliance with the United States) risked being dragged into a war with its western neighbour, one that it could most likely not afford due to its preoccupations with India in the east. In support of the Gulf Cooperation Council that was formed in 1981, around 40,000 personnel of the Pakistan Armed Forces were stationed in Saudi Arabia to reinforce the internal and external security of the region. The killing of Shi'a pilgrims in the 1987 Mecca incident in Saudi Arabia had met with widespread disturbances and condemnation throughout Pakistan, but Zia-ul-Haq remained firmly neutral and strongly issued orders against engaging any involved parties to Pakistani military personnel stationed in the Gulf. Many U.S.-built Stingers as well as various Chinese weaponry and ammunition shipped to Pakistan primarily for use by the Afghan mujahideen against the Soviets, were instead sold to Iran, which proved to be a defining factor for Iran in the Tanker War against Iraq. Despite immense pressure from the United States and other Arab states, Pakistan never openly supported Iraq and provided operational/financial aid to Iran albeit the deployment of troops in Saudi Arabia was for the sole purpose of defending the country from any potential attacks by the Iranians.

=== Soviet invasion of Afghanistan and the Afghan Civil War ===
In December 1979, the Soviet Union invaded Afghanistan to support the pro-Soviet, communist Afghan government against Islamist uprisings, protect its interests in Central Asia and also as a response to established or growing American influence/dominance in the Middle East – notably in Israel, Iran (until the 1979 revolution), Iraq, and many other Arab states. In 1980, Iraq's invasion of Iran with backing from both superpowers (the United States and the Soviet Union) and other major powers improved an internationally isolated Iran's dysfunctional ties with Pakistan. During the Soviet-Afghan War, Pakistan alongside other major powers such as the United States and China focused its covert support on the Sunni Pashtun groups (such as the Peshawar Seven) while Iran largely supported the Shi'a Hazara and Tajik groups (such as the Tehran Eight), though they were all united as the Afghan Mujahideen in waging war against the Soviet invaders.

After the Soviet withdrawal from Afghanistan and subsequent victory for the Afghan mujahideen, the rivalry between Iran and Pakistan intensified as the mujahideen broke up into multiple factions, no longer needing a union against foreign invaders. After 1989, Iran and Pakistan's policies in Afghanistan became ever more divergent as Pakistan, under Benazir Bhutto, explicitly supported Taliban forces in Afghanistan during the civil wars that erupted after the Soviet-Afghan War ended. This resulted in a major breach, with Iran becoming closer to Pakistan's rival, India. Pakistan's unwavering and continuous support for the Sunni Taliban organization in Afghanistan after the Soviet withdrawal became a problem for Shi'a Iran which opposed a Taliban-controlled Afghanistan. The Pakistani-backed Taliban fought the Iranian-backed Northern Alliance in Afghanistan and gained control of 90 percent of the country, including the capital city of Kabul. The Taliban established the Islamic Emirate of Afghanistan and began imposing ultraconservative and radical Wahhabi rule. As noted by a Pakistani foreign service officer, it was difficult to maintain good relations with Israel, Saudi Arabia, the United States, and Iran at the same time, given each state's back-and-forth rivalry with another, and in particular, Iran's rivalry with all three. In 1995 Bhutto paid a lengthy state visit to Iran, which greatly relaxed relations. At a public meeting, she spoke highly of Iran and Iranian society. However, increasing activity by Shi'a militants in Pakistan strained relations further. This was followed by the Taliban's capture of the city of Mazar-i-Sharif in 1998, in which thousands of Shi'a Muslims were massacred, according to Amnesty International. The most serious breach in relations came in 1998, after Iran accused the Taliban government's forces of taking 11 Iranian diplomats, 35 Iranian truck drivers and an Iranian journalist hostage, and later executing all of them. Iran massed over 300,000 troops on the Afghan–Iranian border and threatened to invade Afghanistan to depose the Taliban, a government which it had never recognized. This strained Iran's relations with Pakistan, which continued to support the Taliban government. In May 1998, Pakistan conducted its first-ever nuclear weapons tests (codenamed Chagai-I), detonating five nuclear weapons at a controlled facility in its Balochistan province in response to Indian tests (codenamed Pokhran-II) a few days earlier, both events would later lead to U.N. sanctions on both Pakistan and India but did not stop either country from continuing to conduct more tests. Pakistan had now become the seventh country in the world to acquire nuclear weapons (after the United States, Soviet Union, United Kingdom, France, China and India). Pakistani Prime Minister Nawaz Sharif acknowledged Pakistan's nuclear capability and tests on 7 September 1997. Iran congratulated Pakistan for its nuclear testing.

=== Bilateral and multilateral visits in the late 1990s ===
In 1995, Pakistani Prime Minister Benazir Bhutto paid a state visit to Iran to lay the groundwork for a memorandum on energy, and begin work on an energy security agreement between the two countries. This was followed by Prime Minister Nawaz Sharif's visit to Tehran for the 8th OIC Summit Conference on 9–11 December 1997. While there, Sharif held talks with Iranian President Mohammad Khatami, with a view to improving bilateral relations, as well as finding a solution to the crisis in Afghanistan.

Chief Executive of Pakistan under a military dictatorship, General Pervez Musharraf paid a two-day visit to Tehran on 8–9 December 1999. This was his first visit to Iran (and third international trip) since his military coup d'état of 12 October 1999 and subsequent seizure of power in Pakistan. In Iran, Musharraf held talks with Iranian President Mohammad Khatami and with the Iranian Supreme Leader Ali Khamenei. This visit was arranged to allow Musharraf to explain the reasons for his takeover in Pakistan.

The meetings included discussions on the situation in Afghanistan, which were intended to lead both countries to "coordinate the policies of our two countries for encouraging the peace process through reconciliation and dialogue among the Afghan parties".

In 1998, Iran accused Pakistan of committing war crimes in Bamyan, Afghanistan, claiming that Pakistani warplanes had bombarded Afghanistan's last Shi'a stronghold in support of the Taliban government. Iran considers northern and western Afghanistan as its sphere of influence since its population is Persian Dari speaking. Pakistan considers southern and eastern Afghanistan as its sphere of influence since it is Pashto and Baloch speaking such as the Khyber Pakhtunkhwa and Balochistan, respectively.

=== Relations since 2000 ===
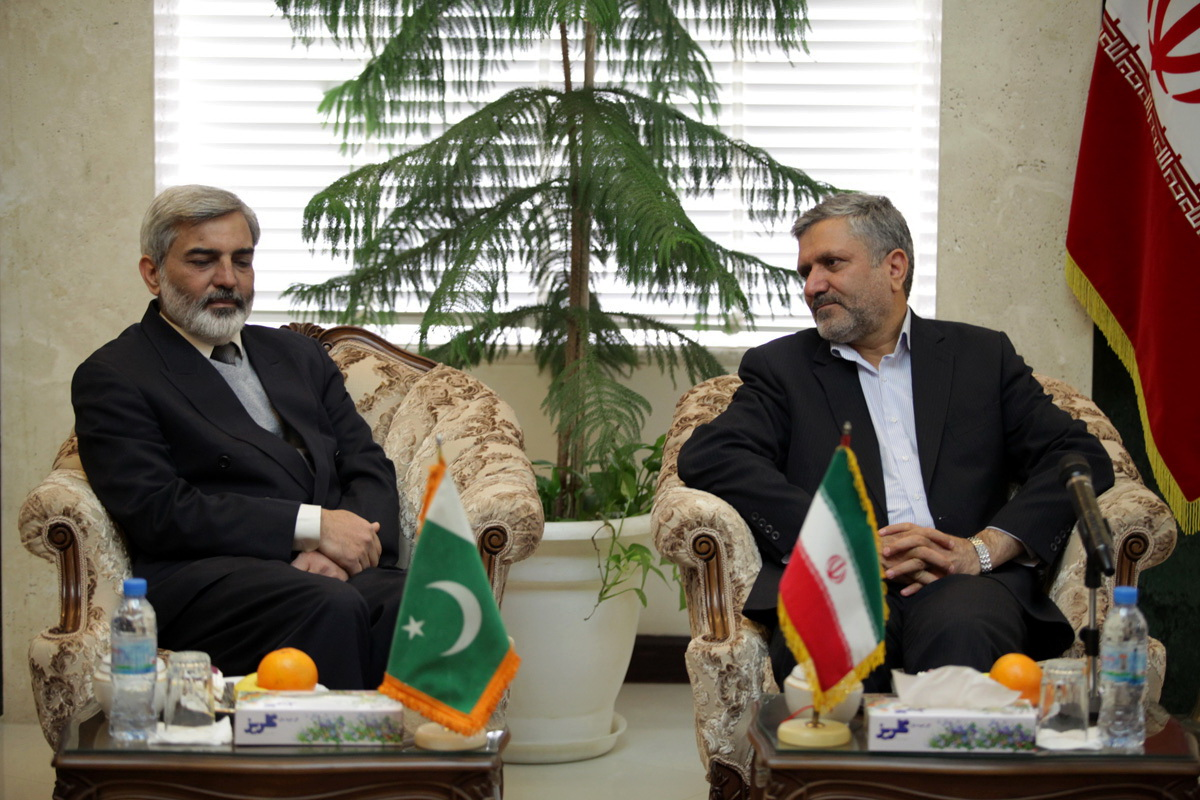
Pakistani Consul-General Qazi Habib ul-Rehman meeting with the mayor of Mashhad, Seyyed Sowlat Mortazavi

Since 2000, relations between Iran and Pakistan have steered towards normalization, and economic cooperation has strengthened. The September 11 attacks on the United States changed the foreign policy priorities of both countries. The George W. Bush administration's tough stance against terrorism following the attacks forced the then-Pakistani President, General Pervez Musharraf to support Washington's war on terror campaign against the Taliban in neighbouring Afghanistan. The subsequent U.S.-led coalition invasion would end the first Taliban regime. Though Iranian officials initially welcomed the invasion and deposition of the Taliban, they soon found themselves encircled by U.S. forces in Pakistan, Afghanistan, Central Asia, and the Persian Gulf.

George W. Bush's inclusion of the Islamic Republic of Iran as part of an "axis of evil" (alongside Iraq and North Korea) also led some Iranian officials to presume that Tehran might be next in line for regime change, ending whatever détente had occurred in Iran–U.S. ties under Mohammad Khatami. Bush's emphasis on transformative diplomacy and democratization accompanied by an aggressive American military campaign worried Iranian leaders further.

Nevertheless, changes in geopolitics have increased strategic convergence between the two countries, With the alienation of Pakistan and the United States, China has become the most important strategic partner of both Iran and Pakistan. Iran has also expressed an interest in joining the China–Pakistan Economic Corridor as part of the larger Belt and Road Initiative. Diplomatic relations between the two countries have recently improved under the policies of former Prime Minister of Pakistan Imran Khan, who sought to expand Pakistan's relationship with Iran, and the two countries' joint support for the stability of Afghanistan following the Taliban takeover in 2021. He also offered to serve as a mediator between Saudi Arabia and Iran in their proxy conflict.

On August 2, 2025, Iranian President Masoud Pezeshkian commenced a two-day delegation to Pakistan, marking his first state visit since taking office. He was accompanied by a high-level delegation that included Vice President Mohammad Reza Aref and Foreign Minister Abbas Araghchi. The visit aimed to strengthen bilateral cooperation across key strategic sectors including trade, infrastructure, border security, and cultural exchange.

During the visit, officials from both countries signed 12 agreements and memoranda of understanding covering areas such as commerce, energy, technology, cultural exchange, and mass media cooperation. Central to the economic discussions was a mutual objective to raise the volume of bilateral trade to approximately US$10 billion, significantly higher than the existing levels, which are estimated at US$3 billion annually.

On 8 April 2026, Pakistan brokered a ceasefire between Iran and the United States amidst the 2026 Iran war. Pakistan hosted the Islamabad Talks between the two countries to stabilize the ceasefire.

== Military relations and security cooperation ==
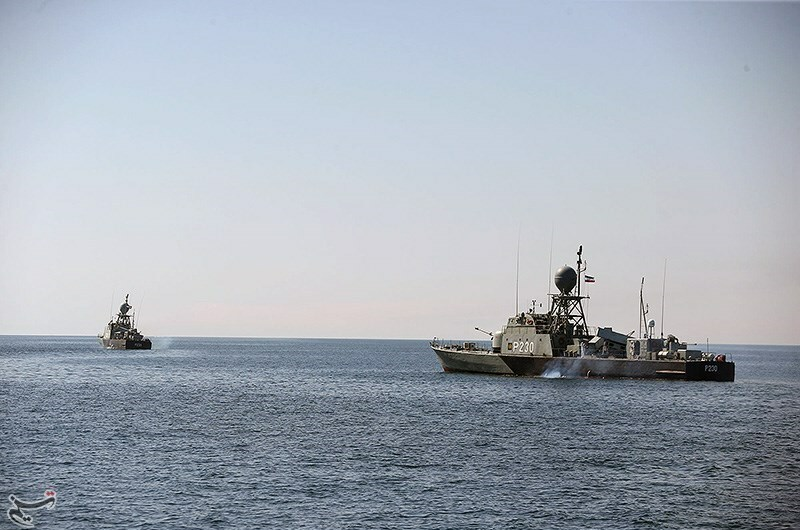
2014 Iran-Pakistan naval exercise.

External videos
- Strict exchange of words between Iranian revolutionary border guards and Pakistan Frontier Corps (FC) Balochistan

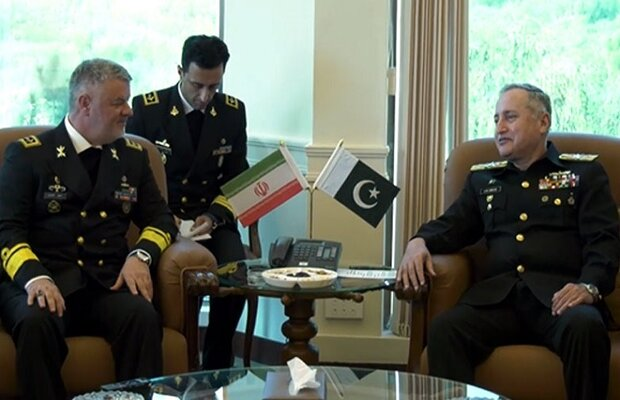
Iranian Navy Commander Rear Admiral Hossein Khanzadi and Pakistan's Naval Chief Admiral Zafar Mahmood Abbasi discussed cooperation in the maritime sector, December 2019.

Iranian support for Pakistan dates back to the 1960s when Iran supplied Pakistan with American military weaponry and spare parts after America cut off their military aid to Pakistan. After the 1971 Indo-Pakistani War, the new Prime Minister Zulfikar Ali Bhutto immediately withdrew Pakistan from CENTO and SEATO after Bhutto thought that the military alliances failed to protect or appropriately assist Pakistan and instead alienated the Soviet Union. A serious military cooperation took place during the Balochistan insurgency phases against the armed separatist movement in 1974–1977. Around 100,000 Pakistan and Iranian troops were involved in quelling the separatist organizations in Balochistan and successfully put the resistance down in 1978–1080. In May 2014, the two countries agreed to joint operations against terrorists and drug traffickers in the border regions.

Despite complex ties between the two neighbours have been shaped by bilateral security concerns and strategic interests, defense cooperation between Pakistan and Iran is strengthening as Pakistan draws closer to China. Iran and Pakistan are both members of the Shanghai Cooperation Organization, the Trilateral Consultation between China, Pakistan and Iran are also committed to counter-terrorism and security cooperation. The navies of Pakistan and Iran regularly hold joint exercises in the Arabian Sea.

Iran and Pakistan have agreed to strengthen defense ties and jointly produce military hardware. The Iranian air force has ordered approximately 25 MFI-17 Mushshaks from Pakistan.

On 16 June 2025, during the Twelve-Day War, Iranian commander and national security council member Mohsen Rezaee claimed on state television that Pakistan has assured Iran it would launch a nuclear strike on Israel if Israel were to use nuclear weapons against Iran. Rezaee also said Iran possesses "undisclosed" military capabilities. However, Pakistan's Defence Minister Khawaja Muhammad Asif dismissed the claim. On the same day, Pakistan closed all border crossings with Iran in light of heightened tensions and escalations between Iran and Israel. Iranian parliament members, as well as President Pezeshkian, thanked Pakistan for its pro-Iran stance in the war.

=== Balochistan conflict ===
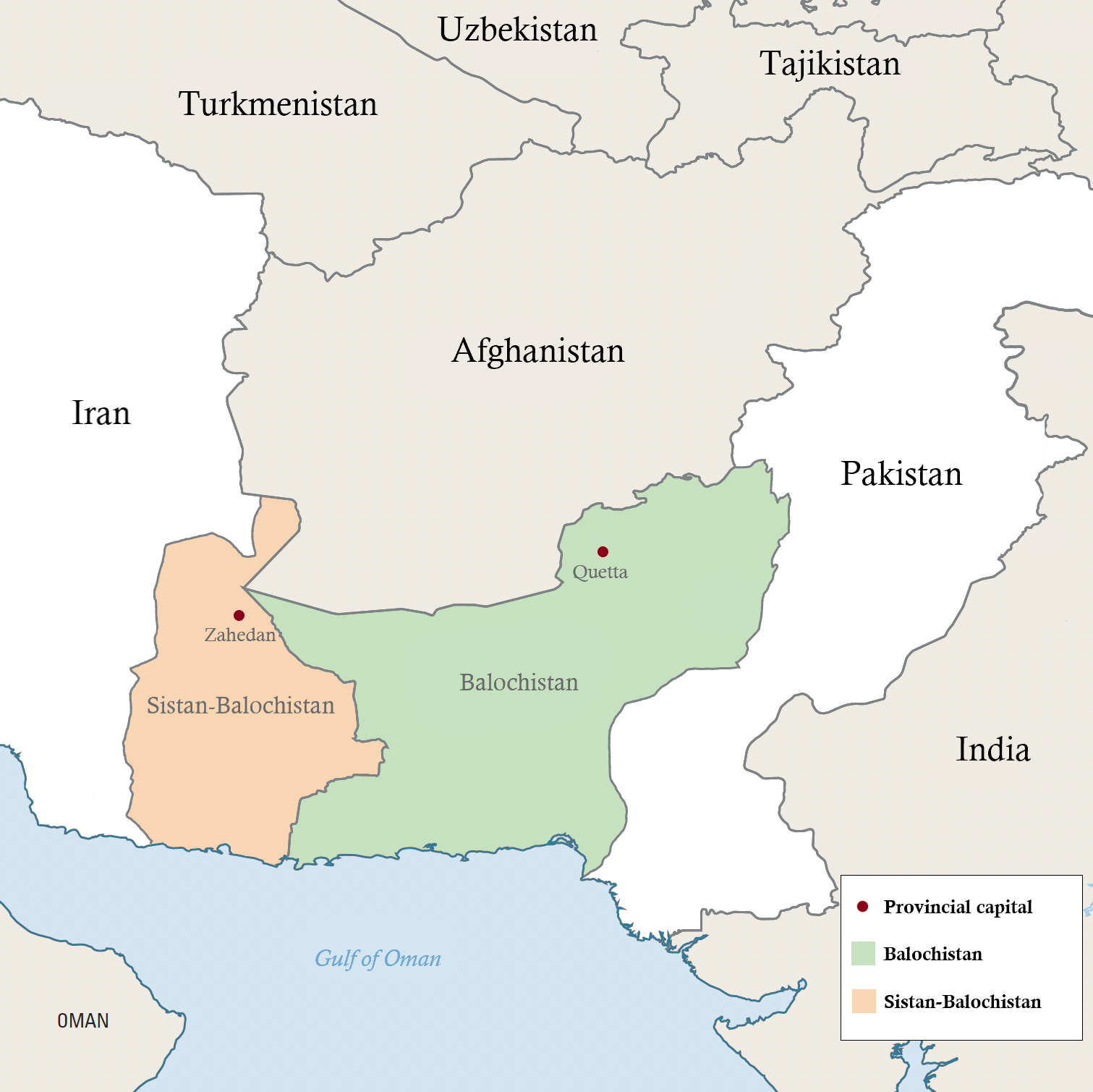
Map of the Sistan and Balochistan province of Iran and the Balochistan province of Pakistan

Both Iran and Pakistan face attacks by Baloch separatist militants in restive Balochistan region, leading to souring relations and mutual recriminations. The Balochistan Liberation Army (BLA) and the Jaysh al-Adl have often accused of operating in each other's territory.

In 2019, following a suicide bombing in Khash–Zahedan which killed 27 Islamic Revolutionary Guard Corps and wounded 13 others, Iranian officials criticized Pakistan. Iranian Major General Mohammad Ali Jafari asked Pakistan to conduct a crackdown against armed group Jaish ul-Adl before Tehran takes revenge on the group. In February 2019, Bahram Ghasemi, speaking for the Foreign Ministry of Iran, said it would not tolerate what it saw as Pakistan's "inability to stop cross-border attacks in Iran". Pakistan, in turn, offered Iran cooperation in investigating the bombing and expressed sympathy for the victims of the attack. A Pakistani delegation was due to travel to Iran. On 12 May 2020 following a terrorist attack on the Pakistan-Iran border which killed six Pakistani soldiers and injured 1, COAS General Qamar Javed Bajwa and Chief of General Staff of the Armed Forces of the Islamic Republic of Iran Mohammad Bagheri had a telephonic conversation in which both commanders discussed ways to deal with the current ongoing COVID-19 pandemic and border security and then agreed to enhance border security.

In September 2021, the Pakistani military said one of its soldiers was killed and another soldier was injured in an attack that "targeted a Frontier Corps border post from Iranian territory". No group claimed responsibility and Iranian authorities did not comment. In June 2023, there was a terrorist attack at the Iran Pakistan border. Some Pakistan border patrol officers were killed. A few days before that, there was another terrorist attack at the border and 5 Iranian border patrol officers were killed.

On 16 January 2024, Iran carried out an operation targeting the headquarters of Balochi terrorist group Jaysh al-Adl with drone and missile strikes, on Pakistani soil, killing 2 children. This prompted the retaliatory operation "Marg Bar Saramchar" from Pakistan on 18 January 2024, targeting terrorists in the Iranian province of Sistan and Baluchistan, killing 4 children and 3 women, following warning of consequences for impeding on Pakistan's airspace and sovereignty, and dissolving diplomatic relations with Iran. Pakistan claimed that "2 innocent children were killed". The spokesperson for the Foreign ministry of Affairs of Pakistan stated "Pakistan reserves the right to respond to this illegal act". On 17 January 2024, Pakistan announced the return of its ambassador in protest against the missiles and drones Iran launched into its territory the prior day. Later that day, Pakistan claimed responsibility for a series of explosions in a village within the Sistan-Baluchistan province, which borders Pakistan. Like Iran, Pakistan claimed to be targeting terrorists, specifically Baluchi militant groups.

In late 2024, both countries agreed to work together to put down the Baloch Insurgency. On 5 November 2024, a joint military operation between Pakistan and Iran killed 12 Jaysh al-Adl militants, including Salahuddin Farooqui, the group's founder and leader. The second-in-command and third-in-command were also among the dead.

On 14 April 2025, eight Pakistani nationals were killed in Iran's Sistan-Baluchestan province, near the border with Pakistan. The victims were found in Mehrestan County, though their identities and the circumstances of their deaths remained under investigation. The Pakistani Embassy in Tehran cooperated with Iranian authorities to repatriate the bodies. The incident followed the series of cross-border tensions between Iran and Jaish al-Adl militants inside Pakistan, and between Pakistan and the Baloch Liberation Front and Army within Iran. Both militant groups operate in the restive, underdeveloped, and resource-rich border regions of Pakistan's Balochistan and Iran's Sistan-Baluchestan.

== Economic perspective ==
Due to international sanctions and poor infrastructure in border areas, the potential of bilateral trade has not been fully realized, and there are problems with smuggling and drug trafficking.

=== Preferential Trade Agreement ===
In 2005, Iran and Pakistan had conducted US$500 million of trade. The land border at Taftan is the conduit for trade in electricity and oil. Iran is extending its railway network towards Taftan.

Trade between the two countries has increased by £1.4 billion in 2009. In 2007–08, annual Pakistan merchandise trade with Iran consisted of $256 million in imports and $218.6 million in export, according to WTO.

=== Bilateral trade ===
On 12 January 2001, Pakistan and Iran formed a "Pakistan-Iran Joint Business Council" (PIJB) body on trade disputes. The body works on to encourage the privatization in Pakistan and economic liberalization on both sides of the countries. In 2012, the bilateral trade exceeded $3 billion. Official figures from the State Bank of Pakistan for the fiscal year 2011–12 indicate imports of $124 million and exports of $131 million, which had collapsed to $36 million of exports to Iran and less than $1 million of imports for the year to April 2015. In 2011, the trade between Iran and Pakistan stood at less than $1 billion and the common geographical borders, as well as religious affinities, are among other factors, which give impetus to an enhanced level of trade. According to the media reports, Iran is the second-largest market of Basmati rice of Pakistan, ranking after Iraq.

In 2023, Iran and Pakistan opened their first border market. There will be another dozen border markets built.

=== Belt and Road Initiative ===
Both Iran and Pakistan maintain strategic partnerships with China, a 25-year strategic deal between China and Iran is considered beneficial to Pakistan and Chinese government welcomes Iran's active participation in the China–Pakistan Economic Corridor.

Lufthansa is served from Tehran Airport and a number of Pakistanis travel over to take it for business travel to the EU. Germany provides the only Western airline in Iran and the United Kingdom provides the only Western airline in Pakistan.

=== Techno-Entrepreneurship ===
Momentum of improvement of economic and political relationships between Iran and Pakistan has created a wave of bilateral agreements between Iranian and Pakistan authorities. Techno-entrepreneurship is the highly trending topic of discussion in the global development and in ECO region (Pakistan-Iran-Turkey), a lot of joint projects have been executed since 2016. ScienceTech+ Center was the first joint techno-entrepreneurship center, which was established by the Pakistani and Iranian entrepreneurs in a joint agreement between CODE Entrepreneurship Consultants Ltd (Pakistan) and Ideparvaran MashreghQazal Ltd (Iran). Several events under this platform are being organized by the [Pakistani in Iran] and Iranian authorities under the title of KarafarinShow in Iran, Pakistan and Turkey.

=== Impacts of US sanctions on Iran ===
The Iran-Pakistan-India pipeline (IPI Pipeline) is currently under discussion; though India backed out from the project. India has resisted joining the IPI, insisting that it pay for gas delivered through the pipeline only upon delivery in India due to threats of terrorism from Pakistan. In addition, the international sanctions on Iran due to its controversial nuclear program could also become a factor in derailing IPI pipeline project altogether.

The U.S. economic sanctions on Iran regarding their nuclear program generally affected Pakistan's industrial sector. The fruit industry of Pakistan has reportedly lost a lucrative market in Iran, where at least 30,000 tons of mango were exported previously, as a result of the trade embargo imposed by the United States on Tehran. According to the statistics by Pakistan, the fruit industry and the exporters could not export around $10 million worth of mango during the current season. The Ministry of Commerce (MoCom) has been in direct contact with the US Department of Agriculture to resolve the issue through diplomatic channels.

=== Border crossings ===
On 16 March 2020, Pakistan closed its border with Afghanistan and Iran due to the escalating COVID-19 pandemic in South Asia and Western Asia. In combination with the ongoing U.S. sanctions against Iran, the trade between the two countries especially for agricultural products was negatively affected. By July 2020 however, the borders were re-opened for a limited amount of traffic to ensure the most necessary exchange of goods. On 19 December 2020, after a visit of Mohammad Javad Zarif in Pakistan, the Rimdan-Gabd border gateway was created to further bolster business and trade between the two neighboring countries.

Turkey marked the launch of the Islamabad-Tehran-Istanbul Road Transport Corridor Project, with a welcoming ceremony in Istanbul for a convoy of Pakistani commercial trucks. The first two National Logistics Company (NLC) trucks carrying goods from Pakistan reached Turkey via Iran, under the Transports Internationaux Routiers (TIR) convention. The trucks departed Karachi on 27 September and reached Istanbul on 7 October, completing their 5,300 kilometers (3,293 miles) trip.

During the August 2025 delegation, President Pezeshkian and Prime Minister Shehbaz Sharif discussed infrastructure development, expanding transit options such as railways, highways, and public transportation, as a means to enhance regional connectivity and economic integration.

== Energy ==
=== Iran–Pakistan gas pipeline ===
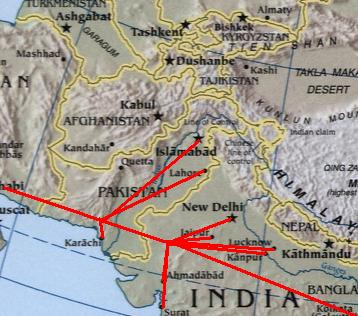
Modified image of Iran-Pakistan-India national gas pipeline.

Discussions between the governments of Iran and Pakistan started in 1994 for the gas pipelines and energy security. A preliminary agreement was signed in 1995 by Prime Minister Benazir Bhutto and Iranian President Akbar Hashemi Rafsanjani, in which, this agreement foresaw construction of a pipeline from South–North Pars gas field to Karachi in Pakistan. Later, Iran made a proposal to extend the pipeline from Pakistan into India. In February 1999, a preliminary agreement between Iran and India was signed.

Iran has the world's second-largest gas reserves, after Russia, but has been trying to develop its oil and gas resources for years, due to sanctions by the West. However, the project could not take off due to different political reasons, including the new gas discoveries in Miano, Sawan and Zamzama gas fields of Pakistan. The Indian concerns on pipeline security and Iranian indecisiveness on different issues, especially prices. The Iran-Pakistan-India (denoted as IPI Pipeline) project was planned in 1995 and after almost 15 years India finally decided to quit the project in 2008 despite severe energy crises in that country.

In February 2007, India and Pakistan agreed to pay Iran US$4.93 per million BTUs (US$4.67/GJ) but some details relating to price adjustment remained open to further negotiation. Since 2008, Pakistan began facing severe criticism from the United States over any kind of energy deal with Iran. Despite delaying for years the negotiations over the IPI gas pipeline project, Pakistan and Iran have finally signed the initial agreement in Tehran in 2009. The project, termed as the peace pipeline by officials from both countries, was signed by President Zardari and President Mahmoud Ahmadinejad of Iran. In 2009, India withdrew from the project over pricing and security issues, and after signing another civilian nuclear deal with the United States in 2008. However, in March 2010 India called on Pakistan and Iran for trilateral talks to be held in May 2010 in Tehran.

According to the initial design of the project, the 2,700 km long pipeline was to cover around 1,100 km in Iran, 1,000 km in Pakistan and around 600 km in India, and the size of the pipeline was estimated to be 56 inches in diameter. However, as India withdrew from the project the size of the pipeline was reduced to 42 inch. In April 2008, Iran expressed interest in the People's Republic of China's participation in the project.

Since as early as in 2005, China and Pakistan are already working on a proposal for laying a trans-Himalayan pipeline to carry Middle Eastern crude oil to western China. Beijing has been pursuing Tehran and Islamabad for its participation in the pipeline project and willing to sign a bilateral agreement with Iran. China and Pakistan are already working on a proposal for laying a trans-Himalayan pipeline to carry Middle Eastern crude oil to western China. In August 2010, Iran invited Bangladesh to join the project.

In February 2024, Pakistan approves construction of long-awaited Iran-Pakistan gas pipeline amid fear of penalty.

=== Electricity transmission ===
Tehran has provided €50 million for laying of 170Km transmission lines for the import of 1000MW of electricity from Iran in 2009. Pakistan is already importing 34MW of electricity daily from Iran. The imported electricity is much cheaper than the electricity produced by the Independent Power Producers (IPPs) because Iran subsidises oil and gas which feed the power plants. Iran has also offered to construct a motorway between Iran and Pakistan connecting the two countries.

In May 2023, Prime Minister Shehbaz Sharif and President Ebrahim Raisi inaugurated the Polan-Gabd electricity transmission line that is expected to supply 100 megawatts of electricity daily to Gwadar.

== Important issues ==
Although Iran and Pakistan have close historical, religious and cultural ties, there are still some obstacles to the development of relations between the two countries. Relations between Iran and Pakistan improved after the removal of the Taliban in 2002. Pakistan has been under a strong influence of Saudi Arabia in its competition with Shia majority Iran for influence across the broader Islamic world, which it already has in its allied nations Lebanon and Syria. The issues of vanishing Pakistani Shias being recruited by Iran for their wars in the Middle East has also remained an obstacle.

=== Iran's view on Kashmir issue ===
A former president of Iran (1981–89), Ayatollah Ali Khamenei succeeded Ayatollah Ruhollah Khomeini as the spiritual head of the Iranian people. A staunch supporter of Iranian President Mahmoud Ahmadinejad, Khamenei is believed to be highly influential in Iran's foreign policy. Khamenei visited Jammu and Kashmir in the early 1980s and delivered a sermon at Srinagar's Jama Mosque.

On 19 November 2010, Iranian Supreme Leader Ali Khamenei appealed to Muslims worldwide to back the freedom struggle in Muslim-majority Jammu and Kashmir, equating the dispute with the ongoing conflicts of the Greater Middle East region.

"Today the major duty of the elite of the Islamic Ummah is to provide help to the Palestinian nation and the besieged people of Gaza, to sympathize and provide assistance to the nations of Afghanistan, Pakistan, Iraq and Kashmir, to engage in struggle and resistance against the aggressions of the United States, the Zionist Regime...". He further said that Muslims should be united and "spread awakening and a sense of responsibility and commitment among Muslim youth throughout Islamic communities".

He said the US was bogged down in Afghanistan and "is hated more than ever before in disaster-stricken Pakistan". The thrust of his speech was directed at Israel, India, and the US, but also made a veiled reference to Pakistan's nuclear program:

"The US and the West are no longer the unquestionable decision-makers of the Middle East that they were two decades ago. Contrary to the situation 20 years ago, nuclear know-how and other complex technologies are no longer considered inaccessible daydreams for Muslim nations of the region."

In 2017, Iran's leader Ayatollah Khamenei said that Kashmiris are being oppressed. He also urged Muslim world to "openly support people of Kashmir and repudiate oppressors and tyrants who attacked people in Ramadan".

By 2019, after India had removed the autonomy of its administered Kashmir, Pakistan's Prime Minister Imran Khan thanked Iran's Supreme Leader, for his support of Pakistan's position on the Kashmir issue.

=== Atoms for Peace cooperation ===
Since 1987, Pakistan has steadily blocked any Iranian acquisition of nuclear weapons; however, Pakistan has wholeheartedly supported Iran's viewpoint on the issue of its nuclear energy program, maintaining that "Iran has the right to develop its nuclear program within the ambit of NPT." In 1987, Pakistan and Iran signed an agreement on civil nuclear energy cooperation, with Zia-Ul-Haq personally visiting Iran as part of its "Atoms for Peace" program.

Internationally, Zia calculated that this cooperation with Iran was purely a "civil matter", necessary for maintaining good relations with Tehran. According to the IAEA, Iran wanted to purchase fuel-cycle technology from Pakistan, but was rebuffed. Zia did not approve any further nuclear deals, but one of Pakistan's senior scientists did secretly hand over a sensitive report on centrifuges in 1987–89.

In 2005, IAEA evidence showed that Pakistani cooperation with Iran's nuclear program was limited to "non-military spheres", and was peaceful. Tehran had offered as much as $5 billion for nuclear weapons technology in 1990, but had been firmly rejected. Centrifuge technology was transferred in 1989; since then, there have been no further atoms for peace agreements.

In 2005, IAEA evidence revealed that the centrifuge designs transferred in 1989 were based on early commercial power plant technology, and were riddled with technical errors; the designs were not evidence of an active nuclear weapons program.

On May 26, 2025, Pakistani Prime Minister Shahbaz Sharif, during a joint press conference with Iranian President Masoud Pezeshkian, announced that Pakistan supports Iran's right to use nuclear energy for peaceful purposes.

=== Non-belligerent policy and official viewpoint ===
Difficulties have included disputes over trade and political position. While Pakistan's foreign policy maintains balanced relations with Saudi Arabia, the United States, and the European Union, Iran tends to warn against it, and raised concerns about Pakistan's absolute backing of the Taliban during the fourth phase of civil war in Afghanistan in the last years of the 20th century. Through a progressive reconciliation and chaotic diplomacy, both countries come closer to each other in the last few years. In the changing security environment, Pakistan and Iran boosted their ties by maintaining the warmth in the relationship without taking into account the pressures from international actors.

On Iran's nuclear program and its own relations with Iran, Pakistan adopted a policy of neutrality and played a subsequent non-belligerent role in easing the tension in the region. Since 2006, Pakistan has been strategically advising Iran on multiple occasions to counter the international pressure on its nuclear program to subsequently work on civil nuclear power, instead of an active nuclear weapons program. On international front, Pakistan has been a great advocate for Iranian usage of nuclear energy for economics and civil infrastructure while it steadily stop any Iranian acquisition of nuclear weapons, fearing another nuclear-armed race with Saudi Arabia.

In a speech at Harvard University in 2010, Pakistan's foreign minister Shah Mehmood Qureshi justified Iran's nuclear program as peaceful and argued that Iran had "no justification" to pursue nuclear weapons, citing the lack of any immediate threat to Iran, and urged Iran to "embrace overtures" from the United States. Qureshi also observed that Iran had signed the Nuclear Non-Proliferation Treaty and should respect the treaty.

Iran and Pakistan have been described as competitors for influence in the Middle East by some geo-political analysts, who argue a nuclear-armed Iran could further agitate Pakistan.

Both countries also have a history of mutual distrust, accusing each other of supporting religious and ethnic rebels within each other's borders.

=== Oil smuggling ===
According to a 2023 report, large-scale Iranian oil smuggling into Pakistan occurred through border areas of Balochistan, with nationwide distribution via routes such as Dera Ghazi Khan. The report estimated that about 10 million liters were smuggled monthly, facilitated by weak enforcement, and alleged the involvement of 90 government officials and 29 politicians, as well as petrol pump owners. More than 2.8 billion liters were being smuggled annually, causing economic losses exceeding PKR 60 billion. With about 76 dealers involved, the proceeds from the smuggling have also been used by terrorists.

=== Flood relief ===
During the 2019 Iran floods, Pakistan's National Disaster Management Authority, on the order of the country's Prime Minister Imran Khan sent 32 tonnes of relief goods to Iran. The consignment comprising two shipments contained 500 tents, 3,300 blankets and emergency medical kits. The relief goods were transferred using two C-130 aircraft. Previously Pakistan's Foreign Office (FO) spokesperson, Dr. Muhammad Faisal, condoled with the families of the victims. The spokesperson further claimed that Pakistan is ready to provide humanitarian assistance to Iran in the rescue effort. He claimed that people of Pakistan stand in solidarity with Iranian people in their difficult time.

=== Immigration ===
In the Balochistan region of southeastern Iran and western Pakistan, the Balochi people routinely travel the area with little regard for the official border, causing considerable problems for the Iranian Guards Corps and the Frontier Corps of Pakistan. Both countries have ongoing conflicts with Balochi separatist groups. However, some tensions have remained.

Since 2010, there has been an increase in meetings between senior figures of both governments as they attempt to find a regional solution to the Afghan war and continue discussions on a proposed Iran–Pakistan gas pipeline and an Economic Cooperation Organization.

Iranian media delegations have been visiting Pakistan annually since 2004, with many journalists settling in Pakistan. These visits have played an effective role in promoting mutual understanding and projecting a positive image of Pakistan in Iran.

Notable Pakistani political figures Benazir, Murtaza, and Shahnawaz Bhutto were half Iranian Kurds on their mother's side. Nahid Mirza, the First Lady of Pakistan, was an Iranian.

=== Agricultural Cooperation ===
Iran and Pakistan, owing to their complementary climates and shared border, possess significant potential for agricultural cooperation. Bilateral trade includes Iranian exports of fruits, nuts, and dairy products, as well as Pakistani exports of rice, corn, and meat.

Experts argue that sustainable relations require moving beyond seasonal exchanges toward joint investments, contract farming, and increased private sector involvement. In this context, both countries have emphasized reducing trade barriers, establishing a joint agricultural committee, and raising bilateral trade to $10 billion.

== Cultural relations ==
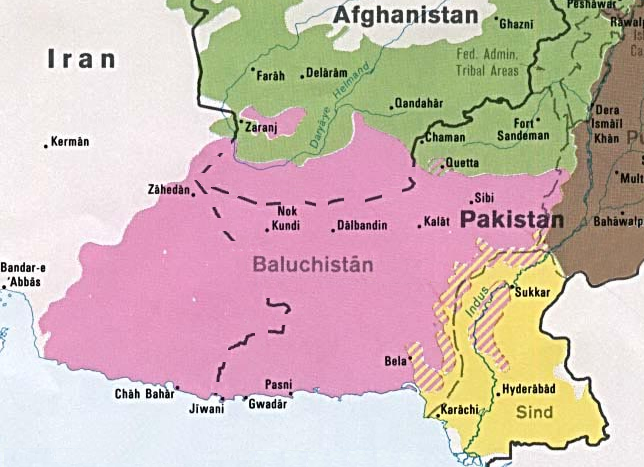
Balochi culture plays a special role in cultural exchanges at the border

Pakistan and Iran share great cultural and religious affinity. Iran's historical influence on Pakistan continues to be seen positively, though the modern increase of Islamic radicalism and Arab influences on Pakistan have created some divergence.

=== Education ===
The two countries regularly carry out academic exchange activities, thousands of Pakistani students are studying culture, science and religion in Iran. The Pakistan International School and College – Tehran aims to serve and accommodate additional educational needs for Pakistani families living in Tehran.

=== Language ===
Urdu has a strong influence from Persian. The name Pakistan, which can be translated as "Land of the Pure", relates to the Persian word pak, which means pure.

=== Sport ===
Football is the most popular sport played in the border regions. Cricket is also played to some extent in Iranian Balochistan; most of the Iranian national cricket team is Balochi, and Iranian cricket was established in Sistan and Baluchestan province in 1981 by Pakistani nationals. The game became popular through contact between neighbouring Iranian and Pakistani cities, such as Chabahar and Gwadar, Saravan and Panjgur, Zahedan and Quetta.

== Diplomacy and role in mediation ==
=== Diplomatic agent ===
Since Iran has no diplomatic relations with the United States; the Iranian interests section in the United States is represented by the Embassy of Pakistan in Washington. Iranian nuclear scientist, Shahram Amiri, thought to have been abducted by CIA from Saudi Arabia, took sanctuary in the Pakistan Embassy in Washington, D.C. The Iranian government claimed the United States has trumped-up charges they were involved with the 9/11 attacks.

=== Bilateral visits after 2000 ===
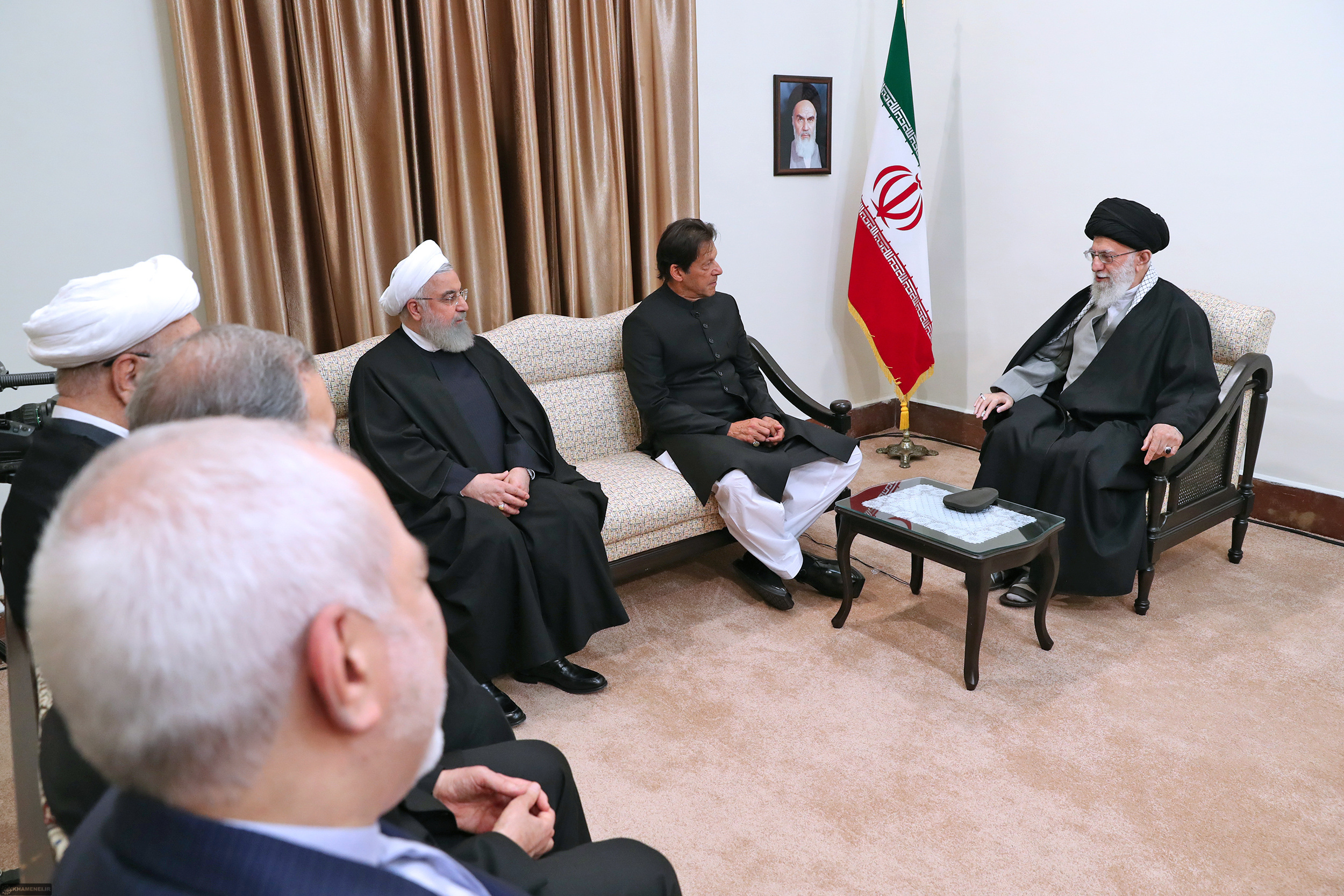
Imran Khan with Ali Khamenei and Hassan Rouhani in 2019

In April 2001, the Secretary of the Supreme National Security Council Hassan Rowhani paid a state visit to Pakistan and met with Pervez Musharraf and his cabinet. During this visit, Iran and Pakistan agreed to put their differences aside and agree on a broad-based government for Afghanistan.

Iranian Foreign Minister Kamal Kharazi paid a two-day visit to Islamabad from 29 to 30 November 2001. Kharazi met with Pakistani Foreign Minister Abdul Sattar and President Musharraf. Iran and Pakistan vowed to improve their relations, and agreed to help establish a broad-based, multi-ethnic government under U.N. auspices.

The President of Iran, Mohammad Khatami, paid a three-day state visit to Pakistan from 23 to 25 December 2002, the first visit by an Iranian head of government since 1992. It was a high-level delegation, consisting of the Iranian cabinet, members of the Iranian parliament, Iranian Vice-president and President Khatami. This visit was meant to provide a new beginning to Iran–Pakistan relations. It would also allow for high-level discussions on the future of the Iran–Pakistan–India pipeline (IPI) project. Khatami met, and had detailed discussions, with both President Musharraf and the new Prime Minister Zafarullah Khan Jamali. Several accords were signed between Iran and Pakistan in this visit. Khatami also delivered a talk on "Dialogue Among Civilizations," at The Institute of Strategic Studies. The presidential delegation initially visited Islamabad, and then followed that up with a visit to Lahore, where Khatami also paid his respects at the tomb of Allama Sir Muhammad Iqbal. A Joint communique was issued by Iran and Pakistan on the conclusion of Khatami's visit. On his return to Tehran, Khatami evaluated the trip as "positive and fruitful".

As in return, Jamali paid a state visit in 2003 where he held talks with economic cooperation, security of the region, and better bilateral ties between Pakistan and Iran. During this visit, Jamali gave valuable advises to Iranian leadership on their nuclear programme "against the backdrop of the country's" negotiations with the International Atomic Energy Agency (IAEA), and measures to strengthen economic relations between the two countries.

On 13 October 2019, Imran Khan and Hassan Rouhani have held talks in Tehran, as part of a Pakistani initiative to defuse rising tensions in the Gulf and mediate between regional foes, Iran and Saudi Arabia.

On 22 April 2024, the then Iranian President Ebrahim Raisi paid a three-day trip to Pakistan to discuss regional and bilateral relations days after Iran and Israel carried out attacks against each other, risking the Gaza war to expand into a regional conflict. Raisi holds talks with top Pakistani leadership, including Prime Minister Shehbaz Sharif, as the two neighbours seek to mend ties after Cross-border missile attacks in January. The Iranian President also visited the Tomb of Allama Iqbal in Lahore.

In August 2025, high-ranking officials from Iran and Pakistan, in the presence of their heads of state, signed twelve cooperation agreements across various fields, including science, technology, transportation, economy, tourism, and agriculture, to strengthen bilateral relations.

=== Diplomatic missions ===
==== Iranian missions in Pakistan ====
Iran's chief diplomatic mission to Pakistan is the Iranian Embassy in Islamabad. The embassy is further supported by many Consulates located throughout in Pakistan. The Iranian government supports Consulates in several major Pakistan's cities including: Karachi^{‡}, Lahore^{‡}, Quetta^{‡}, Peshawar^{‡}. Iranian government maintains a cultural consulate-general, Persian Research Center, and Sada-o-Sima center, all in Islamabad. Other political offices includes cultural centers in Lahore^{†}, Karachi^{†}, Rawalpindi^{†}, Peshawar^{†}, Quetta^{†}, Hyderabad^{†}, and Multan^{†}.

- ‡ denotes mission is Consulate General
- † denotes mission is Khana-e-Farhang (lit. culture center)

There is also an Iran Air corporate office located in Karachi Metropolitan Corporation site.

==== Pakistani missions in Iran ====
Pakistan's chief diplomatic mission to Iran is the Pakistani embassy in Tehran. It is further supported by two consulates-general located throughout Iran. The Pakistani government supports its consulates in Mashhad and Zahidan.

== See also ==
- Iran–Pakistan border
- Iran–Pakistan border skirmishes
- Iranians in Pakistan
- List of ambassadors of Iran to Pakistan
- India-Iran relations
- Iran-Saudi Arabia proxy conflict
- Nuclear program of Iran
- Pakistan Armed Forces— Iranian Contingent
- Pakistanis in Iran
