= Iran Rugby Association =

National governing body for the sport of rugby union in Iran

انجمن راگبی ایران
- Sport: Rugby union
- Founded: 2010; 15 years ago
- World Rugby affiliation: 2020
- Asia Rugby affiliation: 2010
- President: Hassan Mirzaaghabeik
- Website: rugbyiran.ir

The Iran Rugby Association (Persian: انجمن راگبی ایران) is the national governing body for the sport of rugby union in Iran. Its role is to serve as the national governing body charged with achieving and maintaining high levels of quality in all aspects of rugby.

The Rugby, Cricket, Baseball, and Softball Association of the Islamic Republic of Iran was founded in 1993 as a baseball, softball, cricket and rugby union federation. In 2010, it split into associations for baseball and softball, cricket and rugby. It is now an association inside the Iran Federation of Sport Associations which is the governing body for minor sports in Iran.

The Iran Rugby Association joined the International Rugby Board (now World Rugby) as an associate member that same year. It is also a member of the Asian Rugby Football Union (now Asia Rugby). In 2020 the Iran Rugby Association became a full member of World Rugby.
