= Iran Federation of Sport Associations =

Governing body for 21 minor sports in Iran

- Abbreviation: IFSA
- Type: Sports federation
- Headquarters: Tehran, Iran
- Website: www.ifsafed.com

Iran Federation of Sport Associations (Persian: فدراسیون انجمن‌های ورزشی ایران, IFSA) is the governing body for 21 minor sports in Iran.

== Associations ==
Sport	Association	Website
Air sports	Iran Airsports Association	irairsports.ir
Baseball and Softball	Islamic Republic of Iran Baseball and Softball Association	ibasa.ir
Brailletonik	Iran Brailletonik Association	brailletonik.ir
Cricket	Islamic Republic of Iran Cricket Association	
Darts	Islamic Republic of Iran Darts Association	dartsiran.ir
Floorball	Iran Floorball Association	
Jet ski	Islamic Republic of Iran Jet Sports Boating Association	jsba.ir
Kickboxing	WAKO Iran Kickboxing Association	
Muaythai	Islamic Republic of Iran Muay Thai Association	
Orienteering	Islamic Republic of Iran Orienteering Association	jahatyabi.ir
Parkour	Islamic Republic of Iran Freerunning Parkour Association	
Razmsoltan	Islamic Republic of Iran Razmsoltan Association	
Rugby union	Iran Rugby Association	rugbyiran.ir
Savate	Islamic Republic of Iran Savate Association	
Sepak takraw	Iran Sepak Takraw Association	
Spoqcs	Iran Spoqcs Association	spoqcs.ir
Surfing	Islamic Republic of Iran Surfing Association	
Table soccer	Table Soccer Association Islamic Republic of Iran	
Teqball	Islamic Republic of Iran Teqball Association	iranteq.ir
Tug of war	Islamic Republic of Iran Tug of War Association	
Water skiing	Islamic Republic of Iran Waterski Association	iranwaterski.com
