= Zohouri =

Zohouri is a surname. Notable people with the surname include:

- Taghi Zohouri (1912–1992), Iranian actor and comedian
- Masoud Zoohori (born 1964), Iranian-Australian media proprietor and darts player
- Sahar Zohouri (born 1986), Iranian professional darts player
