= Fatemeh Ghafouri Morad =

Iranian darts player (born 1964)

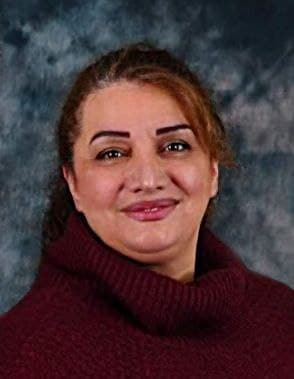

Personal information
- Born: 1964 (age 61–62) Tehran, Iran
- Home town: Tehran, Iran

Sport
- Sport: Darts
- Playing since: 2004
- Laterality: Right-handed

Fatemeh Ghafouri-Morad (Persian: فاطمه غفوری مراد, born 1964) is an Iranian darts player and coach. She was the head coach of the Iranian women national darts team between 2005 and 2008.

== Career ==
Ghafouri Morad is the first Iranian woman to hold a darts coaching certificate from the World Darts Federation (WDF). She is well known as the first-rate darts instructor in Iran. She was the first head coach of Iran Women's National Darts team. In 2006 Asia-Pacific Cup in Malaysia, she led the team including Sahar Zohouri (the first Iranian medal winner in darts) and Marjan Kargar Jeddi (the fifth place in this tournament). She was praised by the Iranian president along with the head of Physical Education Organization because of the won prizes. Ghafouri Morad now lives in Australia.

== See also ==
- Darts in Iran
