= Rugby union in Iran =

Rugby union in Iran is a growing sport.

The Iran Rugby Federation was formed by Alireza Fazlollah A’rabi in 2000 as a part of Baseball Federation of the Islamic Republic of Iran. Iran became a fully fledged member of the International Rugby Board in November 2010.

== History ==
Rugby union was first introduced into Persia by the British military, and it was not uncommon for rich Persians to send their children to British boarding schools.

In more recent times, it has grown through university contacts and has now grown to over 1,000 players, both men and women.

After some years continuous efforts made by society of Iran rugby football together with authorities, today we can see results such as foundation of Iran Rugby Football Union, qualification for Asian competitions and membership in Asian Rugby Football Union (ARFU). http://iranrugby.com/

== Notable players of Iranian descent ==
- Aadel Kardooni, an Iranian who emigrated to the England in the 1980s played for Leicester Tigers and represented England A.
- Josh Navidi is a professional for Cardiff Blues and a Welsh international, he is the Welsh-born son of an Iranian father and Welsh mother.
- Mohammadali Esteki is an Iranian professional rugby player who plays in the Italian top league

== National team ==
The national team currently competes in Division 2 of the 2012 Asian Five Nations alongside Malaysia, China and Thailand.

It has been announced that Iran will be participating in the rugby sevens tournament at the 2010 Asian Games.

== Domestic competitions ==
=== Iranian League ===
The Iranian League is an amateur league which was established in 2002 by Alireza Fazlollah A’rabi

The national league consists of 10 teams, which is played in two separate groups.

== See also ==
- Sport in Iran
- Iran national rugby union team
- Iran national rugby sevens team
- Iran women's national rugby union team (sevens)
