= Islamic Republic of Iran Darts Association =

Iranian Darts Association
- Sport: Darts
- Membership: World Darts Federation, Iran Federation of Sport Associations
- Abbreviation: IDA
- Founded: 2004
- Location: Tehran, Iran
- Other key staff: Masoud Zoohori, Mohammad Amin Azizpour

Iranian Darts Association (IDA) is the official governing body for darts in Iran. It is a member of World Darts Federation and Iran Federation of Sport Associations.

== History ==
Iranian Darts Association (IDA) was founded by the ratification of the Physical Education Organization of Iran (Ministry of Sport and Youth) under the supervision of the Iranian Archery Federation on September 21, 2004. Masoud Zoohori was the founder president of the Association.

The IDA prepared the statutes and regulations in order to hold darts training courses and competitions. Zoohori (IDA President) and Azizpour (IDA Secretary) applied to join the World Darts Federation (WDF). In 2004, WDF invited them to participate in the Federation's convention held in Perth, Australia in 2005, to defend and provide the reasons of applying for membership of the Iran Darts Association to the WDF. In this meeting, the representatives of IDA in response to the questions asked by the members and authorities of the WDF, presented a documentary report collected out of press reports, as well as, videos and photos of darts classes and competitions. In addition, they announced that at the moment nearly 500,000 people are either training or playing this sport in Iran. Finally, in voting for the acceptance of IDA in WDF, all the members from around 55 countries, voted in favor of acceptance and acclaimed IDA because of making darts more popular among all age groups, for about one minute.
