= Masoud Zoohori =

Iranian-Australian media mogul

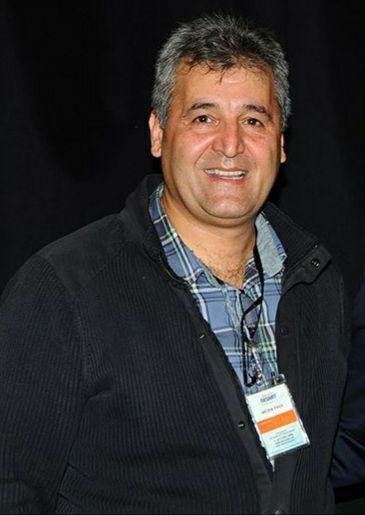
- Occupations: Media proprietor, sports manager
- Years active: 2004–present
- Known for: Founding the Iranian Darts Association
- Children: Sahar Zohouri
- Awards: Victorian Multicultural Awards for Excellence

Masoud Zoohori is an Iranian-Australian media proprietor, darts player and the founder president of Iranian Darts Association. He is the CEO of Radio Neshat. In October 2026, Zoohori received the Victorian Multicultural Awards for Excellence in recognition of his efforts to empower migrants and refugees, promote social cohesion, and foster lasting ties between multicultural communities and Australian institutions through the establishment of Radio Neshat.

== Career ==
Zoohori is one of the founders and promoters of darts in Iran. He was the founder and the first head of Iranian Darts Association. Zoohori has tried to develop a darts community in Iran despite the limitations and restrictions: "Foreigners only play darts in bars and clubs, but we have shown that it can be a sporting activity enjoyed without any alcohol."

== Publications ==
- The Allures of Darts: Methods, Training, Techniques and Tactics, and General Rules and Regulations, Masoud Zoohori, Tehran: Kavoshpardaz 2008, ISBN 978-964-2665-48-8
- The Allures of Darts: Training, Techniques and Tactics, and the Regulations, Masoud Zoohori, Tehran: Bamdad-e Ketab 2009, ISBN 9786009125975
