= Sajeev Koshy =

Indian-born endodontist (born 1956)

Sajeev Koshy AM
- Born: 6 May 1956
- Died: 21 February 2023 (aged 66)
- Education: MDS (Endodontics), MRACDS (Endodontics), MBA (Otago)
- Occupation: Endodontist

Sajeev Koshy AM (6 May 1956 – 21 February 2023) was an Indian-born specialist endodontist residing in Australia. He was a public dentist, clinical director and a social advocate. He was awarded the Medal of the Order of Australia (OAM) in 2016 and promoted to Member (AM) in 2025.

== Education ==
Koshy completed his schooling from St Joseph's High School, and graduated from Mar Ivanios College, Thiruvananthapuram, Kerala, India. He completed his Bachelor of Dental Surgery degree from Kerala University, Thiruvananthapuram, and was the President of the Kerala Dental Students Association in 1978.

He was an MDS in Endodontics, an MBA from the University of Otago, New Zealand, and an MRACDS (Endo) conferred by the Royal Australian College of Dental Surgeons. He was a graduate of the Australian Institute of Company Directors. Koshy also has an academic title with Griffith University.

== Career ==
From 1995 to 1996, Koshy was the President of the Indian Dental Association Kerala. Koshy also served as the president of Kerala Dental Council, the statutory body for dental registration and regulation in the State of Kerala, with more than 20,000 registered dentists. He was first elected as a council member and after three years, was elected as the Chairman of the Council consecutively for three five-year terms. He resigned in 1998 when he emigrated to New Zealand. He was the head of Endodontics, Prosthodontics, Implantology, periodontics and Specialist Endodontist at the Royal Dental Hospital Melbourne, Australia, the tertiary teaching hospital in Victoria. Until March 2018, he served as the Clinical Director (Dental) of Plenty Valley Community Health. Dr Koshy also assisted the rural health services in Victoria by working as Director of Dental Services for Boort District Health and for SwanHill District Health Services. Koshy also worked as Clinical Adviser -Dental to the recently amalgamated new Central Highland Rural Health at Hepburn.

== Philanthropy ==
Koshy worked to assist refugees and asylum seekers with oral health care in Victoria. He also worked abroad as a Rotary International dental volunteer with the UNHCR program in Hong Kong for Vietnamese refugees, and Rotary programs with Kikuyu tribes in Kenya, Q'eqchi' Indians in Guatemala, and orphans in Colima, Mexico. He was the clinical advisor for Smile High Foundation which volunteers in Nepal.He was a former member of the Gippsland Dental Task Force Group, facilitated by Dental Health Services Victoria, which drafted the first Gippsland Oral Health Plan in 2008. He was Chair of the North and West Metro Oral Health leadership group for Victoria, and former Board Chair and Director of Platinum Cove Pty Ltd, which is trading as Northern Dental Centre.

== Awards and recognition ==
- Posthumously promoted to Member of the Order of Australia in the 2025 King's Birthday Honours for "significant service to dentistry, particularly through board and leadership roles"
- Appointed by the Victorian Minister for Suburban Development to the Northern Metropolitan partnership as a board member
- Knight of the Order of St John Knights Hospitaller with the title of Chevalier −2021
- Winner of Times NOW & ICICI Bank NRI of the Year Awards 2018 ( Professional Category)
- Recipient Australia Day Awards 2016 – The Medal of the Order of Australia (OAM)
- Appointed by the COAG Ministerial Health Council to the AHPRA National Scheme – Dental Board of Australia since August 2015
- Appointed by the Victorian Health Minister to the Victorian Clinical Council
- Recipient of Victoria's MultiCultural Awards for Excellence in 2012
- Recipient of Victoria's first public oral health care awards in 2010
- Recipient of the 2008 Dentistry Achievement Award of the Australian Dental Association, Victoria
- Winner of the Victorian Health Care Award for the Best Health Care Team in Victoria, 2007
