= Deepak Vinayak =

Indian-Australian community leader (born 1972)

Deepak Vinayak OAM

Personal details
- Born: 8 November 1972 (age 53) Punjab, India
- Spouse: Monica Vinayak (m. 1998)
- Children: 2
- Education: Thapar University, Victoria University
- Profession: Engineer, community leader
- Website: Official website

Deepak Vinayak OAM (born 8 November 1972) is an Indian Australian engineer and community leader from Melbourne. He was appointed as the People of Australia Ambassador by Australian Prime Minister Julia Gillard for two consecutive terms in 2012 and 2013.

== Career ==
Deepak completed BTech in civil engineering from Thapar University, Punjab of India and migrated to Australia in 1996. He has also graduated from Victoria University with a Diploma of Engineering in Advanced Trade. He currently works for the Metro Trains Melbourne. He was appointed People of Australia Ambassador for two times 2012 and 2013 by Australian Prime Minister Julia Gillard. Deepak also has been a four-time Australia Day Ambassador. He was a member of Regional Advisory Council for North and West Metropolitan at Victorian Multicultural Commission, State Government of Victoria.

== Community engagement ==
He founded South Asian Community Link Group-Australasia, South Asian Youth Connect Australasia and Global Organization for People of Indian Origin Chapter in Melbourne to engage with South Asian Australians in Victoria. He has extended support in community work by youth, engaged with multifaith communities, has hosted community gathering to engage policy makers with local community and has partnered in Suicide Prevention. He is also an R U OK and White Ribbon Ambassador. He has been recognised as a Community Champion by Victoria University

== Notable awards ==
- Medal of the Order of Australia (OAM) 2018
- Pride of Australia Medal (2018) Victoria
- Victorian Multicultural Commission, Government of Victoria, Multicultural Champion of Victoria is nominated as a Multicultural Champion for service to multiculturalism in Victoria, 2018
- Australia Day Ambassador for consecutively four times during 2014–17, National Australia Day Council
- Victorian Multicultural Commission, Government of Victoria, Victoria's Multicultural Awards for Excellence in category of Meritorious Service to the Community–Individuals, 2015
- People of Australia Ambassador for two terms, 2012 and 2013, appointed by Prime Minister of Australia
- Victorian Multicultural Commission, Government of Victoria, Victoria's Multicultural Awards for Excellence in category of Service Delivery to Multicultural Community-Individuals, 2010
