= Yaakov Glasman =

Rabbi and communal leader in the Jewish community of Melbourne, Australia

Rabbi Yaakov Glasman AM is a rabbi and communal leader in the Jewish community of Melbourne, Australia.

== Rabbinic career ==
Glasman was a pulpit rabbi at the North Eastern Jewish Centre before taking up the role at St. Kilda Hebrew Congregation, one of Australia's oldest and largest congregations, replacing Rabbi Philip Heilbrunn.

He served as the president of the Rabbinical Council of Victoria (RCV) from 2009-2012 and has been a leading voice on interfaith dialogue. He oversaw the RCV’s guide to multi-faith interactions and presented the first copy to Victorian Premier Ted Baillieu in August 2011. In March 2020 he joined a group of Jewish communal leaders to visit Melbourne’s Lysterfield Mosque on the first anniversary of the Christchurch massacre and in May 2019 Glasman joined Catholic Archbishop Peter Comensoli as joint keynote speakers at a Catholic-Jewish friendship dinner. In November 2011 the Rabbinical Council of Victoria produced a set of guidelines enabling religious volunteers to protect communal institutions on the Sabbath and Jewish festivals in accordance with Jewish Law, a project which followed years of in-depth research and consultation with overseas Jewish legal experts and Melbourne’s Community Security Group.

Glasman has also been an active campaigner against violence against women and was a White Ribbon Ambassador until the White Ribbon organisation closed its doors and campaigned against alcohol abuse within the Jewish community especially during the Jewish community’s religious festivals. When the Organization of Rabbis of Australia (ORA) was closed due to the revelations of the Royal Commission into Institutional Responses to Child Sexual Abuse, Glasman was elected to be the second president of its replacement entity the Rabbinical Council of Australia and New Zealand (RCANZ) following Rabbi Paul Lewin, who served for one year. He held this position until he handed the role over to Rabbi Moshe Gutnick.

Glasman was appointed a Member of the Order of Australia for "significant service to Judaism and interfaith dialogue, to rabbinical bodies, and to the community" in the 2021 Queen's Birthday Honours. In 2023, Glasman was inducted into the Multicultural Honour Role at Victorian Multicultural Awards for Excellence and was short listed for the Premier's Award for Community Harmony. In 2024, he was awarded the Jewish Community Council of Victoria's General Sir John Monash Award for outstanding commitment to the Jewish and wider Victorian community.

== Positions ==
During the Marriage Equality Plebiscite in 2017, while still president of the RCANZ, Glasman took a stand against the RCV who had released a statement saying that all Jews should vote against the proposal. Glasman said that the RCV should not be telling people how to vote on divisive issues. In response to Glasman's statement, Rabbi Chaim Cowen, one of the authors of the statement, resigned from the RCANZ.

During the Royal commission into Institutional Responses to Child Sexual Abuse, Glasman took a consistent stance on the historic wrongs of the covering up of abuse, and was forceful in his view that under Jewish law any knowledge of abuse must be taken to police. Glasman dismissed some of the troubling findings from the Royal Commission as a fringe group within the rabbinic community. One of these claims included they did not know as a fact that it was against the law for an adult to touch the genitals of a minor. Glasman claimed that the rabbinic community had distanced themselves from such claims, and that they were disturbed by them.

In 2025, Glasman was awarded an Honorary Fellowship of Monash University for his work in interfaith dialogue and in 2026 was appointed as Australia's first Jewish Chaplain to the Australian Federal Police.

In 2018, Glasman became the first Jewish religious leader in Australia to present at Tedx Melbourne.
