= Victorian Multicultural Awards for Excellence =

Annual awards recognising contributions to multiculturalism in Victoria, Australia

- Type: State award
- Awarded for: Outstanding contributions to multiculturalism, cultural diversity and social cohesion in Victoria
- Description: Annual awards recognising individuals and organisations for their contributions to multicultural communities in Victoria
- Sponsored by: Victoria State Government
- Date: Annually
- Venue: Various venues in Victoria
- Country: Australia
- Presented by: Victorian Multicultural Commission
- Eligibility: Individuals and organisations contributing to multiculturalism in Victoria
- Reward: Recognition of outstanding contributions to multiculturalism
- Status: Active
- Established: 2002
- First award: 2002
- Website: www.multicultural.vic.gov.au/victorian-multicultural-awards-for-excellence

The Victorian Multicultural Awards for Excellence (MAEs) are annual awards presented by the Victoria State Government to recognise individuals and organisations for their contributions to multiculturalism, cultural diversity and social cohesion. The awards acknowledge achievements in areas including education, media, justice, health, business and community participation.

The awards were established in 2002 and are coordinated by the Victorian Multicultural Commission, now part of Multicultural and Multifaith Victoria.

== Notable winners ==
- Yaakov Glasman
- Tania de Jong
- Sajeev Koshy
- Deepak Vinayak
- Masoud Zoohori

== See also ==
- Multiculturalism in Australia
