= Pakistanis in Iran =

Total population
- ~40,000 (2017)

Regions with significant populations
- Tehran, Mashhad, Qom

Languages
- Urdu · Saraiki · Punjabi · Balochi · Persian · Pashto

Religion
- Shia Islam

Pakistanis in Iran consist of expatriates from Pakistan living in Iran, as well as locally born people with ancestral roots in Pakistan.

According to the Overseas Pakistanis Foundation, their population was estimated to be 11,000 in 2004–2005, while a 2023 academic publication put their numbers at 35,000. While many tend to be students, 3,500 of them as of early 2026, there are a number of white-collar professionals employed in various jobs.

The majority of the population is centred on Tehran and Mashhad. A large number of Shi'a Pakistanis make business travel to Europe via Tehran airport because that is the nearest city served by Lufthansa.

== Notable people ==
- Muhammad Irfan-Maqsood is a Pakistani researcher and entrepreneur. He is known for his work in the field of techno-entrepreneurship and Biotechnology. He holds PhD in Cell and Molecular Biology and holding two MSc (Biotechnology) and MA (Political Sciences-IR). He has been awarded 4 time Iranian national techno-entrepreneurship award Sheikh Bahai by Minister of Science and Research, Iran and Young Entrepreneur from the Deputy Minister for Youth Affairs. He is the only Pakistani and one of three non-Iranian who were enlisted as the most talented non-Iranian in Iran by the office of Vice president of Iran.

== See also ==
- Iran–Pakistan relations
- Pakistani diaspora
- Immigration to Iran
- Iranians in Pakistan
