= Iranians in Pakistan =

Ethnic group in Pakistan

- (Iran) (Pakistan)

Total population
- 10,000 (est. 2017)

Regions with significant populations
- Islamabad, Karachi, Lahore, Peshawar and Quetta.

Languages
- Persian · Balochi · English · Urdu

Religion
- Shia Islam · Sunni Islam · Zoroastrianism · Baháʼí

There are a small number of Iranians in Pakistan, the vast majority of whom live in Karachi and Lahore. Most are students, while others are political asylum seekers, of which the latter are mostly Iranian people.

== Community ==
In Karachi, there are several Iranian restaurants, known as "Iranian cafes", which are run by Iranian families. They speak Persian.

== Notable people ==
Notable Pakistani people of Iranian descent include:

- Aga Khan III
- Nusrat Bhutto, of Kurdish Descent and wife of Zulfiqar Ali Bhutto
- Benazir Bhutto served as the 11th and 13th Prime Minister of Pakistan
- Lady Abdullah Haroon
- Muhammad Ali Shahki
- Abul Hassan Ispahani
- Asghar Ali Ispahani
- Nahid Mirza – wife of Iskander Mirza

== See also ==
- Iran–Pakistan relations
- Pakistanis in Iran
- Iranian diaspora
- Immigration to Pakistan
- Iran-Saudi Arabia proxy conflict in Pakistan
