= Cricket in Iran =

Cricket in Iran is a fledgling sport growing in popularity, especially with youth and women. It is the most popular sport in Sistan and Baluchestan province. Iran has made significant progress in Under-16s and Women's cricket. The Under-16's promoted to and participated at the ACC U-16 Elite Cup in 2012 followed by a participation at the 2014 event. Women's national team promoted to and participated at the ACC Women's Premier Cup in 2014. Iran's playing season runs from September to April. There are 25 cricket clubs.

== History ==
According to F S Ashley Cooper cricket in Iran has been known since 1856 when was first played in Bushire by the British who seized the town in the Anglo-Persian War. Ever since was played by the local Gymkhana, employees of the Indo-European Telegraph Company and teams of Men of War visiting the Persian Gulf.

During the first half of the twentieth century, in South Western Iran was played by the British Armed Forces and the employees of Anglo-Persian Oil Company. They set up cricket teams in Abadan, Masjed Soleyman, Aghajari and Haftkel. Later in the 1940s, due to efforts by Seyed Khalil Kazerooni (an Iranian CEO of the Anglo-Iranian Oil Company who as a school boy played Cricket for St Peter's School, York team in between 1930 and 1935) local Iranian cricket teams were formed by him in Abadan and himself played regularly.

In Tehran was played by employees of Imperial Bank of Persia, Indo-European Telegraph Company during the late nineteenth century and first half of the twentieth century, and post-World War Two by the personnel of the embassies of Great Britain, Australia, India and Pakistan and their citizens who resided in the Iranian capital.

The game was established in Sistan and Baluchestan province in 1981 by Pakistani nationals who lived in the province and became popular through contact between neighbouring Iranian and Pakistani cities, Chabahar and Gwadar, Saravan and Panjgur, Zahedan and Quetta.

In 2003 Hossein Ali Salimian, a former captain of Pakistani cricket teams such as South East Karachi Club and Sarhind Cricket Club and employee of Iran Ministry of Foreign Affairs, established a governing body for cricket which resulted in ACC and ICC affiliations in 2003 and formation of national team in 2004. After that the game slowly gained popularity. The federation of sports associations held a three-stage election campaign of the national team for the selection of the Iranian men's cricket team. The first stage of this election campaign was held in Golestan province with 42 people, the second stage was held in Sistan Baluchestan province with 22 people, and the third stage will be held in the same province with 17 people. Mohammad Yousef Shadzehi is the only representative of the Saravan province in the Iranian men's cricket team who will go on the Asian championship happening in Qatar after passing the last camp. Mohammad Yousef Shadzehi is now known as Mr Cricket of Iran and wants to hold cricket training courses for adolescent age groups in 2019 in Iran, Ukraine, and Poland and part of the income from these training courses will be devoted to the charities related to orphans or unsupervised children. Mohammad Yousef Shadzehi or the so-called Mr Cricket of Iran has been playing cricket for 8 years and was fortunate enough to achieve championship in the city tournament in the form of Ramadan Cup for seven courses. In the provincial tournaments, Mr Cricket of Iran (Mohammad Yousef Shadzehi) has achieved second place twice, championship three times, second place in the international tournaments of peace and friendship, and second place in the national tournaments for two times.

== Governing body ==
Islamic Republic of Iran Cricket Association is the official governing body of cricket in Iran. Its current headquarters is in Tehran.

== Grounds ==
There are currently 15 cricket grounds in Iran.

=== Standard ===
- Peimankar Baharan Park Cricket Ground, Chabahar, Sistan and Baluchestan province – (Under Construction)

=== Non-Standard ===
- Azadi Sport Complex, Tehran
- Shahid Beheshti Stadium, Mashhad
- Shahid Chamran Stadium, Taft
- Shohada Mohiabad Stadium, Gorgan
- Karkhaneh Baft Baluch Cricket Ground, Iranshahr
- Shahrdari Stadium, Iranshahr
- 22 Bahman Stadium, Shiraz
- Bushehr
- Gonbad-e Kavus
- Kerman
- Kermanshah
- Konarak
- Saravan
- Zahedan

== National team ==
The Iran national cricket team represents the country in international cricket matches. The national team, formed in 2004, play in the Challenge division of the ACC Trophy. The team has also played in the ACC Middle East Cup in 2006.

== Women's National team ==
The Iran women's national cricket team represents the country in Women's international cricket matches. The women's national team, formed in 2009, They play in ACC Women's Premier. The team has also played in the ACC Women's Twenty20 Championship in 2009.

== Domestic competitions ==
=== South West Persia Cup ===
Year	Host city	Final		
Year	Host city	Winner	Result	Runner-up
October 1929	Abadan	Abadan	Abadan won by five wickets	Masjed Soleyman

=== National Championship ===
==== Men ====
Team	2001	2002	2003	2004	2005	2006	2007	2008	2009	2010	2011
Bandar Abbas								DSQ			
Golestan											
Fars											
Qom								WRW			
Sistan va Baluchestan "A"								W			
Sistan va Baluchestan "B"								R			
Tehran								3rd			
Yazd											

Notes:
* W = Winner; R = Runner-up;   = 3rd; DNP = Did not play/participate; DSQ = Disqualified; WRW = Withdrew; TBD = To be decided

==== Women ====
Team	2008	2009	2010	2011	2016
Khorasan Razavi	W	R	W	W	R
Golestan				3rd	DNP
Kerman				R	W
Bushehr					3rd
Fars					4th
Isfahan					
Kermanshah					
Sistan va Baluchestan					
Tehran					

Notes:
* W = Winner; R = Runner-up;   = 3rd; DNP = Did not play/participate; TBD = To be decided

=== National League ===
==== Men ====
Team	2013/14
Chabahar	W
Ettehad Taftan (Zahedan)	4th
Foolad Keivan (Yazd)	5th
Heyaat (Golestan)	7th
Liyaghat (Saravan)	3rd
Shahrdari (Konarak)	6th
Tarbiat Badani (Fars)	8th
Varzesh va Javanan (Iranshahr)	R

  Notes:
  * W = Winner; R = Runner-up;   = 3rd; DNP = Did not play/participate; TBD = To be decided

==== Women ====
Team	2013/14
Bazargani Behdashtkar (Mashhad)	W
Dena Azadi (Tehran)	5th
Dena Sport (Tehran)	R
Fajr (Kerman)	3rd
Gonbad-e Kavus	6th
Varzesh Javanan (Sistan va Baluchestan)	4th

 Notes:
 * W = Winner; R = Runner-up;   = 3rd; DNP = Did not play/participate; TBD = To be decided

== International competitions hosted in Iran ==
=== Friendly matches ===
In 2001, a combined team of Chabahar-Konarak hosted a team from Quetta in a friendly match which ended in victory for the Iranians.

=== Fajr Cup ===
Fajr Cup is a cricket tournament hosted by Iran annually in the month of February to celebrate the commemoration of the Iranian revolution. The first tournament took place in 2007. Most years only local teams took part, however some years International teams participated.

The 2008 edition ran from February 24 to March 2, hosted by Chabahar. There were a total of four teams from Iran, Afghanistan, Pakistan and Oman.

The 2009 edition took place in Iranshahr from February 15 to February 23. The final standings of the eight participants were as follow 1.Chabahar 254 Pts, 2. Afghanistan A 191 Pts, 3. Talar Ghasr Islamic Azad University Iranshahr, 4. Karachi XI, 5. Regional Electricity Sistan va Baluchestan Zahedan, 6. Quetta-Panjgur XI, 7. Konarak XI and 8. Saravan XI.

For the event in 2014, Iran Cricket Association had sent invitations to Afghanistan, Pakistan and India to take part alongside Iran national cricket team and Iran U-19.

Season	Champions	Runners-up	Third place	Fourth place	No. of teams
2009	(Iran) Chabahar	Afghanistan "A"	(Iran) Talar Ghasr Islamic Azad University of Iranshahr	(Pakistan) Karachi	8

=== Tehran tournament ===
In 2016, Tehran Tournament ran from April 27 to April 29, hosted at Azadi Sport Complex. There were a total of three teams from Iran and Hong Kong. Chabahar were the champions with 2 wins, Iran selection came second with 1 win and 1 loss, Hong Kong's Craigengower CC finished last with 2 losses.

Season	Champions	Runners-up	Third place	No. of teams
2016	(Iran) Chabahar	Iran XI	(Hong Kong) Craigengower CC	3

=== Shahid Jangi Zehi Memorial tournament ===
In 2016, this tournament was hosted at Kooh-e Mehregan Cricket Ground in Saravan from May 22 to May 25. Referees were Nazar Mohammad Firouzi, Amir Arbab, Rashed Bameri, Sarvar Sepahi and Abdolraouf Molazehi.

Season	Champions	Runners-up	Third place	No. of teams
2016	(Iran) Saravan	(Pakistan) Panjgur	(Iran) Iranshahr	3

== See also ==
- Sport in Iran
