= Rice production in Pakistan =

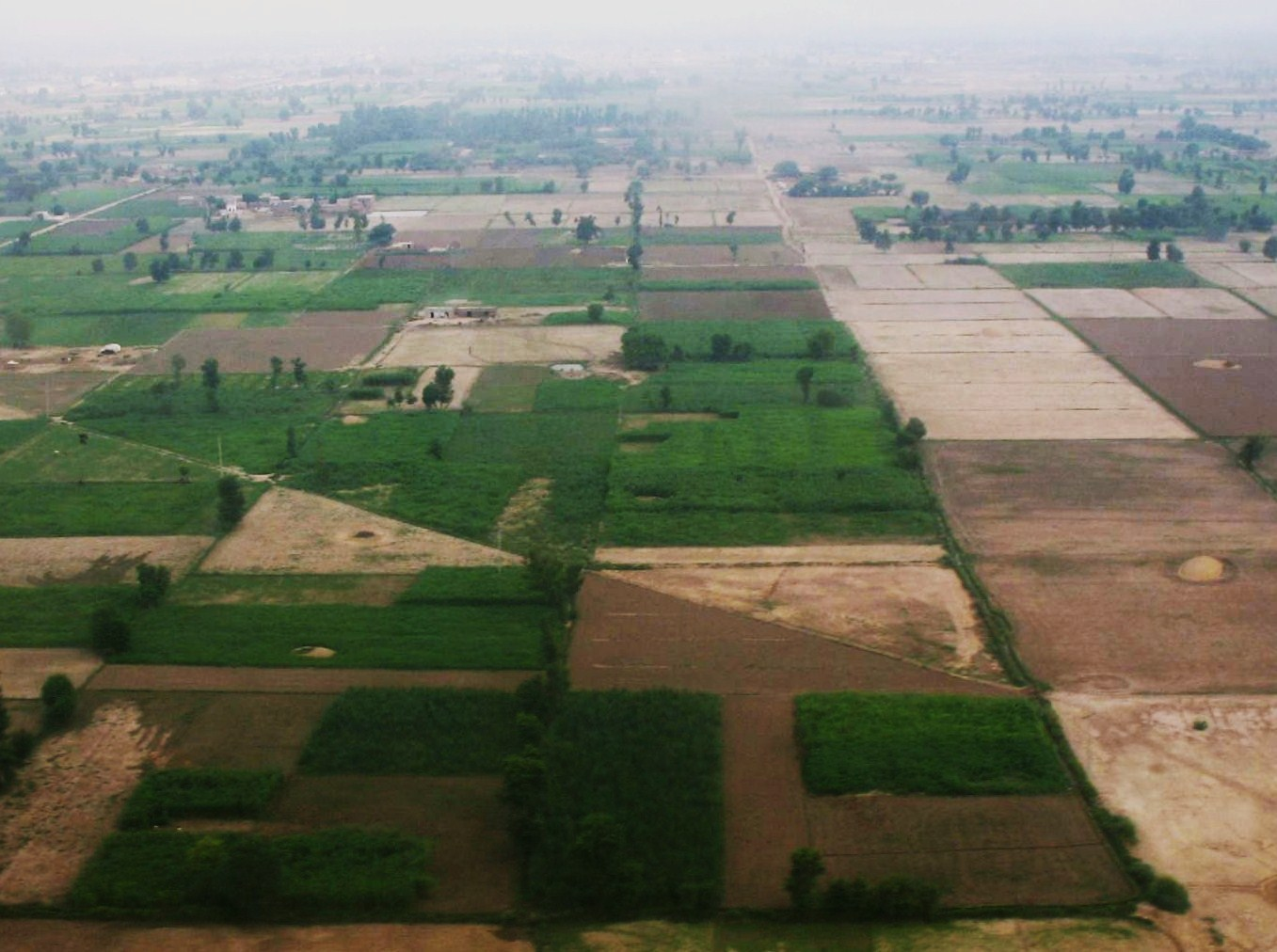
A farm in Faisalabad.

Pakistan holds a significant position in the global rice market and is one of the leading rice-producing countries. The rice sector is crucial for the country's economy, providing livelihoods to a substantial portion of the population and contributing substantially to agricultural exports.

Pakistan is the world's 10th largest producer of rice and its exports make up more than 8% of the world's total rice trade. It is an important crop in the agriculture economy of Pakistan. Rice is an important Kharif crop.

In 2019, Pakistan produced 7.5 million tonnes of rice and ranked 10th among the largest rice-producing countries. Guard Basmati Rice is the oldest and most famous brand of Guard Agricultural Research and Services Limited the first private sector company with its own Rice Research and Development (R&D) facility in Pakistan. In 2016/17, Pakistan produced 6.7 million tonnes, of which around 4 million were exported, mainly to neighbouring countries, the Middle East and Africa. Rice is grown in fertile lands of Punjab, Sindh and Balochistan regions where millions of farmers rely on rice cultivation as their major source of employment. Among the most famous varieties grown in Pakistan include the Basmati, known for its flavour and quality. Pakistan is a major producer of this variety.

Production Volume: Pakistan is a major producer of rice, with a diverse range of varieties including Basmati and non-Basmati rice. The country's total rice production is substantial, contributing significantly to global rice output.

Export Performance: Rice exports constitute a vital component of Pakistan's overall export earnings. The country is particularly renowned for its high-quality Basmati rice, which enjoys demand in international markets. Exports of non-Basmati rice also contribute substantially to foreign exchange earnings.

Cultivation and Varieties: Rice is cultivated across various regions of Pakistan, with different provinces specializing in the production of specific varieties. Basmati rice, famous for its aroma and long grain, is predominantly grown in the Punjab region. Sindh and other areas are known for the production of non-Basmati rice.

Government Initiatives: The government of Pakistan has implemented various policies and initiatives to support the rice sector. These include measures to improve infrastructure, enhance research and development, and facilitate access to credit for farmers.

Global Market Dynamics: Pakistan's rice industry is influenced by global market trends, including changes in demand, international prices, and trade policies of key importing countries. Monitoring and adapting to these dynamics are crucial for sustaining and expanding the country's rice exports.

Pakistan’s basmati rice is loved & celebrated for its unique aroma and long grains, making it a staple in local cuisine. With varieties like Super Basmati and Basmati 1121, it has earned global acclaim, contributing significantly to Pakistan's agricultural economy. Efforts for Geographical Indication (GI) status aim to preserve its authenticity. As a key player in the Basmati rice market, Pakistan ensures quality control for exports, emphasizing its cultural and economic importance.

As per Rice Exporter Association of Pakistan (REAP), the country is expecting a bumper rice crop there will be sufficient stocks available for export. Pakistan achieved $2.7 billion worth of rice exports during FY23, while this year exports will achieve a new record level, having the trade deficit also decreased by 4.5% during the same period. Rice exports likely to touch $3bn mark this fiscal year. In addition, Pakistani rice’s demand has increased in the world market due to ban on rice exports by India.

During the last fiscal year, Pakistan’s rice industry truly came to appreciate the power of price effect. Although export volume was the lowest in a decade – at 3.6 million metric tons of all rice varieties exported – export receipts were second-highest during the same period, and just 14 percent below the peak achieved during the previous year. Unit price of exports was up 16 percent on average during FY23.

Production:

- Land area: 3.15 million hectares (11.7% of total cultivated area)
- Production (milled rice): 9.32 million tonnes (2021/2022) and 5.50 million tonnes (2022/2023)
- Yield: 3.6 MTs/ha (5-year average)
- Contribution to GDP: 0.6%
- Contribution to agricultural value added: 3.0%

Exports:

- Value: US$2.7 billion (2022-2023)
- Expected growth rate: 7.48% (CAGR 2023-2028)
- Volume: 4.5 million tonnes (2022-2023)
- Expected volume growth: 0.3% (2024
- Major markets: Africa, Middle East, Europe

Opportunities:

- Growing global demand:
- Shifting consumer preferences: Increasing demand for high-quality rice like Basmati
- Value addition: Focusing on export of processed rice instead of raw grains
- Sustainable practices: Implementing water-saving techniques and climate-resilient crop varieties.

Hafizabad is known as “City of Rice” and is the biggest rice market in which following types of rice are cultivated: Basmati 385. Basmati 386. Super Karnal.
