= Iran Airsports Association =

Iranian governing body for air sports

Iran Air Sports Association
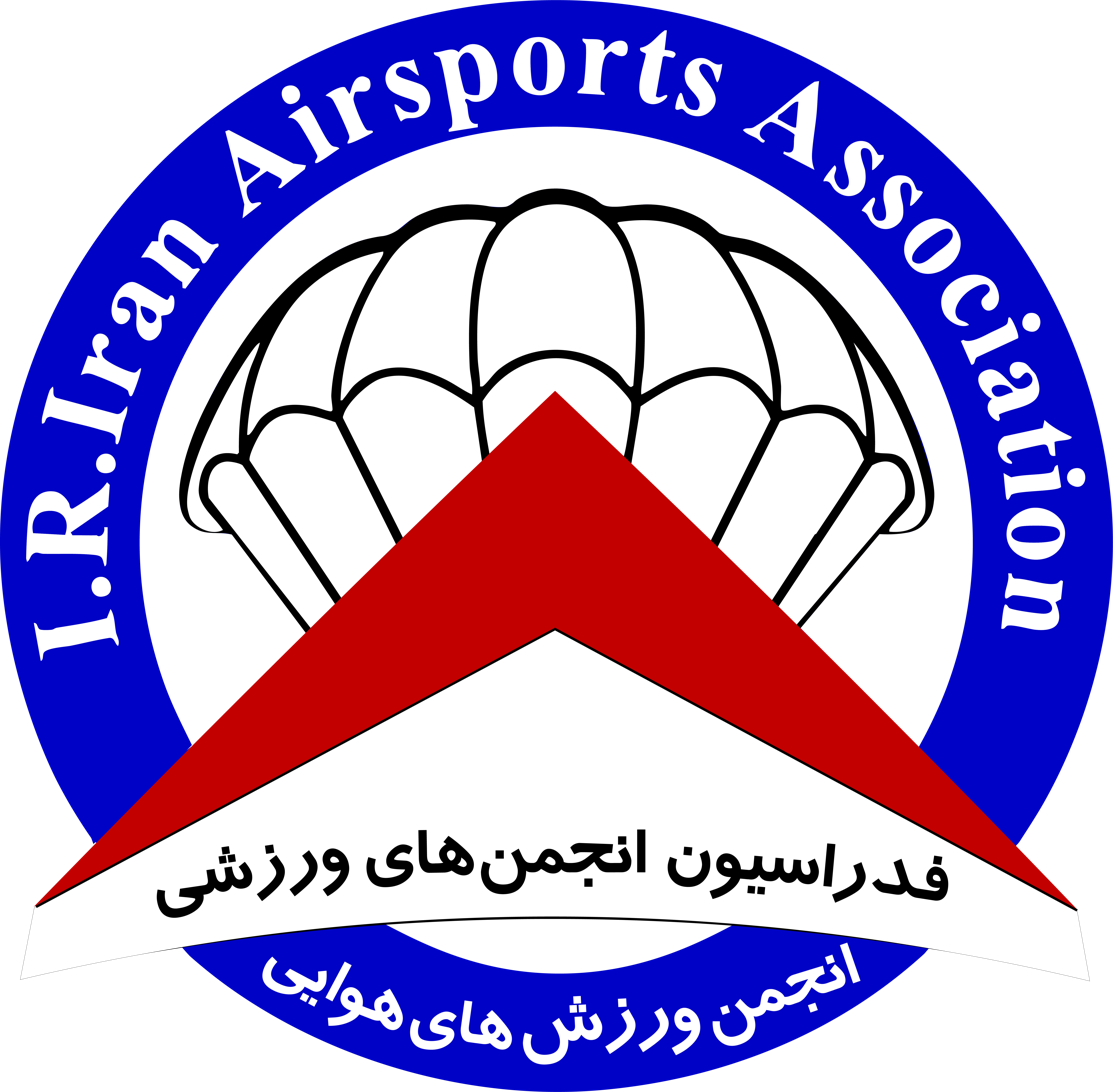
- Founded: 1374 SH (1995 CE), 31 years ago
- Location: Azadi Stadium, Tehran, Iran
- President: Benyamin Hosseini Mohegh
- Secretary-General: Seyed Safa Edin Hashemian
- Key people: Bijan Parsa, Ahmad Salimabadi, Abbas Nategh-Nouri, and others.
- Parent organization: Federation of Sports Associations
- Website: www.airsportsiran.ir

The Iran Air Sports Association is a sports and non-governmental organization that acts as the official, specialized, and technical authority for air sports in the country across all approved disciplines under its coverage, within the scope of its delegated authorities, and under the supervision of the Ministry of Sport and Youth and the Federation of Sports Associations, with the aim of developing, overseeing, and promoting air sports throughout the country.

== History ==
The Iran Air Sports Association was established in 1372 (1993) under the supervision of the then Physical Education Organization, operating in the field of skydiving (free fall). Then, in 1374 (1995), the Paragliding and Parachuting Committee was officially formed within the Mountaineering Federation, and in 1376 (1997), it was renamed the "Air Sports Association." In 1389 (2010), with the establishment of the "Federation of Sports Associations" under the Ministry of Sports and Youth, the Air Sports Association was separated from the Mountaineering Federation and transferred to this federation. Also, in 1377 (1998), this association was accepted as an official member with voting rights by obtaining a seat from the Fédération Aéronautique Internationale (FAI). To date, this organization has issued certificates for more than 10,000 athletes.

== Organizational Structure ==
The Iran Air Sports Association has the following organizational structure:

=== Specialized Committees ===
- Planning Committee
- Veterans Committee
- Education and Research Committee
- Technical Committee
- Public Relations Committee
- Economic and Marketing Committee
- Competitions and Talent Identification Committee
- Provincial Affairs Committee
- Referees Committee
- Coaches Committee
- Accident Investigation and Prevention Committee
- Research, Development, Manufacturing, and Repair of Flight Equipment Committee
- Armed Forces Committee

=== Provincial and Free Trade-Industrial Zone Committees ===
The Iran Air Sports Association currently has active committees in all 31 provinces of the country and in three Free Trade-Industrial Zones.

== Covered Disciplines ==
The Iran Air Sports Association is responsible for organizing and developing the following disciplines:

- Paragliding
- Paramotoring
- Aeromodelling
- Skydiving
- Hang gliding
- Powered hang gliding
- Jumping
- Hot air ballooning
- Parasailing
- Towing

== Provincial Committees and Free Trade-Industrial Zones ==
The Iran Air Sports Association currently has active committees in 31 provinces of the country and three free trade-industrial zones: Qeshm, Kish Island, and Maku, Iran.

== International Relations ==
The Iran Air Sports Association is an official member of the following entities:

- Fédération Aéronautique Internationale (FAI)
- Asian Air Sports Federation (AASF)

== See also ==
- Fédération Aéronautique Internationale
