= Rimlan-e Vosta =

Rimlan-e Vosta ريملان وسطي
- Village
- Location within Iran
- Coordinates: 25°23′52″N 61°27′58″E
- Country: Iran
- Province: Sistan and Baluchestan
- County: Chabahar
- Bakhsh: Dashtiari
- Rural District: Sand-e Mir Suiyan

Population (2006)
  - Total: 241
- Time zone: UTC+3:30 (IRST)
  - Summer (DST): UTC+4:30 (IRDT)

Rimlan-e Vosta (Persian: ريملان وسطي (زهرئ ), also Romanized as Rīmlān-e Vosţá; also known as Zahary, Jahlī Rīmdān, Rameh Dān, Remdān, Remīdān, Rīmdān, and Rīmdān-e Avval) is a village in Sand-e Mir Suiyan Rural District, Dashtiari District, Chabahar County, Sistan and Baluchestan Province, Iran. At the 2006 census, its population was 241, in 69 families.
