= Darts in Iran =

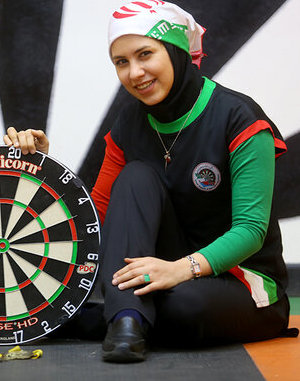
- Mozhgan Rahmani, Iranian darts player
- Country: Iran
- Governing body: Iranian Darts Association (IDA)
- National team: n/a
- First played: 2003; 23 years ago

Darts is a relatively new sport in Iran.

== History ==
Darts in Iran was founded in 2003 by the efforts of Masoud Zoohori and Mohammad Amin Azizpour through setting up the statutes of the sport and offering it to the Iranian sports authorities. Finally, darts in Iran started its activity as a formal association titled Iranian Darts Association (IDA) by the ratification of the Physical Education Organization of Iran (Ministry of Sport and Youth) under the supervision of the Archery Federation on September 21, 2004. Zoohori was appointed as the first president of IDA. In its early attempts, the Association prepared the statutes and regulations in order to hold darts training courses and competitions.

The first official darts competition in Iran was held with the coordination of the Pass Club in Tehran. The match was welcomed greatly. More than 20 correspondents from different press of the country, watched and reported this event. Moreover, some parts of this competition was aired on Iranian TV, while a particular report was prepared and broadcast by Iranian Sports Radio (Radio Varzesh). After carrying out the first Iranian darts tournament and its coverage by the media, people's interest to this sport surged and the number of applications for conducting dart training courses increased.

=== WDF Membership ===
Zoohori (IDA President) and Azizpour (IDA Secretary) applied to join the World Darts Federation (WDF). In 2004, WDF invited them to participate in the Federation's convention held in Perth, Australia in 2005, to defend and provide the reasons of applying for membership of the Iran Darts Association to the WDF. In this meeting, the representatives of IDA in response to the questions asked by the members and authorities of the WDF, presented a documentary report collected out of press reports, as well as, videos and photos of darts classes and competitions. In addition, they announced that at the moment nearly 500,000 people are either training or playing this sport in Iran. Finally, in voting for the acceptance of IDA in WDF, all the members from around 55 countries, voted in favor of acceptance and acclaimed IDA because of making darts more popular among all age groups, for about one minute.

=== First Participation in WDF Competitions ===
The WDF membership amplified incentives of the managers of IDA to make any endeavor both in the way of championship, and making darts a family sport. Returning from Australia, IDA representatives were welcomed by authorities, media and the desirous fans of this sport. In 2006, for the first time, the Iranian national darts team, led by Masoud Zoohori, participated in WDF Asia-Pacific Cup, held in Malaysia. In this competition, Sahar Zohouri won second place and awarded silver medal. This was the first official WDF medal won by Zohouri for Iranian darts. Meanwhile, in this competition, Zohouri successfully beat Australia's 2005 World Darts Championship third-place winner and knocked him out of the tournament.

=== International Olympiad for Children under Seven ===
IDA provided the infrastructures and platforms needed for standardized administration of the first darts tournament among children under seven in the world, using magnetic and safety darts.

At the beginning of the Olympiad, Zoohori announced the plan for discovering talented individuals in this field. He addressed Iranian and international sport authorities and optimistically stated that by supporting of early years age groups (children and adolescents), achievement to the heroic manner of sport, in order to make nations stay tighter and closer in friendship, would be possible. He, also, said that the optimum outcome of this diplomacy will be sustainable peace and tranquility for all the countries around the world.

The initiative of this tournament was suggested for the first time by Iran to the WDF. For this reason, a message was sent by Adolf Ogi, former President of Switzerland, and Special Adviser on Sport for Development and Peace to the United Nations Secretary-General, to the participants and authorities of the Olympiad. The message was read by Philippe Welti, Swiss Ambassador to Iran. Ogi in part of his message addressed the young participants in the competition in Iran and said: "I am sending this message to you from afar. I really wanted to be among you today. I hereby express my Congratulations to you. Your choice was to compete with each other concerning good sportsmanship, which is the first incentive to struggle and work hard. Courage, in comparison with other skills and powers, as well as, the energy is needed to win. Sport teaches us life lessons, which is necessary to acquire in order to live in a competitive but humanistic and peaceful society. Global development requires having a competitive spirit. In this way a person would be able to promote. The world needs peace and justice to let hopes and talents flourish. Sport can teach all of these points to us in general and children in particular. Today, you began competing against each other, and have little knowledge about life competitions. Anyhow, by trying to comply with regulations and play fairly versus your friends, you can bring prosperity to your life. "I wish good luck to all of you who, today, participated in this darts tournament."

More than 60 teams participated in the international darts tournament for children under seven. More than 50 journalists from different media networks from around the world covered and reported this event. Nearly 3,000 spectators and fans were in the competition setting.

=== Establishment of the West Asian Darts Union ===
In 2008, the IDA, held the first official meeting of the West Asian Darts Union with the permission of the WDF and Physical Education Organization of Iran.

On the sideline of this meeting which took place in the presence of Roy Price, WDF president, in Tehran, National Darts Competitions were held with the participation of wheelchair athletes. In addition, athletes who were unable to throw darts with their hands, were allowed to use air darts. This event was highly admired and appreciated by the WDF President. Following this, IDA proposed to set up Wheelchair Darts Committee in the WDF. Roy Price gave the responsibility of preparing the statutes and regulations for the formation of this committee, as well as hosting darts and wheelchair competitions to IDA. IDA also agreed to host the world's first wheelchair darts tournament under the supervision of the WDF.

=== 2007 Tournaments in Netherlands ===
The Iranian national darts team delegation and competitors in the 2007 WDF World Cup:

Name	Role
Masoud Zoohori	Leader of the Iranian national darts team
Sahar Zoohori	player
