= Islamic Republic of Iran Cricket Association =

- Sport: Cricket
- Founded: 2010
- Affiliation: International Cricket Council
- Affiliation date: 2003
- Regional affiliation: Asian Cricket Council
- Affiliation date: 2003
- President: Hossein Sadeq Abedin

Official website
- ifsafed.com/cricket
- (Iran)

Islamic Republic of Iran Cricket Association is the governing body for cricket in Iran. In 2017, it became an associate member of the International Cricket Council.

== Administration ==
=== Pre-2010 ===
Prior to 2010, cricket in Iran did not have its own independent governing body, it was administered together with baseball and softball.

In 2009 there were two chiefs of cricket in Iran.

President:

- Mahdi Maskani

General Secretary:

- Hamed Safari

== Development ==
ICC Development Officer:
