= Islamic Republic of Iran Baseball and Softball Association =

Governing body for baseball and softball in Iran

Former logo

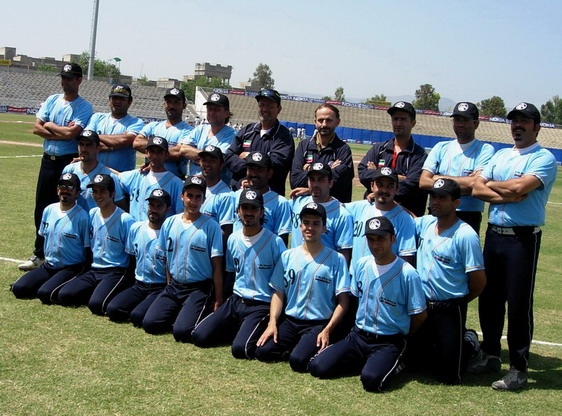
Iran National Team In Pakistan

The Baseball and Softball Association of the Islamic Republic of Iran (Persian: انجمن بیس بال و سافت بال جمهوری اسلامی ایران) is the governing body for baseball and softball in Iran. It was founded in 1993 as a baseball, softball, cricket and rugby union federation, but split from the rugby and cricket federation in 2010. It is a member of the World Baseball Softball Confederation.

== History ==
In 1993, the Iran Baseball Committee was founded as a part of a united federation with softball, cricket, and rugby. National baseball championships have been organized in the country since 1994. In 2010, the Baseball and Softball Association of the Islamic Republic of Iran was founded in 2010 after splitting off from the federation. In 2010, a baseball and softball-specific venue was constructed in Karaj.

The Iran national baseball team won the bronze medal in the 2012 West Asia Baseball Cup, their first medal in their three participations, having previously competed in 1999 and 2006. In February 2014, Alireza Adib replaced Hamid Reza Asemi as president of the association. As of 2014, Iran had only one baseball and softball-specific venue, while clubs in other cities frequently shared association football venues. In January 2016, World Baseball Softball Confederation (WBSC) President Riccardo Fraccari visited Tehran to meet with Iranian officials and outline the framework for baseball development in the country. In May 2016, the proposal was officially announced by the WBSC. The first phase was to foster support and instruction of the game, specifically via school programs and the establishment of new clubs, while long-term goals included the construction of new facilities.

By October 2020, the association was in charge of seven baseball teams and five softball teams. The total number of baseball players in Iran numbered around 250, while softball players stood at around 150. Association President Houman Mansourian announced that month that the association was interested in expanding Iran's participation in Baseball5 as a more cost-effective game compared to traditional baseball. A new stadium in Karaj was inaugurated in 2021.

The association is a member of the WBSC, the International Baseball Federation, the International Softball Federation, the Baseball Federation of Asia, and the Iran Federation of Sport Associations.

== See also ==
- Iran national baseball team
- Iran Baseball Championship
- Iran Federation of Sport Associations
