= Sahar Zohouri =

Iranian darts player

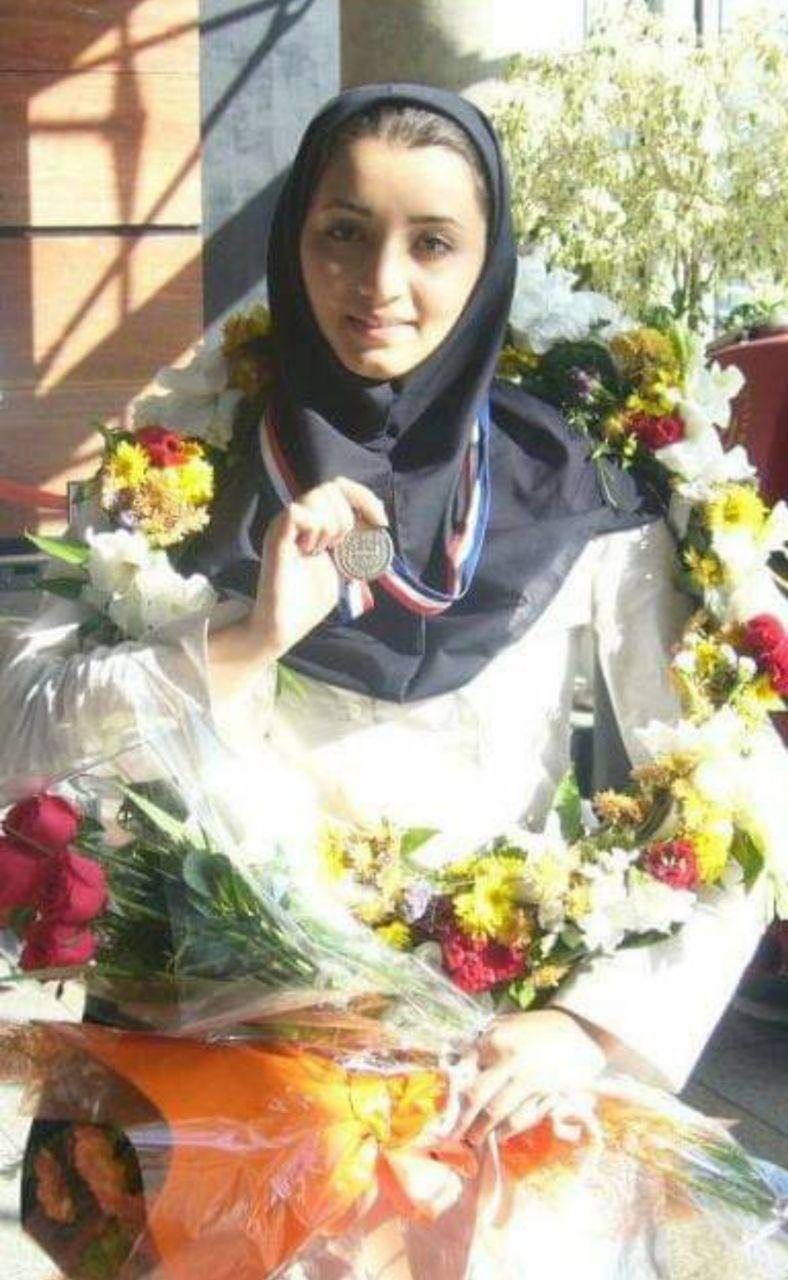

Personal information
- Born: 1986 (age 39–40)

Sport
- Sport: Darts
- Playing since: 2005
- Laterality: Right-handed

PDC premier events – best performances
- Premier League: Turkey Darts League

Other tournament wins
- Years
WDF Asia-Pacific Cup	2006
Iranian women darts championship	2008

Sahar Zohouri (born 1986) is an Iranian professional darts player. She is the first Iranian dart player ever to win a medal.

== Career ==
Sahar Zohouri won a silver medal at WDF Asia-Pacific Cup women's singles in Kuala Lumpur (2006). She ranked first at the Iranian women darts championship in 2008.
