= Borden (surname) =

Borden is a surname. Notable people with the surname include:

- Amanda Borden (born 1977), American gymnast
- Carl Borden (born 1977), American composer and record producer
- Charles Borden (1911–1968), American sailor and writer
- Charles Edward Borden (1905–1978), American-Canadian archaeologist
- David Borden (born 1938), American composer and keyboard player of minimalist music
- David Borden (politician), American politician from New Hampshire
- David M. Borden (1937–2016), American judge from Connecticut
- Delyone Borden (born 1985), Bermudan cricketer
- Eddie Borden (1888–1955), American film actor
- Edwin Howard Borden (1868–1953), Canadian pastor and academic
- Ellen Borden, married name Ellen Stevenson (1907–1972), American socialite and First Lady of Illinois
- Enid Borden, American charity founder and food insecurity activist
- Ethel Borden (1897–1953), American author, actress and heiress
- Eugene Borden (1897–1971), American character actor
- Frances Borden (born 1970), British artist
- Fred Borden, American ten-pin bowling coach
- Frederick William Borden (1847–1917), Canadian politician
- Gail Borden (1801–1874), American inventor of condensed milk and industrialist
- Gail Borden (figure skater) (1907–1991), American figure skater
- Harold Lothrop Borden (1876–1900), Canadian cavalry officer killed in the Second Boer War, son of Frederick Borden
- Harry Borden (born 1965), British portrait photographer
- Henry Borden (1901–1989), Canadian lawyer, businessman and public servant, nephew of Robert Borden
- Iain Borden (born 1962), English architectural historian
- James W. Borden (1810–1882), American judge and diplomat from Indiana
- Joe Borden (1854–1929), American baseball pitcher
- Jonathan Borden (born 1962), American neurosurgeon
- Katherine Borden, Canadian biochemist
- Laura Borden (1863–1940), wife of Canadian Prime Minister Robert Borden
- Lizzie Borden (1860–1927), American murder suspect and nursery rhyme character
- Lizzy Borden (actress), American pornographic actress and wrestler
- Lizzie Borden (director) (born 1950s), American filmmaker
- Lorris E. Borden (1877–1963), Canadian surgeon and political figure in British Columbia
- Lynn Borden (1937–2015), American actress
- Marilyn Borden (1932–2009), American actress and singer of the Borden Twins duo
- Mary Borden (1886–1968), American-British novelist
- M. C. D. Borden (Matthew Chaloner Durfee Borden, 1842–1912), American industrialist, son of Richard Borden
- Nate Borden (1932–1992), American football player
- Nathaniel B. Borden (1801–1865), American businessman and politician from Massachusetts
- Neil H. Borden (1895–1980), American advertising academic
- Nicholas Borden, British painter
- Olive Borden (1906–1947), American actress
- Richard Borden (1795–1874), American businessman and civic leader from Massachusetts
- Robert Borden (1854–1937), Prime Minister of Canada
- Robert Borden (TV producer), American television writer and producer
- Rosalyn Borden (1932–2003), American actor and singer of the Borden Twins duo
- Simeon Borden (1798–1856), American inventor, engineer and surveyor
- Steve Borden (born 1959), American professional wrestler known as Sting
- Vincent Borden (born 1999), American soccer player
- Walter Borden (born 1942), Canadian actor, poet and playwright
- Weston T. Borden (born 1943), American chemist
- William A. Borden (1853–1931), American librarian
- William Cline Borden (1858–1934), American surgeon
- William L. Borden (1920–1985), American congressional aide and figure in the Oppenheimer security case
- William Whiting Borden (1887–1913), American philanthropist
- Win Borden (1943–2014), American politician, lawyer and businessman from Minnesota

== See also ==
- Alfred Borden, fictional character in the book The Prestige
