= Borden =

Borden may refer to:

== Places ==
=== Australia ===
- Borden, Western Australia

=== Canada ===
- Borden, Saskatchewan
- Borden, Ontario, a Canadian Forces base located in Ontario
- Borden-Carleton, Prince Edward Island, formerly the town of Borden
- Borden Peninsula, Nunavut, Canada
- Borden Island, Nunavut, Canada
- Canadian Forces Base Borden (also known as "CFB Borden" and "16 Wing Borden"), a Canadian Forces base located in Ontario

=== United Kingdom ===
- Borden, Kent, England
- Bordon, Hampshire, England
  - Bordon Camp, British Army training camp and training area
- Borden, West Sussex, England

=== United States ===
- Borden, California
- Borden, Indiana
- Borden, Texas
- Borden County, Texas
- Borden Lake, a lake in Minnesota
- Borden Shaft, Maryland
- Borden Ranch AVA, California wine region

== People ==
- Borden (surname)
- Borden Chase (1900–1971), American writer
- Borden Smith (born 1943), Canadian professional hockey player

== Other uses ==
- Borden (company), a defunct American dairy company that was the forerunner of Borden, Inc.
- Borden Milk Products, a privately held dairy company
