= Charles Borden (disambiguation) =

Charles Borden (1911–1968) was an American sailor and writer.

Charles Borden may also refer to:

- Charles Edward Borden (1905–1978), American-Canadian professor of archaeology
- Charles Borden, character in The Invisible Man (2000 TV series)
- Charles Borden, character in Stealing Chanel played by John Rothman
- Charles 'Chuck' Borden, character in Gerald's Game (film)
