= Charles Hill-Tout =

British-Canadian ethnologist and folklorist

Charles Hill-Tout (1858–1944) was an ethnologist and folklorist, active in British Columbia, born in Buckland, Devon, England, on 28 September 1858.

In his early years, Hill-Tout studied divinity at a seminary in Lincoln and preached in Cardiff. He married Edith Mary Stothert and soon became fascinated with Darwinism. He participated in the Oxford Movement before his departure from England and landed in Toronto, Ontario, where he purchased a 100-acre farm near Port Credit on Lake Ontario. He was eventually offered a teaching position by his mentor, Daniel Wilson of Toronto University. Wilson told Hill-Tout about the indigenous Haida people and their totems, which aroused in him an insatiable curiosity. He set out for Vancouver, British Columbia, where he hoped to conduct ethnographic research on this people. While there, he was offered another teaching position, but was soon informed about the death of one of his children in England, which prompted him to leave the country to be with his family.

In 1891, Charles returned with his family to Vancouver and there became housemaster at Whetham College. For two years he was principal of Trinity College, and then opened Buckland College at Burrard and Robson street. He bought a quarter section of wooded land near Abbotsford and built a log cabin for a summer residence. In 1899 he bought a neighbour's farm and house and made it the family home.

In 1892, he commenced extensive excavations of the Great Marpole Midden in Vancouver for the Art, Historical, and Scientific Association of Vancouver, stimulating study of other middens in the region. The Great Midden, which dates from 2400 to 1600 years BP and was a living village until the first of the great smallpox epidemics in the late 17th century, is today a National Heritage Site of Canada.

In 1896 Hill-Tout interviewed Chief Mischelle of the Nlaka'pamux tribe. In 1899 the Folklore Society published his article "Sqaktktquaclt, or the Benign-Faced, the Oannes of the Ntlaka-pamuq", where he made reference to the myth of Oannes in the Persian Gulf. When the Jesup North Pacific Expedition stopped in Vancouver in 1897, Hill-Tout met Franz Boas, leader of the expedition. Hill-Tout escorted Harlan Smith of the expedition to Lytton for field study. By 1898, Hill-Tout had written his first book on the ethnology of the Haida people.

In 1903 the Royal Society of Canada published his study of totemism. In 1907 he published British North America: I. The far West, home of the Salish and Déné.

Hill-Tout was president of the British Columbia Academy of Science in 1914, and vice president the year before. During the First World War he enlisted in the Canadian Expeditionary Force with the 242nd Battalion, CEF. He died 30 June 1944, in Vancouver.

In 1978 Ralph Maud assembled four volumes of ethnographic writing by Hill-Tout: Thomson and the Okanagan, the Squamish and the Lillooet, the Mainland Halkomelem, the Sechelt and the South-Eastern Tribes of Vancouver Island.
