= Qijurittug =

Coordinates: 58°15′40.3″N 77°46′00.9″W

The Qijurittuq archaeological site (IbGk-3) is an archaeological site located on Drayton Island on the eastern shore of Hudson Bay, Nunavik, in Quebec, Canada. The site contains structural remains and artifacts relating to the Thule/Inuit culture dating back to approximately 700 to 800 years ago.

Research on the site has focused on the study of wood sources, procurement strategies, settlement patterns and examination of why semi-subterranean structures remained long after this type of housing was abandoned years before. The impact of climate change and continuous contact with Euro-Canadians and its effect on Inuit Culture is also examined.

== Introduction ==
Research from the Qijurittuq site began in 2007 as part of a study looking at the effect of climate change on the Thule/Inuit culture and the Paleo-Eskimos of the Hudson Bay area. The research was part of the Global International Polar Year project.

The Nunavik component of this global project was initially oriented towards the investigation of Thule/Inuit archaeology in Hudson Bay and Hudson Strait, within a context of climatic change. The Qijurittuq site research is directed at change in semi-subterranean dwellings and whether it was due to climate change, technology, and/or procurement strategies.

== Site excavation ==
The Qijurittuq site (IbGk-3) research is directed to four areas: palaeoenvironmental data with a focus on the Little Ice Age, archaeological information from Qijurittuq and other related sites, local people and their traditional knowledge and cultural history, and ethno-historical research focused on reasons of abandonment of semi-subterranean dwellings in the Eastern Arctic.

The Qijurittuq site is on Drayton Island, along the eastern shore of Hudson Bay in Nunavik, in Northern Quebec in the Hopewell archipelago. The site is located in a valley protected from the harsh winds during the fall and early winter. The landscape is characterized by continuous permafrost zone with strong winds blowing the fall and winter, shrub tundra with willow, birch, herbaceous plants, mosses and lichens. The islands are characterized by Cuesta formations of sandstone, quartzite and dolomite, with steep cliffs on one side and gentle slopes to seaward. Siltstone, found throughout the area, was utilized by the first Paleo-Eskimos to make tools.

The site has nineteen structures, of which thirteen are semi-subterranean houses, pointing to a fall and winter occupational period. Also included are structures indicating spring and summer occupation, typical of the Late Paleo-Eskimo time period.

Paleo-Eskimo structures were typically tents constructed of driftwood poles and covered with skins secured by a ring of rocks with stones creating a mid-passage that divided the living areas.

Three additional sites were near the Qijurittuq site, IbGk-7 thought to be spring and summer month occupations with evidence of tent rings, food cache, fox traps and graves. Site IbGk-7 was located near the water, down the valley with sites IbGk-8 and IbGk-38 located on top of the hill overlooking the valley to the north and south, exposed to the winds from every side.

=== Local Involvement ===
The excavations included local high school students from Inukjuak. The trainees were exposed basic archeology techniques like collecting artifacts, recording data, basic excavation, dendrochronology, as well as geomorphology.

Elders of the community shared their experiences traditional life in the area. Upon touring the site, the elders were amazed to discover how much wood was used by their ancestors in the construction of their houses. Traditional storytelling of ancestral life in the area, and recalling memories from childhood also aided in the research.

== Results and continuous evaluations ==
The Qijurittuq site was occupied by Paleo-Eskimo and Thule/Inuit who lived in the semi-subterranean houses. A total of 29,085 lithic tools and debris was collected along with 2,577 animal bones and teeth, 14 objects of worked bones and ivory, as well as 215 charcoal samples, 100 wood samples, 38 mineral/organic sediment samples and six metal pieces including one barbed point and two nails or rivets.

In addition 17 lithic raw material sources and 3 quarry sites were also sampled. Peat monoliths helped catalog the vegetation and climate history of the region. A decline of certain species occurred due to the onset of the Little Ice Age, which was characterized by cooler and drier conditions.

With ancestral knowledge being very important to research, local elders visited the site and described memories of past weather patterns, and recalled family stories of housing and stone tools that were used. They shared memories of the homes, such as entryways with an area for drying clothes, elevated beds, and the used of mattresses made from branches, grass, cloth, and caribou skin.

They expressed that while present summers are warmer and start earlier, the weather now is much less predictable than in the past, and there are types of insects and fauna that had not been seen before. Much colder conditions in the past, may have accompanied the end of the Little Ice Age around 1850 A.D. With wood being scarce in the tundra region, the elders were very curious of how so much wood came to be on the Qijurittuq site to construct these semi-subterranean homes. In studying the architecture of the houses, the research shows that they were typical houses that are similar across the Arctic.

Some elders believed that the wood was driftwood and some believed it to be from the tree line 100 m inland near the Boniface River. After radiocarbon dates were taken from various wood samples in the structures, it was determined that wood in the structures came from two different species. Cross-dating done with one sample showed a potential connection with a series from inland along the Boniface River suggesting the wood used in the roofs of the houses were from there as well as driftwood accumulating over some 400 years. The conditions to preserve the logs were poor, and research indicated that these dwellings were not re-occupied after 200 years.

== Abandonment ==
The most visible architectural structure in the Canadian Arctic is the semi-subterranean dwelling. Research of the three Thule/Inuit structures and middens showed that it was almost all associated with Palaeo-eskimo occupation. Studying the strata and ancient environment shows that the Thule/Inuit had occupied the vacant dwellings several hundred years after Paleo-Eskimo people chose to leave them behind. The large amount of work invested in Structure 1 led researchers to believe it was built with long-term occupation in mind by the Thule/Inuit.

Dwellings found in the Central and high Arctic, were normally composed of Bowhead whale bone. During the Thule migration however, wood was more abundant, allowing the construction of semi-subterranean housing made with wood. Research suggests that the Qijurittuq houses were the last ones built in Nunavik.

Some believe abandonment of semi-subterranean dwellings started at the beginning of the Little Ice Age and before the 16th century. In Labrador, these types of dwellings were believed to be used until the end of the 17th century when shared sod houses came into the picture. These sod houses varied in size and structure and were built out of necessity when snow was not abundant. This may have been due to warmer climate conditions. However, none have been found in the Nunavik area of Hudson Bay, and semi-subterranean homes were used until the 19th century.

Also important at this time, contact was being made with fur trappers from Europe, and eventually an establishment of trading posts and long-distance trading called for increased mobility to trap animals and the need for less permanent housing, thus not a lot of energy was put into building a long-term use home.
