= Bowling on Prime Network =

Bowling on Prime Network is the de facto name for ten-pin bowling events broadcast on the now defunct Prime Network. In particular, Prime Network televised tournaments from the Ladies Pro Bowlers Tour (now the Professional Women's Bowling Association) in 1993. The official name of the telecasts was The Bud Light LPBT Spring Tour. Leandra Reilly (play-by-play) and Leila Wagner (analysis) provided the commentary.

== Later history ==
On July 3, 1996, News Corporation and Liberty Media announced that the Prime Sports networks would be relaunched as part of the new Fox Sports Net group, with the eight Prime Sports owned-and-operated networks adopting brands that combined the "Fox Sports" name with the state or region served by the respective network. the Prime Sports-branded affiliates were officially relaunched as Fox Sports Net on November 1, 1996.

Bowling events continued to air on what would become Fox Sports Net. Michelle Feldman of the Professional Women's Bowling Association (PWBA) became the first female to score a 300 on American national television, when she accomplished the feat in a July 10, 1997 broadcast. Fred Borden and Jan Schmidt provided the commentary.

Fox Sports Net would broadcast bowling tournaments up until around 2000. Ron Thulin (play-by-play) and Randy Pedersen (analysis) were the commentators by this point.

== See also ==
- Professional Women's Bowling Association#In the media before 2015
- PBA on Fox
- PBA Tour#PBA Tour in the media
