= Dominion Land Company Site =

The Dominion Land Company Site (33FR12), also known as the Fort Reserve earthwork, was an Early Adena culture earthwork located in the Clintonville neighborhood in the city of Columbus, Ohio. It was excavated by archaeologists from the Ohio Historical Society shortly before being demolished by the Dominion Land Company in 1953 to make way for a housing development.

== Location ==
The earthwork site was located north of Glenmont Avenue, east of Overbrook Ravine, south of Adena Brook, and west of Yaronia Drive South. The site is now occupied by houses on Wynding Drive in the Fort Reserve subdivision.

== Site description ==
The earthwork consisted of two mounds within a circular embankment. The embankment in 1953 was approximately 400 feet in diameter, 17 feet wide, and several feet high. It was broken with an opening on the northwest and was accompanied by an interior ditch.

The mounds were described in the nineteenth century as being conically shaped and approximately 10 feet tall. By 1888, the site had been cultivated and the mounds were steadily reduced by plowing.

The first mound, located on the south wall of the embankment, had been partially damaged by construction company bulldozers shortly before the excavation began. No precise measurements of its diameter were taken and the remains were described at the time as being approximately one to two feet in height.

The second mound, 300 feet north of the first mound, was six feet high and 60 feet in diameter in 1953.

== Excavation ==
Before the earthwork site was demolished by the Dominion Land Company, archaeologists from the Ohio Historical Society and students from the Ohio State University excavated it from May to September 1953 under the supervision of Raymond S. Baby.

In the vicinity of the first mound, the excavators found two hafted scrapers, a grooved axe fragment, a projectile point, and two potsherds. Portions of the interior ditch near the mounds contained a large quantity of pottery fragments, including one almost complete vessel and six partial vessels.

Excavation of the floor of the second mound revealed the intact stone-slab burial of a six-to-eight-year-old child surrounded by a circular pattern of 48 post molds as well as 12 additional post molds inside the pattern.

Radiocarbon dating tests on three samples of charred hickory nut remains found at the site produced a mean age of 2402 BP, indicating that the site was occupied during the Early Adena period.

A restored ceramic vessel, as well as portions of a rim, the base, and a lug handle from another vessel found on the site, are on display at the museum of the Fort Ancient National Historic Landmark. Another vessel fragment is on display at the Ohio Historical Center.
