= Grand River (Ontario) =

Coordinates: 42°51′19″N 79°34′40″W

- Grand River meandering north of West Montrose

Location
- Country: Canada
- Province: Ontario

Physical characteristics
- Source
  - location: Near Dundalk, Ontario
  - elevation: 525 m (1,722 ft)
- Mouth
  - location: Lake Erie at Port Maitland
  - elevation: 174 m (571 ft)
- Length: 280 km (170 mi)

The Grand River, formerly known as the River Ouse, is a large river in Ontario, Canada. It lies along the western fringe of the Greater Golden Horseshoe region of Ontario which overlaps the eastern portion of southwestern Ontario, sometimes referred to as Midwestern Ontario, along the length of this river. From its source near Wareham, Ontario, it flows south through Grand Valley, Fergus, Elora, Waterloo, Kitchener, Cambridge, Paris, Brantford, Ohsweken, Six Nations of the Grand River, Caledonia, and Cayuga before emptying into the north shore of Lake Erie south of Dunnville at Port Maitland. One of the scenic features of the river is the falls and Gorge at Elora.

The Grand River is the largest river that is entirely within southern Ontario's boundaries. The river owes its size to the unusual fact that its source is relatively close to the Georgian Bay of Lake Huron, yet it flows southwards to Lake Erie, rather than westward to the closer Lake Huron or northward to Georgian Bay (most southern Ontario rivers flow into the nearest Great Lake, which is why most of them are small), thus giving it more distance to take in more water from tributaries.

The river's mostly rural character (even when flowing through the edges of Waterloo and Kitchener), ease of access and lack of portages make it a desirable canoeing location, especially the stretch between West Montrose and Paris. A number of conservation areas have been established along the river, and are managed by the Grand River Conservation Authority.

The Grand Valley Trail stretches 275 km (171 mi) along the river's valley between the town of Dundalk and Lake Erie.

In 1669 the indigenous name Tinaouatoua was recorded by Galinée. A 1945 book about the Grand River recorded the spelling Tinaatoua and attributed it to the Seneca, though its sources are unclear.

The Mohawk name for the Grand River, O:se Kenhionhata:tie means "Willow River", for the many willows in the watershed, while the Onondaga call it Gęyǫhowanę́hneh, the "Great River". During the 18th century, the French colonists named it Grande-Rivière. It was later renamed as Ouse River by John Graves Simcoe for the River Great Ouse near his childhood home in Lincolnshire on the east coast of England. The anglicized form of the French name has remained in common use.

The Ojibwe name for the Grand River is Owaashtanong-ziibi. A. Jones, the General Surveyor of Upper Canada, reported the name of the river among the Mississaugas to be O-es-shin-ne-gun-ing, which he glossed as "the one that washes the timber down and carries away the grass and the weeds".

== Watershed ==
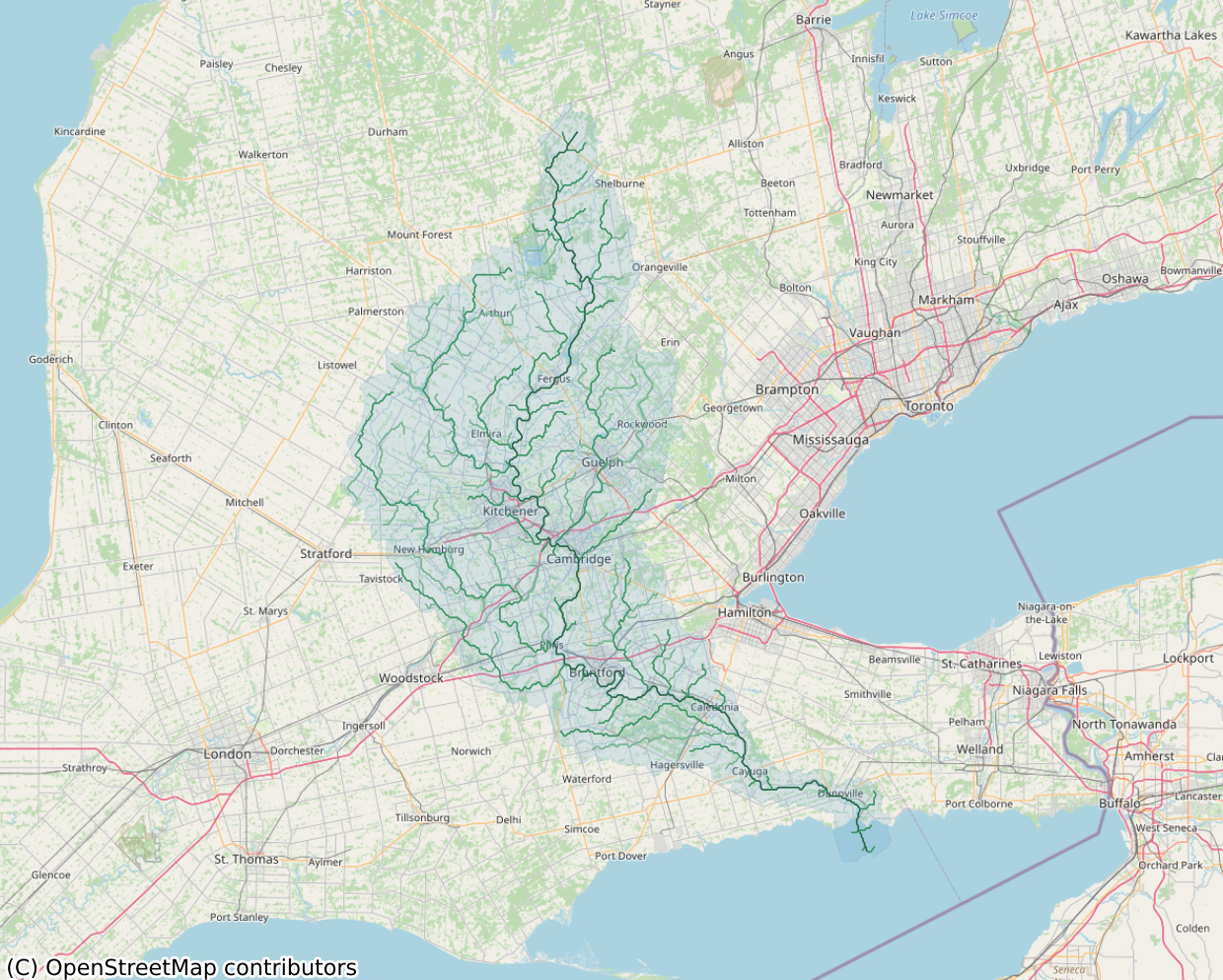
Watershed of the Grand River

The Grand River watershed consists of all the land that drains into the Grand River through tributary creeks and rivers such as the Conestogo, Speed, Eramosa, Irvine and Nith rivers. The Grand River has Southern Ontario's largest watershed.

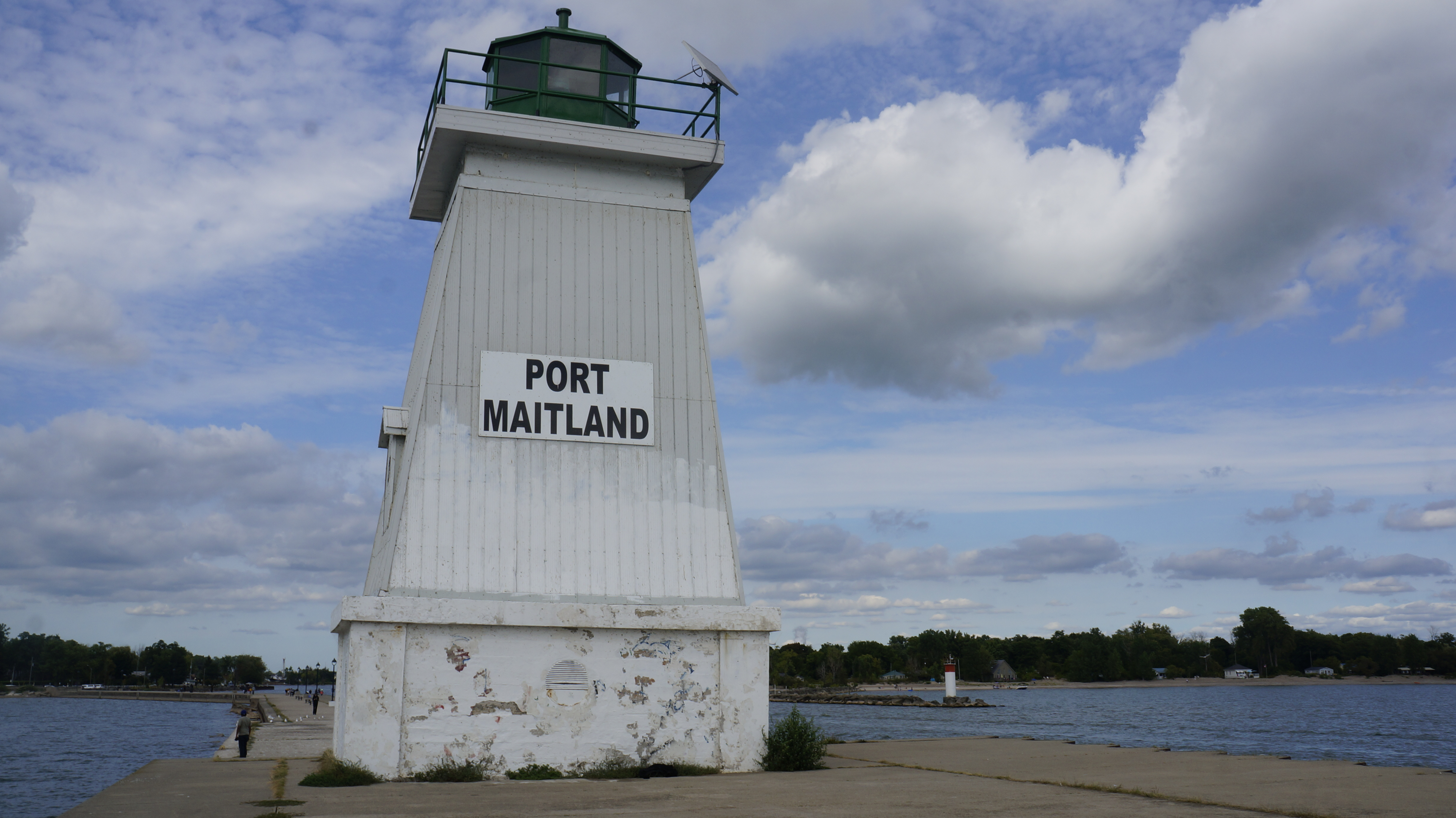
Grand River at Port Maitland

Because the watershed is an ecosystem with natural borders, it includes and crosses many municipal boundaries and can be considered a transitional area between Southwestern Ontario and the Golden Horseshoe region that surrounds the west end of Lake Ontario. Its headwaters are near Dundalk in the north. The Grand River flows south-south-east.

Luther Marsh, a 52-square-kilometre (20 sq mi) wetland on the upper Grand, is one of the largest inland wetlands in southern Ontario and provides habitat for waterfowl, including least bittern and black tern, and amphibians. It is also an important staging area during bird migrations. The importance of the watershed (7,000 square kilometres (2,700 sq mi)) has been recognized by the designation of the Grand as a Canadian Heritage River.

The Grand Valley Dam, located near the village of Belwood, helps to control the flow of water, especially during periods of spring flooding. The dam, completed in 1942, is commonly referred to as Shand Dam, named for a local family who were displaced by filling of the dam's reservoir, Lake Belwood.

=== Lakes, creeks and rivers ===
With a watershed area of 7,000 square kilometres (2,700 sq mi), the Grand River flows from Dundalk to Lake Erie with numerous tributaries flowing into it:

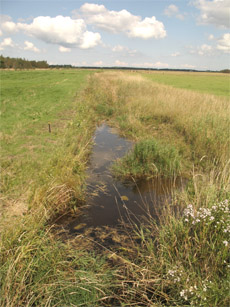
Grand River from County Road 2 near Dundalk

- Canagagigue Creek
- Chilligo Creek
- Conestogo River
- Eramosa River
- Fairchild Creek
- Idlewood Creek
- Irvine Creek
- Knob Creek
- Laurel Creek
- McKenzie Creek
- Mill Creek
- Moffat Creek
- Nith River
- Schneider Creek
- Speed River
- Spencer Creek
- Whitemans Creek

The Conestogo River joins the Grand at the village of Conestogo just north of Waterloo. The Eramosa River joins the Speed River in Guelph. The Speed River joins the Grand in Cambridge. The Nith River joins the Grand in Paris.

=== Pre-Laurentide hydrology ===
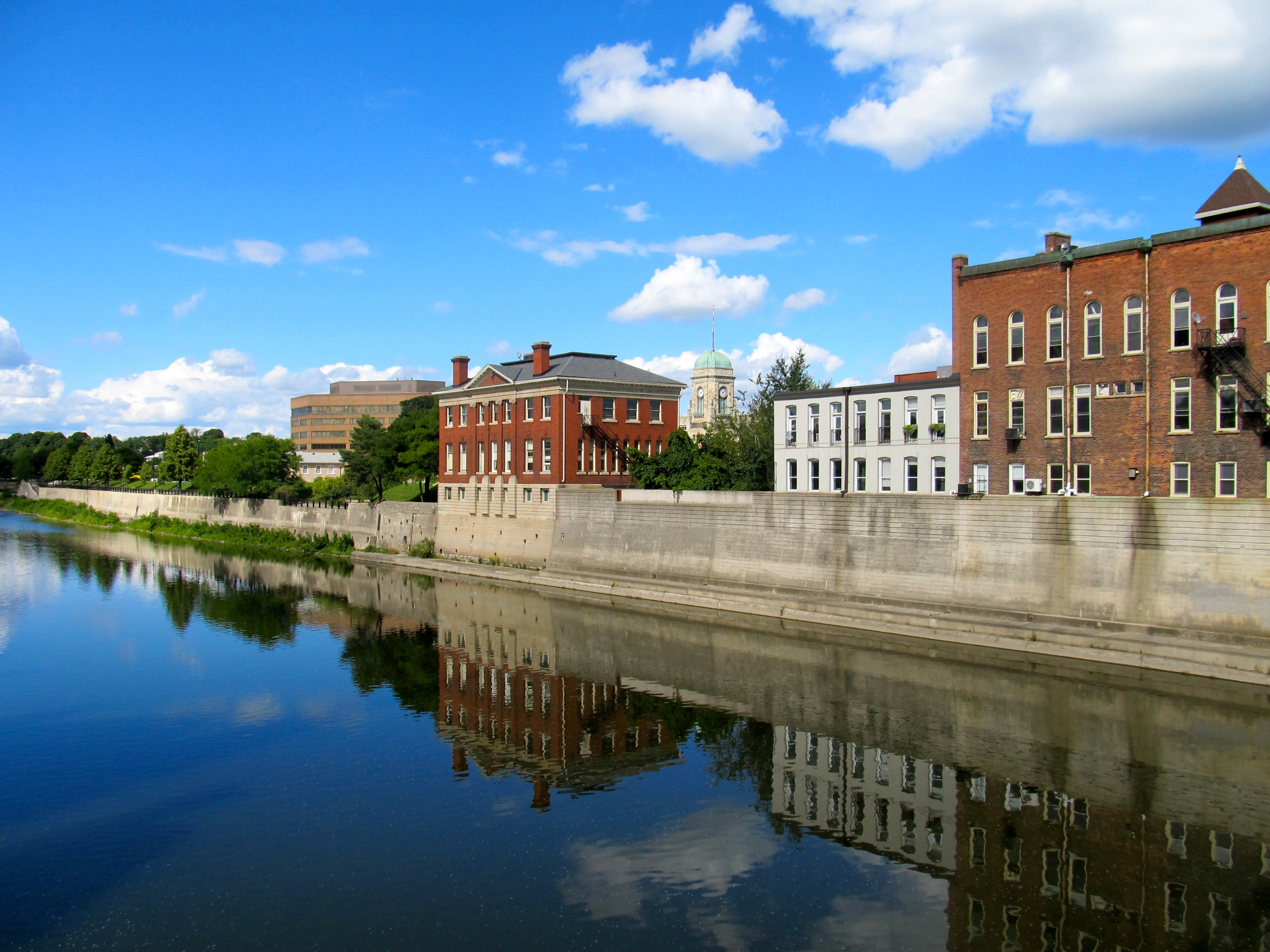
Grand River in Cambridge

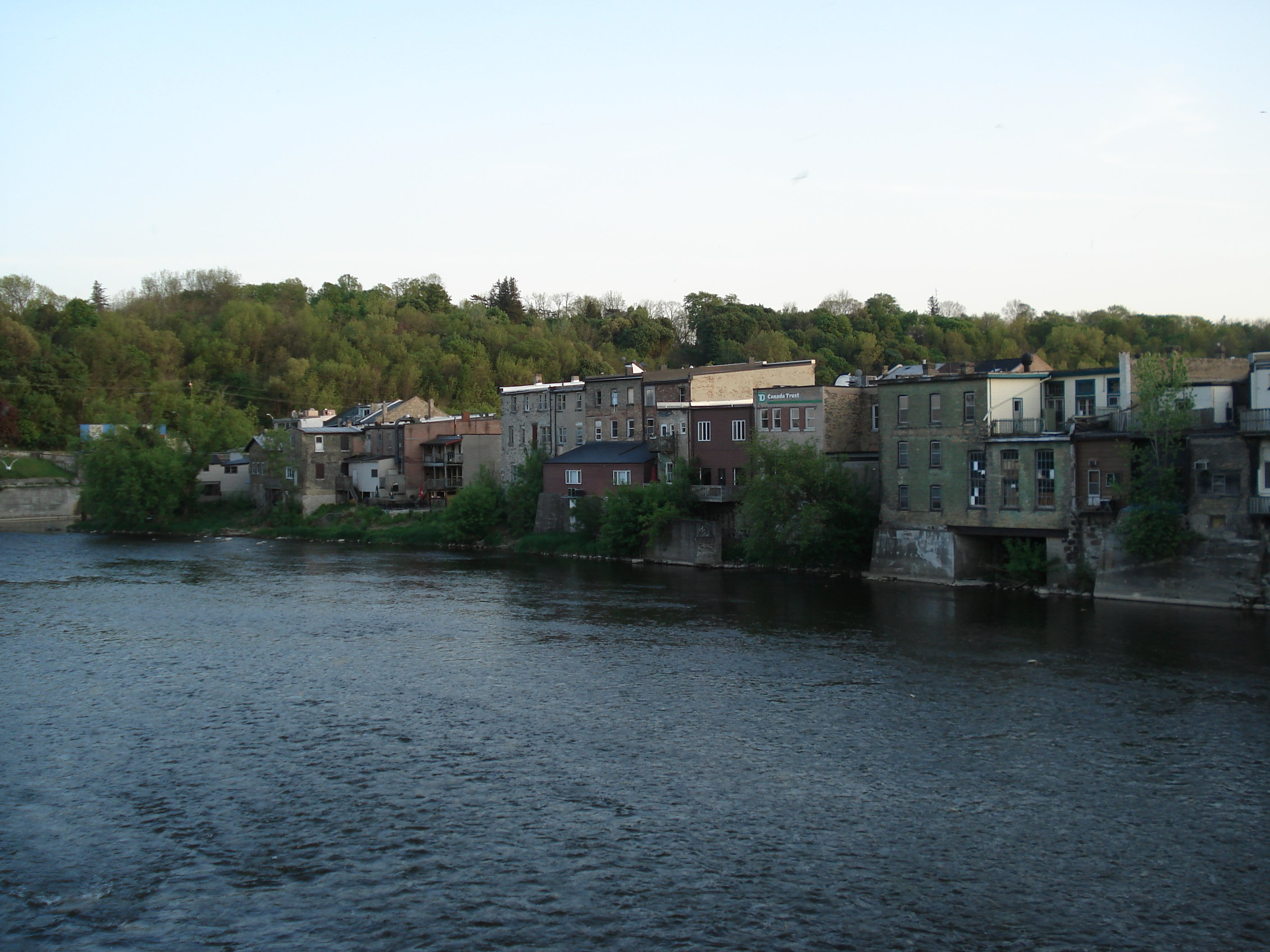
Grand River in Paris

Prior to the most recent glaciation—the Laurentide—an earlier river flowed through a gorge roughly parallel to the current Grand River. Evidence of the "buried gorge" of the previous river has been found when wells have been drilled. Rather than finding water-bearing bedrock at a depth of a dozen metres or less, the path of the buried gorge can be found with overburden of dozens of metres.

== History ==
=== Prehistory ===
==== Archaic period ====
The Laphroaig site (AgHa-54) on the lower Grand River shows evidence of occupation in the latter part of the Early Archaic period.

During the Late Archaic period (c. 4500 RCYBP to c. 2800 RCYBP), water levels in Lake Erie and Lake Ontario were higher due to drainage reasons as the land continued to deglaciate. The people of the Late Archaic were mobile hunter-gatherers who had not yet developed ceramics. While Late Archaic people in what is now southern Ontario used a variety of projectile point types, one distinct type, the Innes point, was associated with the Grand River drainage basin and took its name from a type site a few kilometres west of Brantford, which sits on the lower Grand River. Due to high water levels at the start of the Late Archaic, sites which are today located inland up the river may once have been true shoreline sites, similarly to the phenomenon of site stratification observed on Lake Huron. This phenomenon is also observable in reference to Lake Erie. For example, the Canada Century site (located on the Welland River) lies 17 kilometres (11 mi) north of the Lake Erie shore, but may once have been significantly closer.

Due to the absence of ceramics, it is difficult to date Archaic sites. It is generally believed that sites were occupied seasonally, though there are notable exceptions to this. The archaeologist Chris Ellis argues that in the 1950s and 1960s, there was a tendency for archaeologists in eastern North America to identify sedentarization with progress on a conceptual level. Some sites may have had a number of distinct occupations, occurring in different seasons and for different purposes. Nevertheless, there is a broad grouping of sites into warm-weather, lowland sites characterized by ground stone tools and fishing equipment, or cold-weather, upland sites with abundant scrapers and projectile points, possibly indicating fall and winter deer hunting activities. Evidence of Late Archaic fishing activities in Ontario is concentrated at lakeshore sites located at river mouths; no known site of this type, however, has been located on the Grand River. No evidence of fish at upland sites has been found, suggesting a pattern of seasonal upland hunting and lowland fishing. Tincombe points out, however, that fishing may still have occurred on the upper Grand River, notwithstanding a lack of surviving remains at sites. He further proposes areas around Caledonia and Brantford as persistent places of occupation in the Late Archaic, due to a high concentration of consecutively dated sites from that period. One especially significant site, the Johnson Flats site (Borden AgGx-214), is located on a former bar in the Grand River near Caledonia. Discovered in 1994, the site contains materials dating to the Early, Middle, and Late Archaic periods, as well as the later Princess Point complex.

==== Woodland period ====
The people of the Princess Point complex (c. 500 CE – 1000 CE) are strongly associated with the Grand River by archaeologists. Princess Point sites cluster heavily along the river's length, where the focus and concentration of Princess Point people shifted from their earlier territory around Princess Point near Hamilton. Princess Point people were attracted to the fertile Grand River floodplains, in common with other peoples engaging in maize horticulture around the same time. Floodplains provided rich soils for cultivation, as well as easy access to riverine resources. Indeed, early evidence of lake sturgeon fishing on the Grand River has been discovered at the Cayuga Bridge site, which is also associated with the Princess Point complex and dated to AD 700–900. Thousands of fish remains were also unearthed at the Porteous and Holmedale sites near Brantford, which date to around AD 1000.

=== Protohistoric period ===
By the 16th and 17th centuries, the Grand River valley was inhabited by the Neutral people. This was a name given to them by European settlers, as they refused to side with either the Haudenosaunee or the Petun tribes during their conflicts in the area. An Iroquoian people, they had close trade and cultural relations with other Ontario Iroquoian societies such as the Huron and Petun.

The Wendat, another distinct Iroquoian-speaking nation, who resided northeast of the Grand River valley, had long competed to remain independent of their enemy the Haudenosaunee Confederacy, a powerful alliance of five nations based around the Great Lakes in the present central and western New York state area. Caught in between, the Neutrals paid dearly for their refusal to ally. Historical accounts differ on exactly how the Neutral tribe was wiped out. The consensus is that the Seneca and the Mohawk nations of the Haudenosaunee destroyed the smaller Neutral tribe in the 17th century, in the course of attacking and severely crippling the Wendat (Huron). The Haudenosaunee were seeking to dominate the lucrative fur trade with the Europeans. It was during this warfare that the Haudenosaunee attacked the Jesuit outpost of Sainte-Marie among the Hurons. The Jesuits abandoned the mission after many Wendat and numerous priests were killed here.

To survive, remnants of The Neutral tribe migrated in 1667 to La Prairie (Caughnawaga or Kahnawake), a Catholic mission settlement just south of Montreal that was occupied primarily by converted Mohawk who had migrated north from New York. In 1674 identifiable groups of Neutrals were recorded among its population. It can be presumed that many of their descendants are still living there today. In later wars between Britain and France, the Caughnawaga people, many of whom had converted to Catholicism, were allies of the French. The Haudenosaunee League in New York then was neutral or sided with the British. Because different nations were on different sides in this war, it was difficult for the Haudenosaunee nations to adhere to the Great Law of Peace and avoid killing each other. They managed to avoid such bloodshed until the American Revolution (1775–83).

Other descendants of the Neutrals may have joined the Mingo, a loose confederacy of peoples who moved west in the 1720s, fleeing lands invaded by Haudenosaunee, and settled in present-day Ohio. The Mingo were among tribes who later fought the Americans in the Northwest Indian Wars for the Ohio Valley (1774–95). During the 1840s, they were among the tribes removed to Oklahoma and Indian Territory west of the Mississippi River. Neutral descendants are among the people now known as the Seneca in Oklahoma.

After the desolation of the Neutral tribe, the Haudenosaunee Confederacy used the Grand River Valley as a hunting ground and trapping territory. Though the Six Nations (by then including the Tuscarora) held the territory by right of conquest, they did not settle it, apart from a limited presence on the northern and western shores of Lake Ontario.

When the French explorers and Coureurs de bois came to the region in search of fur and other items of value to Europeans, the Grand River Valley was among the last areas of southern Ontario to be explored. Since the French worked closely with their Native allies in the acquisition of fur and trading of European goods for it, they went only where the natives resided. Even after the English conquered New France in 1760 during the Seven Years' War, the Grand River Valley remained largely unoccupied and largely uncharted.

An explorers' map in 1669 showed the River as being called the Tinaatuoa or Riviere Rapide. A 1775 map shows it as Urse, a name which also appeared on a 1708 map and on Bellin’s Carte des Lacs of 1744. The d’Anville map of 1755 shows the river Tinaatuoa but adds the words Grande River at its mouth. Other 18th Century names were Oswego and Swaogeh. In 1792, Simcoe tried to change the name of Grande Riviere to Ouse, after a river in England and the Thomas Ridout map of 1821 shows "Grand R or Ouse". Simcoe failed because the name Grand River had been in common usage for some time by then.

=== Six Nations of the Grand River ===
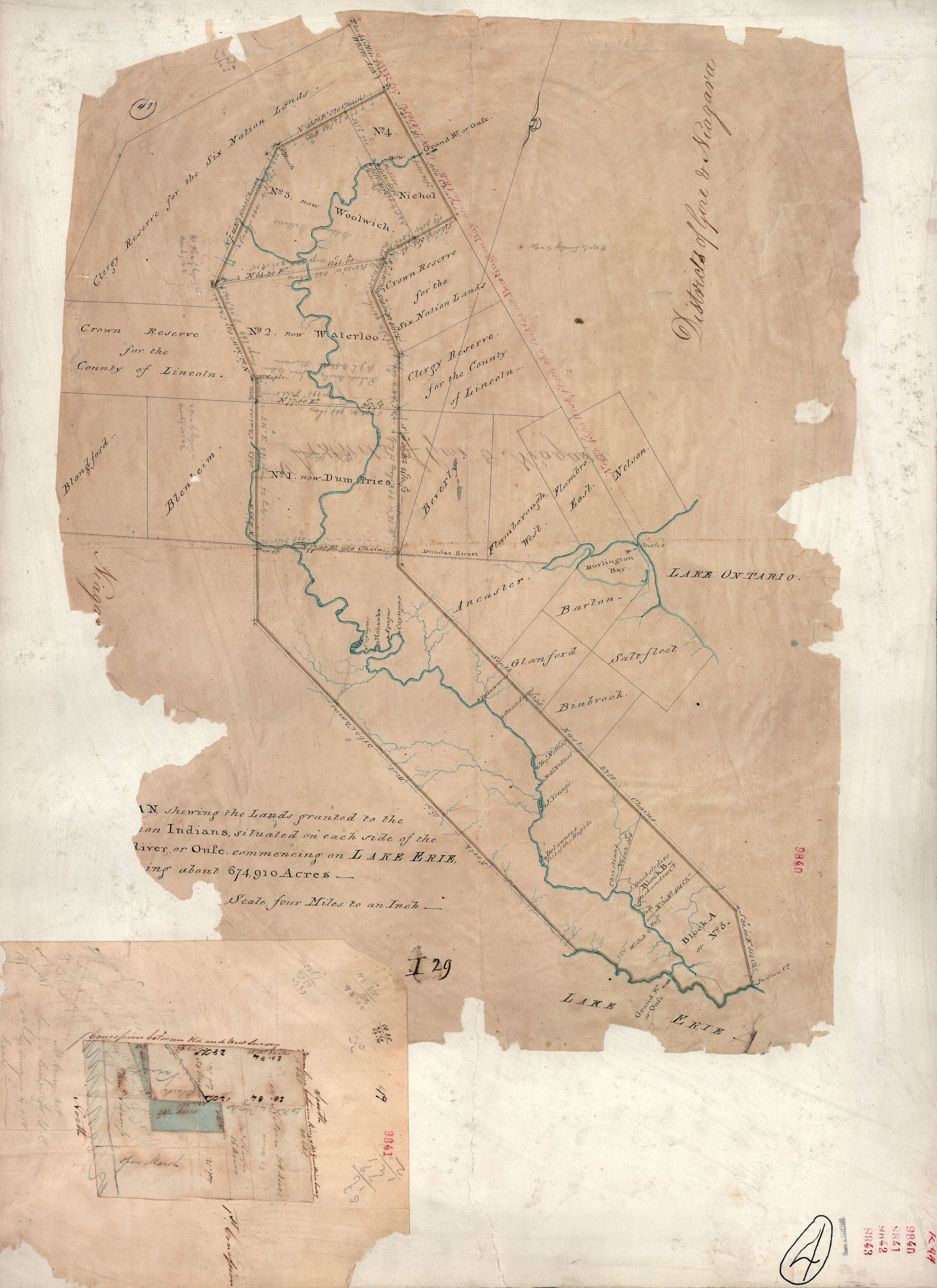
Thomas Ridout map of Grand River Indian Lands, 1821

Apart from large numbers of Tuscarora and Oneida, who mainly allied with the American colonists, the other four nations of the Haudenosaunee Confederacy sided with the British during the American War of Independence. Warfare throughout the frontier of the Mohawk Valley had resulted in massacres and atrocities on both sides, aggravating anti-Haudenosaunee feelings among the colonists. Without consultation or giving the Haudenosaunee a place in negotiations, the British ceded their land in New York to the new United States.

The Haudenosaunee were unwelcome in the newly created nation. After the war, Six Nations leader Joseph Brant appealed to the British Crown for help, as they had promised aid for allies. In gratitude for their assistance during the war, the Crown awarded the Haudenosaunee land in Upper Canada. Brant led Mohawk from the Upper Castle and families of the other Six Nations to Upper Canada. They first settled at what is present-day Brantford, where Brant crossed, or ‘forded’ the Grand River. It was also called Brant's Town. Not all members of the Six Nations moved north. Remnants of the past confederacy live today throughout New York state, some on federally recognized reservations. In 1784 the British Crown awarded to the Six Nations the "Haldimand Tract", a tract of land "six miles deep from each side of the river beginning at Lake Erie and extending in that proportion to the [source] of the said river." Much of this land was later sold or otherwise lost to the Six Nations.

A portion of this tract near Caledonia, Ontario, is the basis for the 2006 Caledonia land dispute, in which the Six Nations filed a land claim with the government. The Six Nations reserve south of Brantford, Ontario, is what remains of the Haldimand Tract. Throughout the 19th century, many Anglo-Canadian settlements developed along the Grand within former Six Nations territory, including Waterloo, Berlin (now Kitchener), Cambridge, Paris, Brantford, Caledonia, Dunnville and Port Maitland.

After the American War of Independence, the Crown purchased land from the Mississaugas in Upper Canada to award as grants to Loyalist refugees as compensation for their property losses in the colonies. Loyalists from New York, New England and the South were settled in this area, as the Crown hoped they would create new towns and farms on the frontier. In the 19th century, many new immigrants came to Upper Canada from England, Scotland, Ireland and Germany seeking opportunity. Settlements were popping up all over Southern Ontario, and many colonists coveted the prize Grand River Valley.

The 1846 Gazetteer relates the history of the First Nations of the area as follows:

"In 1784, Sir F. Haldimand ... granted to the Six Nations and their heirs for ever, a tract of land on the Ouse, or Grand River, six miles in depth on each side of the river, beginning at Lake Erie, and extending to the head of the river. This grant was confirmed, and its conditions defined, by a patent under the Great Seal, issued by Lieutenant Governor Simcoe, and bearing date January 14, 1793 ... The original extent of the tract was 694,910 acres, but the greater part of this has been since surrendered to the Crown, in trust, to be sold for the benefit of these tribes. And some smaller portions have been either granted in fee simple to purchasers with the assent of the Indians, or have been alienated by the chiefs upon leases; which, although legally invalid, the government did not at the time consider it equitable or expedient to cancel."

== See also ==
- List of rivers of Ontario
- Waterloo Moraine
