= Ken Yokobosky =

Ten pin bowling coach and player

Ken Yokobosky is a ten-pin bowling coach and player and has produced and featured in numerous bowling training DVDs such as the 2006 Bowling Fun and Fundamentals for Boys and Girls, Essential Keys To Better Bowling and Advanced Bowling Techniques, Tips And Tactics, working alongside Fred Borden. He was the assistant coach for Team USA for ten years.

In 2006, he competed on an episode of Chain Reaction.
