= Mill Creek, Puslinch =

Stream in Ontario, Canada

Coordinates: 43°21′22.6″N 80°18′56.9″W

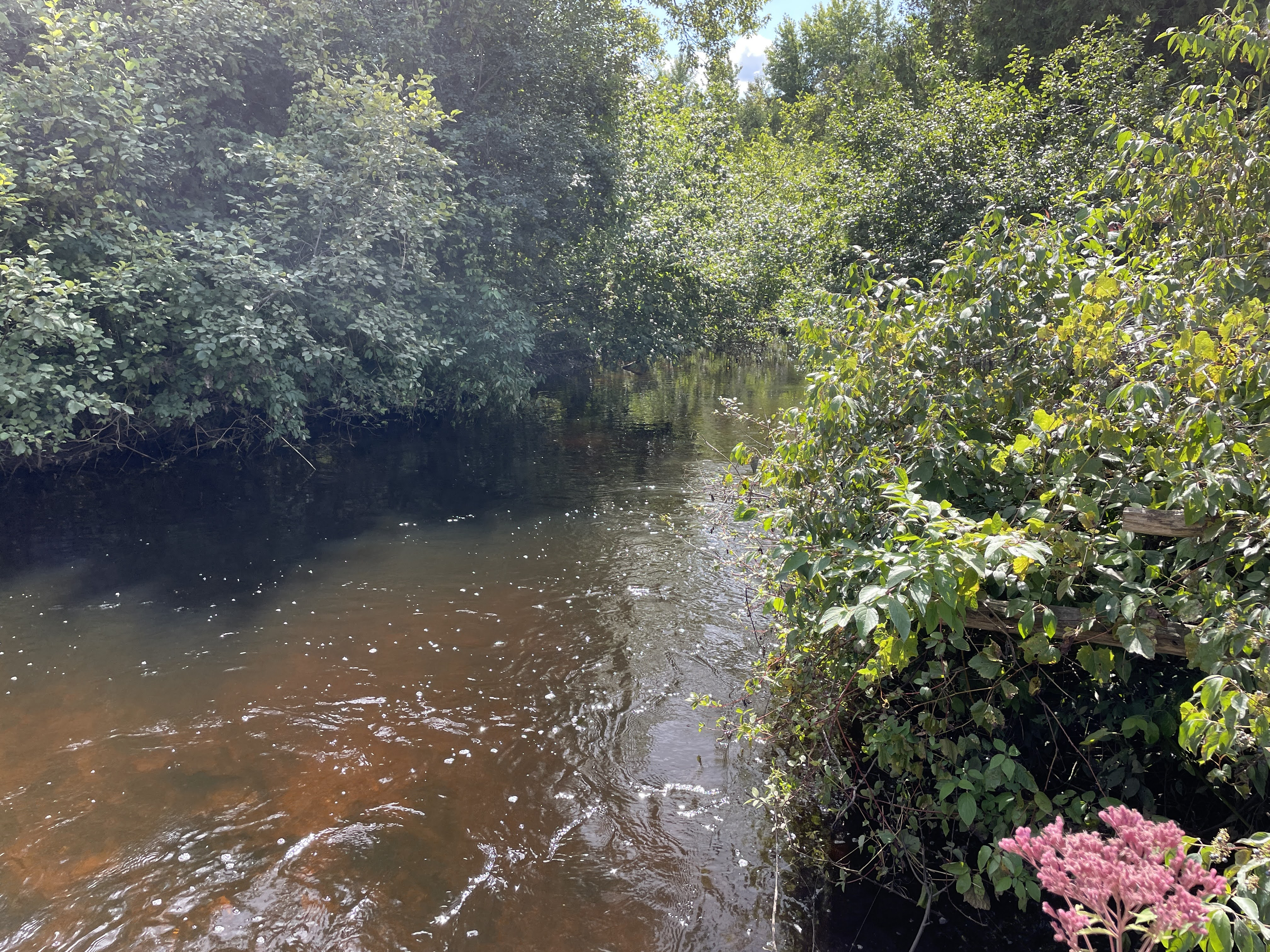
Mill Creek, Side Road 10 Gauge Station

Mill Creek is a groundwater-fed stream located in the Township of Puslinch, in southwestern Ontario. Mill Creek is part of the Grand River watershed.

The Friends of Mill Creek (FoMC) community group organizes ecological restoration activities on Mill Creek, including a youth stewardship rangers program.

== Geographical location ==
Mill Creek is located in the centre of the Grand River Watershed in south-central Ontario. Extending into the City of Cambridge and Township of North Dumfries, the City of Guelph, the Township of Puslinch, and the Town of Milton, the subwatershed drains around 104 square kilometres of land. The headwaters begin in Puslinch Township and travel southwest through Aberfoyle, then through Class I wetlands just south of Highway 401. After reaching the Shade's Mills Reservoir and Dam, Mill Creek outlets into the Grand River in downtown Cambridge near the Grand River Pedestrian Bridge.

A map of the Mill Creek subwatershed is available on the Friends of Mill Creek website.

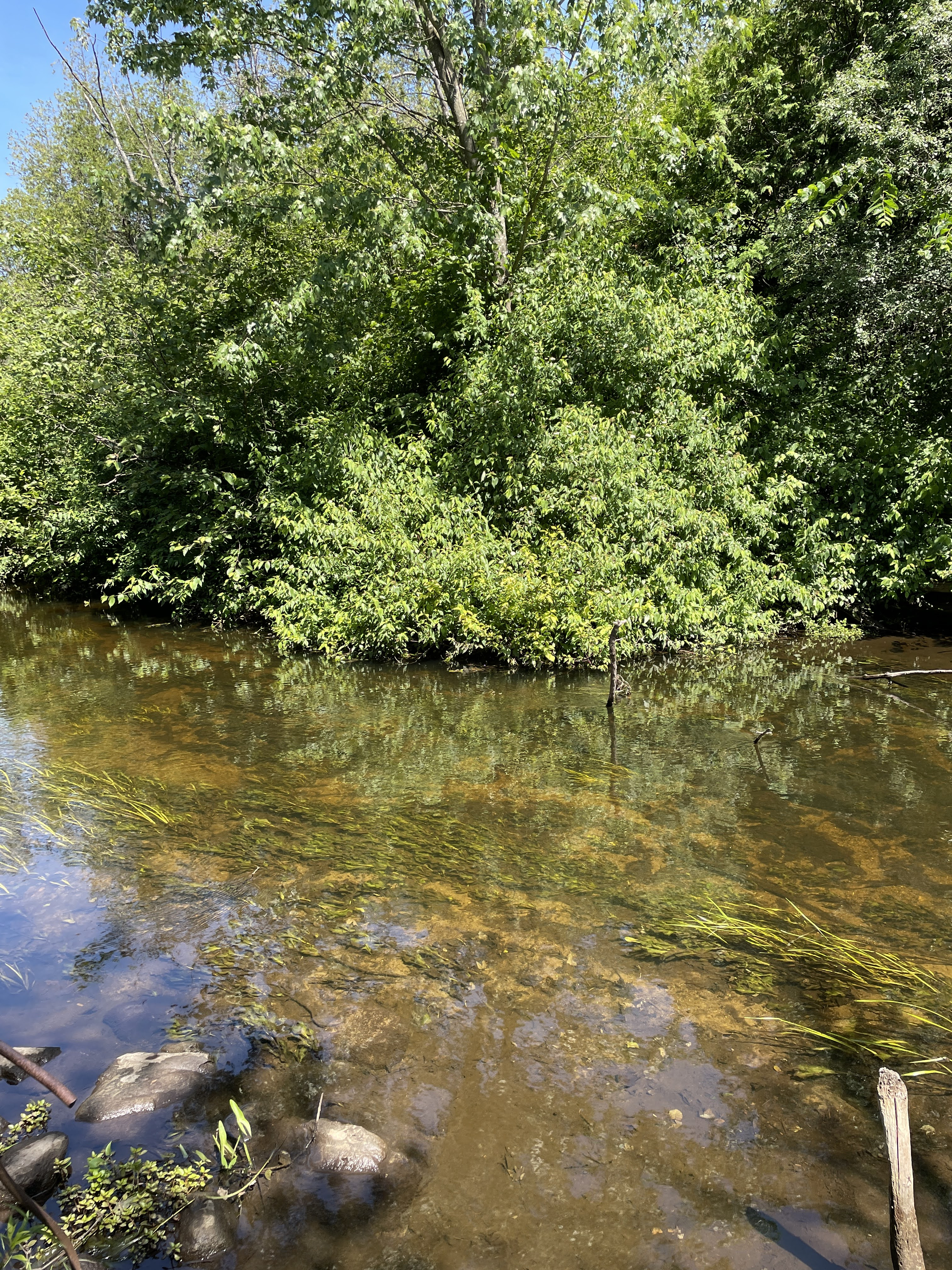
Mill Creek, Bond Tract

== History ==
The Grand River Conservation Authority (GRCA) declared Mill Creek as, "one of the most significant examples of stream improvement work in the province" in 1991.

The integrity and ecological status of Mill Creek has historically faced many threats. Historical threats to the creek include sediment loading and channelization due to the development of Highway 401 and the Hanlon Expressway interchange; as well as unrestricted cattle access to the creek which exacerbated bank destruction. Currently, further development in the area may damage the creek.

Efforts for stream restoration at Mill Creek have historically been motivated by the want to maintain trout populations. Mill Creek was originally a brook trout stream, and brown trout were introduced in 1940 and 1950. Between 1982 and 1991, the human resources for creek rehabilitation were provided by a variety of Special Employment programs: the KW Fly Fishers, Galt Sportsman Club, Anti-Recession programs, and summer students. In 1993, the Ontario Ministries of Environment and Energy and of Natural Resources published subwatershed planning guidelines. The goal of these guidelines was to promote an early, integrated, effective, and ecosystem-based approach to land and subwatershed planning. This document served as a basis for the Mill Creek Subwatershed Plan. The subwatershed plan was published in June 1996, which characterized the subwatershed environmental system and proposed a management plan for the creek and surrounding area.

== Biodiversity ==
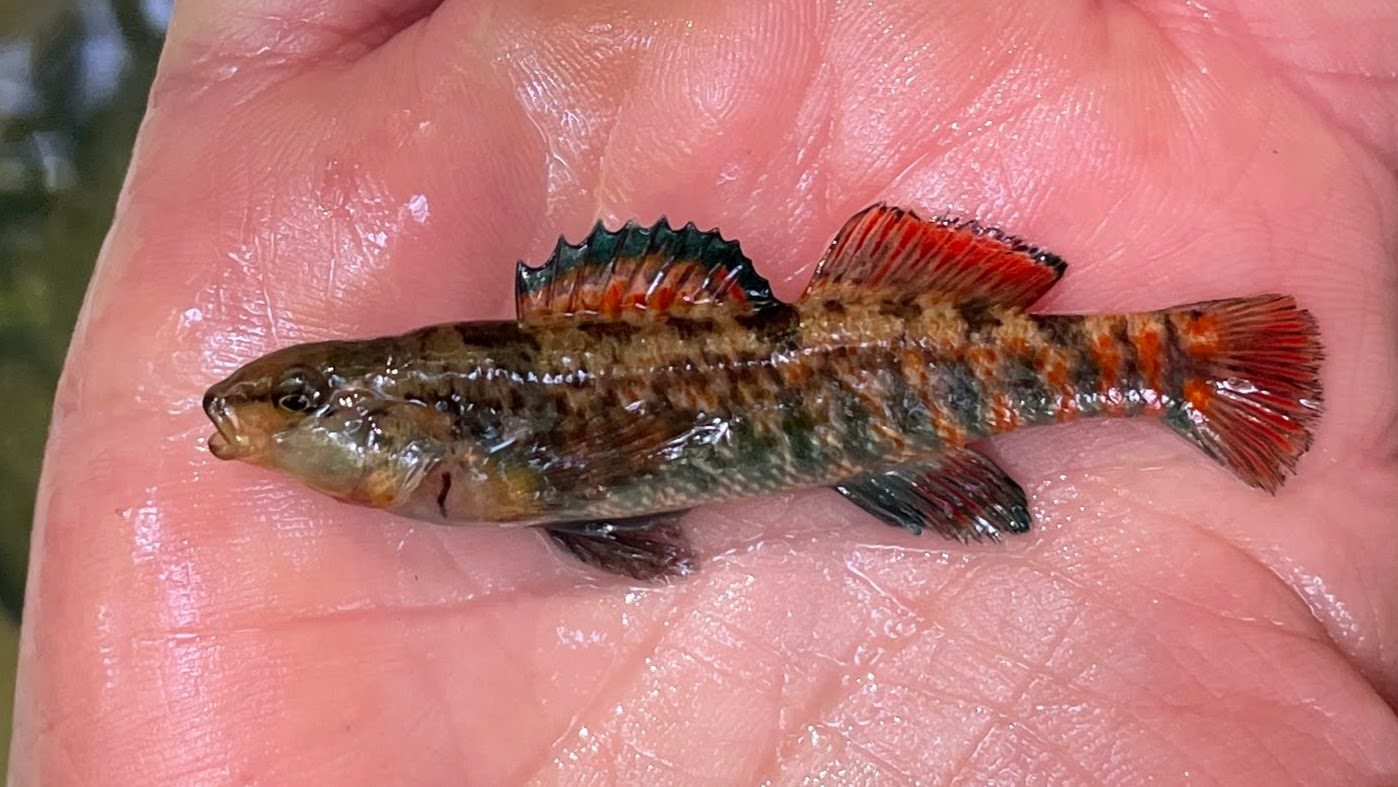
Etheostoma caeruleum (Rainbow darter) captured from Mill Creek

=== Valued ecosystem components ===
Valued ecosystem components (VEC) are borne from a combination of scientific and societal ideals, and provide insight into impact analysis, mitigation, and monitoring. In Mill Creek, two species that unmistakably serve as VECs are brook trout and brown trout. Both species inhabit some but not all stretches of Mill Creek, and are highly sought after by the local angler community.

The cool and well-oxygenated water of Mill Creek is the ideal habitat for brook trout that optimally live at 14 °C to 16 °C. Some populations of brook trout are amphidromous and others seasonally migrate between lakes and tributary streams. When not migrating between streams, brook trout can also move great distances within streams in response to seasonal and spawning needs – which occur in the late summer and fall. They are opportunistic feeders, with a diet comprising both vertebrates and invertebrates. Brook trout are an ecologically important species, having the capacity to affect the growth and survival of cohabitating species through competition, preying, or hybridization.

While brook trout are native to Eastern North America, brown trout are native to Europe, North Africa, and West Asia and have been in and naturalized to Ontario streams in 1913. The provincial government has been stocking brown trout in certain stretches of Mill Creek on an annual basis since at least 2014. The number of individuals stocked in the creek nearly doubled from 507 in 2023 to 1000 in 2024.

Brook trout can survive in a large range of temperatures and oxygen concentrations, being found throughout stream-fed pools and ponds, calm, quiet waters, and faster, turbulent streams. They are capable of inhabiting 0 °C to 27 °C but can only reproduce between 0 °C to 10 °C; spawning occurs in October and November. Some brown trout display amphidromous behavior, while others remain for their entire life in their home stream. These fish feed most aggressively during the night and are opportunistic feeders. What makes brown trout ecologically important is their capacity to survive in a broader temperature and oxygen range than other native species, namely the brook trout. In this respect they have the capacity to prey on and out-compete brook trout, altering the naturally occurring fauna of Ontario streams.

=== Invasive species ===
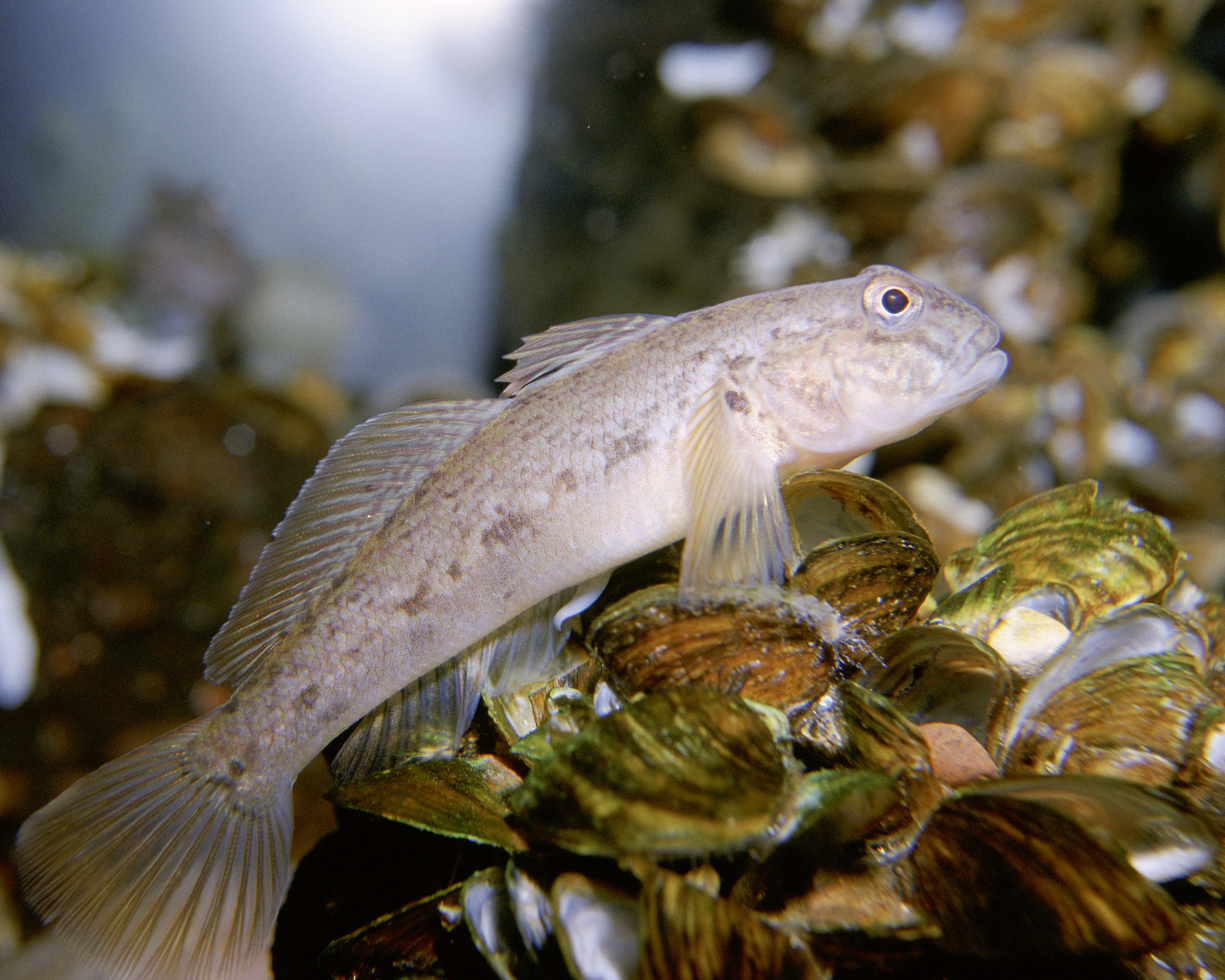
Neogobius melanostomus (round goby)

Within the Grand River watershed, there are several invasive species of concern that may be currently present in Mill Creek or invade the region in the future.

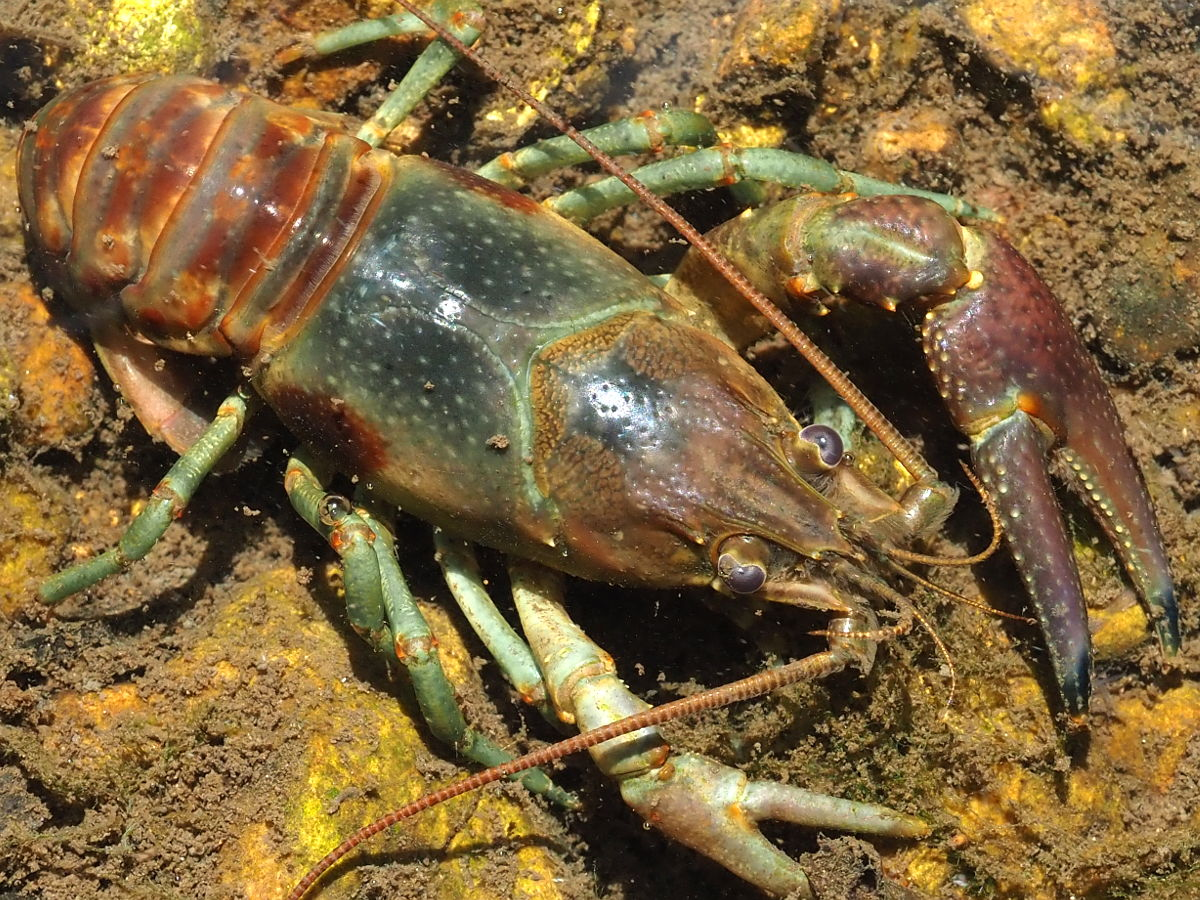
Faxonius rusticus (rusty crayfish)

Aquatic invasive species of concern include Neogobius melanostomus (round goby), Petromyzon marinus (sea lamprey), Faxonius rusticus (rusty crayfish), and Dreissena polymorpha (zebra mussels). Round gobies are invading inland water from the Great Lakes, where they negatively impact ecosystems by eating the eggs of native fish. The GRCA reports that round goby is present as far north in the watershed as Belwood Lake, and the species has been detected in most of the systems surrounding Mill Creek. Parasitic sea lamprey have been detected as far north as the Caledonia Dam in the Grand River watershed, so are not present near Mill Creek yet - although they are likely moving north. Rusty crayfish are spreading through southern Ontario (including the Grand River watershed), and have been detected by the Ministry of Natural Resources near Mill Creek. These crayfish outcompete native crayfish and juvenile fish. Zebra mussels have been detected within the Grand River watershed up to the Dunnville Dam, as well as in Guelph Lake - in the vicinity of Mill Creek.

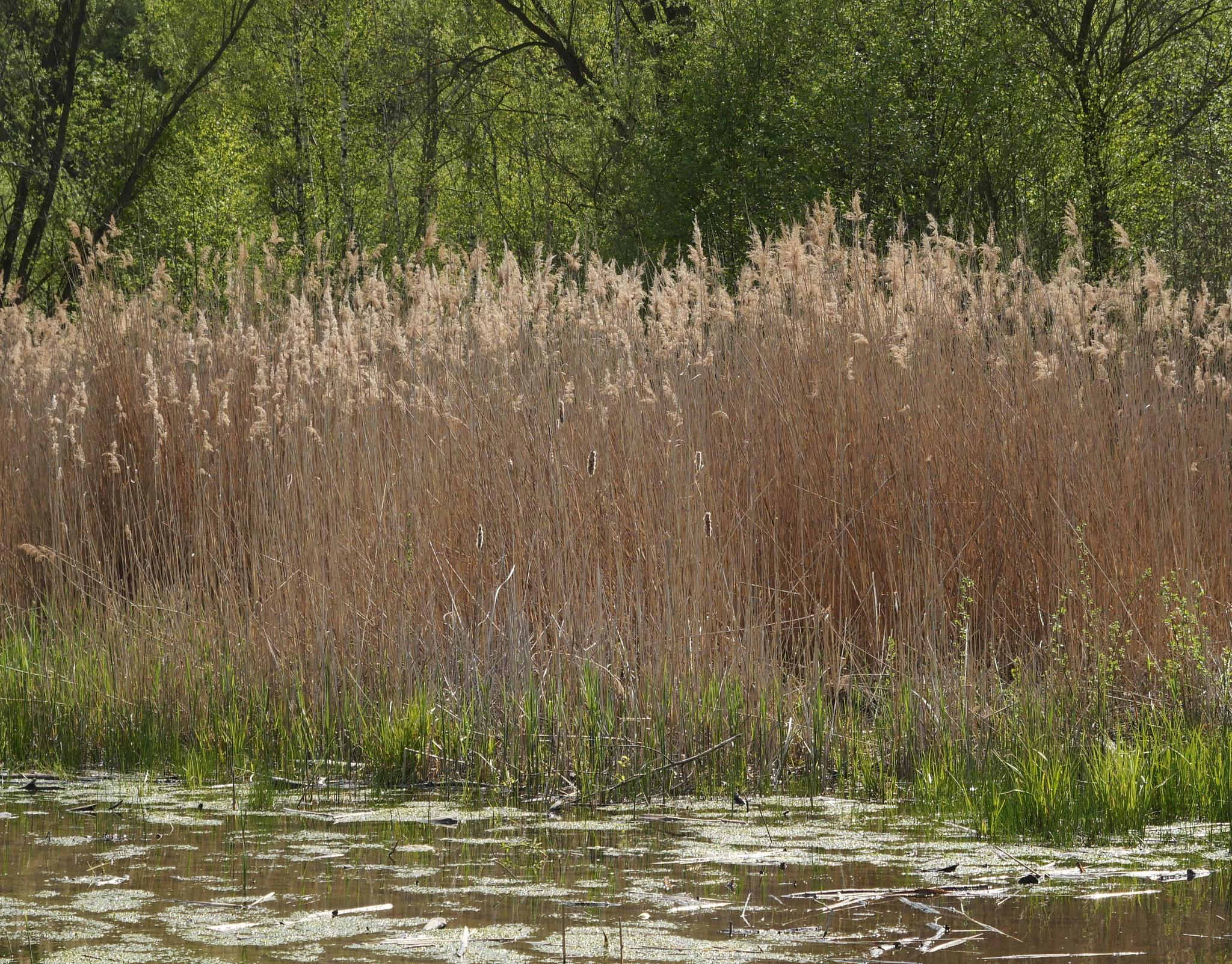
Phragmites australis (common reed grass)

Invasive plants present in the Mill Creek subwatershed include Rhamnus cathartica (European/common buckthorn), Alliaria petiolata (garlic mustard), Phragmites australis (common reed grass), and Lythrum salicaria (purple loosestrife), which threaten native plant species as well as the integrity and functioning of wetland and riparian habitats.

Invasive pathogens that may affect species in the Mill Creek ecosystem include viral hemorrhagic septicemia (VHS), ophidiomycosis (snake fungal disease), Ranavirus spp., and chytridiomycosis. The pathogen VHS (affecting fish) is present in Lake Erie and parts of its tributaries; Mill Creek is located next to a VHS management zone. The fungal pathogen Ophidiomyces ophiodiicola affects native snake species that are present in the Mill Creek subwatershed, including Thamnophis sirtalis sirtalis (eastern garter snake), and has been detected in this region. Viruses in the genus Ranavirus infect reptiles and amphibians, and are distributed across most of Canada. The strain Frog virus 3 (FV3) is prevalent in eastern North America and threatens the frogs, salamanders, and turtles present in the Mill Creek subwatershed. The fungal species Batrachochytrium dendrobatidis and Batrachochytrium salamandrivorans cause chytridiomycosis in amphibian species, leading to detrimental levels of mortality. These pathogens are widespread in wild amphibian populations in Ontario, and have been detected in the vicinity of Mill Creek. Invasive pathogens affecting trees in this region include Dutch elm disease and white pine blister rust - among others.

=== Species at risk ===
The Jefferson salamander (Ambystoma jeffersonianum) was assessed as threatened in 2008 and later changed to endangered in 2011. The two chorus frog (Pseudacris triseriata) species in Ontario are the western and the boreal chorus frog, which are both more often heard than seen. Monarchs (Danaus plexippus) only breed in habitats with milkweed (Asclepias spp.), since it is the only plants the caterpillars feed on. There are many birds at risk throughout the Mill Creek Subwatershed. Some common habitats that need to be protected for these birds to thrive include a mix of tree species, including deciduous, coniferous, and mixed forests, a mix of forested areas and meadows for foraging and nesting, rocky areas, diverse areas including some with little to no vegetation, and diverse ages of plants. Activity that threatens the survival of these species includes outdoor cats attacking nests on forest floors and in lower areas, habitat loss and degradation, car mortalities and changes in food supply related to pesticides, and habitat loss related to fire suppression. Some threats to the survival of turtle species in Mill Creek include loss or fragmenting of habitat, motor vehicles, raccoons and foxes that prey on eggs, as well as illegal collection for the pet trade, and adult mortality since many turtles are slow breeders. Habitats in Mill Creek where the eastern milksnake (Lampropeltis triangulum) would be found include meadows, deciduous, coniferous, and mixed forests, areas of high forest cover, man-made structures such as barns for hibernation, near water sources such as marshes and swamps. The dense blazing star is a perennial wildflower that can grow as tall as two meters. It grows in moist prairies and wet areas. It does not do well in the shade and is usually found in sunny areas kept open by fire, floods, drought, or grazing. It is threatened by habitat loss due to development or habitat alteration, as well as invasive plants such as European common reed (Phragmites australis).

== Physical attributes ==
=== Aggregate pits ===
==== CBM McNally Pit ====
The CBM (Canada Building Materials) McNally Pit is located on Lots 25 and 26, Concession 2, in the Township of Puslinch. The CBM McNally East Pit is located adjacent to and southeast of the McNally Pit, on Part Lot 27. Both pits are licensed for extraction of aggregates from below the water table, and the McNally Pit possesses a Permit to Take Water. Aggregates from both sites as well as other local CBM sites are washed and processed at the McNally Pit. While extraction below the water table is occurring, monitoring wells around the perimeter of the pit and a staff gauge measuring surface water elevation are maintained. As per the site's 2020-2021 Groundwater Monitoring Program, the McNally Pit appears to have no adverse effects on the local groundwater system, but pond levels were above the Early Warning Threshold in 2020 and 2021.

==== CBM McMillan Pit ====
The McMillan Gravel Pit is located at Concession 2, Township of Puslinch. It is no longer operational, with extraction stopping in 2004. Tributary 3 of Mill Creek is the closest groundwater discharge to this site and accurately represents the groundwater discharge quality passing through the McMillan Gravel Pit. Benthic macroinvertebrate sampling of Tributary 3 of Mill Creek and calculation of the water quality index based on BioMAP (Biological Monitoring and Assessment Program) methods are used to qualitatively evaluate and monitor the site's water quality. Analysis started in 1997 before extraction stopped. The 2023 benthic macroinvertebrate sampling did not observe any negative impacts to water quality due to extraction on the site.

==== CBM Lanci Pit ====
The CBM Lanci Gravel Pit is located on Part Lot 25, Concession 1, in the Township of Puslinch. Weekly water level monitoring is conducted on the site, and it is licensed for Category 1 Class "A" below-water extraction. Above-water extraction operations began in April 2012 and below water extraction began in July 2013, with no extraction on the site between 2019 and 2022. According to the 2022 Groundwater Monitoring Data, groundwater beneath the pit flows in a generally southwest direction, and site operations did not impact water levels.

==== CBM Neubauer Pit ====
The CBM Neubauer Lit is located on Part Lot 27, Concession 1, in the Township of Puslinch. The site's 2023 Groundwater Monitoring Data noted that overall groundwater levels remained within historical ranges for that year, and that no change occurred to water table gradients nor groundwater flow patterns.

==== Dufferin Aggregates ====
Located on lot 24, Concession Rd 1 and partially on lots 21, 22, 23 and 24, on Concession Rd 2, the Dufferin Aggregates pit is a 1.884 km^{2} -property owned by the University of Guelph and operated by Dufferin Aggregates. Extraction at this site started in 1995 and presently has four large open water bodies where aggregate was extracted below the water table.

==== LaFarge Pit ====
Located at 7051 Wellington Rd 124, on the South side of Highway 124, in the townships of Guelph-Eramosa and Puslinch, the LaFarge pit has been in operation for almost 50 years. It has operated as a sand and gravel quarry, and also hosts a ready-mix concrete plant and an asphalt plant operated by another company under a lease. The site is being readied to commence aggregate production once more. It requires an amendment to the existing Permit to Take Water, and an industrial Sewage Works Approval.

=== BlueTriton Brands ===
Formerly Nestle Canada, BlueTriton has been an employer in Wellington County for over 20 years. The company bottles water at the Aberfoyle facility in Puslinch. Pumping began in 2000. The company possesses a Permit to Take Water, being allowed to withdraw up to 2,500 litres per minute, totalling up to a maximum of 3,600,000 litres per day.

== Development ==
=== Land use and agriculture ===
In the Aberfoyle area, the number of local roads as well as the size of aggregate pits has increased. The number of residences in Puslinch is increasing much faster than the population. Agriculture is a critical part of Wellington County's local economy, and the Puslinch area and landowners depend on it.

=== Road expansions ===
The first phase of the transportation system improvements to the Highway 6 corridor between Freelton and Guelph was concluded in 2020 with the completion of the replacement of the Concession Rd 7 bridge over Highway 401. Phase two of the project includes the Class Environmental Assessment (EA), detail design, and construction of the Highway 6/Hanlon expressway midblock Interchange, a new Interchange on Highway 6.

There is also a planned expansion of Highway 6 from North of Freelton to Malty Rd. The traffic on the Hanlon expressway will be maintained for the majority of construction, with some temporary lane closures. Construction is expected to be completed by late 2025. There will be a widening of Highway 401 from 6 lanes to 10 lanes between the interchange with the new Highway 6 North alignment to Highway 6 South. Additionally, there will be construction of a local connection road in the Township of Puslinch.

== Conservation ==
=== Shade's Mills Conservation Area ===
Shade's Mills Conservation Area is a publicly accessible GRCA conservation area in Cambridge, with access to hiking trails and fishing along Mill Creek and the Shade's Mills Reservoir it fills. This site has been visited by the rangers consistently to perform restoration work, including trail maintenance and the removal of dams and fallen trees to improve flow. Recently, the rangers have also focused on removing invasive dog-strangling vine (Cynanchum rossicum/Vincetoxicum rossicum and C. nigrum/V. nigrum) and phragmites (Phragmites australis) along this stretch

== Major studies ==
=== 1996 Mill Creek Subwatershed Plan ===
The Mill Creek Subwatershed Plan is a 500+ page document created in 1996 for the Grand River Conservation Authority by several consulting companies. It is accessible on the City of Cambridge's "Subwatershed Studies" website. The study has several goals, as stated in section 1.4: Study Goals and Objectives, and are summarized here:

- Characterize the environmental components of the Mill Creek Subwatershed
- Identify human impacts on the subwatershed system
- Develop a management plan to provide guidance to local governments and organizations and identify specific areas that are appropriate for development

Other more specific goals towards environmental and resource management are depicted in Table 1.2 in the document and are summarized here:

- Restore and protect water quality, aquatic resources, and water supplies
- Conserve, protect, and restore natural areas and resources
- Minimize threats to life and destruction of natural resources and property
- Restore, protect, and develop various ecological and cultural amenities
- Recognize and encourage public participation in the development and implementation of the subwatershed plan

The subwatershed plan itself is a robust document that covers 6 main topics: public consultation approach (Section 2); description of physical resources (Section 3); functional assessment and greenspace system (Section 4); potential impacts of future development (Section 5); analysis of other subwatershed issues; and the Mill Creek Subwatershed Plan. An overview of each of these sections can be found below:

Section 2: Public Consultation Approach describes various community issues, challenges with creating the subwatershed plan, the importance of values, beliefs, and behaviours, and more.

Section 3: Description of Physical Resources describes aspects of the physical environment within the Mill Creek Subwatershed. Some topics highlighted in this section include, but are not limited to: fluvial geomorphology, such as bed sediment characteristics and stream erosional impacts and sensitivity; aquatic resources, such as aquatic habitat conditions and benthic invertebrate community composition; and terrestrial resources, such as vegetation, significant areas, and classified wetlands.

Section 4: Functional Assessment and Greenspace System describes the identification and development of greenspaces within the Mill Creek Subwatershed.

Section 5: Potential Impacts of Future Development...

== Friends of Mill Creek ==
Friends of Mill Creek is a volunteer group composed of environmentalists, local industrialists, politicians, landowners and residents focusing on the rehabilitation of the creek. The members meet on the third Wednesday of every month at the Puslinch Community Centre. The community-based organization was founded to implement some of the recommendations of the Mill Creek Subwatershed Study, but its overall goal is to maintain Mill Creek's status as a cold-water stream. The group began with an assessment of water temperatures in the Aberfoyle area. Friends of Mill Creek have been a part of a variety of projects, including fish biomass sampling, in-stream rehabilitation and trail maintenance, dam removals, reforestation and naturalization, and continued temperature monitoring and water sampling.

=== Mill Creek Student Rangers ===
Each summer, four high school students are hired as the Mill Creek Ranger Crew members. Guided by a university student Crew Leader, they aid in restoration efforts. For example, the 2005 Crew removed log jams as part of their in-stream habitat enhancement, and the 2015 Crew built stream deflectors for sediment deposition in the Creek. Every cohort summarizes their work in a Ranger's Report.
