= T. Proctor Hall =

Canadian physician and author (1858 to 1931)

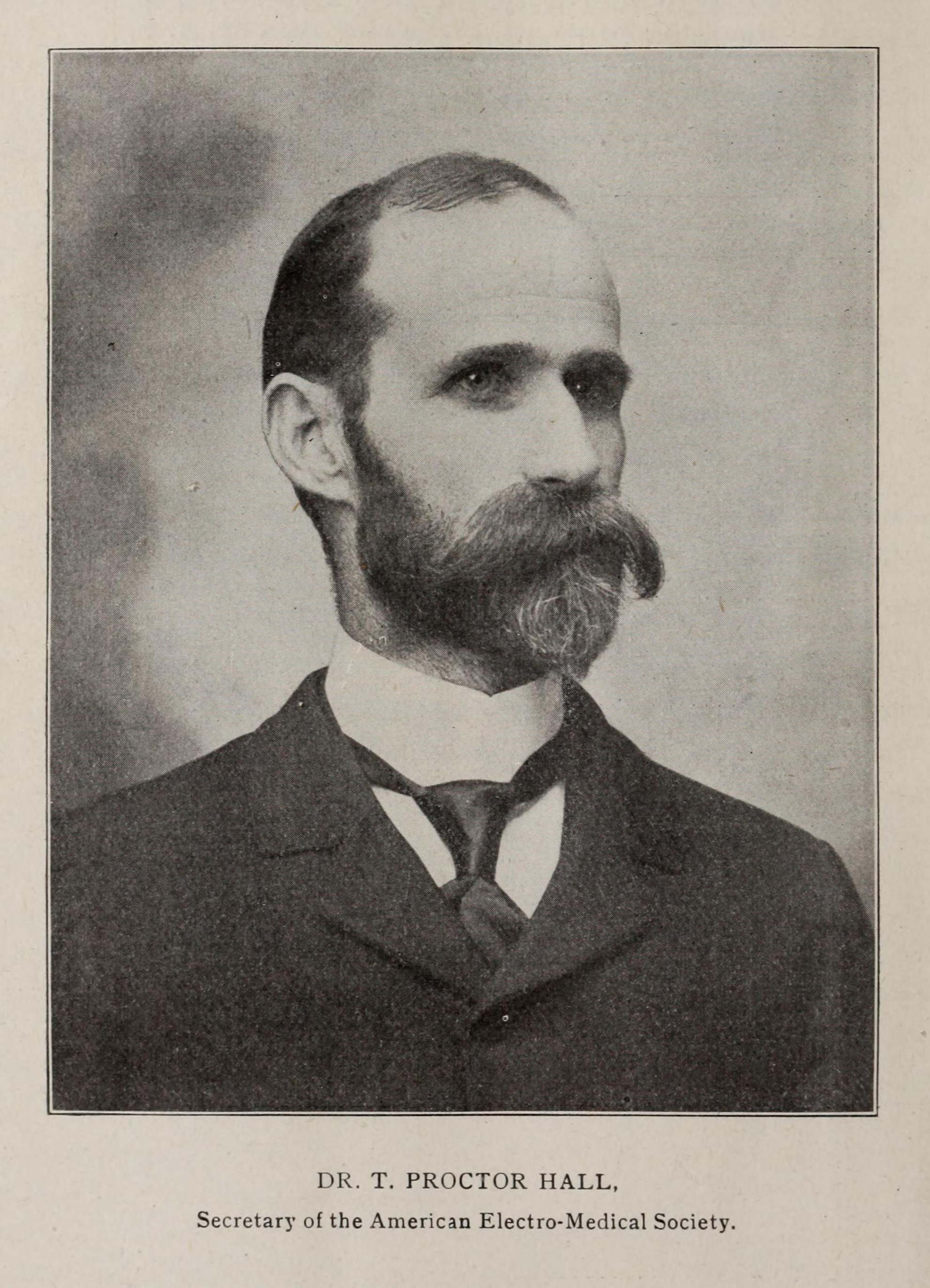
T. Proctor Hall

Thomas Proctor Hall (1858–1931) was a Canadian physician who wrote mathematics, chemistry, physics, theology, and science fiction.

T. Proctor Hall was born October 7, 1858, at Hornby, Canada West. He attended Woodstock College and University of Toronto where in 1882 he obtained a bachelor's degree in chemistry. For two years he was a fellow at University of Toronto, then he served as science master in Woodstock, Ontario, for five years.

He proceeded to Illinois Wesleyan University for his doctorate. He then studied at Clark University where W. E. Story lectured on higher-dimensional space. Hall contributed to the topic with his article "The projection of fourfold figures upon a three-flat". He wrote, "Rotation is essentially motion in a plane, and when another dimension is added to the rotating body, another dimension is also added to the axis of rotation." From 1893 to 96 he was professor of natural science at Tabor Academy, Massachusetts.

Albert A. Michelson was teaching physics at Clark University. Examining methods of determining surface tension, in 1893 Hall published the article "New methods of measuring surface tension of liquids". The following year he contributed an article on stereochemistry to Science. And the next year he wrote on gravitation including the speculative kinetic gravity. From 1897 to 1901 he taught physics in Kansas City.

T. Proctor Hall became a medical doctor in 1902 after study in Chicago at the National Medical College. At the Louisiana Purchase Exposition in St. Louis in 1904 he spoke on "Principles of Electro-therapeutics" at the International Electrical Congress held in connection with the Exposition. From 1902 to 5 he was editor of American X-ray Journal.

In 1905 Hall relocated to Vancouver, British Columbia, where he practiced medicine as Dr. Thomas P. Hall. He was a proponent of heliotherapy and wrote, "Sunshine has been used for ages in the cure of disease; and sunshine is only a very narrow range of ether waves. Now that the fuller range of ether waves is coming under control, we may surely expect to obtain a large increase of power over misfortune and disease," in a science fiction story.

A record of the evolution of University of British Columbia out of McGill College Vancouver cites a meeting of citizens on February 9, 1906, where T. Proctor Hall seconded the following motion: "In the opinion of this meeting the time has arrived when it is advisable for the Province of British Columbia to set about creating a Provincial University."

T. Proctor Hall died in 1931.

== Academy of science ==
T. P. Hall joined the British Columbia Academy of Science (BCAS) at its second meeting. He presented his paper "Scientific Theology" at a meeting December 3, 1910. The following March 4th the BCAS met at his home-office at 1301 Davie Street in Vancouver's West End. Hall was elected vice president for 1911–12. He spoke on "A Theory of Electromagnetism" on November 18 at the McGill University College. Hall was elected President of BCAS on April 13, 1912. In 1913 he was also president, with Charles Hill-Tout of Abbotsford Vice President. The following year Hall served as Secretary-Treasurer while Hill-Tout was president. That year BCAS published seven papers assembled in a book, two by Hall, including "Scientific Theology". The other was "A Geometric Vector Algebra", which included quaternions. In 1916 Hall was official Librarian of BCAS, and he spoke at the December meeting: "A scientific musical scale". That year BCAS acted as host for an excursion to the Point Grey lands destined to become the UBC campus. The BCAS minutes contain a clipping from a published report describing Professor Klinck's preparatory work on campus. BCAS also began the Vancouver Institute lecture series that has supplemented continuing education for adults in the city. On April 20, 1917, Hall spoke on "Sodium thio-silicate beads in blowpipe analysis". He remained Librarian until 1920, when he was also simultaneously Vice President and Auditor. He continued as Auditor until 1923 when he reported on "The Electronic Reactions of Abrams", a controversial topic. The November 26 meeting passed a resolution that speakers should henceforth make a disclaimer that their remarks are not to be understood to be endorsed by BCAS.

As UBC had by then been established, and the sciences were therefore at home in the Province, some members of BCAS began to question its purpose in 1925. But the academy carried on, and in 1947 initiated a series of Science Conferences at which the work of high school students was featured. This series continued until 1961 when the fifteenth and last one was held. BCAS was disbanded in 1963.
