= Mechanical explanations of gravitation =

Early attempts to explain gravity

Mechanical explanations of gravitation (or kinetic theories of gravitation) are attempts to explain the action of gravity by aid of basic mechanical processes, such as pressure forces caused by pushes, without the use of any action at a distance. These theories were developed from the 16th until the 19th century in connection with the aether. However, such models are no longer regarded as viable theories within the mainstream scientific community because general relativity is now the standard model to describe gravitation without the use of actions at a distance. Modern "quantum gravity" hypotheses also attempt to describe gravity by more fundamental processes such as particle fields, but they are not based on classical mechanics.

== Screening ==
This theory is probably the best-known mechanical explanation, and was developed for the first time by Nicolas Fatio de Duillier in 1690, and re-invented, among others, by Georges-Louis Le Sage (1748), Lord Kelvin (1872), and Hendrik Lorentz (1900), and criticized by James Clerk Maxwell (1875), and Henri Poincaré (1908).

The theory posits that the force of gravity is the result of tiny particles or waves moving at high speed in all directions, throughout the universe. The intensity of the flux of particles is assumed to be the same in all directions, so an isolated object A is struck equally from all sides, resulting in only an inward-directed pressure but no net directional force. With a second object B present, however, a fraction of the particles that would otherwise have struck A from the direction of B is intercepted, so B works as a shield, so-to-speak—that is, from the direction of B, A will be struck by fewer particles than from the opposite direction. Likewise, B will be struck by fewer particles from the direction of A than from the opposite direction. One can say that A and B are "shadowing" each other, and the two bodies are pushed toward each other by the resulting imbalance of forces.

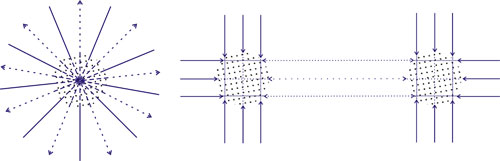
P5: Permeability, attenuation and mass proportionality

This shadow obeys the inverse square law, because the imbalance of momentum flow over an entire spherical surface enclosing the object is independent of the size of the enclosing sphere, whereas the surface area of the sphere increases in proportion to the square of the radius. To satisfy the need for mass proportionality, the theory posits that a) the basic elements of matter are very small so that gross matter consists mostly of empty space, and b) that the particles are so small, that only a small fraction of them would be intercepted by gross matter. The result is, that the "shadow" of each body is proportional to the surface of every single element of matter.

Criticism: This theory was declined primarily for thermodynamic reasons because a shadow only appears in this model if the particles or waves are at least partly absorbed, which should lead to an enormous heating of the bodies. Also drag, i.e. the resistance of the particle streams in the direction of motion, is a great problem too. This problem can be solved by assuming superluminal speeds, but this solution largely increases the thermal problems and contradicts special relativity.

== Vortex ==
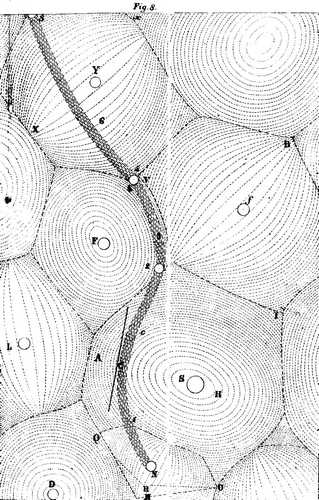
René Descartes' aether vortices around celestial bodies

Because of his philosophical beliefs, René Descartes proposed in 1644 that no empty space can exist and that space must consequently be filled with matter. The parts of this matter tend to move in straight paths, but because they lie close together, they cannot move freely, which according to Descartes implies that every motion is circular, so the aether is filled with vortices. Descartes also distinguishes between different forms and sizes of matter in which rough matter resists the circular movement more strongly than fine matter. Due to centrifugal force, matter tends towards the outer edges of the vortex, which causes a condensation of this matter there. The rough matter cannot follow this movement due to its greater inertia—so due to the pressure of the condensed outer matter those parts will be pushed into the center of the vortex. According to Descartes, this inward pressure is nothing other than gravity. He compared this mechanism with the fact that if a rotating, liquid filled vessel is stopped, the liquid goes on to rotate. Now, if one drops small pieces of light matter (e.g. wood) into the vessel, the pieces move to the middle of the vessel. This idea on the formation of the cosmos by vortices of matter was preceded by the ancient pre-Socratic atomists Leucippus and Democritus.

Following the basic premises of Descartes, Christiaan Huygens between 1669 and 1690 designed a much more exact vortex model. This model was the first theory of gravitation which was worked out mathematically. He assumed that the aether particles are moving in every direction, but were thrown back at the outer borders of the vortex and this causes (as in the case of Descartes) a greater concentration of fine matter at the outer borders. So also in his model the fine matter presses the rough matter into the center of the vortex. Huygens also found out that the centrifugal force is equal to the force that acts in the direction of the center of the vortex (centripetal force). He also posited that bodies must consist mostly of empty space so that the aether can penetrate the bodies easily, which is necessary for mass proportionality. He further concluded that the aether moves much faster than the falling bodies. At this time, Newton developed his theory of gravitation which is based on attraction, and although Huygens agreed with the mathematical formalism, he said the model was insufficient due to the lack of a mechanical explanation of the force law. Newton's discovery that gravity obeys the inverse square law surprised Huygens and he tried to take this into account by assuming that the speed of the aether is smaller in greater distance.

Criticism: Newton objected to the theory because drag must lead to noticeable deviations of the orbits which were not observed. Another problem was that moons often move in different directions, against the direction of the vortex motion. Also, Huygens' explanation of the inverse square law is circular, because this means that the aether obeys Kepler's third law. But a theory of gravitation has to explain those laws and must not presuppose them.

In the late nineteenth century, several British physicists, most prominently William Thomson, 1st Baron Kelvin, developed a vortex theory of the atom. While Descartes had outlined three species of matter – each linked respectively to the emission, transmission, and reflection of light – Thomson developed a theory based on a unitary continuum. This vortex theory sought to explain matter and thus gravity as well as provide an alternative model for atoms and molecules. After discussions spanning less than forty years the model was abandoned due to lack of progress.

== Streams ==
In a 1675 letter to Henry Oldenburg, and later to Robert Boyle, Newton wrote the following: [Gravity is the result of] “a condensation causing a flow of ether with a corresponding thinning of the ether density associated with the increased velocity of flow.” He also asserted that such a process was consistent with all his other work and Kepler's Laws of Motion. Newtons' idea of a pressure drop associated with increased velocity of flow was mathematically formalised as Bernoulli's principle published in Daniel Bernoulli's book Hydrodynamica in 1738.

However, although he later proposed a second explanation (see section below), Newton's comments to that question remained ambiguous. In the third letter to Bentley in 1692 he wrote:

It is inconceivable that inanimate brute matter should, without the mediation of something else which is not material, operate upon and affect other matter, without mutual contact, as it must do if gravitation in the sense of Epicurus be essential and inherent in it. And this is one reason why I desired you would not ascribe 'innate gravity' to me. That gravity should be innate, inherent, and essential to matter, so that one body may act upon another at a distance, through a vacuum, without the mediation of anything else, by and through which their action and force may be conveyed from one to another, is to me so great an absurdity, that I believe no man who has in philosophical matters a competent faculty of thinking can ever fall into it. Gravity must be caused by an agent acting constantly according to certain laws; but whether this agent be material or immaterial, I have left to the consideration of my readers.

On the other hand, Newton is also well known for the phrase Hypotheses non fingo, written in 1713:

I have not as yet been able to discover the reason for these properties of gravity from phenomena, and I do not feign hypotheses. For whatever is not deduced from the phenomena must be called a hypothesis; and hypotheses, whether metaphysical or physical, or based on occult qualities, or mechanical, have no place in experimental philosophy. In this philosophy particular propositions are inferred from the phenomena, and afterwards rendered general by induction.

And according to the testimony of some of his friends, such as Nicolas Fatio de Duillier or David Gregory, Newton thought that gravitation is based directly on divine influence.

Similar to Newton, but mathematically in greater detail, Bernhard Riemann assumed in 1853 that the gravitational aether is an incompressible fluid and normal matter represents sinks in this aether. So if the aether is destroyed or absorbed proportionally to the masses within the bodies, a stream arises and carries all surrounding bodies into the direction of the central mass. Riemann speculated that the absorbed aether is transferred into another world or dimension.

Another attempt to solve the energy problem was made by Ivan Osipovich Yarkovsky in 1888. Based on his aether stream model, which was similar to that of Riemann, he argued that the absorbed aether might be converted into new matter, leading to a mass increase of the celestial bodies.

Criticism: As in the case of Le Sage's theory, the disappearance of energy without explanation violates the energy conservation law. Also some drag must arise, and no process which leads to a creation of matter is known.

== Static pressure ==
Newton updated the second edition of Optics (1717) with another mechanical-ether theory of gravity. Unlike his first explanation (1675 – see Streams), he proposed a stationary aether which gets thinner and thinner nearby the celestial bodies. On the analogy of the lift, a force arises, which pushes all bodies to the central mass. He minimized drag by stating an extremely low density of the gravitational aether.

Like Newton, Leonhard Euler presupposed in 1760 that the gravitational aether loses density in accordance with the inverse square law. Similarly to others, Euler also assumed that to maintain mass proportionality, matter consists mostly of empty space.

Criticism: Both Newton and Euler gave no reason why the density of that static aether should change. Furthermore, James Clerk Maxwell pointed out that in this "hydrostatic" model "the state of stress... which we must suppose to exist in the invisible medium, is 3000 times greater than that which the strongest steel could support".

== Waves ==
Robert Hooke speculated in 1671 that gravitation is the result of all bodies emitting waves in all directions through the aether. Other bodies, which interact with these waves, move in the direction of the source of the waves. Hooke saw an analogy to the fact that small objects on a disturbed surface of water move to the center of the disturbance.

A similar theory was worked out mathematically by James Challis from 1859 to 1876. He calculated that the case of attraction occurs if the wavelength is large in comparison with the distance between the gravitating bodies. If the wavelength is small, the bodies repel each other. By a combination of these effects, he also tried to explain all other forces.

Criticism: Maxwell objected that this theory requires a steady production of waves, which must be accompanied by an infinite consumption of energy. Challis himself admitted, that he hadn't reached a definite result due to the complexity of the processes.

== Pulsation ==
Lord Kelvin (1871) and Carl Anton Bjerknes (1871) assumed that all bodies pulsate in the aether. This was in analogy to the fact that, if the pulsation of two spheres in a fluid is in phase, they will attract each other; and if the pulsation of two spheres is not in phase, they will repel each other. This mechanism was also used for explaining the nature of electric charges. Among others, this hypothesis has also been examined by George Gabriel Stokes and Woldemar Voigt.

Criticism : To explain universal gravitation, one is forced to assume that all pulsations in the universe are in phase—which appears very implausible. In addition, the aether should be incompressible to ensure that attraction also arises at greater distances. And Maxwell argued that this process must be accompanied by a permanent new production and destruction of aether.

== Other historical speculations ==
In 1690, Pierre Varignon assumed that all bodies are exposed to pushes by aether particles from all directions, and that there is some sort of limitation at a certain distance from the Earth's surface which cannot be passed by the particles. He assumed that if a body is closer to the Earth than to the limitation boundary, then the body would experience a greater push from above than from below, causing it to fall toward the Earth.

In 1748, Mikhail Lomonosov assumed that the effect of the aether is proportional to the complete surface of the elementary components of which matter consists (similar to Huygens and Fatio before him). He also assumed an enormous penetrability of the bodies. However, no clear description was given by him as to how exactly the aether interacts with matter so that the law of gravitation arises.

In 1821, John Herapath tried to apply his co-developed model of the kinetic theory of gases on gravitation. He assumed that the aether is heated by the bodies and loses density so that other bodies are pushed to these regions of lower density. However, it was shown by Taylor that the decreased density due to thermal expansion is compensated for by the increased speed of the heated particles; therefore, no attraction arises.

== Recent theorizing ==
These mechanical explanations for gravity never gained widespread acceptance, although such ideas continued to be studied occasionally by physicists until the beginning of the twentieth century, by which time it was generally considered to be conclusively discredited. However, some researchers outside the scientific mainstream still try to work out some consequences of those theories.

Le Sage's theory was studied by Radzievskii and Kagalnikova (1960), Shneiderov (1961), Buonomano and Engels (1976), Adamut (1982), and Edwards (2014).

Gravity due to static pressure was recently studied by Arminjon.

== See also ==
- History of gravitational theory
- Le Sage's theory of gravitation

== Sources ==
- Aiton, E.J. (1969), "Newton's Aether-Stream Hypothesis and the Inverse Square Law of Gravitation", Annals of Science, 25 (3): 255–260, doi:10.1080/00033796900200151
- Carrington, Hereward (1913), Sugden, Sherwood J. B (ed.), "Earlier Theories of Gravity", The Monist, 23 (3): 445–458, doi:10.5840/monist19132332
- Drude, Paul (1897), "Ueber Fernewirkungen", Annalen der Physik, 298 (12): I–XLIX, Bibcode:1897AnP...298D...1D, doi:10.1002/andp.18972981220
- Hall, Thomas Proctor (1895), "Physical Theories of Gravitation" , Proceedings of the Iowa Academy of Science, 3: 47–52
- Helm, Georg (1881), "Ueber die Vermittelung der Fernewirkungen durch den Aether", Annalen der Physik, 250 (9): 149–176, Bibcode:1881AnP...250..149H, doi:10.1002/andp.18812500912
- Isenkrahe, Caspar (1892), "Über die Rückführung der Schwere auf Absorption und die daraus abgeleiteten Gesetze", Abhandlungen zur Geschichte der Mathematik, vol. 6, Leipzig, pp. 161–204
- Maxwell, James Clerk (1878), "Atom" , in Baynes, T. S. (ed.), Encyclopædia Britannica, vol. 3 (9th ed.), New York: Charles Scribner's Sons, pp. 36–49
- Maxwell, James Clerk (1878), "Attraction" , in Baynes, T. S. (ed.), Encyclopædia Britannica, vol. 3 (9th ed.), New York: Charles Scribner's Sons, pp. 63–65
- Peck, J. W. (1903), "The Corpuscular Theories of Gravitation" , Proceedings of the Royal Philosophical Society of Glasgow, 34: 17–44
- Poincaré, Henri (1914) [1908], "Lesage's theory" , Science and Method, London, New York: Nelson & Sons, pp. 246–253
- Preston, Samuel Tolver (1895), "Comparative Review of some Dynamical Theories of Gravitation" , Philosophical Magazine, 5th series, 39 (237): 145–159, doi:10.1080/14786449508620698
- Taylor, William Bower (1876), "Kinetic Theories of Gravitation" , Smithsonian Report: 205–282
- Van Lunteren, F. (2002), "Nicolas Fatio de Duillier on the mechanical cause of Gravitation", in Edwards, M.R. (ed.), Pushing Gravity: New Perspectives on Le Sage's Theory of Gravitation, Montreal: C. Roy Keys Inc., pp. 41–59
- Zehe, Horst (1980), "Die Gravitationstheorie des Nicolas Fatio de Duillier", Archive for History of Exact Sciences, vol. 28, Hildesheim: Gerstenberg, pp. 1–23, Bibcode:1983AHES...28....1Z, doi:10.1007/BF00327787, ISBN 3-8067-0862-2, S2CID 123509380
- Zenneck, Jonathan (1903), "Gravitation", Encyklopädie der Mathematischen Wissenschaften mit Einschluss ihrer Anwendungen, vol. 5, pp. 25–67, doi:10.1007/978-3-663-16016-8_2, ISBN 978-3-663-15445-7
