= Port Maitland, Ontario =

Coordinates: 42.867°N 79.567°W

There is also a Port Maitland in the province of Nova Scotia; see Port Maitland, Nova Scotia.

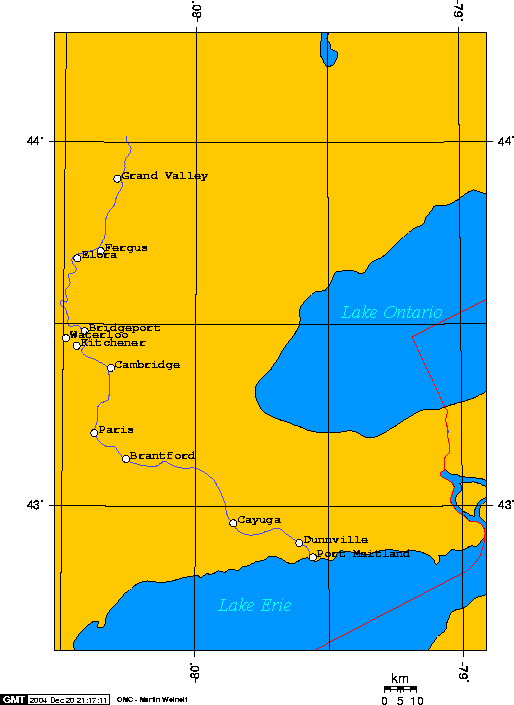
Grand River, Ontario

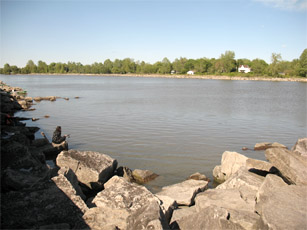
The Grand River in Port Maitland, near the confluence with Lake Erie.

Port Maitland is a community of approximately 100 people in Haldimand County, Ontario, Canada. It is on the North shore of Lake Erie at the mouth of the Grand River.

At one time a canal connected the Welland Canal to the Grand River. It was once a thriving commercial fishing village. It is the home of the former Maitland Arms Hotel, a thriving rock n' roll venue from the late 1960s to mid 1970s.

== Economy ==
Port Maitland is home to International Marine Salvage. IMS was responsible for the scrapping of two Oberon-class submarines HMCS Okanagan and HMS Olympus (S12) for the Royal Canadian Navy.
