= Marpole Midden =

Midden pile in British columbia

Coordinates: 49°12′14″N 123°08′19″W

Marpole Midden National Historic Site
- c̓əsnaʔəm
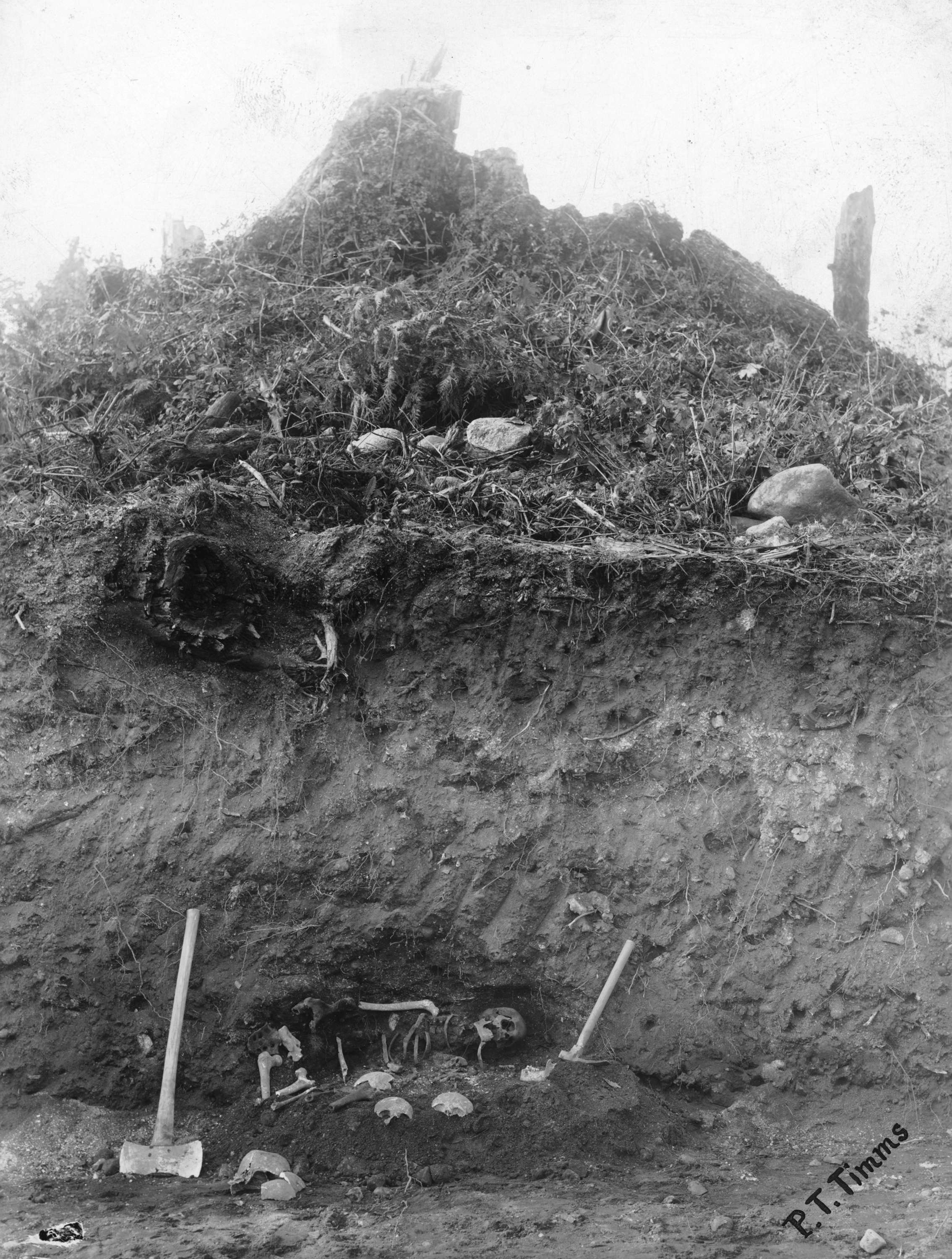
- 1908 excavation
- Location: Vancouver, British Columbia, Canada
- Type: National Historic Site of Canada
- Website: Marpole Midden National Historic Site of Canada

National Historic Site of Canada
- Official name: Marpole Midden National Historic Site of Canada
- Designated: 1933

The Marpole Midden, also known by archaeologists as the Great Fraser Midden or Eburne site, is a 4000-year-old midden near the mouth of the Fraser River, in the Marpole neighbourhood of Vancouver, British Columbia. The site is the location of the ancient Musqueam village of c̓əsnaʔəm and a sacred burial ground.

The midden was discovered in 1884 and it was declared a National Historic Site of Canada in 1933. Non-native archeologists excavated the site until a hotel was built on the land in 1955. There was a series of disputes over land rights and contested development projects until the site's land was returned to the Musqueam First Nation in 2018.

== History ==
The site was inhabited by Coast Salish people beginning at least 4,000 years ago, until about 200 years ago, with the arrival of smallpox on the Northwest Coast. During that time it was a village known as c̓əsnaʔəm. According to BC Heritage Industry Canada site, the Marpole Culture Type dates between 2400 BP and 1600 years BP.

In 1884 the midden was unearthed during the upgrading of Garypie Farm Road, and was the site of archeological excavation throughout the subsequent decades. In 1892, Charles Hill-Tout did extensive excavations at the site for the Art, Historical, and Scientific Association of Vancouver, stimulating study of other middens in the region. American Museum of Natural History archeologist, Harlan Ingersoll Smith, participating in the Jesup North Pacific Expedition from 1897 to 1899, mined the Marpole site for skeletal remains.

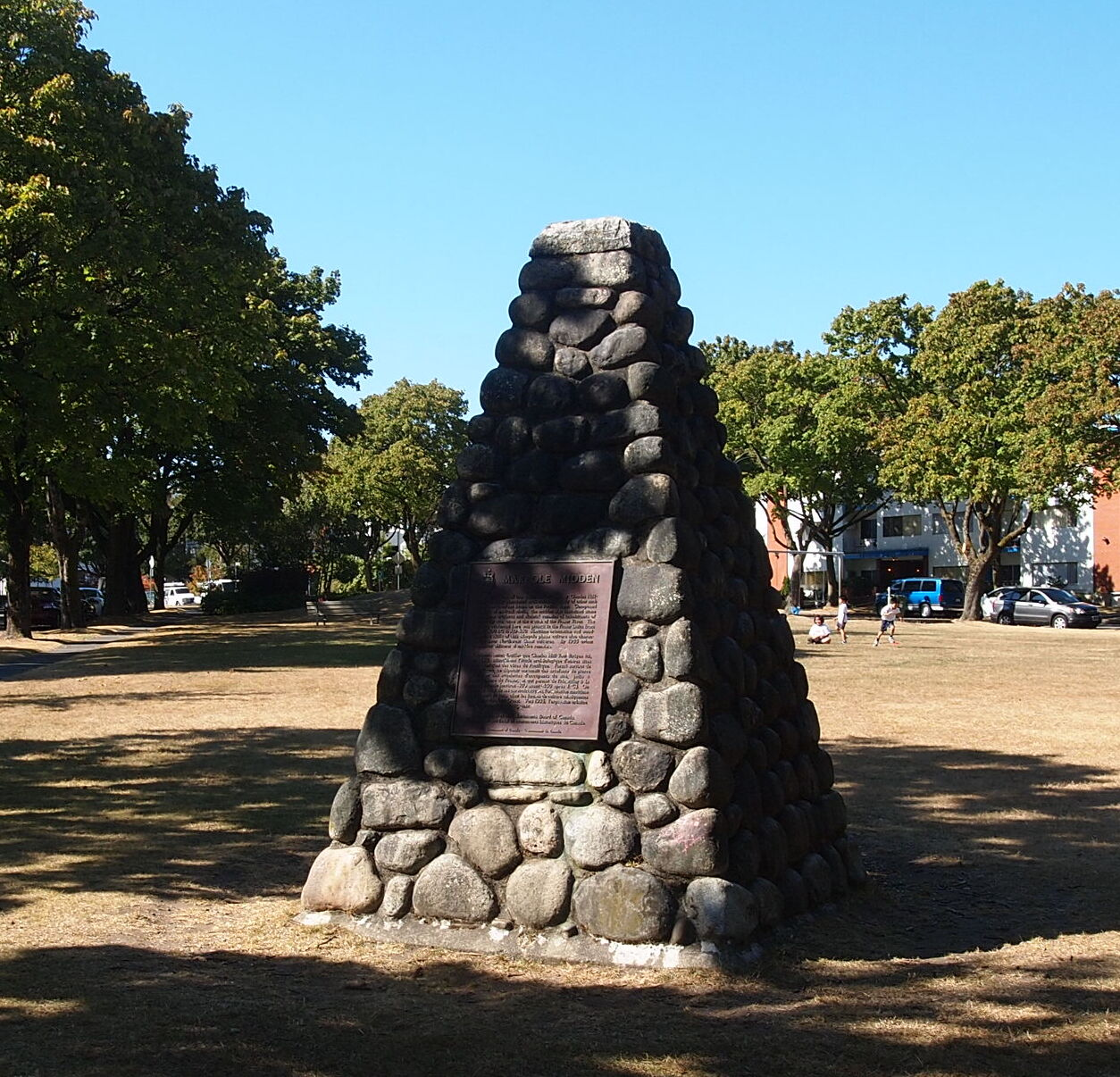
Marpole Midden plaque in Marpole Park

On May 25, 1933, the Marpole Midden was recognized as a National Historic Site of Canada, although the historic marker is located in nearby Marpole Park, while the midden itself is located a few blocks away, between Montcalm and Milton streets, south of Marine Drive.

In the 1950s and 1960s UBC professor Charles Edward Borden undertook salvage archeology projects at the site. Borden "was the first to draw links between contemporary Musqueam peoples and excavated remains."

The construction of the Fraser Arms Hotel in the 1950s destroyed much of the site.

In December 2011, a development permit was issued for the construction of a 108-unit condominium project on the site. Intact remains were found in January 2012 during an archeological dig as required by the permit. In March 2012, Musqueam members disrupted planned digging, claiming there was no consultation prior to the permit being issued in December, and in protest over the continued lack of dialogue. There was a cooling-off period while waiting for negotiations to occur, but protesters returned to the site because, in their opinion, there had been no meaningful progress. Musqueam Band members and the supporters of the Musqueam band staged a series of protests to raise awareness about the site in May 2012. These included a rally at Mountain View Cemetery on May 29, and a blockade of the Arthur Laing Bridge between Richmond and Vancouver on May 31. The Musqueam band ended up purchasing the land from the developer.

In 2018 the land of the site was returned to the Musqueam First Nation.

== Sources ==
- Burley, David V. (1980), Marpole: Anthropological reconstructions of a prehistoric Northwest Coast culture type, Burnaby, B.C.: Department of Archaeology, Simon Fraser University
- "Gateway to Aboriginal Heritage: Harlan Ingersoll Smith", CMC, Gatineau, PQ: Canadian Museum of Civilization, n.d.
- Charles, Andrew (December 1972), "Amateur archaeologists discover past, Pride", Nesika: The Voice of BC Indians, 1 (3), Vancouver, BC
- Fournier, Suzanne (May 29, 2012). "Musqueam protest condo plans on First Nations graveyard in Marpole". The Province.
- Knickerbocker, Madeline (2012), "Review of Susan Roy's These Mysterious People: Shaping History and Archaeology in a Northwest Coast Community", BC Studies (174), archived from the original on December 15, 2013
- Mitchell, Donald (1990), "Prehistory of the Coasts of Southern British Columbia & Northern Washington" (PDF), in Wayne Suttles (ed.), Handbook of North American Indians, vol. 7, Washington: Smithsonian Institution, pp. 340–358
- Musqueam: a living culture|c̓əsnaʔəm, Vancouver, BC: Musqueam Indian Band, 2011, archived from the original on December 7, 2013
- "Marpole Midden National Historic Site of Canada at Parks Canada". Parks Canada.
- "Canada's Historic Places: Marpole Midden National Historic Site of Canada", Canadian Register, Parks Canada, 2010
- Puri, Belle (March 12, 2012). "Protesters block Vancouver building project". CBC News.
- Roy, Susan (Winter 2006–2007). ""Who Were These Mysterious People?" -- ç¢sna:m, the Marpole Midden, and the Dispossession of Aboriginal Lands in British Columbia". BC Studies (152): 67–95. Archived from the original on December 11, 2013.
- Staff Reporter (May 31, 2012). "Musqueam block Arthur Laing Bridge in property-development protest". The Province.
- "kosapsom", BC Heritage, Canada's Digital Collections program, Industry Canada, 1999, archived from the original on May 6, 2014
