= Borden Smith =

Canadian ice hockey player

- Born: May 13, 1943 (age 81); Rouyn-Noranda, Quebec, Canada
- Height: 6 ft 0 in (183 cm)
- Weight: 180 lb (82 kg; 12 st 12 lb)
- Position: Left wing
- Shot: Left
- Played for: Philadelphia Ramblers; Long Island Ducks; Clinton Comets; Baltimore Clippers; Springfield Kings; Cleveland Barons
- Playing career: 1959–1976

Kenneth Borden Smith (born May 13, 1943) is a Canadian former professional hockey player who played 648 games in the Eastern Hockey League, with the Philadelphia Ramblers, Long Island Ducks and Clinton Comets. He also played in the American Hockey League with the Baltimore Clippers, Springfield Kings and Cleveland Barons. He was later a coach after his retirement from hockey. He was inducted into the Greater Utica Sports Hall of Fame in 2000.
