= Frances Borden =

British artist known for portraiture

- Born: November 1970 (age 55); Hammersmith, London, England
- Education: Plymouth College of Art, Foundation Studies, 1992 to 1993; Chelsea College of Art, BA (Hons) Fine Art (Painting), 1993 to 1996
- Known for: Painting, Drawing, Portraiture
- Website: https://francesborden.com

Frances Borden (born November 1970) is a British artist known for portraiture, particularly self-portraiture. She has been a prizewinner in the BP Portrait Award at the National Portrait Gallery in London on three occasions.

== Biography ==
Frances Borden was born in Hammersmith, but raised in rural Devon. She is the younger sister of photographer Harry Borden and artist Nicholas Borden. Alongside being an artist, she is a STAT certified teacher of the Alexander technique.

== Awards ==
- Wells Art Contemporary Award, First Prize, 2012
- Rootstein Hopkins Foundation, Project Grant, 2006
- Arts Council England, Grants for the Arts, 2006
- The BP Portrait Award, Commendations, 1996 and 2000, and Second Prize, 1998
- Hunting Art Prizes, Cornwall Prize, 1999 and Runner Up, Young Artist of the Year, 1997
- Black Swan Open Art Competition, First Prize, 1998
- NatWest 90s Prize for Art, Second Prize, 1996 and Student Prize 1995
