= Harry Borden =

British photographer (born 1965)

- Born: 1965 (age 60–61); New York City, U.S
- Occupation: Photographer
- Children: 4
- Relatives: Nicholas Borden (brother); Frances Borden (sister)

Harry Borden (born 1965) is a British portrait photographer based in London. His subjects have included celebrities and politicians. Examples of Borden's work are held in the collections of the National Portrait Gallery, London and National Portrait Gallery, Australia.

== Early life and education ==
Borden was born in New York and brought up on a farm in Devon. His father, Charles, was a Jewish American who served in the Marines during World War II, whose parents emigrated to the US from Ukraine and Romania, and his mother was a British Christian. He is the brother of painters Nicholas Borden and Frances Borden.

The first photograph Borden developed was of his father with a drove of pigs on their farm, taken when Harry was thirteen years old. He studied photography at Plymouth College of Art and Design (1985–87).

== Career ==
Borden moved to London after graduation, where he worked as an assistant for Lester Bookbinder. He received his first commission from The Observer in 1994. Borden's portraits appeared regularly in this and other Sunday supplements, Harpers & Queen, Vogue and The New Yorker.

In June 2005, he had his first solo exhibition at the National Portrait Gallery (NPG) in London. Harry Borden: On Business included 30 portraits of leading business leaders. The NPG holds more than 100 examples of Borden’s work in its photographic collection.

In 2017 his book Survivor, A Portrait of the Survivors of the Holocaust was published by Octopus. The book had been previously shortlisted for the European Publishers Award for Photography in 2014 and was judged among the 10 best Photography books of 2018 by the Kraszna-Krausz Foundation. In 2021 his second book Single Dad was published by Hoxton Mini Press.

A photo Borden took of comedian Bob Mortimer was used as the front cover of his 2021 autobiography And Away....

In 2023, Borden and his son Fred set up a YouTube channel in which Harry talks about photographing celebrities and what the process of the photo shoots were like. The channel has almost 57,000 subscribers as of October 2026.

=== Photographs ===
Borden has taken photographs of many celebrities including: Jimmy Savile, Spice Girls, Robin Williams, Barney the dinosaur, Run-DMC, Björk, Margaret Thatcher, Martin Scorsese, Oscar Pistorius, Morgan Freeman, Robbie Williams, Michael Hutchence, Richard Branson, Radiohead, Paul McCartney, Martin Parr, Daniel Radcliffe, Quentin Tarantino, Shane MacGowan, Ant McPartlin and Declan Donnelly (Ant & Dec), Zadie Smith, David Soul, Deborah Cavendish, Duchess of Devonshire, Antony Armstrong-Jones, 1st Earl of Snowdon, Gordon Ramsay, Alan Sugar, David Icke, Rupert Grint, Wu-Tang Clan, K.d. lang, Jacob Rees-Mogg, Andrew Cotter, Seal, Hillary Clinton, Tom Daley, Kylie Minogue, Lenny Kravitz, Tony Blair, Bob Geldof, Jürgen Klopp, Keir Starmer, Sophie Okonedo, Cocteau Twins, PJ Harvey, Louis Theroux, Paul Daniels, Debbie McGee, Sarah Ferguson, Kate Beckinsale, Isabella Blow, David Bailey, Viggo Mortensen, Manic Street Preachers, Jilly Cooper, Lionel Messi, Giorgio Armani, Nigella Lawson, Diddy, Dermot Morgan, Fara Williams, Mike Skinner, Noel Gallagher, Primal Scream, Brian Wilson, Happy Mondays, Michael O'Leary, Krzysztof Penderecki, Stephen Merchant, R.E.M., Charlton Heston, Fontaines D.C., Kevin Garnett, Marianne Faithfull, Martin Freeman, Daniel Craig, Boris Johnson, Yotam Ottolenghi, Demi Moore, Damon Albarn, Jarvis Cocker, Ice-T, Bob Mortimer, and Dominic West.

== Personal life ==
Borden has four children. Borden married his first wife, Jane, with whom he had three of his children, in 1995, but their relationship ended with divorce in 2009; Borden stated that initially, after the divorce he was "absolutely horrendous, completely full of shame, really knocked off my path" but they have since reconciled and have formed a friendship.

== Awards ==
- 1997: World Press Photo awards
- 1999: World Press Photo awards
- 1998: John Kobal Photographic Portrait Award, National Portrait Gallery, London
- 2000: John Kobal Photographic Portrait Award, National Portrait Gallery, London
- 2014: Honorary Fellowship of the Royal Photographic Society
- 2018: Environmental Bursary, 2018 Over 30 Recipient, Royal Photographic Society, Bath
