= Carl Borden =

American musician

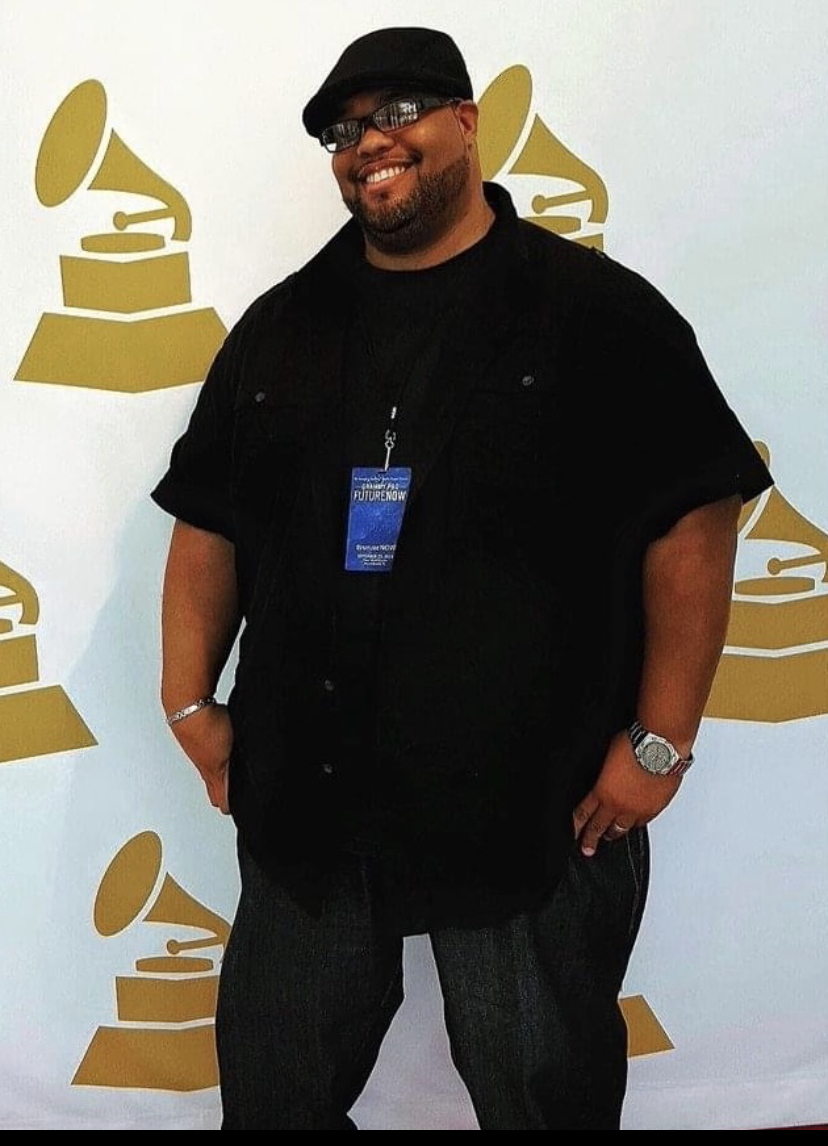
- Composer/Musician Carl Borden

Background information
- Born: Carl Maurice Borden II; January 7, 1977 (age 49)
- Origin: Dayton, Ohio
- Genres: Ambient music, world music, New Age Music
- Occupations: Composer, Musician, Record Producer, Recording Engineer
- Instruments: Keyboards, percussion, drums, synthesizer, guitar
- Years active: 2010–present
- Labels: Myndstream, Real Music, Wayfarer Music Group

Carl Maurice Borden II (born January 7, 1977, in Dayton, Ohio) is an American composer, record producer, recording artist, and engineer of new-age music. A graduate of Valencia College in Orlando, Florida, he is known for his early work with former Atlantic Records recording artist Men At Large. His music has been featured on The Fox television series Scream Queens and the VH1 TV series Single Ladies.

In 2014, Home, co-written and produced by Borden (performed by Dave Tolliver of Men At Large), peaked on the Billboard Hot Singles Sales chart at No. 4.

In 2016, he signed with the New Age music record label Real Music and released his debut new age album Echoes of Bliss which earned two Global Music Awards (Best New Age Album/Production). Music from the album was featured in Voices of the Hill: A Twinsburg Documentary. On April 28, 2017, his second release, Breathe spent eight straight weeks being featured on the iTunes bestseller chart for World Music. Breathe has charted in many countries around the world and on the Zone Music Reporter Charts, debuting at #37. In 2017, he worked as a recording engineer on the album A Musical Journey: Together in Peace by Rupam Sarmah which debuted on the Billboard World Music Charts at #6.

== Discography ==
=== Studio albums ===
- 2016 - Urban Soundscapes
- 2016 - Echoes of Bliss
- 2017 - Breathe
- 2019 - "Morning Embrace"
- 2020 - "Beyond The Sunrise"

=== Single Releases ===
- 2021 - "I’m Alright (Black Mental Health Alliance Theme)" with Michael Whalen (composer)
- 2021 - "Good Morning Light"
- 2022 - "Dreamscapes"

=== Other album appearances ===
- 2014 - Something Like The Greatest
- 2016 - Forest Bathing
- 2017 - Together In Peace: A Musical Journey
- 2021 - "Myndstream’s Summer Flight"
- 2022 - Myndstream's Ambient Sleep EP"
