= 242nd Battalion, CEF =

The 242nd Battalion, CEF was a unit in the Canadian Expeditionary Force during the First World War. Based in Montreal, Quebec, the unit began recruiting sometime in mid-1916 in Montreal and the surrounding district. The unit was absorbed into the Canadian Forestry Corps while still in Canada. The 242nd Battalion, CEF had one Officer Commanding: Lieut-Col. J. B. White.
