= Edwin Howard Borden =

Edwin H. Borden
- Born: Edwin Howard Borden; March 15, 1868; Truro, Nova Scotia
- Died: January 26, 1953 (aged 84); Jefferson, Texas
- Occupations: Pastor; Professor; Author

Edwin Howard Borden (March 15, 1868 – January 26, 1953) was a Canadian-born pastor, professor, and author who was Acadia University's first African Nova Scotian graduate.

== Early life and education ==
Edwin Howard Borden was born in Truro, Nova Scotia, on March 15, 1868, after his parents relocated there from Tracadie, New Brunswick. His early education took place at Truro and Horton academies.

In 1892, he was among Acadia University's Bachelor of Arts graduates. As the first African Nova Scotian to graduate from Acadia University, Borden is regarded as one of the first people of African descent to earn a degree from any Canadian institution or university. Presumably one of the first athletes of African descent at any Canadian university, he played varsity baseball for Acadia. He received his Master of Arts in 1896 from Acadia University.

In 1893, he attended the University of Chicago Divinity School. He graduated with his degree of Bachelor of Divinity on April 1, 1897.

He continued to pursue his studies, attending lectures regularly at the University of Berlin in 1905.

By 1910, he was teaching in Macon, Georgia at the Central City College (now Georgia Baptist College). In 1910, he received an honorary doctorate of Divinity from Baptist College located in Texas.

At Milton University in Baltimore, Borden earned his PhD in 1924.

== Death ==
Edwin Howard Borden died on January 26, 1953, in Beaumont, Jefferson, Texas, in the United States.
