= Katherine Borden =

Researcher

- Occupation: Scientist/Professor

Academic background
- Education: Yale University
- Thesis: Protein folding studies on the thioredoxins derived from Escherichia coli and bacteriophage T4 (1990)
- Doctoral advisor: Fred Richards

Academic work
- Discipline: Molecular Biology
- Institutions: University of Montreal Northwestern University

Katherine Borden PhD FRSC is a Canadian researcher of Molecular Biology and Biochemistry at Northwestern University in Chicago, USA after a long tenure at University of Montreal in Quebec, Canada. She has worked on finding new cancer treatments using pre-existing drugs. She uses a combination of biochemistry, structural biology, cell biological, and clinical studies to study RNA processing. She has received many awards for this work including selected as a Stohlman Scholar of the Leukemia and Lymphoma Society USA (2005), Distinguished Scientist of the Canadian Society for Clinical Investigation (2011), CSMB Canadian Science Publishing Senior Investigator Award (2022) and was inducted as a Fellow of the Royal Society of Canada in 2022 and as Fellow of the Canadian Academy of Health Sciences (2024).

Research

Her work provided a series of transformative revelations into the role of dysregulated RNA metabolism in cancer using the eukaryotic translation initiation factor eIF4E as an exemplar. Her studies demonstrated that dysregulation of this factor influenced multiple steps in RNA processing of thousands of RNAs simultaneously thereby reprogramming the cell to become more oncogenic. eIF4E impacts the extent of m7G RNA capping, splicing, export and/or translation of these RNAs based on the presence of cis-acting elements within the RNAs as well as induction of wide scale changes to the production of factors substantially modulated the RNA processing landscape within cells. Her work showed that modulating of many of these factors influence cell survival and cell motility contributing to cancer.

Her studies also led to the finding that a substantial number of Acute Myeloid Leukemia (AML) patients were characterized by elevated eIF4E. This coupled to the discovery that eiF4E could bind to and be inhibited by an antiviral drug ribavirin led to the first clinical trials targeting eIF4E in patients. Indeed, these were also the first studies to target RNA translation or RNA export (and likely related RNA processing events) in humans. Targeting of eIF4E was safe and corresponded to objective clinical responses including remissions in patients. These studies also led to the discovery of a new form of drug resistance in patients, inducible drug glucuronidation. Drug glucuronidation impacts 50% of drugs usually through liver mediated drug deactivation. However, this work revealed that cancer cells could turn on the enzymes involved in this process.

Her lab developed the means to target this inducible drug glucuronidation, with Vismodegib, and showed in patients this reduced levels of glucuronidation enzymes which corresponded to ribavirin activity, targeting of eIF4E and objective clinical responses. However, eventually patients become resistant to the Visomdegib and thus, new modalities are required to overcome this form of drug resistance long term.
