= Ralph Maud =

Ralph Maud (December 24, 1928 – December 8, 2014) was a Canadian literary scholar. He was a professor at English at Simon Fraser University and was regarded as an expert on the work of poets Dylan Thomas and Charles Olson.

== Bibliography ==
Maud served as editor for several anthologies published by Talonbooks in Vancouver, Canada:

- 1978; The Salish People: The Local Contribution of Charles Hill-Tout
- 1982: A Guide to B.C. Indian Myth and Legend ISBN 0889221898
- 1987: The Chilliwacks and Their Neighbors
- 1993: The Porcupine Hunter and Other Stories
- 2000: Transmission Difficulties: Franz Boas and Tsimshian Mythology
- 2004: Poet to Publisher: Charles Olson’s Correspondence with Donald Allen
- 2008: Charles Olson at the Harbor
- 2010: Muthologos: Lectures and Interviews, Revised Second Edition (by Charles Olson) edited by Ralph Maud ISBN 978-0-88922-639-5
- 2014: After Completion: The Later Letters of Charles Olson and Frances Boldereff co-edited with Sharon Thesen ISBN 978-0-88922-706-4

In 1989 J. M. Dent and Company published his edition of notebook poems of Dylan Thomas:

- The Notebook Poems 1930–34

In 1996 Southern Illinois University Press published Maud's work on Charles Olson:

- Charles Olson's Reading: A Biography
