= Borden Lake =

Lake in the state of Minnesota, United States

- Location within Minnesota
- Location: Crow Wing County, Minnesota
- Coordinates: 46°18′18″N 93°51′16″W
- Type: lake

Borden Lake is a lake in Crow Wing County, in the U.S. state of Minnesota.

Borden Lake was named for David S. Borden, an early settler.

== See also ==
- List of lakes in Minnesota
