= Nicholas Borden =

British painter based in Hackney, London

Nicholas Borden is a British painter based in Hackney, London. He studied at Saint Martin's School of Art and then the Royal College of Art.

Nicholas Borden is the brother of photographer Harry Borden and painter Frances Borden.
