= Enid Borden =

American foundation executive

Enid Borden is an American charity founder. She is the president and CEO of the National Foundation to End Senior Hunger (NFESH), formerly known as the Meals On Wheels Research Foundation. As president and CEO, Borden frequently speaks about the issue of food insecurity, and leads NFESH to form new partnerships to help end senior hunger.

== Biography ==
Borden received her bachelor's degree from Alfred University and her master's degree from Adelphi University in New York before studying at the John F. Kennedy School of Government of Harvard University.

Before she joined NFESH, Borden led the Meals On Wheels Association of America (MOWAA) for over 20 years as the president and CEO, growing it from a little-known trade association to become a well known national charity. An outspoken advocate for those forgotten seniors she called "the hidden hungry,” she guided the organization through decades of remarkable growth, increasing its annual budget more than tenfold and overseeing millions of dollars in grants allocated to MOWAA's member programs across the United States to support their efforts of providing nutritious meals to seniors in their local communities.

Prior to her tenure of MOWAA, Borden held several public affairs and policy positions in the public sector, including deputy commissioner for policy and external affairs at the Social Security Administration and director of public affairs of the then-Office of Human Development Services within the U. S. Department of Health and Human Services. She also has been a successful small business owner.

Borden served as an advisory board member of the Sesame Street Food Insecurity Advisory Committee and on the American Society of Association Executive's (ASAE) Key Philanthropic Organizations Committee (KPOC), which she chaired in 2008 and 2009. She has also been a member of the CEO advisory committee of ASAE, a member of the nonprofit advisory board, a member of the board of trustees of Alfred University and the board of directors of the Visiting Nurse Associations of America. Additionally, Borden has served on the faculty in the School of Graduate and Continuing Studies at Goucher College. Borden's work has earned her recognition in Who's Who in the Media and Communications and in the book “Everyday Heroes: 50 Americans Changing the World One Nonprofit at a Time”.
