= Charles Edward Borden =

American-Canadian archaeologist

- Born: 15 May 1905; New York
- Died: December 25, 1978 (aged 73); Vancouver, British Columbia
- Occupation: Professor University of British Columbia
- Known for: Father of archaeology in British Columbia, pre-contact, Borden system
- Spouses: Alice (died 1971); Hala (married 1976)
- Children: John and Keith

Charles Edward Borden; also Carl Borden; (15 May 1905 – 25 December 1978) was an American-born Canadian professor of archaeology at the University of British Columbia and the author of seminal works on archaeology, pre-history and pre-contact history. He was of German descent. The Canadian Archaeological Association referred to him as the grandfather of archaeology in British Columbia and especially regarding prehistory and early history and rendered outstanding services to British Columbia. The Borden System was used on all archaeological sites. Borden deemed the Milliken site in the Fraser Canyon, with finds dating back about 9500 years old, making it the oldest known settlement at the time, therefore the most important of the excavations at sites.

In 1951 Borden received funding from Aluminum Company of Canada (Alcan), and the British Columbia Ministry of Education to undertake salvage archaeology at the Carrier Indian site. The construction of the Kemano power reservoir resulted in imminent flooding of a large part of Carrier hunting territory in Tweedsmuir Park. In 1951 Borden began survey and excavation of the site and returned to work there every summer until he retired in 1970. His final article published in Science in 1979 was based on excavations of early microblade assemblages at Namu in 1977.

From 1948 to 1957, Borden excavated material and undertook salvage archaeology projects in the 1950s and 1960s at the Marpole Midden, also known as Great Marpole Midden. Borden "was the first to draw links between contemporary Musqueam peoples and excavated remains." At the time of his death, however in 1978, in spite of his best intentions, all of the Marpole material was in storage and still required "full description, quantification and publication of the original data" on which they were based.

== Early life ==
Borden left the United States with his mother, when she was widowed taking her infant son to join her family in Germany. In 1927 American authorities helped him to return to the United States.

He majored in German at the University of California at Los Angeles and received his A.B. in 1932. He then studied at University of California at Berkeley earning his M.A. in 1933 and his Ph.D. in 1937. His first teaching position was at Reed College in Portland. He began working as assistant professor of German at the University of British Columbia in after teaching for a short period at Reed College in Portland.

== Legacy ==
- The Early period in Northwest coast prehistory : CAA/SAA symposium organized by Roy L. Carlson in honour of C.E. Borden, Society for American Archaeology und Canadian Archaeological Association 1979.

== See also ==
- Coast Salish peoples
- First Nations
- History of British Columbia
- History of Washington (state)
