= Fred Borden =

American ten-pin bowler

Fred Borden is an American ten-pin bowling coach and player. He has produced numerous bowling training videos in collaboration with Ken Yokobosky, including "Bowling Fun and Fundamentals for Boys and Girls", "Essential Keys To Better Bowling", and "Advanced Bowling Techniques: Tips And Tactics".

Fred Borden has received numerous awards and has been inducted into various halls of fame for his work. He has published 14 books, created numerous instructional videos, and taught bowling in over 50 countries. In 1989 he was named head coach and advisor for Team USA. He began his career by holding classes in a small bowling center in Akron, Ohio, eventually instructing over 400 bowlers at one time.

Borden has also made contributions to the bowling bag industry, as well as conceptualising and implementing the "lunar bowling" concept that most bowling centers now offer under various titles.
