= Charles Borden =

American sailor and writer

Charles A. Borden (1911–1968) was an American sailor and writer. Born in Oakland, he received little formal education and first went to sea at the age of 13. Throughout his life, he sailed extensively throughout the Pacific and South Pacific, earning the trust and acknowledgment of many on the islands which he visited. He circled the globe four times and crossed the Pacific numerous times in his 17-foot boat called Confucius.

Charles decided to settle down with his wife, Rosalie, in 1960 at Spindrift Point near Muir Beach, California. When he died in 1969 he willed the four-acre plot to a conservation group. His masters license is held in the Online Archive of California.

The small house Charles and Rosalie lived in was modeled on the interior of a ship, and constructed by noted architect Henry Hill. Of this special spot, Charles Borden proclaimed "Thoreau has always been my bible, and the Pacific has been my Walden--until I found this place."

== Writing career ==
Borden authored numerous books, many of which detailed his sailing life and focused on skippers he encountered on the seas, both male and female. His books include Oceania, He Sailed with Captain Cook, South Sea Islands, Hawaii: Fiftieth State, and perhaps his most well-known work, Sea Quest: Global Blue-Water Adventuring in Small Craft. Borden also wrote articles for journals and sea-craft related publications.
