= Borden System =

Archaeological numbering system used in Canada

Index map to major Borden Blocks

The Borden System is an archaeological numbering system used throughout Canada and by the Canadian Museum System to track archaeological sites and the artefacts that come from them. Canada is one of a few countries that use a national system to identify archaeological sites.

It was created by Charles Edward Borden in 1952 at the University of British Columbia.

== How it Works ==
The system divides Canada into a grid of blocks based on latitude and longitude. There are two divisions: major and minor blocks.

AaBb-11:1234

A is the Major South-North Locator - Each block represents 2 degrees of Latitude from south to north (A - U)

a is the Minor South-North Locator - Each block represents 10 minutes of Latitude from south to north (a - l)

B is the Major East-West Locator - Each block represents 4 degrees of Longitude from east to west (A - W)

(north of 62 degrees each major block represents 8 degrees of longitude)

b is the Minor East-West Locator - Each block represents 10 minutes of Longitude from east to west (a - x)

(north of 62 degrees each minor block represents 20 minutes of longitude)

Therefore, a full designation: AaBb-16 represents a roughly 16 km x 16 km area and the 16th site found within that area.

Since the number that follows is the number of the site within an area, assigned when the site is discovered, the whole number really only narrows the area to approximately a 16 km square. But it allows archaeologists to designate a site and to label every artefact from the site.

The number after the colon is the artefact number: e.g., AaBb-16:0123

Because the distance between lines of longitude get smaller with increasing latitude, the Borden System changes at 62 degrees north latitude, from a width of 4 degrees of longitude to a width of 8 degrees in order to keep the area within each designate roughly the same.

== Use ==
In Alberta, there are 3,438 minor and 17 major blocks. Of the minor blocks, 44 percent do not have any sites recorded.

Block EgPN covers the west site of Calgary and has 766 sites-the most sites in a block in the country (This is old data - check with local authorities for up to date numbers).

Borden numbers have only been applied to archaeological sites that have been encountered and recorded, and are subject to survey and testing bias, as well as the rates of development in some areas. The actual number of cultural sites is much higher.
