= Burlington Heights (Ontario) =

Promontory and peninsula between Hamilton and Burlington, Ontario, Canada

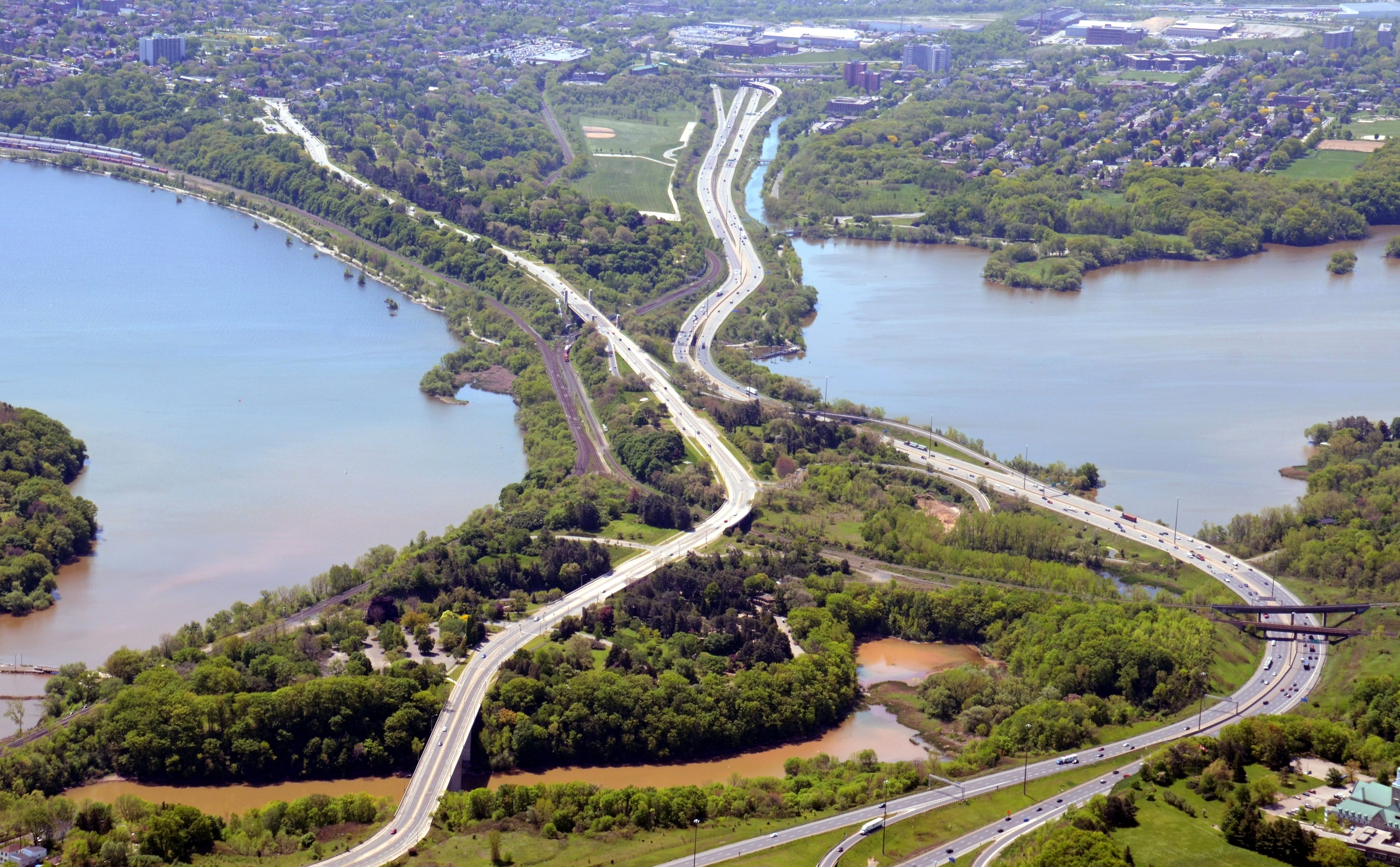
- View of Burlington Heights from Burlington.

- Location within Southern Ontario
- 43°16′14″N 79°53′10″W
- Location: Hamilton, Ontario, Canada

Site notes
- Elevation: 100 metres (330 ft)
- Governing body: City of Hamilton
- Owner: City of Hamilton

National Historic Site of Canada

Burlington Heights refers to a promontory or area of flat land sitting elevated (at about 100 metres (330 ft)) above the west end of Hamilton Harbour in the city of Hamilton, Ontario which continues as a peninsula to the north toward the city of Burlington, Ontario. It separates Cootes Paradise Marsh on the west from the harbor on the east. Geologically Burlington Heights is a sand and gravel bar formed across the eastern end of the Dundas Valley by Glacial Lake Iroquois. It is the northern continuation of the longer Iroquois Bar which extends south into Hamilton.

Burlington Heights is traversed by York Boulevard. In the south, extensive parkland surrounds Dundurn Castle on the east side of the road and the large Hamilton Cemetery on the west side. North of Dundurn Castle a city park is named for Sir John Harvey.

The southern portion of Burlington Heights was designated as a National Historic Site of Canada in 1929, because of its strategic and military importance to the British during the War of 1812. Dundurn Castle was later designated as a National Historic Site in its own right in 1984. Royal Botanical Gardens is another National Historic Site adjacent to the Burlington Heights National Historic Site. Royal Botanical Gardens owns and manages the properties on the Burlington Heights peninsula north of the Desjardins Canal.

== History ==
In the late 18th Century Anishinaabe people used Burlington Heights extensively. These people known as Mississaugas traveled along the northern shore of Lake Ontario throughout the year as various resources became available. The Reverend Peter Jones (Kahkewāquonāby), an Anishinaabe farmer, missionary, and writer, son of Tuhbenahneequay and Loyalist surveyor Augustus Jones, was born on the Burlington Heights in 1802. These people are now known as the Mississaugas of the Credit First Nation.

=== 19th century ===
==== War of 1812 ====
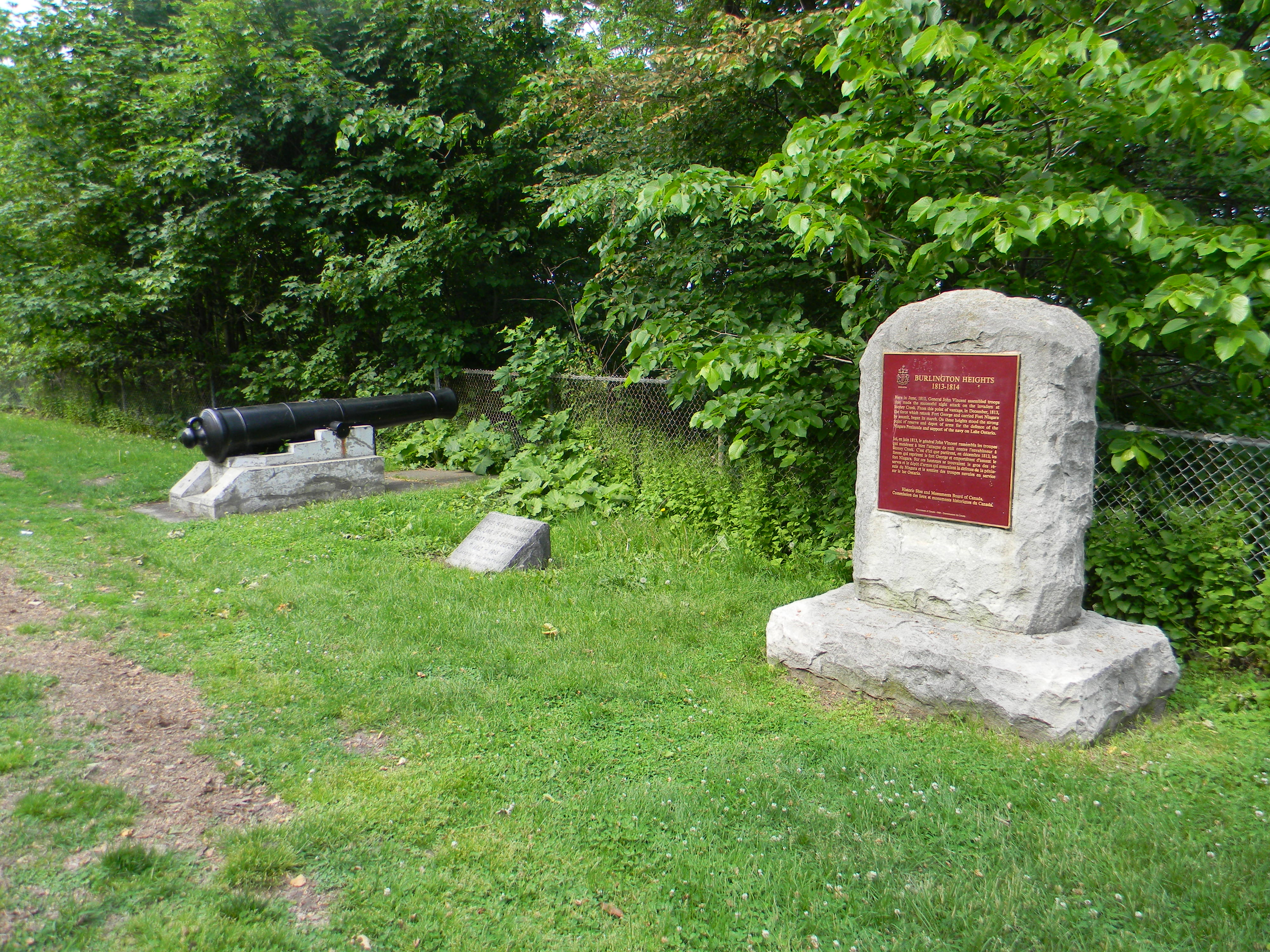
Stone markers and cannon. The centre stone marks the first line of earthwork defences erected at the Heights' during the War of 1812.

The "Heights" were the location of a British Army post during the War of 1812. The British army post was established on the commandeered property of Richard Beasley in May 1813. Batteries (on the north and south ends), a magazine, Sally port and earthworks were built to create a line of defence. Troops with the 8th (The King's) and 49th (Princess Charlotte of Wales's) (Hertfordshire) Regiments of Foot were stationed at the Heights after being forced to retreat from American troops advancing into the Niagara Peninsula in May 1813. From Beasley's Establishment the British forces, under the command of General John Vincent and Sir John Harvey launched a successful attack on a much larger American force early on the morning of 6 June 1813, at Stoney Creek.

On 29 July 1813, an American naval squadron arrived near the Burlington Heights in an attempt to dislodge the British forces from the promontory, and to relieve the British-Native blockade of Fort George. Approximately 500 American soldiers disembarked at Burlington Beach under the command of Colonel Winfield Scott, but he found the defenders too well-entrenched in the heights for any assault to be successful. As a result, the American force withdrew from the area, opting instead to raid the settlement of York.

Because of the Heights' importance to the British Army during the War of 1812, the southern portion of the promontory was designated a National Historic Site of Canada in 1929.

==== Post-War of 1812 ====
After the War of 1812, former British barracks on the northern part of the peninsula were used as a hospital for immigrants with contagious diseases, most notably during an outbreak of cholera between 1832 and 1833. In 1832 Beasley sold his property on the Heights to Sir Allan Napier MacNab, who built the 40-room Dundurn Castle on the site of Beasley's house.

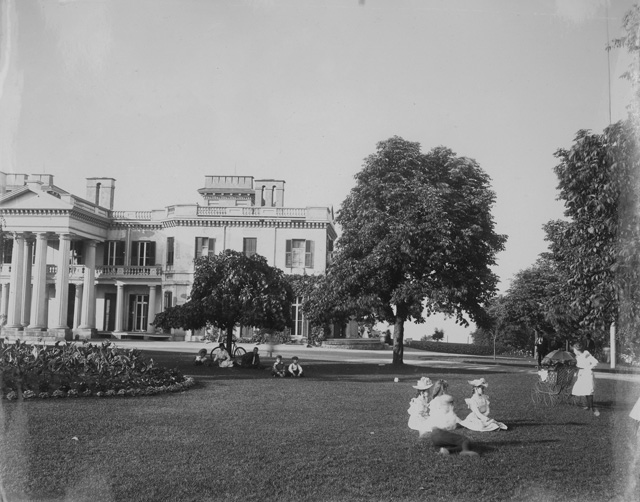
Dundurn Castle, c. 1890s. The building was erected in the 1830s at the southern end of the promontory.

Before 1852, the Heights separated Cootes Paradise Marsh from Hamilton Harbour. That year the Desjardins Canal, which had opened in 1836 and which allowed shipping to reach Dundas from Hamilton Harbour, was straightened by an excavation through the Burlington Heights.

On March 12, 1857, the Desjardins Canal disaster occurred when the Great Western Railway bridge over the Desjardins Canal collapsed as a result of a derailment caused by a faulty axle on a locomotive, killing 59 people. This remains Canada's second-worst railway accident in terms of deaths.

=== 20th century ===
In 1926 the City of Hamilton purchased most of the Burlington Heights north of the Desjardins Canal for a civic beautification program and construction of a new bridge over the canal. The program was carried out as the "Northwestern Entrance to the City of Hamilton" between 1927 and 1932. The resulting gardens were incorporated into the Royal Botanical Gardens in 1932.

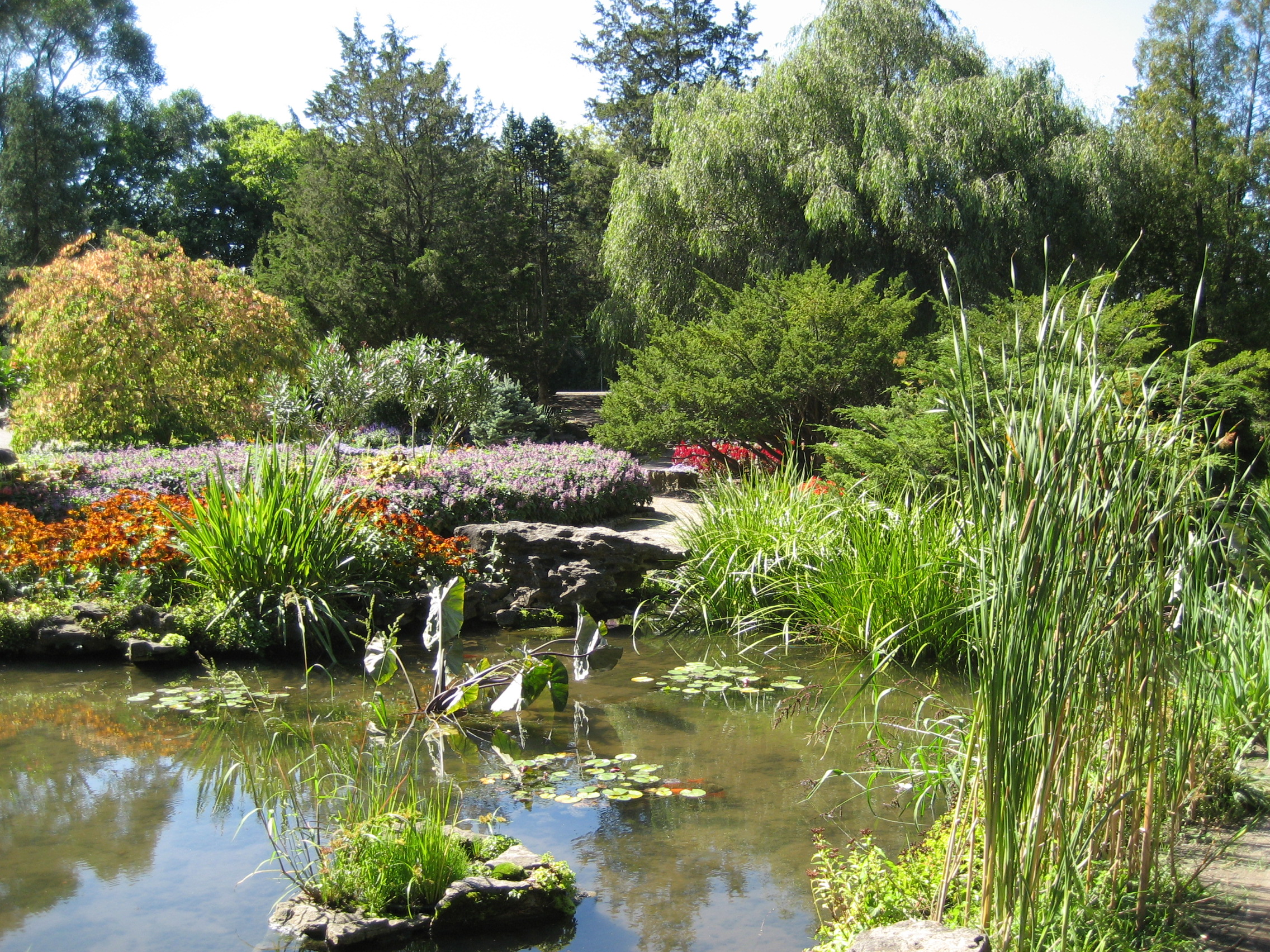
The Rock Garden at Royal Botanical Gardens lies at the north end of the Burlington Heights

The southern portion of the Burlington Heights was designated as a National Historic Site of Canada in 1929, because of its strategic and military importance to the British during the War of 1812. Other properties on the Heights were also designated as a National Historic Site, including Dundurn Castle in 1984 because of its architectural significance and the remarkable degree to which the overall "picturesque" estate remains intact. The northern portion of the Burlington Heights was designated as part of the Royal Botanical Gardens National Historic Site of Canada in 1993, as it includes significant gardens originating in the 1930s City Beautiful Movement and the work of Thomas Baker McQuesten.

== In popular culture ==
The novel The Fishers of Paradise by Rachael Preston is set in 1930 among members of the boathouse community that once lived along the shores of Cootes Paradise Marsh and the Burlington Heights.

== See also ==
- Queenston Heights
