= Maungwudaus =

Ojibwe performer, interpreter, mission worker, and herbalist

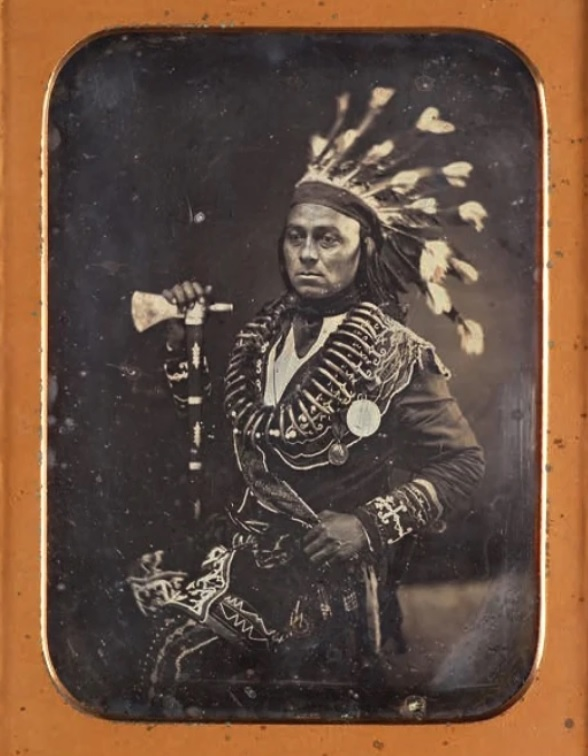
Daguerreotype of Maungwudaus, c.1846

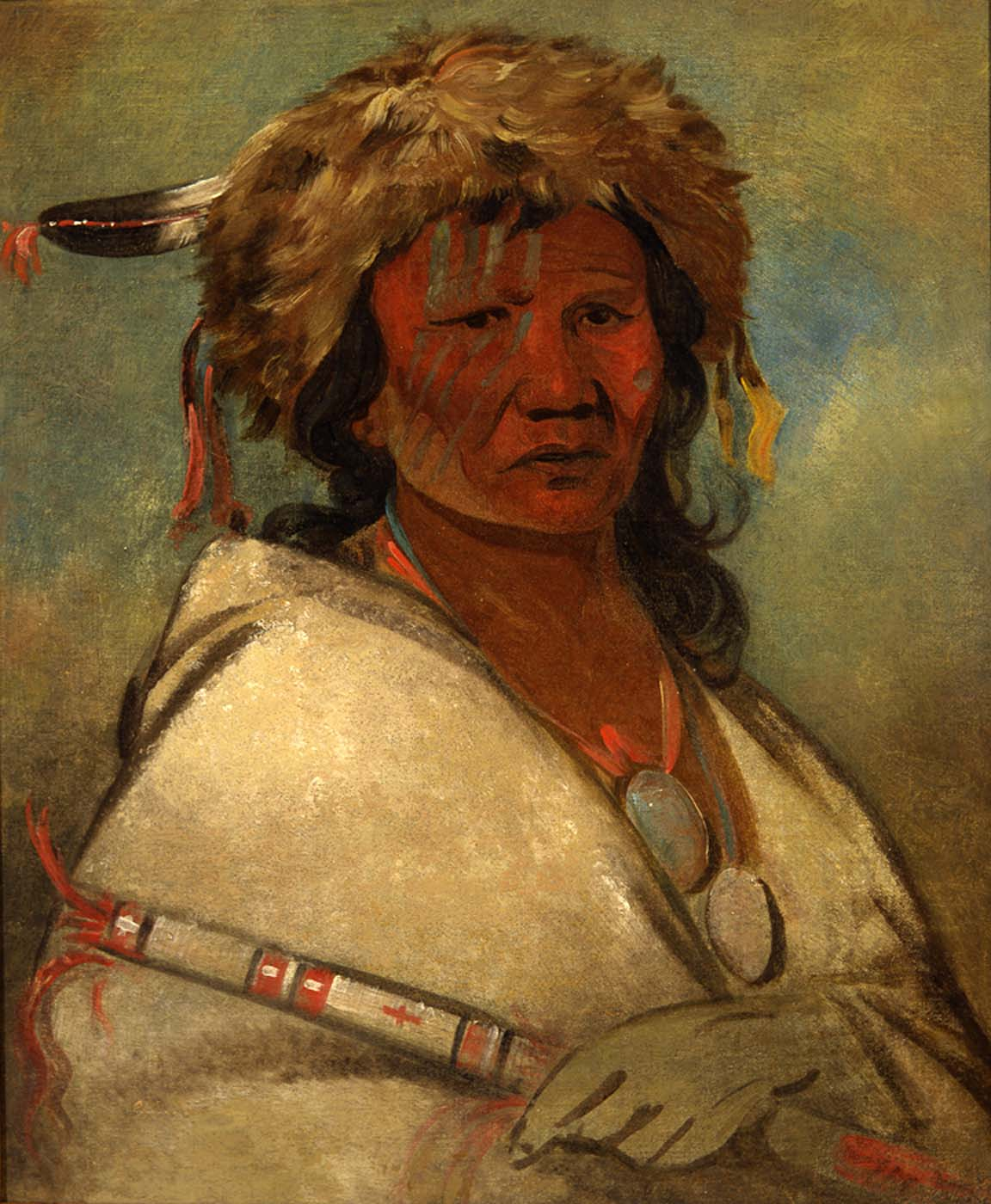
"Great Hero, a chief" by George Catlin, 1845, Smithsonian American Art Museum

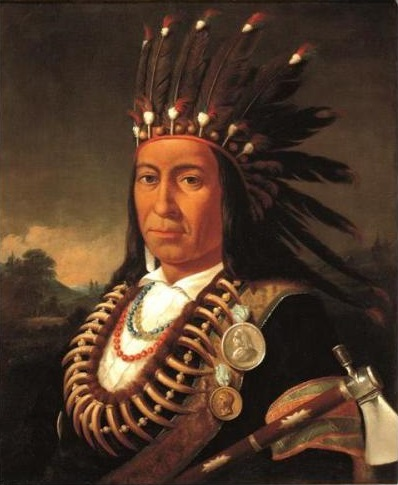
Portrait of Maungwudaus by Paul Kane, 1851, Tacoma Art Museum

George Henry (1811–1888), later Maungwudaus, was an Ojibwe performer, interpreter, mission worker, and herbalist. He interpreted the Ojibwe language into English. He was a herbalist towards the end of his life.

== Early life ==
Maungwudaus was born in 1811 along Forty Mile Creek in Ontario, Canada. His father was Chief Mesquacosy, who was a War of 1812 veteran, and his mother Tuhbenahneequay, or Sarah Henry, was Chief Wahbanosay's daughter. His half-brother was missionary Peter Jones on the maternal side. He spent his childhood in the territory of the Credit Mississauga. As a child, Maungwudaus learned about the medicinal properties of plants. Maungwudaus was raised to worship the Great Spirit and to sacrifice animals to him.

Around 1824, Maungwudaus became a Methodist after being converted by ministers and he attended a Credit River mission school. Maungwudaus learned English at the mission school which gave him more opportunities. Due to how well he did as a student, New York City's John Street Methodist Church paid for him to attend the mission school from 1830 to 1831. His wife, Hannah, had their second son, Abraham, in May 1831. The church provided him more money for his schooling in 1832. He later taught Sunday school. After a missionary trip in 1832 with his family, they moved to Muncey, southwest of London, Ontario.

== Career ==
He served at multiple missions and he was a teacher at Muncey during the winter of 1835 which was to the north of Brantford, Ontario. He also taught in Sarnia, Ontario. In 1837, Maungwudaus was elected to be the third chief of the Credit River Band. He moved to Walpole Island during the 1830s and was a preacher. In 1840, Maungwudaus was a government interpreter at the Saint Clair Mission. He helped James Evans translate Methodist hymns into Ojibwe and was later recommended to be an assistant missionary by a Methodist church committee. Also in 1840, his withdrawal from the Canadian Methodist Conference began with the reaction of his half-brother Peter Jones to his translations of Methodist hymns. Despite his withdrawal, Maungwudaus became a government interpreter. During this time, he kept his role as a Methodist interpreter and translator although he did not have enthusiasm for the job. During the late 1830s, he decided to go by his Ojibwe name Maungwudaus and relinquished his prior religion for Ojibwe culture. He later favoured the Church of England. In July 1844, he became an interpreter on Walpole Island for a short period of time.

Maungwudaus organized a dance troupe, which included his family and some non-Christian Ojibwe from Walpole Island, during the summer of 1844 to tour across England. After deciding to go by the name Maungwudaus instead of George Henry, his troupe was entertained by noted people and he joined the Roman Catholic Church. From 1845 to 1848, his troupe traveled throughout Europe to put on dances and exhibitions. They later traveled throughout Canada and the United States. During their time in the United States, Hannah and three of their children died from smallpox. During the spring of 1851, Maungwudaus gave up on Roman Catholicism. His dance troupe continued traveling and in 1852, he married Taundoqua after meeting her in Michigan in 1851. In 1854, he moved to the Grand River Reserve and wrote a pamphlet about his experiences in Europe.

== Later life and legacy ==
In the late 1850s, Maungwudaus decided to become a herbalist and he called himself Dr. Maungwudaus. He knew how to cure common ailments with herbs and they hung from his ceiling with a strong aroma. During the mid-1860s, Maungwudaus received long testimonials from clients. The last known newspaper record of Maungwudaus is from 1877 when he was building a canoe for a 4 July boat race in Carthage, New York. After participating in the race, there were no other records of Maungwudaus. It was written that he died in 1888.

In 2002, an 1851 painting of Maungwudaus by Paul Kane sold for $2.2 million in Calgary which placed it as the "second-most valuable artwork" in Canada. Portraits of Maungwudaus were also done by George Catlin and Théodore Gudin.
