= Nahnebahwequa =

Nahnebahwequa (Naaniibawikwe in the Fiero spelling, meaning "Standing-Upright Woman") or Catherine Bunch was an Ojibwa spokeswoman and Christian Missionary.

== Early life ==
Born in the early fall of 1824 at the Credit River, now called Port Credit, Ontario, Nah ne bah wee qua was the daughter of Bunch Sunego and Mary Polly Crane. Her paternal grandfather was Osunego (Asanagoo, "Black squirrel"), a Mississauga Tribal Chief from the Eagle doodem, and her maternal grandfather was (Otesoo), a War Chief from the Otter Clan who fought for the British Crown in the American Revolutionary War. She was baptized Catherine Bunch by Rev. Thomas Madden in 1825, but later took the name Catherine Brown, after a revered Christian Cherokee convert. Catherine was unofficially adopted by her uncle, Rev. Peter Jones and his English wife, Eliza Field with whom she lived at the Credit Mission from about 1837 until her marriage in 1839.

== Visit to England ==
Aunt Eliza Jones took Catherine to England in 1837 where she furthered her education while Peter, known as Kahkewaquonaby (Sacred Feathers), a Chief of the Credit Band, delivered a Petition and Wampum Belt to Queen Victoria. The petition expressed the desire of the Mississauga Band to acquire titled deeds and ownership to their lands, as they felt that this was the only way to prevent the encroachment of European settlers at the Credit River.

== Negotiations with Bond Head and Arthur ==
In Upper Canada, Lieutenant Governor Francis Bond Head had developed a scheme to put all the natives living in Southern Ontario on Manitoulin Island. However, the Mississaugas knew Manitoulin Island was not fit for farming as it was mostly rock with animals, fruits and grasses being scarce due to lack of fertile soil and viewed the scheme as yet another violation of their rights.

The Mississaugas had cleared and built a thriving community at the Credit Mission as they had been promised retention of the land for future generations. In response to Bond Head's scheme, the Mississauga Band decided to send Catherine's uncle, Rev. Peter Jones, who was also the Chief of the Mississaugas to Great Britain to present their grievances to Queen Victoria. The Colonial Secretary, Lord Glenelg, sympathetic to the Canadian Native people's plight, recommended to Her Majesty the Queen, that the Credit River Mississaugas should be granted title deeds.

Meanwhile, having been ill-equipped to deal with European settlers, Lieutenant Governor Bond Head had resigned. His successor George Arthur, however, was no better and in 1840, he told the Native people that he was not in favor of them receiving deeds "for fear they would sell them".

On top of this, S.P. Jarvis, who was Chief Superintendent of Indian Affairs since 1837 was dismissed in disgrace in 1845 after an investigation by the Bagot commission found him guilty of misappropriating the Mississauga's funds. Shortly after, the Saugeen and Nawash Band invited the Mississaugas to settle on the Bruce Peninsula.

Oral history of the Saugeen people serves to remind people that Saugeen Territory never included a "Nawash Band." The traditional territory of the Saugeen people covered most of Southern Ontario, from around what is now known as Orangeville to Tobermory and to Grand Bend/Goderich.

Some people were relocated to Cape Croker from the Owen Sound area around 1860.

According to oral history, Saugeen allowed people to settle in the part of their traditional territory at Cape Croker. Also, descendants of Peter Jones are still alive at Saugeen. Peter Jones converted Chief Kegedonce of the Sable River and he took his Christian name to become Peter Kegedonce Jones. Descendants of Kegedonce Jones still live at Nawash, formerly Cape Croker. But Sable River no longer exists as an Aboriginal community.

== Family life and missionary work ==
On January 9, 1839, Catherine's adopted father and uncle, Rev. Peter Jones performed the marriage of Catherine to William Sutton at the Credit Mission. William and Catherine Sutton continued to live at the Credit Mission with their three children, Catherine Brown Sutton, Joseph Sunego Sutton and Sophia Anne Sutton. They were all members of the tribe until 1845 when they accepted the invitation of the Nawash Tribe and traveled north to Georgian Bay. After their adoption into the Nawash Band, they were given 200 acres (0.81 km^{2}) of land by the tribe, now known as, Lot 34 and Lot 35, Concession 3, Sarawak on the beautiful shore of Georgian Bay. Catherine and William cleared 35 acres (140,000 m^{2}) of the 200 acres (0.81 km^{2}) and built a house, barn, and enclosed garden on lot 34.

Oral history of the Saugeen notes that the Owen Sound area was part of their traditional territory. In fact, a footpath from Saugeen to Owen Sound later became a highway. It was not until the late 1980s that Cape Croker changed its name to Nawash. Cape Croker was also part of Saugeen Territory. Those who chose to move to Cape Croker after being forced out of Owen Sound around 1858 were mainly from the United States, from the Coldwater area or displaced from their homelands.

Also, according to Saugeen oral history, land was cared for and used by the entire membership. The Creator provided for all Ojibway and land ownership by individuals was not believed possible.

The people of Saugeen never agreed to give away individual parcels or lots to non-natives such as William Sutton.

[The Nawash didn't give land to Englishman William Sutton either. They gave it to Catherine Brown Sutton who was William Sutton's wife and daughter of Bunch Sonego ] Source Nov 7th 1845 gift of Two Hundred Acres to Catherine Sutton and her heirs (RG 10 Volume 2877, File 177,181)

The letter reads:

Nawash Owen Sound November 7 th 1845

We the undersigned Chiefs agree to give Catherine Sutton the daughter of Bunch Sunego the native of the River Credit the Chippewa Tribe, and her lawfull Heirs, a parcel of land containing Two Hundred Acres situated near the bay about seven or eight miles (13 km) below the Indian Village, which situated will be known from a clearing that is now commenced on it. This beginning is made to Catherine Sutton the daughter of the late Bunch Sunego and her lawfull Heirs who are native of the River Credit the Chippewa Tribe. Held Council at Nawash Owen Sound of the eighteenth day of Oct 1845.

signed Thomas Wabatick Peter Sachoo David Sawyer

fully explained in our presence

Unfortunately, 1851 was a hard winter and as well as losing their first child to be born in Sarawak, a son named after William, Catherine also became ill and nearly died. The soil was hard to work and the Suttons, not used to such an isolated area, wanted to leave Sarawak. They had been used to living in a large native community at the Credit, with lots of support, doctors, churches and schools where children could be educated. Although they planned to return when their son Joseph would be old enough to help with the farming, William also felt they should be compensated for the improvements he had made to their land if there ever was a surrender.

In 1852 William was asked to superintend a model farm for the Wesleyan Methodist Church's Mission in Garden River, near Sault Ste. Marie so they gathered their family and went farther north to teach the Grace of God and farming to the Native community there. They stayed until around 1855 when they moved to Michigan spending two years working at the Ojibwa Methodist Missions before finally returning to their farm at Sarawak in 1857.

== Conflict with Indian Affairs ==
On returning, they found that a Surrender had taken place and their gift of land had been included and divided up into lots for sale at a public auction, taking away the land that had been given to Catherine and her lawful heirs, her children.

Catherine and William approached R.T. Pennefather, Superintendent of Indian Affairs, asking for Catherine's share of the annuities that she should have received between 1852 and 1857. They also felt that they should receive recompense for the monies they had spent on their house, barn and stable, which had also been surrendered in their absence.

The Government had promised the Nawash Band that they would be able to have the lots they bid on at the Land Sale for half the upset price per acre so Catherine went to the sale along with the European settlers. She bid and paid the first installments for lots 34, 35 and 36, for William and herself, for lot 31 for their son Joseph. Lot 32 and lot 33 for her mother Mary, (who had been living and farming on these lots since her move from the Credit with her new husband Joseph KaKaKe) and lot 37 for her sister Mary Sunego meant that Catherine paid for land totalling almost 600 acres (2.4 km^{2}). This purchase was made despite the fact that Catherine and her family had already been given lots 34 and 35 as a gift, land that she considered was already hers due to the promises made to her forefathers in many speeches and council meetings due to their loyalty to the British Crown in many wars.

At this same sale, David Sawyer, a cousin of Catherine's, and Abner Elliot, also made first installments on the land they had been given by the Nawash. They had cleared their land, built homes and barns and had been farming since their arrival from the Credit River having also been adopted by the Nawash tribe from the Credit Band of Mississauga's.

After successfully bidding and paying her money, Catherine was given a Certificate of Sale by the Land Agent and she in turn passed it to her Methodist minister, Conrad Vandusen, who had offered to have the lots registered. However, he was intercepted by the Indian Affair's Representative, Bartlett, who asked Vandusen to see the Certificates of Sale. He handed Catherine's documents to Bartlett who stole the Certificates and the money, informing Vandusen that Indians were not allowed to buy land. It was at this point that Catherine and William approached Richard T. Pennefather, Superintendent of Indian Affairs, for her annuities and for the money spent on the house, barn and improvements on their land as other native people had received their Annuities and compensation for their land improvements. These annuities only amounted to $10.00 semiannually because of the dishonest handling of the funds.

The money collected from the sale of Indian Lands were intended to go directly for the good of the Nawash Band but was instead held in Trust by the Government preventing the Native people from accessing it. The Government also promised to provide roads, schools and houses in return for this Surrender.

Indian Affairs for rejected Catherine's purchase citing that she was not eligible to the land because she was married to a white man. Catherine knew there was no such law. Indian Affairs also argued her ineligibility due to the fact she was absent from the country at the time of the Surrender although this was also incorrect as she was still considered a Native person by the Nawash Band.

Catherine went to Toronto many times and petitioned Provincial Parliament along with David Sawyer and Abner Elliot in 1858. The Nawash Band also petitioned on Catherine's behalf in 1858 but this petition also failed.

In 1859, she was finally approached by Bartlett and Pennefather and was informed that she would be able to buy her land after all, if she followed the conditions of sale, including the condition that she re-pay the first installments for each lot, which she refused to do. Another condition of purchase was to give up her annuities and thus give up her birthright of being Indian. so again she refused. Her remarks made in 1861 were "I am Indian; and the blood of my forefathers runs through my veins and I am not ashamed to own it; for my forefathers were a noble race before the pale-faces came to possess their lands and homes”. She refused to dishonor her ancestors and leave her children without a home.

Abner Elliot and David Sawyer, also petitioned the Government, but were not given this same right to purchase their land. This unfortunately caused bad feelings towards the Suttons.

== England ==
In July 1859 at a general Council meeting in Rama, Catherine was appointed to go to England on the Nawash Band's behalf just as her Uncle Peter Jones had done 22 years before her. In order to raise funds for this mission, Catherine, who was expecting a child, left her home, her children and her husband. She was carrying letters of introduction from local ministers and Justices of the Peace in Owen Sound that showed her moral character 45. Off to New York she went on a speaking tour to promote Native Rights. She was well received by the public. She was interviewed and written up in many newspaper articles throughout New York State. As a result, she was able to raise enough money, and with the support of the Quakers and The Aborigine Protection Society, she was soon on her way to England aboard the steamship, Persia, armed with prestigious letters of introduction.

In England, she met Member of Parliament, John Bright, who was a Quaker. He introduced her to Robert and Christena Alsop who were also Quakers and members of the Aborigine Protection Society. Catherine was their guest while in England. On June 19, 1860, she was presented to Queen Victoria.

On June 29, 1860, Catherine wrote a letter to the son of her Uncle Rev Peter Jones, C A Jones that was reprinted in a Brantford newspaper on August 3. It reads:

My dear Uncle and Grandfather I have just returned from the palace. I saw General Bruce and had a long talk with him on Indian affairs. I have done all that can be done in this Country. In the first place I was at the Aboriginal Protection Society and spoke in that meeting for my people; and from that time men of influence came to offer themselves if they could do anything for me .I was introduced to Mr. John Bright and he said he would do what he could; and he went to see the Duke of New Castle the Queen's Prime Minister who appointed a time to see me. Mr. John Bright went with me, also a Quaker and his wife (Mr. John Bright is a Quaker too.) The Duke was very kind and asked me many questions about the Indians, which I answered as well as I could. So at the close of our conversation he promised me he would let me know when I would see the Queen; so in a few days the letter came to my friend, at whose house I was stopping. “

The letter (dated June 28, 1860) Mrs. Christine R. Alsop received from the Duke of New Castle, confirming a date and time for Catherine's appointment was also reprinted in this Brantford newspaper. It reads:

Madam, The Queen commands me to say that she will receive Nah-nee-bah-wee-qua y at Buckingham Palace tomorrow (Tuesday) at a quarter before 3 o’clock Her Majesty will be very glad if you are able to accompany her.

I am yours faithfully,

Newcastle.

The letter to her Uncle and Grandfather goes on to say:

So you see I have seen the Queen. The Duke went before us and he made two bows, and then I was left in the presence of the Queen; she came forward to meet me, and held out her hand for me to kiss, but I forgot to kiss it, and only shook hands with her. The Queen asked me many question, and was very kind in her manners and very friendly to me. Then my Quaker friend spoke to the Duke, and said “I suppose the Queen knows for what purpose my friend has come?. The Duke said, “All my papers had been explained and laid before her majesty, and I have her majesty's commands to investigate the Indian affair when I go to Canada with the Prince of Wales.” Then the Queen bowed to me and said“ I am happy to promise my aid and protection, and asked me my name. The Queen then looked at her husband, who stood at her left side, and smiled. She received me with so much kindness as to astonish me, when I saw her come smiling and so good to poor Indian. My Quaker friend has been in the habit of visiting the Royal family for ten years back. I expect to return home in Sept., If all be well .May God bless us all.

The Queen promised to look into her concerns and requested the Duke of New Castle to investigate matters during his up-and-coming trip to Canada.

It became very evident, that Indian Affairs wanted Catherine to be silent. A letter written by Bartlett to Jones of Cape Croker says, “Discourage Mrs. Sutton's actions of choosing others in which she could place confidence to speak to New Castle; you must tell Indians not to listen to her." The affairs of the Indian Department had been handled by Britain, but on July 1, 1860, Britain handed over the responsibility to the new Provincial Parliament of Canada, the very people who had everything to gain by not looking into the problem.

== Manitoulin Treaty ==
Catherine and William were devastated. By 1861 the Indian Department began negotiating the Manitoulin Treaty for white settlers. Manitoulin Island had been promised in 1836 to remain forever in the hands of the Native people. Catherine again stood up for Native Rights and opposed very strongly this purchase. Charles Lindsey, who was the editor of the Toronto Leader, wrote an unfavorable racist article in his newspaper. Catherine responded with her own very powerful letter that criticized Lindsey and the government for their attempt to purchase Manitoulin Island for white settlers. She had seen this happen repeatedly with the Mississauga, Saugeen and Nawash.

By 1861 William, not Catherine, agreed to the conditions of sale, but he was still negotiating a reduction in price for his lots until 1871. He felt he should get the reduction that had been previously offered to his wife and his neighbors of $3.00 an acre. Catherine died on Sept 26th 1865 before these negotiations were finalized. In the end he paid $5.00 an acre. Finally, he received the deeds for Lots 32 and 33. By then he was living on Lot 33, along with Catherine's mother Mary KaKaKe and her children, Martha and Moses, whom he'd been taking care of since Mary's husband disappeared. He was also supporting his own younger children and his grandchildren by his daughter, Sophia Staves, who had died in 1875. William Sutton had a lot on his plate financially.

== Burial ==
Catherine was buried in her garden on Lot 34. Catherine and William's neighbor Charles Julyan recorded going to Nahnebahwequa's funeral, where at her own request, she was buried in her garden. This is substantiated in Julyan's letter to Joseph Howe in 1871. Catherine made sure she was buried on the very lot for which she had been trying to get a deed. This certainly was one way they could not remove her. One way or another she was staying.

Catherine was laid to rest
On the land she loved
In the bosom of Mother Earth
She found comfort within her

She has become the earth.
The spring rain falls to her
And rises, to become clouds to rain again like tears.
She is in the whisper of the wind in the trees

The birds ring out her sorrow
In cries of needed justice for her people
The song they sing is for her children to have a home
Catherine has a home in heaven now
No earthly hands can sell.
