= Augustus Jones =

Upper Canadian Surveyor

- Born: c. 1757; Hudson River Valley (and likely in Dutchess County), New York
- Died: November 16, 1836; Near Paris, Ontario
- Occupations: Surveyor, Farmer
- Known for: Deputy Surveyor General for the Nassau District (Home District) of Upper Canada, 1789 - 1799
- Spouse(s): Sarah Tekarihogen (Methodist ceremony); Tuhbenahneequay (Ojibwa ceremony)
- Children: John; Peter; Catherine; Rachel; Mary; Henry; Joseph; Sally; Lucretia; Augustus Jr.

Augustus Jones (c. 1757 – November 16, 1836) was a North American-born Upper Canadian farmer, land speculator, magistrate, militia captain and surveyor. Jones trained as a surveyor in New York City, and fled as a United Empire Loyalist to Upper Canada. In Upper Canada, he worked as a crown surveyor in the Nassau District, where he quickly rose to the position of Deputy Surveyor General, the highest position in a district of Upper Canada. He occupied that position from 1789 informally, and 1791 formally, until his retirement in 1799. During that time he laid down many of the township boundaries in the Niagara Peninsula and on the north shore of Lake Ontario. He led various teams that cut many of the first sideroads and concession roads into these areas, facilitating their settlement by European and American immigrants. Jones also surveyed the routes for Dundas Street and Yonge Street, and supervised their construction. After his retirement, Jones farmed first in Saltfleet Township, later moving to Brantford and finally an estate outside Paris named Cold Springs, where he died in 1836.

== Youth ==
Augustus Jones was born to Ebenezer Jones, a Welsh immigrant, around 1757, likely in Dutchess County of the Province of New York. In his youth, he trained as a land surveyor in New York City. Jones worked for some years across New York, and his name appears in paperwork for land transfers in Newburgh, New York, in 1783 and 1784.

== Flight from the United States ==
Jones and his family remained loyal to the British Crown, and sometime in the 1780s, Jones; his father, Ebenezer; his brother, Stephen, and Stephen's family; and his sisters, Mary and Susannah, fled the United States. Jones proceeded ahead and obtained 300 acres (1.2 km^{2}) of land in Saltfleet Township, part of which would later become the site of the Battle of Stoney Creek.

== Crown surveyor ==
Jones met Major Archibald Campbell, the commanding officer of Fort Niagara on June 9, 1787. He presented the Major with a letter of recommendation from Cadwallader Colden Junior, which attested to Jones' good character and surveying capability. Two days later, Jones was hired as a land surveyor for the Crown. Jones' first assignments were working as a chain bearer for various teams surveying the Niagara region.

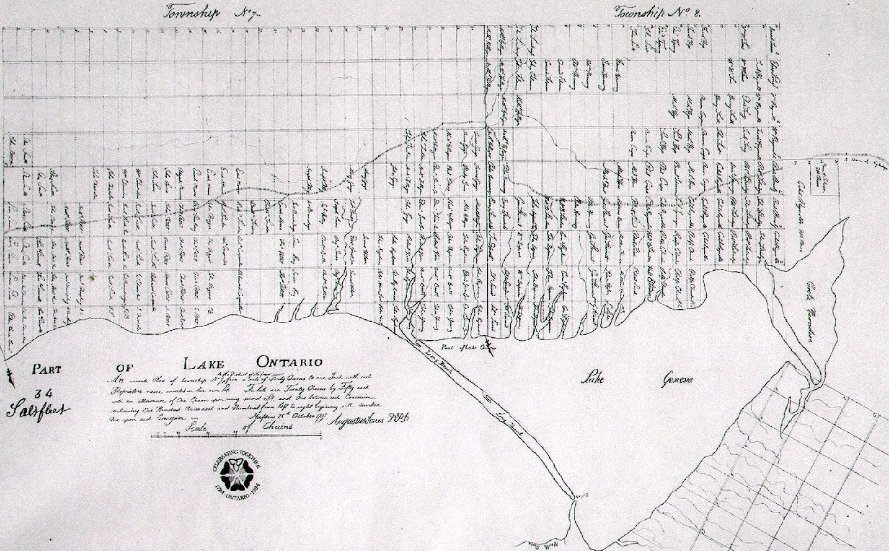
Jones' surveying map of Saltfleet township.

After a short while, Jones was given command of his own surveying team. His first assignment was the surveying of Stamford Township, a task they began on November 5, 1787, and completed on January 8, 1788. That January, Jones was appointed to the position of assistant to Philip Frey, the deputy surveyor of the Nassau District. From January 15 to March 12, Jones surveyed Barton Township. From April 1 to 24, Jones surveyed Clinton Township. From May 1 to July 28, Jones led the survey of Bertie Township. From July 24 to August 24, Jones's team surveyed Saltfleet Township. From August 24 to October 25, the team surveyed Thorold Township. In Thorold, Jones was receiving a pay of four shillings a day, and his two primary assistants, Joseph Jones and Benjamin Stanton, received the same. All worked the full 54 days of the survey. Local men were hired as woodcutters and chainbearers for shorter periods, and typically earned two shillings a day.

On October 25, 1788, Jones's team began their survey of Grimsby Township; it was completed November 13, 1788. Saltfleet Township was surveyed from November 14, 1788, to December 25, 1788, and Binbrook Township was surveyed from December 24, 1788, until February 12, 1789. All of these townships were surveyed using the Front and Rear system, except Binbrook, which was surveyed with the Single Front system. During this time, Frey had assigned two other surveyors to lead surveys in the Nassau district. Daniel Hazen and Jesse Pawling both led teams, but neither group was as busy as Jones' group. Hazen's group surveyed only four townships, and incompletely, and Pawling's three, also incompletely. In November 1789 Jones began acting as the deputy surveyor in Nassau District as Frey had left Upper Canada, and he officially received the position in early 1791 on the order of Deputy Surveyor General John Collins.

== Deputy surveyor for Nassau District ==
In 1791 and 1792, Jones surveyed the lakeshore of townships east from York, Upper Canada, to the Trent River, from the lakeshore to a distance of one mile (1.6 km) from Lake Ontario. Jones and his team had set out from Scarborough to the eastern boundary of the Nassau District, the approximate area of the mouth of the Trent River. From there, they began surveying townships along Lake Ontario travelling westwards. They surveyed in turn Murray Township, then Cramahe Township, Haldimand Township, Hamilton Township, Hope Township, Clarke Township, Darlington Township, Pickering Township, Glasgow Township, York Township and Etobicoke Township. Sideroads were then run north to the first concession road. Clarke township had previously been unnamed, Jones was the one to name it. The survey of the west end of the Nassau district finalised the boundary of the Toronto Purchase, which had been agreed upon in principle, but could not be completed because the land areas involved were not well known. On June 13, 1792, Jones submitted a town plan for Newark, Upper Canada to the Land Board.

Around this time, Jones began to acquire significant tracts of land across southern Ontario. He obtained large sections of land in Saltfleet Township and Barton Township with various petitions and grants, and small lots in Newark and York. From Mohawk chief Joseph Brant, he received leases on ten square miles of land in return for his surveys of land along the Grand River.

In 1792, he was retained by Lieutenant Governor John Graves Simcoe to survey a straight line from Burlington Bay, Ontario, to the Thames River; it would run along the eastern boundary of land purchased from the Mississauga First Nation by the Crown in a Treaty of Purchase from 22 May 1784. The work started at a property owned by Richard Beasley (politician) on September 16, 1792. Jones' report made some errors in the names of rivers but his group eventually reached the Conestoga River near the village of Arthur, Ontario. He mistakenly believed that they had arrived at the Thames River and Jones terminated the survey. The line he had surveyed became known as The Jones Baseline.

For a 1793, project, Simcoe employed the Queen's Rangers led by Captain Samuel Smith; this survey would be for the construction of a road from Hamilton to Woodstock; it would eventually become Dundas Street. The same year, he surveyed Flamborough Township, Beverley Township, Ancaster Township and York Township. Jones spent 1794 surveying Flamborough, Glanford, Binbrook, Delaware, Oxford, Dorchester, Burford, Grimsby and Windham.

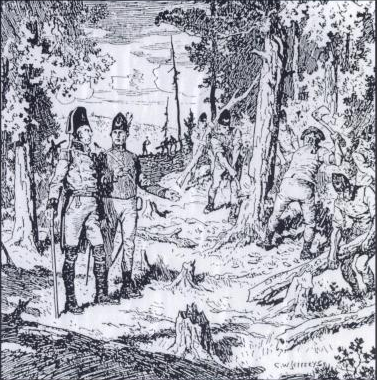
Drawing of Jones and John Graves Simcoe conferring during the construction of Yonge Street, by Charles Williams Jeffreys.

In 1795, Jones surveyed Ancaster, Thorold, Grantham, Beverley, Southwold, Whitby, York, Scarboro, Pickering, the lands of Joseph Brant and Lake Simcoe. On December 24, 1795, Jones was directed by Lieutenant Governor John Graves Simcoe to survey and open a cart road from the newly planned settlement of York, Upper Canada to Lake Simcoe. Jones began the planning work the next day. On the 29th of that December, Jones was given the assistance of thirty of the Queen's Rangers for the road's construction. The work began January 4, 1796, on this road, which would become Yonge Street. Jones worked as the effective master builder in addition to his title as surveyor. The road reached Holland Landing on February 16, 1796, and Jones returned to York on February 20 to inform the Lieutenant Governor that the road was completed. This first incarnation of Yonge Street measured some 34 miles and 53 chains. For the rest of 1796, Jones spent his time surveying Newark, Flamborough, Grimsby, Saltfleet, Beverley, York and Coot's Paradise.

Working as the Deputy Surveyor, Jones began to build good relations with the Mississauga Ojibwa Indians and Mohawk Indians of the area. He became fluent in the languages of these groups and earned the trust of many members of the tribes, including influential members like Joseph Brant, of whom he became a good friend. In 1797 the head chief of the Mississaugas in the Credit River area Wabakinine, as well as his wife, were murdered by a member of the Queen's Rangers. Wabakinine had been a very beloved chief and seen as a firm ally of the British. His murder shocked the members of his band and other local Ojibwa bands. Charles McEwan, the killer was charged and tried, but the Indian witnesses did not attend the trial and he was subsequently acquitted for lack of evidence. Nimquasim, a local Indian chief, met with Augustus Jones on February 15, 1797, and confessed to Jones that he and the local Indian bands were inclined to wage open war against the British over the event. Jones relayed this information to British administrator Peter Russell. The town of York had about 675 white settlers and 135 soldiers, a number that Russell believed might not be sufficient to address an Indian rebellion. If a winter rebellion transpired York would be cut off from large garrisons at the Bay of Quinte and the Niagara Peninsula. Russell and John Graves Simcoe both anticipated rebellion for the next year or so, but it never came. Joseph Brant, a Mohawk chief who had travelled to England cautioned the tribes against rebellion as he knew the military strength of the British was likely to render any war a losing one. Russell, however, set out to undermine alliances and friendships between the Indian bands of southern Ontario, fearing such an uprising.

Jones spent 1797 surveying Pickering, Glanford, Oxford and Blenheim. His survives duties in 1798 included Burford, Lake Shore Road, the Humber River, the Grand River, Uxbridge, Gwillumbury and the de Puisaye settlement. In 1799, Jones conducted a census of the residents of Hope Township, Hamilton Township, Haldimand Township, Cramahe Township and Percy Township. The census include the names of all residents and details on the conditions of their lots. That year, he also surveyed the Humber Mill Reserve, Yarmouth, Gore, Newark and Stamford.

== Farmer, magistrate and militia captain ==
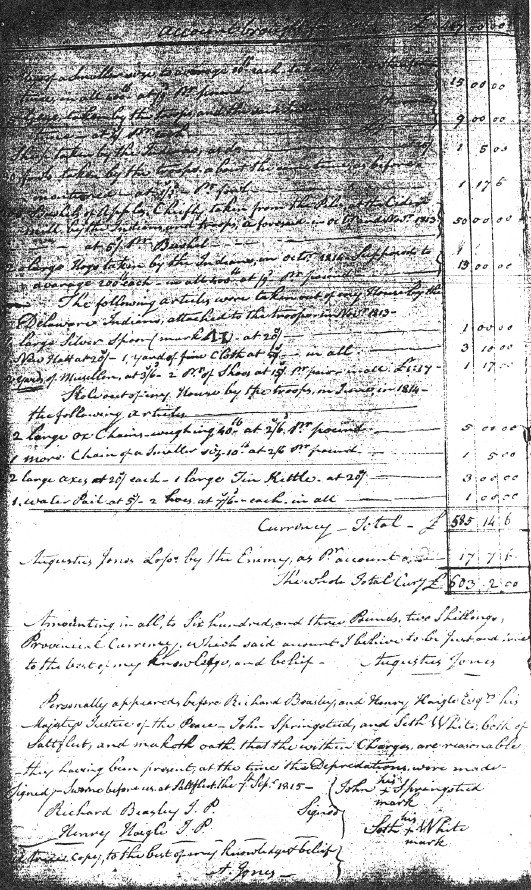
Jones' claim for damages incurred during the War of 1812.

Jones retired from his surveying work in 1800. Various reasons have been suggested for this step. One news item from 1995 offered this explanation:

The cause was a dispute over the rights of the Six Nations to sell their land. Simcoe and his successors claimed they could not sell land without permission of the government. Joseph Brant believed the Six Nations had the same rights to sell as other Loyalist land grantees. Jones strongly supported Brant’s position. Although the government relented in 1798 and allowed the Six Nations to sell some of their land, Jones’ outspoken opinion on the matter cost him further government work.

Others have suggested that Jones was known as an extremely hard worker, and may have wanted less strenuous work as a farmer, his ties to Joseph Brant may have been politically problematic as Brant was frequently in conflict with Upper Canada authorities, and his status as a loyalist to the British Empire may have come into question as it became known his brother in law, James Gage, had fought with the Americans during the revolution, and his brother Ebenezer may have as well. Whatever the cause of his retirement, Jones returned to his farm in Saltfleet Township and began life as a farmer.

Jones was already a prominent citizen in Saltfleet Township. He had been a militia captain there since 1794. He also became a local magistrate. In 1801, he and his wife joined the Methodist Episcopal church in the area. Jones retired from the militia in 1811, but remained in Saltfleet Township until 1817, when he moved with his family to Brantford to live with the Mohawk community and his wife's extended family. During the War of 1812, his farm had suffered £250 in damages. On May 27, 1815, arsonists set fire to his barn, which Jones believed was an effort to force him to cease his investigation into a local murder of three Indians. These financial losses, coupled with prejudice from his white neighbours towards Jones due to his Indian wife and children and their knowledge he had previously been married to two Indian women simultaneously led to the move. Jones made one last survey in 1825, resurveying the line of Dundas Street between Ancaster Township and West Flamborough Township. In Brantford he supported his family both by farming, and by selling of bits of land he had accumulated in his youth. After several years in Brantford, he moved to his estate Cold Springs on Dundas Street east of Paris, Ontario, where he farmed until his death.

== Family life ==
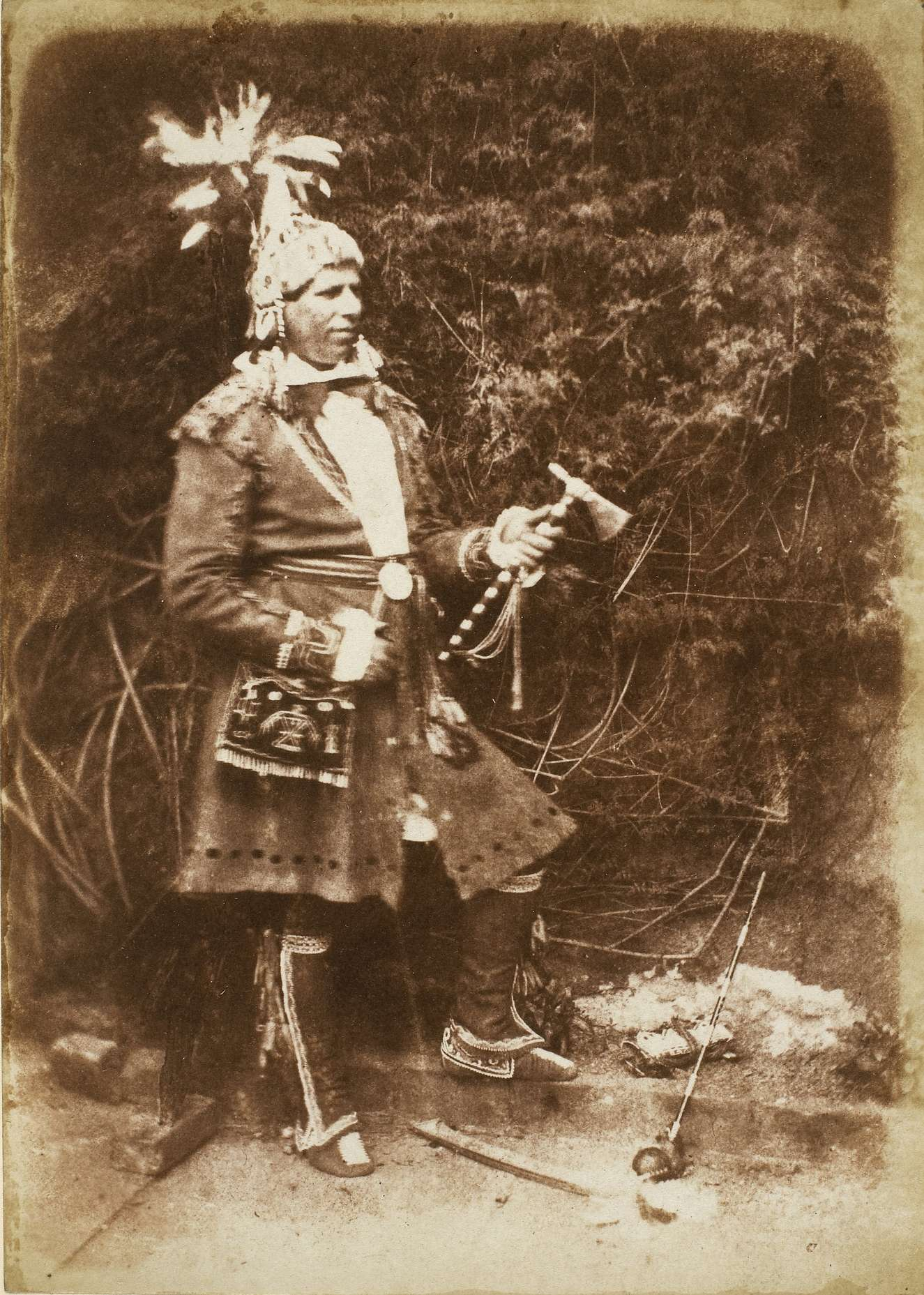
Peter Jones, Augustus Jones' younger son by Tuhbenahneequay. This photograph was taken August 4, 1845, by Hill & Adamson in Edinburgh, Scotland. It is the oldest surviving photograph of a North American Indian.

On April 27, 1798, Jones married Sarah Tekarihogen (Tekerehogen), the daughter of Mohawk chief Tekarihogen. The couple would have a total of eight children. Their children were named Catherine, Rachel, Mary, Henry, Joseph, Sally, Lucretia and Augustus Junior (born 1818). Through his marriage to Sarah Tekarihogen, Jones became a relative and friend of Joseph Brant who gave him two large tracts of land on the Haldimand Tract, made Jones his land purchase agent, and an executor of his will.

While married to Sarah Tekarihogen, Jones maintained a relationship with Tuhbenahneequay (Sarah Henry), the daughter of Mississauga chief Wahbanosay. Jones had previously hired Wahbanosay as a guide during some of his surveying expeditions in the area, including the surveying of Yonge Street. Their relationship had begun in the mid-1790s, and Jones had previously married Tuhbenahneequay in a Mississauga ceremony. Their first son, John (anglicised as Theyandanegea, written in Ojibwa as Tyenteneged, after Joseph Brant) was born in 1798. Their second son, Peter Jones (Kahkewaquonaby) was born January 1, 1802, to Tuhbenahneequay in the area of Burlington Heights. Due to Jones' marriage to Sarah Tekarihogen, the task of raising Peter and John was left to Tuhbenahneequay. It was soon after their second son's birth that the relationship between Jones and Tuhbenahneequay ended. Jones wanted the respect of his Christian neighbours, who disapproved of polygamy, and so Jones settled permanently with Sarah Tekarihogen, who had converted to Christianity. Tuhbenahneequay still refused conversion to Christianity following her divorce from Jones; she married and had eight children with Ojibwa Chief Mesquacosy.

Although Jones took no part in the raising of his children by Tuhbenahneequay, he did take an active interest in their welfare. In 1805, he secured a pair of two-square-mile plots of land near the mouth of the Credit River for his two sons from the local Mississauga Indians, but the government of Upper Canada would not recognise the title. In 1816, Jones feared that the Mississauga band his sons John and Peter lived with would fall apart, in the aftermath of the War of 1812, the famine of 1816's harvest and the influx of settlers to the area in recent years. Jones travelled to find the boys, and brought them to his farm in Stoney Creek. He arranged for the boys to be schooled in Stoney Creek, as neither spoke much English. After nine months, Jones felt that Peter's command of English was sufficient, and took him out of school to teach him the farming craft. The next year, Jones and his family relocated to land near Paris, Ontario along the Grand River, and Jones brought his son Peter with them. Peter lived with his father for seven years there.

Jones died on November 16, 1836, near Paris, Ontario. He was buried at Cold Springs, where his farm was located. After the death of his son Peter in 1856, Jones' remains were moved to Greenwood Cemetery in Brantford, Ontario, and interred beside Peter's. His grave was unmarked.

== Honours ==
On September 10, 2005, the city of Hamilton, Ontario, unveiled a statue of Jones in Stoney Creek Town Square as part of the Olde Town Urban Design Plan to establish a 'sense of place' and a functional aesthetic and character for the historic downtown in time for the bicentennial of the Battle of Stoney Creek.

A 1995 news article summarized the value of the major surveys completed by Augustus Jones as follows. "The work he did 200 years ago determined the eventual geographic and political boundaries of Centre Wellington and much of southern Ontario."
