= Elizabeth Field (author) =

Canadian writer and artist

Elizabeth "Eliza" Field (June 1, 1804 – August 17, 1890) was an English-born Canadian writer and artist. She was also known as Elizabeth Jones, Elizabeth Jones Carey and Kecheahgahmequa.

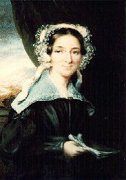
Portrait of Eliza Field, made in 1832 by London painter Matilda Jones.

== Biography ==
The daughter of Charles Field, a soap and candle manufacturer, and Elizabeth Carter, she was born in Lambeth and attended a boarding school in Surrey. When her mother died in 1820, she returned home to look after her younger brothers and sisters. In 1831, she met Peter Jones, an Ojibwa Methodist minister from Canada who was raising funds to support his missionary work; they married in New York City in 1833 despite opposition by her parents and many of her friends. They settled in a cabin on the Credit River Indian Reserve. She was frequently ill and suffered two miscarriages and two still births. However, she taught the children about Christianity and taught the young girls how to sew. She visited England in 1837–38 with her niece Nahnebahwequa and, when she returned, gave birth to a son. From 1841 to 1849, they worked at the Muncey mission near London in Canada West. Her husband's was frequently ill during this period. In 1851, they moved to a house in Brantford; her husband died five years later.

In 1858, she married John Carey, a farmer from New York. It was not a happy marriage and she appears to have separated from Carey several years later. She taught painting in Brantford and continued to write for a time. Around 1880, she lost her sight.

In 1838, she published Memoir of Elizabeth Jones, a little Indian girl, an account of the life of her niece. In 1854, she received a prize for her miniature watercolours at the Upper Canada Provincial Exhibition. She arranged for the publication of Peter's diaries as Life and journals in 1860 and of his History of the Ojebway Indians in 1861. Field also added her own drawings to History. She wrote Sketch of the life of Captain Joseph Brant, Thayendanagea which appeared in the New Dominion Monthly in 1872.

Field died in Brantford at the age of 84.
