= James Givins =

Colonel James Givins

Chief Superintendent of Indian Affairs
- In office 1 April 1830 – 12 June 1837
- Preceded by: Henry Charles Darling
- Succeeded by: Samuel Jarvis

Personal details
- Born: c. 1759; Unknown location, possibly Ireland
- Died: 5 March 1846 Toronto, Canada West
- Spouse: Angelica Andrews (m. 1797)
- Children: Saltern Givins; Caroline Ann Givins

Military service
- Allegiance: Great Britain; United Kingdom
- Branch/service: British Army; Canadian militia
- Rank: Colonel
- Unit: Queen's Rangers; York Militia; Indian Department
- Battles/wars: American Revolutionary War (POW); War of 1812

Colonel James Givins (sometimes James Givens) (circa 1759 – 5 March 1846) was a British Army officer and militiaman who fought in the American Revolution and the War of 1812. He was also a senior officer in the Indian Department of Upper Canada, serving as Chief Superintendent from 1830 to 1837. He is the namesake of Givins Street in Toronto.

== Early life ==
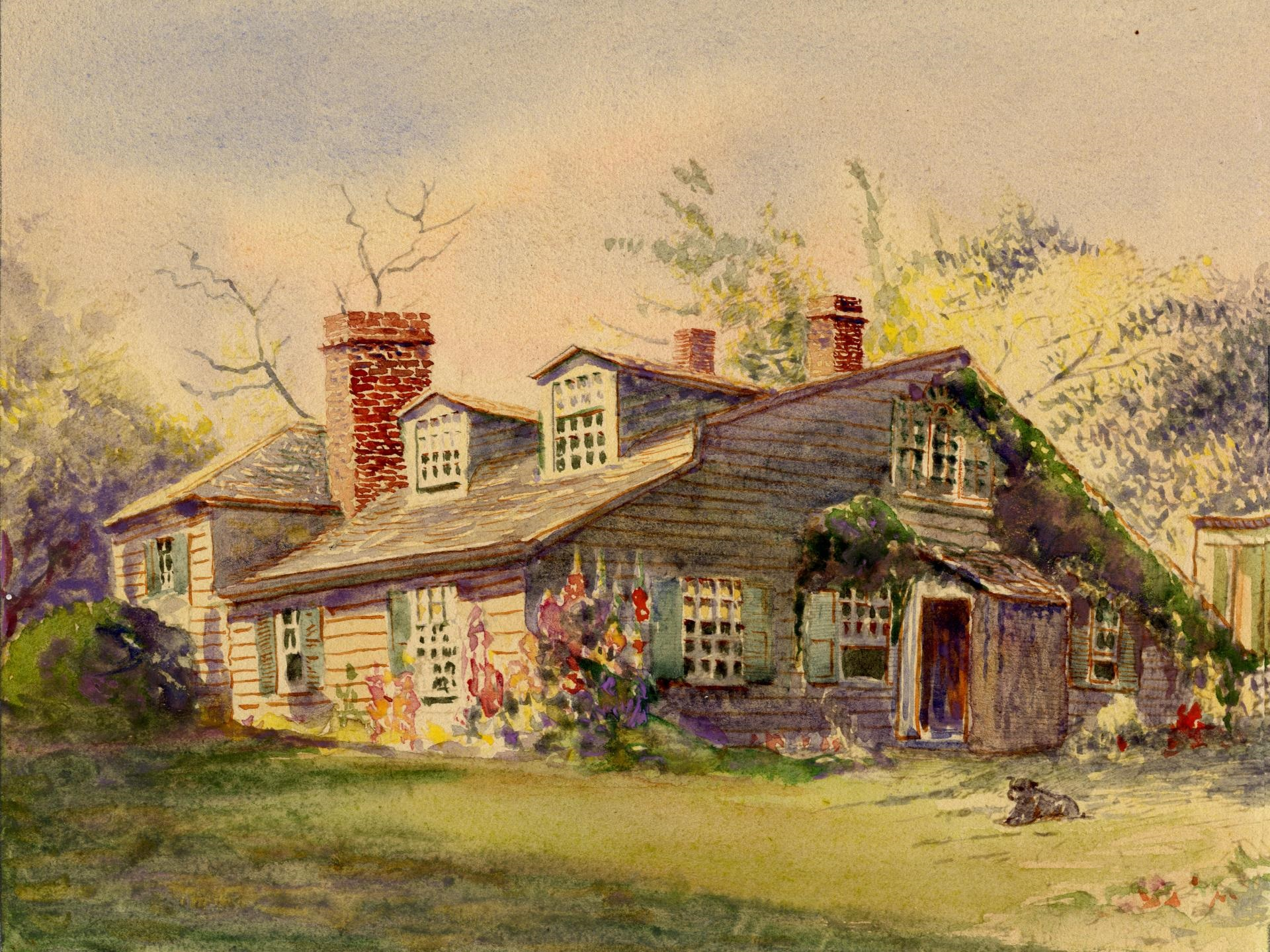
Givins constructed this house in 1802, when he was a lieutenant. When it was demolished in 1891 it was considered Toronto's oldest house.

Givins place of birth is unknown, but it has been suggested he was born in Ireland. He may have been related to Henry Hamilton, as John Graves Simcoe referred to him as having been "bred up" by Hamilton. Givins came to Fort Detroit when Hamilton was posted there in 1775. Part of a British unit that seized Fort Vincennes, Indiana, in 1778, Givins was captured by American forces when they retook the post in 1779 and spent two years as a prisoner of war.

Givins was released in 1781. No record exists of his activities until he was appointed a lieutenant with the Queen's Rangers on 30 November 1791. Knowledgeable in Ojibwe, he served as a courier and interpreter for Lieutenant Governor Simcoe in Simcoe's dealings with the province's Indians. In June 1797 he was appointed the post of Indian Agent for the town of York by Peter Russell. Among Givins's duties were various official interactions with Indian bands, such as the distribution of annual gifts due from land surrenders. He was also charged with the task of keeping the Six Nations of Upper Canada under Joseph Brant's leadership from forming a viable alliance with the Mississaugas of Upper Canada. He married Angelica Andrews on 29 December 1797. In 1802 Givins built a large estate west of Toronto on land he received as a loyalist fighter in the American Revolution. He dubbed the estate Pine Grove. The Queen's Rangers were disbanded in 1803, and Givins was made a captain of the 5th foot regiment on 19 November 1803.

== War of 1812 ==
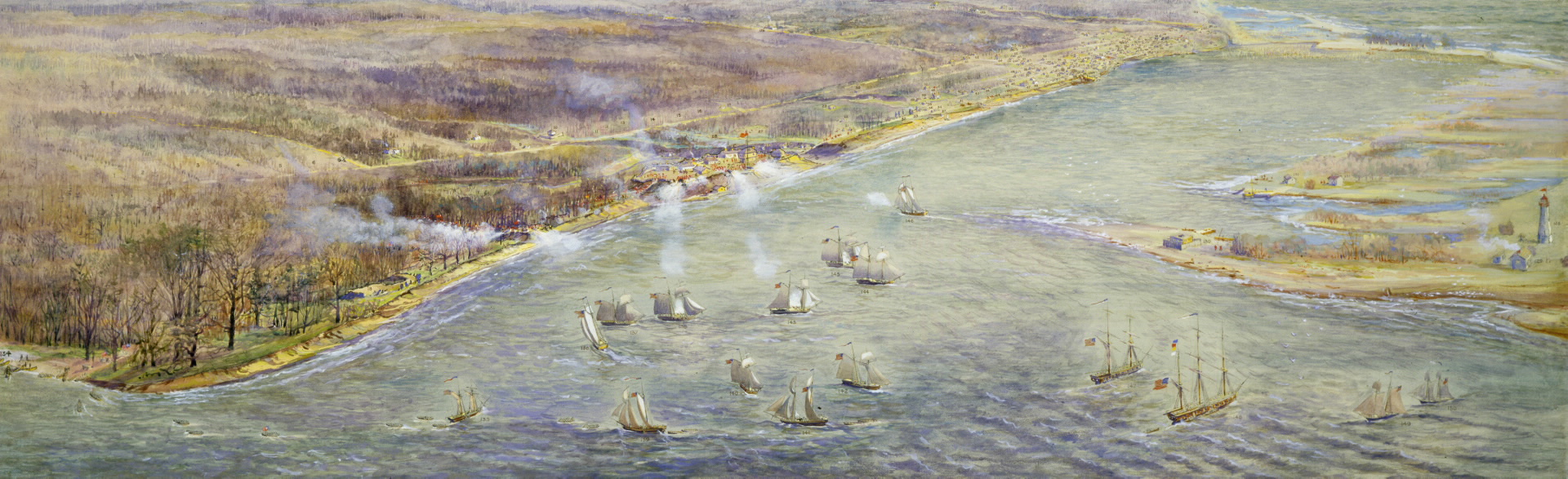
The Battle of York. Givins fought alongside the Mississauga who were the main force to oppose the Americans landing on the shore.

Although Givins had retired from the military, he was recalled to active service at the outbreak of the War of 1812. He was given the rank of major in the York Militia and appointed Provincial Aide-de-Camp to General Isaac Brock. Givins fought in several battles, including the Battle of Detroit and on the Niagara Peninsula.

In his role as an officer in the Indian Department, Givins helped coordinate a band of Mississauga warriors during the Battle of York on 27 April 1813. His performance there was favourably noted by Sir Roger Hale Sheaffe, when the men under his command were the first to engage the landing American troops. After coming under fire from the Americans, and their own relief failing to arrive, he and his men retreated to Pine Grove where his wife Angelica attended to their wounds. Blood from the wounded stained the floors, which remained stained until the house was demolished in 1891.

== Later life ==
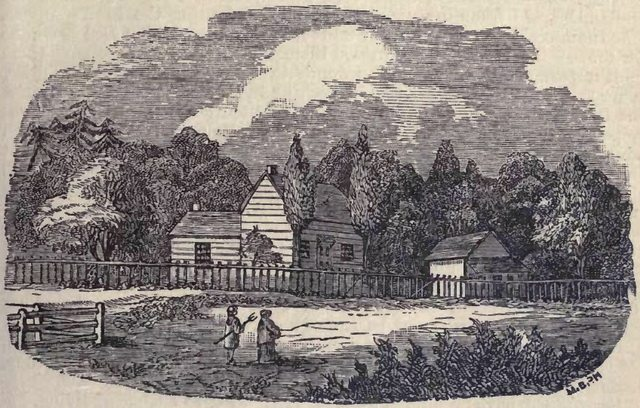
The Credit River Mission

Givins remained a militia member after the war's end, although his main focus was the Indian Department. He was promoted to Colonel of the 3rd Battalion of York Militia on 21 January 1820, and Colonel of the 1st Battalion of West York in 1821. After the war, the focus of the Indian Department changed, as military alliances with the Indians were no longer valuable. Instead, the Indian Department looked to convert the Indians to the British lifestyle. Givins was heavily involved with the Credit Mission, working with Mississauga leader Peter Jones to establish the settlement and pioneer it as an example Indian settlement. The success of the Credit Mission was noted in Henry Charles Darling's report on the state of the province's Indians, and the settlement became a model for the reserve system. Givins was given the job of Chief Superintendent of the Indian Department in Upper Canada in 1830. He retired in 1837, and was replaced by Samuel Jarvis.

Givins died in 1846 at his estate Pine Grove in Toronto, and was buried in St. James Cemetery.
