= Thomas Davis (chief) =

Mohawk war chief

- Tehowagherengaraghkwen
- Born: c. 1755; North America
- Died: 1837 (aged 81–82)
- Occupation: War Chief
- Known for: Important Mohawk figure
- Relatives: Joseph Brant (cousin)

Thomas Davis (c. 1755 – c. 1837) was a Mohawk war chief. In Mohawk he was called Tehowagherengaraghkwen.

== Early life ==
Davis' place of birth is uncertain, but he was probably born in upstate New York.

== Military life ==
During the American Revolution, Davis fought as an ally of the British, rising to the position of war chief. After Britain's defeat, he travelled to Upper Canada with his cousin Joseph Brant, settling on the Six Nations reserve, building a farm about five miles north of the Mohawk Village which became Brantford. During the War of 1812, Davis was active on the British side.

== Religious conversion ==
Sometime before 1820, Davis was baptised an Anglican. There was little access to missionaries or priests near his home on the Grand River. Reverend Ralph Leeming made occasional trips through the area. Otherwise lay preachers conducted religious services. Davis took a leadership role in the religious community of the area. He quit drinking around 1820, and began holding prayer meetings at his farm. He called local Mohawks to prayer by blowing a horn, and read sections from the Bible and the Church of England prayerbook to those who attended. In 1823, a white settler heard the horn, and learnt of the prayer meetings. He offered to arrange for Methodist preachers to visit. His offer was accepted, and preacher Edmund Stoney and ordained minister Alvin Torry began making regular trips to the area. As converting Mohawks began to settle around Davis' farm, the area became known as Davisville. Peter Jones brought a number of Mississaugas who had converted to Methodism there in 1824, and Davis' house became insufficient for both his residence and the Methodism mission, so Davis retired to a log cabin while his house was used by the Methodists. The Mississaugas left for the Credit Mission in 1826, and Davisville was once again a purely Mohawk Methodist settlement. By the time of Davis' death, around 150 of the 2000 Mohawks along the Grand River had converted to Methodism. About the same time the Mission site of Davisville was abandoned as spring flood severity increased along the Grand River after forests were cleared to build farms.
