= Peter Edmund Jones =

Mississauga Ojibwe physician, chief, and editor

- Kahkewaquonaby
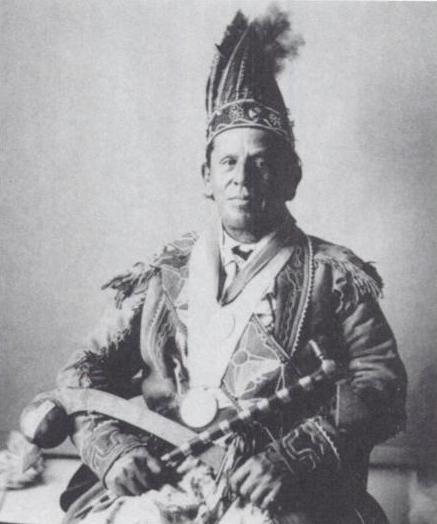
- Jones in 1898, wearing the attire of his father, Peter Jones
- Born: 30 October 1843; London, Canada West (now London, Ontario, Canada)
- Died: 29 June 1909 (aged 65); Hagersville, Ontario, Canada
- Education: Toronto School of Medicine
- Alma mater: Queen's College (MD, 1866)
- Occupations: Physician, editor, political leader
- Known for: One of the first Status Indian physicians in Canada; editor of The Indian; chief of the Mississaugas of the New Credit First Nation
- Office: Chief of the Mississaugas of the New Credit First Nation
- Spouse: Charlotte Dixon
- Parent(s): Peter Jones and Eliza Field
- Medical career
- Field: Medicine

Peter Edmund Jones M.D. (30 October 1843 – 29 June 1909) was a Mississauga Ojibwa chief of New Credit. In Ojibwe he was called Kahkewaquonaby, named after his father in two languages.

The third child of Peter Jones and Eliza Field, Jones was born in London, Canada West. He was raised at the Muncey Mission, and later Brantford. He was educated first by his governess, and later at Brantford Grammar School. Although one quarter indigenous in heritage, he was raised in a largely Western fashion. Jones, who attended medical school initially at the Toronto School of Medicine and then at Queen's College, he obtained a medical degree from Queen's in 1866. He is the first known Status Indian to obtain such a degree in Canada.

After obtaining his medical degree, Jones moved to Hagersville, Ontario, and set up a practice in New Credit. Jones became involved in politics, both on the reserve and off. He was elected a chief of New Credit from 1874 to 1877, and 1880–1886. He developed connections in the Conservative Party of Canada, where he argued for more Native rights and more Native control over their affairs. Unsuccessful in this, he did receive an appointment as the Indian Agent for New Credit in 1887, which he held until 1896.

Jones edited The Indian, a journal for indigenous people. The journal was published in 1885–1886, and ran a total of 24 issues. It was the first Canadian journal for indigenous people edited by an indigenous person. The journal was distributed on Indian reserves across Ontario.

Like his father, Jones lived across the cultural gap between the whites of Canada and the indigenous people of the land. He married an English woman, Charlotte Dixon, but intended to raise any children as Ojibwe. His cousin George Henry attempted to dislodge him as the New Credit band's doctor on the grounds that he was only one-quarter First Nation, but failed. Jones practiced taxidermy, which was uncommon among First Nations, and was an avid chess player. But he also refused to relinquish his Indian status, a practice that was encouraged by the Indian Department for educated indigenous individuals.

Jones died in Hagersville, Ontario, in 1909.
