= Wahbanosay =

- Wahbanosay's signature, from the text of the Toronto Purchase.
- Born: fl. 1778; Ontario, Canada
- Died: 1806; Ontario, Canada
- Other names: Waabanose, Waubuno

Chief Wahbanosay (Waabanose in the Fiero spelling, Waubuno as spelt by Jones) (fl. 1778 - d. 1806) was a Mississaugas chief of the Eagle doodem, in the Burlington, Ontario area. His Ojibwe name is translated as "Walks in the Dawn" or "Morning Light".

== Life ==
Wahbanosay was the negotiator for the Mississaugas of the Gunshot treaty in 1783. He was also a signatory to land surrender #8 in 1797 of lands in the Burlington Heights area, the Toronto Purchase in 1805, and Surrender #14, which surrendered additional lands in the Burlington area in 1806.

He married a Mississauga woman named Puhgashkish and had a daughter, Tuhbenahneequay. He also married Naishenum and had a son, Nawahjegezhegwabe (Joseph Sawyer).

During the 1790s, Wahbanosay worked as a guide for Deputy Surveyor General Augustus Jones, who married his daughter Tuhbenahneequay. The couple had two children: John Jones and Peter Jones.
