= John Cameron (chief) =

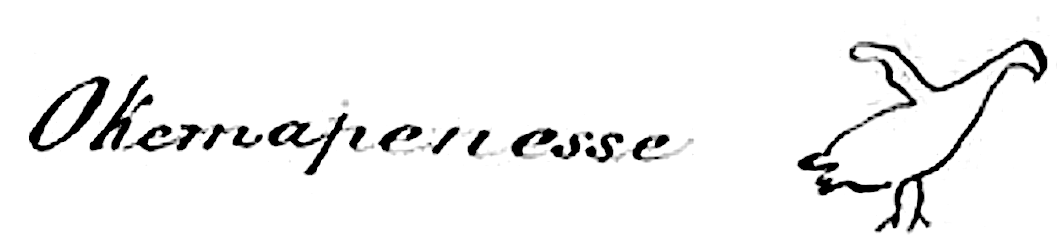
- Okemapenesse's signature, from the text of the Toronto Purchase.
- Born: May 1764; Credit River, Ontario, Canada
- Died: September 28, 1828 (aged 64); Credit Mission, Ontario, Canada
- Other names: Ogimauh-binaessih, Okemapenesse, Weggishgomin

John Cameron (May 1764–September 28, 1828), also known as Ogimauh-binaessih (from the Anishinaabe language: Ogimaa-binesiinh, "chief little-bird") or Wageezhegome (from the Anishinaabe language: Wegiizhigomi, "Who Possesses the Day"), was one of two principal Indigenous Mississauga Ojibwa chiefs, member of the eagle doodem, and farmer. He was born at Credit River, Ontario, and died at the Credit Mission (Mississauga), Upper Canada.

== Early life ==
Wageezhegome was born in May 1764 at Credit River, Ontario. During his youth, he witnessed significant changes in his people's lifestyle, marked by the arrival of thousands of white settlers after the 1776 American Revolution into what is now southern Ontario. This led to treaty negotiations in which the Mississauga surrendered much of their hunting territory and fishing grounds. Close contact with the settlers also introduced a series of epidemics, such as the smallpox epidemics in the New World reaching them, against which the Indians had no immunity. As the Mississaugas’ society collapsed, many of the Mississaugas turned to alcoholism. However, Wageezhegome did not. Instead, Wageezhegome learned some English and rudimentary farming skills. He attended a school and adopted the name of John Cameron. After the death of his tutor David Ramsay, Cameron settled on the flats of the Credit River to farm.

== Chief ==
In August 1805, Cameron succeeded his father as one of the band's two chiefs. During this period, Wageezhegome then received the title Ogimauh-binaessih. He was a signatory to several treaties, including Surrenders #3¾, #8, #13, #13a, #14, #22 and #23.

When Peter Jones arrived at the Credit in late 1824, John Cameron gave Jones his full support. Cameron converted to Christianity in 1824; he moved to Brantford in 1824 and back to the Credit River in 1826. Shortly before Jones's arrival the 60-year-old chief had married Wechikiwekapawiqua (baptized Catharine Cameron), the Jones's 17-year-old half-sister.

At the Credit Mission, Cameron's daughter, Charlotte, was born on February 24, 1828. Later that year he suddenly became ill and he died on September 30, 1828. Peter Jones, who succeeded him as chief the next year, later recalled that he had said shortly before dying, "I thank the Lord that I have lived to see all my people serve the Great Spirit."

== See also ==
- Classification of indigenous peoples of the Americas
- Indigenous peoples of the Americas
- Population history of indigenous peoples of the Americas
