= Tuhbenahneequay =

Native American methodist, also known as Sarah Henry

Tuhbenahneequay (c. 1780–1873) was a Mississauga woman from the Burlington Heights area of Upper Canada. The daughter of chief Wahbanosay and Puhgashkish, she married Augustus Jones in a Mississauga ceremony sometime in the 1790s. Their first child, Thayendanegea, was born in 1798. The same year, Jones married another woman, Sarah Tekarihogen, in a Christian ceremony. Polygamy was an acceptable practice among the Mississaugas, and Jones lived with Tekarihogen at his farm in Stoney Creek and with Tuhbenahneequay as his wife while surveying. Tuhbenahneequay was baptised Sarah Henry by an American Methodist circuit-rider in 1801. She was the first Mississauga woman baptised a Methodist. Despite her baptism, she refused to become a Christian. Her second child by Augustus Jones, Kahkewaquonaby, later known as the missionary Peter Jones, was born in 1802. The same year, Jones ended his relationship with Tuhbenahneequay as he wanted the respect of his white Christian neighbours and Tuhbenahneequay refused to convert. Both children were left with Tuhbenahneequay.

She later married Chief Mesquacosy, with whom she had 8 children, including Maungwudaus in 1811 and Wahbunoo in 1817. After the conversion of her son Kahkewaquonaby to Methodism in 1823, she was quickly converted, and moved to Davis' Hamlet where he was living in 1824. She followed him to the Credit Mission around 1826.

One hundred fifty trees at Toronto Carrying-Place Trail were named Tuhbenahneequay Ancient Grove in her honour.
