= Kineubenae =

- Kineubenae's signature, from the text of the Toronto Purchase.
- Born: c. 1750; Ontario, Canada
- Died: 1812; Ontario, Canada
- Other names: Quinipeno, Quenebenaw

Chief Kineubenae (also recorded as Golden Eagle, Quinipeno, Quenebenaw, Quenepenon, etc.) (c. 1750–1812), was an 18th-century chief of the Mississauga Ojibwa, located on the north shore of Lake Ontario. His name Giniw-bine in the Anishinaabe language means "golden eagle[-like partridge]". He was a member of the Nigig-doodem (Otter Clan).

== Biography ==
As the principal chief of the Mississaugas on Twelve Mile (Bronte) Creek, Kineubenae frequently represented the Mississaugas in negotiations with the Crown. Notably, he negotiated with the British in 1805 over the proposed sale of the "Mississauga Tract." He was hesitant to give up the land, and told William Claus, deputy superintendent general of Indian affairs in Upper Canada:

"it is hard for us to give away more land. The young Men & Women have found fault with so much having been sold before: it is true we are poor, & the Women say we will be worse, if we part with any more."

Only after further pressure did he comply, along with a promise that the Mississaugas would keep the river mouths and their rights to the fisheries. But by 1806, Kineubenae was protesting against settler encroachments on the fisheries. He was a signatory on major land treaties around Lake Ontario, including the 1797 Brant Tract Treaty, and the 1805 Toronto Purchase (Treaty 13).

== Death ==
By 1812, most of the land previously held by the Mississaugas had been surrendered to the British. Kineubenae had become old and weak, and attempted to inspire others with the strength of his people's traditions.

A group of Mississaugas gathered around the old chief, and he explained that through a long fast he had obtained spiritual powers, with protection against arrows and bullets. To demonstrate this, he held a tin kettle and had one of the men fire at him, claiming that he would collect the musket ball in the kettle. The marksman fired and the chief died.

The circumstances of Kineubenae's death helped facilitate the later work of Peter Jones and others in converting demoralized Mississaugas to Christianity.
