= David Ramsay (trader) =

Scottish murderer and trader

David Ramsay (c. 1740 – c. 1810) was a controversial figure born in Leven, Scotland, who served as a cabin boy in the British Royal Navy, participated in the siege of Louisbourg in 1758 and later acted as a courier, translator and fur and alcohol trader, in part of the lower Great Lakes region consisting of present-day southern Ontario, Canada, and western New York state.

Several conflicting images emerge of Ramsay regarding his conduct amongst the native people of the region while engaged as a trader. One cluster of accounts preserved in the 18th and 19th century oral tradition of Loyalist settlers in the area around Long Point, Ontario, draws mostly on stories told by the wife of local settler Frederick Mabee in the early 19th century and portray Ramsay as a quintessential "pioneer hero" figure who strikes out at local natives only in preservation of his life and property, against the onslaught of the local Ojibwa people who sought to harm him without cause.

Another perspective, derived from native oral accounts in the early 19th century by missionary Peter Jones, present a decidedly different version of Ramsay's activities in Upper Canada. This latter version is also more in keeping with Ramsay's own legal declaration on May 15, 1772, at Fort Niagara, after he surrendered himself to British colonial legal authorities.

In this account, Ramsay confessed that in March 1772, on the banks of Kettle Creek north of the present day community of Port Stanley, Ontario, "in defense of his life", he had killed an Ojibwa man named Wandagan, as well as two women who were also present while other natives were absent from the camp. Ramsay also admitted that he had scalped all three adult individuals involved and also kidnapped two local children who were in the company of the natives, one aged twelve, removing them to the Long Point area.

The following month he claimed to have been approached by local Ojibwas in the vicinity of Long Point, and after lying to them regarding the origin of the children, who he claimed were "English", was taken prisoner, tied up, and placed by the fire. Ramsay stated in his declaration that he then managed to release his bonds, and proceeded to kill four adult natives and a child before making an escape. In all cases Ramsay maintained that he had acted in defense of his life and property and that he had initially been accosted by the Ojibwa on Kettle Creek when he had refused them a share in his cache of trade alcohol.

British colonial Superintendent of Indian Affairs at the time, Sir William Johnson, who had read Ramsay's declaration and conferred with local native informants, believed that Ramsay's actions were not in self-defense, but rather constituted homicide and concluded that the murders and scalpings were "inexcusable and the circumstances of his being able to do all this, is an evident proof that he was not in the danger he represents and that the Indians were too much in the liquor to execute any bad purpose." Ramsay's actions, in particular his scalping of his victims which according to Ojibwa custom constituted an act of war, precipitated a crisis in relations between British colonial authorities and the regional native population. Johnson attributed the killings to the "private act of a villain", not official British policy, and achieved an at least temporary resolution to the situation, by distributing a shipment of gifts to native leaders in the area. Johnson also ordered the recall of all regional traders to local military posts until further notice and called for a redistribution of British troops in the region in the face of potential open conflict. He further ordered the transfer of the prisoner Ramsay to Montreal for a criminal trial. Johnson stated that he believed that Ramsay deserved "capital punishment" for his actions, but believed that a fair trial was unobtainable under the circumstances and personally did not "think that [Ramsay] will suffer, had he killed a hundred." Johnson's prediction held true and despite Ramsay allegedly bragging about the killings while under guard in Montreal and indicating that he would repeat his actions upon release, received no punishment, at least partly due to the prosecution providing no native witnesses.

There is some evidence to suggest that Ramsay, later in life, modified his attitude toward native people and is known to have acted on their behalf in several matters pertaining to issues between them and the colonial government. Almost nothing is known about Ramsay in later life, apart from his possession of a large tract of land in Upper Canada and his ownership of a trading ship in the port of New York. Ramsay disappears from the historical record circa 1810.

== David Ramsay In local legend ==
A number of regional legends, traceable to stories told by white settlers in the mid to late 19th century in southern Ontario, have arisen surrounding the figure of David Ramsay. In one such tale, Ramsay is presented as a fur-trader who manages to evade natives along the north shore of Lake Erie with a boat loaded with gold, which he purportedly buries in a ridge at Long Point, planning to dig it up when the natives were no longer a problem.

According to the tale, Ramsay died before retrieving it, forgot all about his cache, or most likely forgot exactly where it was buried. A deacon named John Troyer learned of the legend, and reputedly using divination, acquired knowledge of its exact location. Troyer purportedly invited an 11- or 12-year-old boy, Simpson McCall, to help him claim the treasure. McCall's parents refused, fearing the Deacon's reputation. In one version of the tale excerpted from the Niagara Falls Evening Review of October 19, 1922, Troyer and the boy, in this variant referred to as his "son", go in quest of the treasure:

"They went to Long Point, arriving just enough before dark to locate the spot where the treasure was. Then they waited until exactly midnight, and then started a procession, Deacon Troyer holding the open Bible before him, and his son following with a lighted candle, with spades, picks, etc. They dug down, and presently the pick struck metal. They got the pick under the lid of the box and pried it up. And then, at that moment a black shape rose up and assumed the form of a black dog, growing bigger and bigger, and they dropped the Bible and candle and rushed for the canoe, and never had any curiosity to return to the spot."

This failed reclaiming story was purportedly told by Troyer to McCall, and McCall to J. H. Coyne, who made it public in an address at an Ontario Historical Society meeting in Norfolk County. This meeting was reported a few days later in the Niagara Falls Evening Review.

== Sources ==
- Schmalz, Peter S. (1991). The Ojibwa of Southern Ontario. University of Toronto Press. ISBN 0-8020-2736-9. pgs. 89–95
- Smith, Donald B. (1983). "Ramsay, David". In Halpenny, Francess G (ed.). Dictionary of Canadian Biography. Vol. V (1801–1820) (online ed.). University of Toronto Press.
- Chambers' Edinburgh Journal – Number 403 – Saturday, October 19, 1839 – "Adventure of a Canadian Trader" – taken from an unnamed manuscript source "a gentleman engaged in the American War" – 4,000 words, pro-Ramsay account, with allegations of Chippewa and Pawnee treachery.
