= Echo Place =

Coordinates: 43.150101°N 80.216360°W

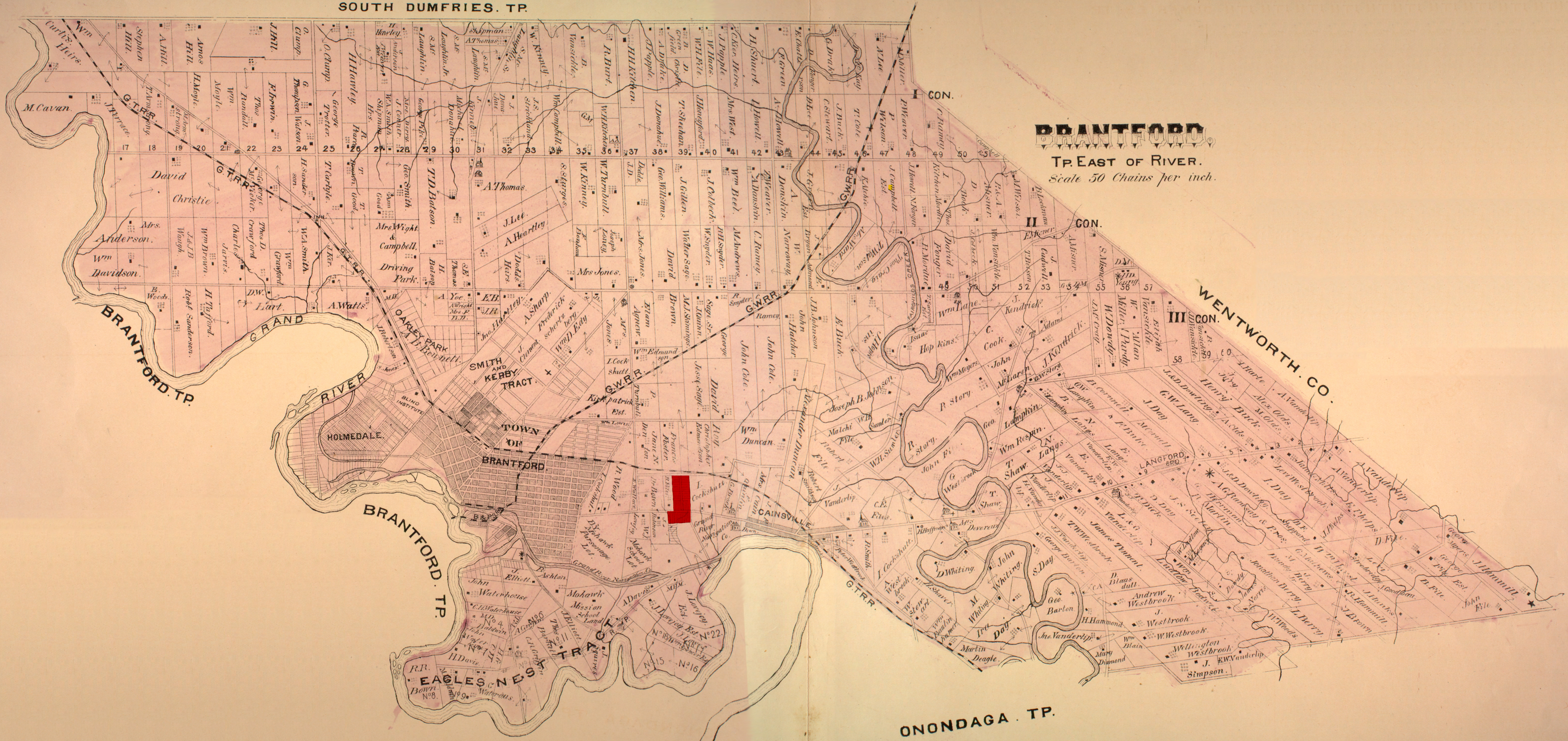
Echo Place, highlighted on a c. 1880 map of Brant County.

Echo Place is a community in Brantford, Ontario. Incorporated in 1865 east of Brantford, it was built around Springbrook Hotel.

The 1891 census found a population of 30, including three businesses: A general store/post office, a nursery and an oatmeal mill.

In 1955 it was amalgamated into Brantford.
