= John Jones (Ojibwa chief) =

Mississauga Ojibwa teacher, missionary and Chief

John Jones, also known as Thayendanegea in Ojibwe, (July 10, 1798 – May 4, 1847) was a Mississauga Ojibwa teacher, missionary and Chief.

Jones was born to Augustus Jones and Tuhbenahneequay on July 10, 1798 in the Humber River valley. Augustus Jones and Tuhbenahneequay had been married in the 1790s in an Ojibwa ceremony. Jones was named Thayendanegea, sometimes spelt Tyantenagen, for his father's friend Joseph Brant. The year of Jones' birth, his father married a Mohawk woman, Sarah Tekarihogen, in a Christian ceremony. Augustus Jones lived with Tekarihogen on his farm at Stoney Creek, Ontario during much of the year, and Tuhbenahneequay while surveying. In 1802, Tuhbenahneequay and Augustus Jones ended their relationship, and John Jones' care, as well of that of his full brother Peter, was left to his mother.

In 1816, their father fetched John and Peter to live with him and his wife at his farm in Stoney Creek. Both Peter and John were enrolled at a local school, as neither spoke much English. The next year, the family moved to the Grand River Valley, near Brantford. Jones later enrolled in a Hamilton school to study his father's profession, surveying.

In 1823, upon his brother Peter's conversion to Methodism, Jones took up work as a schoolteacher at the missions where Peter worked, first Davisville near Brantford, then the Credit Mission. The year 1823 also saw Jones marry Christina Brant (Kayatontye), the granddaughter of his namesake Joseph Brant. Jones was licensed to exhort by the Methodist Church on August 22, 1828. Joseph Sawyer was licensed at the same time, and the pair became the second Indigenous persons to be licensed to exhort by the Methodist Church, only Jones' brother Peter having already been so licensed.

In 1830, Jones' wife died of disease, as did four of their five children. Jones himself was struck with consumption, which forced him to resign his position of schoolteacher at the Credit Mission's school. By 1835 Jones had recovered, and married Mary Holtby, the daughter of a local Methodist preacher. They lived at the Credit Mission and Mary was given the Ojibwa name Pamekezhegooqua (Anishinaabe language: Bemi-giizhigookwe, "Woman who Goes Along the Sky"). The couple had four children. Jones was elected one of the three chiefs of the Credit band around 1840. In 1845 he served as Secretary of the Grand Council of Ojibwas at Saugeen. Jones died in 1847.
