= Wabakinine =

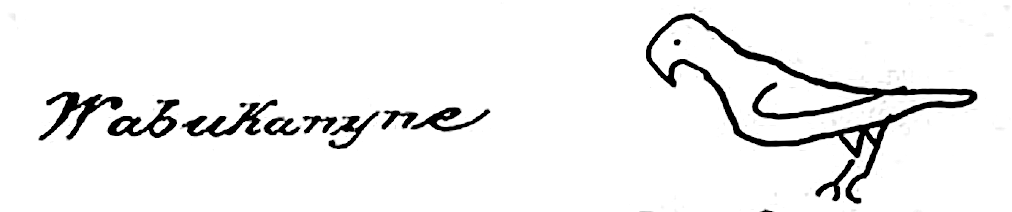
- Wabakinine's signature, from the text of the Toronto Purchase.
- Born: bef. 1760; Ontario, Canada
- Died: August 1796; Credit River, Ontario, Canada
- Other names: Wabukanyne, Wabicanine

Chief Wabakinine (bef. 1760–August 1796), also spelled Wabacoming, Wabicanine, or Waipykanine, was a Mississauga chief and warrior from the Eagle doodem.

== Life ==
By the mid-1790s, Wabakinine was the head chief of all the Mississaugas along the western coast of Lake Ontario. He was a signatory on many early land surrenders in Upper Canada, including the Niagara Purchase of 1781, another agreement in 1784 for the lands surrounding Lake Ontario, a 1795 document granting 3,500 acres to The Crown, and the 1805 Toronto Purchase.

== Death ==
In 1796 after travelling to York, Upper Canada, to sell salmon, Wabakinine camped with his band on the peninsula. In the middle of the night, a soldier of the Queen's York Rangers, Private Charles McEwan, accompanied by two other men, attempted to pull Wabakinine's sister from her bed. Earlier that evening, McEwan had offered her rum and a dollar to sleep with him. Intoxicated, Wabakinine tried to defend his sister before he was viciously beaten with a rock by McEwan. The men proceeded to beat Wabakinine's wife leaving them both with fatal injuries near what is now St. Lawrence Market. Wabakinine died the following day and his wife the day after.

== Aftermath ==
Wabakinine was a peacemaker and leader of a large band of Mississaugas; his death greatly increased the already rising tensions between Crown officials and First Nations in Upper Canada. After hearing of Wabakinine's death, Mohawk chief Joseph Brant sent a wampum belt to First Nation chiefs on the Upper Lakes, inviting them to the Grand River in the following summer for discussions with Crown officials. Eventually, as the Mississaugas were too weak to act on their own, they gave up thoughts of launching a rebellion to avenge Wabakinine's death. McEwan was detained and was allowed to flee Upper Canada thus evading trial relating to the death of Wabakinine.
