= Credit Mission =

- Mission
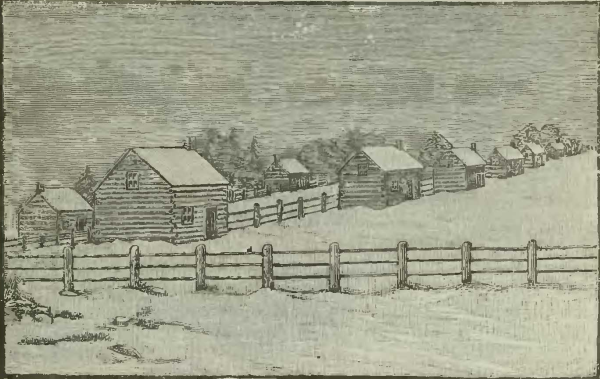
- Sketch of the Credit Mission, 1827

- Location within Southern Ontario
- Coordinates: 43°33′9″N 79°37′25″W
- Country: Upper Canada
- Established: 1826
- Defunct: 1847

The Credit Mission was an Indian Mission on the Credit River in Upper Canada from 1826–1847.

Funded with the proceeds from Purchase #22 or #23, building began in 1826 under the leadership of Peter Jones. When construction began, about 200 Indians lived at the settlement in temporary structures. Thirty log cabins were constructed on the 200 acres (0.81 km^{2}) of reserved land. That year Egerton Ryerson was assigned to the settlement as a Methodist missionary. A Methodist church was soon built, as was a school. John Jones was the school's first teacher. In the spring of 1827 40 acres (160,000 m^{2}) of land were planted with crops, mostly corn and potatoes.

== History ==
At the time of settlement, the band was led by Chief Ajetance and John Cameron. In 1829, after the death of both men, Nawahjegezhegwabe (Joseph Sawyer) and Kahkewaquonaby (Peter Jones) were elected to fill their positions.

In 1830, John Jones retired from the position of schoolteacher, as he was afflicted with Tuberculosis.

In an 1836 inspection of the settlement, Lieutenant Governor Francis Bond Head called it the "cleanest, neatest and most civilised of all the Indian settlements he had seen." Although the provincial government had initially been favorable to the settlement, relations darkened as the Indians of the Credit clung to the Methodist faith under pressure from the province to convert to Anglicanism. During the 1830s, Lieutenant Governor Sir Francis Bond Head began to plan to remove the Mississaugas of the Credit Mission to Manitoulin Island. Chief Peter Jones travelled to England, meeting with Colonial Secretary Lord Glenelg and Queen Victoria to prevent the move, as Manitoulin was too rocky to farm, and the settlers would have been forced to revert to a hunter-gatherer lifestyle. Although the Colonial office blocked Bond Head's plan, the Credit Band did not receive the title deeds that Victoria authorised her minister to grant them, and remained vulnerable to the encroachment of white settlers.

In 1840, John Jones was elected one of the three chiefs of the Credit band.

In 1847, unable to secure land rights to the mission, the Mississaugas of the Credit Mission relocated to New Credit. Title to that land was possessed by the Six Nations, who donated the land to the Mississaugas of Credit. This settlement exists to this day, as the Mississaugas of the Credit First Nation.
