= Mississaugas of the Credit First Nation =

Indigenous reserve in Canada

Mississaugas of the Credit First Nation Mazina'iga-ziibing Misi-zaagiwininiwag
- Indian reserve
- New Credit Indian Reserve No. 40A
- Location within Southern Ontario
- Coordinates: 42°59′58″N 80°05′44″W
- Country: Canada
- Province: Ontario
- County: Brant

Area (2021)
  - Land: 25.18 km^{2} (9.72 sq mi)

Population (2021)
  - Total: 775
  - Density: 30.8/km^{2} (80/sq mi)
- Website: mncfn.ca

Mississaugas of the Credit First Nation (MCFN; Ojibwe: Mazina'iga-ziibing Misi-zaagiwininiwag, meaning 'Mississauga people at the Credit River') is a First Nation of Mississaugas, an Ojibwe sub-group, in south-central Ontario, Canada. In April 2015, MCFN had an enrolled population of 2,330 people, 850 of whom lived on the reserve. The First Nation governs the 2,392.6 ha (5,912 acres) parcel of the New Credit 40A Indian Reserve known as Reserve 40B near Hagersville, Ontario. This reserve sits beside the Six Nations of the Grand River, near Brantford.

== History ==
In the 19th century, under pressure from the rapid growth of the European-origin population, the Mississaugas wanted to move from their reserve in the present-day city of Mississauga. Unable to make an agreement with the provincial government of the time, in 1848 they accepted an offer from the Six Nations Confederacy of 1,900 ha (4,800 acres) of land inside their own property, as a compensation to the Mississaugas for their authorization for the British purchase of the land in 1784 for the establishment of the Six Nations Reserve. The reserve had been granted to the Six Nations by the Haldimand Proclamation in gratitude for their military alliance with the British during the American Revolutionary War, allowing their resettlement from their previous homeland in what had become New York State. The Six Nations is the only reserve in the Canadian system with a subsection reserve. The Mississaugas eventually purchased the land gifted as well as an additional 490 ha (1,200 acres) for a sum of $10,000.00 on June 15, 1903, for the all-time right of undisturbed use and occupancy of the land. The reserve as it stands today consists of lots 1 to 12 in the first and second concessions in the Township of Tuscarora, in the County of Brant, and lots 1–12 in the first and second concessions in the Township of Oneida. In 1997, MCFN purchased an additional 24 ha (59 acres) bordering on Highway 6, Hagersville.

The First Nation made claims to land on which Toronto sits through the disputed Toronto Purchase of 1787. In 2010, Canada agreed to pay CA$145 million for the lands, based on the historic value of the land, extrapolated to 2010 dollars. The money was distributed to the MCFN government, with each of the then-1,700 Mississaugas receiving $20,000, with the rest placed in trust for future generations. The MCFN put a controversial hold on new membership during this time, ostensibly to preserve the greatest financial gain possible. The multi-million dollar settlement was only given to previously registered members despite any valid claims to membership.

On January 8, 2019, the Mississaugas of the New Credit announced that they would rename to the Mississaugas of the Credit.

== Land claim developments ==
In March 2025, the Government of Canada provided an advance payment of $30 million toward settling the Mississaugas of the Credit First Nation's specific claim under Treaties 22 and 23, dating back to 1820, involving the surrender and sale of approximately 4,427 ha (10,940 acres) of reserve land. Shortly thereafter, Canada and the Province of Ontario announced a proposed settlement totaling $183.4 million to resolve the Rouge River Valley Tract claim, which pertains to roughly 52,081.8 ha (128,697 acres) of territory on the north shore of Lake Ontario; negotiations for this claim began in 2015.

== Prominent members ==
- Harry LaForme, appellate court judge, served as head of the Truth and Reconciliation Commission of Canada
- Walt Secord, Australian politician
- Wabakinine, Mississauga Chief and warrior who died en route from York, Upper Canada, in 1796 protecting his sister from Queen's York Rangers soldier Charles McEwan
- Peter Jones (Kahkewāquonāby), Chief and Methodist minister
