= List of shipwrecks in 1893 =

The list of shipwrecks in 1893 includes ships sunk, foundered, grounded, or otherwise lost during 1893.

table of contents
1893
Jan	Feb	Mar	Apr
May	Jun	Jul	Aug
Sep	Oct	Nov	Dec
Unknown date

== January ==
=== 6 January ===
List of shipwrecks: 6 January 1893
Ship	State	Description
Black Diamond	United Kingdom	The steamship collided with Progress (United Kingdom) and sank in the River Thames.

=== 16 January ===
List of shipwrecks: 16 January 1893
Ship	State	Description
San Marco	Italy	The steamer sank after a collision in the Strait of Messina.

=== Unknown date ===
List of shipwrecks: Unknown date in January 1893
Ship	State	Description
Unnamed	United Kingdom	A steamship was driven ashore at Novorossiysk, Russia.
Unnamed	Russia	A ship was driven ashore at Novorossiysk.

== February ==
=== 2 February ===
List of shipwrecks: 2 February 1893
Ship	State	Description
E. W. Monifie	United States	The barge burned at the Railroad Wharf at Pensacola, Florida.

=== 4 February ===
List of shipwrecks: 18 February 1893
Ship	State	Description
Dicky	Queensland	Dicky The 31-metre (102 ft), 226-ton steam schooner cargo ship was driven ashore in a gale at Moffat Beach between Tooway Creek and Bunduwah Creek. She was refloated three times, but dragged anchor each time going back on the beach. The wreck still lies on the beach, which is now known as Dickie Beach, as of May 2009.

=== 13 February ===
List of shipwrecks: 13 February 1893
Ship	State	Description
Ella F. Bartlett	United States	The schooner was wrecked on Munroe Island, off Portland, Maine. The crew made it to shore.

=== 19 February ===
List of shipwrecks: 19 February 1893
Ship	State	Description
J. A. Bishop	United States	The steam tugboat burned at the Timber Wharf, Carrabelle, Florida.

=== 21 February ===
List of shipwrecks: 21 February 1893
Ship	State	Description
Coanza	United Kingdom	The Elder Dempster 1,518 GRT passenger ship ran aground and was wrecked on Bayak Rock, Baujah Reef near Sinou, Senegal. She was en route to West Africa from Hamburg.
Labourdonnais	French Navy	The sloop-of-war was wrecked on Île Sainte-Marie off the coast of Madagascar.

=== 22 February ===
List of shipwrecks: 22 February 1893
Ship	State	Description
Shamrock	United Kingdom	The iron schooner was stranded at Ballyquintin Point, County Down, Ireland and became a wreck.

=== 26 February ===
List of shipwrecks: 26 February 1893
Ship	State	Description
Clans	United Kingdom	The schooner was driven ashore and wrecked during a heavy gale off Helen's Bay, Belfast Lough, Ireland, on a voyage from Glasgow to Widnes, Lancashire; the crew were saved by coastguard with difficulty.

=== Unknown date ===
List of shipwrecks: Unknown date February 1893
Ship	State	Description
Naronic	United Kingdom	The White Star Line steamship was lost in the Atlantic Ocean after leaving Liverpool on 11 February 1893 bound for New York, possibly on 19 February, with the loss of all 74 people on board. The ship's fate remains a mystery.
Ripple	United States	The fishing schooner wrecked in fog on Santa Rosa Island, Florida on either 13 or 15 February.

== March ==
=== 3 March ===
List of shipwrecks: 3 March 1893
Ship	State	Description
Kanawha	United States	The steamer ran aground on Santa Rosa Island, Florida 12 miles (19 km) east of Pensacola Pass, possibly salvaged.

=== 7 March ===
List of shipwrecks: 7 March 1893
Ship	State	Description
John Hancock	United States	While moored at the wharf at Sand Point on the northwestern coast of Popof Island in the Shumagin Islands off the south coast of the Alaska Peninsula in the District of Alaska with a crew of eight and a cargo of 80 tons of salt and provisions aboard, the 167.62-ton, 143.7-foot (43.8 m) cod-fishing schooner broke loose from her moorings during a storm and was stranded. All on board survived, but she and her cargo both were a total loss.

=== 21 March ===
List of shipwrecks: 21 March 1893
Ship	State	Description
Helen Blum	United States	The 66.17-gross register ton, 75-foot (22.9 m) sealing schooner was seen for the last time at Ugamok Island (57.8945°N 153.3850°W) in the Shumagin Islands off the south coast of the District of Alaska′s Alaska Peninsula. She subsequently disappeared with the loss of her entire crew of 26, presumably lost in a storm that struck the area. In May 1893, wreckage believed to be from Helen Blum was discovered in the Shumagin Islands on the coasts of Chernabura Island (54.7875°N 159.5603°W) and Simeonof Island (54.8978°N 159.2667°W).

=== 23 March ===
List of shipwrecks: 23 March 1893
Ship	State	Description
Allanshaw	United Kingdom	The iron sailing ship was wrecked on Tristan da Cunha with the loss of three crew.

=== 24 March ===
List of shipwrecks: 24 March 1893
Ship	State	Description
Glückauf	Germany	Glückauf The 2,307-gross register ton oil tanker was wrecked without loss of life during a snow squall just before dawn across from Sayville, New York, at Blue Point Beach on Fire Island off the south coast of Long Island. United States Life-Saving Service personnel from the Blue Point Life-Saving Station rescued her entire crew.

=== 26 March ===
List of shipwrecks: 26 March 1893
Ship	State	Description
Octavia A. Dow	United States	The schooner ran aground on Fort Barrancas Bar, Santa Rosa Island, Florida.

=== 27 March ===
List of shipwrecks: 27 March 1893
Ship	State	Description
William H. Jordan	United States	The schooner was wrecked at Grand Bruit, Newfoundland. Crew saved.

=== 30 March ===
List of shipwrecks: 30 March 1893
Ship	State	Description
Iceland	United States	The schooner was hove down and abandoned at sea on the way to Iceland. One crewman killed, one injured. Survivors were rescued by an unknown steamer.

== April ==
=== 4 April ===
List of shipwrecks: 4 April 1893
Ship	State	Description
Horsa	United Kingdom	The sailing ship ran aground off St Martin's, Isles of Scilly; the ship was towed off but later foundered in deep water.

=== 6 April ===
List of shipwrecks: 6 April 1893
Ship	State	Description
Ernesta	United States	The schooner capsized in a squall 30 miles (48 km) off Barnegat Light, New Jersey. Six of her crewmen killed.
Lumberman	United States	The schooner, sometimes referred to a "lumbermen" or "United Lumbermen", capsized and sank in 70 feet (21 m) of water in a squall off Oak Creek, Wisconsin, 17 miles (27 km) south east of Milwaukee. The crew were rescued from her rigging by Minominee (United States). The vessel's masts were removed in June as a hazard to navigation.

=== 11 April ===
List of shipwrecks: 11 April 1893
Ship	State	Description
Helen R. Low	United States	The schooner was burned in the harbor at Gloucester, Massachusetts.
Mystic	United States	The schooner was destroyed by fire between Boston and Gloucester, Massachusetts.

=== 17 April ===
List of shipwrecks: 17 April 1893
Ship	State	Description
Nightingale	Norway	The clipper was abandoned at sea. Her crew were rescued. She was on a voyage from Liverpool, Lancashire, United Kingdom to Halifax, Nova Scotia, Canada.

=== 21 April ===
List of shipwrecks: 21 April 1893
Ship	State	Description
Newell A. Eddy	United States	Newell A. Eddy The schooner barge sank a storm after losing the towline to her tow Charles Eddy (United States) in Lake Huron striking the reef, Raynold's Reef or Spectacle Reef, her stern broke off and washed ashore on Bois Blanc Island, the rest of the ship sank in 165 feet (50 m) of water. Lost with all nine crew. The wreck was located on 25 July.

=== 28 April ===
List of shipwrecks: 28 April 1893
Ship	State	Description
Vityaz	Imperial Russian Navy	The corvette ran aground in the Korea Strait. She was abandoned by her crew the next day. Vityaz was on a voyage from Nagasaki, Japan to Port Lazaref, Joseon. Salvage was attempted in late May, but she broke up and sank in a storm that lasted from 31 May to 4 June.

=== 30 April ===
List of shipwrecks: 30 April 1893
Ship	State	Description
Seagull	United States	The wrecking tug burned to the waterline in Lake Erie off Spectacle Reef.

== May ==
=== 10 May ===
List of shipwrecks: 10 May 1893
Ship	State	Description
Vitiaz	Imperial Russian Navy	The Vitiaz-class protected cruiser was wrecked on a reef in the Sea of Japan off Port Lazarev during a typhoon.

=== 14 May ===
List of shipwrecks: 14 May 1893
Ship	State	Description
A. Everett	United States	The steamer was holed by ice Lake Superior and beached two miles (3.2 km) from Two Harbors, Minnesota.

=== 17 May ===
List of shipwrecks: 17 May 1893
Ship	State	Description
Continental	United States	The dredge was swept out of the harbor at Conneaut, Ohio out into Lake Erie by fast moving water due to heavy overnight rains. She capsized in the lake killing her captain and three crewmen and the female cook. Two crew washed ashore in her wreckage and survived. The vessel was later raised and repaired.
Pelican	United States	The schooner filled and sank in Lake Erie off the harbor at Ashtabula, Ohio in a gale. Three crew wee killed and four rescued by the tug Sunol (United States).
Walter Richardson	United States	The tug was swept out of the harbor at Conneaut, Ohio out into Lake Erie by fast moving water due to heavy overnight rains. A scow she was lashed to was cut loose but the line disabled her prop resulting in her going ashore.

=== 21 May ===
List of shipwrecks: 21 May 1893
Ship	State	Description
Almirante Barroso	Brazilian Navy	The corvette was wrecked in the Red Sea near Ras Zeith while on an around-the-world cadet cruise. The screw sloop-of-war HMS Dolphin (Royal Navy) rescued her crew.

=== 23 May ===
List of shipwrecks: 23 May 1893
Ship	State	Description
R. J. Gibbs	United States	The schooner foundered, or went ashore, a few miles below Barr Point in a storm. Equipment was salvaged. Everyone on board was rescued by Iron Chief (flag unknown).

=== 26 May ===
List of shipwrecks: 26 May 1893
Ship	State	Description
Sea Ranger	United States	While approaching the south-central coast of the District of Alaska to bury a deceased crewman, the 273.12-gross register ton, 106.8-foot (32.6 m) bark was wrecked on an uncharted reef – thereafter known as Sea Ranger Reef – north-northwest of Cape Saint Elias, 3 nautical miles (5.6 km; 3.5 mi) west of Kayak Island.

== June ==
=== 2 June ===
List of shipwrecks: 2 June 1893
Ship	State	Description
Corsican	United States	Corsican in 2015. The wooden schooner sank with the loss of her entire crew of six after colliding with the steamer Corsica (United States) in Lake Huron off the coast of Michigan ten miles (16 km) south of Thunder Bay Island. Her wreck lies in 160 feet (49 m) of water at 44.912667°N 83.055°W.

=== 21 June ===
List of shipwrecks: 21 June 1893
Ship	State	Description
S. C. Clark	United States	The steam barge burned on Lake Huron off Port Sanilac, Michigan, a total loss.

=== 22 June ===
List of shipwrecks: 22 June 1893
Ship	State	Description
HMS Victoria	Royal Navy	HMS Victoria sinking at right. The battleship HMS Nile is at left. The Victoria-class battleship collided with the battleship HMS Camperdown (Royal Navy) in the Mediterranean Sea near Tripoli, Lebanon, and sank with 358 crew killed, 357 rescued.

=== 24 June ===
List of shipwrecks: 24 June 1893
Ship	State	Description
Skater	United States	The steamer was destroyed by fire 30 miles (48 km) off Manistee, Michigan in Lake Michigan.

=== Unknown date ===
List of shipwrecks: Unknown date June 1893
Ship	State	Description
Eliza Anderson	United States	The schooner sank in Long Island Sound near Faulkner Island off the coast of Connecticut. She later was refloated and was stripped at New Haven, Connecticut, and her wreck was abandoned there, but it later was refloated again and then scuttled in deep water in Long Island Sound.

== July ==
=== 2 July ===
List of shipwrecks: 2 July 1893
Ship	State	Description
Ira H. Owen	United States	The steamer was holed by an obstruction off Cedar Point above Sault Ste. Marie, Michigan and was beached. Refloated, repaired and returned to service.

=== 3 July ===
List of shipwrecks: 3 July 1893
Ship	State	Description
Thos. Maythem	United States	The steamer was holed by an obstruction off Cedar Point above Sault Ste. Marie, Michigan and was beached. Refloated, repaired and returned to service.

=== 9 July ===
List of shipwrecks: 9 July 1893
Ship	State	Description
Harry Tilden	United States	The schooner was sunk accidentally off Sandy Hook, New Jersey, by a shot fired from the United States Army's Sandy Hook Proving Ground.

=== 21 July ===
List of shipwrecks: 21 July 1893
Ship	State	Description
David Vance	United States	The schooner, under tow of Samoa (United States), was sunk in a collision with Lizzie A. Law (United States) in the Pelee Passage in 40 feet (12 m) of water. Her crew and the captain's wife and three daughters were rescued by Samoa. Some equipment was salvaged.
Lizzie A. Law	United States	The schooner barge, under tow of Egyptian (United States), was sunk in a collision with David Vance (United States) in the Pelee Passage. Her cargo was salvaged in August. Raised on 15 September and taken to Detroit, Michigan, for repairs and returned to service.

== August ==
=== 5 August ===
List of shipwrecks: 5 August 1893
Ship	State	Description
William H. Wellington	United States	The schooner was dismasted and sunk off Coffie's Island, near Liverpool, Nova Scotia.

=== 7 August ===
List of shipwrecks: 7 August 1893
Ship	State	Description
Mary Pringle	United States	The steam barge burned at Port Huron, Michigan, a total loss.

=== 13 August ===
List of shipwrecks: 13 August 1893
Ship	State	Description
Helen F. Tredick	United States	The schooner was burned at East Pubnico, Nova Scotia. Crew safe.

=== 21 August ===
List of shipwrecks: 21 August 1893
Ship	State	Description
Mary Lizzie	United States	The fishing schooner sank in the North Atlantic Ocean off northeastern North America with the loss of five lives. Her sole survivor was rescued after 33 hours in the water by the steamer Eggleston Abbey (United Kingdom).
Volunteer	United States	Volunteer under repair post-grounding. The schooner ran aground off Naushon Island, Massachusetts and was severely damaged. She was subsequently repaired.

=== 23 August ===
List of shipwrecks: 23 August 1893
Ship	State	Description
Faragut	United States	The schooner was wrecked at Shag Harbour, Nova Scotia in a gale.
Pioneer	United States	The fishing schooner sank in a gale on the Georges Bank. Lost with all 12 crewmen.

=== 24 August ===
List of shipwrecks: 24 August 1893
Ship	State	Description
Ella M. Johnson	United States	1893 New York hurricane: The fishing schooner sank in the North Atlantic Ocean off Manasquan, New Jersey, with the loss of her entire crew of eight men.
Empire State	United States	1893 New York hurricane: The fishing schooner sank in the North Atlantic Ocean off Manasquan, New Jersey, with the loss of her entire crew of ten men.
Panther	United States	1893 New York hurricane: While towing barges, the 110-foot (33.5 m) iron-hulled steam tug sank with the loss of 17 lives in 56 feet (17 m) of water in the North Atlantic Ocean south of Long Island off Southampton, New York, during a storm.

=== Unknown date ===
List of shipwrecks: Unknown August 1893
Ship	State	Description
Horn Head	United Kingdom	The cargo ship went missing after passing Cape Henry on 20 August, or sunk by an iceberg, en route to Dublin, Ireland. 32 or 62 persons lost.
Pioneer	United States	The schooner left Gloucester, Massachusetts on 2 August for the Georges Bank and vanished. Believed to have sunk in a gale late in the month.

== September ==
=== 1 September ===
List of shipwrecks: 1 September 1893
Ship	State	Description
O. Wilcox	United States	The tug sprung a leak and sank 10 miles (16 km) above sable in 150 feet (46 m) of water. The crew made it to East Tawas, Michigan in her boat.

=== 5 September ===
List of shipwrecks: 7 September 1893
Ship	State	Description
Arctic	United States	The steam barge sprung a leak and sank off White Rock in Lake Huron.

=== 7 September ===
List of shipwrecks: 7 September 1893
Ship	State	Description
Gannet	United Kingdom	The 102-gross register ton steamer fishing trawler was wrecked in the Orkney Islands.
Rusalka	Imperial Russian Navy	The monitor foundered and sank in a storm in the Gulf of Finland with the loss of her entire crew of 177. Her wreck was discovered in July 2013 at 59°51′55″N 24°53′07″E.

=== 13 September ===
List of shipwrecks: 13 September 1893
Ship	State	Description
Byron Trerice	Canada	The passenger steamer burned to the waterline at Leamington, Ontario, a total loss. Two crewmen burned to death, the ship's female cook drowned.

=== 22 September ===
List of shipwrecks: 22 September 1893
Ship	State	Description
Lewis Wallace	United States	The 54-foot (16.5 m) steam tug burned and sank in a small bay at the west end of Portage Lake in Michigan.

=== 23 September ===
List of shipwrecks: 23 September 1893
Ship	State	Description
Albert Walter	United States	The 44-tons burden schooner drifted onto rocks several miles north-northeast of Kodiak, District of Alaska, and was abandoned by her crew of five.

=== 25 September ===
List of shipwrecks: 25 September 1893
Ship	State	Description
Adam M. Hall	United States	The schooner struck a rock, caught fire and burned off Scatterie Island. Crew saved.

=== 27 September ===
List of shipwrecks: 27 September 1893
Ship	State	Description
Mystic	United States	The tugboat burned at Ransom's Landing, Lake Superior.

=== 30 September ===
List of shipwrecks: 30 September 1893
Ship	State	Description
Margaret A. Muir	United States	The 130-foot (40 m) schooner foundered in a gale in Lake Michigan off Algoma, Wisconsin. The wreck was located in 2024.
Sassacus	United States	The scow schooner was beached in a gale on Lake Michigan two miles (3.2 km) north east of entrance to Sturgeon Bay.

== October ==
=== 6 October ===
List of shipwrecks: 6 October 1893
Ship	State	Description
David Stewart	United States	The schooner broke up and sank in Pigeon Bay in 30 feet (9.1 m) of water in a gale, a total loss. The crew were rescued by the fishing tug Louise (United States) after being in the rigging for 12 hours. Some equipment salvaged later in the month.

=== 13 October ===
List of shipwrecks: 13 October 1893
Ship	State	Description
Emily Schroeder	United States	The whaling and trading schooner dragged her anchor during a storm and was wrecked in Maryat Inlet (68°20′20″N 166°50′40″W) in Point Hope Lagoon near Point Hope on the coast of the District of Alaska. She became a total loss and was still visible hard aground in the inlet in 1896.
Ida M. Torrent	United States	The steamer burned to the waterline at Cross Village, Michigan.

=== 14 October ===
List of shipwrecks: 14 October 1893
Ship	State	Description
A. McVittie	United States	The Great Charleston Hurricane of 1893: The steamer went ashore on the west end of Beaver Island. Pulled off on 12 November.
Acme	United States	The Great Charleston Hurricane of 1893: The tug sank in Lake Huron in 225 feet (69 m) of water. The crew were rescued by the tug Reliance (United States.
Annie Sherwood	United States	The Great Charleston Hurricane of 1893: The schooner was lost on Lake Superior.
C. B. Benson	United States	The Great Charleston Hurricane of 1893: The schooner sank in Gravelly Bay, Lake Erie, off Long Point, Ontario in 80 feet (24 m) of water. Her crew of six, plus the captain's wife were all lost.
C. F. Curtis	United States	The Great Charleston Hurricane of 1893: The steamer was driven ashore at Cheboygan, Michigan. Later salvaged.
Castalia	United States	The Great Charleston Hurricane of 1893: The steamer went ashore at Sault Ste. Marie. The vessel was pulled off on 17 October.
City of Cleveland	United States	The Great Charleston Hurricane of 1893: The steam barge went ashore on Point Epaiffette near Summons' Reef, in Lake Michigan. Pulled off on 23 October and taken to St. Ignace, Michigan for repairs.
Conestoga	United States	The Great Charleston Hurricane of 1893: The steamer went ashore at the head of Lake St. Clair, eight miles (13 km) eastward of the cut, was pulled off the bottom by the tug Champion on 18 October and towed to Detroit, Michigan.
Crawford	United States	The Great Charleston Hurricane of 1893: The schooner went ashore on Bois Blanc Island, in the Straits of Mackinac.
Dean Richmond	United States	The Great Charleston Hurricane of 1893: The passenger/cargo steamer broke up and sank in Lake Erie off Dunkirk, New York. 17 of 18 crew died plus 3 would-be rescuers.
E. P. Curtis	United States	The Great Charleston Hurricane of 1893: The steamer went ashore at Cheboygan, Michigan.
Enterprise	United States	The Great Charleston Hurricane of 1893: The yacht was driven ashore at Lion's Head, Ontario, in Lion's Bay.
Evra Fuller	United States	The Great Charleston Hurricane of 1893: The schooner was lost on Lake Michigan.
Falconer	United States	The Great Charleston Hurricane of 1893: The schooner was driven ashore on Lake Ontario.
Hekla	United States	The Great Charleston Hurricane of 1893: The steam barge went ashore at Wellington, Ontario. Pulled off on 20 October and taken to Kingston, Ontario.
Ironton	United States	The Great Charleston Hurricane of 1893: The schooner barge was driven ashore in either Waiskai Bay, or Bay Mills, on Lake Superior. Refloated and returned to service.
Isabel Reid	United States	The Great Charleston Hurricane of 1893: The schooner was driven ashore at Cheboygan, Michigan.
J. C. Martin	United States	The Great Charleston Hurricane of 1893: The barge went ashore at Racine, Wisconsin.
James D. Sawyer	United States	The Great Charleston Hurricane of 1893: The schooner barge went on the rocks five miles (8.0 km) from Charlevoix, Michigan, a total wreck.
John B. Merrill	United States	The Great Charleston Hurricane of 1893: The schooner lost her towline, wrecked on Holdredge Shoal off Drummond Island in Lake Huron, and broke up the next day.
John T. Mott	United States	The Great Charleston Hurricane of 1893: The schooner was sunk between the piers at Fairport, Ohio.
Kershaw	United States	The Great Charleston Hurricane of 1893: The steamer was driven ashore in either Waiskai Bay, or Bay Mills, on Lake Superior. Later pulled off.
Knight Templar	United States	The Great Charleston Hurricane of 1893: The barge was driven ashore at Cheboygan, Michigan.
Minnehaha	United States	The Great Charleston Hurricane of 1893: The schooner was run aground in Lake Michigan after losing hatch covers in the storm and began filling. She was beached one-quarter mile (0.40 km) offshore between Burnham, Michigan and Arcadia, Michigan and broke up. Her captain survived, the other six crew, including the female cook, died.
Morton	United States	The Great Charleston Hurricane of 1893: The schooner went ashore at Sault Ste. Marie.
Mount Blanc	United States	The Great Charleston Hurricane of 1893: The schooner sank in the harbor at Cleveland, Ohio one hour after arriving with heavy damage from the storm and being towed in almost capsizing.
Nelson Holland	United States	The Great Charleston Hurricane of 1893: The schooner was driven ashore at Cheboygan, Michigan.
Riverside	United States	The Great Charleston Hurricane of 1893: The schooner sank in Lake Erie 30 miles (48 km) north east of Cleveland, Ohio. Lost with all seven hands, including her captain and his wife who was the cook. The wreck was located on 6 October 2007.
Sweepstakes	United States	The Great Charleston Hurricane of 1893: The barge was driven ashore at Cheboygan, Michigan.
T. S. Fassett	United States	The Great Charleston Hurricane of 1893: The sailing vessel went ashore in Lake Huron near Cheboygan, Michigan.
Volunteer	United States	The Great Charleston Hurricane of 1893: The schooner was driven ashore at Port Austen, Ontario.
Whittaker	United States	The Great Charleston Hurricane of 1893: The steamer went ashore at Long Point, Ontario. Pulled off on 17 October.
Wocoken	United States	The Great Charleston Hurricane of 1893: The steam barge sank in Lake Erie in eight fathoms (48 ft; 15 m) of water. Lost with 14 hands, including her captain. Three survivors lashed themselves in her rigging and were saved by the United States Life Saving Service 17 hours later. Her engine, boilers and machinery were salvaged in September 1894.
Yukon	United States	The Great Charleston Hurricane of 1893: The schooner was driven ashore in either Waiskai Bay, or Bay Mills, on Lake Superior.

=== 16 October ===
List of shipwrecks: 16 October 1893
Ship	State	Description
Levi Rawson	United States	The Great Charleston Hurricane of 1893: The barge sank at Kelly's Island.

=== 21 October ===
List of shipwrecks: 21 October 1893
Ship	State	Description
Charles S. Tappan	United States	The schooner was wrecked at Little Glace Bay, Nova Scotia. Crew saved.
Henry Friend	United States	The schooner was wrecked on Shovelful shoal. Crew saved.

=== 24 October ===
List of shipwrecks: 24 October 1893
Ship	State	Description
George	United States	The schooner went aground in Lake Superior 30 yards (27 m) offshore from Mosquito Beach near Pictured Rocks in a snowstorm and broke up in 15 feet (4.6 m) of water. Her crew survived.

=== 25 October ===
List of shipwrecks: 25 October 1893
Ship	State	Description
Pallas	Brazil	The 220.1-foot (67.1 m) passenger/cargo ship, operated by rebels in the 2nd naval mutiny, was wrecked in Itajai (Santa Catarina, Brazil) at the mouth of the Itajaí-Açu River. Scheduled to be removed for harbor improvements in 2026.

== November ==
=== 3 November ===
List of shipwrecks: 3 November 1893
Ship	State	Description
Cabo Machichaco	Spain	Cabo Machichaco Dynamite in the steamship's cargo caught fire as she was being unloaded in Santander. A large crowd gathered on the waterfront to watch. The cargo exploded, destroying the ship, killing 590 people and injuring up to 2,000.
M. R. Warner	United States	The schooner barge, under tow of Superior, had her towline cut or parted in heavy weather. She drifted ashore on Sand Island and broke up. Some of her cargo of lumber was salvaged. No casualties.

=== 6 November ===
List of shipwrecks: 6 November 1893
Ship	State	Description
Yukon	United States	The steamer was wrecked at Juneau, District of Alaska, during a storm.

=== 7 November ===
List of shipwrecks: 7 November 1893
Ship	State	Description
Albany	United States	The cargo ship was sunk in a collision in fog off Point aux Barques 17 miles (27 km) north of Sand Beach in Lake Huron with Philadelphia (United States). Philadelphia rescued her crew but soon sank also. One lifeboat made it to shore, the other with 24 men from both crews capsized and all were lost.
John B. Frazer	Canada	The steamer burned near Goose Island on Lake Nipissing. 7 survived, 18, including her captain, died. The wreck was located in 1972.
Philadelphia	United States	The freighter was damaged in a collision in fog with Albany (United States) off Point aux Barques 17 miles (27 km) north of Sand Beach in Lake Huron. She towed Albany for a half hour until Albany sank. She rescued Albany's crew, before sinking also a half hour later in 200 feet (61 m) of water. One lifeboat made it to shore, the other with 24 men from both crews capsized and all were lost.

=== 11 November ===
List of shipwrecks: 11 November 1893
Ship	State	Description
C. B. Lockwood	United States	The steamer was sunk in a collision with Elizabeth A. Nicholson (flag unknown) at Lime-Kiln Crossing in the Detroit River off Amherstburg, Ontario. Raised, repaired and returned to service in 1894.
Thomas H. Smith	United States	The freighter/steam barge/tug was sunk in a collision with Arthur Orr (flag unknown) in dense fog off Racine, Wisconsin. As she sank the cold water caused her boilers to explode. Her crew was rescued by Arthur Orr.

=== 17 November ===
List of shipwrecks: 17 November 1893
Ship	State	Description
Favourite	United Kingdom	The ketch foundered in the Bristol Channel 3 nautical miles (5.6 km) off Worms Head, Glamorgan. Her crew were rescued.
Lowell	United States	The steam barge burned at St. Clair, Michigan.

=== 18 November ===
List of shipwrecks: 18 November 1893
Ship	State	Description
Bessie	United Kingdom	The collier was wrecked on Carbis Bay beach, Cornwall.
Cintra	United Kingdom	The steamship was driven ashore and wrecked at Carbis Bay, in St Ives Bay, with the loss of seven of her twelve crew. She was on a voyage from Newport, Monmouthshire to Dartmouth, Devon. One of her anchors was recovered in 1959 and can be seen on Smeaton's Pier, St Ives.
Hampshire	United Kingdom	The vessel sank in St Ives Bay with the loss of all hands.
Rosedale	United Kingdom	The vessel was washed ashore at Porthminster beach, St Ives, Cornwall.
Vulture	United Kingdom	The collier was stranded on Carbis Bay beach. The boilers were taken for scrap during World War II.

=== 22 November ===
List of shipwrecks: 22 November 1893
Ship	State	Description
Javary	Imperial Brazilian Navy	Revolta da Armada: The monitor was sunk by coastal artillery in the harbor at Rio de Janeiro, Brazil.

=== 24 November ===
List of shipwrecks: 24 November 1893
Ship	State	Description
Gosford	United Kingdom	Gosford Carrying a cargo of coal that had been burning since 18 November, the four-masted sailing ship sank in 35 to 40 feet (11 to 12 m) of water while anchored at Cojo Anchorage on the Central Coast of California, 1.5 miles (2.4 km) east of Point Conception.
Serica	United Kingdom	The steamer nearly foundered and took shelter in St Mary's Roads on 19 November. As she left on 24 November she struck an uncharted rock (later named Serica Rock) and sank.

== December ==
=== 3 December ===
List of shipwrecks: 3 December 1893
Ship	State	Description
F. W. Wheeler	United States	The cargo ship was wrecked in a blizzard three miles (4.8 km) from Michigan City, Indiana, a total loss.
W. R. Crowell	United States	The tug foundered in Lake Michigan six miles (9.7 km) off the Indiana shore in 50 feet (15 m) of water while going to the assistance of F. W. Wheeler.

=== 5 December ===
List of shipwrecks: 5 December 1893
Ship	State	Description
Waldo A. Avery	United States	The freighter caught fire in the Straits of Mackinac and was run aground off McGulpin Point Light west of Mackinaw City. She burned to the waterline and sank. Refloated and taken to Bay City, Michigan in 1894. She was rebuilt in 1895 and returned to service as Phenix. No casualties.

=== 8 December ===
List of shipwrecks: 8 December 1893
Ship	State	Description
Princesse Louise	Belgium	The steamer became stranded in the River Scheldt at Saaftingen and broke in two.

=== 12 December ===
List of shipwrecks: 12 December 1893
Ship	State	Description
Eliza R.	United States	The schooner was wrecked in the Hound Cross Islands, near Lunenburg, Nova Scotia. Crew saved.
Senator Lodge	United States	The schooner was wrecked at Port Nova. Crew saved.

=== 13 December ===
List of shipwrecks: 13 December 1893
Ship	State	Description
Althea	Norway	The barque was driven ashore and wrecked in Oxwich Bay. Her ten crew were rescued by the Port Eynon Lifeboat.

=== 16 December ===
List of shipwrecks: 16 December 1893
Ship	State	Description
Sete de Setembro	Imperial Brazilian Navy	The armored frigate burned and sank at Rio de Janeiro, Brazil.

=== 20 December ===
List of shipwrecks: 20 December 1893
Ship	State	Description
Danforth	United States	The schooner went ashore four miles (6.4 km) north of Chicago, Illinois, in gale, later breaking up.
Iota	Italy	The barque sank off the coast of Cornwall at Tintagel with the loss of three lives.
Star of the East	United States	The schooner was abandoned on Cashes Bank after losing her rudder and springing a leak. Her crew were taken off by the schooner Volunteer (United States).

=== 28 December ===
List of shipwrecks: 28 December 1893
Ship	State	Description
Alert	Victoria	The steamer sank off Cape Schanck, Australia, with the loss of 15 lives and one survivor.

== Unknown date ==
List of shipwrecks: Unknown date 1893
Ship	State	Description
Hattie L. Newman	United States	The fishing schooner was wrecked at Lower English, Nova Scotia in Fortune Bay sometime in December. Crew saved.
Vizcaya	United Kingdom	The ship was wrecked on the coast of Yorkshire.
Woolton	United Kingdom	The full-rigged ship sailed from Newcastle, New South Wales for Valparaíso, Chile, on 14 June 1893 with a cargo of coal and tallow, but never arrived.
