= Ryerson (disambiguation) =

Ryerson is a surname.

Ryerson may also refer to:

== Place ==
- Ryerson, Ontario, Canada; a township in Parry Sound District
- Ryerson, Algoma District, Ontario, Canada; an unincorporated place
- Ryerson, Saskatchewan, Canada; an unincorporated place in Maryfield Rural Municipality
- Ryerson's Island, Ontario, Canada; an island in Lake Erie
- Edward L. Ryerson Conservation Area, Riverwoods, Illinois, USA
- Ryerson Station State Park, Richhill Township, Greene County, Pennsylvania, USA

=== Facilities and structures ===
- Ryerson Physical Laboratory, University of Chicago, Chicago, Illinois, USA
- Ryerson Library, the older wing of the main public library in Grand Rapids, Michigan, United States
- Martin Ryerson Tomb (Ryerson Tomb), Graceland Cemetery, Chicago, Illinois, USA

== Other ==
- Ryerson, Inc., a metals distributor
- Ryerson Press, Canadian book publisher
- Ryerson Fiction Award, a Canadian literary award
- Ryerson Radio of Ryerson University
- Ryerson University, formerly Ryerson Polytechnic a public university in Toronto, Canada; that was renamed to Toronto Metropolitan University in 2022
- SS Edward L. Ryerson (aka SS Ryerson), a U.S. Great Lakes freighter
