= Copious =

Copious means vast in quantity or number, profuse, abundant; taking place on a large scale.

Copious may also refer to:

- Copious, a Scottish fishing vessel that in 2006 and 2012 found two of the world's oldest messages in a bottle
- Copious, a British ship that struck a mine and sank on November 3, 1914
- Copious, a type of speech that is purposely redundant
