= Second Island (Lake Erie) =

Canadian island in Lake Erie

- Interactive map of Second Island

Geography
- Location: Lake Erie
- Coordinates: 42.589883°N 80.270843°W
- Archipelago: Long Point

Administration
- Canada
- Province: Ontario
- County: Norfolk

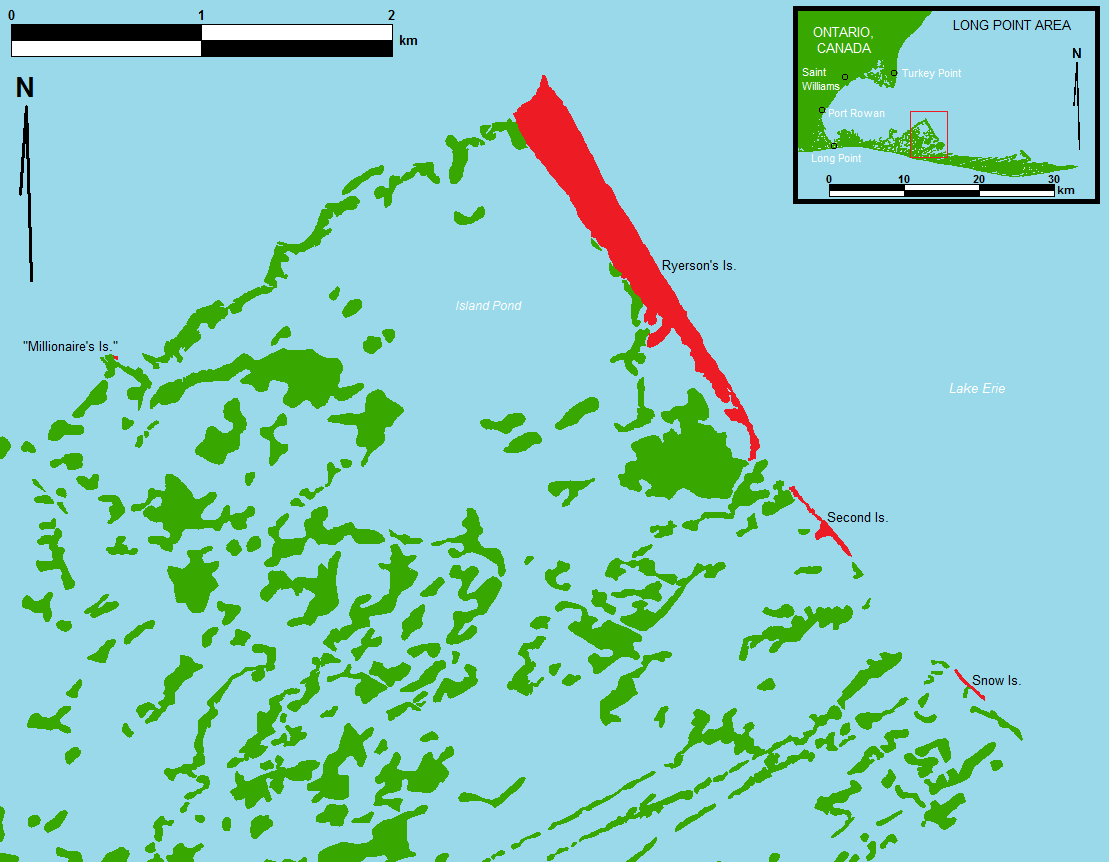
The location of Second Island, between Ryerson's Island and Snow Island

Second Island is an island in Ontario, Canada, located in Lake Erie north of Long Point. The island was never inhabited, and is located between Ryerson's Island and Snow Island, which together with Second Island are three of the more notable islands near Long Point.
