= Ryerson =

Ryerson is an Anglicised American surname. It can also be an anglicized spelling of Scandinavian surnames. Originating from Dutch meaning "the son of Ryerse(n), Reyer or Reijer (rider)", the Swedish "Reierson", or Norwegian and Danish's "Reiersen".

Notable people with the surname include:

- Ali Ryerson (born 1952), flutist
- Art Ryerson (1913–2004), American jazz guitarist
- Egerton Ryerson (1803–1882), Educator and politician in early Ontario, Ryerson University named after him
- Emily Ryerson (1863–1939), American survivor of the sinking of RMS Titanic
- Florence Ryerson (1892–1965), American playwright and screenwriter
- Frank L. Ryerson (1905–1995), American trumpeter, composer, arranger and educator
- Gary Ryerson (born 1948), American baseball player
- George Ryerson (1855–1925), Ontario physician, businessman and politician
- John K. Ryerson (1820–1890), Canadian merchant and politician
- Julian Ryerson (born 1997), Norwegian football player
- Lisa Marsh Ryerson, American academic administrator
- Martin A. Ryerson (1856–1932), American businessman, philanthropist.
- Rich Ryerson, American soccer player-coach
- Rob Ryerson (born 1964), U.S. soccer player and coach
- Robert Edwy Ryerson (1865–1958), Canadian politician
- Stanley Bréhaut Ryerson (1911–1998), Canadian historian, educator and political activist
- William Ryerson (1797–1872), Canadian politician and Methodist minister

== Fictional ==
- Ned Ryerson, character in Groundhog Day
- Sandy Ryerson, character in Glee
- Phil Ryerson, Jeff Garlin character in Daddy Day Care
- Max Ryerson, Max Burkholder character in Daddy Day Care (son of Phil)
- Mike Ryerson, Geoffrey Lewis/Christopher Morris character in Salem's Lot (1979)/Salem's Lot (2004)
- Ginny Ryerson, Anna Kendrick character in Rocket Science
- Spike Ryerson, James Drury character in Firehouse

Notable people with the given name include:

- Ryerson Edgar (born 2009), Canadian ice hockey player
