= List of shipwrecks in November 1914 =

The list of shipwrecks in November 1914 includes ships sunk, foundered, grounded, or otherwise lost during November 1914.

== 1 November ==
List of shipwrecks: 1 November 1914
| Ship | State | Description |
|---|---|---|
| SS Frederica | United Kingdom | World War I: The cargo ship was shelled and set afire at Novorossiysk, Russia by Hamidiye (Ottoman Navy). She was consequently scuttled. |
| HMS Good Hope | Royal Navy | World War I: Battle of Coronel: The Drake-class cruiser was shelled and sunk in the Pacific Ocean off the coast of Chile by SMS Scharnhorst (Imperial German Navy) with the loss of all 900 crew. |
| HMS Monmouth | Royal Navy | World War I: Battle of Coronel: The Monmouth-class cruiser was shelled and sunk in the Pacific Ocean off the coast of Chile by SMS Gneisenau and SMS Nürnberg (both Imperial German Navy) with the loss of all 678 crew. |

== 2 November ==
List of shipwrecks: 2 November 1914
| Ship | State | Description |
|---|---|---|
| SMS Kaiserin Elisabeth | Austro-Hungarian Navy | World War I: The Kaiser Franz Joseph I-class cruiser was scuttled at Qingdao, China. |
| Van Dyck | United Kingdom | World War I: The refrigerated cargo liner was scuttled in the Atlantic Ocean (approximately 1°S 4°W) by SMS Karlsruhe (Imperial German Navy). Her crew were taken as prisoners of war. |

== 3 November ==
List of shipwrecks: 3 November 1914
| Ship | State | Description |
|---|---|---|
| SMS Augustenburg | Imperial German Navy | The Vorpostenboot was lost on this date. |
| Copious | United Kingdom | World War I: The drifter struck a mine and sank in the North Sea off Great Yarmouth, Norfolk with the loss of nine of her ten crew. |
| HMS D5 | Royal Navy | World War I: The D-class submarine struck a mine and sank in the North Sea off Great Yarmouth with the loss of twenty of her 25 crew. |
| Fraternal | United Kingdom | World War I: The drifter struck a mine and sank in the North Sea off Great Yarmouth with the loss of six of her ten crew. |
| HMT Ivanhoe | Royal Navy | The naval trawler ran aground and was wrecked off Leith, Lothian. |
| Will and Maggie | United Kingdom | World War I: The trawler struck a mine and sank in the North Sea 17 nautical miles (31 km) north east by north of Lowestoft, Suffolk with the loss of three of her crew. |

== 4 November ==
List of shipwrecks: 4 November 1914
| Ship | State | Description |
|---|---|---|
| HMS Hood | Royal Navy | World War I: The Royal Sovereign-class battleship was sunk as a blockship in Portland Harbour, Dorset. |
| SMS Karlsruhe | Imperial German Navy | The Karlsruhe-class cruiser suffered an internal explosion (own ammunition) and sank in the Atlantic Ocean (11°07′N 55°25′W) with the loss of 133 of her 373 crew. Survivors were rescued by Rio Negro (Imperial German Navy). |
| SMS Yorck | Imperial German Navy | World War I: The Roon-class cruiser struck a mine in the North Sea off Wilhelmshaven, Lower Saxony and sank with the loss of 336 of her 629 crew. |

== 5 November ==
List of shipwrecks: 5 November 1914
| Ship | State | Description |
|---|---|---|
| HMT Mary | Royal Navy | World War I: The naval trawler struck a mine placed by the minelayer SMS Kolberg (Imperial German Navy) and sank in the North Sea off Cromer, Norfolk with the loss of eight of her fourteen crew. Survivors were rescued by HMT Columbia and HMT Driversunk (both Royal Navy). |

== 6 November ==
List of shipwrecks: 6 November 1914
| Ship | State | Description |
|---|---|---|
| SMS T25 | Imperial German Navy | The S7-class torpedo boat collided with SMS T72 (Imperial German Navy) and sank in the North Sea. |
| SMS S13 | Imperial German Navy | The S13-class torpedo boat was destroyed by explosion of her own torpedoes in the North Sea. |

== 7 November ==
List of shipwrecks: 7 November 1914
| Ship | State | Description |
|---|---|---|
| SMS Jaguar | Imperial German Navy | World War I: Siege of Qingdao: The Iltis-class gunboat was scuttled at Qingdao. |
| No. 1 | Ottoman Navy | The No. 1-class motor gunboat was lost on this date. |

== 8 November ==
List of shipwrecks: 8 November 1914
| Ship | State | Description |
|---|---|---|
| Atle | Sweden | World War I: The steamer, enroute from London to Gothenburg, struck a mine in the North Sea and sank with the loss of six of her crew. |
| Oscoda | United States | The lumber steamer was wrecked on Pelkies Reef in Lake Michigan in a severe snowstorm and sank. The crew transferred to a barge she was towing and to shore the next morning. |

== 9 November ==
List of shipwrecks: 9 November 1914
| Ship | State | Description |
|---|---|---|
| SMS Emden | Imperial German Navy | SMS Emden World War I: Battle of Cocos: The Dresden-class cruiser was shelled and damaged in the Indian Ocean by HMAS Sydney (Royal Australian Navy). She was beached on North Keeling Island with the loss of 134 of her 360 crew. |
| No. 2 | Ottoman Navy | The No. 1-class motor gunboat was lost on this date. |

== 10 November ==
List of shipwrecks: 10 November 1914
| Ship | State | Description |
|---|---|---|
| Speculator | United Kingdom | World War I: The fishing smack struck a mine and sank in the North Sea off the coast of Norfolk with the loss of five of her crew. |

== 11 November ==
List of shipwrecks: 11 November 1914
| Ship | State | Description |
|---|---|---|
| HMS Niger | Royal Navy | World War I: The minesweeper was torpedoed and sunk in the English Channel off Deal, Kent by SM U-12 (Imperial German Navy) with the loss of a crew member. |

== 12 November ==
List of shipwrecks: 12 November 1914
| Ship | State | Description |
|---|---|---|
| Andrei Pervozvanny | Imperial Russian Navy | The Andrei Pervozvanny-class battleship ran aground in the Longgayen Pass. She was refloated on 14 November. |
| Duchesse de Guiche | France | The coaster foundered in the English Channel off Le Havre, Seine-Inférieure with the loss of eleven of her crew. |

== 13 November ==
List of shipwrecks: 13 November 1914
| Ship | State | Description |
|---|---|---|
| Doris | United Kingdom | The 80-foot (24 m), 79-ton steam drifter was wrecked at Ardwell Point, the Rinns of Galloway, and located in 1975 in 15 fathoms of water off Doon Castle Point. Lost with 3 hands, Skipper survived. |

== 15 November ==
List of shipwrecks: 15 November 1914
| Ship | State | Description |
|---|---|---|
| Kenilworth | United Kingdom | The cargo ship ran aground on the Black Middens, in the North Sea off the coast of Northumberland. Her crew were taken off by lifeboats. |
| Vera | United Kingdom | Vera The ship collided with another vessel and sank off Cley-next-the-Sea, Norfolk. |

== 16 November ==
List of shipwrecks: 16 November 1914
| Ship | State | Description |
|---|---|---|
| Andrea | Sweden | World War I: The steamer, en route from Helsingborg to Hull, struck a mine in the North Sea and sank. Her crew survived. |
| Dirigo | United States | While under tow by the vessel Cordova (United States), the 823- or 843-gross register ton, 165-foot (50.3 m) steam passenger schooner sank off Cape Spencer in the Alexander Archipelago in Southeast Alaska. Cordova rescued her crew of 13. |
| North Wales | United Kingdom | World War I: The cargo ship was scuttled in the Pacific Ocean 360 nautical miles (670 km) south west of Valparaíso, Chile by SMS Dresden (Imperial German Navy). |

== 17 November ==
List of shipwrecks: 17 November 1914
| Ship | State | Description |
|---|---|---|
| SMS Friedrich Carl | Imperial German Navy | World War I: The Prinz Adalbert-class cruiser struck a mine in the Baltic Sea off Memel, East Prussia and sank with the loss of eight of her 586 crew. |
| Mateus | Russia | The schooner foundered in the Bay of Biscay. Her crew were rescued by Diciembre (Spain). |

== 18 November ==
List of shipwrecks: 18 November 1914
| Ship | State | Description |
|---|---|---|
| Dirigo | United States | The coaster foundered in the Pacific Ocean. |
| Petrel | United Kingdom | The schooner foundered at Castletown, Isle of Man. Her crew were rescued. |
| Seymolicus | United Kingdom | World War I: The trawler struck a mine and sank in the North Sea off the coast of Norfolk with the loss of nine of her crew. |
| Thistle | United Kingdom | The cargo liner ran aground in the River Foyle, County Londonderry. Her passengers were taken off. She was refloated the next day. |

== 19 November ==
List of shipwrecks: 19 November 1914
| Ship | State | Description |
|---|---|---|
| Annie M. Peterson | United States | The schooner sank in a gale in Lake Superior off Grand Marais, Michigan after her tow vessel, C. F. Curtis (United States), sank. Nine crew were killed. |
| C. F. Curtis | United States | The cargo ship sank in a gale in Lake Superior off Grand Marais, Michigan. 12 crew were killed. |
| Madeira | United Kingdom | The cargo ship foundered in the Bay of Biscay 30 nautical miles (56 km) off Brest, Finistère, France. Her crew was rescued by Mars (Norway). |
| Matthew S. Greer | United States | The schooner went ashore at Provincetown, Massachusetts. |
| Natalie J. Nelson | United States | The schooner went ashore at Provincetown, Massachusetts. Floated off on her own. |
| Nilufer | Ottoman Navy | World War I: The auxiliary minelayer was sunk by mines in the Bosporus. |
| No. 6 | Ottoman Navy | The No. 1-class motor gunboat was lost on this date. |
| Rebecca | United States | The schooner went ashore at Provincetown, Massachusetts. |
| Selden E. Marvin | United States | The schooner sank in a gale in Lake Superior off Grand Marais, Michigan after her tow vessel, C. F. Curtis (United States), sank. Six crew were killed. |
| SMS Titania | Imperial German Navy | World War I: The supply ship was scuttled in the Pacific Ocean to prevent capture in 95 metres (312 ft) of water, about 4.25 nautical miles (7.87 km; 4.89 mi) off the northwest coast of Alejandro Selkirk Island, Chile. The wreck was located on 14 October 2024. |

== 20 November ==
List of shipwrecks: 20 November 1914
| Ship | State | Description |
|---|---|---|
| Lord Carnarvon | United Kingdom | World War I: The trawler struck a mine placed by the cruiser SMS Stralsund (Imperial German Navy) and sank in the North Sea off Great Yarmouth, Norfolk with the loss of ten of her crew. |
| Teddy | United States | During a voyage in the Territory of Alaska from Sulzer to Ketchikan with two people but no cargo aboard, the 12-gross register ton, 38.5-foot (11.7 m) motor vessel sank in the upper portion of Nichols Bay (54°41′30″N 132°04′45″W) in Southeast Alaska after she drifted onto a reef during a gale and snowstorm. Both people on board survived. |

== 21 November ==
List of shipwrecks: 21 November 1914
| Ship | State | Description |
|---|---|---|
| HMT Spider | Royal Navy | The naval trawler was driven ashore at Lowestoft, Suffolk and was wrecked. All thirteen crew were rescued by the lifeboat Kentwell ( Royal National Lifeboat Institution). |

== 22 November ==
List of shipwrecks: 22 November 1914
| Ship | State | Description |
|---|---|---|
| HMT Condor | Royal Navy | World War I: The naval trawler struck a mine and sank in the North Sea. |
| Nilufer | Ottoman Navy | World War I: The vessel was sunk by a Bulgarian mine in the Black Sea near Rila. |

== 23 November ==
List of shipwrecks: 23 November 1914
| Ship | State | Description |
|---|---|---|
| Malachite | United Kingdom | World War I: The coaster was shelled and sunk in the English Channel 4 nautical miles (7.4 km) north by west of Cap de la Heve, Seine-Inférieure, France by SM U-21 (Imperial German Navy). Her crew survived. |
| Ormesby | Russia | The cargo ship was wrecked on the Orlow Banks. |
| SMS S124 | Imperial German Navy | World War I: The destroyer was rammed and damaged in the North Sea by Anglo-Dane (United Kingdom) and was consequently beached on the Swedish coast. |
| SM U-18 | Imperial German Navy | World War I: The Type U 17 submarine was rammed in Hoxa Sound (58°41′N 2°55′W) by HMT Dorothy Grey (Royal Navy) and was consequently scuttled due to damage received with the loss of one of her 25 crew. |

== 24 November ==
List of shipwrecks: 24 November 1914
| Ship | State | Description |
|---|---|---|
| Hanalei | United States | The steamer ran aground on Duxbury Reef opposite the Marconi Wireless Station in Bolinas, California in thick fog on 23 November. She broke up after 18 hours on the rocks, 23 passengers and crew were killed. |

== 25 November ==
List of shipwrecks: 25 November 1914
| Ship | State | Description |
|---|---|---|
| HMS D2 | Royal Navy | World War I: The D-class submarine was rammed and sunk by a German patrol boat off Borkum, Denmark with the loss of all 25 crew. |
| Nygaard | Norway | The cargo ship ran aground at Esbjerg, Denmark. She sank on or about 6 December. |

== 26 November ==
List of shipwrecks: 26 November 1914
| Ship | State | Description |
|---|---|---|
| HMS Bulwark | Royal Navy | HMS Bulwark The Formidable-class battleship was sunk in the River Medway off Sheerness, Kent by an internal explosion (own ammunition) with the loss of 738 of her 750 crew. |
| Primo | United Kingdom | World War I: The cargo ship was shelled and sunk in the English Channel six nautical miles (11 km) north west by north of Cap d'Antifer, Seine-Inférieure, France by SM U-21 (Imperial German Navy). Her crew survived. |

== 27 November ==
List of shipwrecks: 27 November 1914
| Ship | State | Description |
|---|---|---|
| Khartoum | United Kingdom | World War I: The cargo ship struck a mine and sank in the North Sea 20 nautical miles (37 km) east south east of Spurn Point, Yorkshire. |

== 29 November ==
List of shipwrecks: 29 November 1914
| Ship | State | Description |
|---|---|---|
| Albany | Germany | The cargo ship was destroyed by fire at Syracuse, Sicily, Italy. |

== 30 November ==
List of shipwrecks: 30 November 1914
| Ship | State | Description |
|---|---|---|
| Pontos | Royal Navy | World War I: The Admiralty-purchased cargo ship was scuttled in Water Sound between South Ronaldshay Island and Burray Island, Scapa Flow (58°50′N 02°54′W) as a blockship. Partially scrapped later. |
| SMS S124 | Imperial German Navy | The S90-class torpedo boat collided with Anglodane (Denmark) and sank in the Baltic Sea with the loss of a crew member. |
| Trilby | United States | During a voyage in the Aleutian Islands from Unalaska to Attu Island, the 12-gross register ton, 51.5-foot (15.7 m) schooner was wrecked on a beach in the Semichi Islands. Her two-man crew survived. |

== Unknown date ==
List of shipwrecks: Unknown date 1914
| Ship | State | Description |
|---|---|---|
| Buresk | Imperial German Navy | World War I: The captured British cargo ship, in use as a prison ship and collier after her capture by SMS Emden (Imperial German Navy), was captured by the light cruiser HMAS Sydney (Royal Australian Navy) in the Indian Ocean off the Cocos (Keeling) Islands. After Buresk's crew unsuccessfully attempted to scuttle her, Sydney sank her with gunfire. |
| Elim | Norway | The barque was abandoned in the Atlantic Ocean some time after 17 November. She was reported derelict on 25 November at 42°46′N 10°28′W). |
| Weimar | United Kingdom | The cargo ship ran aground on Hitra in Sør-Trøndelag, Norway on or before 16 November. She was refloated on 25 November. |
