= Snow Island (Ontario) =

Island in Lake Erie, Ontario, Canada

- Interactive map of Snow Island

Geography
- Location: Lake Erie
- Coordinates: 42.579731°N 80.259129°W
- Archipelago: Long Point

Administration
- Canada
- Province: Ontario
- County: Norfolk

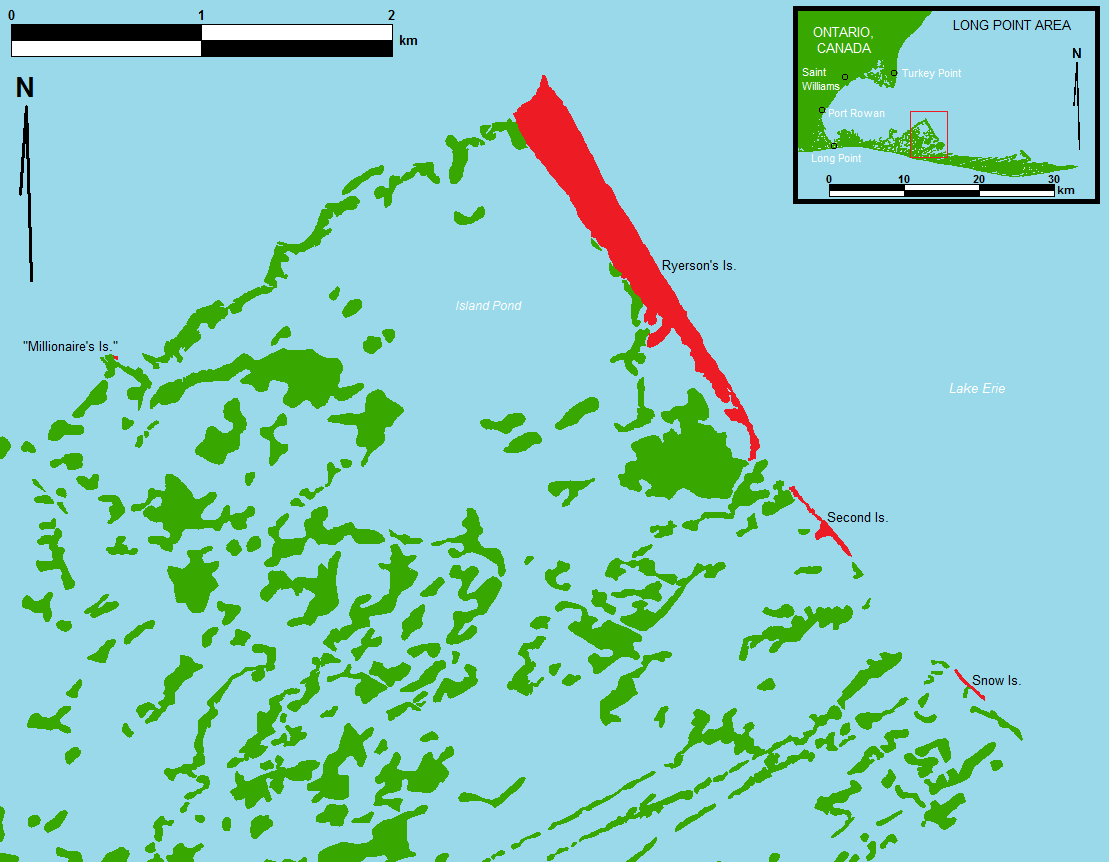
The location of Snow Island, bottom-right corner of the map

Snow Island is an island in Ontario, Canada, located in Lake Erie north of Long Point. The island has never been inhabited, and is located southeast of both Ryerson's Island and Second Island, which together with Snow Island are three of the more notable islands near Long Point.
