= James Ajetance =

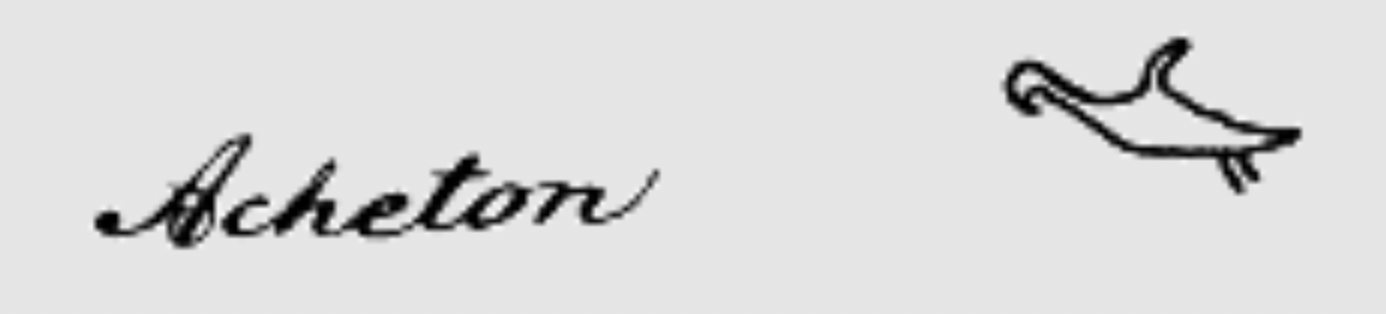
- Ajetance's signature, from the text of the Toronto Purchase.
- Born: c. 1770; Ontario, Canada
- Died: March 11, 1829; Credit Mission, Ontario, Canada
- Other names: Acheton, Adjutant, Captain Jim

Chief James Ajetance (also recorded as Acheton, Adjutant, Agetauns, or Captain Jim) (c. 1770–March 11, 1829), was a 19th-century chief of the Mississauga Ojibwe. He served as head chief of the Mississaugas of the Credit from 1810 to 1829, proceeded by Chechalk and succeeded by Nawahjegezhegwabe (Joseph Sawyer).

== Life ==
Ajetance was the second Mississauga chief to convert to Christianity, after John Cameron. He held his leadership role during a transformative time for the Mississauga during and after the War of 1812, when most of their land was sold to the Colonial Government and the Credit Mission was established. Ajetance was a signatory of major land treaties, including the Toronto Purchase (Treaty 13) and the Ajetance Treaty (Treaty 19), which colloquially bears his name.

Following the death of his son, Ajetance adopted Peter Jones and gave him the same name as his deceased son, Kahkewaquonaby (Sacred Feathers). In 1826, he also gave the name of the deceased chief Chechalk to Methodist missionary Egerton Ryerson, who lived and worked with them at the Credit Mission.

Ajetance negotiated for land rights for his people, but was often faced with few options. On one occasion, at the Fort York council, an Indian Agent told Ajetance that the Credit Mission had no legal title to their lands, other than a 200-acre lot along the Credit River.

He died on March 11, 1829, and was buried beside fellow chief John Cameron at the Credit Mission.
