= William Ryerson =

Canadian politician and clergyman (1797–1872)

William Ryerson (31 March 1797 – 15 September 1872) was a Methodist minister and political figure in Canada West.

He was born in Maugerville, New Brunswick in 1797 and grew up in Norfolk County in Upper Canada. Ryerson served with his father Joseph Ryerson as a volunteer during the War of 1812. He converted to Methodism after the war and left home, settling in Oxford County. In 1823, he was assigned to the Niagara circuit, where he rode alongside Ezra Adams. The pair oversaw increase in church membership of seven, including Henry Wilkinson of St. Catharines. Ryerson was ordained a deacon in 1825. In 1829, he was involved in establishing a separate Canadian church and helped send his brother Egerton to England to attempt to unite the Canadian church with the British Wesleyan Methodist Church. When this failed, in 1840, William became the first president of the Wesleyan Methodist Church in Canada; he was reelected in 1847, but gave up this position when the Canadian church reunited with the British church later that year. He was active in attempting to establish missions and schools for native people. In 1830, with his brother John, Ryerson was a member of committee to establish the Upper Canada Academy, which later became Victoria College. He served with the militia that put down the Upper Canada Rebellion, but also pleaded against the death penalty for the rebel leaders. In 1861, he was elected in West Brant but he was defeated in 1863 and retired from politics.

Ryerson died on his farm near Brantford in 1872.
