= Chechalk =

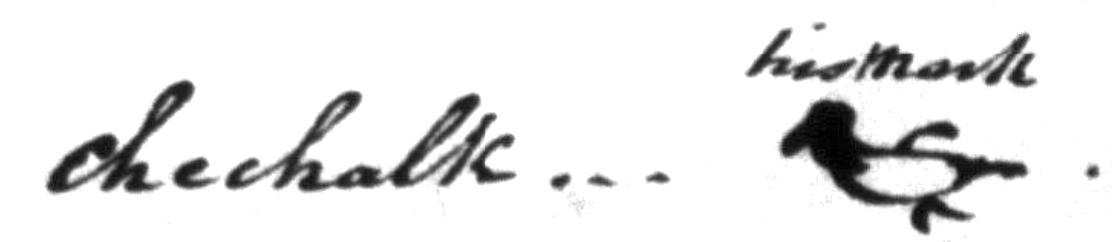
- Chechalk's signature, from the text of the Toronto Purchase.
- Born: c. 1770; Ontario, Canada
- Died: 1810; Ontario, Canada
- Other names: Chechock, Cheechock, Chehalk

Chief Chechalk (also recorded as Chechock, Cheechock, and Chehalk) (c. 1770–1810), was a 19th-century chief of the Mississauga Ojibwe. He was the head chief of the Mississaugas of the Credit from 1805 to 1810, proceeded by Wabanip and succeeded by James Ajetance.

== Life ==
Chechalk was one of the last Credit River chiefs to not convert to Christianity, dying before the arrival of the Methodist missionaries. He was a signatory on the Toronto Purchase (Treaty 13) and the Head of the Lake Treaty (Treaty 14), major land surrenders by the Mississaugas to the Colonial Government. He was vocal against the encroachment of his people's lands, telling the British in 1800 that their hunting grounds were "becoming confined and not fit for hunting."

Chechalk was a member of the Eagle clan, and his name is often translated as "crane" (Ajijaak) or "bird on the wing". The latter is an interpretation by Egerton Ryerson when the name was bestowed upon him by Ajetance at a council meeting in 1826.

His descendants continued to be band leaders, including his son James Chechalk (Manoonooding) who married Peter Jones's sister Catherine, along with his grandson John Chechalk. Some sources claim that Chechalk or his son James served in the War of 1812, but this is unlikely given their dates of birth and death.

== Legacy ==
Chechalk Trail in Mississauga is named in his honour.
