= Woolton (ship) =

Several vessels have been named Woolton for Woolton, or Woolton Hall:

- Woolton (1774 ship), was launched at King's Lynn in 1773 as Narr. By 1775 she was sailing between London and Liverpool as Woolton. A French privateer captured and ransomed her in September 1779. In 1781 she sailed briefly as a privateer and made one notable capture that involved a single ship action. After the war Woolton continued to trade primarily between London and Liverpool until she was wrecked in 1785.
- Woolton (1786 ship) was launched in 1786 at Liverpool. She spent her brief career sailing between Liverpool and London until she was wrecked in 1791 at the outset of a voyage to Virginia.
- Woolton (1804 ship) was a French vessel launched in the East Indies in 1788 under another name and taken in prize in 1803. In 1804 Woolton became a Liverpool-based slave ship in the triangular trade in enslaved people. She made one complete slave voyage and was wrecked as she was almost home from her second slave voyage.
- Woolton (1863 ship), a snow, later a schooner, of 284 tons (bm), was built by James Hardie and launched at Southwick, Sunderland in 1863. She was wrecked near Den Helder, Netherlands on 8 March 1907 with loss of all the crew.
- Woolton (1885 ship), an iron full-rigged ship of 2,152 GRT, was built by Oswald, Mordaunt & Co., and launched at Woolston, Southampton in 1885 for Frederick Leyland of Liverpool. On 14 June 1893 she sailed from Newcastle, New South Wales, for Valparaíso, Chile, with a cargo of coal and tallow and disappeared during the voyage.
