= Toronto Purchase =

Treaty to acquire lands of Toronto

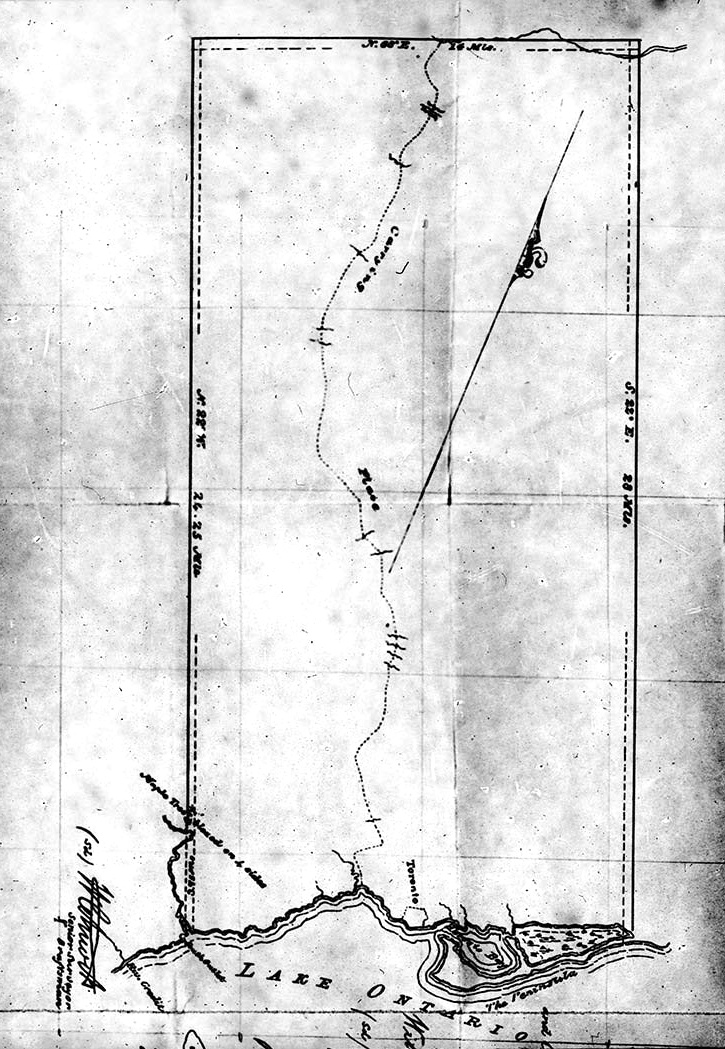
- A map of the Toronto Purchase.

History of Toronto
- Events: Toronto Purchase; Founding of York; Battle of York; Battle of Montgomery's Tavern; Incorporation of Toronto
- Buildings: Oldest buildings; Lost buildings; National Historic Sites; Great Fire 1849; Great Fire 1904

The Toronto Purchase was the sale of lands in the Toronto area from the Mississaugas of New Credit to the British crown. An initial, disputed, agreement was made in 1787, in exchange for various items. The agreement was revisited in 1805, intended to clarify the area purchased. The agreement remained in dispute for over 200 years until 2010, when a settlement for the land was made between the Government of Canada and the Mississaugas for the land and other lands in the area.

== 1787 purchase ==
Under the Treaty of Paris which ended the conflict between Great Britain and its former colonies, the boundary of British North America was set in the middle of the Great Lakes. This made the land north of the border more important, strategically and as the place for Loyalists to settle after the war. In 1781, the Mississaugas surrendered a strip of land along the Niagara River, and in 1783, land on the Bay of Quinte for the Mohawks who had been loyal to the British to settle (today's Tyendinaga Mohawk Territory). Between 1783 and 1785, 10,000 Loyalists arrived and were settling on land the Crown had recognized as Indian Land. In 1784, the Mississaugas surrendered more land in the Niagara peninsula, including land on the Grand River for the Iroquois.

In 1786, Lord Dorchester arrived in Quebec City as Governor-in-Chief of British North America. His mission was to solve the problems of the newly landed Loyalists. At first, Dorchester suggested opening the new Canada West as districts under the Quebec government, but the British Government made known its intention to split Canada into Upper and Lower Canada. Dorchester began organizing for the new province of Upper Canada, including a capital. Dorchester's first choice was Kingston, but was aware of the number of Loyalists in the Bay of Quinte and Niagara areas, and chose instead the location north of the Bay of Toronto, midway between the settlements and 30 miles (48 km) from the US. Under the policy of the time, the British recognized aboriginal title to the land and Dorchester arranged to purchase the lands from the Mississaugas.

The 1787 purchase, according to British records, was conducted on September 23, 1787, at the "Carrying-Place" of Bay of Quinte. The British crown and the Mississaugas of New Credit met to arrange for the sale of lands along Lake Ontario. In the case of the Toronto area, the Mississaugas of New Credit exchanged 250,808 acres (101,498 ha) of land in what became York County (most of current Toronto and the Regional Municipality of York bounded by Lake Ontario to the south, approximately Etobicoke Creek and Highways 427 and 50 (both part of a now mostly-vanished road known as Indian Line, which was named due to it forming the purchase boundary) to the west, approximately Ashbridge's Bay/Woodbine Avenue-Highway 404 to the east and approximately south of Sideroad 15-Bloomington Road to the north) for some money, 2,000 gun flints, 24 brass kettles, 120 mirrors, 24 laced hats, a bale of flowered flannel, and 96 gallons of rum. At the time, the Mississaugas believed that the agreement was not a purchase extinguishing their rights to the land, but a rental of the lands for British use in exchange for gifts and presents in perpetuity.

Sir John Johnson, head of the Indian Department under Dorchester, described the Toronto Purchase as a ten-mile square at Toronto, with two to four miles on either side of the Toronto Carrying Place trail north to Lake Simcoe. Johnson and Indigenous representatives produced a blank deed, which did not have a land description, leaving the actual purchase incomplete.

In 1788, surveyor Alexander Aitken was assigned to conduct a survey of the Toronto site. The Mississaugas blocked him from surveying west of the Humber, saying the lands to the west had not been ceded. Aitken was only allowed to survey the land after British authorities interceded with the Mississaugas. Aitken surveyed west to Etobicoke Creek, but did not survey more than a few miles from the lake (as far north as the northern limit of where the creek forms the present Toronto-Mississauga limits) before stopping to avoid further confrontation. There was no further progress on the Purchase until 1805.

== 1805 indenture ==
In 1805, the British wanted to conclude a further treaty for the purchase of the lands along Lake Ontario to the west of the Toronto Purchase. Not knowing what the precise boundaries were for the Toronto Purchase, William Claus, the agent for the British Indian Department, met with Indigenous representatives to produce a new treaty. Claus presented a map showing the Purchase as including the lands from Ashbridge's Bay west to Etobicoke Creek, north 28 miles (45 km) to Simcoe. None of the Indigenous chiefs who had agreed to the original Purchase were alive to dispute the boundaries, which went far beyond the original acreage described by Johnson, and accepted the map. This became the basis for a new treaty.

An Indenture (a revision) of the deal was made on August 1, 1805. Both the 1787 Purchase and its 1805 Indenture were registered as Crown Treaty No. 13. For this revision, the Mississaugas of New Credit First Nation also claimed the Toronto Islands, which was not part of the purchase as the agreement only went to the Lake Ontario shoreline.

The land sold consists of:

- former City of Etobicoke
- former City of North York
- former (pre-amalgamation) City of Toronto
- former City of York
- former Borough of East York
- City of Vaughan
- King Township
- southwestern part of Markham
- western part of Whitchurch

The Purchase document was signed by Sir John Johnson, William Claus (deputy superintendent of Indian Affairs representing the Crown). Witnesses consisted of:

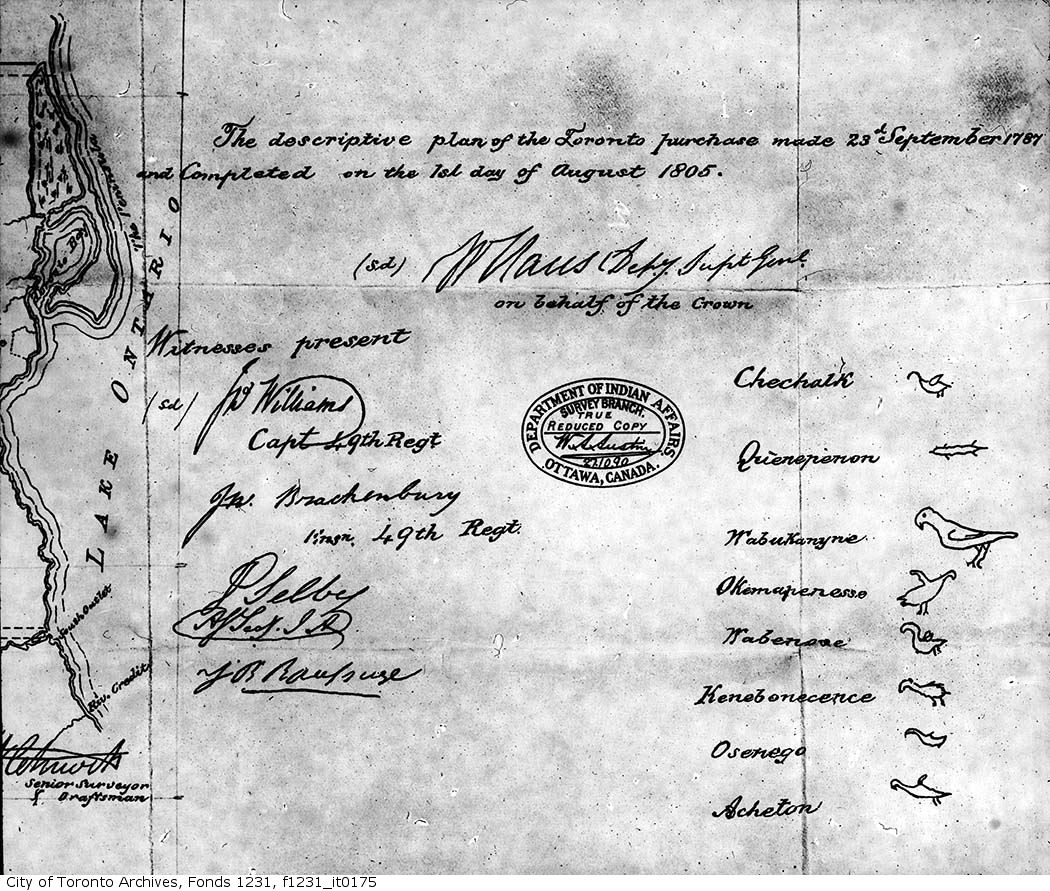
Signatures of the parties that ratified the Toronto Purchase, 1805

British

- Captain John W. Williams of the 49th Regiment
- Prideaux Selby of the Indian Department

Confirming Indian Chief Totems

- Jean-Bonaventure Rousseaux '(Jean Rousseaux)' - fur trader

First Nations

- Chechalk
- Quenepenon
- Wabukanyne
- Okemapenesse
- Wabenose
- Kenebonecence
- Osenego
- Acheton

== 2010 settlement ==
Starting in 1986, the Mississaugas opened a land claims settlement process with the Government of Canada to rectify its grievance over the Toronto Purchase and a smaller plot of land near Burlington Bay. In 2010, Canada agreed to pay CA$145 million for the lands, based on the ancient value of the land, extrapolated to current dollars. The money was distributed to the band government, with each of the 1,700 present-day Mississaugas receiving $20,000, with the rest placed in trust for future generations.

== See also ==
- Crawford Purchase
- Lord Dorchester
- Head of Lake Purchase 1806 - additional lands to the west of Toronto in what is the southern part of Mississauga, Ontario, Oakville and Burlington excluding small tracts covered in Treaty 22 (Mississauga and Oakville) and Brant Tract Treaty No. 18 1797 (Burlington)
- Ajetance Treaty No. 19 - additional lands north of Head of Lake Purchase for the remainder of Mississauga, Brampton, Ontario, Caledon, Ontario, Halton, Milton, Erin, East Garafraxa as well as parts of Guelph, Centre Wellington and Orangeville
- Rouge Tract Claim or Gunshot Treaty - covering most of Markham (excluding parts in Toronto Purchase but not covering lands east of Little Rouge Creek), eastern parts of Richmond Hill, Stouffville, and a small section of northeastern North York and Scarborough
