= Ryerson's Island =

Island in Ontario, Canada

- Interactive map of Ryerson's Island

Geography
- Location: Lake Erie
- Coordinates: 42.602358°N 80.281611°W
- Archipelago: Long Point

Administration
- Canada
- Province: Ontario
- County: Norfolk

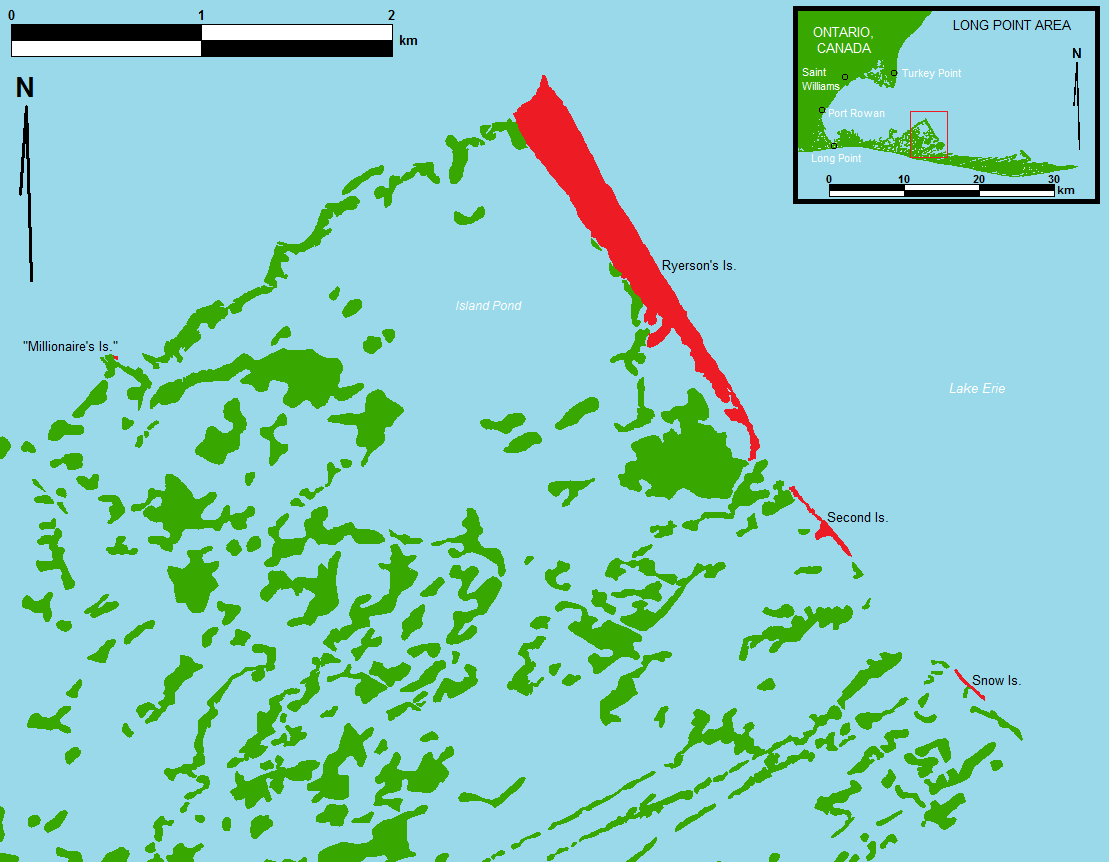
The location of Ryerson's Island.

Ryerson's Island is an island in Ontario, Canada, located in Lake Erie north of Long Point. The island is named for its first owner, Colonel Joseph Ryerson (1764-1854), who was a Loyalist sniper from New Jersey in a unit that tried to kill George Washington, later serving with the Prince of Wales American Regiment and father of Egerton Ryerson.
