= Long Point, Ontario =

Canadian community

- Unincorporated hamlet
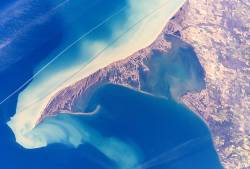
- Long Point Peninsula with bright sediment plumes (north to lower right). Source: NASA

- Location of Long Point in Ontario
- Coordinates: 42°32′51″N 80°3′33″W
- Country: Canada
- Province: Ontario
- Amalgamated into Norfolk County: 2001 (single-tier municipality)

Government
  - Mayor: Kristal Chopp
  - Governing body: The Council of The Corporation of Norfolk County
  - MPs: Leslyn Lewis (Conservative)
  - MPPs: Bobbi Ann Brady (Independent)
- Elevation: 210 m (690 ft)
- Time zone: UTC-5 (EST)
  - Summer (DST): UTC-4 (EDT)
- Forward sortation area: N0E 1M0
- Area codes: 519 and 226
- Website: www.norfolkcounty.ca

Ramsar Wetland
- Official name: Long Point
- Designated: 24 May 1982
- Reference no.: 237

Long Point is a sand spit and medium-sized hamlet on the north shore of Lake Erie, part of Norfolk County in the province of Ontario, Canada.

It is about 40 kilometres (25 mi) long and about 1 km (0.62 mi) across at its widest point. Lake Erie lies to the south of Long Point, and Long Point Bay lies on the north side. The bay is subdivided into the Inner Bay and Outer Bay by a line that runs between Turkey Point to the north and Pottahawk Point to the south. Some of the towns along the bay's north shore include Port Rowan, Turkey Point, and Port Dover. Long Point is north of and across the lake from Presque Isle and Erie, Pennsylvania.

== History ==
Settlers from Europe began arriving in this area in 1790. After the American Revolution, many Loyalists began to settle here but after 1796, land was given to anyone who was capable of developing it. The first lighthouse was built in 1830.

The renovated Old Cut Lighthouse

In the 19th century, a powerful storm cut an opening through the middle of Long Point. A lighthouse was built alongside the channel, which was the first of several on the point. The opening became known as "The Old Cut". The cut has since closed along the lakeshore, but boaters continue to use the northern portion to reach the bay, homes and cottages.

During the mid-19th century some of local residents saw an opportunity to make easy money by "blackbirding." Blackbirders erected fake lighthouses during times of low visibility. Ships trying to enter the old cut would run aground. When the crew abandoned ship the blackbirders would loot the ship of cargo and other valuables. With law enforcement based in London, Ontario, these blackbirders would store their loot on the many hiding spots that Long Point offered.

Abigail Becker on several occasions in the 19th century waded into stormy waters to save crew members of boats that had run aground. Long Point has caused many shipwrecks, with many of the wrecks located right off the tip of the point. More than 400 ships have sunk in an area called "The Lake Erie Quadrangle".

Sport hunting was important after the Long Point Company purchased the Point in 1866 to facilitate this pursuit. Long Point Provincial Park was created in May 1921; by 1929, it was connected to the mainland by a new causeway.

== Economy and recreation ==
The year-round population of Long Point is about 450 people, but the population increases in summer months when cottagers and campers visit. Long Point is a popular destination for boating, swimming, fishing, waterfowl-hunting and canoeing, attracting between 100,000 and 300,000 visitors each year. A large portion of Long Point is owned by the Long Point Company, a private organization that does not allow the public onto its property. Because of this, most homes, cottages and business are within the first few kilometres of the causeway that carries the road between Long Point and the mainland. Long Point Provincial Park, a popular destination for day visitors and campers, is located on the peninsula.

== Natural environment ==
Long Point is an example of sand dune and sand-spit formation in the Great Lakes region. It is the largest erosion deposit formation in the Great Lakes, created by water-borne sediments swept eastward and deposited in part along an underwater glacial moraine. Habitats on and surrounding Long Point include woodlands, sand dunes and bluffs, marshes, ponds, meadows, beaches and lakeshore. The complex is the largest biophysical formation of its kind in the Laurentian Great Lakes of North America. North of the peninsula lie several islands, including Ryerson's, Second, and Snow.

In 1982, the Long Point National Wildlife Area was recognized as a wetland of international significance under the Ramsar Convention. In 1986, Long Point Biosphere Reserve was designated as a World Biosphere Reserve by UNESCO and as a globally significant Important Bird Area by Bird Life International. The Ontario Ministry of Natural Resources classifies Long Point as a Macrosite, an area that contains numerous ecological or geological significant zones, such as Areas of Natural and Scientific Interest.

Inner Long Point Bay covers approximately 78 km^{2} (30 sq mi) between the spit and Lake Erie's north shore. The Inner Bay is a diverse sport fishery and continentally important staging area for migratory waterfowl. Immediately adjacent to the coastal reserve is a distinctive terrestrial area of temperate 'Carolinian' broadleaf forests, conifer plantations, oak savannas and diverse agro-ecosystems.

=== Wildlife ===
The region is an important location for bird migration in spring and autumn. It is a major staging area for a variety of waterfowl. "Long Point itself is one of the most important wetland complexes for migrating waterfowl in southern Canada, and is reported to receive the highest waterfowl use (based on numbers of waterfowl days during spring and fall migration) of any area on the Great Lakes (approximately 4 million days per year). Up to 30,000 Tundra Swans pass through the area in spring, and up to 8% of the world's Canvasbacks congregate in the area on any one day during spring and fall," according to a report by the Long Point World Biosphere Reserve.

In 1960, the Long Point Bird Observatory was established to monitor migrant birds on the point. It is North America's oldest bird observatory. As a result of a growing national focus towards saving the birds, the organization was renamed Bird Studies Canada in 1998. Its national headquarters overlooks Long Point Inner Bay on the western limits of Port Rowan, adjacent to base of the peninsula.

The Long Point Biosphere Reserve and surrounding area is home to 1384 species of plant, 370 species of birds, 102 species of fish, 46 species of mammals, 34 species of amphibians and reptiles, and 91 species of butterflies. These include Species at Risk such as American ginseng (Panax quinquefollus), American badger (Taxidea taxus), Acadian flycatcher (Empidonax virescens) and channel darter (Percina copelandi).

== Climate ==
According to the Atlas of Canada, Long point has a cool summer humid continental climate with no dry season (Köppen climate classification Dfb). The climate of Long Point is influenced by Lake Erie, causing spring and summer temperatures to be cooler, and autumn and winter temperatures to be warmer than the adjacent mainland. Winters are relatively cool, with a mean temperature of 1 °C (33.8 °F) while summers are warm, averaging 22 °C (71.6 °F). Long Point averages 860 mm (34 in) of precipitation per year. It is estimated that Long Point averages 2,000 hours of bright sunshine per year or 45% of possible sunshine.

Climate data for Long Point, Ontario (1991–2020 averages)
| Month | Jan | Feb | Mar | Apr | May | Jun | Jul | Aug | Sep | Oct | Nov | Dec | Year |
|---|---|---|---|---|---|---|---|---|---|---|---|---|---|
| Mean daily maximum °C (°F) | 0.2 (32.4) | 0.0 (32.0) | 3.6 (38.5) | 9.6 (49.3) | 16.0 (60.8) | 20.6 (69.1) | 23.7 (74.7) | 23.6 (74.5) | 20.6 (69.1) | 14.8 (58.6) | 8.6 (47.5) | 3.2 (37.8) | 12.0 (53.6) |
| Daily mean °C (°F) | −3.2 (26.2) | −3.1 (26.4) | 0.7 (33.3) | 6.3 (43.3) | 12.7 (54.9) | 18.3 (64.9) | 21.6 (70.9) | 21.7 (71.1) | 18.7 (65.7) | 12.6 (54.7) | 6.3 (43.3) | 0.3 (32.5) | 9.4 (48.9) |
| Mean daily minimum °C (°F) | −5.4 (22.3) | −5.7 (21.7) | −2.3 (27.9) | 2.9 (37.2) | 9.2 (48.6) | 15.6 (60.1) | 19.5 (67.1) | 19.7 (67.5) | 16.1 (61.0) | 9.9 (49.8) | 3.7 (38.7) | −1.6 (29.1) | 6.8 (44.2) |
Source: Infoclimat.fr

== Gallery ==
Views of Long Point, Ontario

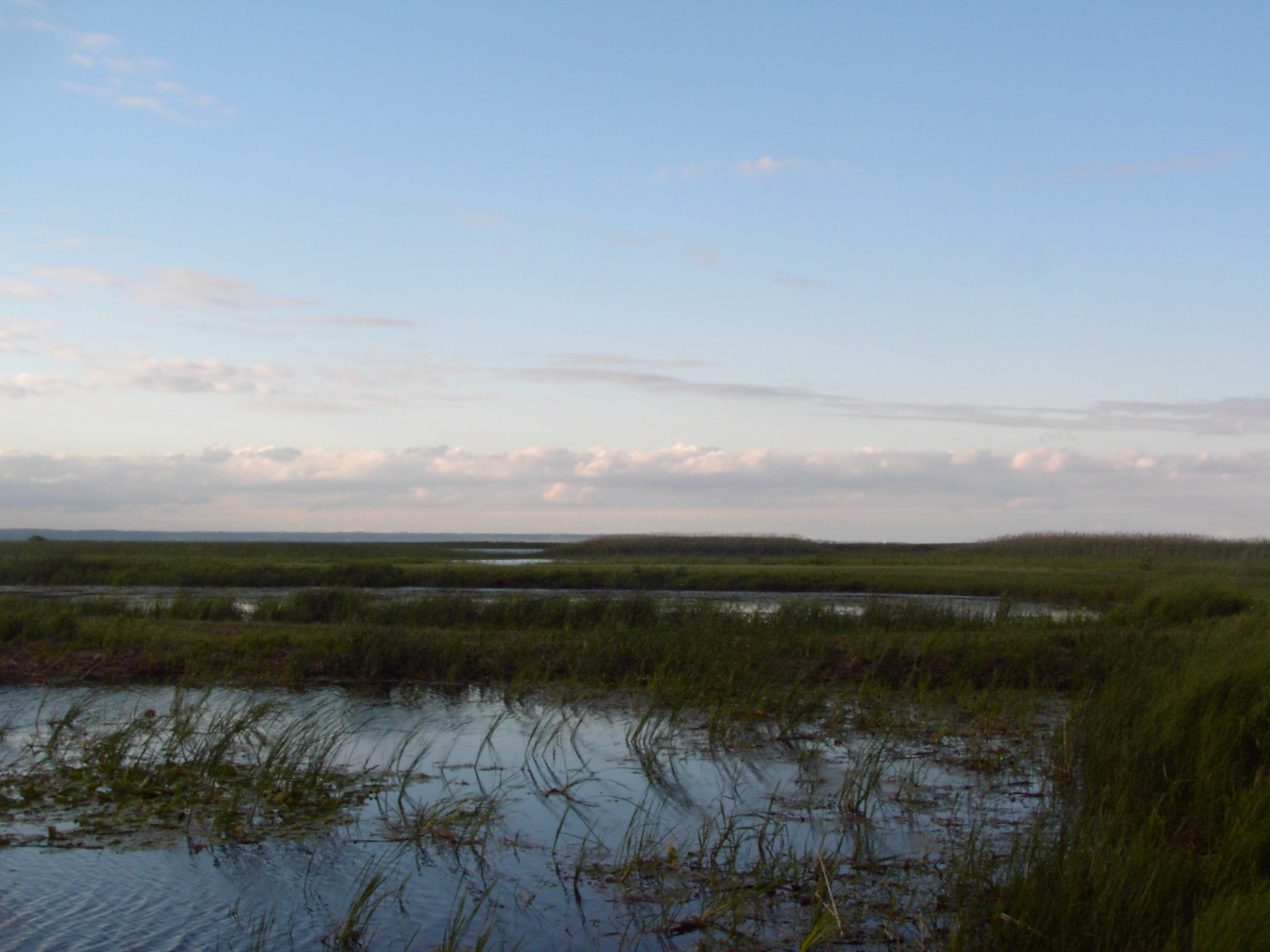
The marshes of Long Point, as seen from the Provincial Park.

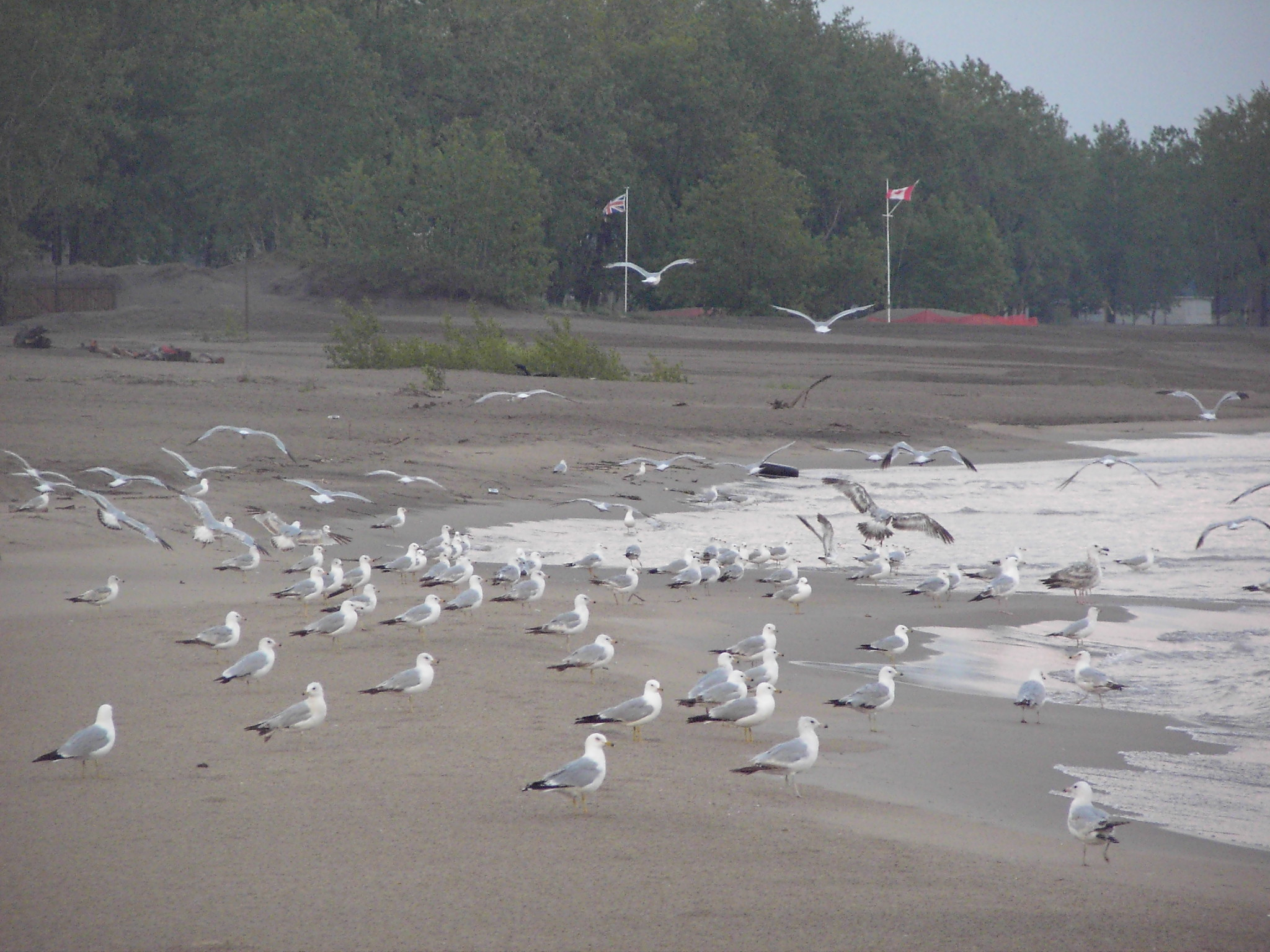
A flock of gulls on the beach.

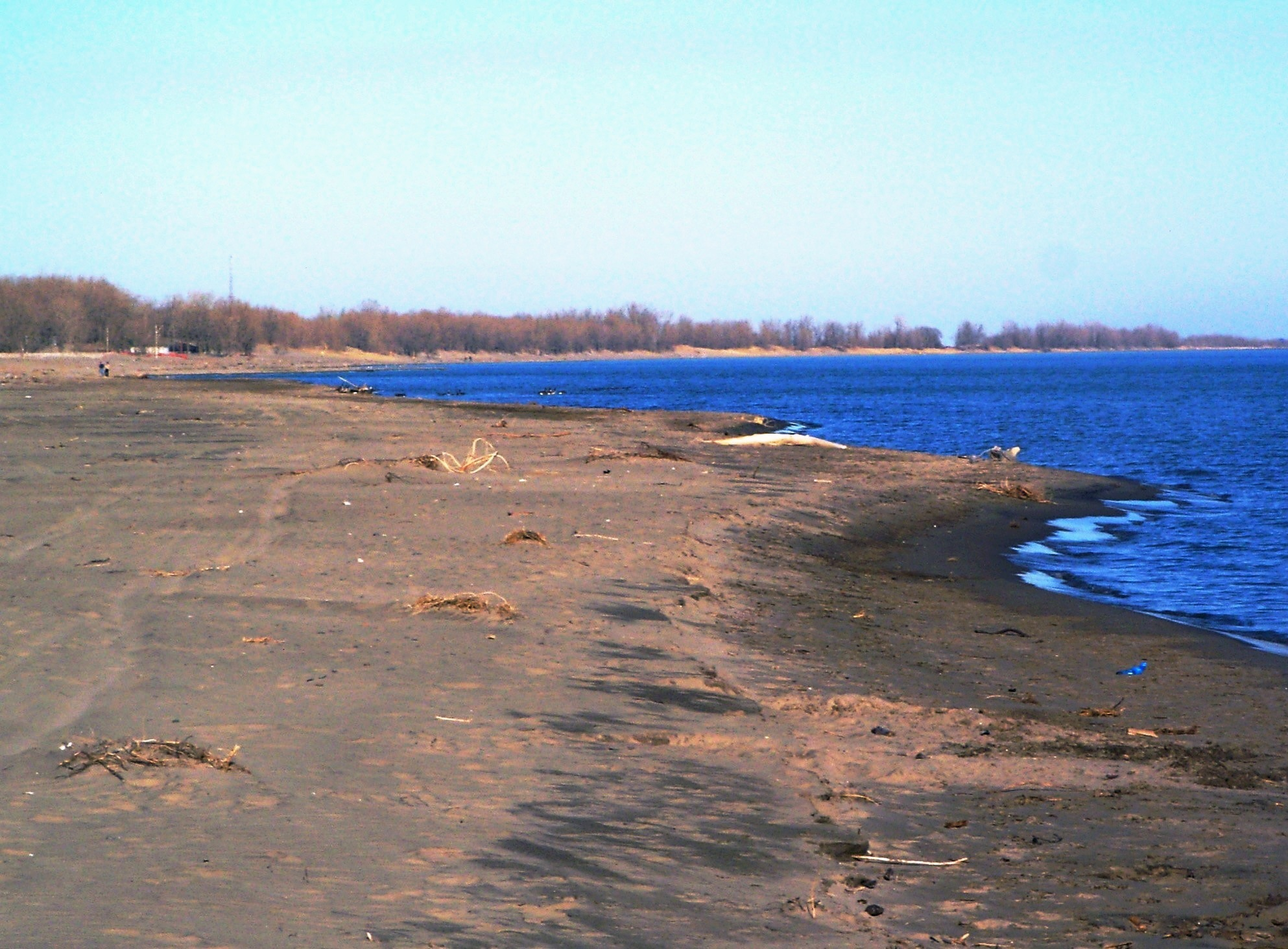
Lake Erie

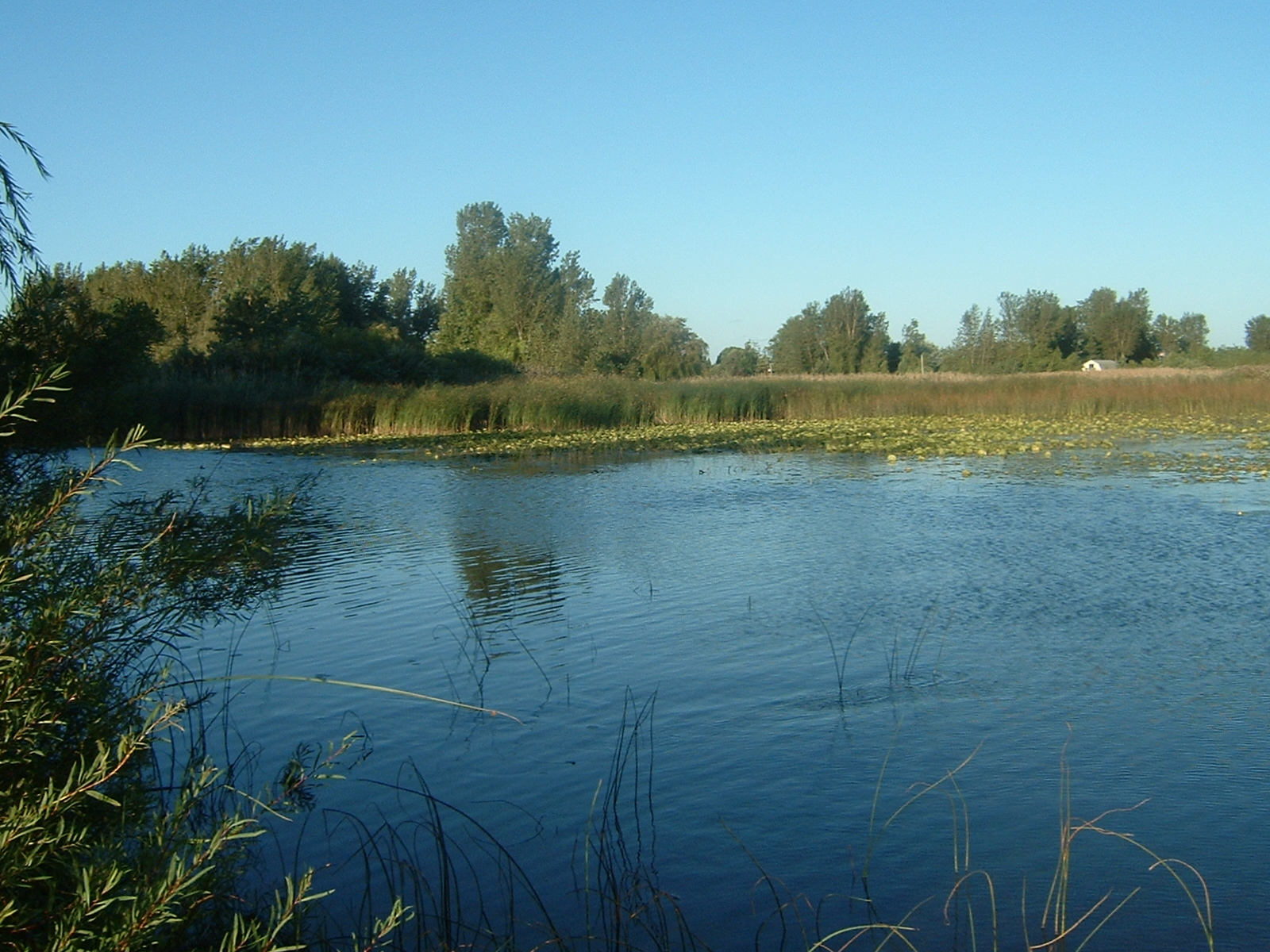
View of a channel through the marsh in Long Point Bay.

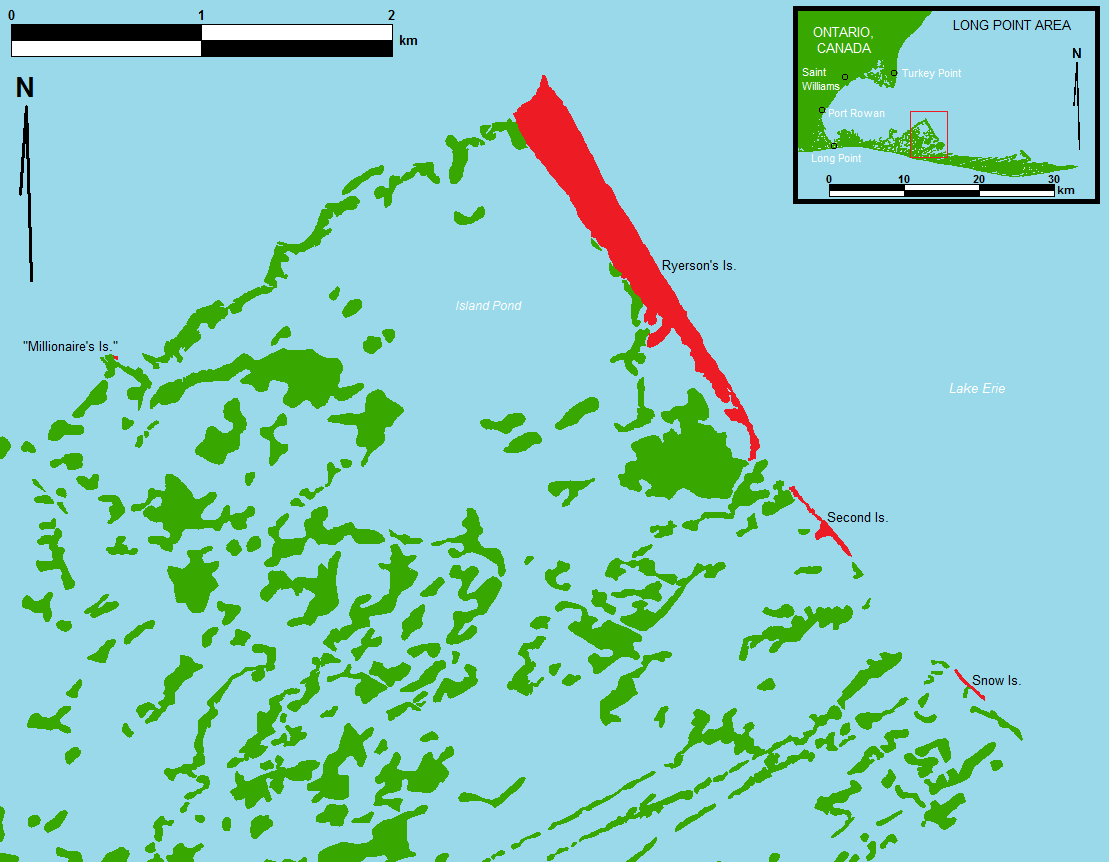
Map of the Lake Erie Islands located near Long Point.

== See also ==
- List of shipwrecks
- List of UNESCO Biosphere Reserves in Canada
