= SS Albany =

Several merchant ships have been named SS Albany:

- SS Albany (1862), UK propeller. Wrecked off New South Wales in 1905.
- SS Albany (1882), UK propeller. Sank en route between Japan and China in 1891.
- SS Albany (1884), US propeller. Sank on Lake Huron in 1893.
