= Joseph Ryerson =

United Empire Loyalist soldier

- Born: February 28, 1761; Paterson, New Jersey
- Died: 9 August 1854 (aged 93); Charlotteville, Canada West
- Spouse: Sarah Mehetable Stickney (m. 1784; died 1850)
- Children: 6, including Egerton
- Military career
- Allegiance: Great Britain (Loyalist)
- Service years: 1776 — 1830
- Rank: Lieutenant
- Unit: Prince of Wales American Volunteers
- Conflicts: American War of Independence: Siege of Charleston (1778); War of 1812

Joseph Ryerson (28 February 1761 – 9 August 1854) was a United Empire Loyalist, Lieutenant in the Prince of Wales American Volunteers in the American Revolutionary War, a Lieutenant-Colonel Commanding the First Regiments of the Norfolk Militia in the War of 1812 and father of Egerton Ryerson. Ryerson was a descendant of Dutch immigrants who held judicial appointments to King George II and King George III.

Some texts include the spelling of the surname as "Ryerse" rather than Ryerson. This was the result of a mistake in Ryerson's brother, Samuel's military commission at the start of the Revolutionary War. The mistake continued through Samuel's military career and was finally retained in that branch of the Ryerson family.

== Early years ==
Joseph Ryerson was born in 1761 in Paterson, New Jersey; younger brother to Samuel Ryerse (Ryerson), Captain the Third Battalion of New Jersey Volunteers. He was born the seventh son and his father died early in his childhood.

== Revolutionary War ==
At the outbreak of war in 1776, Ryerson entered the war on 6 May 1776, as a cadet. He was too small of stature to handle a musket and therefore was assigned a "light fowling-piece" or a light shotgun used for hunting fowl. Later in 1776, he joined an infantry corps that was intended to besiege Charleston, South Carolina. The mission being extremely hard and dangerous, only one-sixth of the original 550 men returned to the Northern States, Ryerson being one of those returned.

In recognition of his service in the Charleston campaign, in 1778, he was made an ensign in the Prince of Wales Regiment. No stranger to risk-taking, while on a scouting expedition, he crawled up to a tent of American Officers. He was discovered, by one, standing at the door of the tent, and then plunged his bayonet into the heart of the American before others could give pursuit. Altogether, he fought in six battles, several minor encounters and was wounded.

As a result of his service and courage, he was in 1779 promoted to the rank of lieutenant in the Prince of Wales Regiment.

Ryerson had earned the respect of his comrades, one of which, Peter Redner, of the Bay Quinté, described him as "a man of daring intrepidity, and a great favourite in his company". Redner represented Ryerson as being one of the "most determined men he ever knew, with the service of his great country uppermost in his mind, he often exposed himself to great danger to accomplish his desires."

== United Empire loyalist ==
At the conclusion of the war, Ryerson who held allegiance to the British Crown, could not remain in his home state of New Jersey. He moved to New Brunswick receiving land at Majorville, Saint John. From there, in 1799, he transferred to Charlotteville in Upper Canada where he remained until his death.

Ever the public servant, Ryerson could not refrain from public office. In 1800, he was made a member of the first commission of magistrates and became Chairman of the Courts of Quart Sessions. Additionally, he served as high sheriff and treasurer of the London District.

== War of 1812 ==
When the War of 1812 broke out, Ryerson was tapped by Isaac Brock to be a Lieutenant Colonel Commanding the First Regiments of the Norfolk Militia. Ryerson, his brother Samuel and his sons, George, William and John, also served to defend Canada from the Americans. Egerton at the time was too young to join in the fighting. In 1830, Joseph tendered his resignation not out of lack of desire, but citing reasons of ill health and advanced age (he was 69 years old).

== Personal life ==
In 1784, he married Sarah Mehetable Stickney. Together, they had the following children: George (1792–1884), William, John (?–1878), Egerton, Edwy (1808–1858), and Samuel. In 1850, Sarah died at 84 years of age. Joseph continued living a vigorous life after the death of his wife; riding and walking several miles the Friday before his death, in 1854.

== Online exhibitions ==
http://library.ryerson.ca/asc/2012/12/the-war-of-1812-two-hundred-years-ago/
