= Egerton Ryerson =

Canadian educator and Methodist minister (1803–1882)

The Reverend Egerton Ryerson
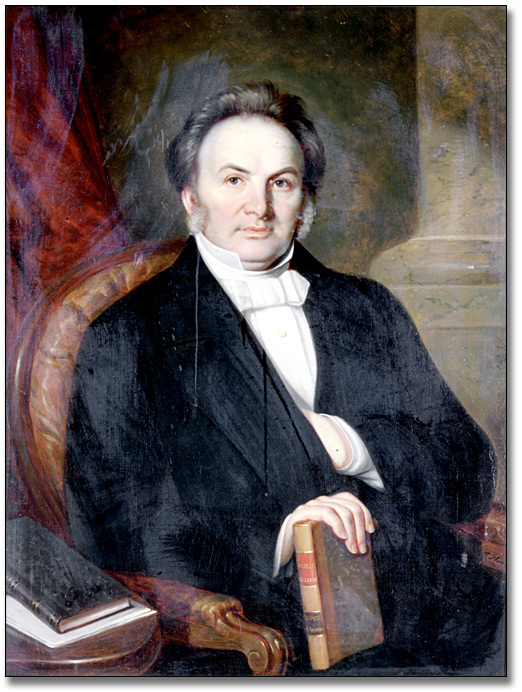
- Portrait of Ryerson by Théophile Hamel, c.1850–51

2nd President of Victoria College
- In office 1850 – 1854
- Preceded by: Matthew Richey
- Succeeded by: Samuel Sobieski Nelles

3rd Principal of Victoria College
- In office 1841 – 1847
- Preceded by: Jesse B. Hurlburt
- Succeeded by: Alexander MacNab

Personal details
- Born: Adolphus Egerton Ryerson; 24 March 1803 Charlotteville Township, Norfolk County, Upper Canada
- Died: 19 February 1882 (aged 78) Toronto, Ontario
- Spouses: Hannah Aikman (m. 1828; died 1832); Mary Armstrong (m. 1833)
- Children: 4
- Parents: Joseph Ryerson (father); Sarah Stickney (mother)
- Occupation: Educator; minister; author; editor; administrator
- Known for: Championing free schooling in Canada, influence in the design of the Canadian Indian residential school system

Adolphus Egerton Ryerson (24 March 1803 – 19 February 1882) was a Canadian educator, administrator, author, editor, and Methodist minister. He was a prominent contributor to the design of the Ontario public school system, for which he served as an administrator.

An advocate against Christian sectarianism and control of Upper Canada by the wealthy Anglican elite, Ryerson staunchly opposed Clergy reserves and promoted a system of free public education in Canada. Conversely, Ryerson was passionate about Christianization, favouring missionary work amongst the indigenous peoples and protesting the removal of the Bible from Ontario schools.

Following his time as a missionary to the Mississaugas of the Credit River, Ryerson became founding editor of The Christian Guardian, and the first principal of Victoria College in Cobourg. He was appointed as Chief Superintendent of Education for Upper Canada by Governor General Sir Charles Metcalfe in 1844, where he supported reforms such as creating school boards, making textbooks more uniform, and making education free. His contributions to early education in Ontario led to him being memorialized with statues, and in the naming of several institutions and places in the province.

Ryerson was consulted by the founders of the Indian residential school system. However, he was not directly involved in founding or running of the residential school system, and predeceased its creation.

== Early years ==
Ryerson was born on 24 March 1803 in Charlotteville Township, Upper Canada, to Joseph Ryerson (1761–1854), a United Empire Loyalist, a Lieutenant in the Prince of Wales' American Volunteers from Passaic County, New Jersey, and Sarah Mehetable Ryerson (née Stickney). He was one of six brothers – George, Samuel, William, John, and Edwy. Samuel was the only one of Egerton's brothers not to enter the Methodist ministry.

== Methodist missionary ==
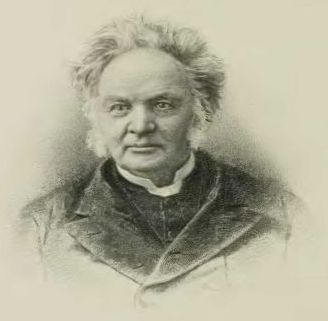
Egerton Ryerson, from an 1880 publication

He joined the Methodist Episcopal Church at 17, and was forced to leave home by his Anglican father. After briefly studying Latin and Greek, he became a circuit rider. His first post was the York region surrounding Yonge Street. The circuit took four weeks to complete on foot or horseback, as it encompassed areas with roads in extremely poor condition.

Ryerson was appointed as a missionary to the Mississaugas of the Credit in 1826, while still on probation as a Methodist missionary. His journal records his feelings on arrival:

I have now arrived at my charge among the Indians. I feel an inexpressible joy in taking up my abode amongst them. I must now acquire a new language, to teach a new people.

Ryerson learned Ojibwe, worked in the fields, and assisted them in building a church which doubled as a school. When burdened by the encroachment of settlers, Ryerson supported a protest to the Legislature for the Mississaugas' exclusive right to a salmon fishery. At a meeting that same week, Chief Ajetance addressed him: "Brother, as we are brothers, we will give you a name. My departed brother was named Cheehock; thou shalt be called Cheehock." It was during this time that Ryerson began his life-long friendship with future chief Kahkewaquonaby (Peter Jones).

At Port Credit, Ryerson helped the Mississaugas build a school, using his carpentry skills, which he passed along to people of the settlement, along with his agricultural knowledge. The school was staffed by Methodist missionaries and Mississauga teachers. It had 50 students and taught boys and girls separately. The children learned to read and write both English and Anishinaabemowin from primers and Scripture. Ryerson wrote to Upper Canada's Lieutenant Governor Maitland on the need for continued support of the school and other Methodist missionary schools: "The schools and religious instruction must be continued; and the Gospel must be sent to tribes still in a heathen state".

In 1826, sermons from John Strachan, Anglican Archdeacon of York, Upper Canada, were published asserting that the Anglican church was, by law, the established church of Upper Canada. Methodists were singled out as American and therefore disloyal. Ryerson emerged as an articulate defender in the public sphere by publishing articles (at first anonymously) and later books that argued against the views of Methodism's chief rival John Strachan and other members of the powerful Family Compact.

Ryerson was elected (by one vote) to serve as the founding editor of Canadian Methodism's weekly denominational newspaper, the Christian Guardian, established in York in 1829 and which was also Canada's first religious newspaper. He used the paper to argue for the rights of Methodists in the province and, later, to help convince rank-and-file Methodists that a merger with British Wesleyans (effected in 1833) was in their best interest. Ryerson was castigated by the reformist press at that time for apparently abandoning the cause of reform and becoming, at least as far as they were concerned, a Tory. Ryerson resigned the editorship in 1835 only to assume it again at his brother John's urging from 1838 to 1840. In 1840, Ryerson allowed his name to stand for re-election one last time but was soundly defeated by a vote of 50 to 1.

== Educator ==
In April 1831, Ryerson wrote in The Christian Guardian newspaper,

On the importance of education generally we may remark, it is as necessary as the light – it should be as common as water and as free as air. Education among the people is the best security of a good government and constitutional liberty; it yields a steady, unbending support to the former, and effectually protects the latter... The first object of a wise government should be the education of the people... Partial knowledge is better than total ignorance. If total ignorance be a bad and dangerous thing, every degree of knowledge lessens both the evil and the danger.

In 1836, Ryerson visited England to secure the charter for Upper Canada Academy. This was the first charter ever granted by the British Government to a Nonconformist body for an educational institution. When it was incorporated in 1841 under the name Victoria College Ryerson assumed the presidency. Victoria College continues to exist as part of the University of Toronto. Ryerson also fought for many secularization reforms, to keep power and influence away from any one church, particularly the Church of England in Upper Canada which had pretensions to establishment. His advocacy of Methodism contributed to the eventual sale of the Clergy Reserves – large tracts of land that had been set aside for the "maintenance of the Protestant clergy" under the Constitutional Act of 1791. "In honour of his achievements on behalf of the Methodist Church, Egerton Ryerson received a Doctor of Divinity degree from Wesleyan University in Connecticut and served as President of the Church in Canada from 1874 to 1878."

Such secularization also led to the widening of the school system into public hands. Governor General Sir Charles Metcalfe asked him to become Chief Superintendent of Education for Upper Canada in 1844 and he remained in the position until 1876.

The Normal School at St. James Square was founded in Toronto in 1847, and became the province's foremost teacher's academy. It also housed the Department of Education as well as the Museum of Natural History and Fine Arts, which became the Royal Ontario Museum. The school operated by the Ontario Society of Artists at the Normal School would become the Ontario College of Art & Design. An agricultural laboratory on the site led to the later founding of the Ontario Agricultural College and the University of Guelph. St. James Square went through various other educational uses before it eventually became part of Ryerson University.

== Legislation ==
=== Common School Act of 1846 ===
Ryerson's study of educational systems elsewhere in the Western world led to three school acts, which would revolutionize education in Canada. His major innovations included libraries in every school, an educational journal and professional development conventions for teachers, a central textbook press using Canadian authors, and securing land grants for universities.

The Common School Act of 1846, was an act that had established the First General School Board, where it would consist of Seven Members, that would each have their own responsibilities. Ryerson set the groundwork for compulsory education, which is what it has become today, he ensured that curriculums were made and that teaching and learning materials were provided and delivered to Schools, in the result of the best possible education. Ryerson did not believe that white and Aboriginal children should be taught in the same schools due to their different civilization and their upbringings.

==== Superintendent of Schools for Canada West ====
Ryerson observed that previous educational legislation, most notably the Common School Act of 1843, was ineffective due to the limited powers of authority of the Superintendent of Schools. By comparing the office of the Superintendent to a corresponding office in New York State, namely the "State Superintendent", he noted that the 1843 Act allowed the Superintendent to draw up rules and responsibilities but no one was required to follow them. In his draft of the bill, he included several responsibilities of the Superintendent for Upper Canada: apportioning Legislature funds among the twenty district councils (in existence at that point in time), discouragement of unsuitable texts for classroom and school library usage (no common texts were the norm), provide direction for normal schools, prepare recommended plans for school houses and school libraries, dissemination of information, and annual reporting to the Governor General. This considerably expanded the role of Superintendent and placed significantly more responsibility upon the office.

Further, he established the first General Board of Education (the one established in 1823 was by order of the Lieutenant Governor not by legislation). The board consisted of the Superintendent and six other members nominated by the Governor General.

==== District superintendents ====
The bill provided provision for a new office, that of the District Superintendent. Ryerson recommended, although it did not become part of the legislation that followed from the 1846 bill, that as a savings measure the offices of Clerk of the District and District Superintendent be combined.

The District Superintendents became important civil servants, apportioning District School Funds in proportion of the number of students, teacher payment, visit all schools in their district; reporting on progress, advising teachers on school management, examining teachers' qualifications, revoking unqualified teachers, and preventing the use of unauthorized textbooks.

==== Common textbooks ====
Ryerson advocated for uniform school textbooks across Canada West. Again, benchmarking the New York system, he noted that an Act passed in 1843 gave the State Superintendent of Schools and county superintendents authority to reject any book in a school library. That system used University Regents to create a list of acceptable texts from which the schools purchased books. Ryerson did not propose absolute authority on book selection, rather, recommended that the Board of Education "make out a list of School Text Books, in each branch of learning that they would recommend, and another list they would not permit leaving Trustees to select from these lists."

Ryerson was also responsible for developing the first Ontario Readers for Canadian students to replace British, Irish and American textbooks.

==== Free schools ====
With the intent of providing education for all Canadian children, Ryerson began lobbying for the idea of free schools in 1846. His convictions on the matter were strengthened after studying systems of education in New York State and Massachusetts where financial provision for education was a cardinal one. Ryerson pointed out that, in Toronto alone, less than half of the 4,450 children in the city were regular school attendees.

In his Circular to the County Municipalities, in 1846, he argued the following:

"The basis of this only true system of universal Education is two fold":

1. that every inhabitant of a Country is bound to contribute to the support of its Public Institutions, according to the property which he acquires, or enjoys, under the Government of the Country.
2. That every child born, or brought up in the Country, has a right to that education which will fit him for the duties of a useful citizen of the Country, and is not to be deprived of it, on account of the inability, or poverty, of his parents, or guardians."

Ryerson was also determined to provide education to those less privileged, as a means of improving the opportunities of all; or as he described it as the "only effectual remedy for the pernicious and pauperizing system which is at present. Many children are now kept from school on the alleged grounds of parental poverty." Ryerson was persuasive in his arguments such that principle for free education, in a permission form, was embodied into the School Law of 1850. Subsequent debate followed until 1871 when free school provision was included in the Comprehensive School Act of 1871.

=== Common School Act of 1850 ===
The Common School Act updated 1847 legislation creating school boards across Canada West. It required that municipalities meet the funding needs stated by their local school board and allows for schools to be paid for through provincial and municipal funds alone, allowing individual boards to eliminate school fees but not making this compulsory. The Act also allowed for the creation of separate schools leading to provincially funded Catholic schools and to racially segregated schools. Although the act was passed during Ryerson's time as superintendent, he was an opponent of segregation in schools at times. Ryerson said that enshrining the racist tendencies of Upper Canadians into law would be "a disgrace to our Legislature", and attempted to force school boards establishing segregated schools to admit Black students, encouraging their families to mount lawsuits when they wouldn't.

=== The School Act of 1871 ===
The School Act made elementary education compulsory and free up to age 12. The Act also created two streams of secondary education: high schools, the lower stream, and collegiate institutes, the higher stream. Extra funding was provided for collegiate institutes "with a daily average attendance of sixty boys studying Latin and Greek under a minimum of four masters."

== Ryerson and residential schools ==
Ryerson's views on the instruction of Indigenous children were shaped by his experience as a Methodist missionary among the Mississaugas and his hopes of integrating the Indigenous people as prosperous members of Canadian society. His views also fit the time when Canadian society did not consider the Indigenous peoples to be 'civilized'. He therefore had clear views on the curriculum and administration of schools for Indigenous children and considered them to be of the best benefit for such integration.

In 1847, Ryerson was asked by George Vardon, the British Assistant Superintendent General of Indian Affairs, for his ideas as to "the best method of establishing and conducting Industrial Schools for the benefit of the Aboriginal Indian Tribes." This was following the 1844 Bagot Report and the 1846 Conference of the Narrows, a conference to update Indigenous communities on the establishment of manual labour day schools after Methodist and Ojibwe petitioning. The Methodists were given responsibility over the schools.

Vardon was anxious about the project's prospect. Ryerson replied with a five-page handwritten letter, later printed in 1898 as an appendix to a report on residential schools by the Indian Affairs Department. Ryerson rejected the term "manual labour schools," and his recommendations include academic studies not needed for mere "manual labour." Ryerson foresaw a system that would assimilate Indigenous youth into Canadian and Christian society. He said that "It would be a gratifying result to see graduates of our Indian industrial schools become overseers of some the largest farms in Canada, nor will it be less gratifying to see them industrious and prosperous farmers on their own account." The academic subjects recommended were: reading, principles of the English language, arithmetic, elementary geometry, geography, history, natural history, agricultural chemistry, writing, drawing, vocal music, book keeping (especially farmers accounts), religion and morals. The schools were to be residential, involving eight to 12 hours a day of labour and two hours of instruction, with more instruction and less labour during the winter season. The industrial schools should keep children from four to eight years, be conducted in English, provide instruction in Christian religion and be run by Christian churches with limited government oversight. This was different from his proposals for the Ontario public system, which separated church and state, and that no child should go to a religious school against the wishes of their parents. However, he did not recommend forcing Indigenous children to attend the schools, nor punishing them for speaking their Indigenous languages, conditions later introduced by the government or school administrators.

His recommendations were adopted by the Indian Affairs Department. By 1850, there were two major residential schools in Canada West: Alnwick, to serve northern and south-eastern bands in Alderville, and Mount Elgin, to serve south-western bands. Mount Elgin was to have been led by Peter Jones of the Mississaugas, but he was too ill to take up the task. The curriculum largely followed Ryerson's outline, which was itself in agreement with Methodists' plans to 'civilize' the Indigenous. In Ryerson's words "the North American Indian cannot be civilized or preserved in a state of civilization (including habits of industry and sobriety), except in connection with, if not by the influence of, not only religious instruction and sentiment but of religious feelings." Both schools failed, having lost the support of Ojibwe parents and chiefs and were closed by 1863. An 1879 report to the Macdonald government by journalist and Tory candidate Nicholas Flood Davin cited Ryerson's letter and this report was used as justification by the Macdonald government to begin a system of such schools across the country.

According to Hope MacLean, the purpose of the schools was "to eradicate Ojibwa Culture. Instruction in Christianity was considered a primary means of effecting change and consisted not only of daily prayers and attendance at church, but also the memorization of long passages of Scripture." The residential school system expanded geographically as federal policy extended into western and northern regions of Canada, with a growing number of institutions established. The Crown, and later Canada, often took on the obligation for the provision of education to First Nations youth in exchange for settlement lands under treaty. In the 21st century, the Government of Canada and the Pope of Rome officially apologized for the consequences of the school system.

Ryerson was not directly involved in the setup or running of the residential school system. He was involved in the Common Schools of Canada West and Ontario and the Normal School. Ryerson predeceased much of the residential school system's development. Any further communications by Ryerson on the subject of Indigenous instruction and its schools is not known. Secondary literature on Ryerson focuses on his role in the development of the Ontario public school system. This includes a two-volume Life and Letters (Sissons, 1937, 1947), and three biographies (Burwash, 1905; Thomas, 1969; and Damania, 1975). He had a direct role in the Ontario public education system, as described in several scholarly works on the subject (Putman, 1912; Curtis, 1989 and 1992; Pearce, 2020).

There are opposing views on the accusations against Ryerson and the decision to rename Ryerson University, and other places named after him (Smith, 2017 and 2021; Stagg and Dutil, 2021; Stagg, 2022; McDonald, 2021 and 2023).

== Legacy ==
Ryerson University (later renamed Toronto Metropolitan University), Ryerson Press (now McGraw-Hill Canada), and the Township of Ryerson in the Parry Sound District, Ontario, were named after him, as well as the small park, Ryerson Park, in the city of Owen Sound, at the northeast corner of 8th Street East and 5th Avenue East. There is also an intersection of two small streets in Toronto, Egerton Lane and Ryerson Avenue, between Spadina Avenue and Bathurst Street, north of Queen Street West.

In 2017, the university was urged to change its name in response to a campaign on social media, student organizations and petitions. A process of consultation was engaged in. The Standing Strong Task Force was appointed by the president. It held hearings, accepted briefs and letters and in 2021, reported with a recommendation to drop the name Ryerson and permanently remove his statue from the campus. This was promptly accepted by the University's Board of Governors and further consultations were held to determine the new name. In April 2022, the university announced the new name would be Toronto Metropolitan University.

On 8 June 2021, the town of Owen Sound, Ontario removed the name plaque of Ryerson Park. The park, named for Egerton Ryerson, will be renamed at the request of 1,000 residents of Owen Sound. The town pre-emptively removed the plaque to prevent its defacement and damage. A short list of location-based names has been suggested for the Owen Sound public to vote upon, before the town's council makes the decision final.A school named for Ryerson in Owen Sound was closed in 1990.

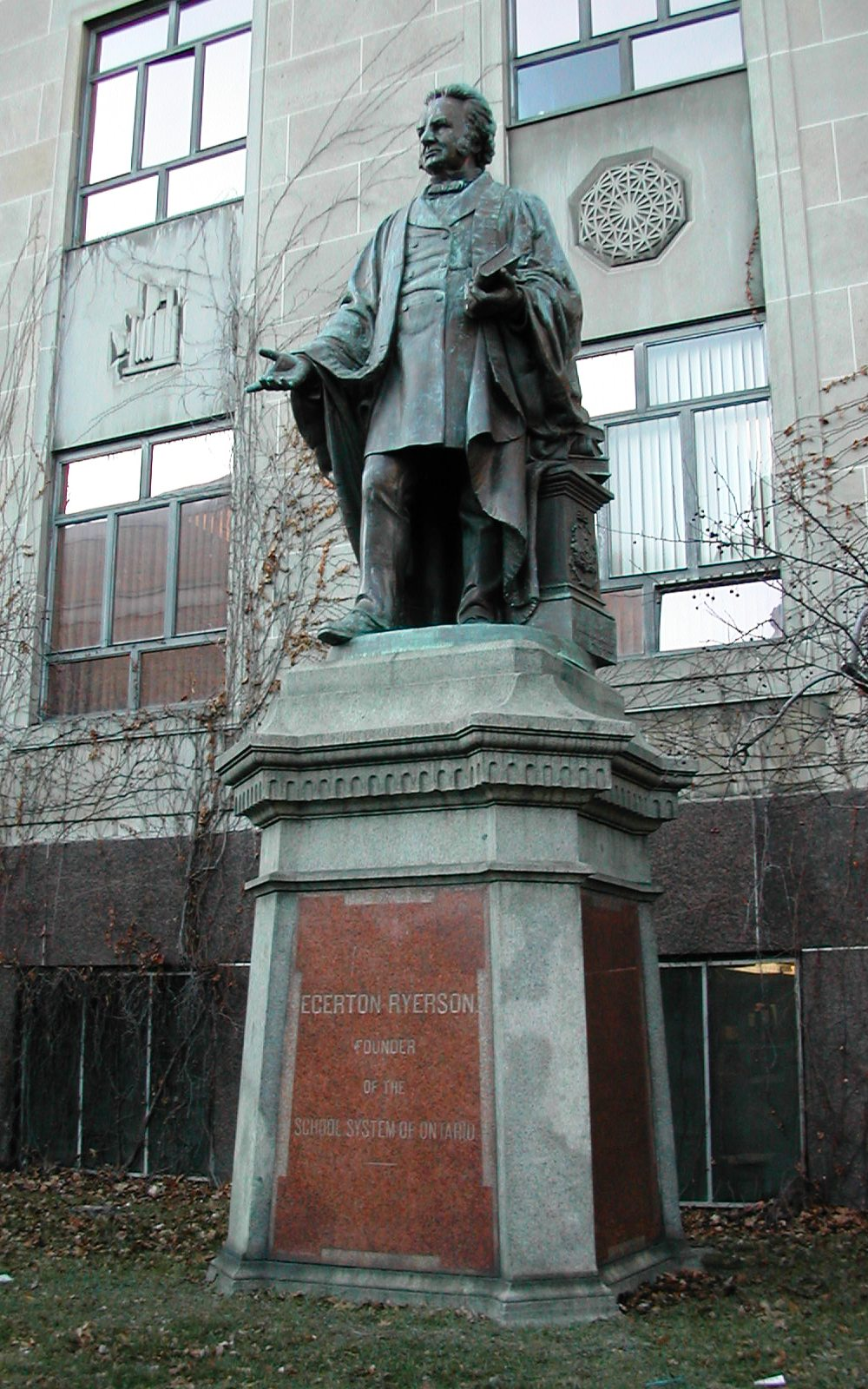
Statue of Ryerson on Ryerson Campus, 2005

=== Ryerson statue ===
A bronze statue of Ryerson was commissioned after his death in 1882, paid for by public subscription. The artist was Hamilton MacCarthy a noted artist of bronze monumental statues. It was placed on the grounds of the Education Department, site of the old Normal School founded by Ryerson and the first teacher training college in Canada. It was unveiled by the lieutenant-governor, Sir Alexander Campbell, on the Queen's birthday, 24 May 1889. The chancellors of four universities attended (Queen's, Trinity, McMaster and Victoria), the mayor of Toronto and other officials. There was a scripture reading and a hymn, "All People that on Earth do dwell." The location would later be the site of Ryerson University.

In 1950, it was proposed to move the statue to Queen's Park by Keith Balfour, a Toronto mining company executive. The proposed move was opposed by the students of Ryerson Institute of Technology. The statue was cleaned annually by new students with toothbrushes as an initiation exercise.

On 18 July 2020, three people were arrested for splattering pink paint on the statue – in addition to two others of John A. Macdonald and King Edward VII at the Ontario Legislature – as part of a demand to tear down the monuments. Black Lives Matter Toronto claimed responsibility for the actions stating that "The action comes after the City of Toronto and the Province of Ontario have failed to take action against police violence against Black people." Three people were each charged with three counts of mischief under $5,000 and conspiracy to commit a summary offence; the charges were dropped the following year.

On 1 June 2021, following the discovery of soil disturbances at the Kamloops Indian Residential School, widely reported by the media as sites of 215 unmarked graves, the statue was vandalized again, this time with red paint. On 6 June, the statue was toppled, decapitated and thrown into Toronto Harbour; Ryerson University stated that the statue will not be restored or replaced. The head of the statue was subsequently placed on a pike at the Six Nations of the Grand River near Caledonia, Ontario.

On 26 April 2022, Ryerson University announced its renaming to Toronto Metropolitan University. The statue's location has since been cleared and cleaned.

== Personal life ==
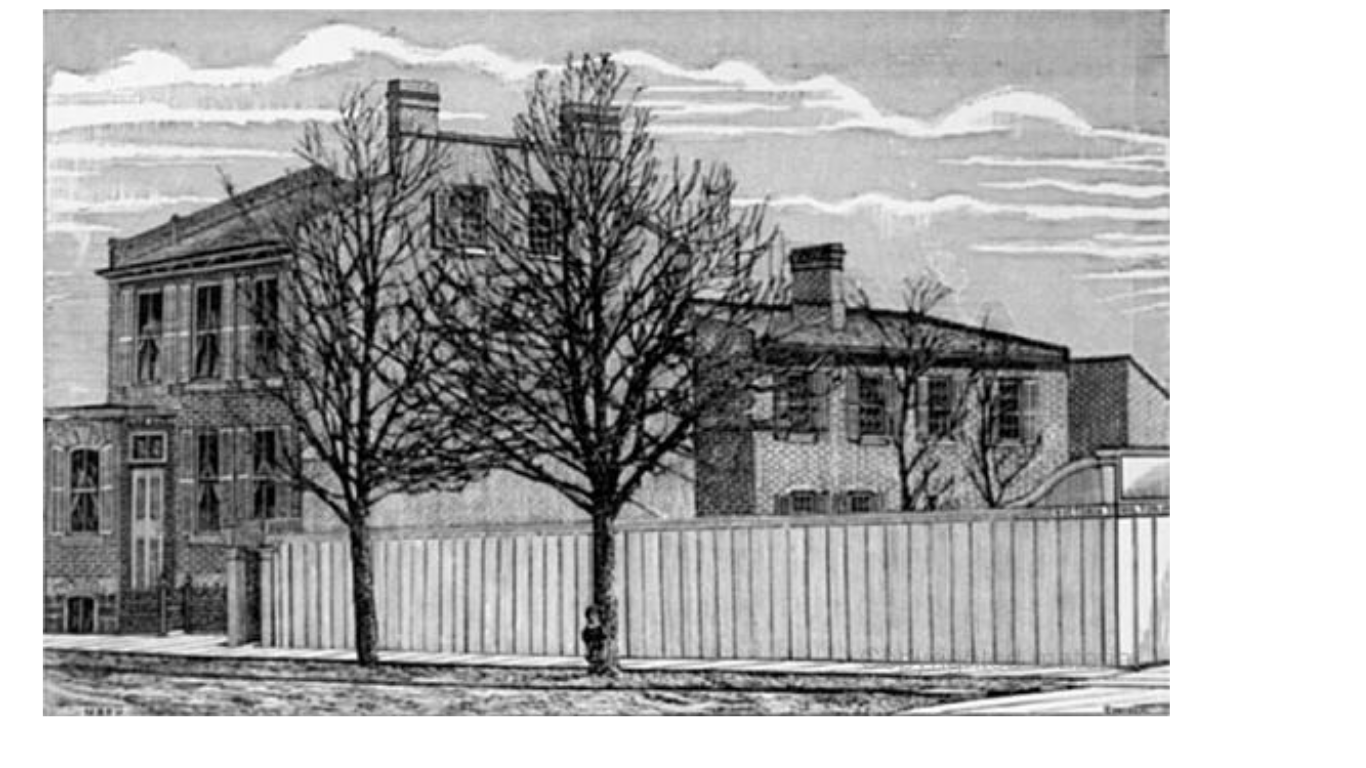
Ryerson's home on Victoria Street

Ryerson was married twice and had several children. In 1828, he married Hannah Aikman. She died in 1832, soon after the birth of their second child. Their children were John and Lucilla Hannah. John died of dysentery in 1835 at age six, and Lucilla died of consumption (tuberculosis) in 1849 at age 17.

In 1833, Ryerson married Mary Armstrong in York (Toronto). Together they had two children, Sophia in 1836 and Charles Egerton in 1847:

- Charles Egerton Ryerson (1847–1909) – secretary-treasurer and assistant librarian of Toronto; his children with Emily Eliza Beatty (1848–1947) were:
  - Egerton Ryerson (1876–?), a missionary priest in Japan
  - Edward Stanley Ryerson (1879–1963)
    - Stanley Bréhaut Ryerson (1911–1998), historian and Communist politician
  - Mary Ella Ryerson (1882–1983)
  - Isabel Louise Ryerson (1884–1954)
  - John Egerton Ryerson (1887–1916)
- Sophia Ryerson Harris (1836–1898)

Ryerson retired in 1876. His book The Loyalists of America and Their Times on the United Empire Loyalists was published in 1881. He died on 19 February 1882 after an extended illness. Schools were closed and flags were lowered to half-staff in his honour. His funeral at the Metropolitan Wesleyan Methodist Church was attended by the Lieutenant-Governor of Ontario John Beverley Robinson, members of the Legislative Assembly of Ontario, officials of the Methodist Church and officials of Victoria College. He was buried in Mount Pleasant Cemetery, Toronto.

Ryerson lived nearby to the Normal School, at the-then 171 Victoria Street just north of today's Dundas Street. After his death, the building was used by his son's family and eventually sold. In 1923, the building was extensively modified to allow the connection of Dundas Street in front and also for commercial use. It is not known if any of the original residence survived. After sitting vacant, the building was demolished in 2024.
