= SS C. F. Curtis =

American steam barge wrecked on Lake Superior in 1914

Coordinates: 47°2′10.8″N 85°54′16.8″W

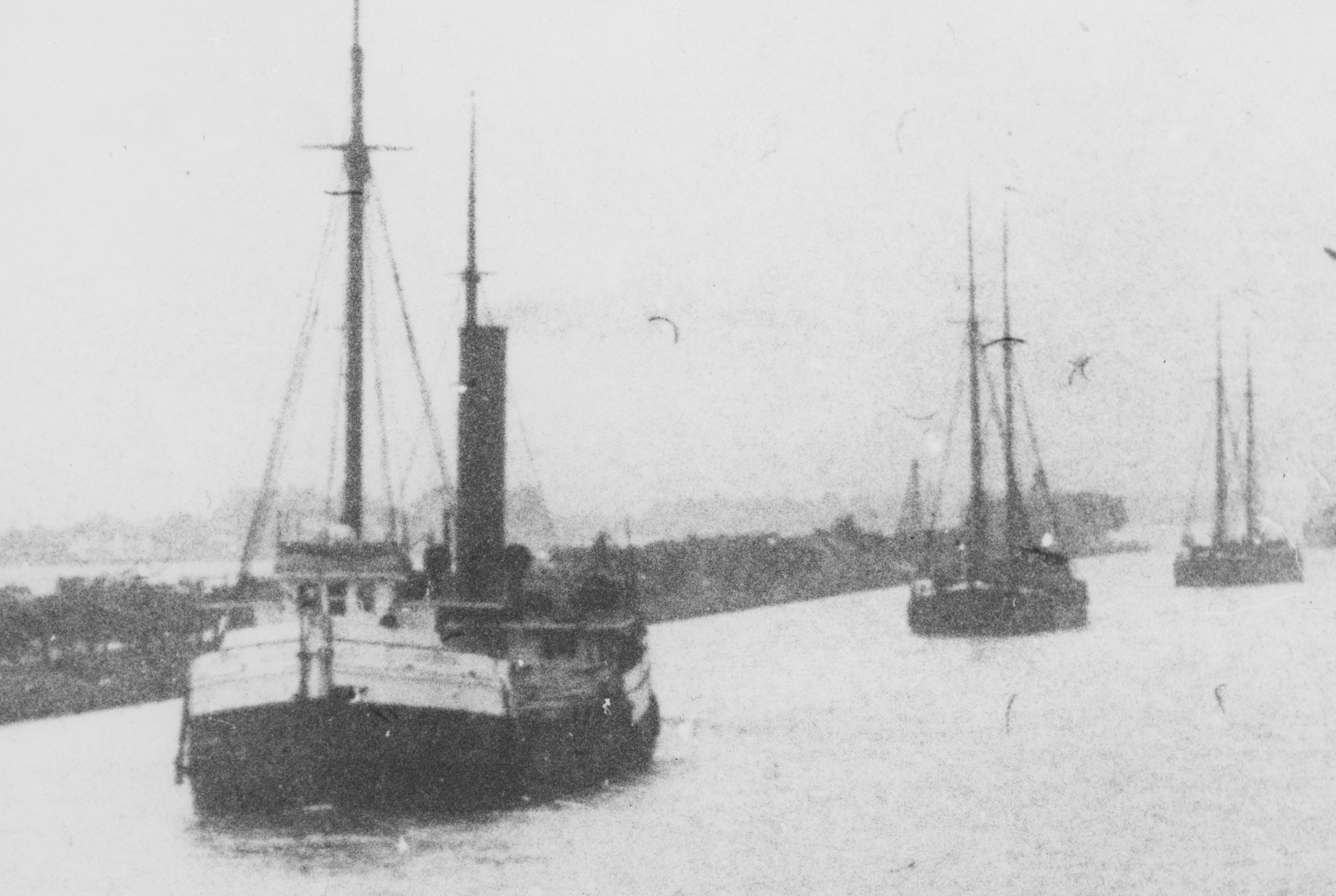
- C. F. Curtis with two schooner–barges c. 1900

History

United States
- Name: C. F. Curtis
- Owner: Edward Hines Lumber Company
- Port of registry: Chicago, Illinois
- Builder: David Lester, Marine City, Michigan
- Launched: 1882
- Out of service: 19 November 1914
- Identification: US official number 34126
- Fate: Sank in a storm on Lake Superior

General characteristics
- Class & type: Steam barge
- Tonnage: 532.42 GRT; 425.03 NRT
- Length: 174 feet (53.0 m)
- Beam: 32.9 feet (10.0 m)
- Depth: 14 feet (4.3 m)
- Installed power: Engine: 1 × 2–cylinder 485 ihp (362 kW) 85 RPM fore and aft compound steam engine; Boiler(s): 1 × 120 pounds per square inch (830 kPa) firebox boiler
- Propulsion: 1 × propeller
- Crew: 14

SS C. F. Curtis was a wooden–hulled American steam barge built in 1882, in Marine City, Michigan. Originally built as a barge, she was fitted with machinery at the end of 1882, before resuming service the following year. She operated on the Great Lakes for 32 years, before sinking in a storm on Lake Superior on 19 November 1914, while towing the schooner-barges Selden E. Marvin and Annie M. Peterson. Her wreck was discovered 20 miles (32.2 km) off Grand Marais, Michigan, in 500 feet (152.4 m) of water in 2021.

== History ==
C. F. Curtis (US official number 34126) was a wooden steam barge, built shipwright David Lester in Marine City, Michigan, in 1882. Her hull was originally 174 feet 1 inch (53.1 m) in length, 32.9 feet (10.0 m) in beam, and 14 feet (4.3 m). She had a gross register tonnage of 532.42, and a net register tonnage of 425.03. C. F. Curtis's propulsion system consisted of a 485 ihp (362 kW) 85 RPM dual–cylinder fore and aft compound steam engine, with cylinders 26 inches (66.0 cm) and 48 inches (121.9 cm) in bore, with a 42-inch (1.1 m) stroke, built by the King Iron Works in Buffalo, New York, and a single 120 pounds per square inch (830 kPa) firebox boiler, manufactured by H. G. Trout of Buffalo. She was originally built as a barge, but received her engine and boiler between the end of 1882, and her return to service in 1883.

She was initially owned by the Toledo & Saginaw Transportation Company of Toledo, Ohio.

In November 1884, a gale drove C. F. Curtis aground near Huronia Beach, Port Huron, Michigan. In December 1886, she was rebuilt and lengthened by Dunford & Alverson in Port Huron. Her hull measurements were altered to 196.42 feet (59.9 m) in length, 32.33 feet (9.9 m) in beam, 13 feet (4.0 m) in depth, as well as 691 and 522 gross and net register tons, respectively.

She was sold to Nelson Holland of Buffalo, in 1887. Due to overloading, she sank at a dock in the Black River on 27 August, that year. The salvage necessitated the removal of her cargo by divers before she could be raised.

While laden with coal and towing the barges Theodore E. Fassett and Isabel Reed, C. F. Curtis was blown ashore by a severe gale near Cheboygan, Michigan, on 14 October 1893. C. F. Curtis was refloated following the removal of her cargo, by 17 October. On 16 May 1897, she ran aground on the Canadian side of the Niagara River, damaging a natural gas pipeline.

In 1899, C. F. Curtis was fitted with a new 120-pound-per-square-inch (830 kPa) firebox boiler manufactured by M. Ritter of Buffalo, and was sold to the Tonawanda Iron & Steel Company of North Tonawanda, New York.

On 22 June 1906, while downbound from Tonawanda, New York, and towing the schooner–barge Theodore E. Fassett, C. F. Curtis ran aground in the Niagara River, near Fort Erie, Ontario. She was freed on 24 June, having sustained no damage.

C. F. Curtis was sold to the Edward Hines Lumber Company of Chicago, Illinois, which became her home port, in 1910.

== Final voyage ==
On 18 November 1914, C. F. Curtis, towing the schooner–barges Selden E. Marvin and Annie M. Peterson, was headed for Tonawanda, from Baraga, Michigan, with a cargo of lumber in excess of 3 million board feet between them. Shortly after their departure, the three vessels encountered poor weather conditions, including strong winds, large waves, and heavy snow. All three vessels were lost, killing 28 people, 14 of them aboard C. F. Curtis.

Maritime historian Ric Mixter described the loss of the three vessels as "the nation's darkest day in lumber history".

== Wreck ==
In 2021, the Great Lakes Shipwreck Historical Society located the wreck of C. F. Curtis during an underwater survey. Her wreck rests in roughly 500 feet (152.4 m) of water, approximately 20 miles (32.2 km) off Grand Marais, Michigan. The name of the Edward Hines Lumber Company remains legible on her hull.
