= Curve Lake First Nation 35 =

- First Nation
- Curve Lake First Nation Indian Reserve No. 35
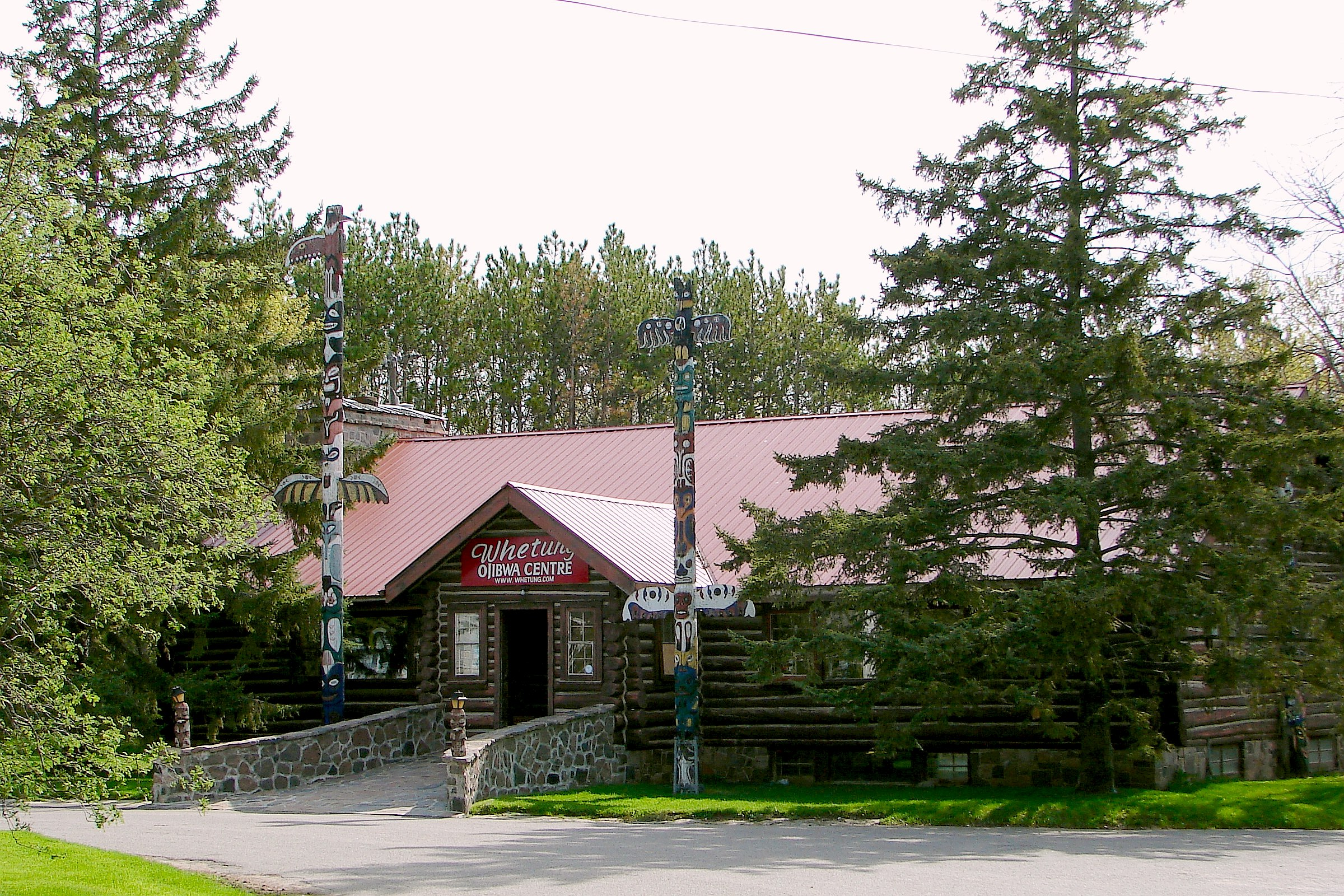

- Location within Peterborough County Location within Southern Ontario
- Coordinates: 44°29′N 78°22′W
- Country: Canada
- Province: Ontario
- District: Peterborough
- First Nation: Curve Lake

Area
  - Land: 6.62 km^{2} (2.56 sq mi)

Population (2011)
  - Total: 1,003
  - Density: 151.5/km^{2} (392/sq mi)
- Website: www.curvelakefirstnation.ca

Curve Lake First Nation 35 is an Anishinaabe reserve 14 km north of Peterborough, Ontario. It serves as the landbase for the Curve Lake First Nation. The reserve occupies a peninsula located between Lake Chemong and Buckhorn Lake, surrounded by the township of Selwyn, as well as several neighbouring small islands in Buckhorn Lake.

The Curve Lake First Nation occupies two reserves (including Curve Lake 35A) and shares a third, the nearby Islands in the Trent Waters, with the Hiawatha First Nation and the Scugog First Nation. Curve Lake First Nation 35 occupies a peninsula between Buckhorn Lake, Lake Chemong, and Little Mud Lake. Curve Lake 35A is on Fox Island in Buckhorn Lake, and Islands in the Trent Waters is on islands in Buckhorn Lake, Pigeon Lake and Stony Lake.

Manoomin (wild rice) is an annual plant that grows in the Kawartha Lakes. The seeds ripen in September and fall into the lake to ensure future crops.

== Famous Residents ==
- Elsie Knott: the first woman in Canada to be elected as Chief of a First Nation.
- Kris Jacobs: Triple AAA Hockey Goalie for Peterborough Petes
- Drew Hayden Taylor: Playwright
