= Curve Lake First Nation =

Mississauga Ojibway First Nation located in Peterborough County of Ontario

Coordinates: 44.4616°N 78.3706°W

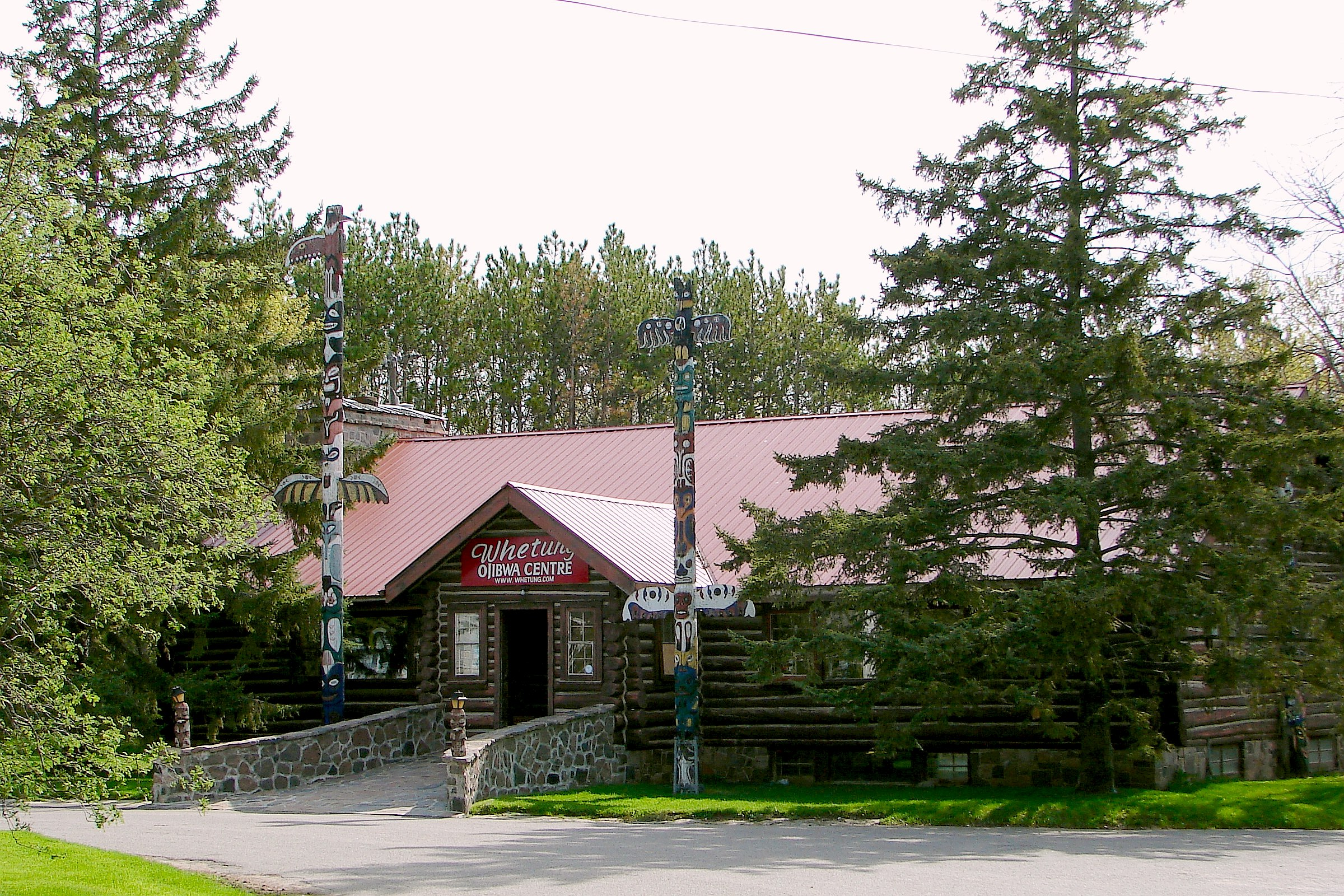
Curve Lake 35A reserve

Curve Lake First Nation (Ojibwe: Oshkiigmong) is a Mississauga Ojibway First Nation located in Peterborough County of Ontario. Curve Lake First Nation occupies three reserves; Curve Lake First Nation 35, Curve Lake 35A, and Islands in the Trent Waters Indian Reserve 36A. The last of these reserves is shared with the Hiawatha First Nation and the Scugog First Nation. Curve Lake First Nation has a registered membership of 2,415 as of October 2019 with 793 registered band members living in Curve Lake and an additional 1,622 registered band members living off-reserve.

== History ==
The Curve Lake Nation traces their origins to 1829 when a small Anishinaabe (Ojibway) band settled around Curve Lake and Mud Lake. The community officially became a reserve in 1889, called Mud Lake Band #35. It became Curve Lake First Nation #35 in 1964.

== Governance ==
Curve Lake First Nation adopted a custom election code after a community approval vote in 2015. The First Nation's council consists of a chief and eight councillors. The current chief is Laurie Hockaday. The councillors are Jeffrey Jacobs, Nodin Knott, Shelley Knott-Fife, Mindy Knott, Arnold Taylor, Courtney Taylor, Deborah Jacobs and Sean Conway. Their three-year term began in August 2025.

== Services ==
- Education
- Health and Family Services
- Economic Development
- Infrastructure & Housing
- Membership
- Lands
- Gaming Revenue Fund
- Employment Resource Centre
- Cultural Centre

== Notable people ==
- Elsie Knott, first known woman chief in Canada
- Albert Smoke (1894–1944), Olympic long-distance runner
- Drew Hayden Taylor, columnist and playwright
- Gidigaa Migizi (Doug Williams), former chief and negotiator for treaty rights
