= Point Peninsula complex =

Archaeological culture in North America

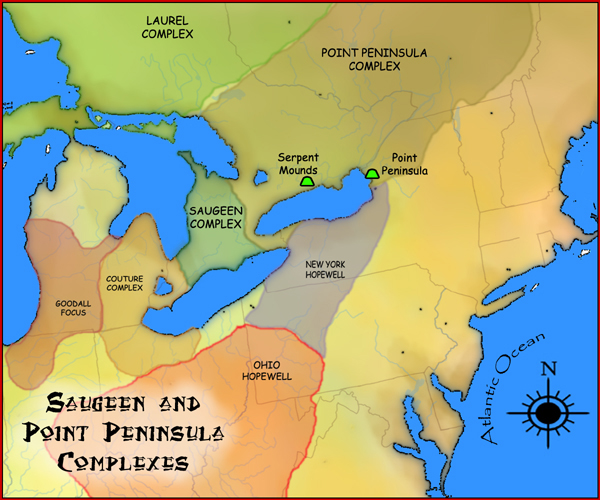
- Point Peninsula and Saugeen complexes
- Geographical range: Canada (southern Ontario), United States (northern New York)
- Period: Middle Woodland
- Dates: 600 BCE – 700 CE
- Type site: Serpent Mounds Park near Keene, Ontario, Canada; Lewiston Mound near Lewiston, New York

The Point Peninsula complex was an indigenous culture located in Ontario and New York from 600 BCE to 700 CE (during the Middle Woodland period). Point Peninsula ceramics were first introduced into Canada around 600 BCE then spread south into parts of New England around 200 BCE. Some time between 300 BCE and 1 CE, Point Peninsula pottery first appeared in Maine, and "over the entire Maritime Peninsula." Little evidence exists to show that it was derived from the earlier, thicker pottery, known as Vinette I, Adena Thick, etc... Point Peninsula pottery represented a new kind of technology in North America and has also been called Vinette II. Compared to existing ceramics that were thicker and less decorated, this new pottery has been characterized by "superior modeling of the clay with vessels being thinner, better fired and containing finer grit temper." Where this new pottery technology originated is not known for sure. The origin of this pottery is "somewhat of a problem." The people are thought to have been influenced by the Hopewell traditions of the Ohio River valley. This influence seems to have ended about 250 CE, after which they no longer practiced burial ceremonialism.

== Hopewell interaction sphere ==
The Hopewell exchange system began in the Ohio and Illinois River valleys about 300 BCE. The culture is referred to more as a system of interaction among a variety of societies than as a single society or culture. Hopewell trading networks were quite extensive, with obsidian from the Yellowstone area, copper from Lake Superior, and shells from the Gulf Coast. In some areas Point Peninsula people buried some of their dead in mortuary mounds. Interred with the dead were exotic grave goods, including copper and silver pan pipes, marine shell gorgets, and exotic cherts. The exotic goods among the burials may provide evidence for inherited status differentiation among Point Peninsula groups. Pan pipes, which have been found in burial mounds from Florida to Minnesota, considered to be a diagnostic trait within the Hopewell inventory, appear suddenly in North America around 200 BCE, then disappear as do certain other Hopewell traits, around 400 CE. Found mostly in the United States, nine pan pipes curiously appear in the LeVesconte mound, a Point Peninsula site located in Campbellford, Ontario. Though the Hopewell interaction sphere generally is confined to the United States, much of the silver found in mound artifacts, such as pan pipes, actually comes from Cobalt, Ontario, far up the Ottawa River.

== Point Peninsula complex ==
The Point Peninsula people of the Middle Woodland period lived by hunting and gathering, supplemented by agriculture. Around 900 CE, Point Peninsula artifacts in New York were replaced by Owasco culture artifacts. However, a 2011 paper by archaeologist John P. Hart argues there was no definable Owasco culture. Archaeologists believe these indicated the presence of Clemson Island peoples' spreading northward and intermingling with the Point Peninsula complex through the years of 1300.

The Owasco peoples practiced different pottery techniques and were more sedentary agriculturalists than the Point Peninsula people. They cultivated a variety of types of maize, squash, and eventually beans, and lived in larger villages of several hundred to a thousand people. Warfare was prevalent, as is shown by archeology. The people built fortified villages, but many still died violently. Gradually, smaller bands and tribes formed into larger groups. The Owasco are thought to have eventually developed into the several Iroquoian-speaking nations of Pennsylvania and New York. The Haudenosaunee or Iroquois Confederacy likely formed in an effort to avoid the continual warfare of years past.

Some important sites are the Rice Lake/Lower Trent River area, including the Serpent Mounds Park, Cameron's Point and LeVescounte Mounds in Prince Edward County.

=== Serpent Mounds Park ===
The Serpent Mounds Park at Rice Lake was occupied during the prehistoric Middle Woodland period. The burial mound was shaped like a giant snake.

== See also ==
- Lewiston Mound
- Hopewell tradition
- List of Hopewell sites
- Mound builder (people)
- Effigy mound
- Earthwork (archaeology)
- Princess Point complex
