= Albert Smoke =

Canadian long-distance runner

Personal information
- Born: March 1894 Smith Township, Peterborough, Ontario, Canada
- Died: December 17, 1944 (aged 50) Lindsay, Ontario, Canada

Sport
- Sport: Long-distance running
- Event: Marathon

Albert Smoke (March 1894 – December 17, 1944) was a Canadian long-distance runner who competed in the marathon at the 1920 Summer Olympics.

Smoke, a Mississauga Anishinaabe First Nations member, was born in 1894 and raised at Curve Lake. He was 4'10", and considered amongst the best long-distance runners of his era. He was the national marathon champion from 1920 to 1922, and finished in third place at the 1922 Boston Marathon. He later moved to Lindsay, Ontario, where he died in 1944 at the age of 53. He was inducted into the Peterborough and District Sports Hall of Fame & Museum in 1988.
