= Serpent Mounds Park =

Provincial park in Ontario, Canada

- Tumulus Serpent; Serpent Mounds complex; Serpent Mounds National Historic Site of Canada
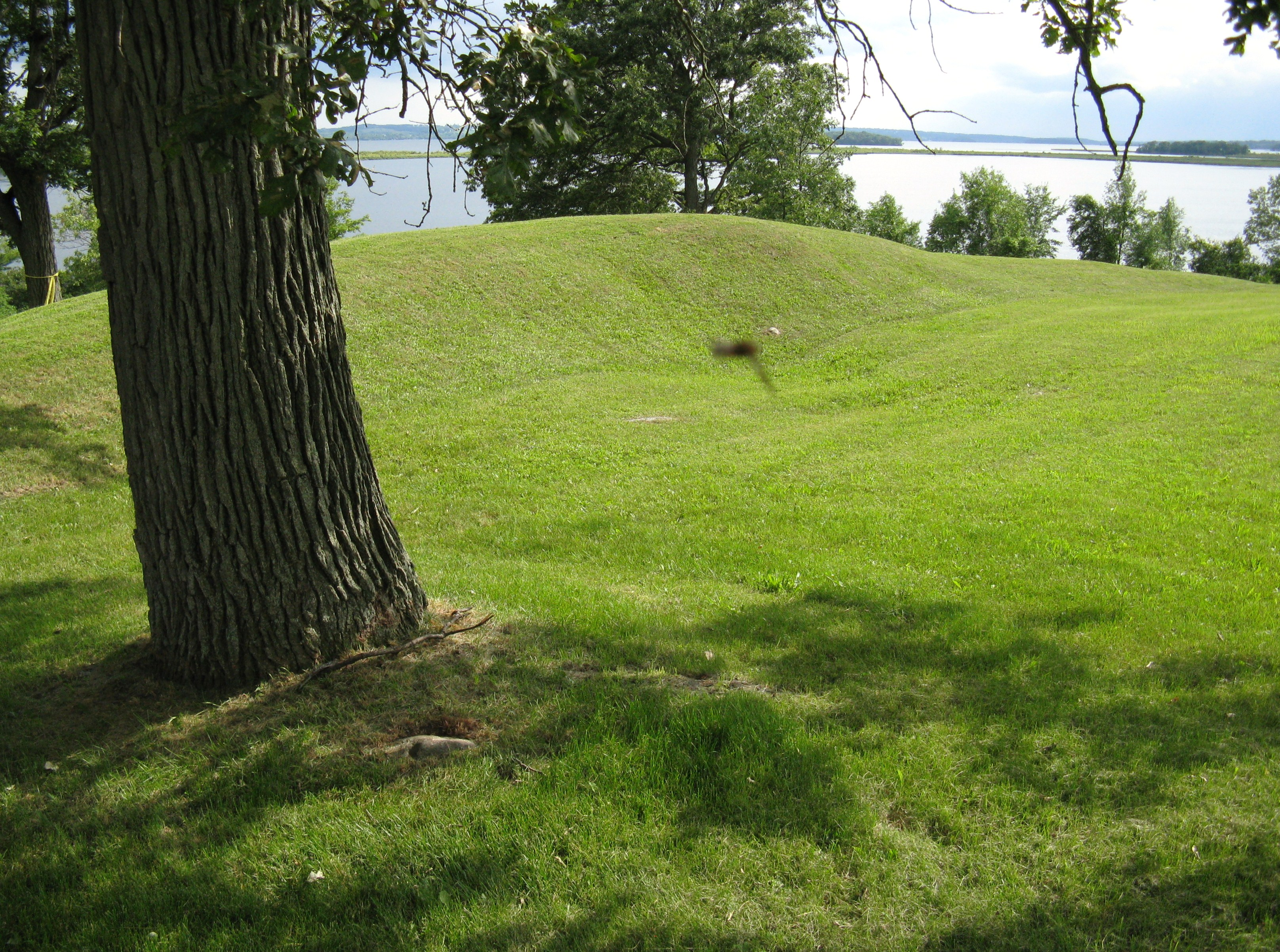
- Burial mounds like these inspired the name of the park due to their curves resembling movement of a serpent.
- Interactive map of Serpent Mounds Park
- Location: Keene, Ontario, Canada
- Nearest city: Peterborough, Ontario
- Coordinates: 44°12′33″N 78°09′17″W
- Area: 1.35 km^{2} (0.52 sq mi)
- Opened: 1955
- Closed: 2009; 17 years ago
- Operator: Ontario Parks (1955–1995); Hiawatha First Nation (1995–2009)
- Status: Closed due to decline in tourism and failing infrastructure

National Historic Site of Canada
- Designated: June 12, 1982; 43 years ago
- Statute: Historic Sites and Monuments Act

IUCN Category III (Natural Monument)
- Designated: 1957; 69 years ago
- WDPA ID: 19782

Serpent Mounds Park is a historical place located near Keene, Ontario, Canada. Serpent Mounds operated as a provincial park, established in 1955 through a lease with the Hiawatha First Nation, of the Michi Saagiig (Mississauga Anishinaabeg). In 1982, while operating as a provincial park the mounds were designated a National Historic Site, including East Sugar Island.

From 1995 to 2009, Hiawatha First Nation operated the park privately, offering camping facilities, beach access on Rice Lake, a cultural center, and interpretive walks among the historic serpent and nearby mounds. The park was closed to the public in 2009, due to the decline in the tourism and deteriorating infrastructure.

== History ==
Archaeological field work revealed that the construction and early occupation of the serpent mounds area occurred about 2000 years ago during the prehistoric Middle Woodland Period. The first prehistoric peoples to occupy the site were classified by archaeologists as the Point Peninsula complex, based on their artifacts.

The people gathered in areas of what are now the jurisdictions of central and southeastern Ontario and southwestern Quebec in Canada, and northern parts of New York state in the United States, to camp, hunt, fish, collect fresh water mussels, and to harvest manoomin back to 58 BC.

The nine earthen mounds located on Roach's Point were disclosed as places to bury the dead and revere the ancestors providing an exceptionally complete record of life for a period of 350 years ending about C.E.. 300; the burial mound shaped like a serpent is the only one of its kind in Canada.

Serpent Mounds incorporates a 4.4-hectare area, as well as a 49-hectare area on East Sugar Island. The designated site comprises six distinct areas of archaeological interest, including the Serpent Mounds site, the Alderville site, the Island Centre site, the East Sugar Island site, the Corral site and an unnamed Site.

The largest mound, known as "the serpent" for its winding outline, is 194 ft (59.1 m) long, 25 ft (7.6 m) wide, 5 to 6 ft (1.5 to 1.8 m) high, and is the only one in Canada.

The eight oval/round mounds known as "the serpents eggs" range between 23 and 48 ft (7.0 to 14.6 m) long, 1 to 4.5 ft (0.4 to 1.6 m) high. Significant items found inside the mounds, in addition to human remains, were shell disc beads, fossilized coral, fish bone hook, flint chips, copper foil beads, carved limestone, adze, and numerous types of animal bones.

== Nearby ==
Serpent Mounds Park activities close by, include::

- The Old Railroad Stop
- Birdwatching
- Swimming
- Fishing
- Boating

== See also ==
- Earthwork (archaeology)
- Effigy mound
- List of National Historic Sites in Ontario
- Mound
- Mound builder (people)
- Serpent Mound, a similar effigy mound in Ohio, USA

== Literature ==
- J.E. Anderson, The Serpent Mounds Site: Physical Anthropology. Royal Ontario Museum, 1968. ROM Archaeology.
- R.B. Johnston, The Archaeology of the Serpent Mounds Site. Royal Ontario Museum, 1968. ROM Archaeology.
- W.A. Kenyon, Mounds of Sacred Earth - Burial Mounds of Ontario. Royal Ontario Museum, 1986. ROM Archaeology Monograph 9. ISBN 0-88854-303-4
