= Gidigaa Migizi =

Anishinaabe elder and author (1942–2022)

Gidigaa Migizi (Douglas "Doug" Williams) was an Anishinaabe Elder, professor, chief, storyteller, ceremonialist, pipe carrier and author. He is best known for his community leadership in Peterborough, Curve Lake First Nation and the wider Nishnaabeg Nation, work in the field of Indigenous studies and with Trent University, and his role in a landmark court case asserting First Nations hunting and fishing rights.

== Life ==
=== Early life ===
Doug was born in 1942 in Curve Lake First Nation. His mother was Amelia Williams and he was raised by a strong matriarchal circle, including many of his mother's sisters and her mother Adeline Taylor. He was primarily raised by his nokomis (grandmother). He spent time with the old people of his community and was raised being a shcaabawis (helper) to his great uncle Madden. Through this connection, Doug was exposed to and absorbed the oral and lived knowledge of his ancestors, carrying a traditional world view that he followed throughout his life. He knew the old language (Anishinaabemowin), teachings and the way of his ancestors which enabled him to live and thrive off the land.

Williams was a part of the Pike Clan, specifically the Musky Pike, or Maashginoozhe. In his adulthood he was given the name, Gitigaa Migizi, which means spotted eagle in Anishinaabemowin.

=== Community Leadership ===
Williams had a successful political career, serving as Chief and as a band councillor of Curve Lake First Nation for many decades. Beyond politics, he held the highest honours within Anishnaabeg spirituality as a pipe-keeper and a leader of sweat lodges and other spiritual ceremonies. He was gifted with the ability to provide spirit names, guide fasts and interpret petroglyphs. At his home in Curve Lake, Williams was known to conduct birthing and naming ceremonies.

=== R v. Williams and Taylor ===
Gidigaa Migizi was an active negotiator for formal, legal recognition of treaty rights. His greatest accomplishment in this arena is the advocacy work he undertook by working through the court system to bringing legal recognition to pre-confederation treaty rights through the interpretation of Treaty 20, 1818.

On June 11, 1977, Williams was bull frogging on Crowe Lake on the Hastings County side with his son Keesic and best friend Wayne Bear (Taylor). Game wardens arrived and told them it was illegal to kill bullfrogs because of an Ontario law passed the year before, but Williams argued that the law did not apply because they had treaty rights. The Game Wardens took six frogs for evidence, letting the rest go, and wrote them a ticket to appear in court. As the Chief of Curve Lake, Williams was determined to fight in court on the basis of First Nations treaty rights. With his friend Wayne, he won a landmark court case (R. v Williams and Taylor) recognizing the oral promises enshrined in treaties for all Ontario First Nations to hunt and fish in their own territories. This is said to be the first time in Canada that the Oral Tradition was used as evidence in a court case. As a result of this landmark case, he defended the right to hunt and fish for signatories to the Williams Treaties.

=== Trent University ===
Prior to joining Trent University as a student and then as a faculty member, Gidigaa Migizi was a bricklayer who helped build Champlain College. In 1972, he became one of the first graduates of what is now called Indigenous Studies at Trent University, a program he had petitioned the university to establish. He was co-director of the Indigenous Studies Ph.D. program, overseeing the cultural elements of the program. He also served as a professor with the Chanie Wenjack School for Indigenous Studies at Trent and served on the University's Indigenous Education Committee and the Elders & Traditional Knowledge Keepers Council.

One of his last public appearances was on September 30, 2021- the inaugural National Day for Truth and Reconciliation- for the unveiling of a 'treaty rock' installation in recognition of the treaty lands upon which the university is located.

=== Michi Saagiig Nishnaabeg: This is our Territory ===
In 2018, Williams penned "Michi Saagiig Nishnaabeg: This is our Territory," edited by Peterborough-based singer-songwriter, novelist and activist Leanne Betasamosake Simpson. Williams wanted to write a something "born of Nishnaabeg thought, remembering, storytelling, years of transferring knowledge from generation to generation, and a long mentorship with two Elders who remembered into the 1700s". According to Williams, "Indigenous Knowledge is still not considered a valid form of knowledge in many disciplines", which has political consequences.

Michi Saagiig Nishnaabeg: This is our Territory includes transcribed recordings, interviews and conversations, and previously published writing. Some chapter titles include 'Michi Saagiig Nishnaabeg Creation Story', 'The Williams Treaty', 'The Construction of the Trent Severn Waterway', 'Bullfrogs', and 'Every Speck of Dust Has Been Raised By Our Feet'.

== Legacy ==
Williams died at Peterborough Regional Health Centre on July 13, 2022 at the age of 81.

In 2021, the Peterborough Historical Society honoured Williams with its Thomas H.B and Christine Symons Heritage Award for a "lifetime of preserving the oral history and traditions of the Michi Saagiig Nishnaabeg, and educating students and the public, both Indigenous and settler, of this rich heritage in the greater region of Nogojiwanong – Peterborough".

Prior to his passing, Trent University awarded Williams the 2022 Distinguished Alumni Award for his contributions to Trent University and to the Anishnaabeg Nation.

In November 2023, Trent University announced that their sixth College would be named Gidigaa Migizi College in his honour.
