= Freek Vrugtman =

Canadian botanist and horticulturist

Freek Vrugtman (6 July 1927 – 3 March 2022) was a Canadian botanist and horticulturist. Vrugtman was Curator at both University of British Columbia Botanical Garden in Vancouver, British Columbia, and Royal Botanical Gardens (RBG) in Burlington, Ontario, Canada. For 45 years he served as the International Registrar for Hybrid Cultivars of Lilacs in the Genus Syringa.

== Early life ==
Vrugtman was born on 6 July 1927 in Rotterdam, The Netherlands. His early education was interrupted by World War II. After the war he apprenticed at a tree nursery and then trained in gardening in Germany. He emigrated to Canada in 1952 and first worked on a farm in Donegal, Ontario and then as a gardener at Manitoba’s Morden Research and Development Centre. He crisscrossed the country to follow opportunities, becoming a nurseryman in Ocean Park, British Columbia, a gardener at the Dominion Arboretum in Ottawa, Ontario, and a landscape foreman for a paper mill in Quebec.

== Education ==
Vrugtman completed a Bachelor of Science and Arts (BSA) degree at University of British Columbia in 1963 with a major in ornamental horticulture and plant taxonomy. He earned his Master of Science degree at Cornell University in Ithaca, New York.

== Career ==
Vrugtman was appointed Curator of the University of British Columbia Botanic Garden in 1956. Following studies in the US and Europe with his wife Ina (née van Teunenbroek), he joined the staff of Royal Botanical Gardens in Hamilton and Burlington, Ontario in February 1968 as the first Curator of Collections, with responsibility for the horticultural collections and gardens, and their expansion, taxonomy and documentation. He paid particular attention to woody plant collections. The Lilac collection in the Katie Osborne Lilac Garden had just been moved to the RBG Arboretum and expanded thanks to a legacy gift from Hamilton businessman Colin Osborne in memory of his wife Katie.

Working with RBG's other staff, including Charles Holetich and Dr. Leslie Laking, Vrugtman directed considerable attention to the collection and was appointed the International Registrar for Lilacs in the Genus Syringa in 1976, as RBG was named the International Cultivar Registration Authority (ICRA) for Lilacs. Whenever a new cultivar was bred anywhere in the world the breeder would submit a request to the Registrar entry into the International Registry. Vrugtman would review all such applications and guide the breeder through the process. As Registrar he became widely known as the international expert on Lilac cultivars, as well as serving as Registrar for Cultivar Names for Unassigned Woody Genera.

Vrugtman's professional service to horticultural science spread far beyond Lilacs, and beyond RBG. He participated in dozens of initiatives within horticultural science and botanical gardens and helped edit several editions of the International Code of Nomenclature for Cultivated Plants (ICNCP). He was also a part-time lecturer for landscape architecture courses at the University of Toronto and undertook research and advised other institutions in Germany, China, and the Philippines.

Following retirement in 1992 Vrugtman was named RBG's Curator Emeritus, and received several awards from the International Society for Horticultural Science (ISHA) and the International Lilac Society (ILS) as well as the 1993 Award of Merit from the American Public Gardens Association. He continued to serve as International Registrar as a volunteer, finally handing off the role the ILS in May 2019. Vrugtman also undertook a major revision of John Fiala's classic book Lilacs: A Gardener’s Encyclopedia, published in 2008 by Timber Press. Vrugtman died in Hamilton, Ontario, Canada, in 2022.

== Awards and honors ==
- 1962 W. Jack H. Dicks Bursary, University of British Columbia
- 1963 Biely-Coulthard Trophy, University of British Columbia
- 1963 Vancouver Natural History Society Prize, Vancouver Natural History Society (now Nature Vancouver)
- 1964 Elected member of Pi Alpha Xi, Alpha Chapter, National Honorary Fraternity in Floriculture and Ornamental Horticulture, Cornell University
- 1966/67 William F. Dreer Travelling Scholarship, Cornell University
- 1966/67 International Agricultural Centre Fellowship, Wageningen, The Netherlands
- 1967 British Council Grant, United Kingdom
- 1967 Deutscher akademischer Austauschdienst Grant, Federal Republic of Germany
- 1974 Deutscher akademischer Austauschdienst Fellowship, Federal Republic of Germany
- 1993 Award of Merit, American Association of Botanical Gardens and Arboreta (now American Public Gardens Association)
- 1997 Directors Award, [International Lilac Society
- 2000 Honors & Achievement Award, International Lilac Society
- 2002 ISHS Medal, International Society for Horticultural Science
- 2019 Lifetime Achievement Award, International Lilac Society

== Bibliography ==
- Ehrhardt, Walter; Vrugtman, Freek (2009). "Falscher Flieder". Gartenpraxis. 2009 (4): 4–5.
- Fiala, John L.; Vrugtman, Freek (2008). Lilacs: A Gardener's Encyclopaedia. Revised and updated edition. Portland, OR: Timber Press. ISBN 978-0881927955.
- Pringle, James S.; Vrugtman, Freek (1991). "Syringa prestoniae 'Elinor' alias S. vulgaris 'Leonore'". Lilacs. 20: 112.
- Tucker, A. O.; Kunst, S. G.; Vrugtman, F.; Hatch, L. C. (1995). "A sourcebook of cultivar names". Arnoldia. 54: 1–64.
- Tylor, Thomas M. C.; Vrugtman, Freek (1994). "Daphne × Mantensiana and cv. 'Manten' -- validation of the name of a hybrid". Baileya. 12: 39–42.
- Vrugtman, Freek (1963). "Origin of Daphne × Burkwoodii and cv. 'Somerset'". Baileya. 11: 1–3.
- Vrugtman, Freek (1972). "Bibliography of cultivar name registration". Chronica Horticulturae. 12 (3): 47–50.
- Vrugtman, Freek (1973). "Bibliography of cultivar name registration, Addendum 1". Chronica Horticulturae. 13 (3): 54.
- Vrugtman, Freek (1977). "Bibliography of cultivar name registration, Addendum 2". Chronica Horticulturae. 17 (3): 29–30.
- Vrugtman, Freek (1979). "Lilac registrations". Lilacs. 6 (1): 14–17.
- Vrugtman, Freek (1979). "Lilac registrations". Lilacs. 7 (1): 35–37.
- Vrugtman, Freek (1979). "Lilac registrations 1976, 1977, and 1978". Bulletin of the American Association of Botanical Gardens and Arboreta. 13: 105–110.
- Vrugtman, Freek (1980). "Lilac registration 1979". Bulletin of the American Association of Botanical Gardens and Arboreta. 14: 95.
- Vrugtman, Freek (1981). "Bibliography of cultivar name registration, Addendum 3". Chronica Horticulturae. 21 (3): 29–31.
- Vrugtman, Freek (1981). "Lilac registration 1980". Bulletin of the American Association of Botanical Gardens and Arboreta. 15: 71–72.
- Vrugtman, Freek (1981). "Lilac registrations 1978 & 1979". Lilacs. 9: 26–27.
- Vrugtman, Freek (1982). "Lilac Registrations 1981". Bulletin of the American Association of Botanical Gardens and Arboreta. 16: 131–132.
- Vrugtman, Freek (1982). "James Dougall, 1810-1888". Lilacs. 11 (1): 28–32.
- Vrugtman, Freek (1984). "Directory of International Registration Authorities for cultivar names". Chronica Horticulturae. 24 (1): 4–6.
- Vrugtman, Freek (1984). "August Henry Lemke, 1868-1946". Lilacs. 12 (1): 18–21.
- Vrugtman, Freek (1984). "Lilac Registrations 1982". Bulletin of the American Association of Botanical Gardens and Arboreta. 17: 67–69.
- Vrugtman, Freek (1984). "Lilac Registration 1983". Bulletin of the American Association of Botanical Gardens and Arboreta. 18: 87.
- Vrugtman, Freek (1985). "Directory of International Registration Authorities for cultivar names. Addenda & Corrigenda". Chronica Horticulturae. 25 (3): 42.
- Vrugtman, Freek (1986). Directory of International Registration Authorities for cultivar names. Further Addenda & Corrigenda (Report). Royal Botanical Gardens.
- Vrugtman, Freek (1986). "The history of cultivar name registration in North America". Acta Horticulturae. 182 (182): 225–228. doi:10.17660/ActaHortic.1986.182.27.
- Vrugtman, Freek (1988). "Lilac registration 1986-1987". HortScience. 23: 458.
- Vrugtman, Freek (1989). "Lilac registration 1988". HortScience. 24: 435–436.
- Vrugtman, Freek (1989). "Corrigenda. Lilac registration 1986-1987". HortScience. 24: 436.
- Vrugtman, Freek (1989). Directory of International Registration Authorities for cultivar names: Further Addenda & Corrigenda (Report). Royal Botanical Gardens.
- Vrugtman, Freek (1990). "Lilac registration 1989". HortScience. 25: 618. doi:10.21273/HORTSCI.25.6.618.
- Vrugtman, Freek (1990). "Directory of International Registration Authorities for cultivar names". HortScience. 25 (6): 618–621. doi:10.21273/HORTSCI.25.6.618.
- Vrugtman, Freek (1990). "Directory of International Registration Authorities for cultivar names". Chronica Botanica. 30: 60–62.
- Vrugtman, Freek (1990). Addenda & corrigenda to the "Tentative International Register of Cultivar Names in the Genus Syringa L." (1976) (Report). Hamilton, Ontario, Canada: Royal Botanical Gardens. pp. v+72pp.
- Vrugtman, Freek (1990). "Directory of International Registration Authorities for cultivar names". Chronica Horticulturae. 30: 60–62.
- Vrugtman, Freek (1990). "Addenda & corrigenda". Chronica Horticulturae. 31: 41.
- Vrugtman, Freek (1991). "Lilac registration 1990". HortScience. 26 (5): 476–477. doi:10.21273/HORTSCI.26.5.476b.
- Vrugtman, Freek (1994). "International registration of cultivar names for unassigned woody genera 1993". HortScience. 29 (9): 970–971. doi:10.21273/HORTSCI.29.9.970.
- Vrugtman, Freek (1994). "Lilac registration 1993". HortScience. 29 (9): 972. doi:10.21273/HORTSCI.29.9.972.
- Vrugtman, Freek (1994). "Directory of International Registration Authorities for cultivar names (IRAs), [ed. 2]". American Association of Botanical Gardens and Arboreta Newsletter. 236: 7–10.
- Vrugtman, Freek (1995). "Directory of international registration authorities for cultivar names (IRAs)". Acta Horticulturae. 413 (413): 187–193. doi:10.17660/ActaHortic.1995.413.29.
- Vrugtman, Freek (1996). "Lilac registrations 1995". HortScience. 31 (3): 327–328. doi:10.21273/HORTSCI.31.3.327.
- Vrugtman, Freek (1997). "Lilac registrations 1996". HortScience. 32: 587–588. doi:10.21273/HORTSCI.32.4.587B.
- Vrugtman, Freek (1998). "Lilac registrations 1997". HortScience. 33: 588–589. doi:10.21273/HORTSCI.33.4.588b.
- Vrugtman, Freek (1998). "The international register". Lilacs. 27: 108–113.
- Vrugtman, Freek (1999). "Lilac cultivar name registrations 1998". HortScience. 34 (4): 600. doi:10.21273/HORTSCI.34.4.600.
- Vrugtman, Freek (2000). "Lilac cultivar name registrations 1999". HortScience. 35 (4): 549. doi:10.21273/HORTSCI.35.4.549.
- Vrugtman, Freek (2000). "Lilac cultivar name registrations 2000". HortScience. 36: 836.
- Vrugtman, Freek (2001). "Lilac cultivar name registrations 1999". Lilacs. 30: 50–52.
- Vrugtman, Freek (2002). "Lilac cultivar name registrations 2001". HortScience. 37: 1145.
- Vrugtman, Freek (2003). "Lilac cultivar name registrations 2002". HortScience. 38 (6): 1301. doi:10.21273/HORTSCI.38.6.1301.
- Vrugtman, Freek (2004). "Lilac cultivar name registrations 2003". HortScience. 39 (6): 1524. doi:10.21273/HORTSCI.39.6.1524.
- Vrugtman, Freek (2004). "From the registrar's desk: Syringa pubescens subsp. patula 'De Belder' De Belder & Fiala 1988: S IV". Lilacs. 33: 123.
- Vrugtman, Freek (2005). "Syringa reticulata subsp. pekinensis 'Jin Yuan', a new Cultivar from China". Lilacs - Quarterly Journal. 34 (1): 12–13.
- Vrugtman, Freek (2005). "Lilac cultivar name registrations 2003. (reprinted from HortScience 39(6):1524 [October 2004])". Lilacs - Quarterly Journal. 34 (1): 13–15.
- Vrugtman, Freek (2005). "News Flash (Lilac blooming dates in Moscow and Finland)". Lilacs - Quarterly Journal. 34 (3): 72–73.
- Vrugtman, Freek (2005). "John Wister's Lilacs for America". Lilacs - Quarterly Journal. 34 (4): 105.
- Vrugtman, Freek (2005). "Lilac Alert". Lilacs - Quarterly Journal. 34 (4): 106.
- Vrugtman, Freek (2005). "Lilac Cultivar Name Registration 2004". HortScience. 40 (6): 1597. doi:10.21273/HORTSCI.40.6.1597.
- Vrugtman, Freek (2007). "From the Registrar's Desk". Lilacs - Quarterly Journal. 36 (1): 20–22.
- Vrugtman, Freek (2007). "Lilac Cultivar Name Registration 2005". HortScience. 42 (1): 5. doi:10.21273/HORTSCI.42.1.5.
- Vrugtman, Freek (2007). "From the Registrar's Desk". Lilacs - Quarterly Journal. 36 (2): 75–77.
- Vrugtman, Freek (2007). "From the Registrar's Desk". Lilacs - Quarterly Journal. 36 (3): 117–118.
- Vrugtman, Freek (2007). "Cultivar name registration–an information resource. Poster". 5th Symposium on the Taxonomy of Cultivated Plants - Abstract Book. 5th Symposium on the Taxonomy of Cultivated Plants. Wageningen University, The Netherlands. p. 33.
- Vrugtman, Freek (2008). International Register and Checklist of Cultivar Names in the Genus Syringa L. (Report). Hamilton, Ontario, Canada: Royal Botanical Gardens.
- Vrugtman, Freek (2008). "Lilac Cultivar Name Registration 2007. HortScience". 43 (3): 589.
- Vrugtman, Freek (2008). "From the Registrar's Desk. Lilacs - Quarterly Journal". 37 (1): 17–20.
- Vrugtman, Freek (2008). "International Lilac Registrar Report for 2007. Lilacs - Quarterly Journal". 37 (3): 79–80.
- Vrugtman, Freek (2008). "Prairie Lilacs–A Historical View". The 2009 Prairie Garden. 2009: 3–8 & 90.
- Vrugtman, Freek; Peart, Bruce (2009). "Corrections to a Popular Lilac Book". Lilacs - Quarterly Journal. 38 (2): 59–60.
- Vrugtman, Freek (2009). "Syringa oblata 'Giraldii' – old name, new perspective". Lilacs - Quarterly Journal. 38 (2): 60–63.
- Vrugtman, Freek (2009). "Do you have Syringa afghanica growing in your collection?". Lilacs - Quarterly Journal. 38 (2): 64–65.
- Vrugtman, Freek (2009). "Who has the real 'Susan B. Anthony'?". Lilacs - Quarterly Journal. 38 (2): 65.
- Vrugtman, Freek (2009). "Syringa afghanica and S. pinetorum – A misidentification alert". Hanburyana. 4: 13–16.
- Vrugtman, Freek (2010). "New lilac registered–'Colby's Twinkling Little Star'". Lilacs - Quarterly Journal. 39 (1): 12.
- Vrugtman, Freek (2010). International Lilac Register and Checklist (Report). Hamilton, Ontario, Canada: Royal Botanical Gardens.
- Vrugtman, Freek (2010). "Lilac cultivar name registration 2009". Hanburyana. 5: 5–7.
- Vrugtman, Freek (2013). "New lilac cultivar name registrations". Hanburyana. 7: 25–31.

The standard author abbreviation Vrugtman is used to indicate this person as the author when citing a botanical name.
