= Elsie Knott =

Canadian Mississauga leader and activist

- Elsie Knott
- Born: Elsie Marie Taylor; September 20, 1922; Curve Lake First Nation
- Died: December 3, 1995 (aged 73); Curve Lake First Nation
- Known for: First female Chief of a First Nation and for her work relating to preserving the Ojibwe language
- Spouse: Cecil Knott
- Children: 3

Elsie Marie Knott (née Taylor; September 20, 1922 – December 3, 1995) was a Canadian Mississauga leader and activist. Knott was the first woman in Canada to be elected as Chief of a First Nation. She became Chief of the Curve Lake First Nation in 1954, three years after the Indian Act was amended to give First Nations women the right to vote and hold positions in band governments. She was also known for her work relating to preserving the Ojibwe language and supporting children's education.

== Early life ==
Knott was born on 20 September 1922 in the Mud Lake Reserve (Curve Lake First Nation) in Ontario, Canada. Her parents were George Henry Taylor, a caretaker, and Esther Mae Taylor. She was raised only speaking Ojibwe until the age of nine.

As a child, Knott had an illness which meant that she started school late. After recovering from her illness, she began attending the local reserve school. The school was run by the Department of Indian Affairs and the use of the Ojibwe language was banned. The school taught up to grade eight and Knott reflected that "there was no mention of high school."

At the age of 15, Knott was married to Cecil Knott, who was 12 years her senior. They had three children by the time she was aged 20. As her husband suffered from tuberculosis (TB), Knott became responsible for the family finances, picking berries or sewing pyjamas for Indigenous children in federal hospitals.

== Career ==
In 1954, when she was aged 33, Knott became Chief of the Curve Lake First Nation, known at the time as the Mississaugas of Mud Lake, which is a Mississauga Ojibway First Nation near Peterborough, Ontario. She was elected in a landslide victory. She later said that "it never dawned on me that I was making history."

Elections of other female First Nation chiefs and councilors followed across Canada. By 1960, 21 women held elected band council positions, but elected First Nation female leadership was not widely embraced until the late 1990s–early 2000s. Knott herself went on to win eight consecutive elections and served as chief for sixteen years until 1976. She was a vocal opponent of the 1969 White Paper on Indian Policy, burning the paper then dancing on the ashes.

As Chief, Knott obtained federal funding to improve services on the reserve, which was used to build 45 houses, a daycare, community centre and senior citizens’ home. The funding was also used on infrastructure including digging wells and road improvements.

Knott arranged, through the Indian Affairs Department, the purchase of two conventional school buses, which she drove for 25 years so that children could attend high school. At the time of her death, Curve Lake First Nation Chief Keith Knott (not a direct relation) gave Knott's role in developing the reserve's school bus service as a prime example of her leadership and dedication to the community:

"She started off with a car of her own, driving a couple of students to school at Lakefield. But as more and more children wanted to go to high school, she bought a hearse and converted it to a school bus."

Knott was also known for her work relating to preserving the Ojibwe language, which included founding a language program at the Curve Lake First Nation School and teaching a weekly class. She also visited prisoners to teacher them the Ojibwe language while they were in jail. Knott's daughter Rita Rose became an elementary school teacher.

As an elder, Knott helped revive the community's powwow celebrations. She served as an elder in the Union of Ontario Indians.

Knott died on 3 December 1995 at her home on the Curve Lake First Nation, aged 73.

With Elsie, the difficult was easy, the impossible took a little longer.

— Father Paul Heffernan, Eulogy for Elsie Knott (as quoted in Voyageur 2008)

== Awards and legacy ==
- Outstanding Women Award (1992)
- Her memory was honoured as part of the Anishinabek Nation's Celebration of Women Conference (1998)
- Life Achievement award, awarded posthumously by the Union of Ontario Indians for community work and leadership (1999)

A play was written about Knott by Lois Franks titled Elsie, Indian Chief, Bus Driver, Shopkeeper, Grannie (1980).

In 2023, the Native Women’s Association of Canada included Knott on a prospective design for the Canadian $20 bill as part of their Change the Bill campaign.
