= Princess Point =

Coordinates: 43.27532°N 79.89666°W

Princess Point is located in the south east corner of Cootes Paradise marsh in Hamilton, Ontario, and is a principal access point to the surrounding natural areas. The property is part of the Cootes Paradise Nature Sanctuary owned and managed by the Royal Botanical Gardens (RBG). The low waterside peninsula next to Chedoke Creek has made Princess Point a natural gathering place for people for thousands of years. Archeological discoveries have indicated that between 1000 and 800 AD the Middle Woodland Culture brought agriculture in the form of corn production to the region. The discovery of this has given rise to the term the Princess Point Complex, referring to this archeological group of First Nations people that cover a large region of eastern North America.

The current parking area was created in the 1950s by the RBG through substantial infilling of the marshland due to site popularity as well as pending construction of adjacent Hwy 403, and for several decades the area was manicured parkland. The site provides both canoe access to Cootes Paradise and starting point for the waterfront and natural trails of the area. The point has since become a grasslands/Oak Savanah restoration project site of RBG initiated in 2007. The site has never been farmed, and was specifically capped by the RBG for protection from use in the 1960s. Unusual species of oak trees and savannah plants remain, complimented by the plant diversity of the sites restoration. To manage the plant community ongoing regular controlled burns occur. The site's archeological investigations were initiated by McMaster University in the 1960s and continued by University of Toronto in the late 1990s to 2011.

In 2018, the City of Hamilton announced it had discovered one of its sewer overflow tanks had inadvertently been left open for several years, leaking 24 billion liters of toxic sewage into Chedoke Creek, which empties into waters abutting Princess Point. Once identified, the city immediately stopped the discharge and began formulating plans for clean-up activities in the area, including hydraulic dredging of affected waters. On July 20, 2023, the City of Hamilton pled guilty in the Ontario Court of Justice to charges related to the spill and were ordered to pay a fine of $2.1 million (CAD), as well as an additional $364,500 to the Royal Botanical Gardens for damages incurred as a result of the discharges, and a $525,000 Victim Fine Surcharge, for a total of $2,985,500. Between July and December 2023 the City completed targeted dredging activities for contaminated sediments in the Lower Chedoke Creek near Princess Point. Approximately 10,000 cubic metres of contaminated sediments were removed and disposed of at a licensed site. In 2025, the City initiated two Municipal Class Environmental Assessments (MCEAs). These assessments are a continuation of the City’s actions related to the spill, as required by a Ministerial Order issued by the Ministry of the Environment, Conservation and Parks (MECP) under the Province of Ontario. The Lower Chedoke Creek Enhancement MCEA will address water quality improvements and habitat improvements within the Lower Chedoke Creek from King Street to Princess Point. The Chedoke Creek Watershed Stormwater Retrofits MCEA will address reducing urban pollutants entering the stormwater network and ultimately Cootes Paradise and Hamilton Harbour. A public information session was held on July 22, 2025. Further opportunities for public consultation are anticipated throughout 2026 and 2027.
