= Cootes Paradise =

Property of the Royal Botanical Gardens at the western end of Lake Ontario

Coordinates: 43.274°N 79.910°W

Cootes Paradise is a property with many boundaries, but it is primarily a property of the Royal Botanical Gardens at the western end of Lake Ontario and a remnant of the larger 3700-acre Dundas Marsh Crown Game Preserve established by the province of Ontario in 1927. Dominated by a 4.5-kilometre-long rivermouth wetland, representing the lake's western terminus, it is located on the west side of Hamilton Harbour in the municipality of Hamilton, Ontario, Canada. Cootes Paradise Environmentally Sensitive Area is a larger "core area" within the City of Hamilton's Natural Heritage System and has a very similar boundary to the original Dundas Crown Game Preserve.

The Cootes Paradise Nature Sanctuary area is a 600-hectare environmental protection and education area within the core natural heritage area, owned and managed by Royal Botanical Gardens (RBG), a charitable organization established in 1941 by the Government of Ontario. The wetland/marsh is also often referred to as Cootes Paradise but is part of the Cootes Paradise Nature Reserve and core area, with these lands representing 99% of the unaltered lands along the local Lake Ontario shoreline (~25 km). The site carries multiple designations, including National Historic Site and Nationally Important Bird Area (IBA), and is also central to inspiring the local principles for the World Biosphere program. Within the region's local Niagara Escarpment World Biosphere, it is unique as the only point of physical connection with Lake Ontario.

The marsh has also been referred to as the Dundas Marsh, a product of its surveyed location largely within the boundary of the former town of Dundas, and highlighted in conservation efforts initiated in the 1860s. Unusually, Royal Botanical Gardens is both the owner of the land under Cootes Paradise Marsh as well as regulator of activities on the water, despite its being an inlet of Lake Ontario. Water-area activity regulation was formerly under the Hamilton Harbour Commission (now Hamilton Oshawa Port Authority) as part of the area's historical federal port regulation. In the late 1970s, the Harbour Commission and Royal Botanical Gardens made an agreement transferring regulation of use of the water/ice area to the gardens in support of the environmental protection mandate. However, Royal Botanical Gardens has no regulatory oversight of the condition of the water flowing into the marsh.

== History ==
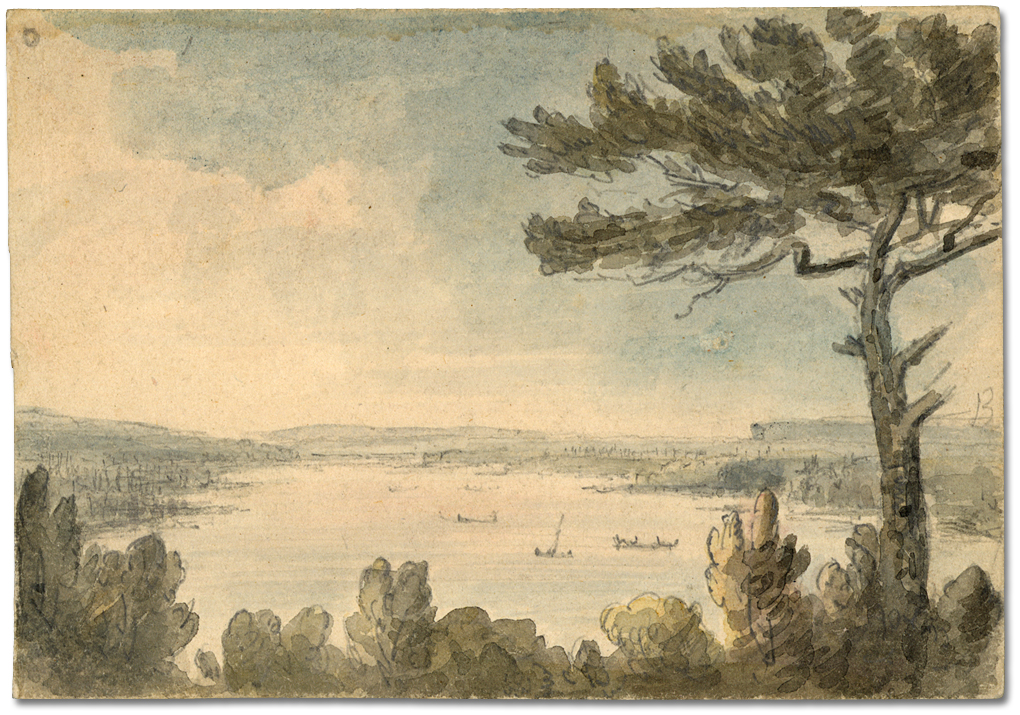
Cootes Paradise from the hill, painted on 11 June 1796 by Elizabeth Simcoe

The western end of Lake Ontario has been a traditional landing place, portage route, and gathering area since the glaciers retreated. The name Cootes Paradise results from its association with Thomas Coote, a British Army officer stationed in the Niagara area during the American Revolutionary War. He hunted and fished in the marsh during the 1780s, and as a result this was recorded in early maps as a means of reference. It also appears in the diary of Elizabeth Simcoe, wife of John Graves Simcoe, the first Lieutenant Governor of Upper Canada in 1796. Indigenous peoples' names for the marsh has not been ascertained, a result of the multiple groups who have used the area over the past centuries. The 1784 version of the Between the Lakes Purchase from the Mississauga references the outflow channel as part of the definition of the treaties boundaries - Washquarter.

The wetland contains diverse habitats, but is largely a seasonally flooded river mouth marsh feed by multiple creeks, dominated by Spencer Creek. It is a surrounded by steep oak forested hills with multiple low areas, associated with the main river deltas providing landings and access to the water. It has provided food for people and habitat to a wide variety of lifeforms that span international borders.

The habitat went into decline beginning in the late 19th century as a result of water pollution, human overuse, canal dredging, highway building, and the introduction of carp into Lake Ontario. The first petition for habitat projection for the marsh portion was in 1866. Habitat protection for the broader landscape is tied to the Hamilton Bird Protection society, and a developer that settled with the city of Hamilton for owed taxes for a large block on the south side of Cootes Paradise. This formed the foundation of public property, that was set aside as part of a much larger large Crown Game Preserve in 1927 (~2900 acres). The remnants of the 1927 crown game preserve were placed under the control of the Royal Botanical Gardens for management with its formation in 1941, with the Gardens reacquiring many of the original crown game preserve lands over the decades.

By 1985, 85% of the wetland plant cover was lost, 90% of the remainder was non-native species retained in the swamp habitat areas, and the carp population numbered over 70,000 fish. As part of ongoing efforts to reverse this ecological decline, RBG introduced Project Paradise in 1993, part of the Hamilton Harbour Remedial Action Plan, with this ending in 2015. Projects to restore the marsh date back to the late 1940s. The continuing restoration efforts must focus on removing sources of stress to the marsh for inflowing water pollution, minimizing the number of spawning carp, and re-establishing native plants through reintroduction projects. A number of identified anthropogenic stresses continue to create the unbalanced populations of carp and Canada geese. These are water quality and quantity based. Poor water clarity is a result of extremely high nutrient and sediment levels derived from sewage and urban runoff. Rapid sediment accumulation is the result of unmanaged land use patterns in the watersheds, while the regulated water level in Lake Ontario has dramatically altered the flooding pattern.

Controlled burns have been conducted in an effort to restore some of the old field areas to their original oak savanna ecosystem, a rare grouping of Carolinian plants and animals.

Cootes Paradise Marsh is connected to Hamilton Harbour via a modified outflow channel dominated by the waters of Spencer Creek. The Desjardins Canal, modified the natural channels, dug through the wetland between 1826 and 1837 to connect Dundas, Ontario, with shipping on the Great Lakes. The canal was later straightened by an excavation through the Burlington Heights in 1851 to accommodate the railway across the eastern end of the marsh, with the natural outflow sealed off by a berm supporting the railway.

In 2000, the City of Hamilton constructed a 3 km recreational trail connecting Royal Botanical Gardens to Pier 4 Park; creating a Waterfront Trail system. Royal Botanical Gardens' trails are open to passive recreation only as the area is a National Historic site, Nationally Important Bird Area (IBA), Important Amphibian and Reptile Area (IMPARA), containing numerous endangered species. As such, activities such as biking, jogging and orienteering are against the by-laws other than on the Desjardins Trail. The Desjardin Trail opened in 2001 and is a repurposing of the Gardens' service road to the Cootes Paradise Fishway.

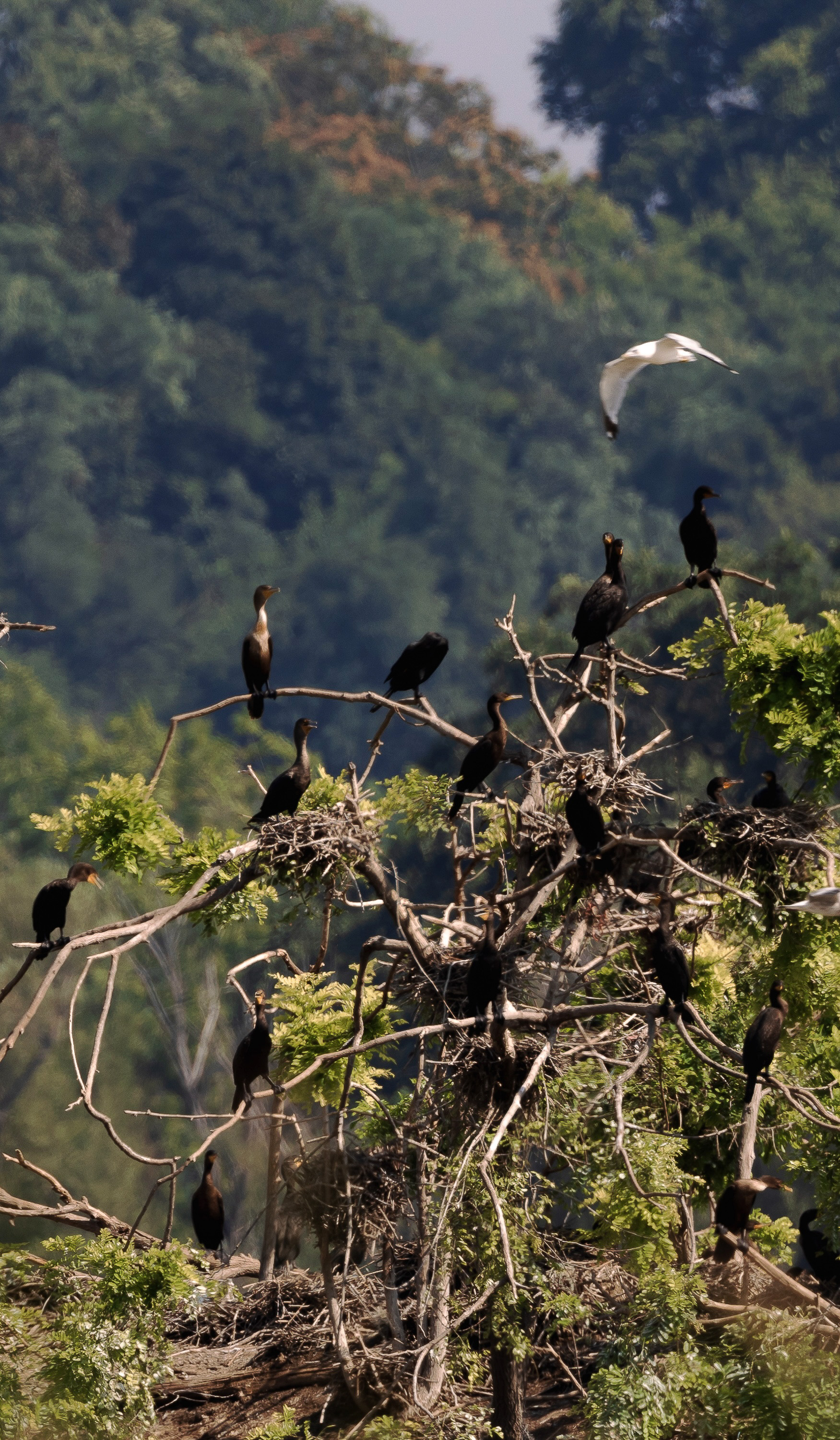
Cormorants at Cootes Paradise

== Flora and fauna ==
=== Birds ===
Cootes Paradise is designated a nationally Important Bird Area (IBA) due to its strategic location at the tip of Lake Ontario and with the Central and Mississippi Flyways. As a result, hundreds of species of birds use Cootes Paradise at some point during the year, most notably during the spring and autumn migratory periods. Notable species include the least bittern, hooded warbler, white pelican, Caspian tern, black-crowned night-heron, osprey, pileated woodpecker, and the prothonotary warbler. In 2013 a nesting pair of bald eagles recolonized the marsh on the north shore of Cootes Paradise. This was the first such nest on Lake Ontario in more than 40 years.

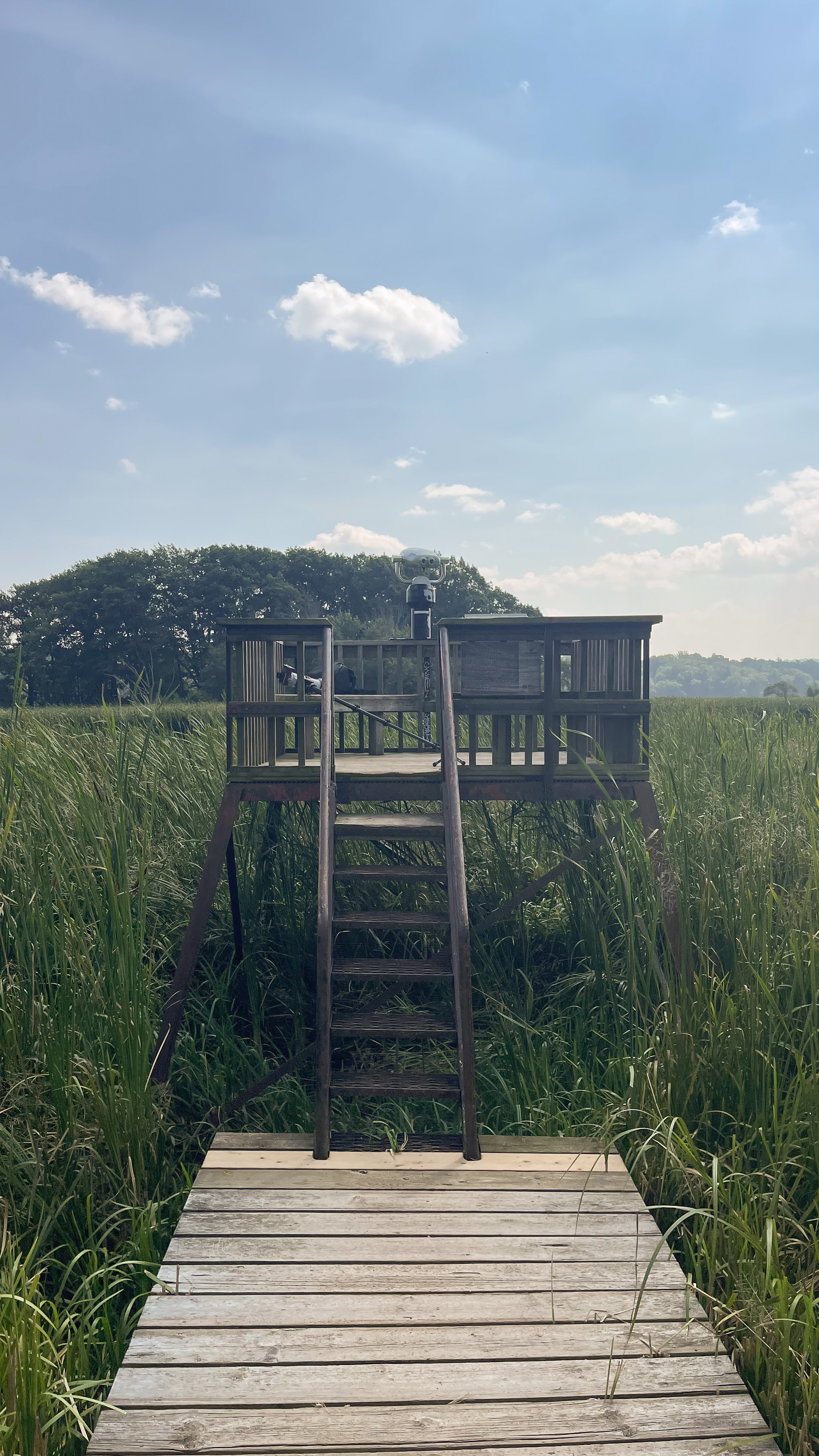
Lookout tower on the marsh boardwalk

=== Fish ===
The wetlands function as a seasonal fish nursery for Lake Ontario, and despite the historical degradation, most historical species of fish can still be found using the marsh. As with birds and plants, the location is a biodiversity hotspot for Canada, with over 60 species present. Each spring thousands of spawning fish migrate in through the Fishway from the bay and lake, laying eggs and leaving shortly after, allowing the marsh to function as a giant fish hatchery. Annually between 5 and 20 million fish are produced for the lake depending on water levels and water pollution events. The species present reflect the degraded marsh habitat, with the most common the gizzard shad (formerly carp). Also common are nighttime predator species channel catfish and brown bullhead, along with invasive species such as alewife and white perch. Popular angling species present in limited numbers include pike, largemouth bass, and yellow perch, but the large adults are only present in the marsh during the spawning season, when it is closed to fishing. Spring and fall also bring several migrating salmon and trout to the marsh's main inflowing river. The earliest conservation efforts for Cootes Paradise originate in the 1860s, with the first petition for protection in 1866 by John W. Kerr, Canada's first fisheries overseer.

In 2007 and 2012, when there was low water level in Lake Ontario and a favorable wind, all the water was pushed out of Cootes Paradise and the remaining carp swam out into Hamilton Harbour. RBG staff removed the fish gates, herded out the last of the carp, and then replaced the gates. Since then the wetland has been relatively carp-free. In the absence of these large destructive bottom feeders there is a gradual return of natural native plant species populations. Record high water levels in 2017 and 2019 allowed many carp back in again.

A February 2021 report by Maclean's, with the headline "The goldfish invasion of Hamilton Harbour", discussed the numerous goldfish in the area, presumed to have come from the dumping of pet fish by the public. One expert stated that the goldfish "is the ultimate survivor of difficult conditions ... it can feed on blue-green algae blooms that native species cannot—blooms that appear with increasing frequency in Hamilton Harbour".

=== Reptiles ===
Declining populations of turtles inhabit Cootes Paradise, including painted turtles, common snapping turtles, and northern map turtles. A barrier to prevent carp presence in the marsh was established in 1997, and reduced habitat damage, allowing flora and fauna to start to recolonize and reestablish a foodweb. The turtle populations have declined substantially due to lack of recruitment of young due to the badly damaged habitat, as well as significant road kill. Extensive wildlife barriers were established along some sections of adjacent roads starting in 2015. Several species of snakes are also found in the area, including northern water snakes.

=== Mammals ===
Over 30 mammal species inhabit Cootes Paradise, including the white-tailed deer, red fox, raccoon, beaver, cottontail rabbit, muskrat, mink, opossum, red squirrel, coyote, southern flying squirrel, northern flying squirrel, star-nosed mole, and peculiar species such as the water vole.

=== Plants ===
Cootes Paradise is home to the highest concentration of plant species in Canada, with over 750 native species; however, an additional 300 have also been introduced following European settlement of the area, putting strain on the local ecosystem's ability to function.

Among the trees found in Cootes Paradise are various species of oak, maple, and pine, as well as less common species such as sassafras tree, and tulip tree. Examples can be found along the native trees walk across from the nature centre. In recent years there has been a noticeable decline in forest health and loss of trees due to ongoing anthropogenic stresses in the region, including surrounding Cootes Paradise.

In 2005, following the death of a child participating on a nature hike during a wind storm, the RBG was forced to cut down numerous dead and dying trees that posed a public-safety concern, and alter the trail system to ensure some of the sensitive habitat could remain undisturbed by these activities.

A recent analysis of the checklist of all plants growing within the various nature sanctuaries of RBG reveals that these properties are among the richest spots in Canada for plant diversity, with 24% of the flora of Canada and 38% of the flora of Ontario present. Among this diversity are multiple nationally and provincially endangered species.

West of Bull's Point is an island called Hickory Island. The island was dominated by hickory trees, but these were killed by nesting double-crested cormorants, due to their feces altering soil chemistry. Islands where colonial nesting birds can successfully nest are rare features within the Great Lakes. Multiple artificial islands have been constructed in adjacent Burlington Bay to facilitate this activity as part of the Hamilton Harbour Remedial Action Plan.

Southern wild rice, Zizania aquatica, an annual plant (re-growing from seed each year) and traditional food plant has been successfully reintroduced by the Royal Botanical Gardens, but continues to be rare and is easily damaged by water pollution events.

== See also ==
- Princess Point, principal access point to surrounding natural areas
