= Princess Point complex =

North American archaeological culture

- Alternative names: Princess Point culture
- Period: Middle Woodland to Late Woodland
- Dates: c. 500 CE – 1000 CE
- Type site: Princess Point site
- Followed by: Glen Meyer culture
- Defined by: David Marvyn Stothers

The Princess Point complex (also called the Princess Point culture) is an archaeological culture of the Middle to Late Woodland period of northeastern North America.

The complex marked a transition between the latter part of the Middle Woodland period and the early Late Woodland period. One date estimate places the time period of the Princess Point complex as lasting from around 500 CE to around 1000 CE. It later developed into the Glen Meyer culture.

Named for its type site at Princess Point near modern-day Hamilton, Ontario, Canada, the complex was present in the area between the Grand River and the Niagara Peninsula.

It is characterized by a horticultural economy, including the cultivation of maize, as well as aspects of sedentism. It was originally conceptualized by the archaeologist David Marvyn Stothers.

== Characteristics and social changes ==
The Princess Point marked a transition to early maize-based agriculture and an increasingly sedentary way of life. Stothers describes Princess Point maize cultivation as "developmental-experimental", and notes the appearance of palisaded agricultural villages containing proto-longhouses. Maize cultivation as a supplement to foraged foods began at least as early as 500 CE. James V. Wright linked the Princess Point culture with the introduction of maize agriculture into Ontario.

There was a general westward geographic shift in focus during this period, with the appearance of sites such as the Glass site (AgHb-5) on the western bank of the Grand River. By the end phase of this Grand River focus, however, occupation had shifted away from river-adjacent floodplains to well-drained sandy hills and plains in modern-day Norfolk County, which were more suitable for maize agriculture.

=== Early maize cultivation in Ontario ===
The Princess Point culture is linked to the introduction of maize to Ontario. This was initially believed in the 1970s to have occurred around AD 650. Later accelerator mass spectrometry (AMS) testing done in the mid-1990s on samples from the Grand Banks site (AfGx-3) returned a calibrated radiocarbon date of AD 540.

== Archaeological framework ==
David Marvyn Stothers developed the Princess Point complex as an archaeological framework in the late 1960s and early 1970s. His definition of it as a complex was rooted in an understanding of "Princess Point" as being widely distributed; therefore, it was divided into three regional foci (the Point Pelee, Ausable, and Grand River) and three phases falling within an original date range of AD 600 to AD 900.

William Fox later revised this framework, proposing instead that the Princess Point complex should be more narrowly defined around the Grand River focus, with the Ausable focus being excluded as too poorly documented, and the Point Pelee focus assigned to the Riviere au Vase phase of the Western Basin tradition. The timescale was also narrowed to AD 650–900.

== Foci and sites ==
Stothers divided the Princess Point complex into a set of three regional foci composed of clusters of similar sites. In a 1973 list, these were:

Grand River focus

- Surma site
- Orchid site
- Martin site
- Jordan Harbour site
- Reimer site
- Selkirk #5
- Selkirk #2
- Port Maitland site
- Newman site (AfGv-3)
- Cayuga Bridge site (AfGx-1)
- Grand Banks site (AfGx-3)
- Indiana site
- Middleport site (Princess Point component)
- Glass site (AgHb-5)
- Porteous site (AgHb-1) – transitional Princess Point–Glen Meyer site
- Mohawk Chapel
- Princess Point
- Rat Island

Point Pelee focus

- Indian Clearing (AbHl-4)
- Kreiger site
- Van Hooste site
- Cummings site

Ausable focus

- Smith site (AhHk-1)
- Fox site (AhHk-29)
- Bear site (AhHk-31)
- Pinery site (AhHl-12)

As well, the Forster site is a notable Princess Point site which also contained a Glen Meyer component.

== See also ==
- Point Peninsula complex
- History of agriculture in Canada
