= Royal Botanical Gardens (Ontario) =

Botanical garden in Ontario, Canada

- Interactive map of Royal Botanical Gardens
- Type: Botanical garden
- Location: Burlington, Ontario, Canada (Headquarters); Hamilton, Ontario, Canada (Gardens)
- Coordinates: 43°17′28″N 79°52′33″W
- Area: 1,100 hectares (2,700 acres)
- Created: 1929
- Founder: Thomas McQuesten
- Visitors: 387,104 (in 2023)
- Status: Open all year
- Website: www.rbg.ca

National Historic Site of Canada
- Official name: Royal Botanical Gardens National Historic Site of Canada
- Designated: January 1, 1994

The Royal Botanical Gardens (RBG) is a historic site-listed botanical garden located in the cities of Burlington and Hamilton in Ontario, Canada. It covers extensive environmentally protected areas, historic sites, and culturally relevant gardens from Burlington to Hamilton. It is one of the major tourist attractions between Niagara Falls and Toronto, as well as being a significant local and regional horticultural, education, conservation, and scientific resource.

The Royal Botanical Gardens' mandate derives from The Royal Botanical Gardens Act, 1941 of the Legislature of Ontario, centred on human interaction with the natural world and protection of environmentally significant lands that form the western tip of Lake Ontario. The gardens cover an area of approximately 10 km by 4 km that is dominated by two coastal wetlands, and landscapes that were carved during the last glaciation, extending from Lake Ontario inland to the plateau of the Niagara Escarpment. The many different gardens and natural areas are accessed through nine public entrance locations.

In 2006, in support of the United Nations Convention on Biological Diversity, Royal Botanical Gardens was selected as Canada's National Focal Point for the Global Strategy for Plant Conservation (GSPC) by Environment and Climate Change Canada.

The 980 hectares (2,422 acres) of nature sanctuary owned by the Royal Botanical Gardens is largely a remnant of the Dundas Marsh Game Preserve created in 1927. The properties now carry many cultural and environmental designations. Multiple national historic site features are associated with area, with the site featuring prominently as a landing and connection point to other regions of the Great Lakes. It is considered an important plant biodiversity hotspot for Canada, with a very high proportion of the wild plants of Canada in one area; is an Important Bird Area according to Bird Studies Canada; and is part of the Niagara Escarpment World Biosphere Reserve. More than 1,100 species of plants grow within its boundaries including the Bashful Bulrush (Trichophorum planifolium) which is found nowhere else in Canada, and the largest remaining population of one of Canada's most endangered trees, the Red Mulberry (Morus rubra). Both of these plants are listed as Endangered in Canada under the Species at Risk Act. In 2008, the RBG was designated as an Important Amphibian and Reptile Area by CARCNET, the Canadian Amphibian and Reptile Conservation Network. Several plants listed on various Endangered Species Protection programs are held for protection and education purposes in various garden areas.

Unusually, Royal Botanical Gardens is both the owner of the land under the provincially significant Class 1 Wetland, Cootes Paradise, and Grindstone Marsh as well as regulator of activities on the water, despite it being an inlet of Lake Ontario. Water area activity regulation was formerly under the Hamilton Harbour Commission (Now Hamilton Oshawa Port Authority) as part of the area's historical federal port regulation. In the late 1970s, the Harbour Commission and Royal Botanical Gardens made an agreement transferring regulation of use of the water area to the Gardens in support of its environmental protection mandate. However, Royal Botanical Gardens has no regulatory control over the quality of water flowing into its wetlands.

== History ==
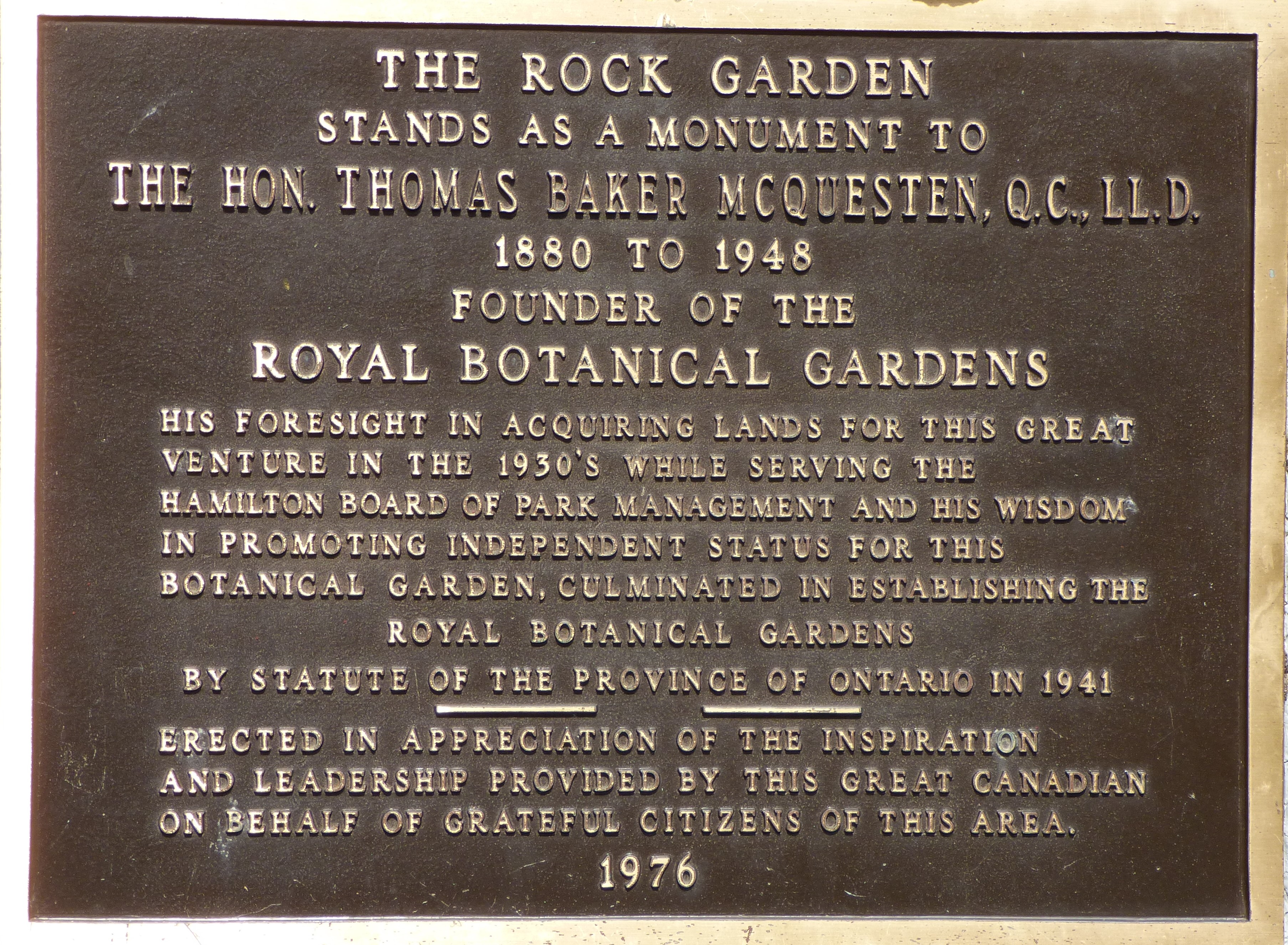
Plaque with history on T. B. McQuesten, the founder of Royal Botanical Gardens.

Royal Botanical Gardens developed as a concept in the 1920s under the City of Hamilton Board of Park Management, led by Thomas McQuesten. Initially the proposed botanical garden was to be located along the south shore of Cootes Paradise Marsh surrounding the Hamilton campus of McMaster University. The proposed botanical garden would also protect extensive natural areas along the marsh.

Formal permission was obtained in 1930 from King George V to call the gardens the "Royal Botanical Gardens". At the same time as the proposal for the botanical gardens was under consideration, the City of Hamilton was undertaking an ambitious program of beautification on the nearby Burlington Heights. The North-Western Entrance to Hamilton project included an extensive set of gardens designed by the Toronto firm of Wilson, Bunnell and Borgstrom. Among these was the Rock Garden created by lining a 5.5 acres (2.2 ha) abandoned gravel pit with limestone from the Niagara Escarpment. In 1932, the Board of Park Management brought together the Burlington Heights gardens and the south shore of Cootes Paradise as Royal Botanical Gardens.

The original vision of RBG was a mixture of horticultural displays and protected natural forests and wetlands. The first Director of RBG, Dr. Norman Radforth, was appointed in 1947 and was a Professor of Botany at nearby McMaster University. In 1954, Leslie Laking, initially Assistant Director and Horticulturist, was appointed as Director and served until 1981. Under his guidance, the institution developed into the major entity it is today. In the 1960s, growth in horticultural expertise enriched the gardens and its programs, including new staff such as taxonomist Dr. James Pringle and Curator Freek Vrugtman. Over the years additional protected lands were added to RBG, including most recently the Berry Tract South property in 2015.

With approximately 1,100 ha (2,700 acres) of property, Royal Botanical Gardens is one of the largest such institutions in North America. In 2006, the Auxiliary of RBG published Love, sweat and soil: a history of Royal Botanical Gardens from 1930 to 1981 authored by Dr. Laking.

== Financial ==
Funding for the institution was initially provided largely by the City of Hamilton and then in the 1940s by the Government of Ontario. By the early 1980s, funding restrictions and the desire to become increasingly self-supported led to charging of an admission fee for the cultivated garden areas. Admission is free to members. The extensive system of nature trails, more than 20 kilometres (12 mi) in length, has remained accessible to the local community within walking distance or by taking public transit. Membership revenues are critical to facilitating access. As of 2024, approximately 27% of the RBG's annual budget comes from support from the Province of Ontario, the City of Hamilton and the Region of Halton. The remainder, 73%, is classed as 'self-generated revenue' and is raised annually from admissions, memberships, donations, summer camps, and fees-for-service.

An organized volunteer group of more than 500 members supports the efforts to fulfill the RBG mandate. Annually, volunteers help raises tens of thousands of dollars and donate tens of thousands of hours in such roles as tour guides, events support, staffing the Archives, and maintaining plant collections.

== Attractions ==
Royal Botanical Gardens presents five garden areas to visitors: Hendrie Park, RBG Centre (which includes the Mediterranean Garden, RBG's only conservatory), The Arboretum, Laking Garden, and the David Braley and Nancy Gordon Rock Garden. Major natural areas include trails through the valley of the lower Grindstone Creek, Rock Chapel, north and south shores of Cootes Paradise, and Princess Point.

The Rock Garden is the oldest garden on the site, debuting in 1932 with the park's opening. It contains 1,600 plant species, including a collection of conifers, as well as sculptures, a waterfall, and other water features.

Hendrie Park is the largest garden on the site. It includes the Rose Garden, which was originally planted in 1965. In 2017, it was replanted with a greater diversity of roses including Canadian and historical varieties. It also includes companion plants and was rebuilt with a trickle irrigation system.

The Helen M. Kippax Garden is a butterfly garden with species of milkweed and other nectar plants specifically to attract the Monarch butterfly and establish a Monarch waystation for the butterfly's migration. The plant species in the garden are native to Ontario.

Long standing RBG trails on the Niagara Escarpment at Rock Chapel are part of the original founding of the Bruce Trail. In 2010, RBG partnered with Geotrail to bring its trail network to the internet through an interactive website.

The natural lands or nature sanctuaries of Royal Botanical Gardens include some of the most significant wildlife and native plant areas in Canada. The largest area, which includes the wetland called Cootes Paradise or Dundas Marsh, is a major spawning area for native fish species in Lake Ontario, one of the best bird-watching areas in Canada, and is the subject of one of Canada's largest ecological rehabilitation efforts aimed at a wetland, called 'Project Paradise.'

The Arboretum contains one of the world's most diverse lilac collections, the Katie Osborne Lilac Collection. The "Lilac Dell" contains 570 plants of 407 unique varieties and is one of RBG's biggest attractions in late May. The arboretum also features collections of crabapples, dogwoods, magnolias, and redbuds. Royal Botanical Gardens also holds the second-largest garden show in Canada called The Ontario Garden Show. It comes second only to Canada Blooms which is held in Toronto.

The RBG Centre is an indoor garden that is open year-round featuring over 1200 varieties of plants.

Innovative educational programs are operated from both RBG's main building in Burlington and the Nature Interpretive Centre, located in the Arboretum to the north of Cootes Paradise in Hamilton. More than 18,000 school children per year visit the organized school programs, and over 200 public education offerings include such diverse topics as botanical illustration, organic cooking and basic botany. Aldershot School offers an ECO Studies program in conjunction with the RBG.

Royal Botanical Gardens is a member of the American Public Gardens Association and Botanic Gardens Conservation International and is active in local, regional, national, and international efforts to conserve plant diversity and ensure its sustainable use.

Royal Botanical Gardens' properties span Bayview Junction, hosting several popular locations for railfanning.

== Gallery ==
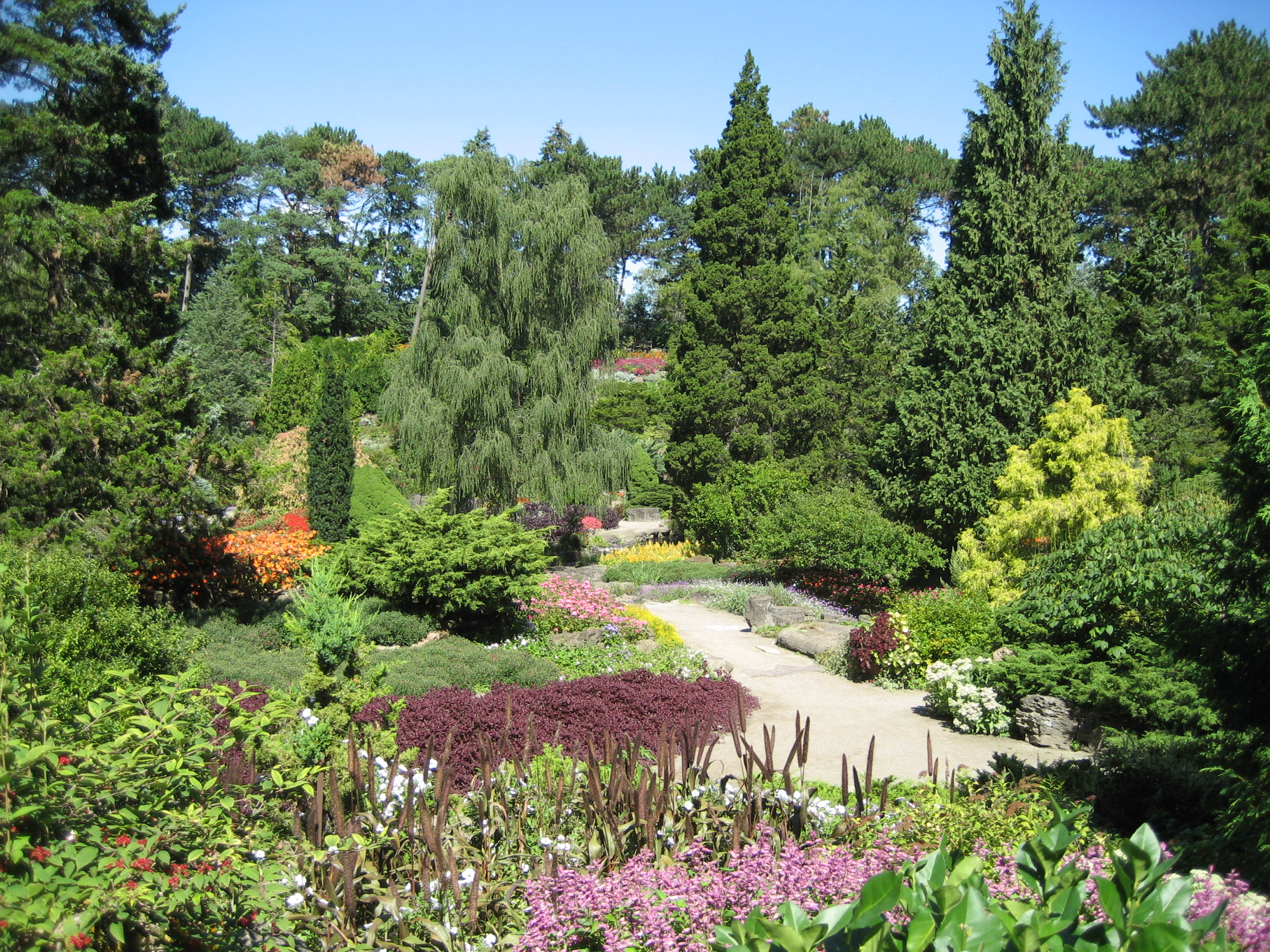
Rock Gardens

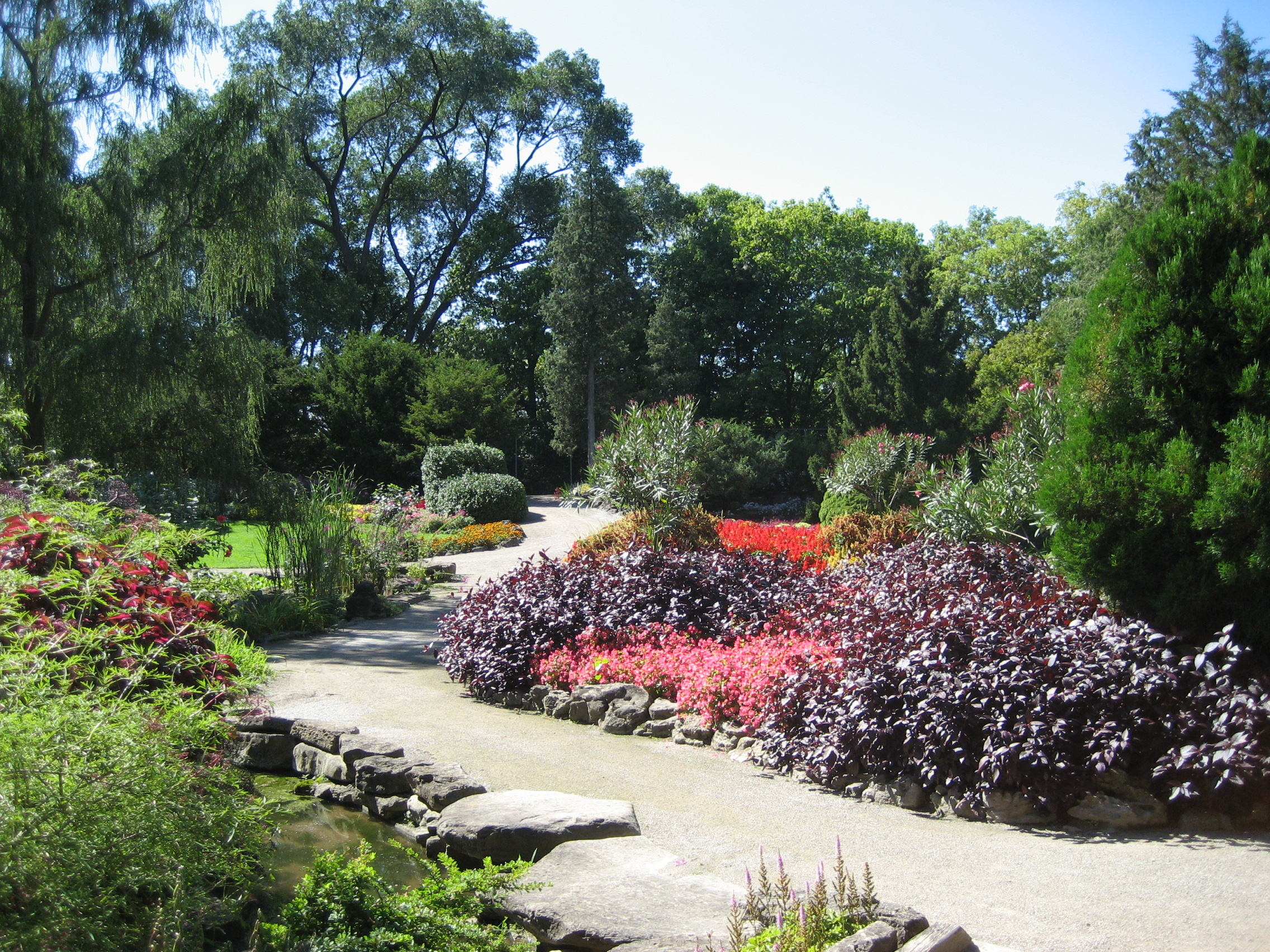
Rock Gardens

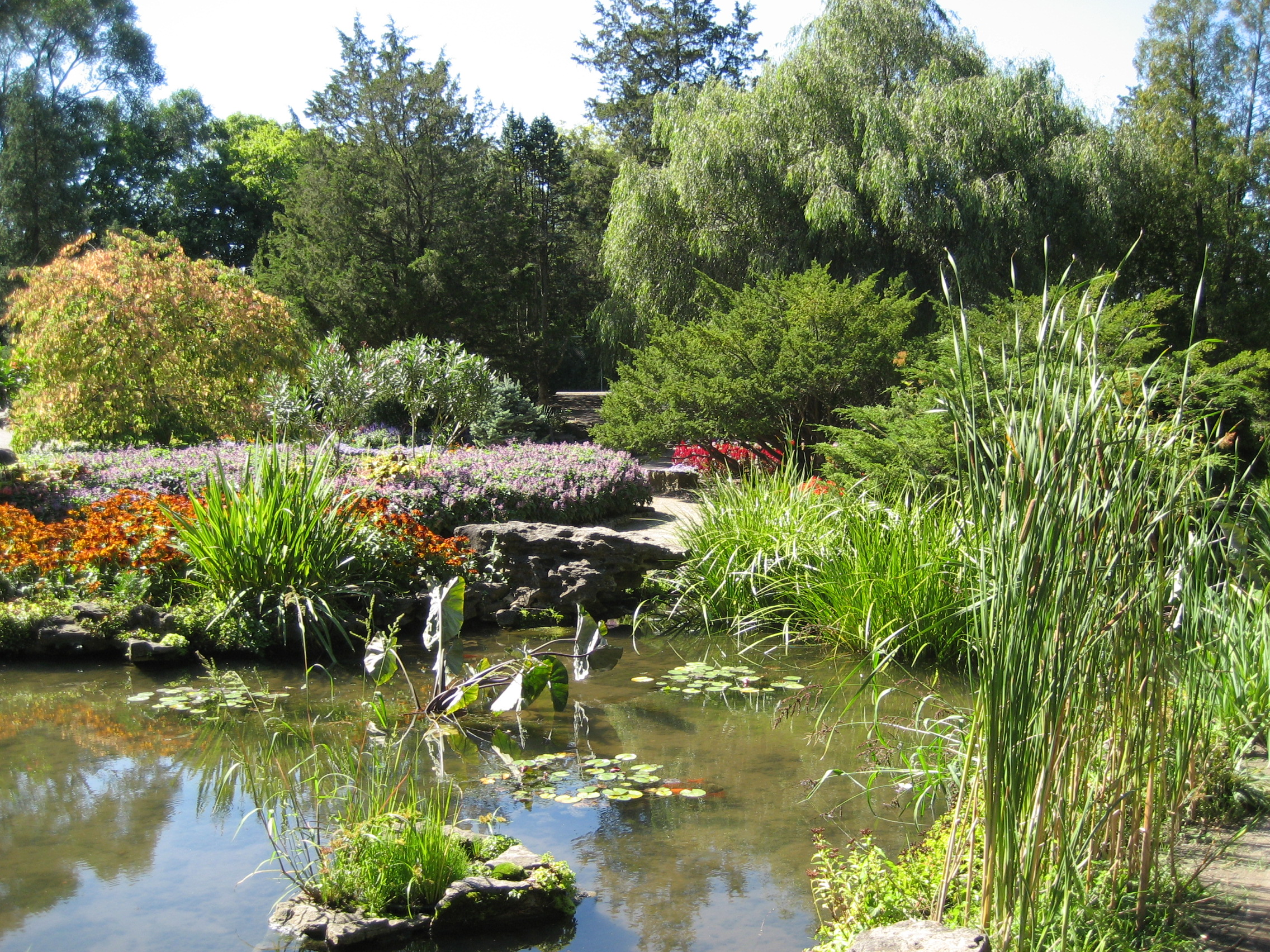
Rock Gardens

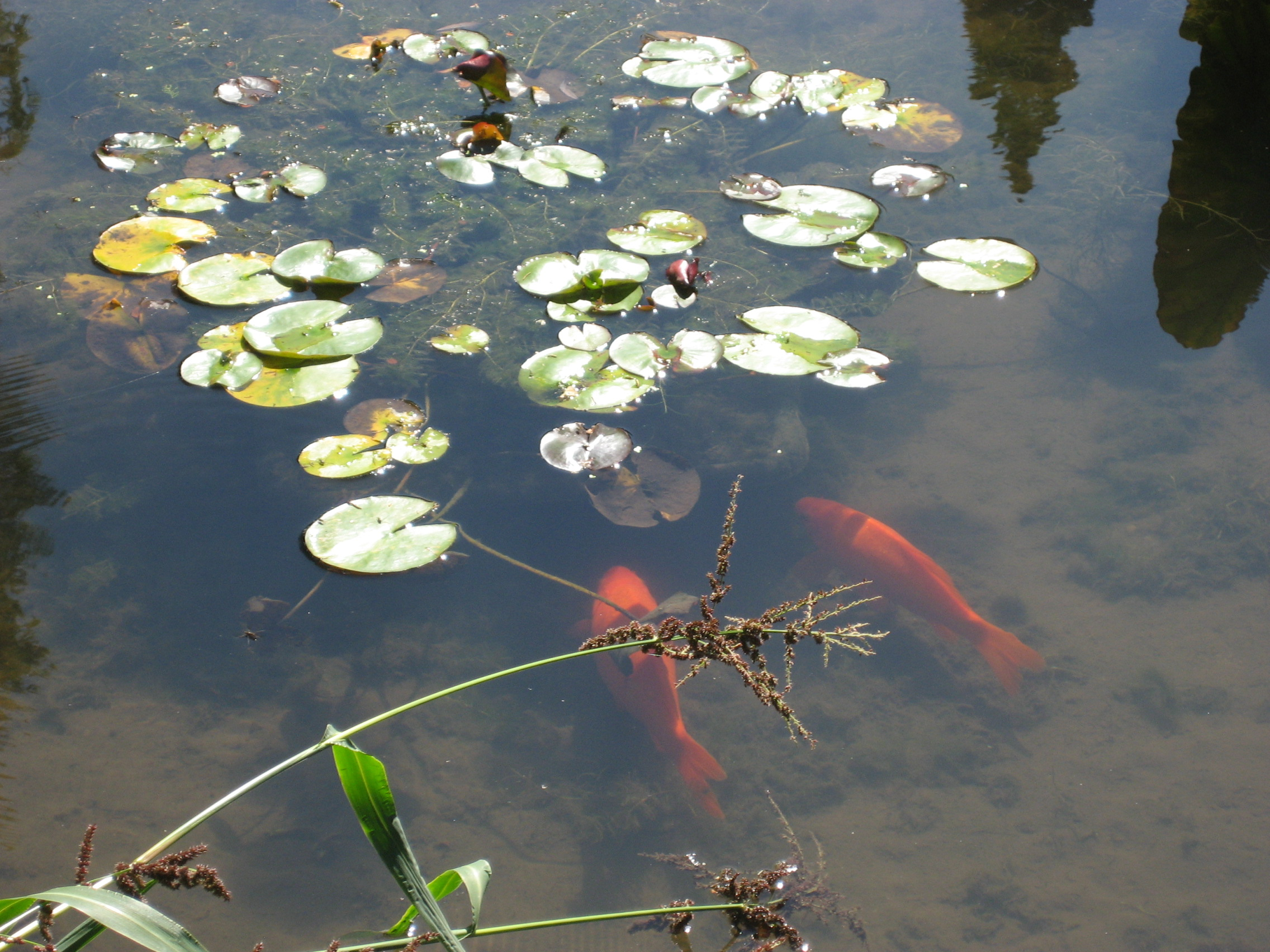
Rock Gardens

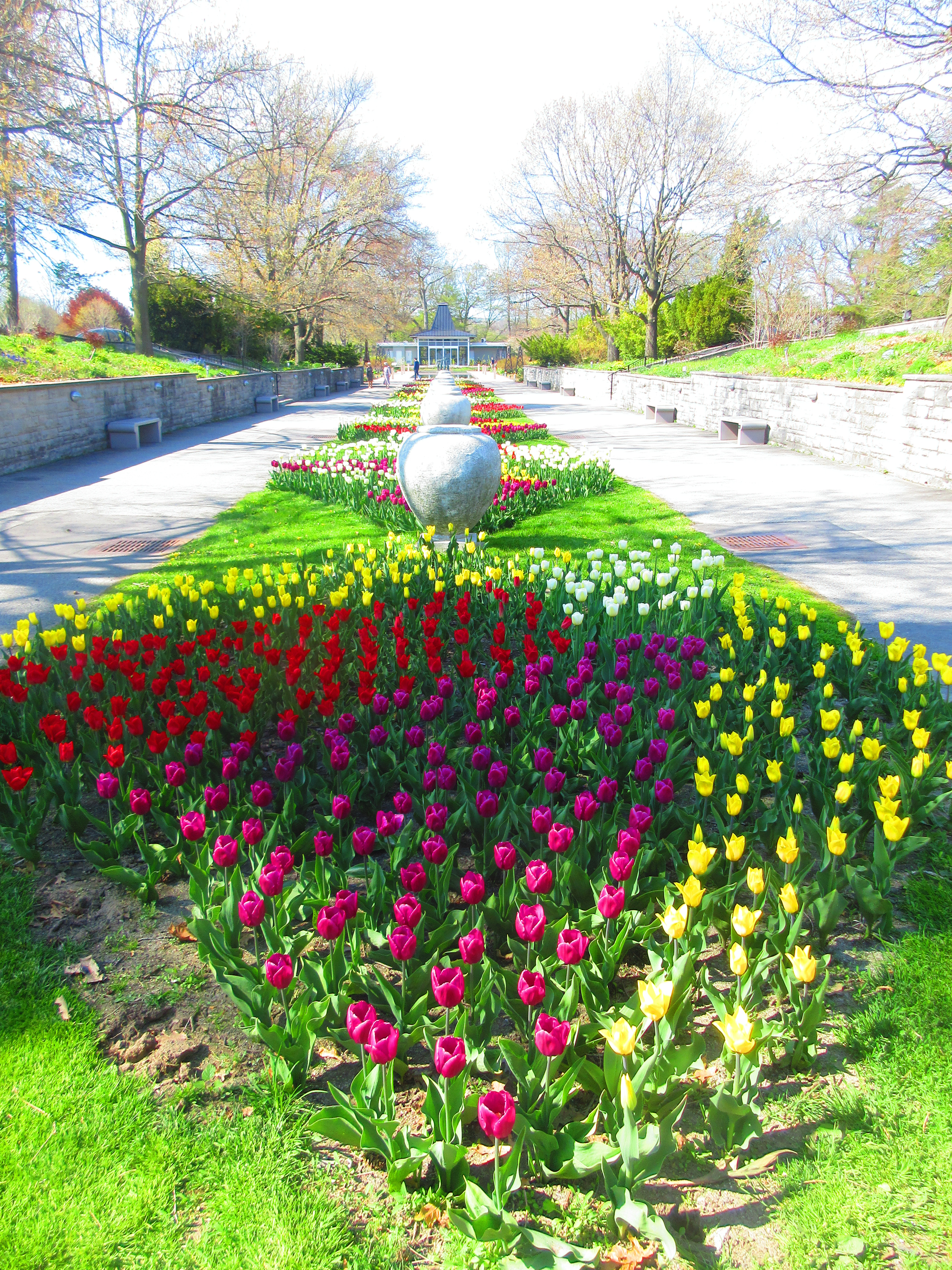
Hendrie Park

Hendrie Park

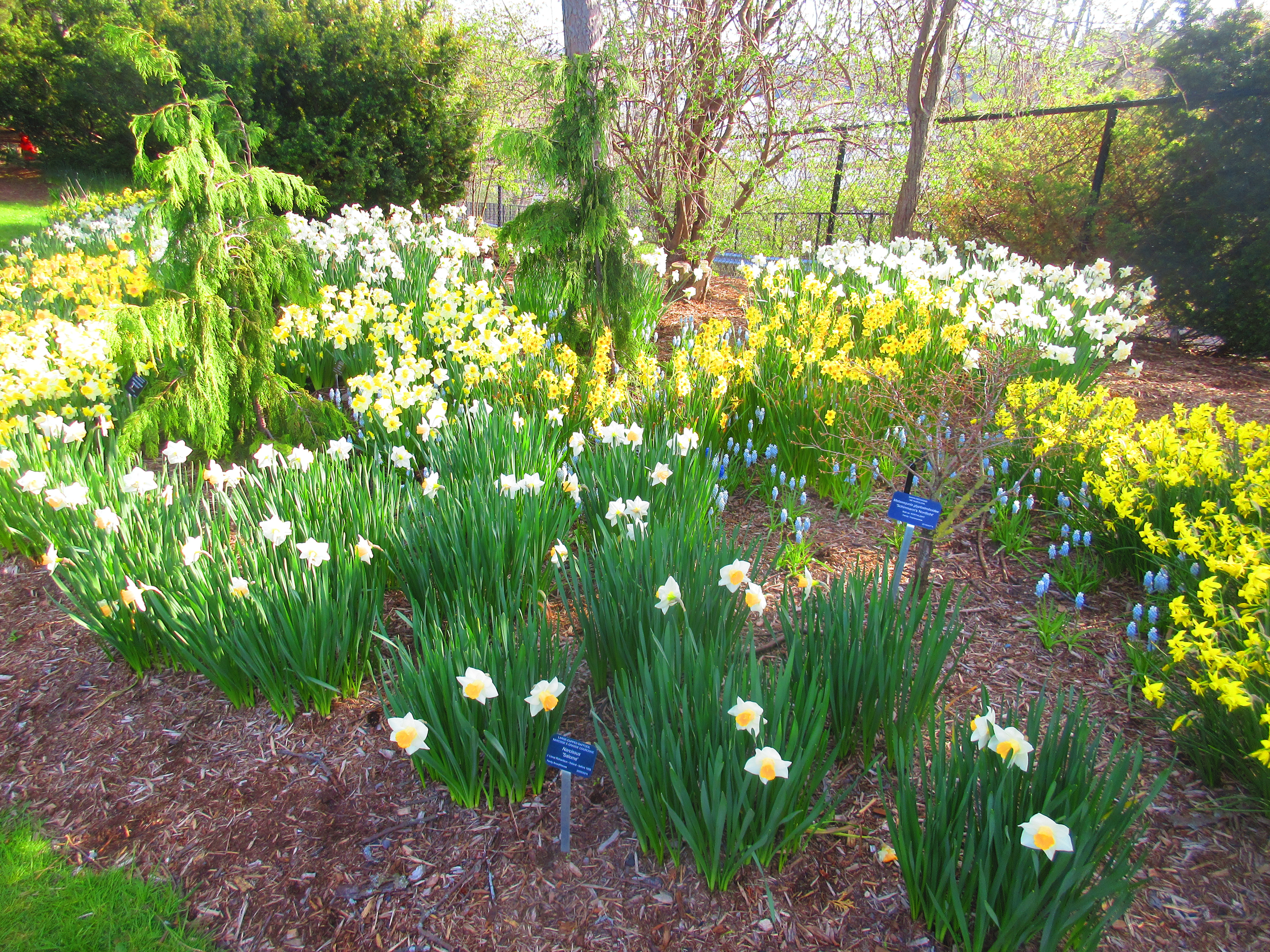
Laking Garden

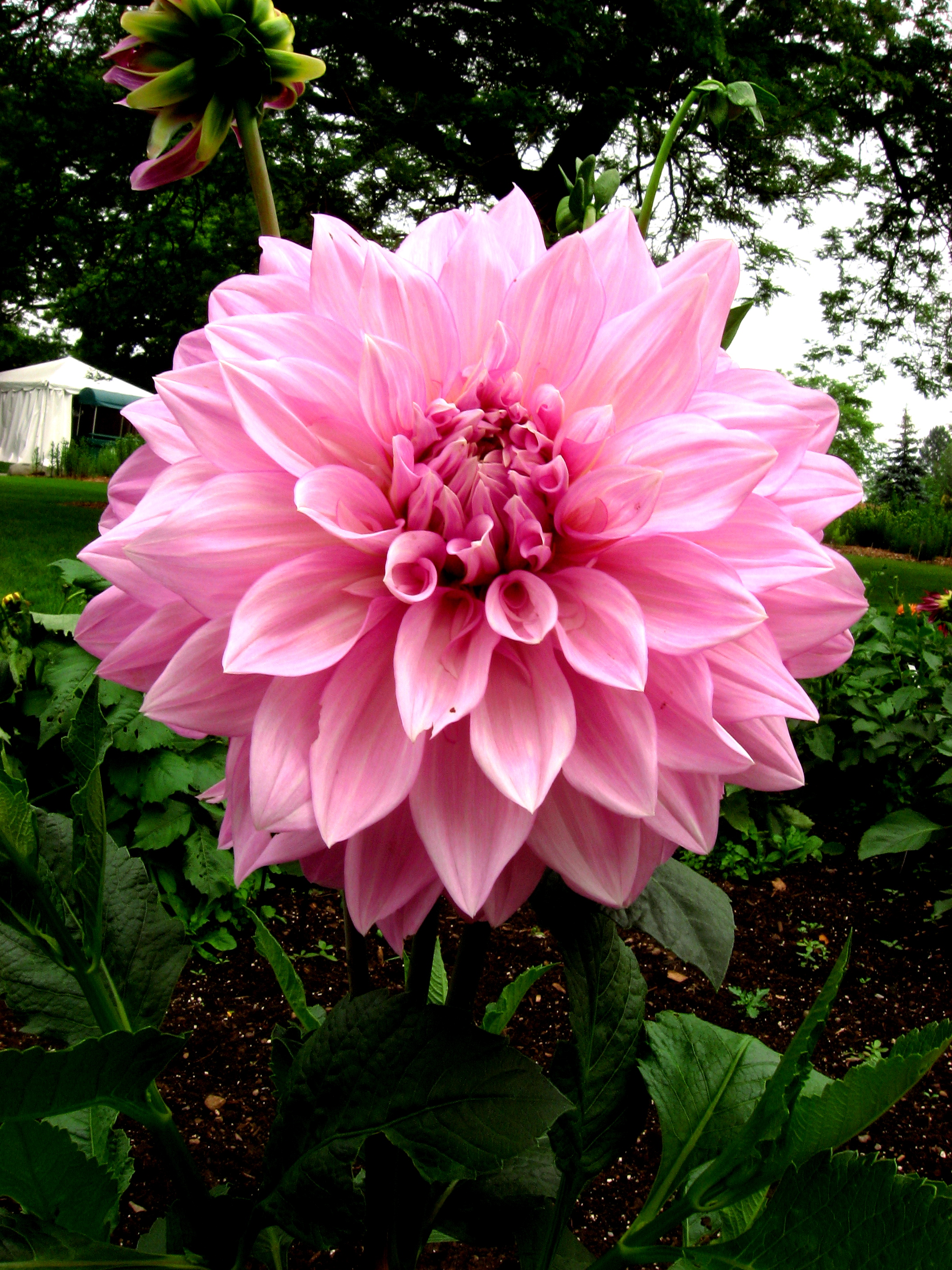
Dahlia, 2008 Rose Celebration, RBG

Rose Celebration, RBG

Blooms at the Lilac Celebration, RBG

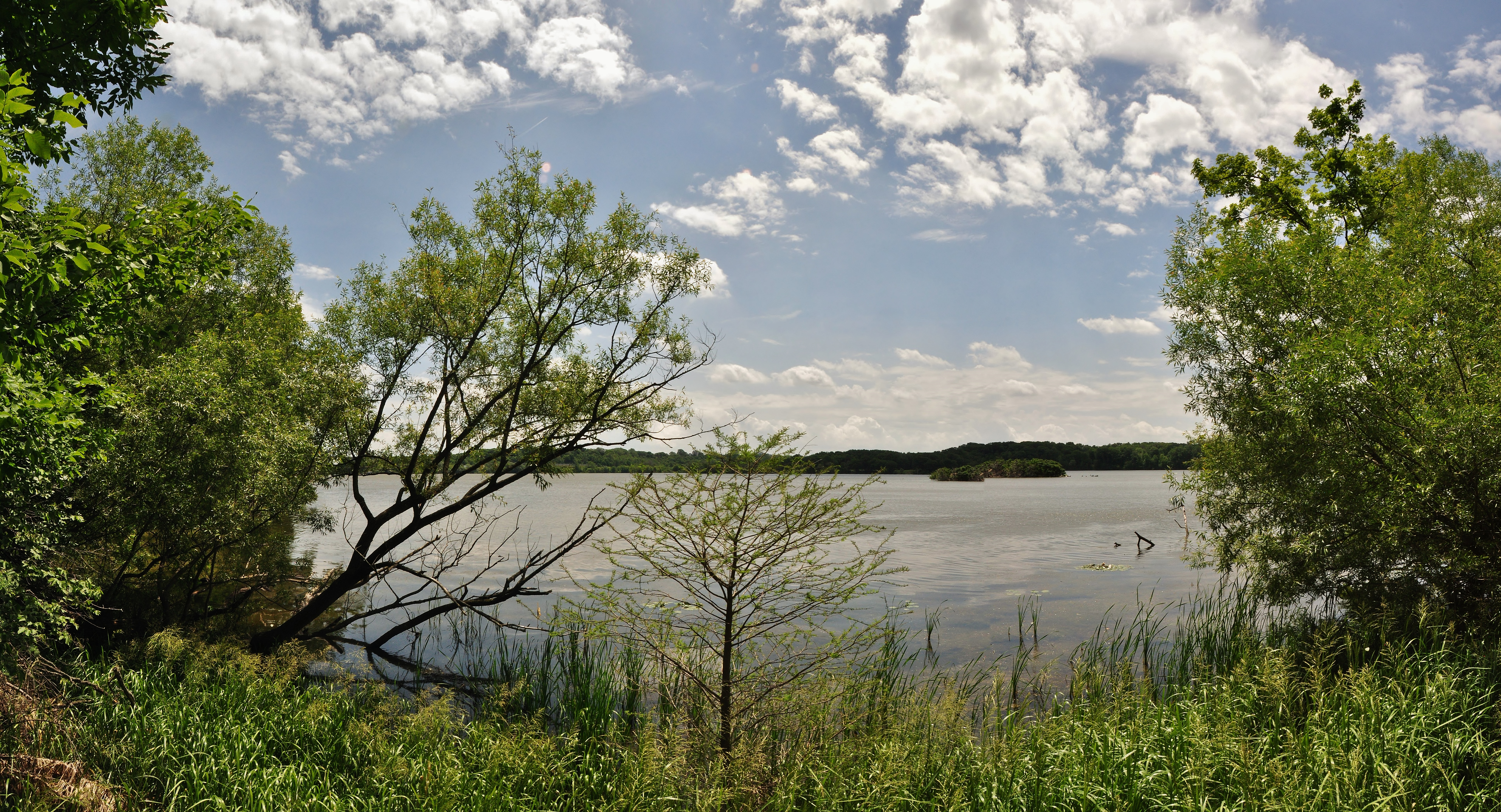
Cootes Paradise, RBG

== See also ==
- List of botanical gardens in Canada
- List of attractions in Hamilton, Ontario
- List of Canadian organizations with royal patronage
- List of UNESCO Biosphere Reserves in Canada
- Green Fleet Expo
- Toronto Botanical Garden
