= Hiawatha First Nation =

Hiawatha First Nation Hiawatha Misi-zaagiwininiwag
- Indian reserve
- Hiawatha First Nation Indian Reserve
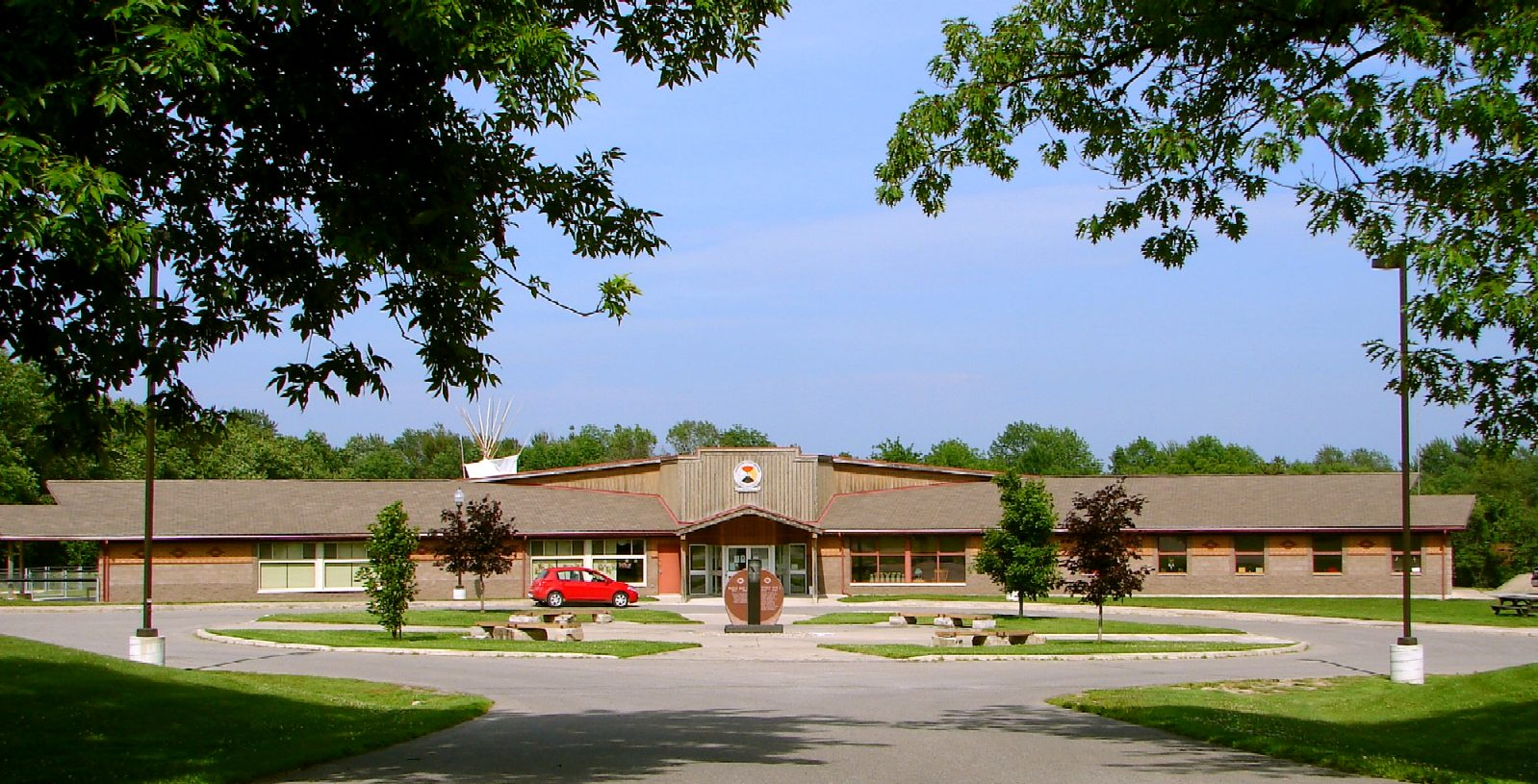

- Location within Southern Ontario
- Coordinates: 44°11′N 78°13′W
- Country: Canada
- Province: Ontario
- County: Peterborough
- First Nation: Mississaugas of Hiawatha First Nation

Area
  - Land: 8.07 km^{2} (3.12 sq mi)

Population (2011)
  - Total: 362
  - Density: 44.9/km^{2} (116/sq mi)
- Time zone: UTC-5 (EST)
  - Summer (DST): UTC-4 (EDT)
- Website: www.hiawathafirstnation.com

Hiawatha First Nation (formerly Mississaugas of Rice Lake) is a Mississauga Ojibwe First Nations reserve located on the north shore of Rice Lake east of the Otonabee River in Ontario, Canada.

It is found in Otonabee Township less than 15 kilometres south of the centre of Peterborough. Its name derives from the Haudenosaunee Confederacy co-founder Hiawatha. This First Nations reserve consists of approximately 1,952 acres (7.90 km^{2}) of land of which 1523 are under certificates of possession.

== History ==
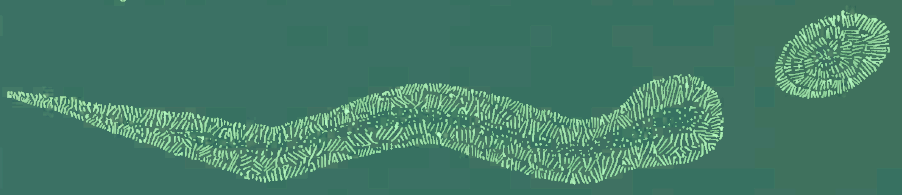
The Serpent Mounds, Canada, illustration c. 1907, from The Serpent Mound, Adams County, Ohio.

Indigenous peoples occupied this area for thousands of years before European contact. Nearly 2000 years ago, people of the Point Peninsula complex built a series of earthen mounds for ceremonial, religious and burial purposes. Archaeological excavations have shown the people had sophisticated knowledge to build the massive earthworks. Nine mounds or burial places have been located at the south end of the park. Serpent Mounds Park includes an effigy mound, four to six feet high and nearly two hundred feet long, with a related egg-shaped mound by its mouth.

== Population ==
In 2006 the population was 483, a 62.6% increase since 2001. There were 195 private dwellings.

== Indian Reserves ==
Indian reserves assigned to the First Nation are:

- Hiawatha First Nation Indian Reserve, 6 km southeast of Peterborough 868.20 ha.
- Islands in the Trent Waters Indian Reserve 36A, in Peterborough County, comprising islands in Pigeon, Buckhorn and Stony Lakes. 139.60 ha. - this reserve is shared with 2 other First Nations.
