= Otonabee–South Monaghan =

Township in Ontario, Canada

- Township (lower-tier)
- Township of Otonabee–South Monaghan
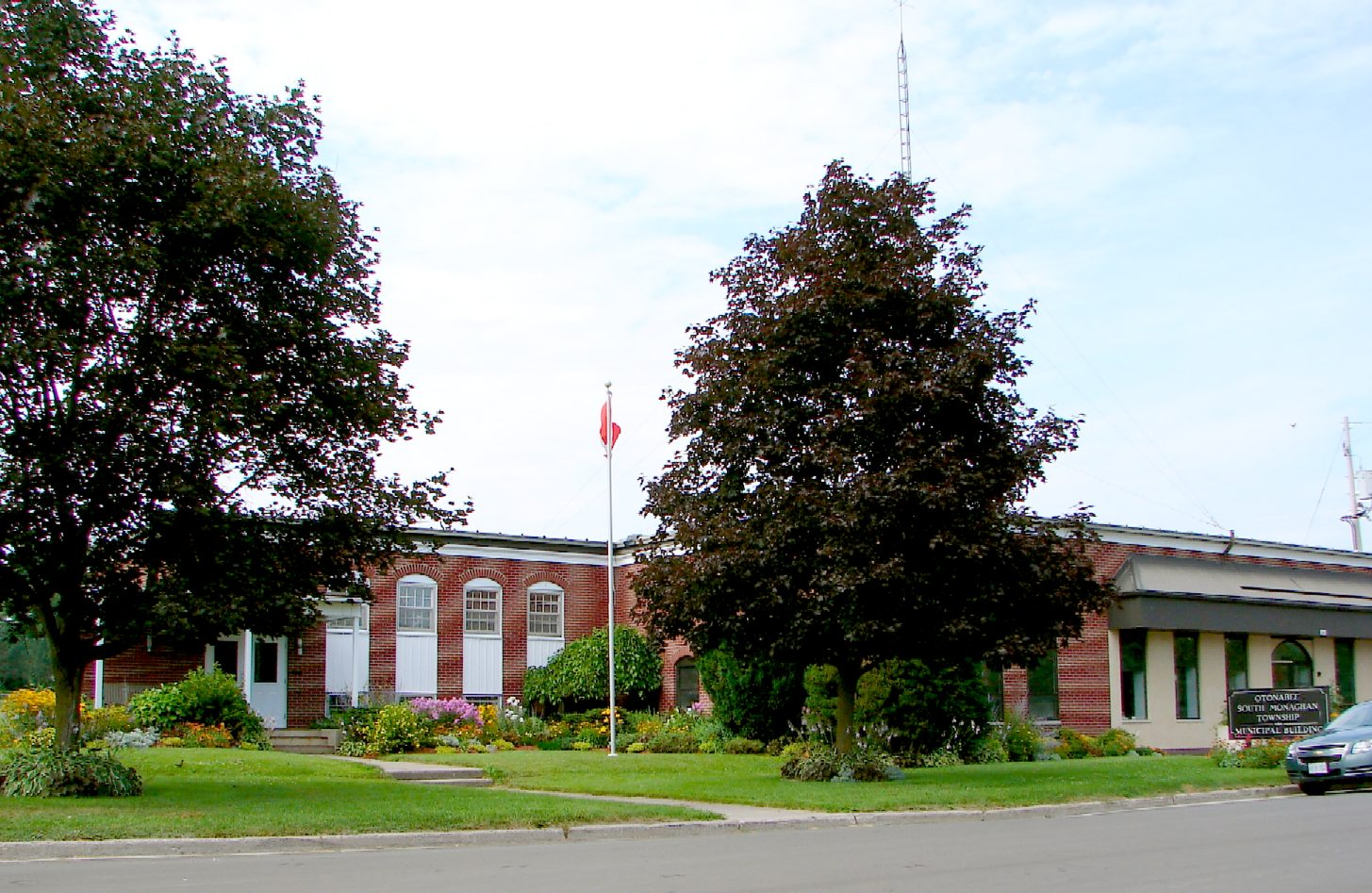
- Municipal office in the hamlet of Keene

- Location within Peterborough County Location within Southern Ontario
- Coordinates: 44°14′N 78°14′W
- Country: Canada
- Province: Ontario
- County: Peterborough
- Incorporated: January 1, 1998

Government
  - Type: Township
  - Mayor: Bonnie Clark
  - Federal riding: Peterborough
  - Prov. riding: Northumberland—Peterborough South

Area
  - Land: 346.15 km^{2} (133.65 sq mi)

Population (2021)
  - Total: 7,087
  - Density: 20.5/km^{2} (53/sq mi)
- Time zone: UTC-5 (EST)
  - Summer (DST): UTC-4 (EDT)
- Postal Code: K0L 2G0
- Area codes: 705, 249
- Website: www.osmtownship.ca

Otonabee–South Monaghan is a township in central-eastern Ontario, Canada, in Peterborough County. The township, located along the Trent–Severn Waterway, was formed on January 1, 1998, through the amalgamation of Otonabee and South Monaghan Townships.

== Geography ==
The main attraction in the area is the Serpent Mounds Campgrounds and Historical Site. It has an effigy mound in the shape of a snake, constructed as an earthwork nearly 2,000 years ago by indigenous peoples of the Hopewell culture. Formerly a Provincial Park, the government returned the site to the Hiawatha First Nation as a historically significant burial ground for the Indigenous people.

In addition to the mounds and campgrounds, the park also has a groomed beach for swimming and several kilometers of walking and biking trails. Another popular pastime in the area is fishing. Rice Lake is known to many as a great spot for some boating and fishing. There are also several resorts with water access points.

=== Communities ===
The township comprises the communities of Assumption, Bailieboro, Bensfort, Bensfort Bridge, Blezard, Cameron, Campbelltown, Drummond, Hall Landing, Indian River, Jermyn, Keene, Lang, Mathers Corners, Pengelley Landing, Pleasant Point, Stewart Hall, Villiers, Wallace Point, and Zion.

It has interesting shops, artisans, gardens, and history, with fishing and camping or resorts close at hand.

== Demographics ==
In the 2021 Census of Population conducted by Statistics Canada, Otonabee–South Monaghan had a population of 7,087 living in 2,732 of its 3,050 total private dwellings, a change of 6.3% from its 2016 population of 6,670. With a land area of 346.15 km^{2} (133.65 sq mi), it had a population density of 20.5/km^{2} (53.0/sq mi) in 2021.

Canada census – Otonabee-South Monaghan community profile

	2021	2016	2011
Population	7,087 (+6.3% from 2016)	6,670 (+1.4% from 2011)	6,660 (-2.2% from 2006)
Land area	346.15 km^{2} (133.65 sq mi)	347.13 km^{2} (134.03 sq mi)	347.58 km^{2} (134.20 sq mi)
Population density	20.5/km^{2} (53/sq mi)	19.2/km^{2} (50/sq mi)	19.2/km^{2} (50/sq mi)
Median age	49.2 (M: 49.2, F: 49.2)	49.6 (M: 49.6, F: 49.6)	47.6 (M: 47.8, F: 47.4)
Private dwellings	3,050 (total) 2,732 (occupied)	2,944 (total)	2,851 (total) 2,519 (occupied)
Median household income	$97,000	$79,760	$77,512

References: 2021 2016 2011

Otonabee–South Monaghan historical populations

Year	Pop.	±%
1996	6,749	—
2001	6,669	−1.2%
2006	6,934	+4.0%

Year	Pop.	±%
2011	6,660	−4.0%
2016	6,670	+0.2%
2021	7,087	+6.3%

Population counts are not adjusted for boundary changes.
Source: Statistics Canada

Mother tongue (2021):

- English as first language: 94.2%
- French as first language: 1.1%
- English and French as first language: 0.4%
- Other as first language: 3.6%

== Attractions ==
Lang Pioneer Village Museum is a living history museum located in Lang.

The Lang-Hastings Trail is a 33 km rail trail that runs between Peterborough and Hastings, and passes through Keene and other areas. It is part of the Trans-Canada Trail, the longest trail build in the country.

The Otonabee-South Monaghan Public Library is located in Keene.

Funded in 2007, the Keene Pumpkin Festival is a annual Fall Festival that features vendors, a car show, and petting zoo.

== Transportation ==
The area is served by the small Keene/Elmhirst's Resort Airport and Keene/Elmhirst's Resort Water Aerodrome.

== Education ==
Keene has a school of approximately 600 students called North Shore Public School. This school is the main elementary school for families in Keene, as well as those on outlying farms. North Shore is a feeder school for Thomas A. Stewart Secondary School.

== See also ==
- List of townships in Ontario
