= Mississaugas =

Subtribe of the First Nations people in southern Ontario, Canada

Range of Anishinaabe-Anishinini around 1800, including the Mississauga in dark blue

The Mississaugas are a group of First Nations peoples located in southern Ontario, Canada. They are a sub-group of the Ojibwe Nation.

== Etymology ==
The name Mississauga comes from the Anishinaabe word Misi-zaagiing, meaning '[those at the] Great River-mouth'. It is closely related to the Ojibwe word Miswe-zaagiing, which means 'a river with many outlets'.

== History ==
According to the oral histories of the Anishinaabe, after departing the "Second Stopping Place" near Niagara Falls, the core Anishinaabe peoples migrated along the shores of Lake Erie to what is now southern Michigan. They became "lost" both physically and spiritually. The Mississauga migrated along a northern route by the Credit River, to Georgian Bay. These were considered their historic traditional lands on the shores of Lake Superior and northern Lake Huron around the Mississagi River. The Mississauga called for the core Anishinaabeg to Midewiwin, meaning 'return to the path of the good life'. The core Anishinaabe peoples formed the Council of Three Fires and migrated from their "Third Stopping Place" near the present city of Detroit to their "Fourth Stopping Place" on Manitoulin Island, along the eastern shores of Georgian Bay.

The homelands of the Mississaugas were originally claimed by the Huron/Wyandot, who were driven off by the Iroquois in the Beaver Wars in 1649/50. The Ojibwe Anishinaabe then moved into the area around 1700, pushing out the Iroquois. The French had previously called an Anishinaabe band near the Mississagi River Oumisagai or Mississauga and for unknown reasons began to apply that name to the Ojibwe who took over the lands immediately north of Lake Ontario. On the 1675 Carte du Mississippi et des lacs Supérieur, Michigan et Huron, the Mississauga were recorded as "Missisakingdachirinouek" (Misi-zaaging dash ininweg: "Regular-speakers of the Great River-mouth"). This was not how the Mississaugas originally knew themselves, but they eventually adopted the name and use it today.

When Conrad Weiser conducted a census in Logstown in 1748, he identified the people as Tisagechroamis, his attempt at conveying the sound of their exonym name in Wendat. Other variants of this spelling were Tisagechroamis, Tisaghechroamis, Tisagechroan, Tisagechroanu, and Zisaugeghroanu. "The Tisagechroanu were the Mississagas from Lake Huron, a large tribe of French Indians, or under French influences. The name Tisagechroanue here is probably a misprint, for it is most often found Zisaugeghroanu."

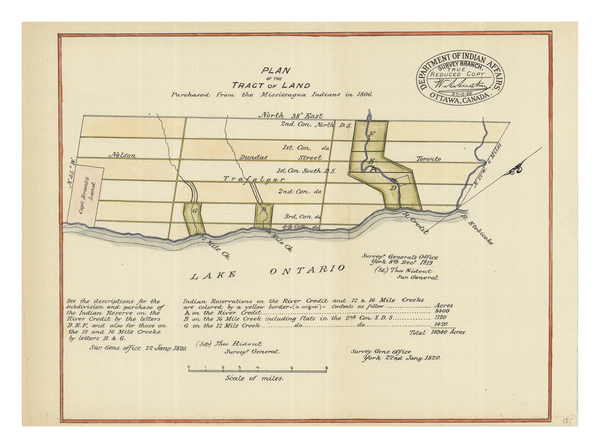
Map shows the subdivisions and purchase of the Indian Reserve on the Credit River, and 12 Mile and 16 Mile creeks. The purchase took place in 1806, but this map was published in 1820 by the Department of Indian Affairs.

Starting in 1781 during the waning years of the American Revolutionary War, the Crown purchased land which encompassed much of present-day southern Ontario from the Mississauga in a series of transactions. They purchased the land to fulfill promises made in the Haldimand Proclamation concerning land promised to the Iroquois for their support for the Crown during the war, and to compensate the Iroquois for losing territory to American colonists. The sale of land by the Mississaugas of the Credit to the Crown was referred to as the "Between the Lakes Treaty."

In 1848, the Iroquois granted land to the Mississauga within the former's Six Nations Reserve on Grand River. The Mississauga became established on the New Credit. Beginning in the 19th century, the Mississauga sought to gain compensation for the land granted to them but given to other settlers. In the 21st century, the Canadian government awarded the Mississauga of the New Credit First Nation nearly $145 million in settlement of this land claim.

== Legacy ==
- The city of Mississauga is named after them.
- The Western and Eastern massasauga rattlesnake (Sistrurus catenatus) are named after them.
- Fort Mississauga is named after them.

== Today ==
All the Mississaugas are a subset of the Ojibwe nation of 200,000 people.

Historically, there were five First Nations that made up the Mississauga Nations. Today, there are six, listed here along with their historical counterparts, where applicable:

- Mississauga First Nation — Mississagi River 8 Reserve
  - Mississaugas of Chibaouinani (historical)
- Alderville First Nation (formerly: Mississaugas of Alnwick) — Alderville First Nation Reserve, Sugar Island 37A Reserve
- Mississaugas of the Credit (historical)
  - Mississaugas of Beldom (historical)
  - Mississaugas of the Credit First Nation — New Credit 40A Reserve. One of the largest communities; as of 2005, the Mississaugas of the Credit had a population of 1,375.
- Mississaugas of Matchedash (historical)
- Mississaugas of Rice Lake, Mud Lake and Scugog Lake (historical)
  - Curve Lake First Nation (formerly: Mississaugas of Mud Lake) — Curve Lake First Nation 35 Reserve, Curve Lake 35A Reserve and Islands in the Trent Waters Indian Reserve 36A
  - Mississaugas of Grape Island (historical)
  - Hiawatha First Nation (formerly: Mississaugas of Rice Lake) — Hiawatha First Nation Indian Reserve, Islands in the Trent Waters Indian Reserve 36A
  - Mississaugas of Scugog Island First Nation — Mississaugas of Scugog Island Reserve, Islands in the Trent Waters Indian Reserve 36A

== Notable people ==
- Peter Jones (1802–1856), Mississauga missionary and writer
- Edmonia Lewis (ca. 1844–1907), Mississauga Ojibwe/African-American sculptor
- Quenippenon, Mississauga Chief

== See also ==
- Crawford Purchase
- Toronto Purchase
