= Lewiston Mound =

- U.S. National Register of Historic Places
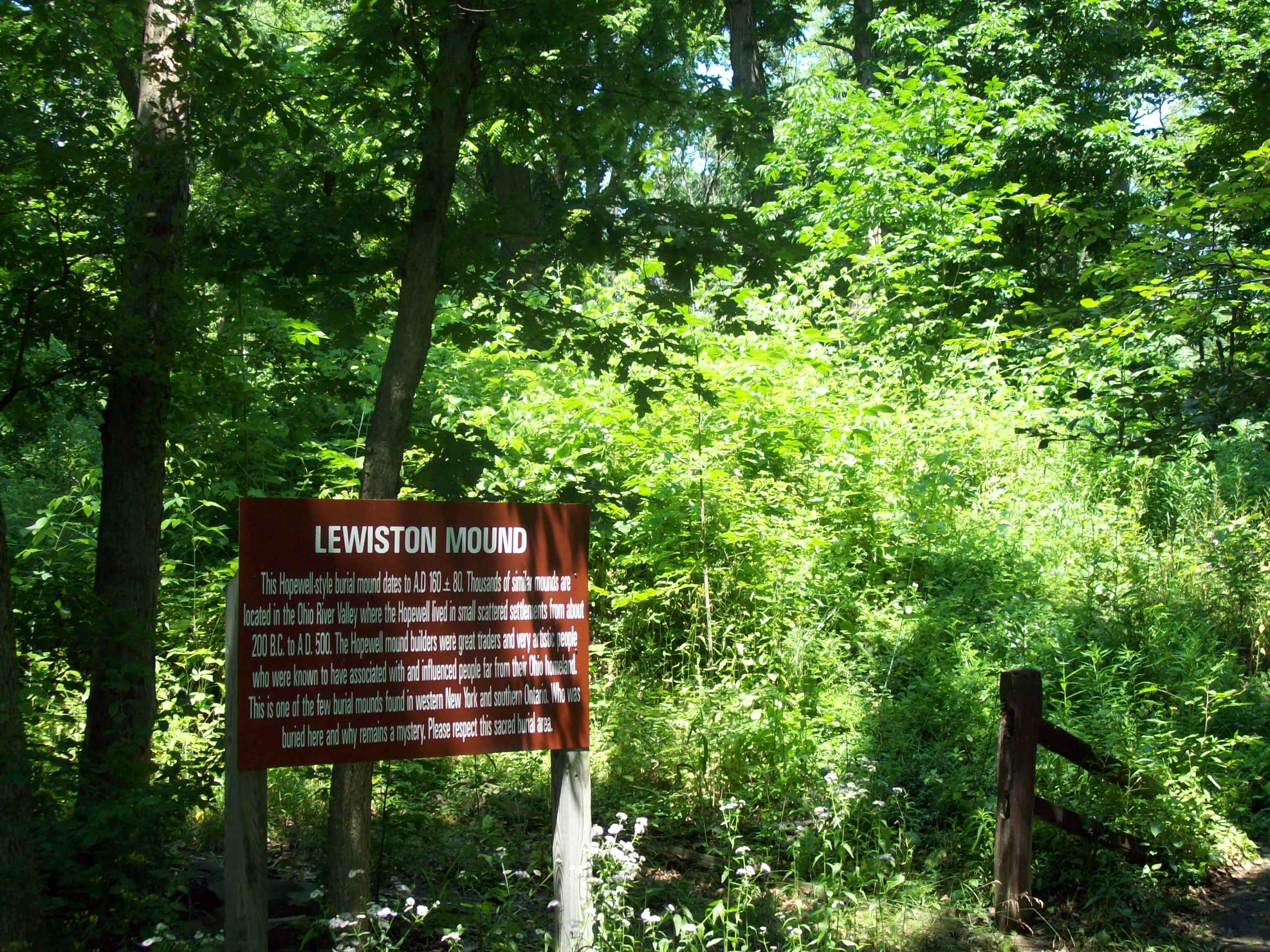
- Lewiston Mound archaeological site
- Nearest city: Lewiston, New York
- Architect: Hopewell tradition
- Architectural style: Tumulus-burial mound
- NRHP reference No.: 74001279
- Added to NRHP: January 21, 1974

Lewiston Mound is a prehistoric burial mound built by the indigenous peoples of the Hopewell tradition. It is located on the grounds of the Earl W. Brydges Artpark State Park, at Lewiston in Niagara County, New York.

Lewiston Mound was listed on the National Register of Historic Places in 1974.

== Gallery ==
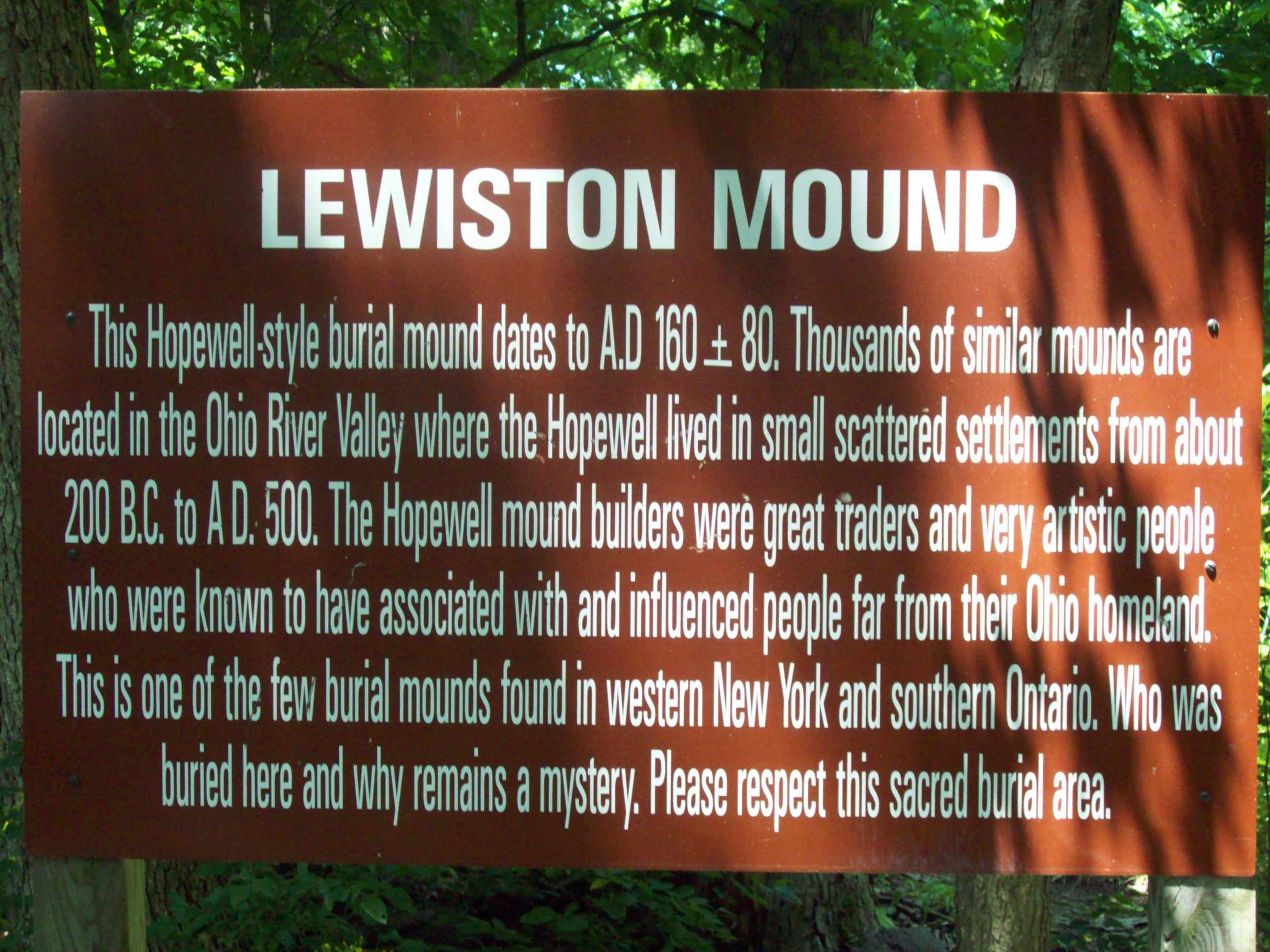
Lewiston Mound Sign

== See also ==
- List of Hopewell sites
