= Curve Lake 35A =

- Indian reserve
- Curve Lake Indian Reserve No. 35A
- Location within Southern Ontario
- Coordinates: 44°28′14″N 78°24′09″W
- Country: Canada
- Province: Ontario
- County: Peterborough
- First Nation: Curve Lake

Area
  - Land: 2.02 km^{2} (0.78 sq mi)

Curve Lake 35A is a First Nations reserve on Fox Island, as well as other adjacent islands including Boyd Island, Joe Island, Red Rock Island and Rottenstone Island, in Buckhorn Lake, Ontario, Canada. It is one of three reserves of the Curve Lake First Nation.
