= Islands in the Trent Waters 36A =

- Indian reserve
- Islands in the Trent Waters Indian Reserve No. 36A
- Location within Southern Ontario
- Coordinates: 44°31′N 78°22′W
- Country: Canada
- Province: Ontario
- District: Peterborough
- First Nations: Curve Lake, Hiawatha, Mississaugas of Scugog Island

Islands in the Trent Waters 36A is a First Nations reserve about 15 kilometres north of Peterborough, Ontario, Canada, on scattered islands in the Kawartha lakes, including Buckhorn Lake, Pigeon Lake, Lower Buckhorn Lake, Lovesick Lake and Stony Lake. The largest concentration of such islands are in Lower Buckhorn and Lovesick Lakes. It is inhabited, mainly seasonally, by members of the Curve Lake, Hiawatha, and Scugog First Nations, who jointly share it.
