= Conestogo =

Conestogo may refer to:

- Conestogo, Ontario, Canada
  - Conestogo Public School (see List of Waterloo Region, Ontario schools)
  - Conestogo Wind Energy Centre, operated by NextEra Energy
- Conestogo Crown Game Preserve, Ontario, Canada
- Conestogo Lake, Ontario, Canada
  - Conestogo Lake Conservation Area, operated by the Grand River Conservation Authority
- Conestogo River, Ontario, Canada

== See also ==
- Conestoga (disambiguation)
