= Riverbank, Ontario =

Riverbank
- Unincorporated rural community
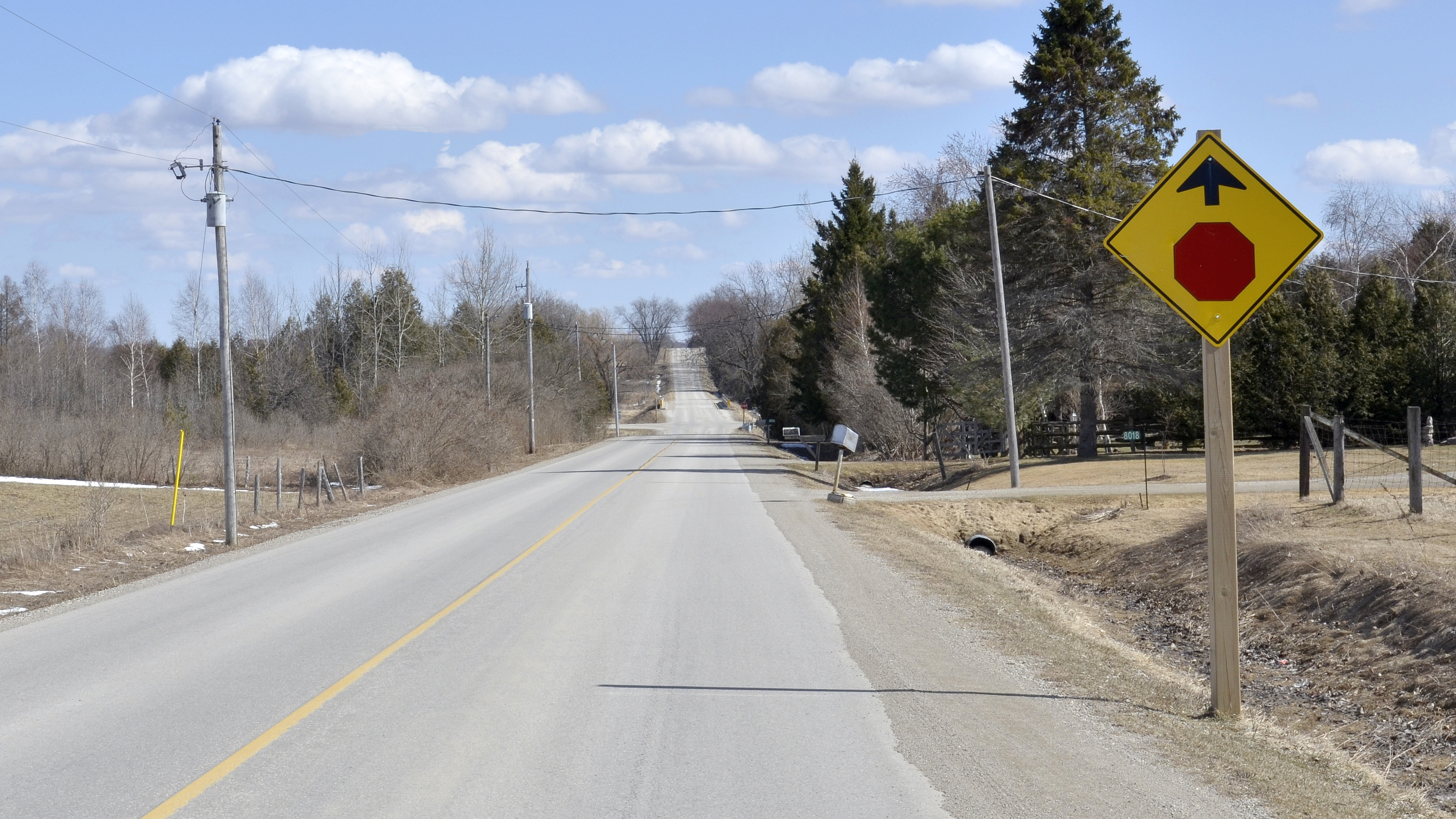
- Looking east on Concession Road 16 in Riverbank

- Location within Canada Location within Ontario
- Coordinates: 43°49′11″N 80°37′26″W
- Country: Canada
- Province: Ontario
- County: Wellington
- Township: Mapleton
- Time zone: UTC-5 (Eastern (EST))
  - Summer (DST): UTC-4 (EDT)
- GNBC Code: FENHW

Riverbank is an unincorporated rural community in Mapleton Township, Wellington County, Ontario, Canada. Prior to 1999, Riverbank was located in Maryborough Township.

The Conestogo River flows through Riverbank.

== History ==
A post office was located in Riverbank from 1877 to 1915.

The Riverbank Cheese and Butter Company was located at the settlement from 1882 to 1893.

By 1910, Riverbank had a general store, and a daily stage to Drayton. The population was about 50.
