= Conestoga =

Conestoga or Conestogo may refer to:

== Places ==
- Conestogo, Ontario, a village north of Waterloo, Ontario (also spelled Conestoga)
- Conestoga Township, Lancaster County, Pennsylvania
- Conestoga, Pennsylvania, an unincorporated community and census-designated place (CDP) in Lancaster County
- Conestoga Lake, Nebraska, United States
- Conestogo Lake, Ontario, Canada
- Conestoga Mall (Grand Island, Nebraska)
- Conestoga Mall (Waterloo, Ontario), a shopping centre in Waterloo, Ontario
- Conestoga Parkway, a freeway in Waterloo Region, Ontario, Canada
- Conestoga River, a tributary of the Susquehanna River in the state of Pennsylvania
- Conestogo River, a river near Waterloo, Ontario

=== Schools ===
- Conestoga High School, a public high school in Devon-Berwyn, Pennsylvania
- Conestoga Middle School, a public 6-8 school in the Beaverton School District
- Conestoga College Institute of Technology and Advanced Learning is a public college located in Kitchener, Ontario, Canada

== Vehicles ==
- Conestoga wagon, a covered horse-drawn wagon
  - USS Conestoga, any of the three United States Navy ships named after the wagon
- Conestoga (truck), a truck or truck trailer equipped with a soft roof and sides supported by a removable frame designed to protect cargo during transport similar to a closed truck while allowing by removal of the roof and sides for loading by forklift or crane, so named due to the resemblance to a Conestoga wagon.
- Conestoga (rocket), the world's first privately funded commercial rocket, produced from Minuteman I stages
- Conestoga (ship), a wrecked steamship in the Thousand Islands which is a popular Scuba diving site
- C-93 Conestoga, a cargo aircraft
- AL-60C-5 Conestoga, a variant of the Aermacchi AL.60 utility aircraft

== Other uses ==
- Conestoga people, alternate name for the Susquehannock people of Pennsylvania
- Conestoga (convention), an annual literary science fiction convention held in Tulsa, Oklahoma
- Conestoga Church of the Brethren, a congregation related to Conrad Beissel at the Ephrata Cloister
- Conestoga Cigar, also known as a "stogie"
- Conestoga Massacre, Pennsylvania by the Paxton Boys in 1763
- Conestoga Traction Company, a former American regional interurban trolley operated out of Lancaster, Pennsylvania
- Conestoga, the company that manufactures the Big-Bang Cannon
