= Stirton, Ontario =

Stirton
- Unincorporated rural community
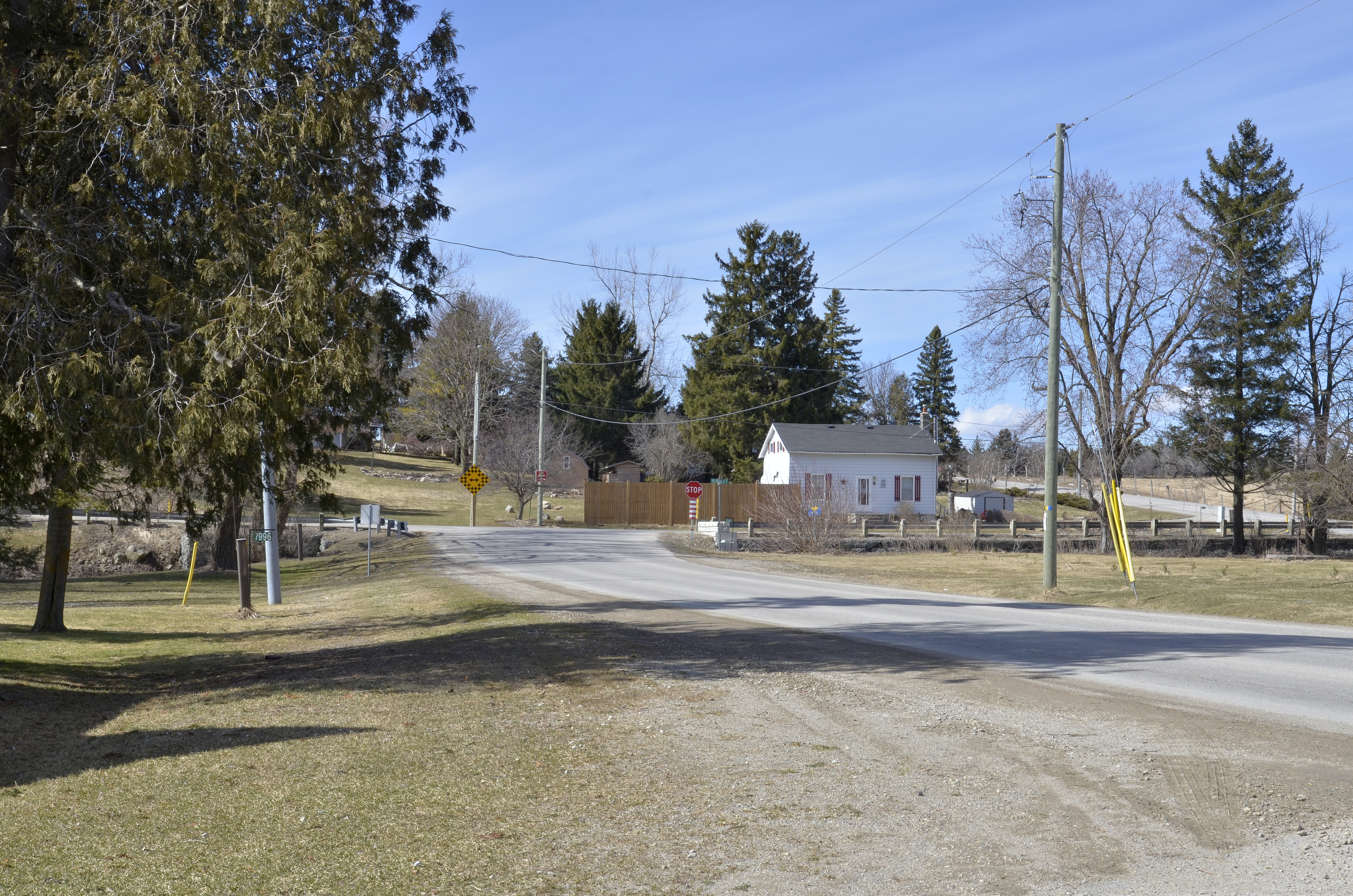
- Looking northwest on 8th Line at County Road 11 in Stirton

- Location of Stirton in Canada Stirton (Ontario)
- Coordinates: 43°44′02″N 80°41′18″W
- Country: Canada
- Province: Ontario
- County: Wellington
- Township: Mapleton
- Time zone: UTC-5 (Eastern (EST))
  - Summer (DST): UTC-4 (EDT)
- GNBC Code: FCSOW

Stirton is an unincorporated rural community in Mapleton Township, Wellington County, Ontario, Canada.

The Conestogo River flows 0.85 km (0.53 mi) west of Stirton, and the land between the settlement and the river are part of the Conestogo Lake Conservation Area.

Stirton prospered from the mid-1800s to the early 1900s.

== History ==
The settlement was named for David Stirton, a member of the House of Commons from 1857 to 1876.

A map of Stirton from the 1850s showed that the settlement had 16 lots. Many were sold between 1856 and 1868.

The settlement was divided into two sections, Upper Stirton and Lower Stirton, located about 1 km (0.62 mi) apart. Mills were located in one section, while merchants and residences were located in the other.

A post office operated from 1863 to 1910, and local merchant John Sanderson was the first postmaster. The early settlement also had a blacksmith shop, tannery, cooper, shoe shop, harness maker, general store, carriage maker, two churches, and three carpenters. A flax mill was built in 1867, and employed about 60 people. The Hotel Stirton operated during the late 1860s.

In 1871, Stirton was receiving mail daily, and had a population of 150.

Many of Stirton's businesses were abandoned by 1900, and the Methodist church in Stirton existed until 1929.

During the early 1950s, construction began on a dam located 7 km (4.3 mi) south of Stirton, across the Conestogo River. The completed dam would flood a large area southwest of Stirton, and create Conestogo Lake. In 1956, a news article suggested that Stirton would become "a livelier centre as tourists drive around the new lake and over the only bridge across the Conestogo River at the north end of the lake". Stirton failed to become more popular following the completion of the dam in 1958.
