= Stirton =

Stirton is a surname. Notable people with the surname include:

- Brent Stirton, photographer
- David Stirton (1816–1908), Canadian politician
- James Stirton (1833–1917), Scottish botanist and physician
- Robert Stirton Thornton (1863–1936), Canadian politician
- Ruben Arthur Stirton (1901–1966), American paleontologist

== See also ==
- Stirton Smith (1926–2010), Scottish footballer
- Stirton with Thorlby
- Stirton's Deer Mouse
- Stirton, Ontario
