= Yatton (disambiguation) =

Yatton is a village in Somerset, England.

Yatton may also refer to

- Yatton, Aymestrey in Herefordshire (near Leominster)
- Yatton, east Herefordshire (near Ross-on-Wye)
- Yatton, Ontario, Canada
- Yatton railway station, Somerset, England
- Yatton dæmoniac
- Yatton Keynell, Wiltshire, England
