= Yatton, Ontario =

Yatton
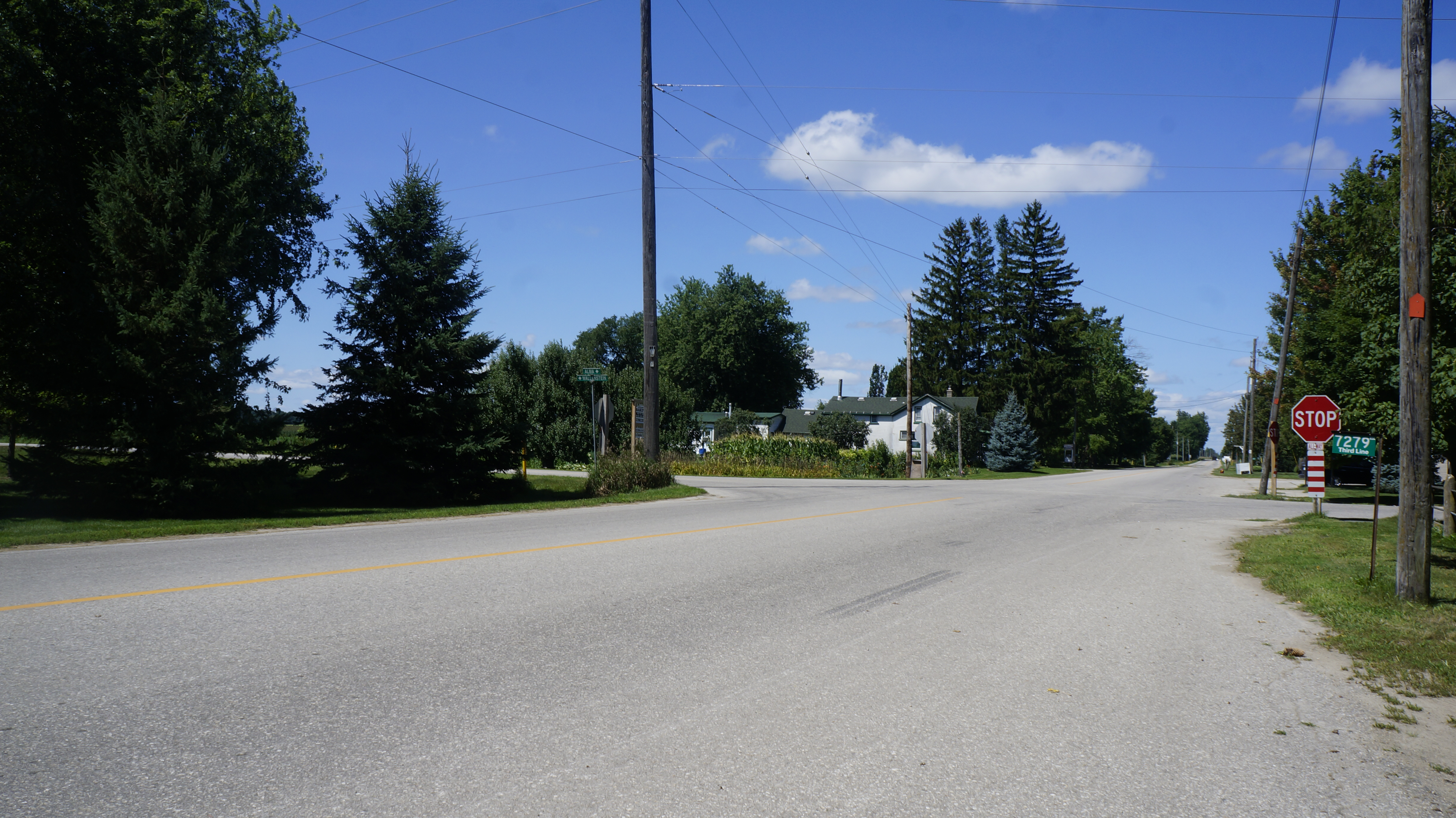

- Location of Yatton in Ontario
- Coordinates: 43°59′N 80°59′W
- Country: Canada
- Province: Ontario
- County: Wellington County
- Elevation: 380 m (1,250 ft)
- Time zone: UTC-5 (EST)
  - Summer (DST): UTC-4 (EDT)
- Area codes: 905, 519

Yatton is an unincorporated rural community in Mapleton Township, Wellington County, Ontario, Canada.

== History ==
The area was settled by people in the early 1820s, when Black Loyalists, African-Canadians and African-American immigrants arrived to the wilderness of the Queen's Bush. The majority was settled down between Peel Township (Wellington County) and Wellesley Township (Waterloo County). Until the late 1840s the Queen's Bush remained an unorganized territory. Three African-Canadian churches was constructed in the Queen's Bush and one of them was in Yatton, reverend Samuel H. Brown established that on his farm.
