= Alma, Ontario =

Alma
- Unincorporated rural community
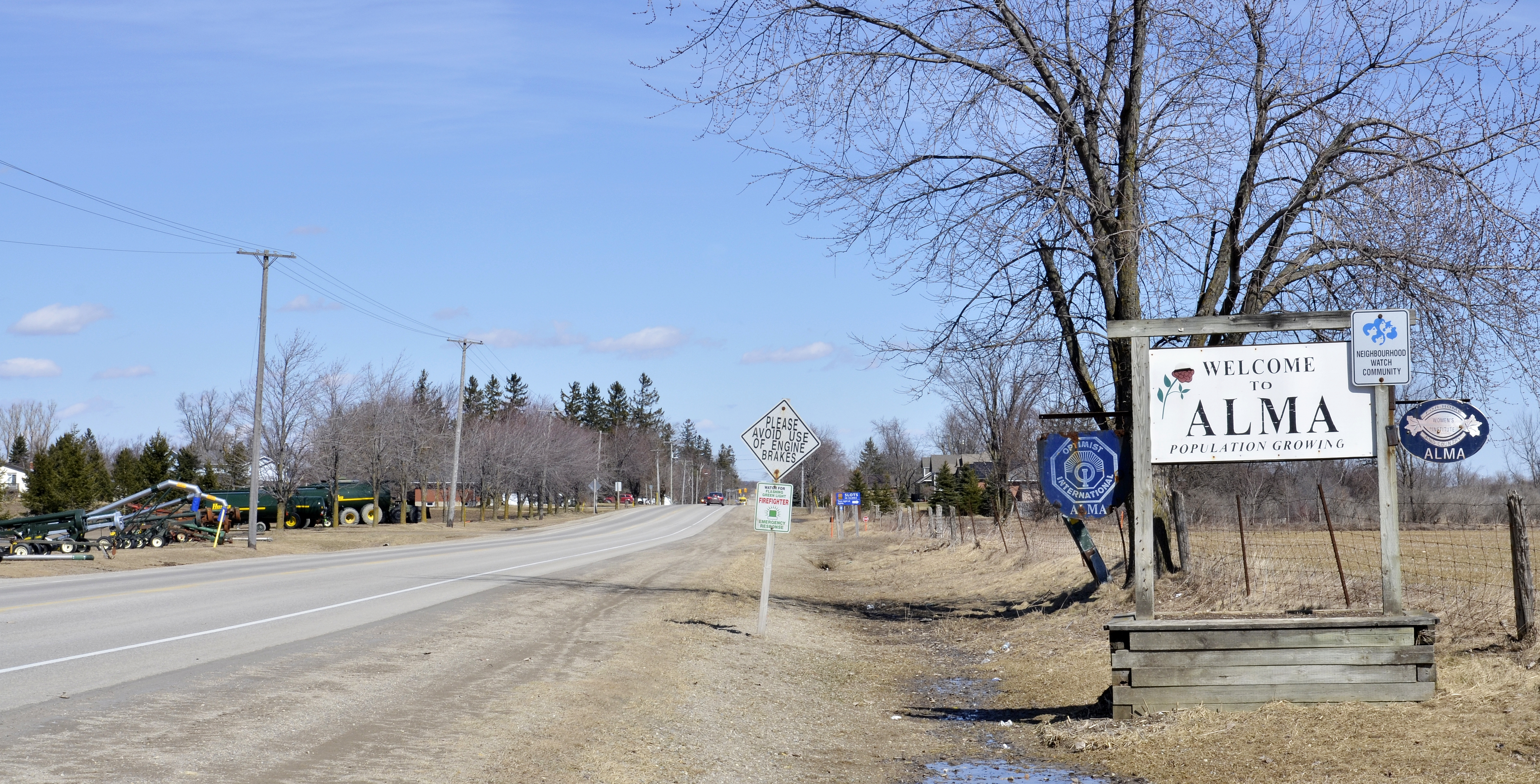
- Entering Alma along County Road 17

- Location of Alma in Canada Alma (Ontario)
- Coordinates: 43°43′49″N 80°30′08″W
- Country: Canada
- Province: Ontario
- County: Wellington
- Township: Mapleton
- Time zone: UTC-5 (Eastern (EST))
  - Summer (DST): UTC-4 (EDT)
- GNBC Code: FACPP

Alma is an unincorporated rural community in Mapleton Township, Wellington County, Ontario, Canada.

== History ==
Pioneers began settling along the Elora Saugeen Road, which forms the main street of Alma, during the 1840s.

Alexander MacCrea and his wife settled here in 1848, and built a store. The "MacCrae's Corners" post office was established in 1854, and MacCrae was postmaster.

In 1854, the settlement's name was changed from MacCrae's Corners to "Alma", after the Battle of Alma.

James Ledingham and his family moved to Alma in 1864, and built a saw and chopping mill.

In 1865, St. Andrew's Presbyterian Church was established in Alma. The church moved to a new stone church in Alma in 1892.

The Wellington, Grey and Bruce Railway built a line through Alma in 1870. The line was eventually taken over by Canadian National Railway, and was abandoned in 1983. The Alma railroad station has since been destroyed.

After the railway was constructed, Alma became "a bustling service centre for the local settlers and travellers". Alma was noted for having a post office, wagon maker, weaver, telegraph office, shoemaker, grist mill, several saw mills, several stores, three churches, and four hotels. In 1879, the population was 250.

Wallace Cummings Park in Alma was constructed in 2003 on 25 ha (62 acres) of donated land. The park features a playground, walking trail, toboggan hill, picnic shelter, community hall, wetland boardwalk, and garden labyrinth.

== Education ==
Alma Public School, part of the Upper Grand District School Board, is located in Alma.

== Notable people ==
- James Scarth Gale (1863 – 1937), Presbyterian missionary, educator and Bible translator in Korea.
- George Alexander McQuibban (1886 – 1937), physician and member of the Legislative Assembly of Ontario. McQuibban lived in Alma and had a practice there.

== Gallery ==
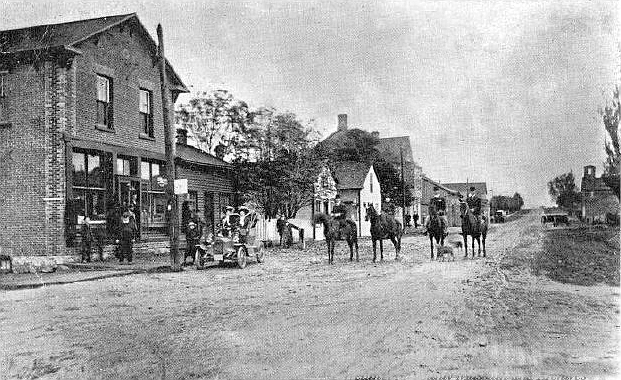
Alma, 1910

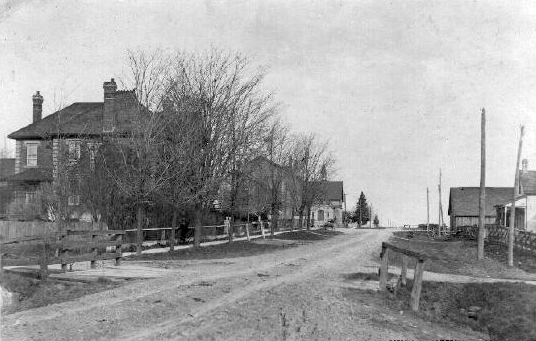
Houses on Peel Street, 1910

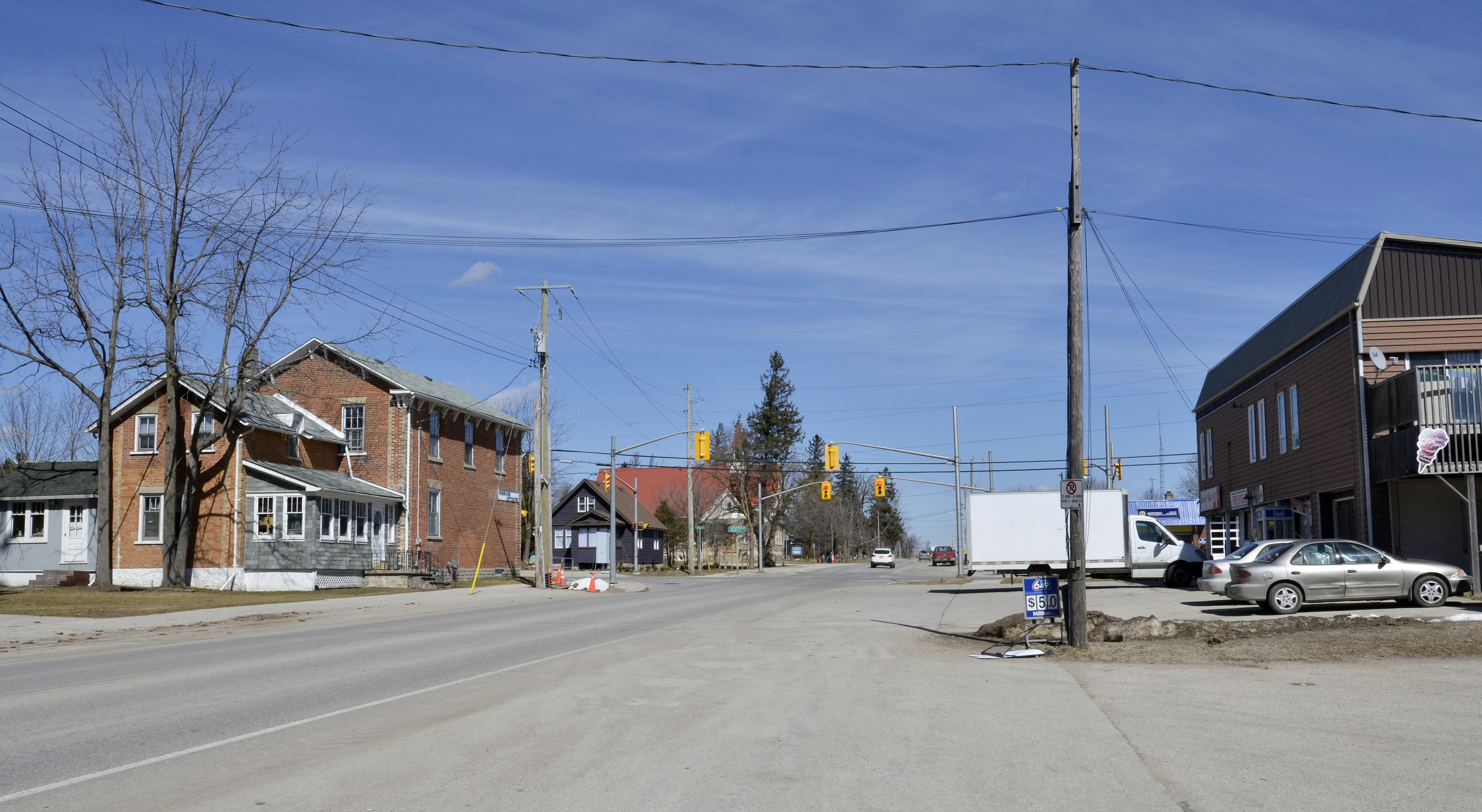
Alma, 2017

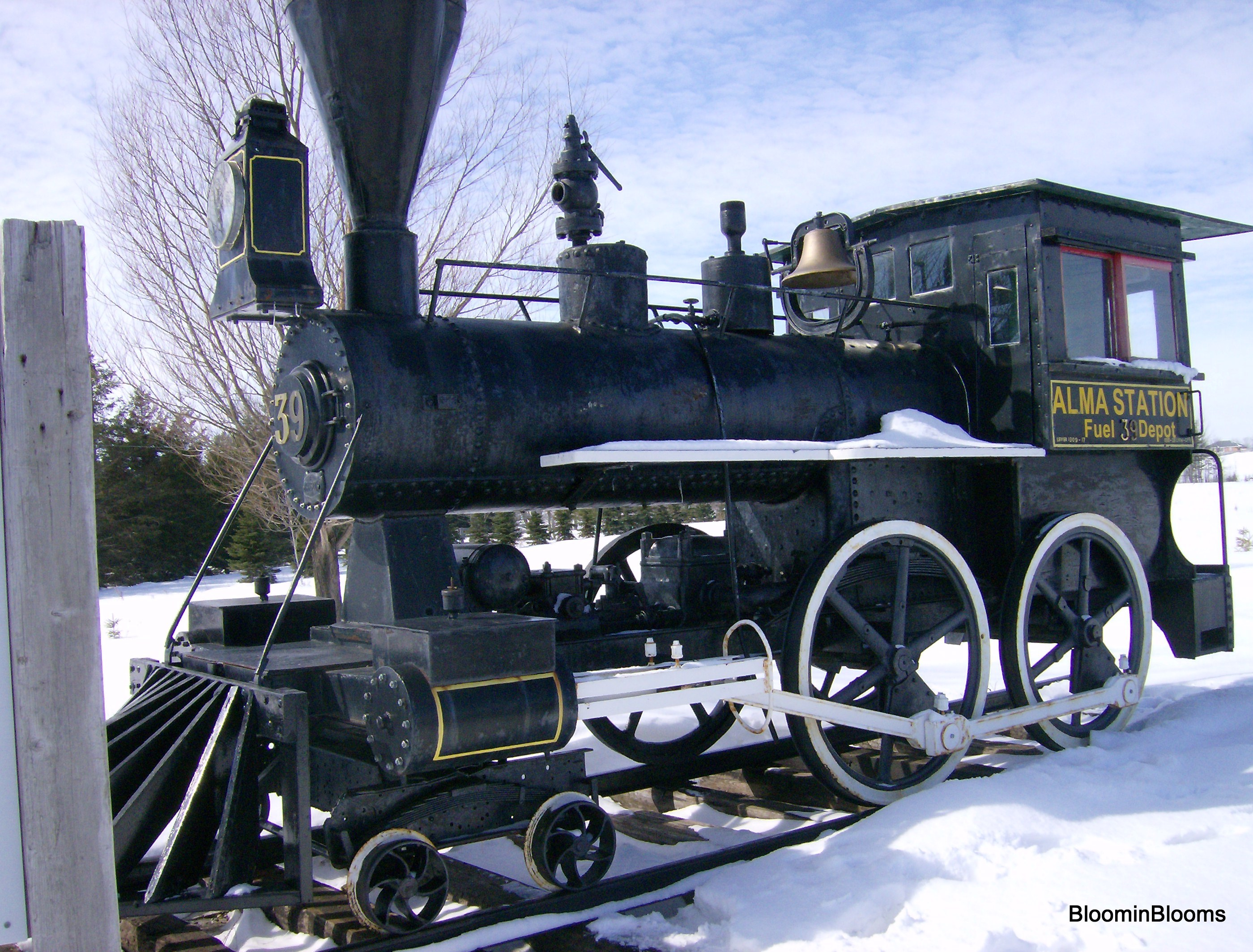
Historic locomotive near the former railroad station
