= Southwestern Ontario =

- Secondary region
- From top to bottom, left to right: Kingsville, Windsor, Chatham-Kent, Amherstburg

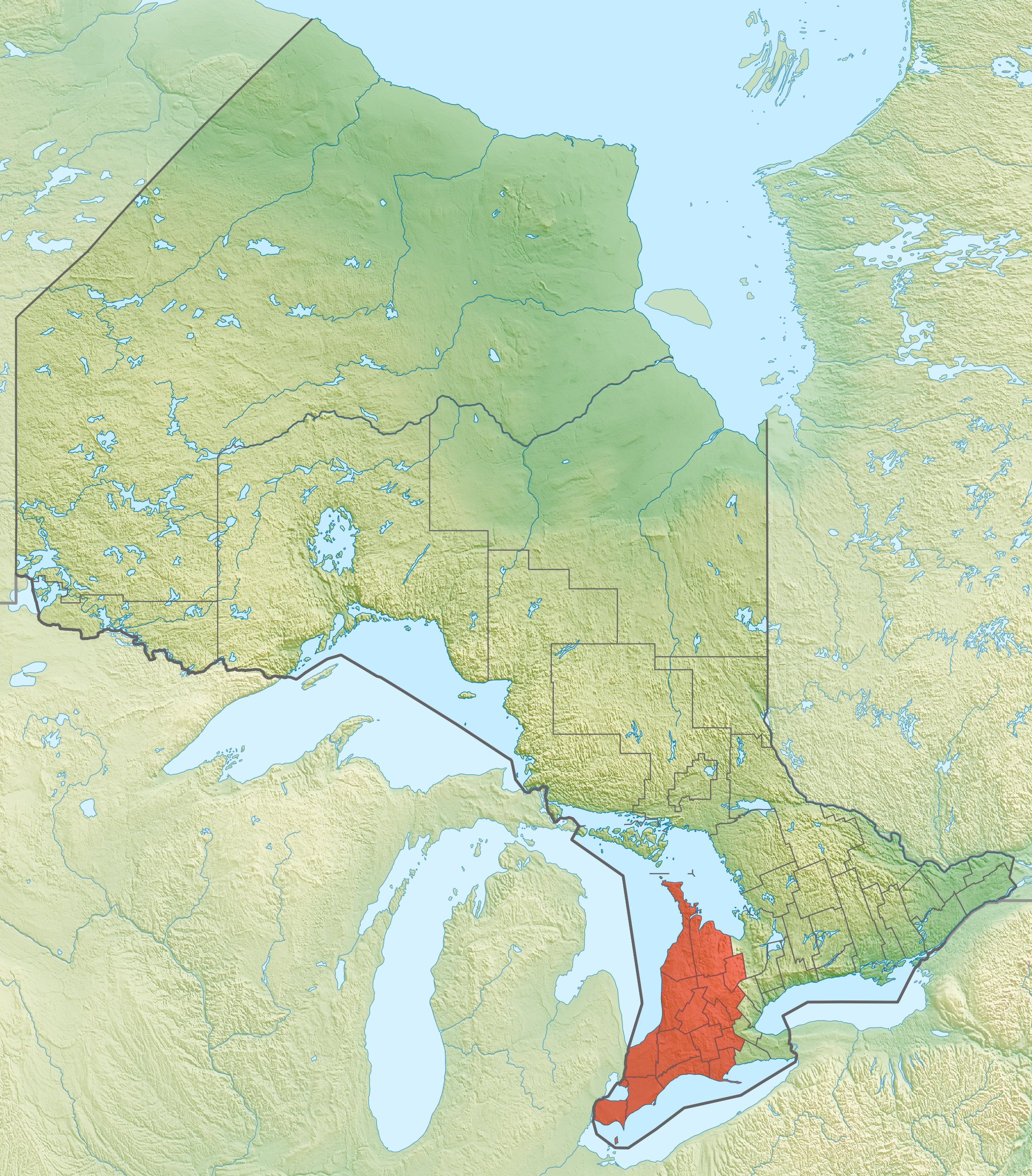
- Coordinates: 43°30′N 81°00′W
- Country: Canada
- Province: Ontario

Area
  - Total: 36,797.54 km^{2} (14,207.61 sq mi)

Population (2021)
  - Total: 2,796,367
  - Density: 75.99331/km^{2} (196.8218/sq mi)
- Time zone: UTC−05:00 (EST)
  - Summer (DST): UTC−04:00 (EDT)
- Postal code prefixes: N
- Area codes: 519, 226, 548, 905, 289, 365

Southwestern Ontario, also known as Ontario's Southwest, (2021 population: 2,796,367) is a secondary region of Southern Ontario in the Canadian province of Ontario. It occupies most of the Ontario Peninsula, bounded by Lake Huron (including Georgian Bay) to the north and northwest, the St. Clair River, Lake St. Clair, and Detroit River to the west, and Lake Erie to the south. To the east, on land, Southwestern Ontario is bounded by Central Ontario and the Golden Horseshoe. It borders the United States via Lower Michigan.

== Definitions ==
Southwestern Ontario is often not consistently defined. In certain documents, the Government of Ontario classifies municipalities along the eastern side of Southwestern Ontario near the Grand River, including Brant County, Waterloo Region, and Wellington County, as part of the Greater Golden Horseshoe region that surrounds western Lake Ontario, mainly due to the presence of modern transportation connections that link these areas to the core sections of the Golden Horseshoe. A more traditional definition of the region's boundary can be traced back to early colonial districts in the British Province of Quebec and Upper Canada. The Western District, originally known as the Hesse District from 1788 to 1792, was originally designated as everything west of a north-south line intersecting the extreme projection of Long Point into Lake Erie, which roughly follows the eastern boundaries of modern Brant, Grey, Dufferin, Norfolk, and Wellington Counties.

The northern portion of Southwestern Ontario is sometimes referred to as Midwestern Ontario. This area includes Bruce, Grey, Dufferin, Huron, Perth, and Wellington Counties, corresponding roughly with the historical boundaries of Queen's Bush, an area of crown land that did not see formal subdivision or wide-scale settlement until the 1830s.

== History ==
Indigenous peoples had occupied Southwestern Ontario for thousands of years prior to European settlement. Archaeological sites such as the Princess Point Complex and the Parkhill Complex indicate the presence of Paleo-Indians in the area dating back approximately 11,000 years. First Nations peoples located in the region included Anishinaabe, Algonquin, Haudenosaunee (Iroquois), and Wendat peoples.

Initial European settlement and colonization of the region occurred in the 17th and 18th centuries by the French as part of the colony of Canada within New France. The oldest continually inhabited European settlement in Southwestern Ontario is Windsor, which originated as a southerly extension of the settlement of Fort Detroit in 1701 and was established as la Petite Côte in 1749. Further development occurred under the British as part of the Province of Quebec from 1763 to 1791, and eventually the Province of Upper Canada from 1791 to 1841. One of the earliest British settlements, Port Talbot, was settled by Thomas Talbot in 1803, and was amongst the first successful settlements due to the construction of Talbot Trail, one of the earliest major roads in the region. Kitchener, originally known as Ebytown and later Berlin, was established by German Mennonite and Pennsylvania Dutch settlers in 1807, after sections of the Haldimand Tract were purchased from the Six Nations in 1798. London, originally called Georgiana upon its selection in 1793 as the potential site of the future capital of Upper Canada, was formally founded in 1826 by John Graves Simcoe, the first Lieutenant Governor of Upper Canada. Guelph was founded in 1827 by John Galt as a headquarters for the Canada Company. Many other cities in the region did not see major settlement until the mid-19th century, when agricultural expansion was occurring. During the early-to-mid 19th century, the region was the northern terminus of the Underground Railroad for enslaved African Americans seeking escape from the United States. Thousands of slaves escaped to the region, settling and owning farms in areas such as Essex County, Chatham-Kent, and Queen's Bush. The region's economy was predominantly focused on agriculture until the late 19th century, when industrialization of the region began to occur. Southwestern Ontario emerged as an ideal location for manufacturing due to the presence of cheap and abundant hydroelectric power sourced from the nearby Niagara Falls, and eventually became Canada's manufacturing heartland, which attracted multiple heavy industrial sectors, including automotive manufacturing, chemical production, petrochemical refinement and transport, and food processing. Automotive manufacturing is central to the regional economy, with major active automotive plants being located in Windsor, London, Ingersoll, Woodstock, and Cambridge. The effects of the 2008–2010 automotive industry crisis on Canada included a large number of plants shutting down across the region in the following years. The 2020s saw a widespread resurgence in industrial development, predominantly due to the comparative lack of available land for development and fast-rising property prices in the Golden Horseshoe. Multiple large investments in electric vehicle production were also made in the region in the 2020s, and resulted in the establishment of multiple plants for battery production in Windsor and St. Thomas.

== Demographics ==
=== Population ===
Census Region	Population (2021)	Population (2016)	Population (2011)	Population (2006)	Population (2001)	Area (km^{2})
Waterloo	587,165	535,154	507,096	478,121	438,515	1,368.92
London-Middlesex	500,563	455,526	439,151	422,333	403,185	2,821.00
Windsor-Essex	422,860	398,953	388,782	393,402	374,975	1,662.73
Guelph-Wellington	241,026	222,726	208,360	200,425	187,313	2,665.36
Brant	144,771	134,808	136,035	125,099	118,485	817.66
Sarnia-Lambton	128,154	126,638	126,199	128,204	126,971	2,999.93
Oxford	121,781	110,846	105,719	102,756	99,270	2,036.61
Chatham-Kent	104,316	102,042	104,075	108,589	107,709	2,457.90
Grey	100,905	93,830	92,568	92,411	89,073	4,513.50
St. Thomas-Elgin	94,752	88,978	87,461	85,351	81,553	1,845.41
Stratford-Perth	81,565	76,812	75,112	74,344	73,675	2,177.78
Bruce	73,396	68,147	66,102	65,349	63,892	3,978.76
Norfolk	67,490	64,044	63,175	62,563	60,847	1,607.55
Dufferin	66,257	61,735	56,881	54,436	51,013	1,486.44
Huron	61,366	59,297	59,100	59,325	59,701	3,399.27
Total	2,796,367	2,599,536	2,515,816	2,452,708	2,336,177	36,797.54

=== Census Metropolitan Areas ===
Metropolitan Area	Type	Population			Change	Land Area (km^{2})	Population Density (/km^{2})
Metropolitan Area	Type	(2023) Estimate	(2021)	(2016)	Change	Land Area (km^{2})	Population Density (/km^{2})
Kitchener–Cambridge–Waterloo	CMA	665,188	575,847	523,894	+9.92%	1092.33	527.2
London	CMA	608,343	543,551	494,069	+10.02%	2661.48	204.2
Windsor	CMA	467,973	422,630	398,718	+6.00%	1803.17	234.4
Guelph	CMA	180,476	165,588	151,984	+8.95%	595.08	278.3
Brantford	CMA	167,718	144,162	134,203	+7.42%	1074.00	134.2
Chatham-Kent	CA	110,986	104,316	102,042	+2.23%	2464.52	42.3
Sarnia	CA	106,984	97,592	96,151	+1.50%	1117.20	87.4
Norfolk	CA	73,730	67,490	64,044	+5.38%	1597.68	42.2
Woodstock	CA	51,387	46,705	41,098	+13.64%	56.46	827.2
Stratford	CA	35,421	33,232	31,470	+5.60%	30.02	1,107.0
Owen Sound	CA	34,757	32,712	31,820	+2.80%	624.18	52.4
Centre Wellington	CA	33,811	31,093	28,191	+10.29%	409.41	75.9
Tillsonburg	CA	19,767	18,615	15,872	+17.28%	22.20	838.5
Ingersoll	CA	14,642	13,693	12,757	+7.34%	12.73	1,075.6

=== Administrative Divisions ===
==== Separated Municipalities ====
- City of Brantford
- City of Guelph
- City of London
- City of Owen Sound
- Pelee Township
- City of Sarnia
- Town of St. Marys
- City of St. Thomas
- City of Stratford
- Town of Tillsonburg
- City of Windsor
- City of Woodstock

==== Regional Municipalities ====
- Oxford County
- Waterloo Region

==== Single-Tier Municipalities ====
- County of Brant
- Chatham-Kent
- Norfolk County

==== Counties ====
- Bruce County
- Dufferin County
- Elgin County
- Essex County
- Grey County
- Huron County
- Lambton County
- Middlesex County
- Perth County
- Wellington County

== Geography ==
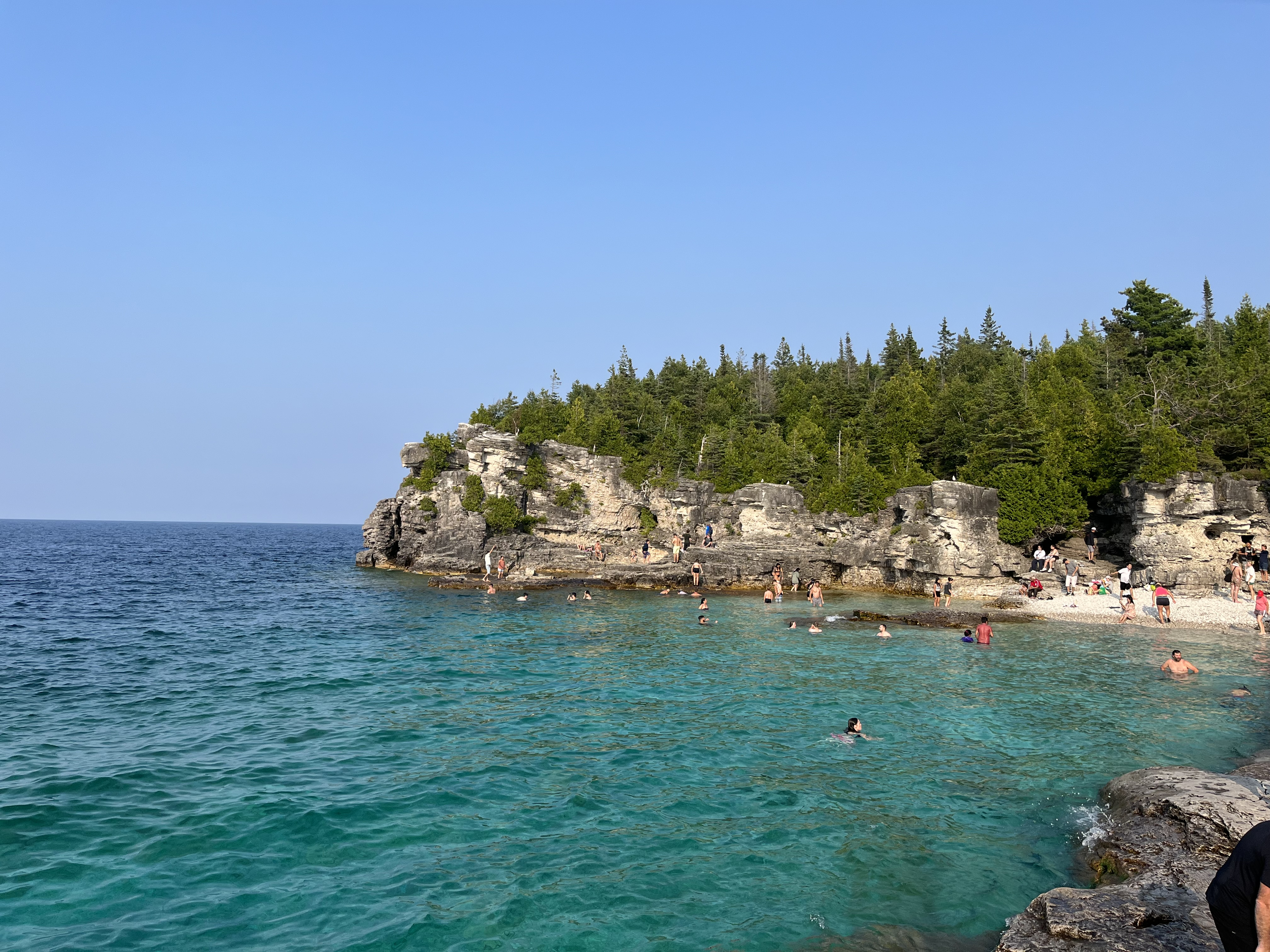
Bruce Peninsula National Park near Tobermory

Southwestern Ontario is located within the Mixedwood Plains Ecozone (as classified by Environment and Climate Change Canada, further subclassified into the Lake Erie Lowland and Manitoulin-Lake Simcoe regions), which largely consists of glacial till and glaciolacustrine sand/silt/clay plains underlain by sedimentary limestone, dolostone, siltstone, sandstone, and shale bedrock, with pockets of evaporite gypsum and salt beds. Bedrock is rarely exposed in the region, with the exception being the Bruce Peninsula. The vast majority of Southwestern Ontario maintains a relatively flat geography with rolling hills, with the exception of areas near the Niagara Escarpment in Bruce and Grey Counties, where exposed limestone cliff faces can be seen along the shores of Georgian Bay. Sandier soils are generally located near Lake Erie, resulting in the creation of a sandy escarpment along the entire north shore, in addition to many sandspit peninsulas, including Point Pelee in Essex County, Pointe aux Pins (Rondeau) in Chatham-Kent, and Long Point in Norfolk County. Pelee Island, the southernmost populated area in Canada, is located south of Point Pelee in Lake Erie.

Southwestern Ontario was originally covered by vast forests prior to agricultural development in the region. Two forest regions are located in Southwestern Ontario; Carolinian forest, located predominantly along Lake Erie and the southern tip of Lake Huron, and Great Lakes-St. Lawrence forest, located around Lake Huron and Georgian Bay. A very small percentage of forest coverage areas remain in the region due to extensive agricultural development and urbanization, but conservation efforts are underway to preserve and/or protect these forests. Three major federally protected areas, Point Pelee National Park, Bruce Peninsula National Park, and Long Point National Wildlife Area, are located in Southwestern Ontario. In 2021, the federal government announced plans to designate a new National Urban Park in Windsor's Ojibway Prairie Complex.

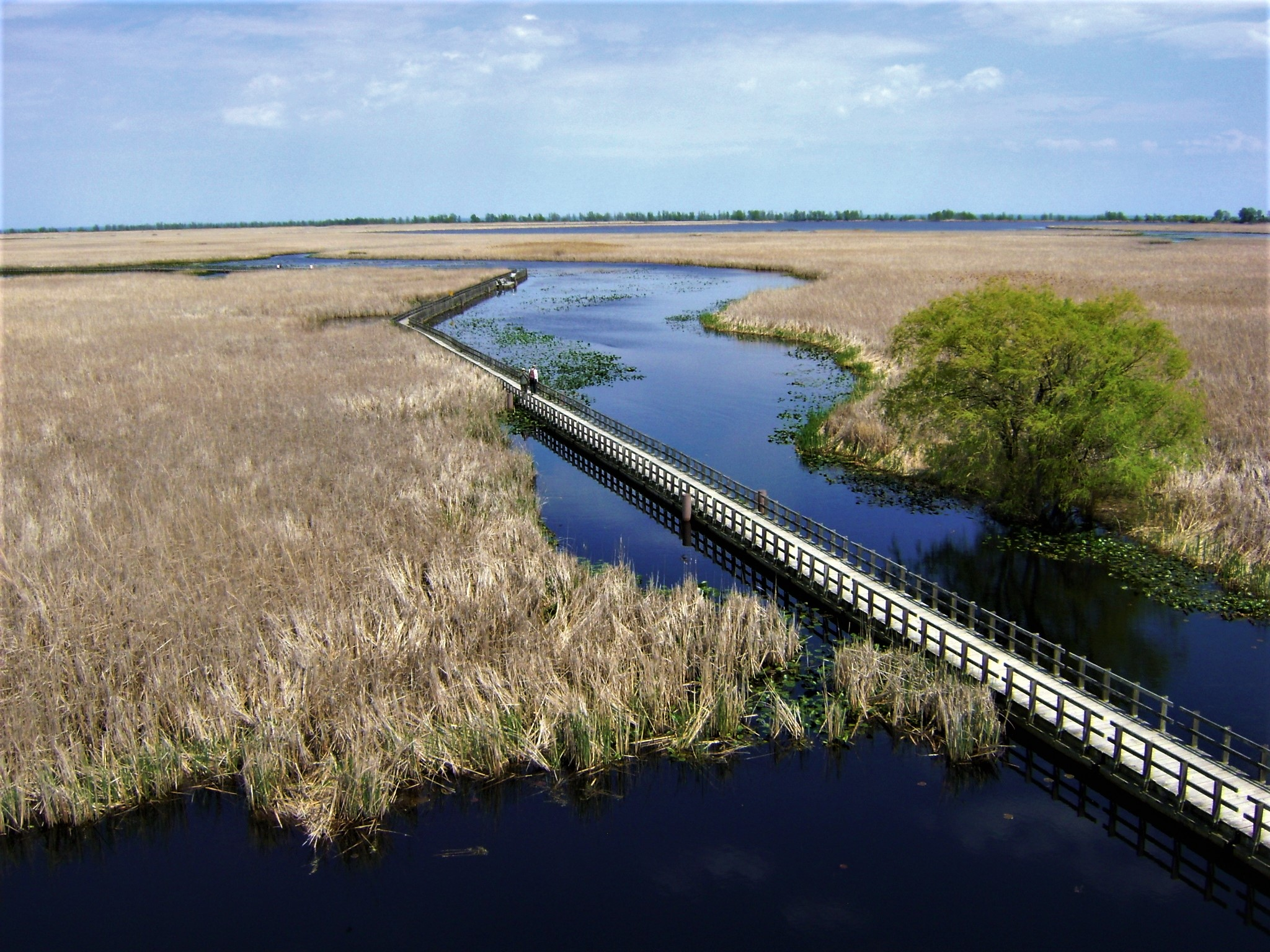
Point Pelee near Leamington

The Carolinian forest zone is Canada's smallest forest zone, but it is home to a very high biodiversity of species due to it being one of the warmest regions in the country. Over 500 rare and/or endangered species are located in this region and is estimated to contain around 25% of Canada's species at risk, including the American badger, Midland painted turtle, Jefferson salamander, monarch butterfly, and southern flying squirrel.

== Climate ==
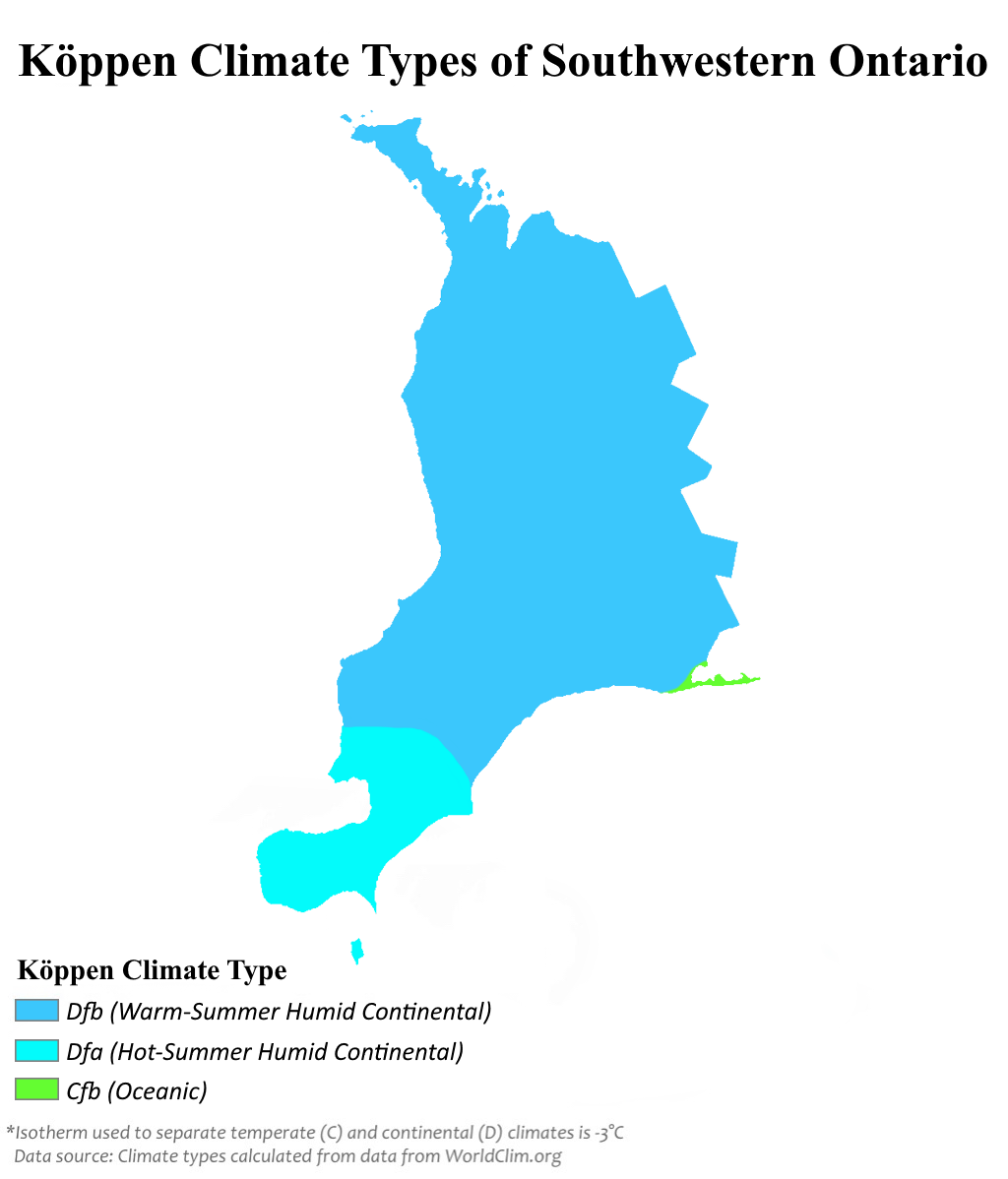
Köppen Climate Map of Southwestern Ontario

Southwestern Ontario's climate is heavily influenced by the proximity of the Great Lakes. Winters in the region are typically milder than the rest of Ontario due to the gradual release of stored heat in the lakes. Despite this, however, portions of the region experience significantly more snow than others due to lake-effect snow caused by eastward winds. A portion of the regional Snowbelt is located in Bruce, Grey, Huron, and Middlesex Counties. In a sharp contrast, Essex County and Chatham-Kent receive less snow than average due to their location further south. Summers are typically hot and humid, with Windsor experiencing the warmest weather in Ontario. Summers are often cooler and less humid on the peninsulas in Lake Erie and Lake Huron. Southwestern Ontario also experiences the highest annual frequency of thunderstorms in Canada, with Windsor, Chatham-Kent, and London experiencing the most days on average with lightning per year. Southwestern Ontario also regularly experiences severe weather events, including tornadoes, due to its proximity to the Great Lakes and warmer-than-average weather during the summer.

Under the Köppen climate classification, the vast majority of Southwestern Ontario has a humid continental climate, with a large portion of the area experiencing a warm-summer Dfb climate, with the exception of Windsor and Chatham-Kent, which experiences a hot-summer Dfa climate. Additionally, a very small area near Long Point experiences a temperate oceanic Cfb climate, due to its location in Lake Erie creating slightly cooler summers and slightly warmer winters than the remainder of the province.

== Economy ==
=== Agriculture ===
Southwestern Ontario has historically been a strong centre for Canadian agricultural production, given the abundance of arable land and warmer climate that provides for a longer growing season than the rest of the country. Most of the land area in the region is used for agriculture. Common crops grown in the region include sweet corn, soybean, winter wheat, and canola. Tobacco was also historically grown in the tobacco belt, centred on the towns of Delhi, Aylmer, and Tillsonburg in Elgin, Oxford, and Norfolk Counties from the 1920s until the early 2000s, when Ontario bought out the tobacco quotas of most farms in the region in 2008 for $300,000,000 CAD. While some tobacco farms still remain, most have switched to alternative crops, including specialty crops like ginseng, hazelnut, and mushrooms. Fruits such as blueberries, strawberries, raspberries, blackberries, gourds, apples, and tomatoes are also grown in the region. Cattle ranching is also another important agricultural industry in Southwestern Ontario, with dairy and beef farming, standardbred horse breeding and training, sheep, poultry, and pig farming being common. The dairy and cheesemaking industry in Southwestern Ontario has been predominantly concentrated in Oxford, Perth, and Wellington Counties, with the region accounting for approximately 56% of Ontario's milk production as of 2020. Sugar bushes for maple syrup production also have a modest presence in the region.

A strong commercial greenhouse sector has also emerged in the region, centred predominantly on the towns of Leamington and Kingsville in Essex County, which boast the largest concentration of commercial greenhouses in North America, made viable due to the presence of sandy soils, low energy costs, and mild winters. Crops such as tomatoes, cucumbers, bell peppers, berries, flowers, and cannabis are grown year-round in these greenhouses, providing a domestic source of out-of-season crops throughout Canada in the winter.

The region is also a centre for wine production. While the majority of wine production in Ontario is currently located in the Niagara Region and Prince Edward County, a wine appellation designated by the Vinters Quality Alliance (VQA), the regulatory system for wine in Ontario and British Columbia, is located on the Lake Erie north shore and Pelee Island in Essex County. Additionally, the VQA recognizes additional emerging wine regions located in Norfolk County, Georgian Bay, and Lake Huron east shore.

=== Energy ===
The energy sector is a major industry in Southwestern Ontario. Energy production in the region is sourced from a mixture of nuclear, hydroelectric, wind, solar, and natural gas sources. The bulk of energy production in the region is produced by the Bruce Nuclear Generating Station in Kincardine. The plant is the second largest nuclear generating station in the world. The plant began operation in 1971 and currently has a generating capacity of 6,550 MW spread across 8 CANDU PHWR reactors. It is anticipated to eventually reach a generating capacity of 7,000 MW through uprates achieved as a result of an ongoing reactor refurbishment program. In 2023, the Ontario government announced plans to expand the plant's generating capacity by an additional 4,800 MW to meet growing energy demands in the province. Additional energy production is supplemented by wind, solar, and hydroelectric power. Large-scale wind turbine fields are located predominantly in Essex County, Chatham-Kent, and Lambton County. Belwood Lake, Conestogo Lake, Fanshawe Lake, Guelph Lake, Pittock Reservoir, and Wildwood Lake are all artificial reservoirs created for local hydroelectric production.

The petrochemical and oil/natural gas industry also has a long history in the region. Oil was initially discovered in Canada in 1858, when the first oil well was advanced in Oil Springs, located in Lambton County. However, oil and petrochemicals did not play a significant role in the regional economy until the large-scale development of oil deposits in Alberta in the 1930s and after World War II, when the first large-scale oil refineries were built in Sarnia. Oil was originally shipped by tankers through the Great Lakes from Superior, Wisconsin until the 1953 expansion of the Enbridge Pipeline System into Sarnia. Today, Sarnia is home to 3 major oil refineries owned by Suncor, Imperial Oil, and Shell Canada. An additional refinery owned by Imperial Oil is located in Nanticoke. These refineries collectively supply much of the province's fuel demand, in addition to providing feedstocks for the chemical industry. Additionally, smaller-scale oil and natural gas development is common in rural Ontario, with small shale oil pools and natural gas deposits being found in local sedimentary bedrock. Shale oil pools are commonly found in Essex County, Chatham-Kent, and Lambton County, where small oil wells can often be seen operating on farms. Natural gas deposits are largely found and exploited along the Lake Erie north shore and under the Lake Erie lake bed.

The chemical industry also has a strong presence in Sarnia, to the point that the area including Sarnia and St. Clair Township is colloquially known as Chemical Valley. The chemical industry has its origins around the same time as the oil industry, during World War II, when tropical sources of natural latex for rubber production were being threatened. The federal government designated Sarnia as the area where synthetic petroleum-based rubbers would be developed for use in the allied war effort. Over time, various chemical companies, including Bayer and Nova Chemicals, have built many facilities in the region for the production of various chemicals, including plastics, paints, lubricants, food additives, cosmetics, rubbers, and other chemicals. The presence of local underground salt beds resulted in a readily available supply of brine and chlorine, which has aided the ease of production of chemicals locally.

=== Manufacturing and Processing ===
Southwestern Ontario's economy and political identity is heavily rooted in the manufacturing industry. Proximity to heavy industry in the United States Rust Belt, predominantly Detroit, and the nearby location of hydroelectric power sources in Niagara Falls provided a foundation for allowing the region to emerge as Canada's manufacturing heartland.

Automotive manufacturing is a major component of the regional manufacturing sector. The Canadian automotive industry first emerged in Windsor and Chatham-Kent in the early 20th century, with the first large-scale automotive plant in Canada being opened in Walkerville in 1904 by the Ford Motor Company of Canada. Early domestic automotive brands in Canada were based in Windsor and Chatham-Kent, including Brooks, Gray-Dort, and Hyslop and Ronald, but were eventually dominated by the American automotive companies such as Chrysler, Ford, General Motors, and Studebaker. Production increases during World War I and World War II allowed the industry to grow significantly, at one point making Canada the second largest automotive manufacturer globally, exporting predominantly to other countries within the British Empire. The Canadian and United States automotive industries were eventually integrated with the signing of the APTA in 1965, which reduced cross-border tariffs and production inefficiencies in Canada, resulting an increase in motor vehicle exports to the United States and domestic parts production, but came at the cost of the decline of domestic automotive brands and consolidation of plants. The signing of NAFTA in 1994 with the United States and Mexico further integrated automotive production across North America, leading to further decline of the automotive sector in Southwestern Ontario. The modern regional automotive industry has multiple large-scale plants in the region, in addition to numerous smaller automotive parts manufacturers/suppliers. The following large automotive plants are currently active or under construction in the region (as of 2024):

- CAMI, General Motors Canada, founded in 1989 in Ingersoll;
- Essex Engine, Ford Motor Company of Canada, founded in 1981 in Windsor;
- Formet, Magna International, founded in 1998 in St. Thomas;
- GDLS-C, General Dynamics Land Systems, founded in 1950 in London;
- NextStar Battery Plant, LG/Stellantis Canada, under construction in Windsor;
- Polycon, Magna International, founded in 1988 in Guelph;
- St. Thomas Battery Plant, Volkswagen Group, under construction in St. Thomas;
- TMMC North, Toyota Canada, founded in 1985 in Cambridge;
- TMMC South, Toyota Canada, founded in 1988 in Woodstock;
- Windsor Assembly, Stellantis Canada, founded in 1928 in Windsor;
- Windsor Engine, Ford Motor Company of Canada, founded in 1923 in Windsor.

Food and beverage processing also has a significant regional presence, owing to the strong agricultural industry. Major food products processed in Southwestern Ontario include refined grains, tomato paste, sauces, condiments, meat products, canned foods, dairy products, parcooked foods, rendered products, and dietary supplements. Major plants include Cargill in London, Maple Leaf in Brantford, London, Guelph, and New Hamburg, Highbury Canco in Leamington, Bonduelle in Tecumseh, Ferrero in Brantford, and Jamieson in Windsor.

Beer and liquor production was a major historical industry in the region. Windsor was an important location for production during Prohibition in the United States, where alcohol was smuggled across the Detroit River. Multiple large breweries and distilleries are located in Southwestern Ontario, in addition to a large number of small craft brewers, distillers, and local wineries. The following are located in the region (as of 2024):

- Crown Royal Distillery, Diageo, to be constructed in St. Clair Township;
- Formosa Springs Brewery, Independent, founded in 1870 in Formosa;
- Hiram Walker & Sons Distillery (Canadian Club), Suntory Global Spirits, founded in 1858 in Windsor;
- Labatt Brewery, AB InBev, founded in 1847 in London;
- Sleeman Brewery, Sapporo Breweries, founded in 1988 in Guelph;
- Waterloo Brewing Company, Carlsberg Group, founded in 1984 in Kitchener.

== Infrastructure ==
=== Roads ===
Ambassador Bridge in Windsor

The vast majority of the primary vehicular traffic network in Southwestern Ontario is served mainly by the controlled-access 400-series highways. Highway 401, the main highway in the network, starts in Windsor at the terminus of the under-construction Gordie Howe International Bridge and runs northeast to Waterloo Region, where it continues northeast through the Golden Horseshoe and Eastern Ontario. Highway 402, another major highway, runs east from the United States border with Michigan in Sarnia to London, where it connects with Highway 401 in southern London. Highway 403 connects with Highway 401 in Woodstock and runs east toward Brantford, where it continues toward Hamilton and the Greater Toronto Area. Additional major provincial highways in the region include Highway 3, Highway 4, Highway 6, Highway 7, Highway 8, Highway 10, and Highway 85.

Additionally, the cities of Windsor and London have municipally owned expressways. E.C. Row Expressway is a fully grade-separated freeway running east-west through Windsor, formerly known as Highway 2. Veteran's Memorial Parkway is a limited-access highway running north-south through London, formerly known as Highway 100. Dougall Avenue is a road in Windsor with a small section of freeway running north from Highway 401, formerly known as Highway 3B. Highbury Avenue is a road that runs from St. Thomas to London, with a small section of freeway running north from Highway 401, formerly known as Highway 126.

Southwestern Ontario also has multiple road connections with the United States. These include the Ambassador Bridge in Windsor, the Bluewater Bridge in Sarnia, and the Detroit-Windsor Tunnel that runs from downtown Detroit to downtown Windsor. A new bridge crossing, the Gordie Howe International Bridge, is currently under construction and slated to open in 2025, and is meant to serve as a direct freeway-to-freeway connection between Highway 401 and E.C. Row in Windsor and Interstate 75 in Detroit.

=== Rail ===
Via Rail operates inter-regional passenger train service on the Quebec City–Windsor Corridor, in Windsor-London-Toronto and Sarnia-London-Toronto configurations, running both on the northern route through Stratford and Kitchener, and the southern route through Woodstock and Brantford. GO Transit also operates inter-regional commuter rail in the region, currently limited to as far west as Waterloo Region on the Kitchener line. In fall 2021, the provincial government announced a pilot program extending GO commuter rail service to London through Stratford and St. Mary's, but this service was discontinued in fall of 2023 due to poor ridership and travel times along the corridor. As of 2024, the provincial government and Waterloo Region are planning for an extension of GO rail service into Cambridge. Only one municipality in Southwestern Ontario, Waterloo Region, currently has a rail-based transit system in operation. This transit system is known as the iON LRT and runs from Waterloo to Kitchener. A southern extension of this rail line into Cambridge is currently being planned.

Freight rail in the region is dominated by CN Rail and CPKC, the two major cross-national Canadian rail companies. Smaller railway companies operating in the region include Essex Terminal Railway, Goderich-Exeter Railway, Ontario Southland Railway, Southern Ontario Railway, and Waterloo Central Railway.

=== Waterways ===
Southwestern Ontario has two major ports, located in Goderich and Windsor, that service cargo ships as part of the Great Lakes/St. Lawrence Seaway system. The Port of Goderich is predominantly used for the export of salt from the Goderich Salt Mine, but also moves grain and calcium chloride. The Port of Windsor is significantly more developed and is the third-busiest Great Lakes port, behind the ports in Hamilton and Thunder Bay. The port of Windsor moves a wider variety of cargo including aggregates, salt, grain, fertilizer, lumber, steel, petroleum, vehicles and machinery. Minor ports are also located in Sarnia, Kingsville, Owen Sound, and Nanticoke.

The Owen Sound Transportation Company currently operates passenger ferry services connecting Leamington to Pelee Island, and Tobermory to Manitoulin Island in Northern Ontario.

=== Airports ===
Southwestern Ontario is home to three major airports – Region of Waterloo International Airport (YKF), London International Airport (YXU), and Windsor International Airport (YQG) – in addition to multiple minor airports in various smaller communities, such as Sarnia Chris Hadfield Airport (YZR) and St. Thomas Municipal Airport (YQS). The three major airports predominantly offer limited international flights (mainly to vacation destinations such as the United States, Mexico, and the Caribbean) on a seasonal basis, in addition to some select all-season routes to other Canadian cities. All airports also offer frequent connecting flights to Toronto Pearson International Airport (YYZ), usually via Air Canada.

== Education ==
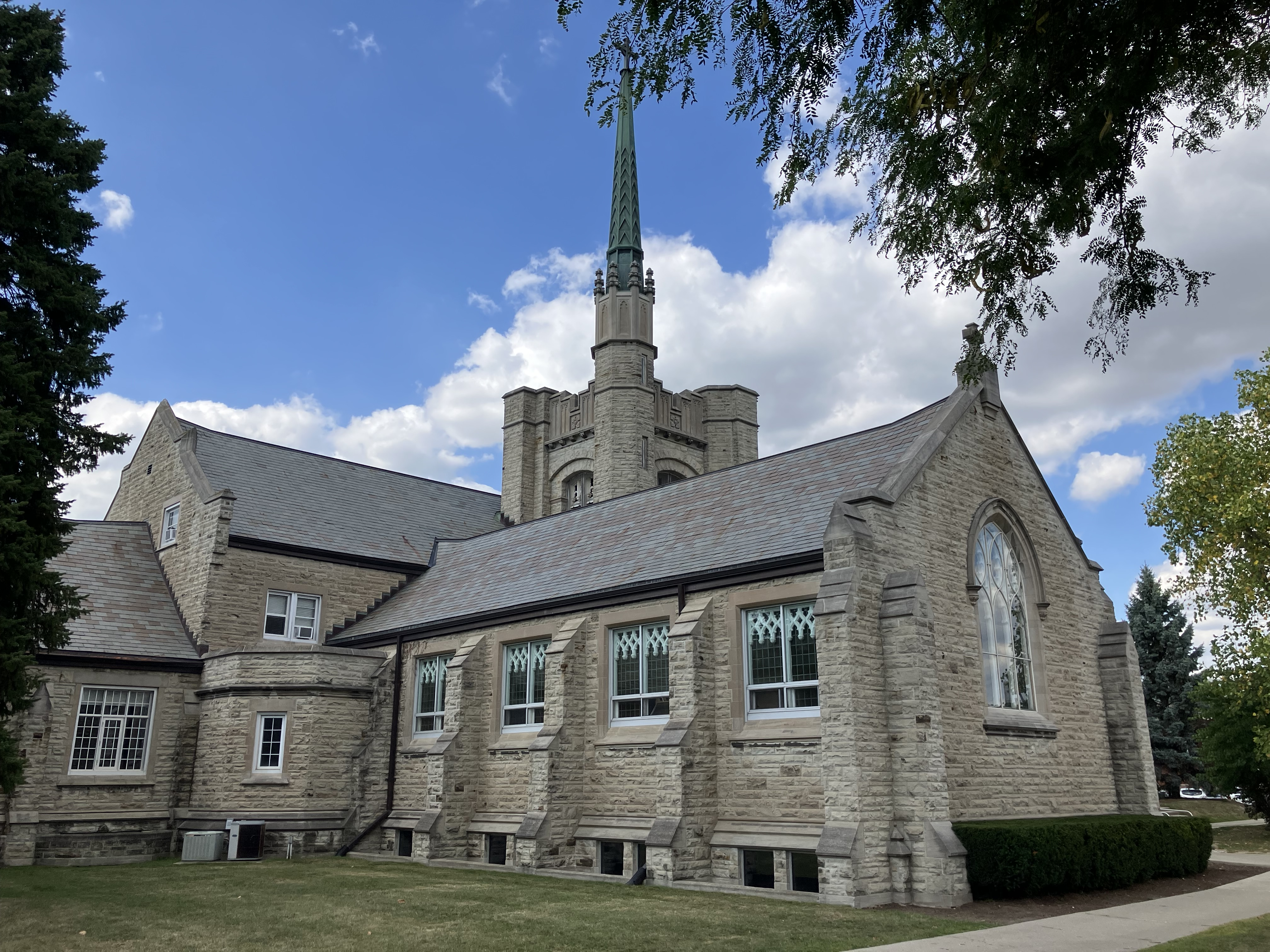
University of Western Ontario in London

Southwestern Ontario has multiple tertiary education institutions in the form of both universities and colleges. Two universities, University of Waterloo and University of Western Ontario, are part of the U15 Group, the association of Canada's dominant research universities.

=== Universities ===
- University of Guelph, founded in 1964 in Guelph;
  - Ontario Agricultural College, founded in 1874 in Guelph and 1922 in Ridgetown;
- University of Waterloo, founded in 1959 in Waterloo;
  - University of Waterloo Stratford, founded in 2009 in Stratford;
- University of Western Ontario, founded in 1878 in London;
  - Brescia University College, founded in 1919 in London;
  - Huron University College, founded in 1863 in London;
  - King's University College, founded in 1954 in London;
- University of Windsor, founded in 1962 in Windsor;
  - Assumption University, founded in 1857 in Windsor;
- Wilfrid Laurier University, founded in 1911 in Waterloo;
  - Laurier Brantford, founded in 1999 in Brantford.

=== Colleges ===
- Conestoga College, founded in 1967 in Kitchener;
  - Additional campuses in Brantford, Cambridge, Guelph, Ingersoll, Stratford, and Waterloo;
- Fanshawe College, founded in 1967 in London;
  - Additional campuses in Clinton, Kincardine, Simcoe, St. Thomas, and Woodstock;
- Lambton College, founded in 1969 in Sarnia;
- St. Clair College, founded in 1966 in Windsor;
  - Additional campus in Chatham-Kent.

== Culture ==
=== Language ===
The accent/dialect in the region, Southwestern Ontario English, is distinct from the rest of Ontario. The region also has a small Francophone population, predominantly located around the Windsor area, owing to the region's historical roots in French colonization.

The region also has a small Indigenous population that speaks Iroquoian and Algonquian languages, primarily spoken by the elders of the Indigenous communities that reside in Southwestern Ontario.

=== Identity and Politics ===
Local identity is heavily rooted in historical industries like agriculture and automotive manufacturing, as well as proximity to the Great Lakes. Sections of Southwestern Ontario are occasionally referred to as Bluewater Country. This is predominantly used to refer to the areas surrounding Lake Huron, but is also used in areas around Lake Erie, to a lesser extent. Multiple locations and roads carry this moniker, including the Municipality of Bluewater (located in Huron County), the Blue Water Bridge and Bluewater Trail System in Sarnia, and Ontario Highway 21 (informally being referred to as the Bluewater Highway due to its route along the shore of Lake Huron).

Southwestern Ontario's political sentiments have largely been influenced by its historical position as Canada's manufacturing heartland. The cities of Windsor, London, and Waterloo Region have historically been political strongholds for both the provincial and federal New Democratic Party, owing to all three having historically been major centres for the manufacturing industry, and subsequently having large proportions of a unionized workforce, which the NDP's policies have historically favoured. Rural segments of the region have historically voted consistently for both the provincial Progressive Conservative party and federal Conservative Party of Canada. In the Great Recession, the manufacturing industry suffered significant decline, particularly in the automotive industry. The decline and subsequent economic stagnation over the following decade resulted in the emergence of populist and protectionist political attitudes in cities like Windsor and London, holding the strongest such attitudes in Canada, ranking amongst Prairie cities like Regina, Saskatoon, Edmonton, and Calgary.

=== Sports ===
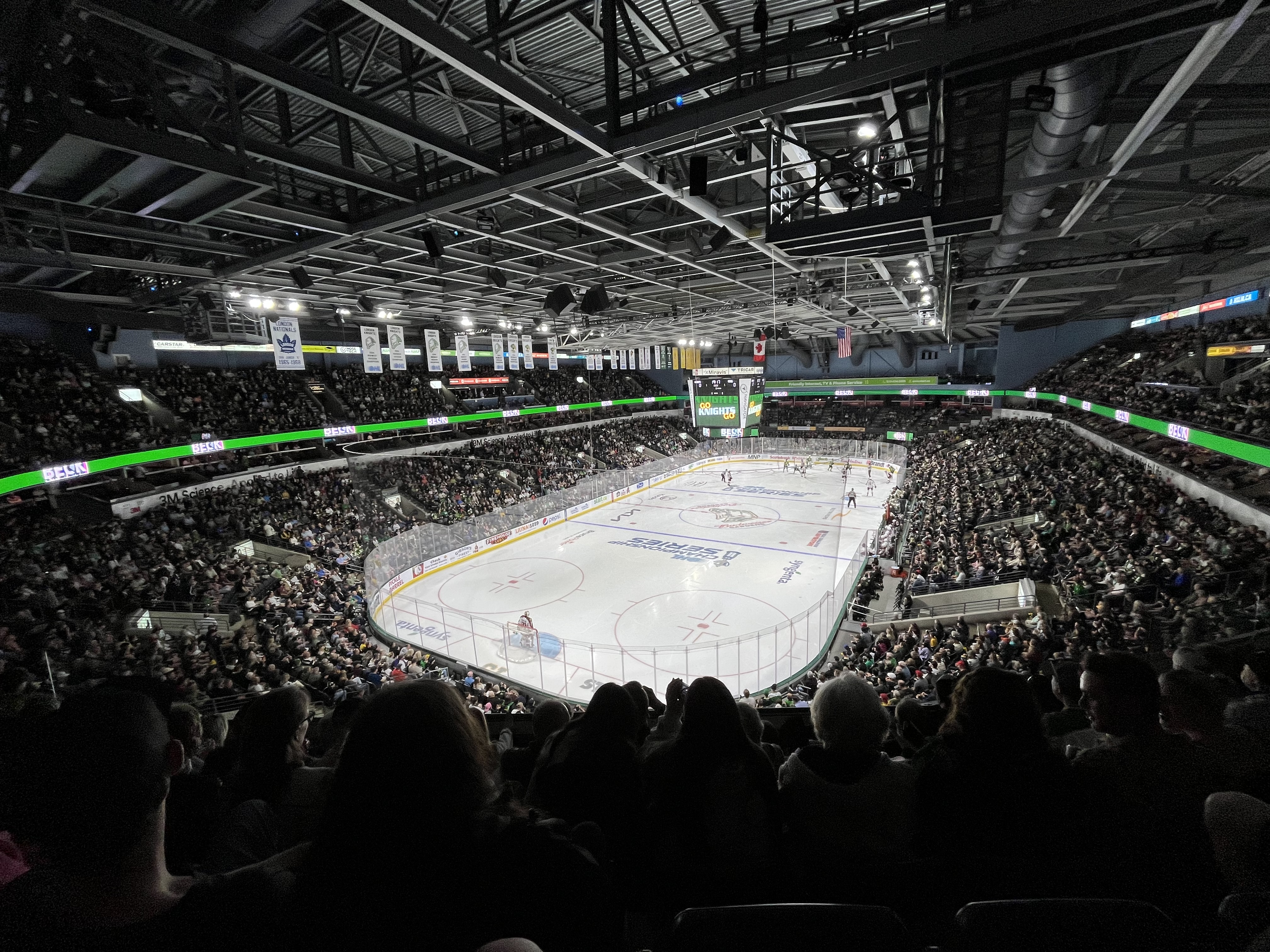
London Knights game at Budweiser Gardens

Southwestern Ontario has never been the home of any professional sports franchises from the contemporary "Big Six" leagues (MLB, NBA, NFL, NHL, MLS, and CFL), with the exception of the NHL's Detroit Cougars (now the Detroit Red Wings) in 1926-1927, when they played at the Border Cities Arena (now Windsor Arena) in Windsor for a singular season while the Detroit Olympia was under construction. Multiple cities historically hosted professional hockey teams from the OPHL in the early 20th century who competed for the Stanley Cup prior to the formation of the NHL in 1917, including the Berlin Dutchmen (who challenged the Montreal Wanderers for the Cup in 1910), Brantford Indians, Galt Professionals (who challenged the Ottawa Senators for the Cup in 1909 and 1911), Guelph Royals, and Waterloo Colts. The region has also historically hosted multiple Canadian football teams that competed for the Grey Cup prior to the formation of the CFL in 1958, including the Brantford Redskins, Kitchener-Waterloo Dutchmen, London Lords, Sarnia Imperials (2-time Grey Cup champions in 1934 and 1936), and Windsor Royals of the Ontario Rugby Football Union.

The combined London-Kitchener TV market, as of 2023, is the fourth largest media market in Canada, and the largest in Canada without representation from a "Big Six" professional team. Various additional professional teams currently and have formerly existed in lower-tier professional leagues in the region, with the only current active professional teams being basketball teams in the Basketball Super League, and semi-professional baseball and soccer teams in the Intercounty Baseball League and League1 Ontario, respectively. Major junior hockey is a major fixture of the sporting landscape in the region, with all major cities hosting OHL teams. Southwestern Ontario teams regularly experience high attendance, with the London Knights and Kitchener Rangers regularly boasting the highest attendance in the league. In the late 2000s, former BlackBerry co-CEO Jim Balsillie made three unsuccessful attempts to purchase and move an NHL franchise to Southern Ontario, with planned destinations being either Kitchener or Hamilton; in 2006 with the Pittsburgh Penguins, in 2007 with the Nashville Predators, and in 2009 with the Arizona Coyotes.

==== Active ====
Club	Sport	League	Level	City	Stadium	Years active
KW Titans	Basketball	BSL	Professional	Kitchener	Kitchener Memorial Auditorium	2016–Present
London Lightning	Basketball	BSL	Professional	London	Canada Life Place	2011–Present
Windsor Express	Basketball	BSL	Professional	Windsor	WFCU Centre	2012–Present
Brantford Red Sox	Baseball	IBL (Ind)	Semi-Pro	Brantford	Arnold Anderson Stadium	1911–Present
Chatham-Kent Barnstormers	Baseball	IBL (Ind)	Semi-Pro	Chatham-Kent	Fergie Jenkins Field	2024–Present
Guelph Royals	Baseball	IBL (Ind)	Semi-Pro	Guelph	David E. Hastings Stadium	1919–Present
Kitchener Panthers	Baseball	IBL (Ind)	Semi-Pro	Kitchener	Jack Couch Park	1919–Present
London Majors	Baseball	IBL (Ind)	Semi-Pro	London	Labatt Park	1925–Present
BVB IA Waterloo	Soccer	L1O	Semi-Pro Minor	Waterloo	RIM Park	2021–Present
FC London	Soccer	L1O	Semi-Pro Minor	London	Tricar Field	2016–Present
Guelph United FC	Soccer	L1O	Semi-Pro Minor	Guelph	Centennial Bowl	2021–Present
Windsor City FC	Soccer	L1O	Semi-Pro Minor	Windsor	St. Clair College SportsPlex	2014–Present
Brantford Bulldogs	Ice Hockey	OHL	Major Junior	Brantford	TD Civic Centre	2023–Present
Guelph Storm	Ice Hockey	OHL	Major Junior	Guelph	Sleeman Centre	1991–Present
Kitchener Rangers	Ice Hockey	OHL	Major Junior	Kitchener	Kitchener Memorial Auditorium	1963–Present
London Knights	Ice Hockey	OHL	Major Junior	London	Canada Life Place	1965–Present
Owen Sound Attack	Ice Hockey	OHL	Major Junior	Owen Sound	Harry Lumley Bayshore CC	1989–Present
Sarnia Sting	Ice Hockey	OHL	Major Junior	Sarnia	Progressive Auto Sales Arena	1994–Present
Windsor Spitfires	Ice Hockey	OHL	Major Junior	Windsor	WFCU Centre	1971–Present

==== Former ====
Club	Sport	League	Level	City	Stadium	Years active
Guelph Nighthawks	Basketball	CEBL	Professional	Guelph	Sleeman Centre	2019 - 2022
Orangeville A's	Basketball	NBLC	Professional	Orangeville	Athlete Institute	2015 - 2017
Detroit Cougars	Ice hockey	NHL	Professional	Windsor	Border Cities Arena	1926 - 1927
Berlin Dutchmen	Ice Hockey	OPHL	Professional	Kitchener	Queen Street Auditorium	1908 - 1911
Brantford Indians	Ice Hockey	OPHL	Professional	Brantford	Unknown	1908 - 1911
Galt Professionals	Ice Hockey	OPHL	Professional	Cambridge	Unknown	1908 - 1909
Guelph Royals	Ice Hockey	OPHL	Professional	Guelph	Unknown	1909 - 1911
Waterloo Colts	Ice Hockey	OPHL	Professional	Waterloo	Unknown	1910 - 1911
London Tigers	Baseball	EL (AA)	Pro-Minor	London	Labatt Park	1989 - 1993
London Monarchs	Baseball	CBL (Ind)	Pro-Minor	London	Labatt Park	2003
London Rippers	Baseball	FL (Ind)	Pro-Minor	London	Labatt Park	2012
London Werewolves	Baseball	FL (Ind)	Pro-Minor	London	Labatt Park	1999 - 2001
Guelph Maple Leafs	Baseball	IA (Ind)	Pro-Minor	Guelph	Unknown	1877
London Tecumsehs	Baseball	IA (Ind)	Pro-Minor	London	Labatt Park	1877 - 1878
Sarnia Golden Bears	Football	AFC	Pro-Minor	Sarnia	Athletic Park	1961
Kitchener Flying Dutchmen	Ice Hockey	CPHL	Pro-Minor	Kitchener	Unknown	1928 - 1929
Kitchener Millionaires	Ice Hockey	CPHL	Pro-Minor	Kitchener	Unknown	1927 - 1928
London Panthers	Ice Hockey	CPHL	Pro-Minor	London	London Arena	1926 - 1929
Stratford Nationals	Ice Hockey	CPHL	Pro-Minor	Stratford	Unknown	1926 - 1928
Windsor Bulldogs	Ice Hockey	CPHL	Pro-Minor	Windsor	Border Cities Arena	1926 - 1929
Chatham Maroons	Ice Hockey	IHL	Pro-Minor	Chatham-Kent	Chatham Memorial Arena	1949 - 1952, 1963-1964
Windsor Gotfredsons	Ice Hockey	IHL	Pro-Minor	Windsor	Windsor Arena	1945 - 1950
Windsor Spitfires	Ice Hockey	IHL	Pro-Minor	Windsor	Windsor Arena	1945 - 1950
Brantford Smoke	Ice Hockey	UHL	Pro-Minor	Brantford	Brantford Civic Centre	1991 - 1998
Chatham Wheels	Ice Hockey	UHL	Pro-Minor	Chatham-Kent	Chatham Memorial Arena	1992 - 1994
London Wildcats	Ice Hockey	UHL	Pro-Minor	London	London Ice House	1994 - 1995
St. Thomas Wildcats	Ice Hockey	UHL	Pro-Minor	St. Thomas	St. Thomas Memorial Centre	1991 - 1994
Brantford Alexanders	Ice Hockey	OHL	Major Junior	Brantford	Brantford Civic Centre	1978 - 1984
Guelph Platers	Ice Hockey	OHL	Major Junior	Guelph	Guelph Memorial Gardens	1968 - 1989
Brantford Redskins	Football	ORFU	Pro-Am	Brantford	Unknown	1952 - 1953
Kitchener-Waterloo Dutchmen	Football	ORFU	Pro-Am	Waterloo	Seagram Stadium	1953 - 1959
London Lords	Football	ORFU	Pro-Am	London	Labatt Park	1956 - 1974
Sarnia Imperials	Football	ORFU	Pro-Am	Sarnia	Athletic Park	1928 - 1955
Windsor Royals	Football	ORFU	Pro-Am	Windsor	Windsor Stadium	1945 - 1952
