= Mapleton, Ontario =

Mapleton
- Township (lower-tier)
- Township of Mapleton
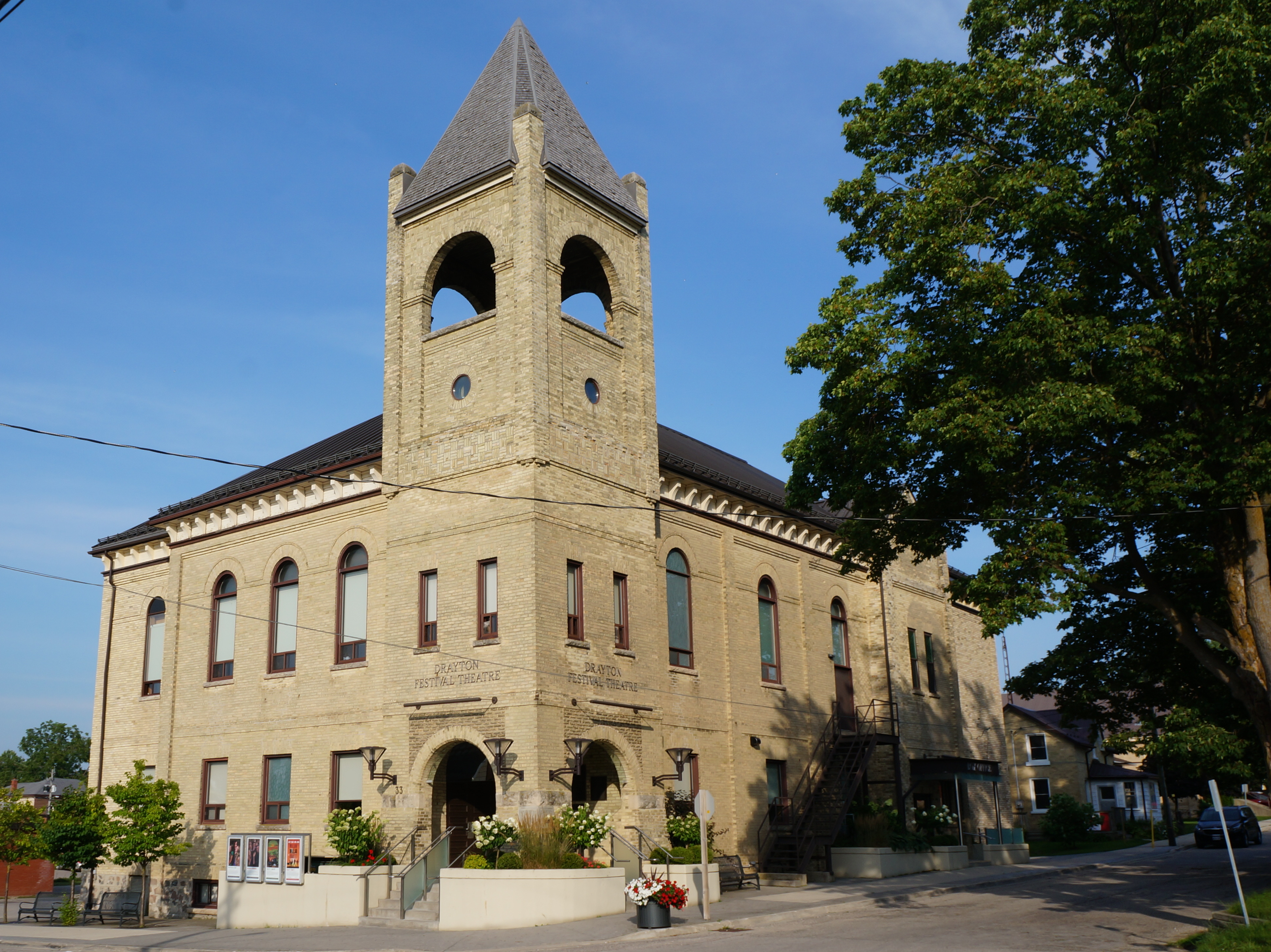
- The Drayton Festival Theatre

- Location within Wellington County Location within Southern Ontario
- Coordinates: 43.75°N 80.6667°W
- Country: Canada
- Province: Ontario
- County: Wellington
- Established: 1999

Government
  - Type: Township
  - Mayor: Gregg Davidson
  - Governing Body: Mapleton Township Council
  - Federal riding: Perth Wellington
  - Prov. riding: Perth—Wellington

Area
  - Land: 534.87 km^{2} (206.51 sq mi)

Population (2016)
  - Total: 10,527
  - Density: 19.7/km^{2} (51/sq mi)
- Time zone: UTC-5 (EST)
  - Summer (DST): UTC-4 (EDT)
- Postal Code FSA: N0B
- Area codes: 519, 226, 548
- Website: www.mapleton.ca

Mapleton is a rural township in the Canadian province of Ontario, located within Wellington County.

== Communities ==
The largest and central community in Mapleton is the village of Drayton, which contains the township offices and has the largest retail presence.

The township also contains the smaller communities of Alma, Bosworth, Dobbenville, Glen Allan, Goldstone, Hollen, Lebanon, Moorefield, Parker, Quarindale, Riverbank, Rothsay, Spruce Green, Stirton, Wyandot, and Yatton.

== History ==
The township was formed by the amalgamation of the townships of Maryborough and Peel, and the village of Drayton on January 1, 1999.

== Demographics ==
Mapleton, Ontario Historical populations
| Year | Pop. | ±% |
|---|---|---|
| 1996 | 8,827 | — |
| 2001 | 9,303 | +5.4% |
| 2006 | 9,851 | +5.9% |
| 2011 | 9,989 | +1.4% |
| 2016 | 10,527 | +5.4% |

In the 2021 Census of Population conducted by Statistics Canada, Mapleton had a population of 10,839 living in 3,245 of its 3,633 total private dwellings, a change of 3% from its 2016 population of 10,527. With a land area of 535.56 km^{2} (206.78 sq mi), it had a population density of 20.2/km^{2} (52.4/sq mi) in 2021.

== Education ==
Mapleton is served by four public schools, administered by the Upper Grand District School Board. These are:

- Alma Public School
- Centre Peel Public School
- Drayton Heights Public School
- Maryborough Public School (Moorefield)

Secondary education is served by Norwell District Secondary School in Palmerston, in the adjacent township of Minto.

Mapleton is also served by one independent school:

- Community Christian School (Drayton), which is connected to the Ontario Alliance of Christian Schools

== Recreation ==
Conestogo Lake is home to a reservoir and conservation area. It is part of the Conestogo River watershed.

== See also ==
- List of townships in Ontario
