= Conestoga Lake =

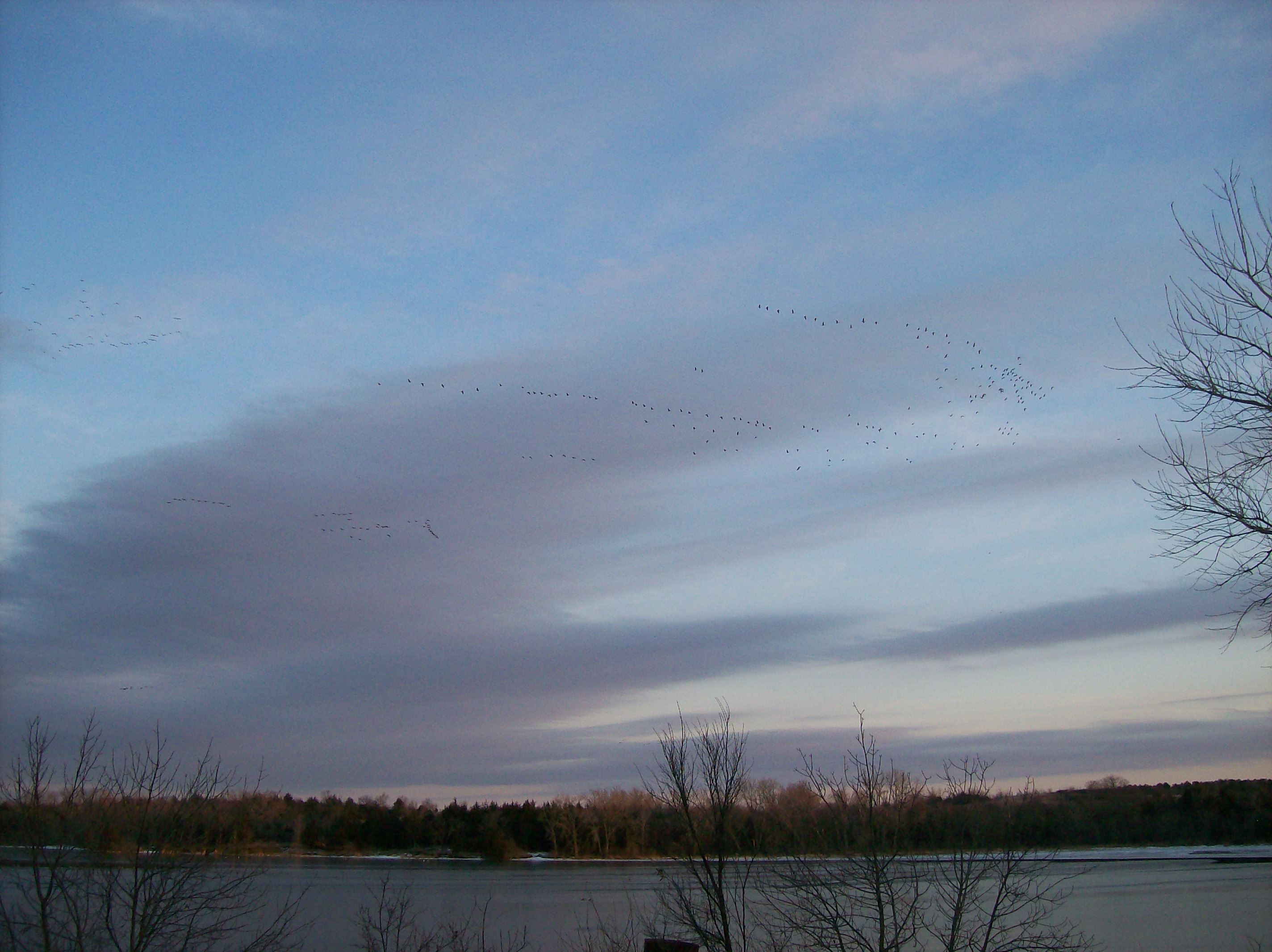

- Location within Nebraska Location within the United States
- Location: Lancaster County, Nebraska
- Coordinates: 40°45′58″N 96°51′07″W
- Type: lake
- Basin countries: United States
- Surface elevation: 1,230 ft (375 m)

Conestoga Lake is a lake in Lancaster County, Nebraska, United States of America. It is owned by the U.S. Army Corps of Engineers, with a recreation area.
