= Conestogo Lake =

Lake in Wellington County, Ontario, Canada

- Conestogo Dam
- View from Conestogo Dam

- Location within Ontario
- Location: Ontario, Canada
- Coordinates: 43.687°N 80.735°W
- Type: flood control dam/reservoir
- Built: May 30, 1955 - October 15, 1958
- Construction engineer: C.A. Pitts Company
- First flooded: October 15, 1958

Conestogo Lake is an artificial lake on the Conestogo River (a tributary of the Grand River) in Wellington County in Southwestern Ontario, Canada. It is a reservoir with a flood control dam, and covers approximately 628 ha (1,550 acres). 398 cottage lots are located around the lake.

Fishing is permitted in the lake and the catch may include: perch, walleye, crappie, and smallmouth bass. A recreational fishing licence is required for legal fishing in Ontario.

== History ==
Flood control measures had been first used in the 1890s and also by the construction of the Shand Dam that gave form to Lake Belwood in 1942, but a long-term solution was still needed.

The dam was proposed by the then Grand River Conservation Commission in 1952, but construction did not begin until 1955 due to local disputes, Hurricane Hazel and lack of government funding during the Korean War. Construction of the dam was completed in late 1957 (roadwork and other items not relating to the dam control were completed afterwards) and officially opened in October 1958.

== Impact ==
Besides lessened flooding the dam resulted in a number of roads cut off. Two roads were rerouted:

- Wellington County Road 11 was rerouted around dam north of Wellington County Road 45 with former section south of damn now called Sailing Club Road
- Leslie Lane is rerouted via Wellington County Road 3, 5 and 10 over two sections

A few roads are now severed and some with sections with different names:

- Side Road 15 is severed with no rerouting or renaming
- Selinger Road west of dam and 4 Line east of the dam
- Concession Road 6 west of dam and 6 Line east of dam

Land was also lost with areas now underwater. While impact was minimal to Quarindale and Kumpfville, parts of the former village of Hollen are now underwater.

== Conestogo Lake Conservation Area ==
Conestogo Lake Conservation Area is a recreation area located at the south end of Conestogo Lake near the community of Glen Allan and managed by the Grand River Conservation Authority. Most activities involve use of the lake and during non-winter months. The conservation area hosts snowmobile trails during the winter months when snow is present. Access to the facility is made via Wellington County Road 11.
