= Lake Belwood =

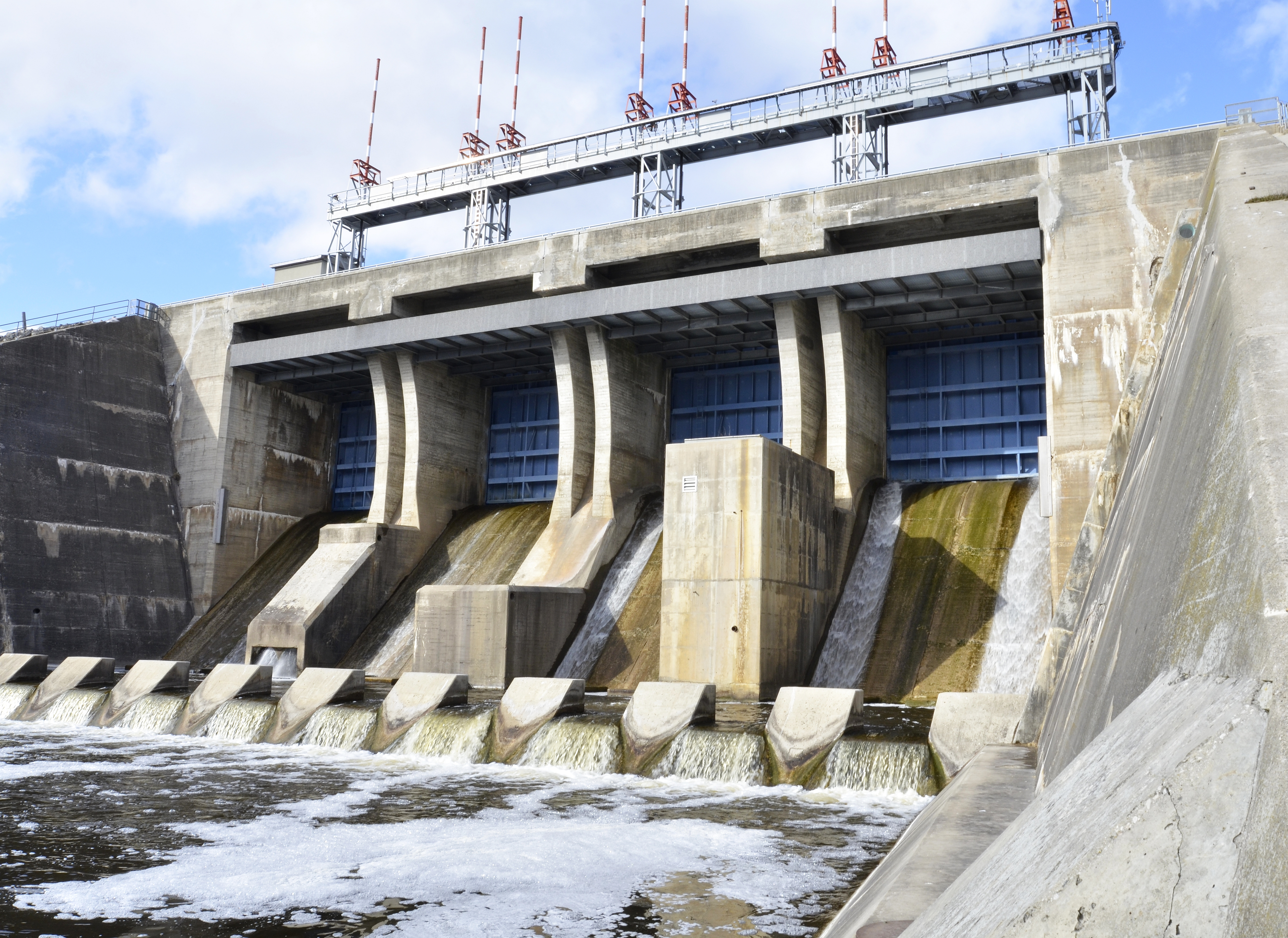
- Shand Dam

- Location of Lake Belwood in Ontario.
- Location: Dufferin & Wellington, Ontario, Canada
- Coordinates: 43°46′05″N 80°20′08″W
- Type: Lake
- River sources: Grand River
- Max. length: 12 km (7.5 mi)
- Max. width: 2 km (1.2 mi)
- Surface elevation: 422 m (1,385 ft)
- Settlements: East Garafraxa, Centre Wellington

Lake Belwood is a reservoir in East Garafraxa, Dufferin County and Centre Wellington, Wellington County, Ontario, Canada. It is on the Grand River, whose waters were impounded in 1942 by the erection of the Shand Dam for flood control and the generation of hydroelectricity. The community of Belwood is on the north shore of the lake, and only the easternmost portion of the lake is in Dufferin County. Belwood Lake Conservation Area, operated by the Grand River Conservation Authority, surrounds almost the whole lake.
