= Conestogo River =

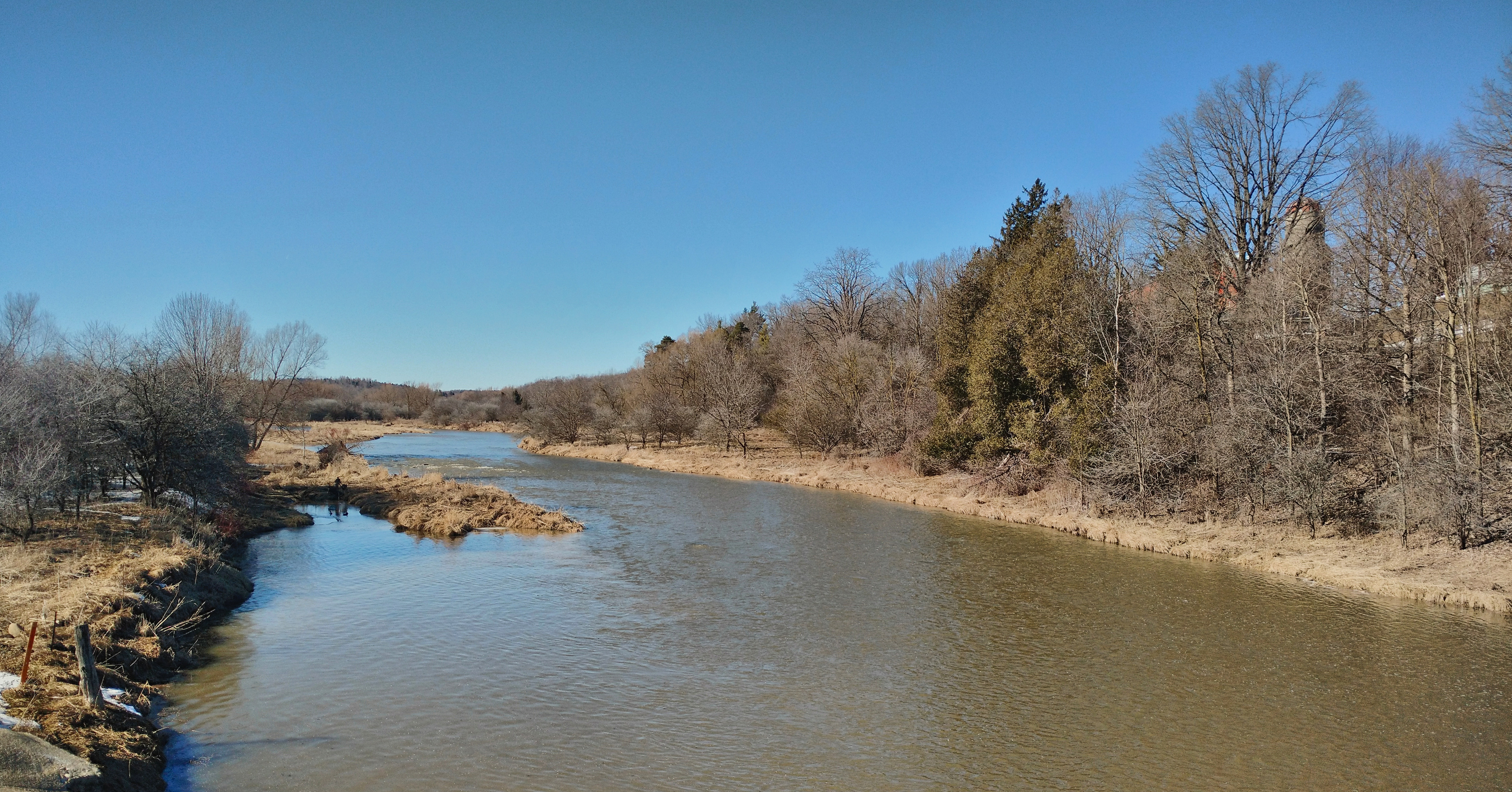
- Conestogo River in Mapleton, Ontario

Location
- Country: Canada
- Province: Ontario
- Region: Southwestern Ontario
- Regional municipality/County: Waterloo Region; Wellington County

Physical characteristics
- Source: field
  - location: Wellington North, Wellington County
  - coordinates: 43°57′28″N 80°30′15″W
  - elevation: 492 m (1,614 ft)
- Mouth: Grand River
  - location: Woolwich, Waterloo Region
  - elevation: 311 m (1,020 ft)

Basin features
- River system: Lake Erie Basin

The Conestogo River is a river in Waterloo Region and Wellington County in Southwestern Ontario, Canada. The river was named by Mennonite settlers after the Conestoga River in Pennsylvania. In the 1800s there were several different spellings of the name of the river and of the nearby settlement of Conestogo, Ontario but the name ending in "o" became official.

It is in the Lake Erie Basin and joins the Grand River as a right tributary at the community of Conestogo.

A dam built on the river for flood control formed Conestogo Lake, which covers an area of about 23 square kilometres (8.9 mi^{2}). A conservation area operated by the Grand River Conservation Authority is located on this lake.

== Natural history ==
Fish species in the river include brown trout, pike, smallmouth bass, perch, walleye and carp.

== See also ==
- List of rivers of Ontario

== Sources ==
- Map 2 (PDF) (Map). 1 : 700,000. Official road map of Ontario. Ministry of Transportation of Ontario. 2010-01-01.
- Restructured municipalities - Ontario map #6 (Map). Restructuring Maps of Ontario. Ontario Ministry of Municipal Affairs and Housing. 2006. Archived from the original on 2021-02-24.
- The Grand River Watershed (PDF) (Map). 1 : 225,000. Grand River Conservation Authority. 2004. Archived from the original (PDF) on 2015-09-24.
