= Wellington County, Ontario =

County in Ontario, Canada

Wellington County
- County (upper-tier)
- County of Wellington
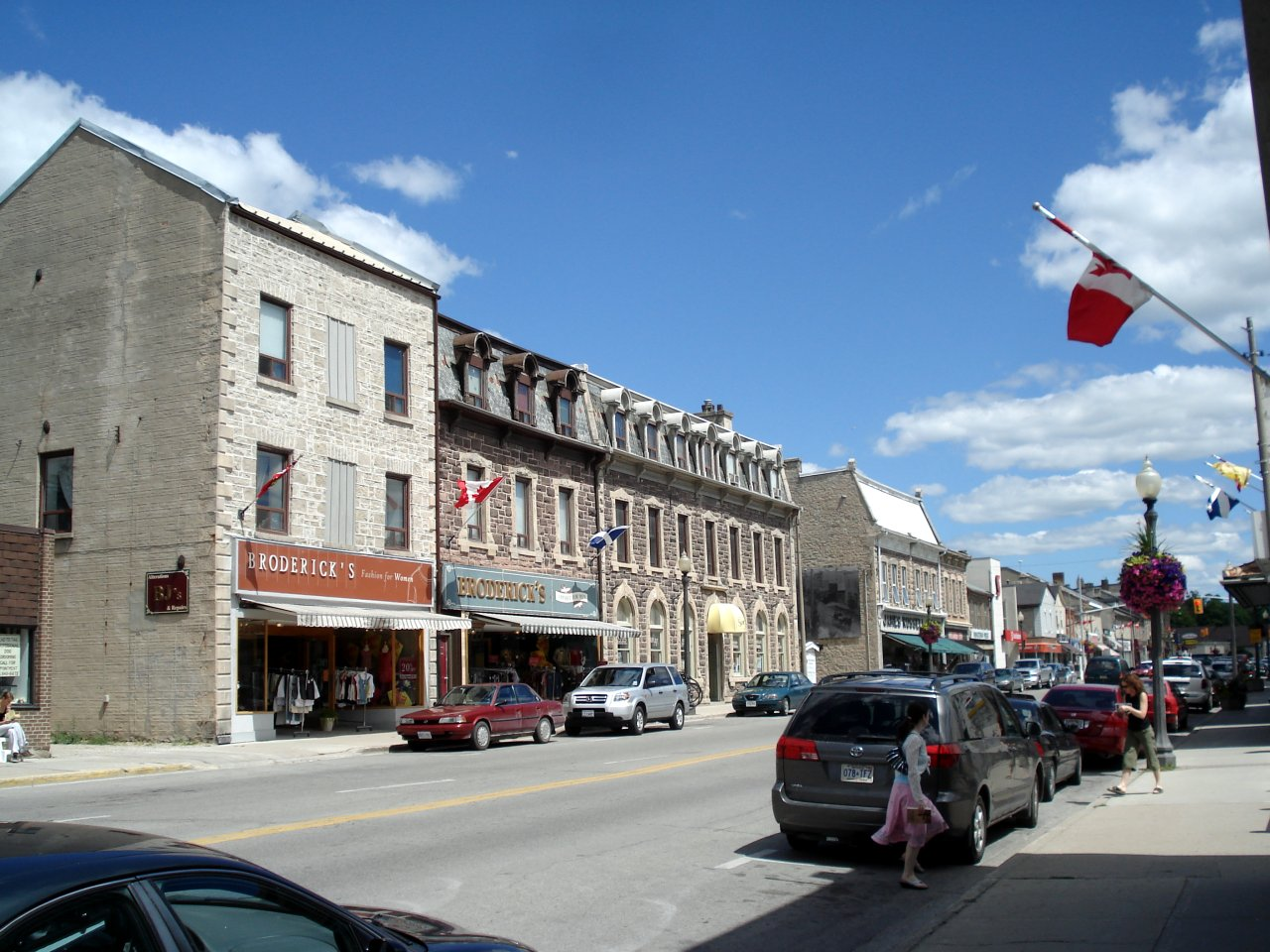
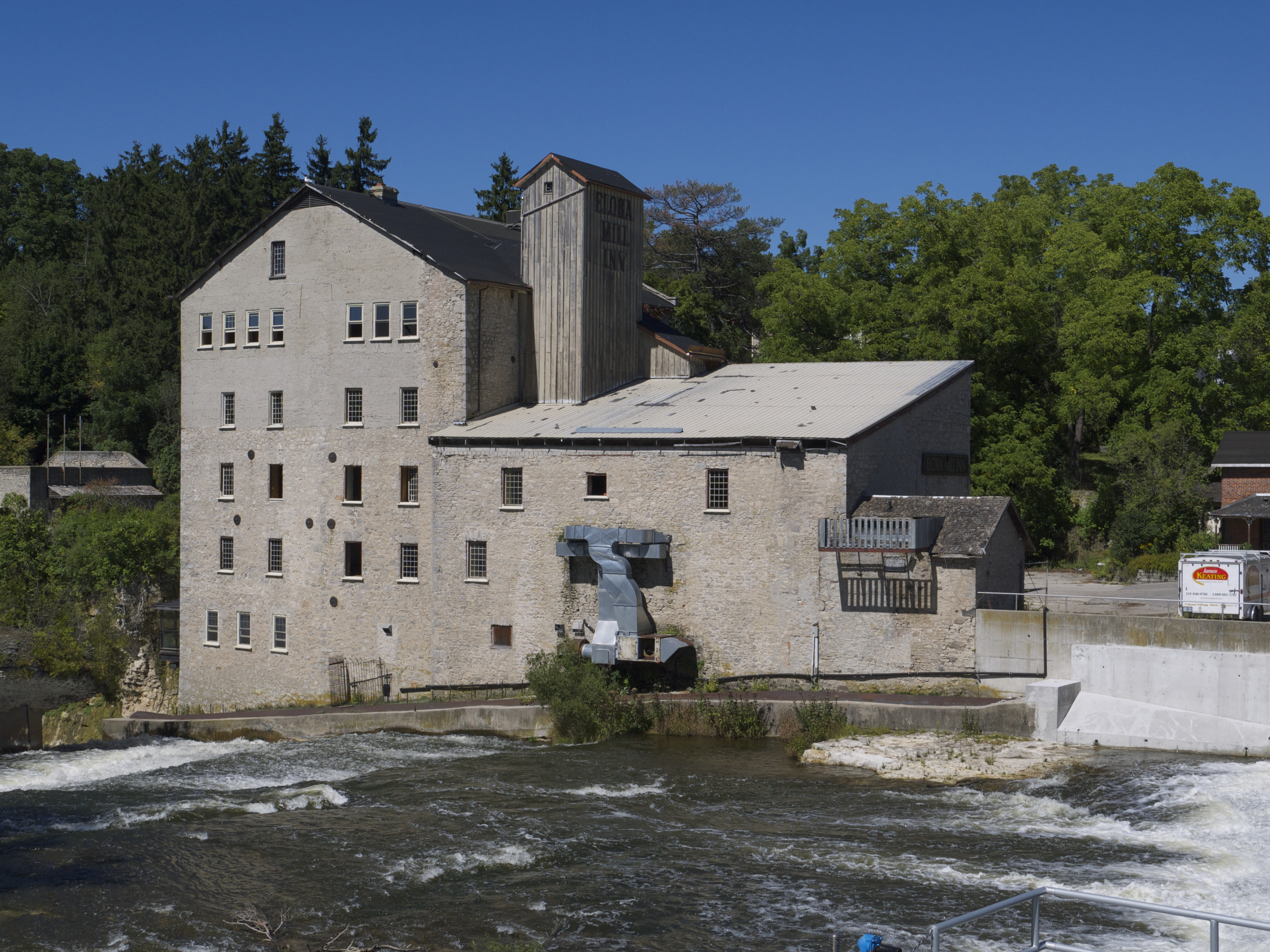
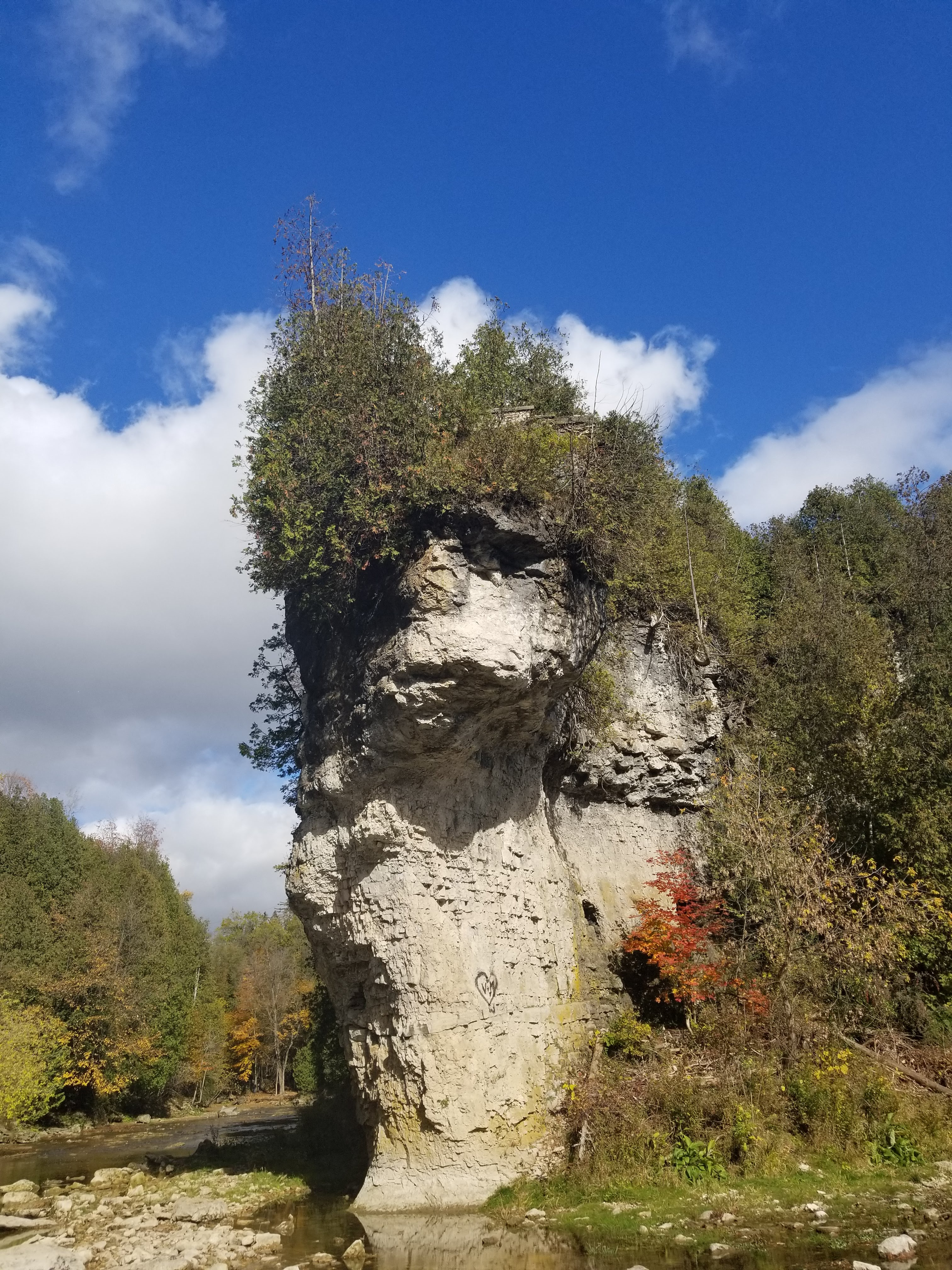
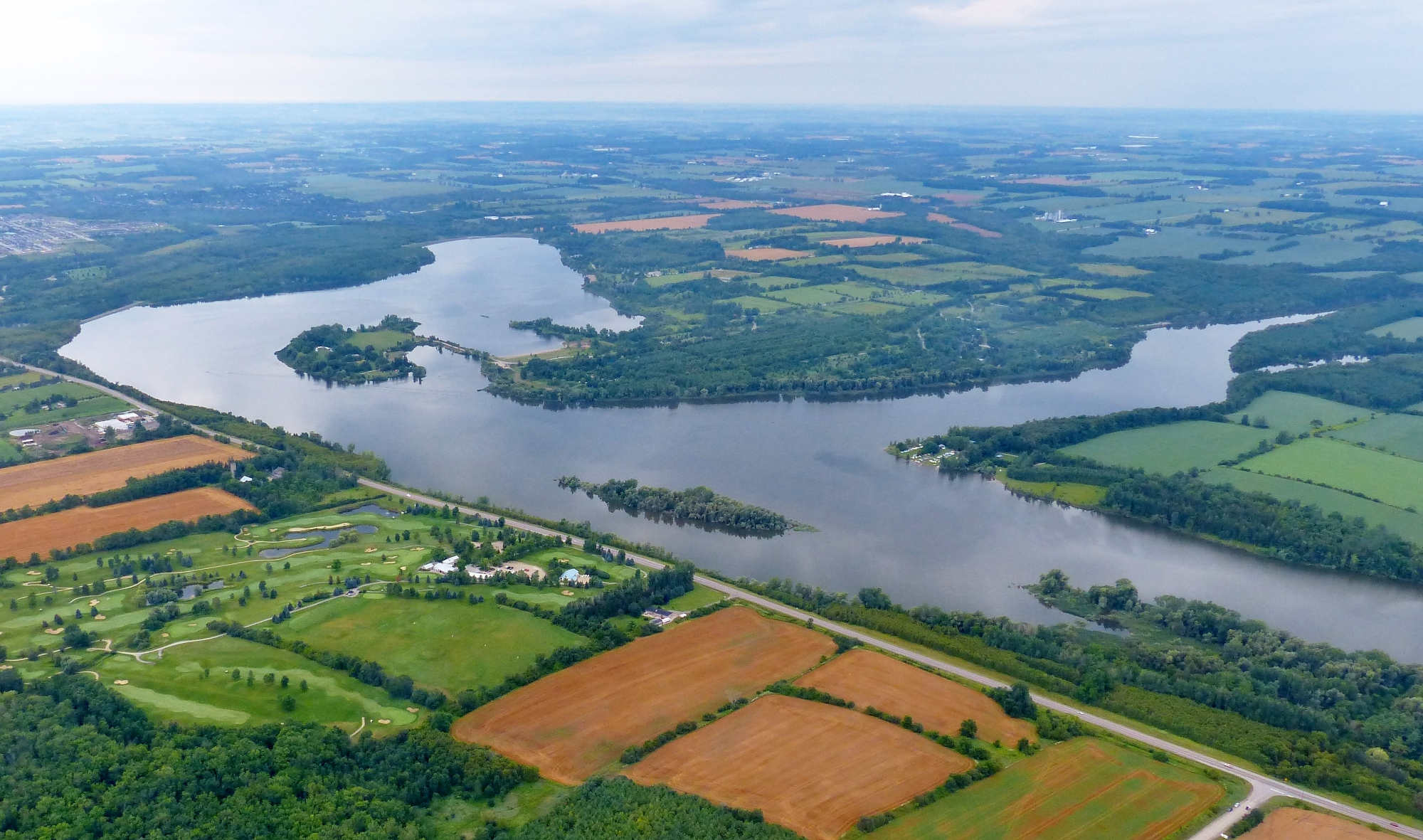
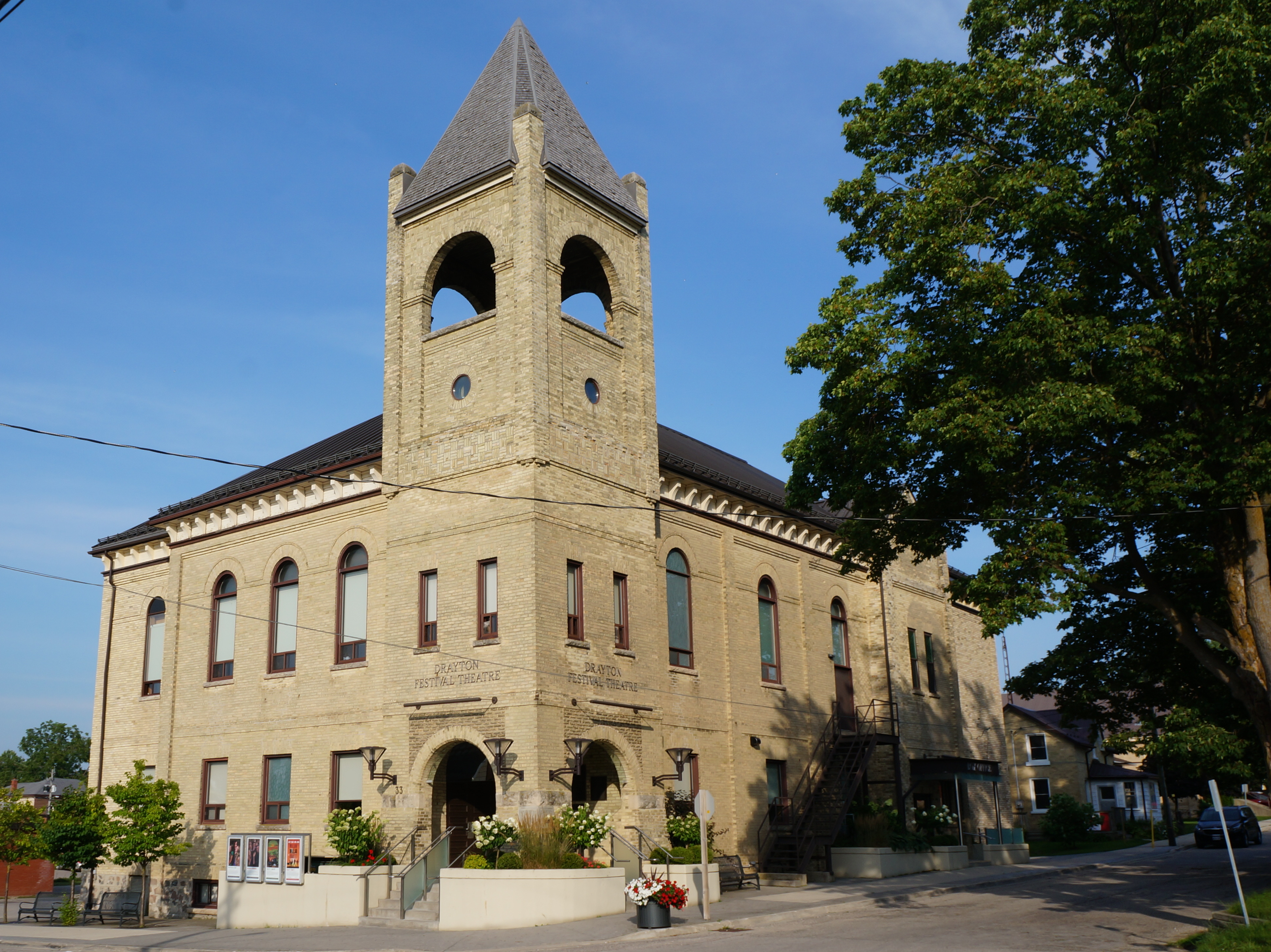
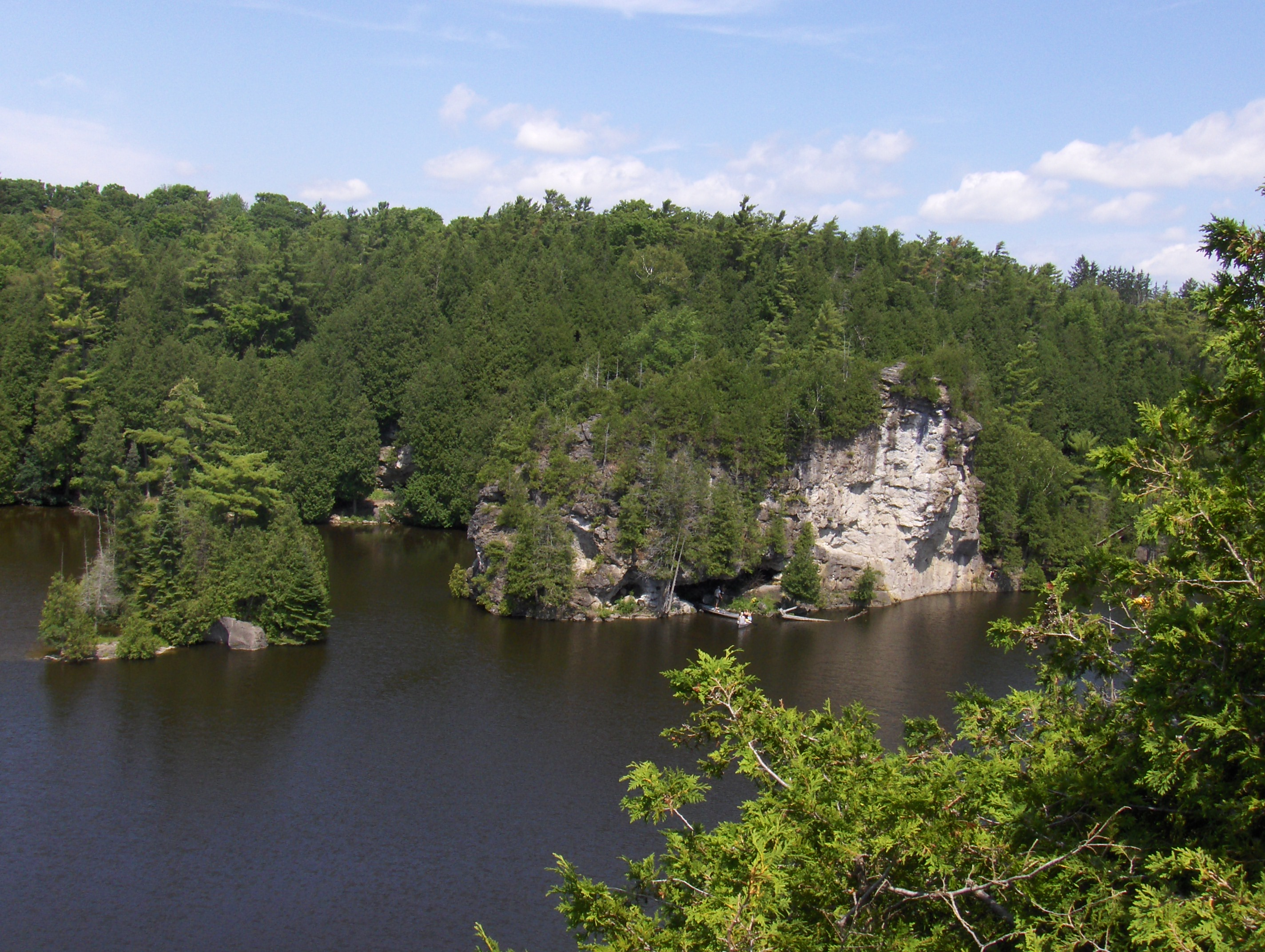
- Clockwise from top left: St. Andrew St., Fergus, the Elora Mill, Guelph Lake, Rockwood Conservation Area, Drayton Festival Theatre, Elora Gorge

- Seal
- Motto: Vision, Valour

- Map showing Wellington County's location in Ontario
- Coordinates: 43°45′N 80°24′W
- Country: Canada
- Province: Ontario
- Established: 1852
- County seat: Guelph (independent)
- Municipalities: List: Township of Centre Wellington; Town of Erin; Township of Guelph/Eramosa; Township of Puslinch; Township of Mapleton; Town of Minto; Township of Wellington North

Government
  - Warden: Kelly Linton

Area
  - Land: 2,577.93 km^{2} (995.34 sq mi)
  - Census div.: 2,665.36 km^{2} (1,029.10 sq mi)
- Land area excludes Guelph

Population (2021)
  - Total: 97,286
  - Density: 37.7/km^{2} (98/sq mi)
  - Census div.: 241,026
  - Census div. density: 90.4/km^{2} (234/sq mi)
- Total excludes Guelph
- Time zone: UTC-5 (EST)
  - Summer (DST): UTC-4 (EDT)
- Website: www.wellington.ca

Wellington County is a county and census division located in Southwestern Ontario, Canada, and is part of the Greater Golden Horseshoe. The county consists of two towns and five townships, with its seat in the City of Guelph, which is geographically within the county but administered independently. According to the 2021 census, the population of the census division was 241,026.

Many of the residents in the southern part of the county commute to urban areas such as Guelph, Kitchener, Waterloo, Brampton, Mississauga, Toronto and Hamilton for employment. The northern part of the county (comprising Minto, Mapleton, and Wellington North townships) is made up of mainly rural farming communities, except for a few larger towns such as Mount Forest and Arthur.

In 2018, the warden of the county was Kelly Linton, the mayor of Centre Wellington, and there were 14 councillors. Police services are provided by the Ontario Provincial Police. Schools are operated by the Upper Grand District School Board and by the Wellington Catholic District School Board.

== Subdivisions ==
The county is made up of seven lower-tier municipalities (in order of population):

- Centre Wellington, Township of (population centres: Fergus, Elora)
- Guelph/Eramosa, Township of (population centre: Rockwood)
- Wellington North, Township of (population centres: Mount Forest, Arthur)
- Erin, Town of (population centres: Erin, Hillsburgh)
- Mapleton, Township of (population centre: Drayton)
- Minto, Town of (population centres: Palmerston, Harriston)
- Puslinch, Township of

The City of Guelph, although part of the Wellington census division, is a single-tier city; the municipality is independent of the county. The primary economy outside of the city consists of agriculture and aggregate mining. The county is a major supplier of sand and gravel for the western part of the Greater Toronto Area.

== History ==
=== Evolution ===
In 1837, by an Act of the Legislative Assembly of Upper Canada, the District of Wellington was formed and a court house and jail in the town of Guelph were authorized. The District was named after England's Duke of Wellington and its territory formed the County of Waterloo for electoral purposes. The limestone county courthouse and jail in the castellated style was built in 1842-44 and was subsequently expanded.

In 1849, Wellington District was abolished, and Waterloo County remained for municipal and judicial purposes. The territory of the Bruce Peninsula became part of Waterloo in 1849, but was later withdrawn and transferred to Bruce County in 1851.

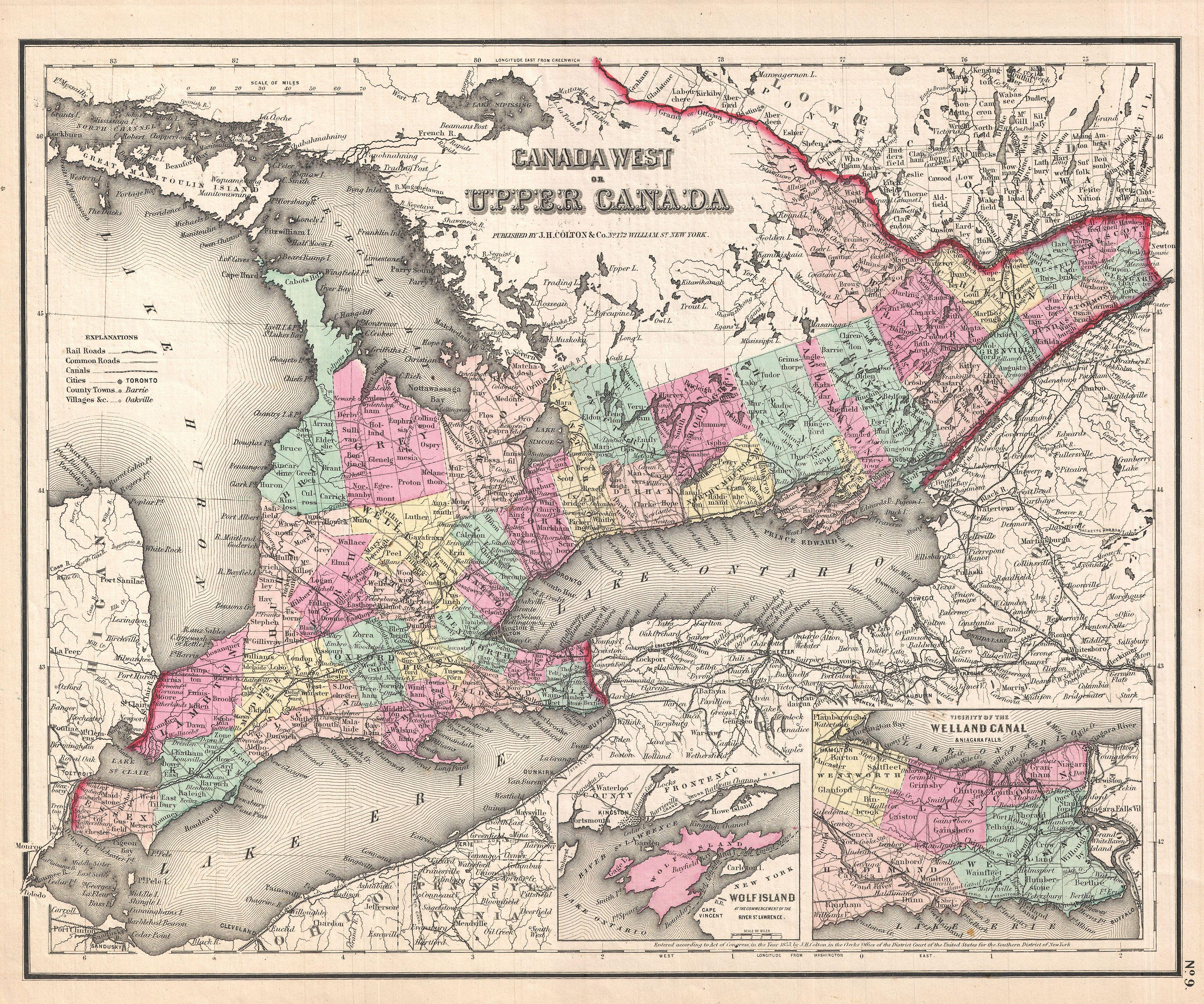
Wellington County is marked in light yellow in 1857.

In January 1852, Waterloo County became the United Counties of Wellington, Waterloo and Grey. The new county of Waterloo was withdrawn in January 1853, and the remainder was renamed the United Counties of Wellington and Grey.

In January 1854, the United Counties was dissolved, and Wellington and Grey were separate counties for all purposes.

Guelph was incorporated as a City in 1879 and withdrawn from the county. Amaranth, East Garafraxa, East Luther and Orangeville were transferred to Dufferin County during the period 1874–1882.

The Wellington County Jail (in Late Gothic Revival Style) and the Governor's Residence (in Georgian style) at 74 Woolwich Street were built in 1911; they were designated by the city for "historic and architectural value" and as a National Historic Site in 1983. The property is now an Ontario Court of Justice.

=== Historic townships ===
By 1881, the county had settled into its present form, with the following townships and related towns and villages:

Historic townships of Wellington County (1881)
Township	Area	Description	Community centres
Arthur	64,494 acres (261 km^{2})	Opened in 1835, it was named after Arthur Wellesley, 1st Duke of Wellington	Arthur, Kenilworth and Mount Forest
Eramosa	44,482 acres (180 km^{2})	Opened in 1821. The name is an attempt to render in English the Indigenous word "un-ne-mo-sa", which means dog	Eden Mills and Rockwood
Erin	70,557 acres (286 km^{2})	Opened in 1820	Erin, Hillsburgh, Mimosa
West Garafraxa	46,950 acres (190 km^{2})	Opened in 1821. Name is believed to be from an Indigenous word meaning "the place of panthers."	Fergus (only partially in the township), Reading, Metz and Garafraxa
Guelph Township	35,543 acres (144 km^{2})	Opened on April 23, 1827, by John Galt on behalf of the Canada Company	
West Luther	49,830 acres (202 km^{2})	Opened in 1821 and named after the leader of the Reformation in Germany, Martin Luther. It was said that the surveyor, a Roman Catholic, having been embarrassed by the endless swamps he had encountered declared that this was "the meanest piece of country he had seen" and named it Luther for that reason	Monck, Stonywood, Damascus and Arthur
Maryborough	56,728 acres (230 km^{2})	Opened in 1840 and named after a brother of the Duke of Wellington, Baron Maryborough	Drayton, Moorefield and Rothsay
Minto	69,927 acres (283 km^{2})	Opened in 1840 and named after the Earl of Minto, a famous pro-consul in India. Settled mainly between 1861 and 1875	Harriston, Palmerston, and Clifford
Nichol	26,996 acres (109 km^{2})	One of the townships leased by Joseph Brant under power of attorney for the First Nations of the Grand River region. The Township was granted to Hon. Thomas Clark on a lease of 999 years for 3,564, but the contract was modified by the Crown. The Township was opened for settlement in 1822. Named in honour of Col Robert Nichol of Norfolk who distinguished himself in the War of 1812 and latter in political battles	Elora, Fergus, Salem and Barnet
Peel	74,525 acres (302 km^{2})	Opened in 1835 and named in honour of Sir Robert Peel. Settled mainly between 1850 and 1853	Drayton, Glenallan, Goldstone and Alma
Pilkington	28,983 acres (117 km^{2})	Named in honour of Lieutenant Robert Pilkington (later General Pilkington) who accompanied John Graves Simcoe to Upper Canada. Pilkington acquired 20,000 acres (80 km^{2}) of land	Elora in Nichol Township
Puslinch	58,291 acres (236 km^{2})	Named after Puslinch, Devon, Lady Colborne's home before her marriage	Aberfoyle

In 1999, seven new municipalities (Townships) were created within Wellington County through amalgamation.

=== From "poorhouse" to museum ===
In 1877, the county opened the Wellington County House of Industry and Refuge, or Poorhouse as it was called, on Wellington Road 18 between Fergus and Elora. Over the years, approximately 1500 deserving poor, including those who were destitute, old and infirm or suffering from disabilities were housed here. The sixty bed house for inmates was surrounded by a 30-acre "industrial" farm with a barn for livestock that produced some of the food for the 70 residents and the staff and also provided work for them. Others worked in the House itself. According to a 2009 report by the Toronto Star, "pauperism was considered a moral failing that could be erased through order and hard work". A hospital was added in 1892. A nearby cemetery has 271 plots for those who died. In 1947 the House was converted into the Wellington County Home for the Aged and in 1975 the building reopened as the Wellington County Museum and Archives.

A historic plaque was erected at the museum, indicating that the "government-supported poorhouse" was "the shelter of last resort for the homeless and destitute, who traded spartan accommodations for domestic or agricultural labour".

== Demographics ==
As a census division in the 2021 Census of Population conducted by Statistics Canada, Wellington County had a population of 241,026 living in 91,822 of its 97,287 total private dwellings, a change of 8.2% from its 2016 population of 222,726. With a land area of 2,665.36 km^{2} (1,029.10 sq mi), it had a population density of 90.4/km^{2} (234.2/sq mi) in 2021.

Historical census populations – Wellington County, Ontario

Year	Pop.	±%
1921	54,160	—
1931	58,164	+7.4%
1941	59,453	+2.2%
1951	66,930	+12.6%
1956	75,691	+13.1%
1961	84,702	+11.9%

Year	Pop.	±%
1966	94,177	+11.2%
1971	108,581	+15.3%
1976	123,736	+14.0%
1981	129,432	+4.6%
1986	139,447	+7.7%
1991	159,609	+14.5%

Year	Pop.	±%
1996	171,395	+7.4%
2001	187,313	+9.3%
2006	200,425	+7.0%
2011	208,360	+4.0%
2016	222,726	+6.9%
2021	241,026	+8.2%

Includes City of Guelph. Population counts are not adjusted for boundary changes.
Source: Statistics Canada

Panethnic groups in Wellington County (2001−2021)
Panethnic group	2021		2016		2011		2006		2001	
Panethnic group	Pop.	%	Pop.	%	Pop.	%	Pop.	%	Pop.	%
European (Note: Statistic includes all persons that did not make up part of a visible minority or an indigenous identity.)	192,185	80.77%	188,570	85.94%	181,980	88.39%	179,595	90.41%	169,820	91.87%
South Asian	12,760	5.36%	7,355	3.35%	5,370	2.61%	4,145	2.09%	3,125	1.69%
Southeast Asian (Note: Statistic includes total responses of "Filipino" and "Southeast Asian" under visible minority section on census.)	7,790	3.27%	5,835	2.66%	5,110	2.48%	3,745	1.89%	2,615	1.41%
African	6,870	2.89%	3,280	1.49%	1,975	0.96%	1,790	0.9%	1,965	1.06%
East Asian (Note: Statistic includes total responses of "Chinese", "Korean", and "Japanese" under visible minority section on census.)	5,500	2.31%	5,250	2.39%	4,175	2.03%	3,760	1.89%	3,565	1.93%
Middle Eastern (Note: Statistic includes total responses of "West Asian" and "Arab" under visible minority section on census.)	3,895	1.64%	2,535	1.16%	1,650	0.8%	1,605	0.81%	975	0.53%
Indigenous	3,810	1.6%	3,385	1.54%	3,200	1.55%	1,815	0.91%	1,260	0.68%
Latin American	2,525	1.06%	1,525	0.7%	1,370	0.67%	1,235	0.62%	795	0.43%
Other (Note: Statistic includes total responses of "Visible minority, n.i.e." and "Multiple visible minorities" under visible minority section on census.)	2,575	1.08%	1,690	0.77%	1,055	0.51%	940	0.47%	735	0.4%
Total responses	237,930	98.72%	219,415	98.51%	205,885	98.81%	198,635	99.11%	184,840	98.68%
Total population	241,026	100%	222,726	100%	208,360	100%	200,425	100%	187,313	100%
Note: Totals greater than 100% due to multiple origin responses

== Community involvement and awards ==
In October 2008, the County of Wellington was named one of Canada's Top 100 Employers by Mediacorp Canada Inc. and featured in Maclean's newsmagazine. Later that month, the county was recognized as one of Waterloo Area's Top Employers and featured in the Guelph Mercury newspaper.

In 2014, the County of Wellington received Best Health and Wellness Strategy at the Canadian HR Awards. The award recognizes excellence in the area of corporate health and well-being.

In 2013 (Gold), and again in 2014 (Silver), the County of Wellington received Canada's Safest Employer in the Public Sector Award. Canada's Safest Employers Awards recognize organizations from all across Canada with outstanding accomplishments in promoting the health and safety of their workers.

In 2014 (Gold), and again in 2016 (Silver), the County of Wellington received Canada's Psychological Safety Award. Canada's Safest Employer Awards introduced a new Psychological Safety Award in 2014 to recognize organizations that are committed to employee mental health and are working towards implementing the National Standard for Psychological Health and Safety in the Workplace.

The County of Wellington in Ontario, Canada, embarked on the BR+E journey beginning in 2013. Two years later, the county has reaped significant rewards with the candle on the cake represented by two BREI awards at the BREI Annual Conference in 2014.

The County of Wellington proudly received the 2015 Employer of Distinction Award at an Award Ceremony presented by the Guelph and District Human Resources Professionals Association in Guelph.

In early 2018, Alma resident Jim deBock received the Ontario Medal for Good Citizenship for his extensive volunteer work.

== Travel Region ==
Wellington County is part of the Hills of Headwaters Tourism Association and Central Counties of Ontario, two tourism related associations.

In addition to the Museum, attractions in the County recommended by users of the Tripadvisor web site include Elora Rapids, Elora Gorge Conservation Area, the Fergus Grand Theatre and the Elora Cataract Railway. Popular parks with lakes for day use include Rockwood Conservation Area and Belwood Lake.

== See also ==
- List of counties in Ontario
- List of secondary schools in Ontario
