= Grand River Conservation Authority =

Conservation authority in Ontario, Canada

Coordinates: 43°22′33.24″N 80°17′8.57″W

- Founded: 1932
- Purpose: Manage the water and other natural resources in the Grand River Watershed
- Location: Cambridge, Ontario, Canada
- Region served: Grand River Watershed
- Website: www.grandriver.ca

The Grand River Conservation Authority (GRCA) is a conservation authority in Ontario, Canada. It operates under the Conservation Authorities Act of Ontario. It is a corporate body, through which municipalities, landowners and other organizations work cooperatively to manage the Grand River watershed and natural resources within it.

Created in 1932 as the Grand River Conservation Commission, the GRCA is the oldest water management agency in Canada. It is one of 36 conservation authorities in Ontario and is a member of Conservation Ontario.

The GRCA also owns and manages many conservation areas, parks and trails within the watershed.

== History ==
The Grand River provided transportation, water supply, and waterpower attracting settlement to the valley in the 19th century. The combined deforestation and urban settlement aggravated flood and drought conditions.

A main part of the Grand River's course flows through the Carolinian life zone, which contains a southern type of forest that is found only in this area of Canada. A wide variety of rare plants and animals are found here.

The water quality in the river started to deteriorate to the point where it was a major public health concern. To deal with these problems, a group of eight municipalities came together in 1934 to form the Grand River Conservation Commission. The Commission completed the Shand Dam, the first multi-purpose dam in Canada, in 1942. It was built for flood control and the low flow augmentation to improve water quality during the dry summer months. The Commission also started planting trees to re-vegetate the landscape along the river.

Prior to World War II, renewable natural resources were exploited to encourage economic and industrial expansion and growth. As a result of public concern over the state of the environment in Ontario, the Province passed the Conservation Authorities Act, 1946. The Act was based on three main principles:

- Initiative for the establishment and support of a conservation authority must come from the local people (all watershed municipalities).
- The best unit for dealing with renewable resource conservation is the watershed.
- If initiative and support were shown locally, the Ontario government would provide technical advice and financial assistance in the form of grants.

The Grand River Conservation Authority is a corporate body established to enable municipalities to jointly undertake water and natural resource management on a watershed basis - for the benefit of all.

The broad goal of all conservation authorities in Ontario is specified in Section 20 of the Conservation Authorities Act:

The objects of the Authority are to establish and undertake in the area over which it has jurisdiction, a program designed to further the conservation, restoration, development and management of natural resources other than gas, oil, coal and minerals. (RSO 1990, c. 27)

Under the terms of the Act, the Grand Valley Conservation Authority was formed in 1948. This allowed all watershed municipalities to work collaboratively to address a broad range of resource management issues.

The practicality of two conservation organizations operating in the same watershed was closely scrutinized in the 1960s. To avoid potential conflict over roles and responsibilities and to eliminate duplication of programs the Grand River Conservation Authority was established in 1966 through the amalgamation of the Grand River Conservation Commission and the Grand Valley Conservation Authority.

== Conservation areas ==
Active

- Belwood Lake Conservation Area
- Brant Conservation Area
- Byng Island Conservation Area
- Conestogo Lake Conservation Area
- Elora Gorge Conservation Area
- Elora Quarry Conservation Area
- Guelph Lake Conservation Area
- Laurel Creek Conservation Area
- Luther Marsh Wildlife Management Area
- Pinehurst Lake Conservation Area
- Rockwood Conservation Area
- Shade's Mills Conservation Area
- Bannister Lake Conservation Area
- Chesny Conservation Area
- Chilligo Conservation Area
- Dumfries Conservation Area
- Puslinch Tract Conservation Area
- Starkey Hill Conservation Area
- Taquanyah Conservation Area
- Wrigley Lake Conservation Area

== Other ==
- The Arboretum, University of Guelph
- Avon Trail
- Blue Springs Creek Wetland Complex
- Cambridge-Paris Trail
- City of Cambridge Trails
- Chicopee Ski Club, Kitchener
- Chilligo Restoration Area, Cambridge
- Conestogo Dam
- Damascus Dam
- Dickson Wilderness Area
- Dunnville Marshes
- Elora Cataract Trail
- Emerald Lake Recreation Area
- Eramosa River Valley
- F.W.R. Dickson Wilderness Area
- Gordon Memorial Pathway, Brantford
- Grand River Forest
- Grand River Scenic Parkway
- Grand Valley
- Guelph Dam
- Guelph Lake Rotary Forest
- Guelph Radial Line Trail
- Heritage Park
- Homer Watson Park
- Homer Watson Scenic Lookout
- Hamilton-Brantford Trail
- Idylwild Park, Cambridge
- City of Kitchener Trails
- Kortright Waterfowl Park
- Laurel Creek Nature Centre
- Laurel Dam
- Lover's Leap Scenic Lookout
- Luther Dam
- Luther Marsh Wildlife Management Area
- Mill Creek - Puslinch
- Mohawk Island National Wildlife Area
- Murray Overlook
- Paris-Brantford Trail
- St. George Camp Ground
- Shand Dam
- Spottiswood Lake
- Sudden Tract
- Taquanyah Nature Centre
- Walter Bean Trail
- City of Waterloo Trails
- Woolwich Dam
- Town of Woolwich Trails
