= Laurel Creek Conservation Area =

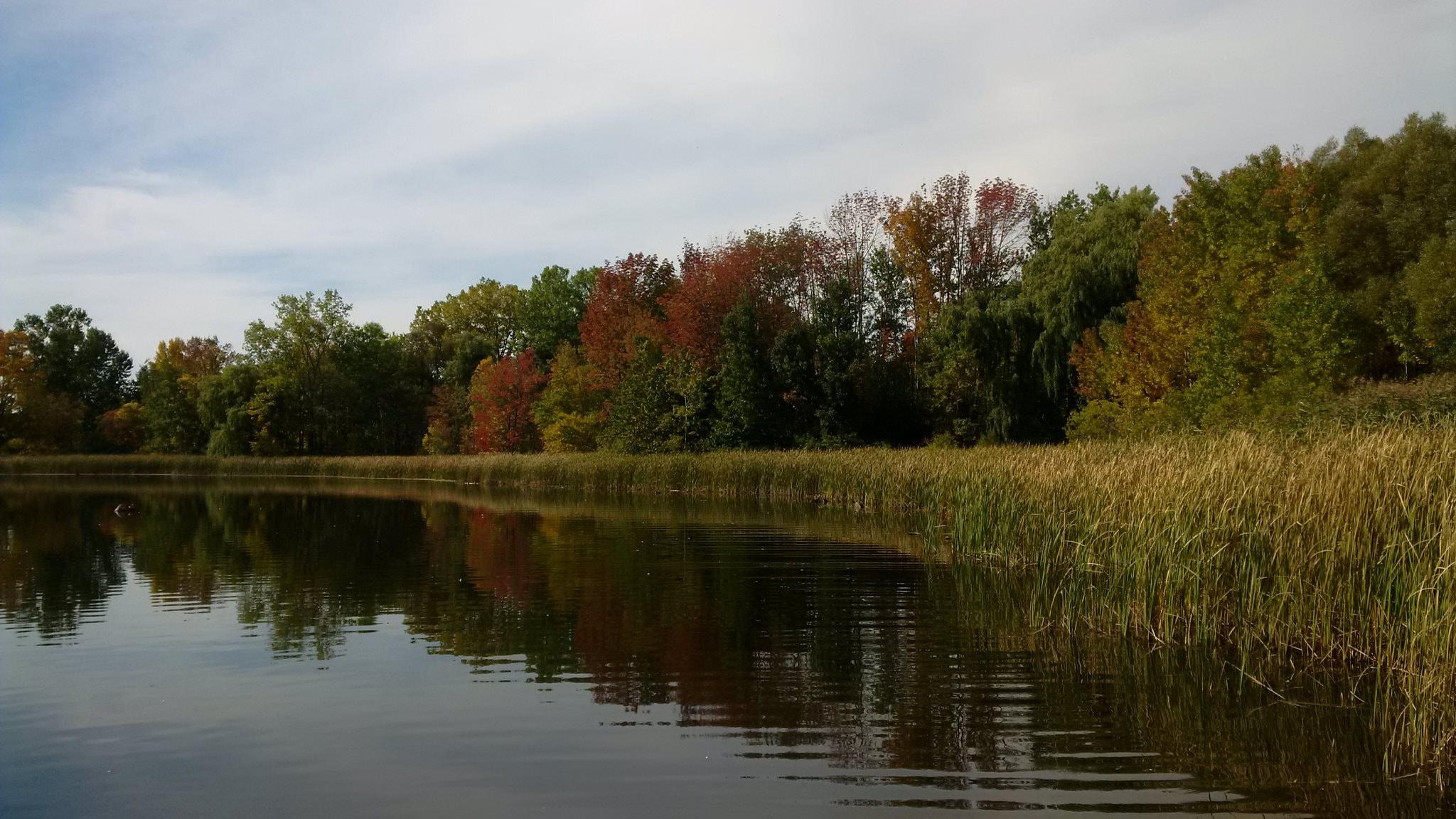
- Interactive map of Laurel Creek Conservation Area
- Location: Waterloo, Ontario, Canada
- Coordinates: 43.48642°N 80.57513°W
- Operator: Grand River Conservation Authority
- Owner: Grand River Conservation Authority

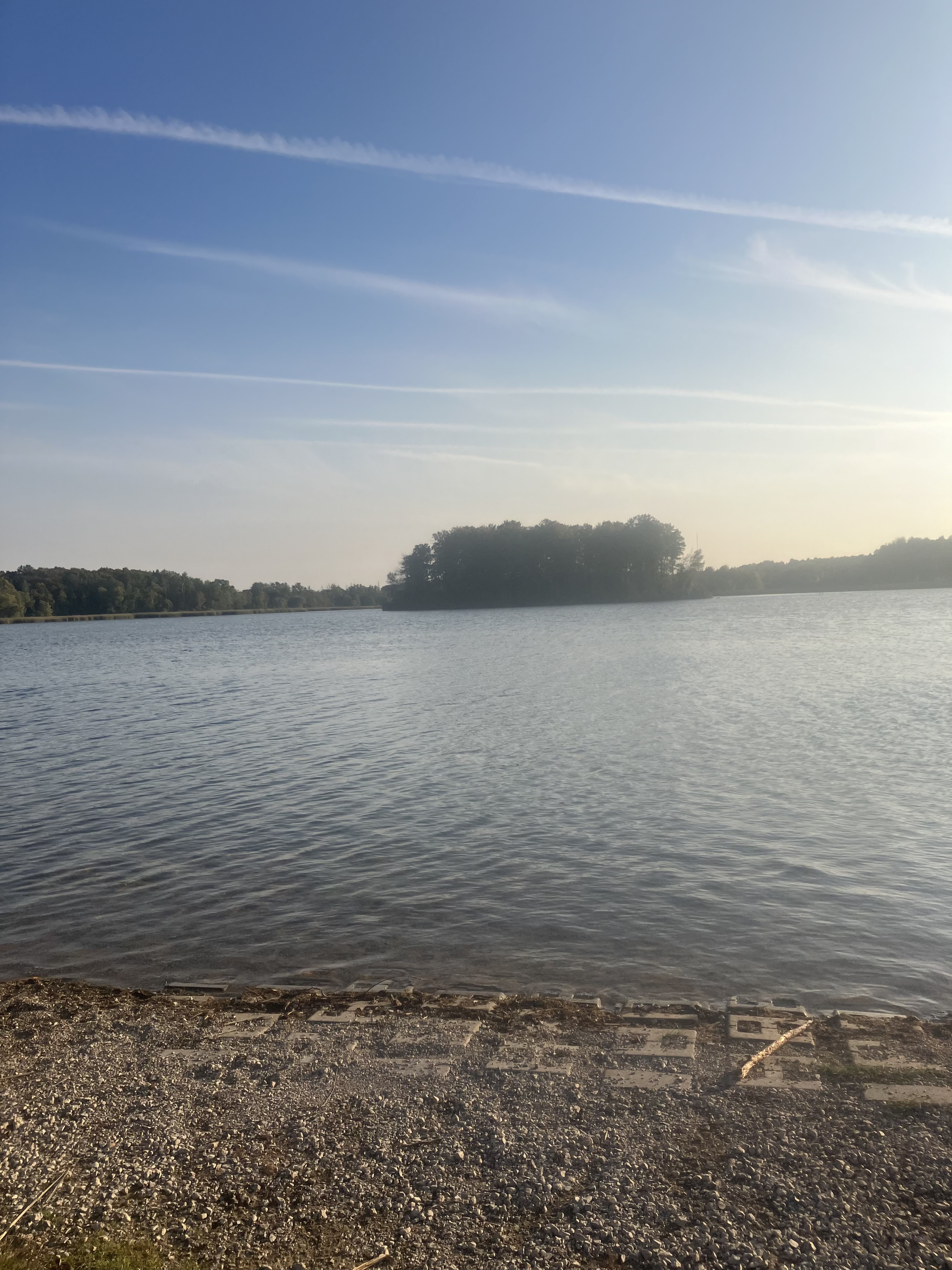
Photo of Laurel Creek Reservoir from the Boat Launch, facing an island

Laurel Creek Conservation Area, or simply Laurel Creek, is a park located in Waterloo, Ontario, Canada. The park is owned by the Grand River Conservation Authority (GRCA). Laurel Creek is open year-round and offers several outdoor activities, such as swimming, campsites, picnic tables, and playgrounds. Laurel Creek includes 114 campsites. 76 campsites are serviced and 38 are unserviced.
