= Walter Bean Grand River Trail =

Trail in Ontario

Coordinates: 43°28′32″N 80°26′57″W

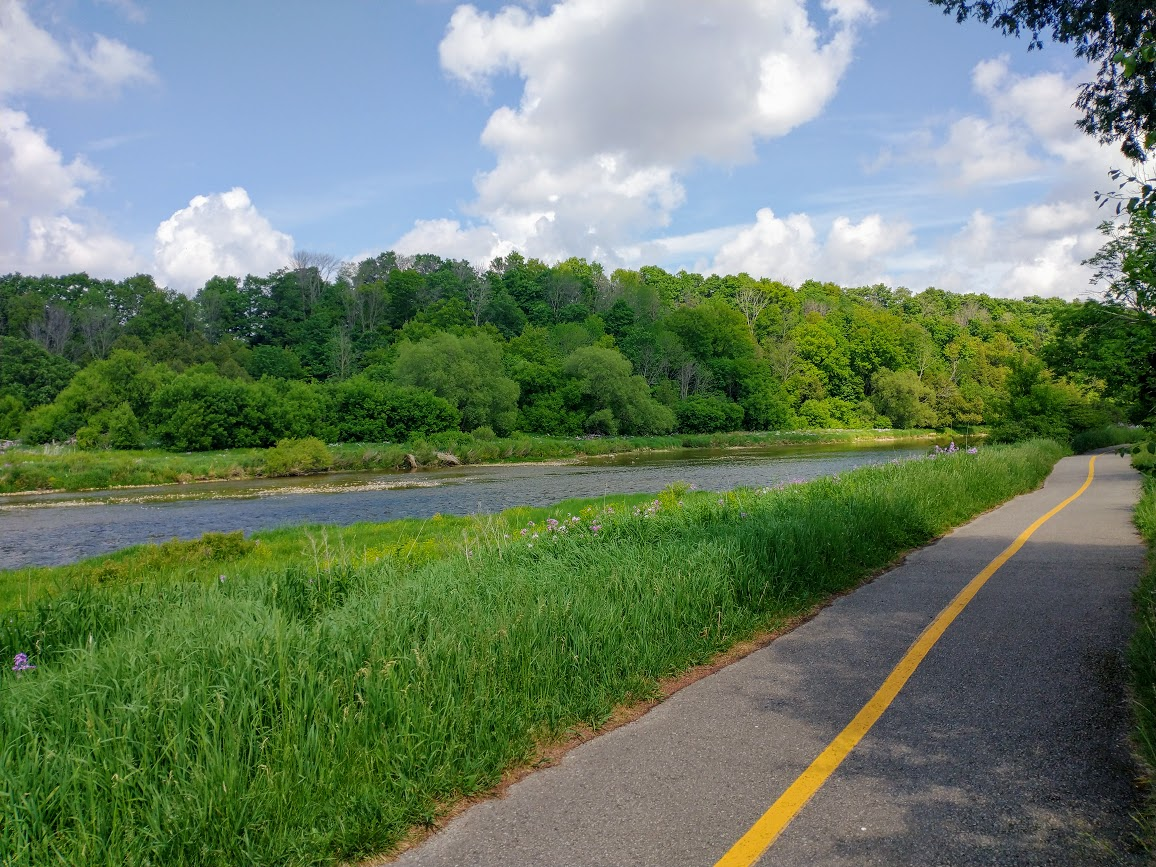
- The Walter Bean Grand River Trail in Waterloo, Ontario
- Length: 76 km (47 mi)
- Location: Cambridge, Ontario; Kitchener, Ontario; Waterloo, Ontario
- Use: Walking; cycling; rollerblading; cross-country skiing
- Difficulty: Moderate
- Season: Year-round
- Sights: Grand River; Grey Silo Golf Course; RIM Park; Waterloo Pioneer Memorial Tower; Bingemans
- Surface: Gravel / asphalt
- Right of way: Public roadways (partial)
- Maintainer: Local municipalities

The Walter Bean Grand River Trail (also sometimes shortened as the Walter Bean Trail) is a 76-kilometre (47 mi) multi-use trail that runs along the Grand River in the Regional Municipality of Waterloo, Ontario, Canada. The trail runs through the cities of Cambridge, Kitchener and Waterloo and is owned and maintained by the cities. It is considered part of the larger Grand Valley Trail, a 250-kilometre (160 mi) route that runs along much of the length of the river. A section of the trail is labelled the Economical Insurance Trailway, spanning from the Waterloo city limits in the north to the start of the Cambridge city limits in the south.

== Route description ==
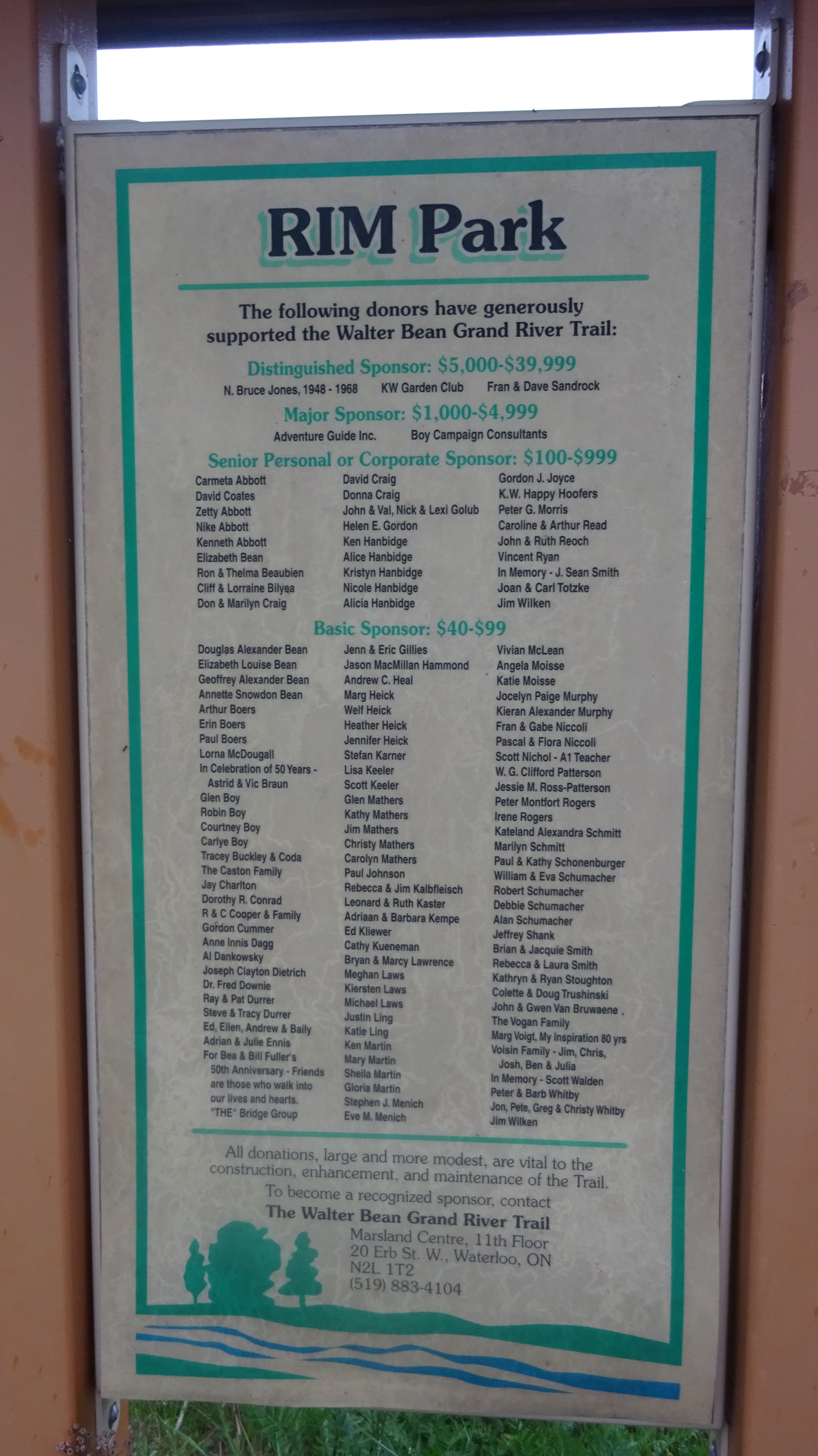
A sign listing some fundraisers of the Walter Bean Grand River Trail

The 76-kilometre (47 mi) long Walter Bean Grand River Trail runs along the Grand River. The Grand River serves as the eastern city limits for both Waterloo and northern Kitchener, so therefore the trail mostly runs on the eastern edge of both cities. The trail is between Woolwich Township and North Dumfries. A 6.2-kilometre (3.9 mi) section of the trail in Cambridge is part of the Trans Canada Trail, therefore providing access to the rest of the Trans Canada Trail.

The route varies, either using 2-metre-wide (6 ft 7 in) gravel trails located on the river banks or travelling along residential roads to bypass private properties and unbuilt trail.

== History ==
The Walter Bean Grand River Trail is named after Walter Bean, who created the idea of a continuous trail through the Waterloo Region. The project was announced in 1999. It was constructed in phases and by 2004 was 70 percent completed. The basic construction cost was set to $6.4 million (U$5.12 million) or $10 million (U$8 million) adjusted for inflation. Ninety-nine percent of the total was fundraised by September 2006. After construction, the trail was further supported by donors, whom received recognition and plaques in various public spaces. Later, the ownership and management of the trail was transferred to the cities of Waterloo, Kitchener, and Cambridge.

In June 2017, the Kitchener portion of the trail was temporarily closed due to flooding from the river. Beginning in 2020, a municipal initiative called Trail Mix, consisting of signs with QR codes linking to songs and poems, was implemented on the Walter Bean Trail.

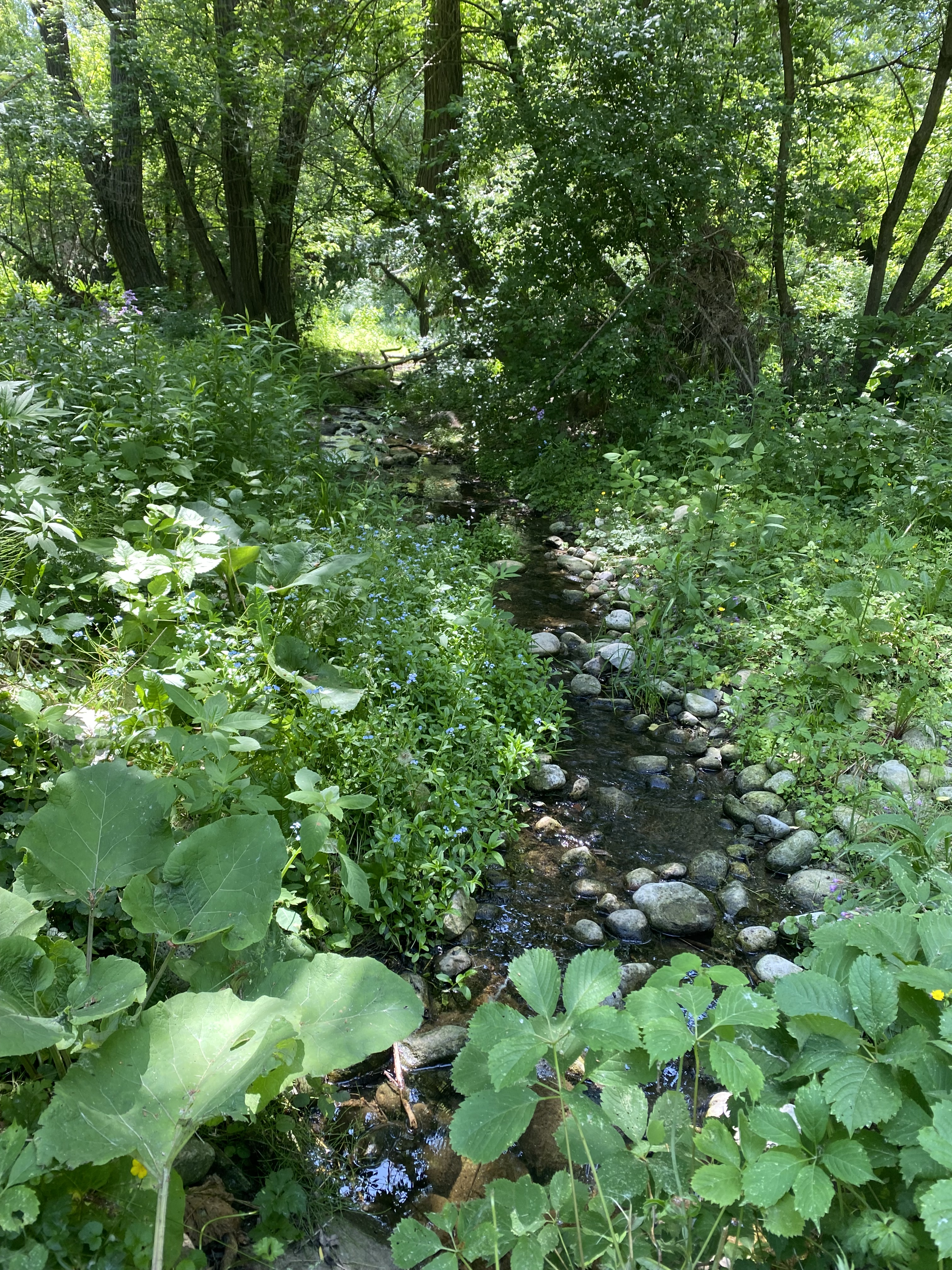
Stream near Pioneer Tower on the Walter Bean Trail, Kitchener, June 2025

== See also ==
- Iron Horse Trail (Ontario)
- Spurline Trail
- List of trails in Canada
