= Waterloo Public Library =

Public library system for Waterloo, Canada

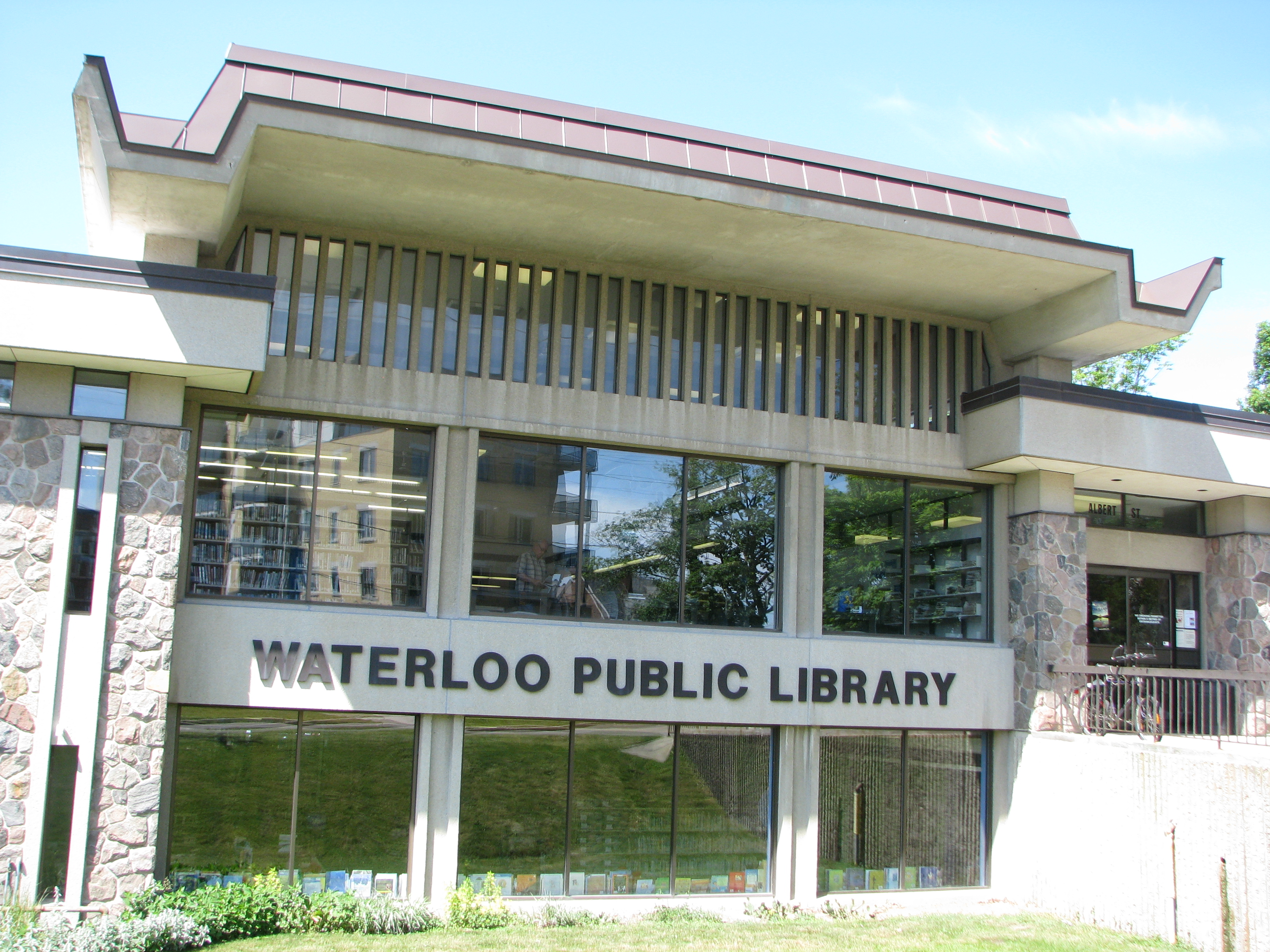
- Facade of main branch at Albert Street.
- Location: Waterloo, Ontario, Canada
- Established: 1888
- Branches: 4

Other information
- Website: www.wpl.ca

The Waterloo Public Library (abbreviated as WPL) is the public library system for Waterloo, Ontario, Canada. Founded in 1888, the library has four branches, as of May 2025.

== Services ==
The Waterloo Public Library has an extensive collection of books that are available to be borrowed. The Waterloo Public Library also offers a variety of services through its four locations. Patrons are able to book laptops or other devices such as photo scanners, microfilm machines, or VHS converters. Patrons can use the library to access the internet, use 3D printing, and get tech support. There are also a variety of spaces available for patrons such as quiet study spaces, spaces available for rent to individuals or groups, "Digispace" which is a recording area, "Gamerspace" at the Eastside Branch, or the Maker Bar.

== History ==
The Waterloo Mechanics' Institute began in 1875, it was inaugurated 18 February 1876. The institute purchased their first books in 1876 and stored them on a table in Town Hall. They had a $2.00 annual subscription fee to use these materials, later reduced to $1.00. Subscribers were asked whether they wanted English or German books. The funds were used to purchase more books and eventually shelves.

In 1888, the Mechanics' Institute transferred their assets to the municipality of Waterloo to form the Waterloo Free Library as a result of public demand. In 1900, the education department threatened to withhold funds for the library if suitable reading rooms were not built. A proposed solution advocated for the creation of a reading room in town hall which would have displaced the firefighters. The unpopular nature of this proposal led the Mayor to solicit the Carnegie Corporation to build a new library building. In 1902, $10,000 were granted by Andrew Carnegie to build the Carnegie Library building (located at 40 Albert St, across from the current Main Branch). The library was opened in 1905. One provision of the grant was that the municipality fund the library at ten percent or more of the total for maintenance.

=== First librarian ===
Emma Belle Roos served as Waterloo's librarian from 1905 to 1949. Roos began her career as librarian in 1905 when the city's Carnegie library opened. She had previously worked as part-time librarian of the free library that had been housed at city hall, a position she began at the age of 21. By 1948 the library holdings at grown to 17,000 books and Roos, who spent many years working alone, had a full-time assistant. She retired on August 1, 1949, and was honoured during a dinner held at the Walper Hotel and attended by Waterloo mayor Vernon Bauman.

=== Eastside Branch ===
Since 2015, plans for the Eastside Branch Library have been underway. In September 2020, the tender for constructing the library was awarded to Fortis Construction Group at $7 million. The library's design was created by John MacDonald Architect and Ward 99 Architects. The library is built into the existing RIM Park Manulife Sportsplex, located in East Waterloo. The Record estimated that "a typical Waterloo household will pay $19 annually to operate the new library". The library is includes computers, 3D printers, recording rooms, a gamerspace, a program room, two study rooms, a makerspace, and an outdoor naturespace. Architect David Warne stated:

In the old days you would go into a library and you would hear the librarian go 'Shhh.' They don't want that now. Now there's collaborative group study and noisy activities and gaming rooms and 3D printers. This is a trend that kind of came from the tech industry.

The Eastside Branch opened May 7, 2022.

== Branches ==
WPL has four branches:

| Branch | Location | Coordinates | Year Opened | Notes |
| Main Branch | 35 Albert Street | 43.466115°N 80.524383°W | 1966 | Oldest branch |
| Albert McCormick Branch | 500 Parkside Drive | 43.488943°N 80.544564°W | 1973 | Located at Albert McCormick Community Centre |
| John M. Harper Branch | 500 Fischer-Hallman Road North | 43.474329°N 80.571201°W | 2011 | Located near Stork Family YMCA |
| Eastside Branch | 2001 University Ave E, Waterloo | 43.519754°N 80.500475°W | 2022 | Within RIM Park |

== See also ==
- List of public libraries in Ontario
- List of Carnegie libraries in Canada
