= Waterloo, Ontario =

City in Ontario, Canada

Waterloo
- City (lower-tier)
- City of Waterloo
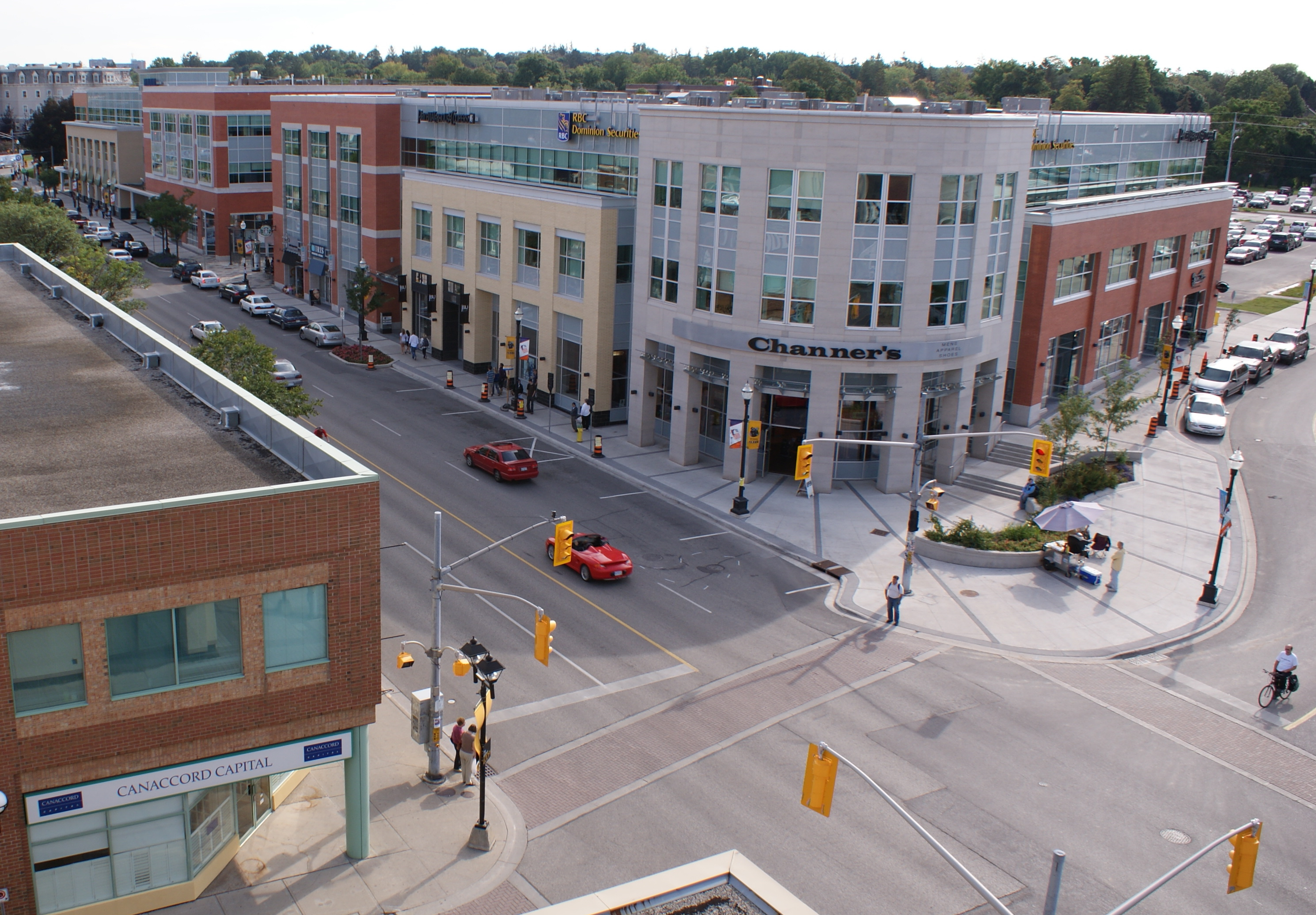
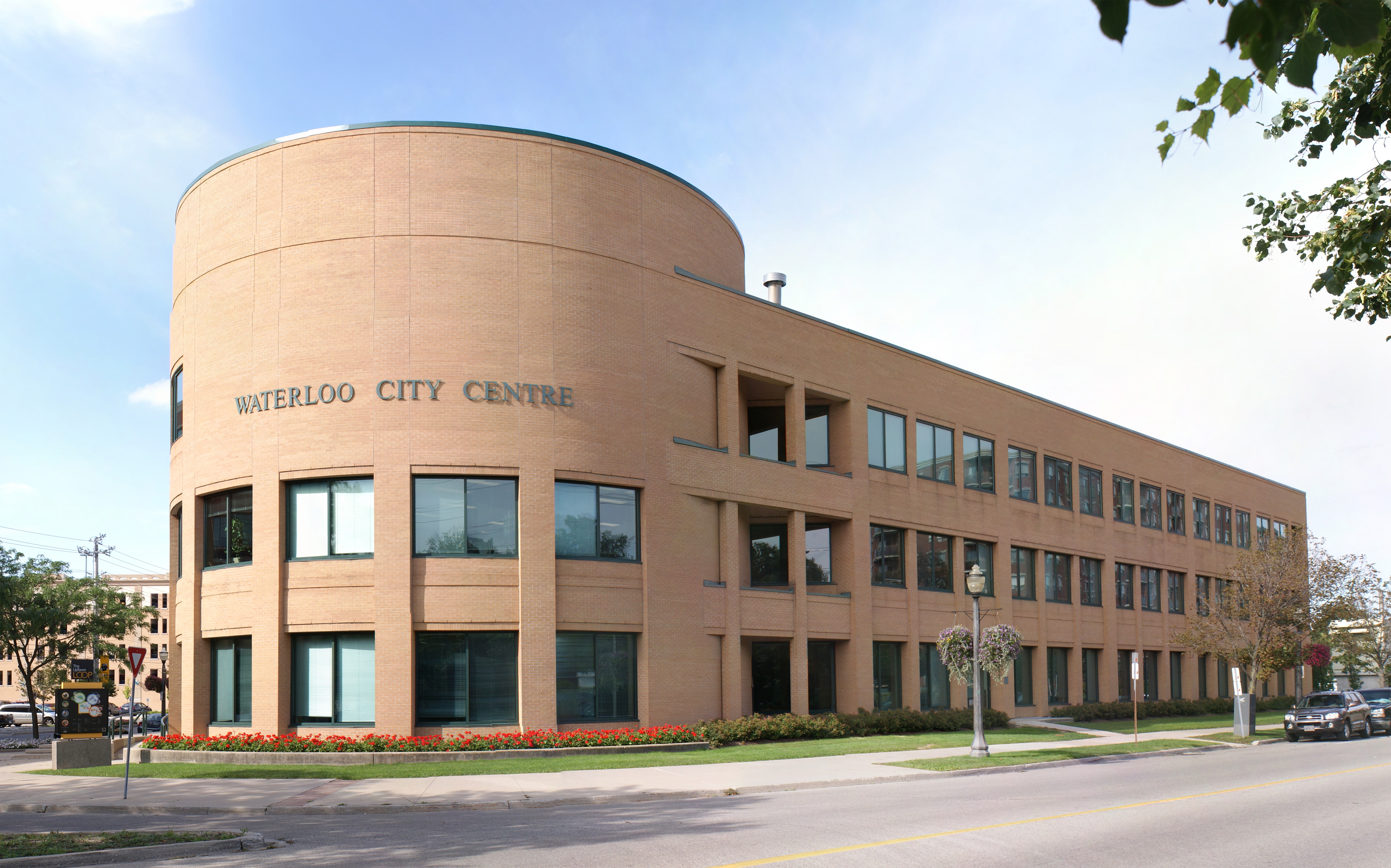
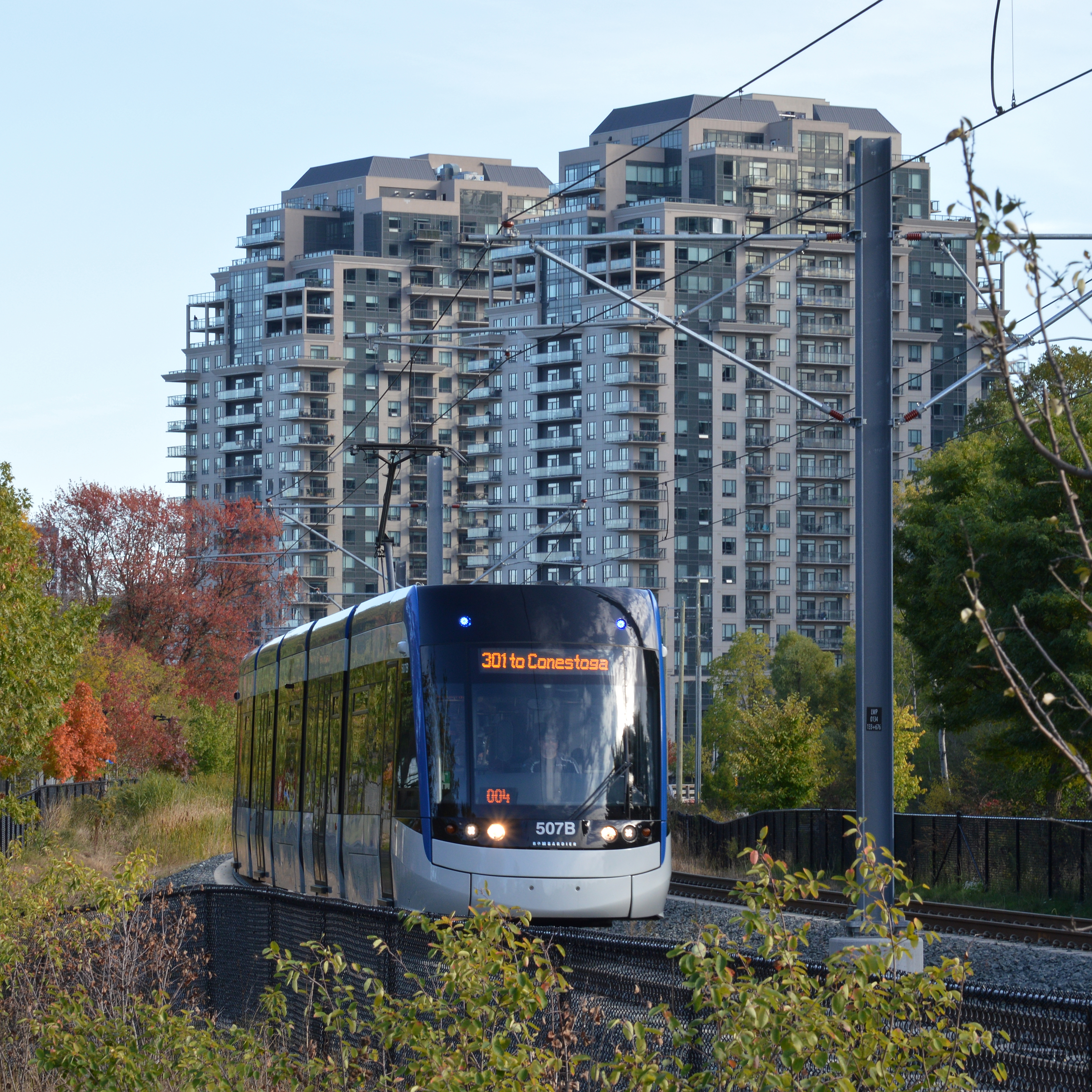
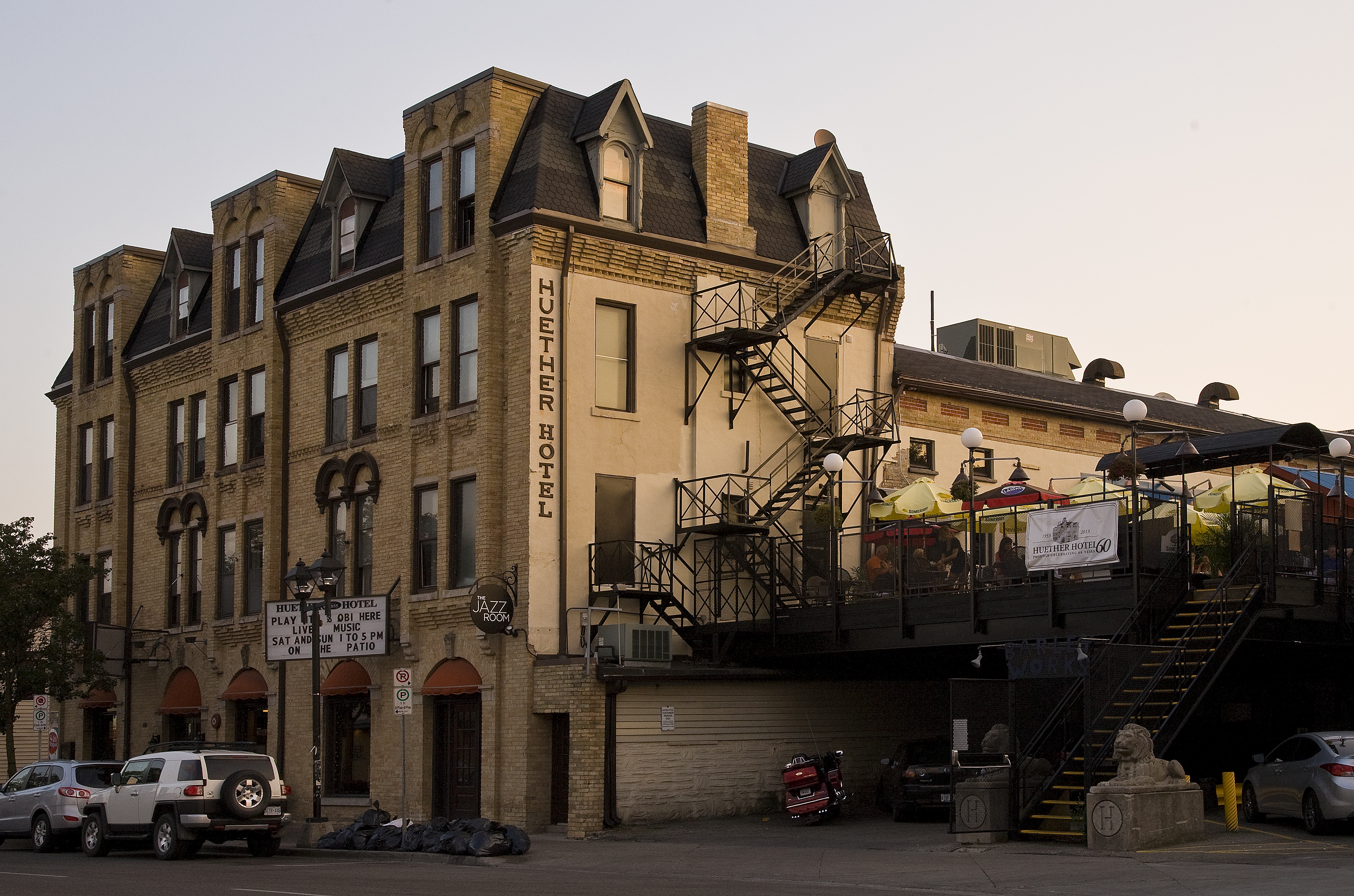
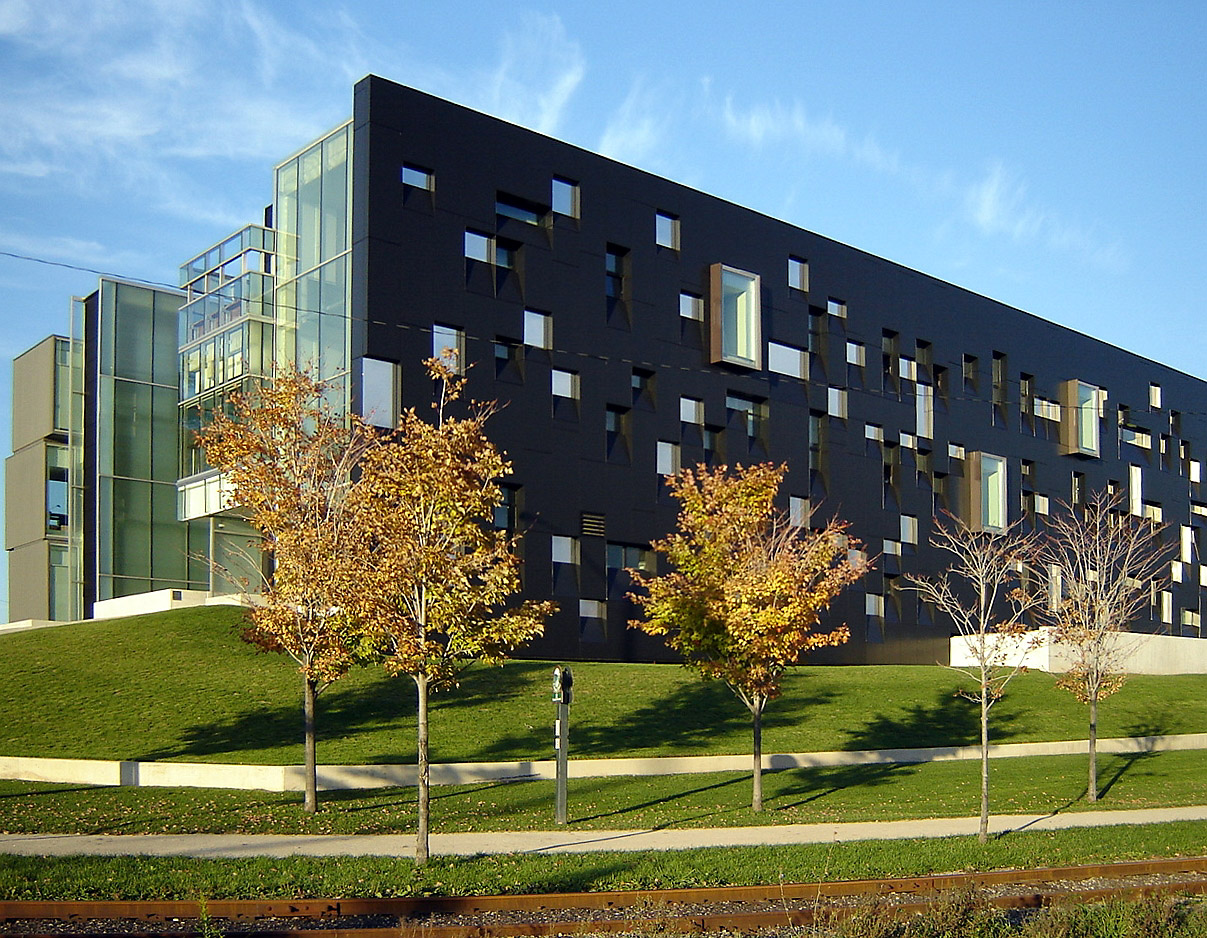
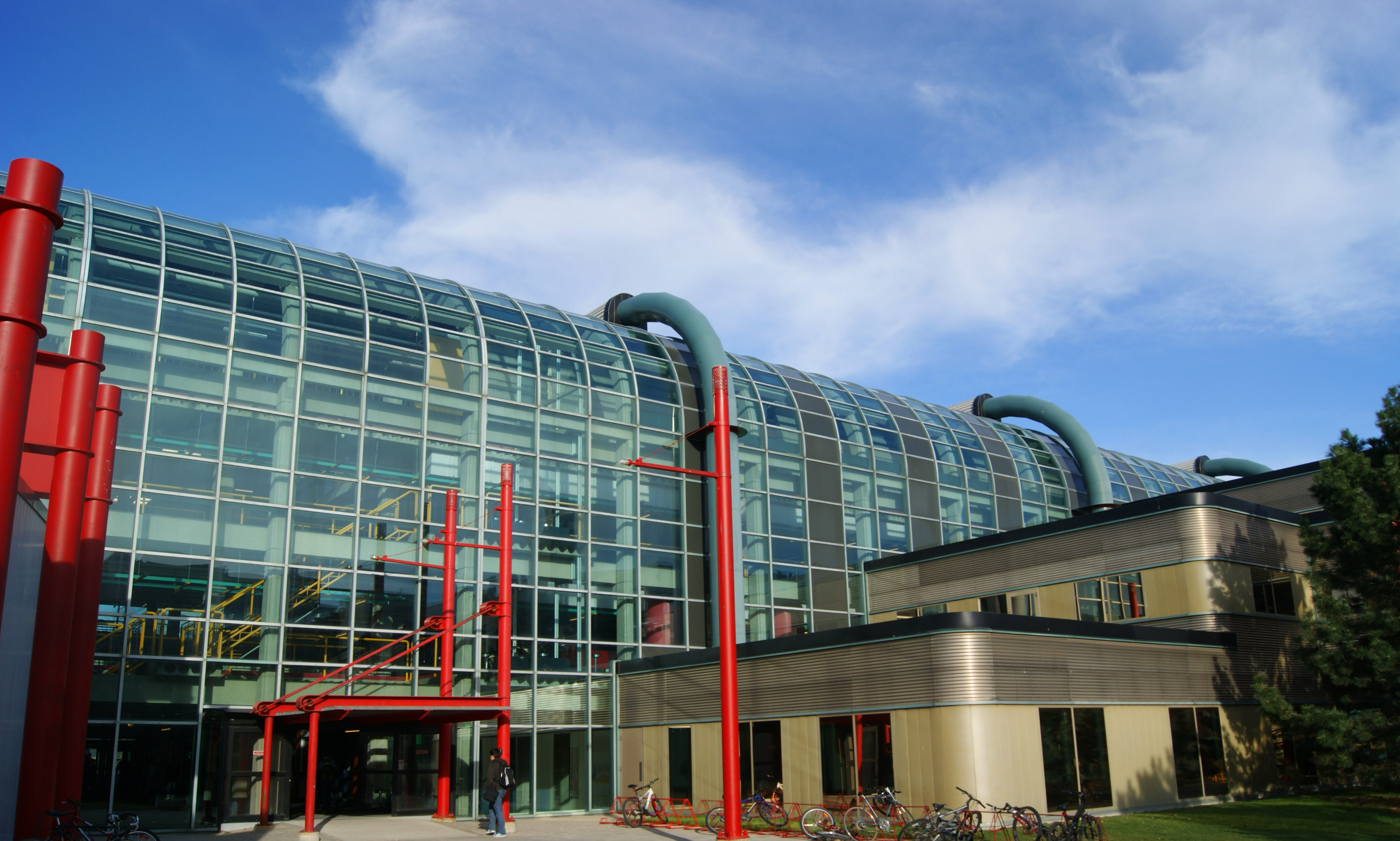
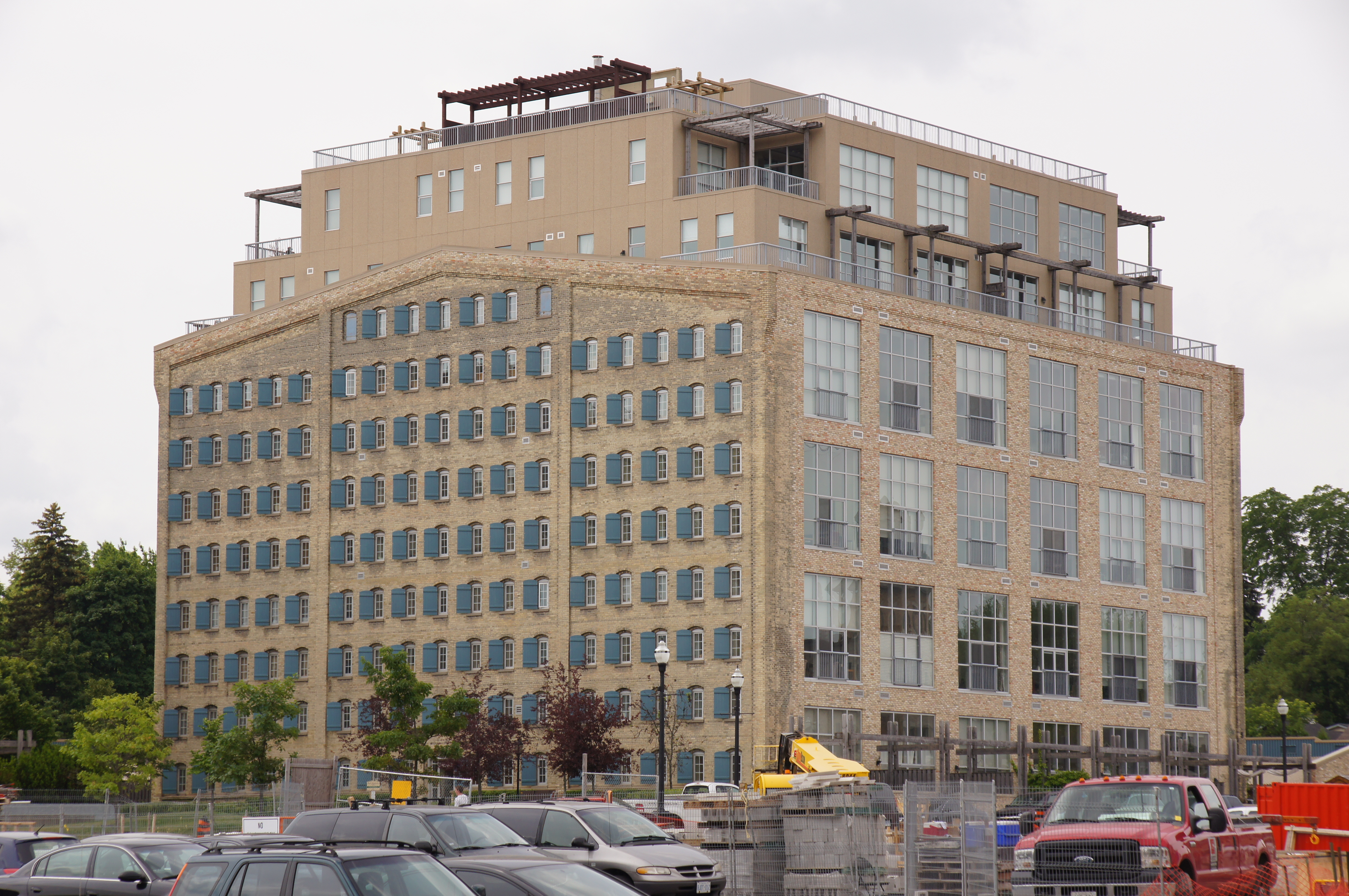
- Uptown Waterloo Waterloo City Hall Ion rapid transit The Huether Hotel Perimeter Institute Davis Centre (UW) Seagram Lofts

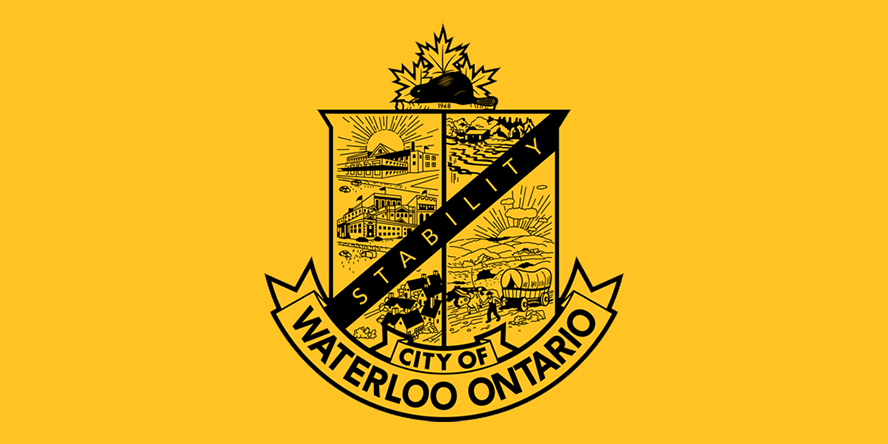
- Flag Logo
- Motto: Stability
- Interactive map of Waterloo
- Location within Regional Municipality of Waterloo Location within Southern Ontario Location within Ontario Location within Canada Location within Earth
- Coordinates: 43°28′N 80°31′W
- Country: Canada
- Province: Ontario
- Region: Waterloo
- Incorporated: May 27, 1857; 169 years ago

Government
  - Mayor: Shannon Weber
  - Governing Body: Waterloo City Council
  - City CAO: Tim Anderson
  - MP: Bardish Chagger (Liberal)
  - MPP: Catherine Fife (ONDP)

Area
  - Land: 64.06 km^{2} (24.73 sq mi)
- Elevation: 329 m (1,079 ft)

Population (2021)
  - City (lower-tier): 121,436 (47th)
  - Density: 1,895.8/km^{2} (4,910/sq mi)
  - Metro: 575,847 (10th)
  - Metro density: 527.2/km^{2} (1,365/sq mi)
- Demonym: Waterluvian
- Time zone: UTC−5
  - Summer (DST): UTC−4
- Forward sortation area: N2J to N2L, N2T to N2V
- Area codes: 519, 226, and 548
- Website: www.waterloo.ca

Waterloo is a city in the Canadian province of Ontario. It is one of three cities in the Regional Municipality of Waterloo (formerly Waterloo County). Waterloo is situated about 94 km (58 mi) west-southwest of Toronto, but it is not considered to be part of the Greater Toronto Area (GTA). At the time of the 2021 census, the population of Waterloo was 121,436.

Due to the close proximity of the city of Kitchener to Waterloo, the two together are often referred to as "Kitchener–Waterloo", "K-W", or "The Twin Cities". Nearby Cambridge, Ontario is also sometimes grouped in, creating KWC or "Tri-cities". While several unsuccessful attempts to combine the municipalities of Kitchener and Waterloo have been made, the 1973 establishment of the Region of Waterloo lessened motivation to do so, and as a result, Waterloo remains an independent city.

== History ==
=== Indigenous peoples and settlement ===
Indigenous peoples such as the Iroquois, Anishinaabe and Chonnonton lived in the area.

After the end of the American Revolution, Joseph Brant, a Mohawk war chief, wanted the colonial governor, Frederick Haldimand, to give the Mohawk of the Six Nations a tract of land surrounding the Grand River, in return for their loyalty to the British in the war. Haldimand's 1784 Haldimand Proclamation granted the land "six miles deep from either side of the [Grand River] beginning at Lake Erie and extending in that proportion to the very head of the said river." Haldimand, who had previously ordered for potential mill sites to be identified in the region, decreed in 1788 that mill sites would be included in the grant (which would not have been included otherwise). In 1796, Richard Beasley purchased Block Number 2 of the grant from Joseph Brant (on behalf of the Six Nations) with a mortgage held by the Six Nations. Block 2, sized at 94,012 acres, was situated in the District of Gore. To meet his mortgage obligations, Beasley had to sell portions of the land to settlers. This was counter to the original mortgage agreement, but subsequent changes to the agreement were made to permit land sales.

Mennonites from Pennsylvania counties Lancaster and Montgomery were the first wave of immigrants to the area. In the year 1800 alone, Beasley sold over 14,000 acres to Mennonite settlers. A group of 26 Mennonites from Lancaster County, Pennsylvania, pooled their resources into the German Company of Pennsylvania, which was then represented by Daniel Erb and Samuel Bricker. The company purchased all the unsold land from Beasley in 1803, resulting in a discharge of the mortgage held by the Six Nations. This discharge allowed Beasley to clear his obligation with the Six Nations, and allowed the settlers to have deeds to their purchased land. The payment to Beasley, in cash, arrived from Pennsylvania in kegs, carried in a wagon surrounded by armed guards.

Many of the pioneers who arrived from Pennsylvania after November 1803 bought land in a 60,000-acre tract of Block 2 from the German Company of Pennsylvania. The tract included almost two-thirds of Block 2. Many of the first farms were least 400 acres in size.

=== Development (19th century) ===
The Mennonites divided the land into smaller lots; two lots owned by Abraham Erb—who is often called the founder of the Village of Waterloo—became the central core of Waterloo. Erb had come to the area in 1806 from Pennsylvania. He had bought 4,000 acres (1,600 ha) from the German Company Tract and settled where there was enough water power to operate mills. He founded a sawmill in 1808 and grist mill in 1816; they saw business flourish. Other early settlers of what would become Waterloo included Samuel and Elia Schneider, who arrived in 1816. Until about 1820, settlements such as this were quite small. Erb also built what is now known as the Erb-Kumpf House in c. 1812, making it likely one of the oldest homes in Waterloo.

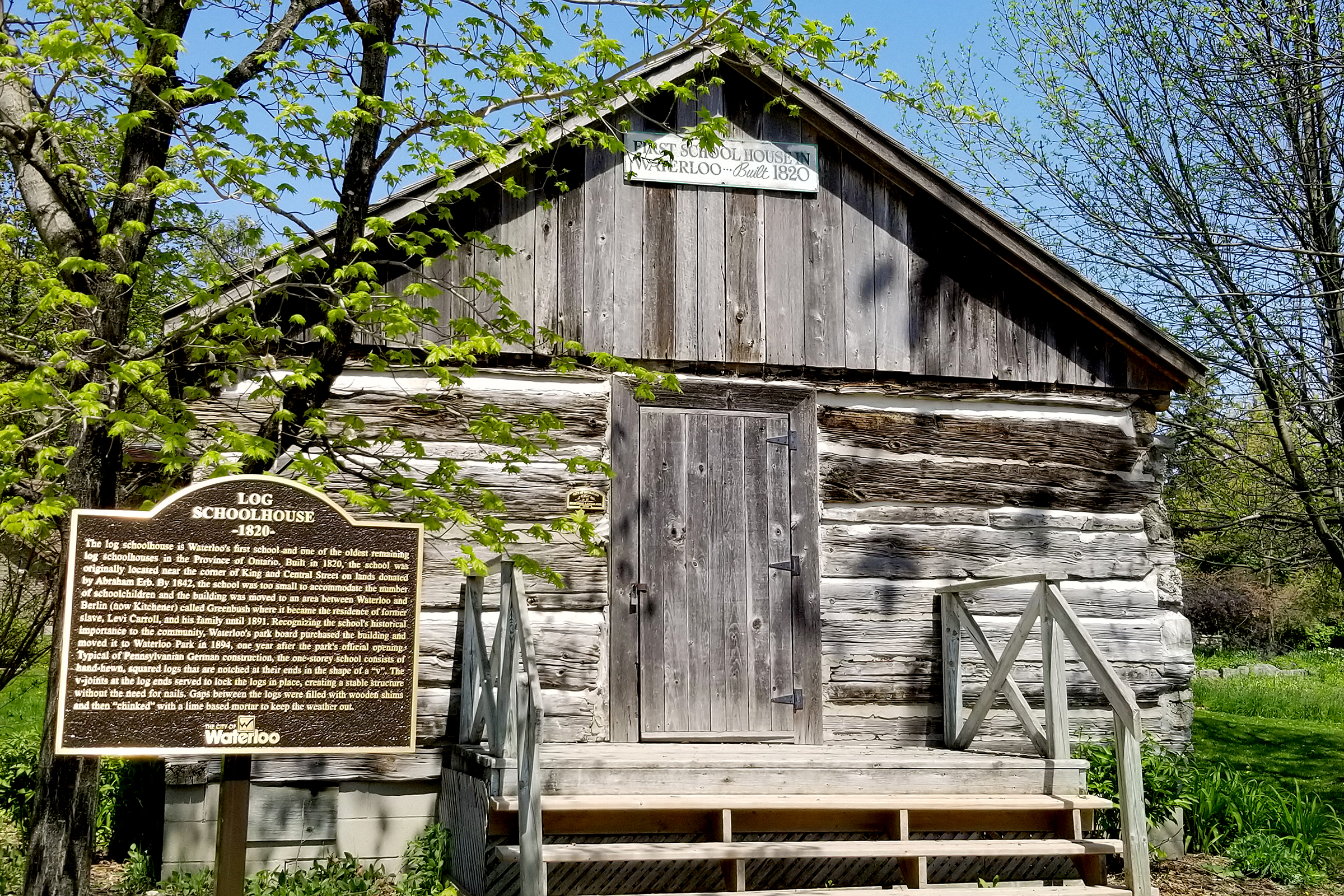
The first schoolhouse in Waterloo, built in 1820

The first school in what is now the City of Waterloo was built on land donated by Erb; the log building was constructed in 1820. A larger school house of stone was built in 1842 and was replaced with a brick school building in 1852. Over the decades, the log building was moved, eventually to Waterloo Park, where it still stands. The German spoken in Waterloo County is based upon the 18th century Pennsylvania Dutch dialect. In turn, the Pennsylvania Dutch dialect is based upon the dialect of German spoken in southwestern Germany.

In 1816, the new Waterloo Township was officially incorporated while being named after Waterloo, Belgium, the site of the Battle of Waterloo (1815), which had ended the Napoleonic Wars in Europe. After that war, the new township became a popular destination for German immigrants. By the 1840s, German settlers had overtaken the Mennonites as the dominant segment of the population. Many Germans settled in the small hamlet to the southeast of Waterloo. In their honour, the village was named Berlin in 1833 (renamed to Kitchener in 1916). The first Catholic family to arrive were the Spetz family from Alsace who came in 1828.

By 1831, Waterloo had a small post office in the King and Erb Street area, operated by Daniel Snyder, some 11 years before one would open in neighbouring Berlin. The Smith's Canadian Gazetteer of 1846 states that the Township of Waterloo (smaller than Waterloo County) consisted primarily of Pennsylvanian Mennonites and immigrants directly from Germany who had brought money with them. At the time, many did not speak English. There were eight grist and twenty sawmills in the township. In 1841, the population count was 4,424. In 1846 the village of Waterloo had a population of 200, "mostly Germans". There was a grist mill and a sawmill and some tradesmen. By comparison, Berlin (Kitchener) had a population of about 400, also "mostly German", and more tradesmen than the village of Waterloo.

Berlin was chosen as the site of the seat for the County of Waterloo in 1853. By 1869, the population was 2,000. Waterloo was incorporated as a village in 1857 and became the Town of Waterloo in 1876. The Kitchener Public Utilities Commission began providing streetcar service in the region in 1888. In the 19th century, Waterloo was dominated by people of German origin with 76% of Waterloo residents in the 1911 census listing their family origins as being in Germany.

=== 20th and 21st centuries ===
The Galt, Preston and Hespeler electric railway (later called the Grand River Railway) connected to Waterloo in 1911 and ended service in 1931. The Kitchener Public Utilities Commission stopped providing streetcar service in 1947, and were replaced by electric trolley coaches. Waterloo was incorporated as the City of Waterloo in 1948. The trolley coaches ended service in 1973. In 1911, a plan was mooted to pave King street. William Snider who owned the town square, did not want to pay the higher taxes, which would refused from paving King Street. Snider offered to deed the town square to town, which instead demanded he pay the higher taxes. Snider sold the town square to the Molson Bank, which up a Beaux Arts style bank on the site of the town square in 1914. In 1929, the H.V. McKay company of Australia proposed to open a factory for "one, man, self-propelled combine harvesters". The town provided the land for the factory from the Canada Barrels and Kegs and fixed the tax assessment at $25, 000 per year for the next 10 years in exchange for the factory being built. In 1911, Waterloo Lutheran seminary, which later became Wilfrid Laurier University, was opened. On 5 May 1916, a group of soldiers sacked the German Acadian Club in Waterloo. In October 1918, Spanish flu reached Waterloo. Over 2,000 people were "down with the malady". By November 1918, the Waterloo Chronicle reported that "twice as many had died from the influenza as had been killed in action in four years of war".

The presence of the University of Waterloo in the city caused technological and innovative companies to base in Waterloo, especially companies specializing in computing and software. For example, Research in Motion (now BlackBerry Limited), which developed BlackBerry, was started by Mike Lazaridis and Doug Fregin in 1984. In 1965, the University of Waterloo was the second-largest private sector employer. The construction of the buildings for the University of Waterloo made the unemployment rate very low in the 1960s. By 1971, the population of Waterloo had grown 424% since 1945. Kitchener was a working class city while Waterloo was a middle class city. In 1981, the average annual household income in Kitchener was $26, 279 and in Waterloo was $31,224. In 1950, Waterloo had 55 factories that employed 2, 572 people, in 1970 had 79 factories that employed 5,483 workers, and in 1980 there were 132 factories that employed 7,314 workers. The founding of the universities led to the north-eastern area becoming developed as the new housing subdivisions were built while the area around Weber declined. The architecture of Waterloo changed from a more traditional Victorian architecture style to favouring a more streamlined look, incorporating elements from architectural styles such as Postmodern architecture, which ultimately led to a movement to preserve Waterloo's historical core. A 1994 issue of the Financial Post mentioned Waterloo-based companies MKS, WATCOM, and Open Text in a list of the top 100 independent software companies in Canada. In 1960, a study revealed 50% of the buying by Waterloo consumers was done in Kitchener, leading to the city to develop a retail district.

In the 1980s, Waterloo came to have the character of a "post-industrial city". Mennonite farmers continued to come to Waterloo in their horse-powered buggies for shopping while the middle-class people drove out to eat and drink at the numerous pubs and hotels out in the countryside.

In June 2011, the Waterloo Region council approved the Ion: a light rail transit line connecting Conestoga Mall in north Waterloo and Fairview Park Mall in south Kitchener. Construction on the Ion began in August 2014. In 2016, two sections of a corduroy road were unearthed. One was in the King Street area of the business district and the second was discovered near the Conestoga Mall. The road was probably built by Mennonites using technology acquired in Lancaster County, Pennsylvania, between the late 1790s and 1816. The log road was buried in about 1840 and a new road built on top of it. The road had been built for access to the mill but was also "one of the first roads cut through (the woods) so people could start settling the area". Ion service began in 2019 and experienced a daily ridership of 25,000 in November 2020.

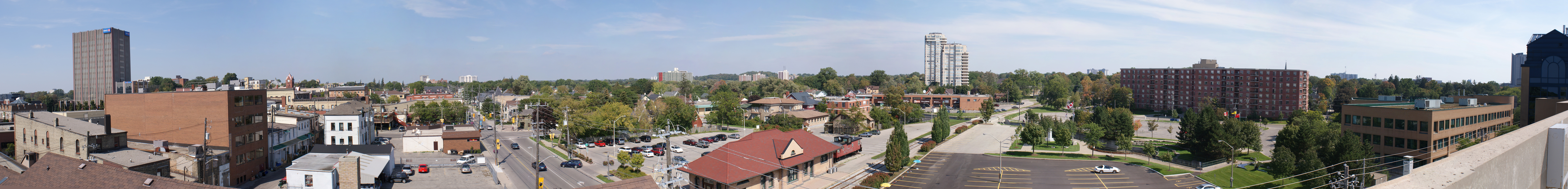
Uptown looking Northwest from the Uptown Parkade. Landmarks visible include the Marsland Centre on the extreme left and Waterloo City Hall on the extreme right.

== Geography ==
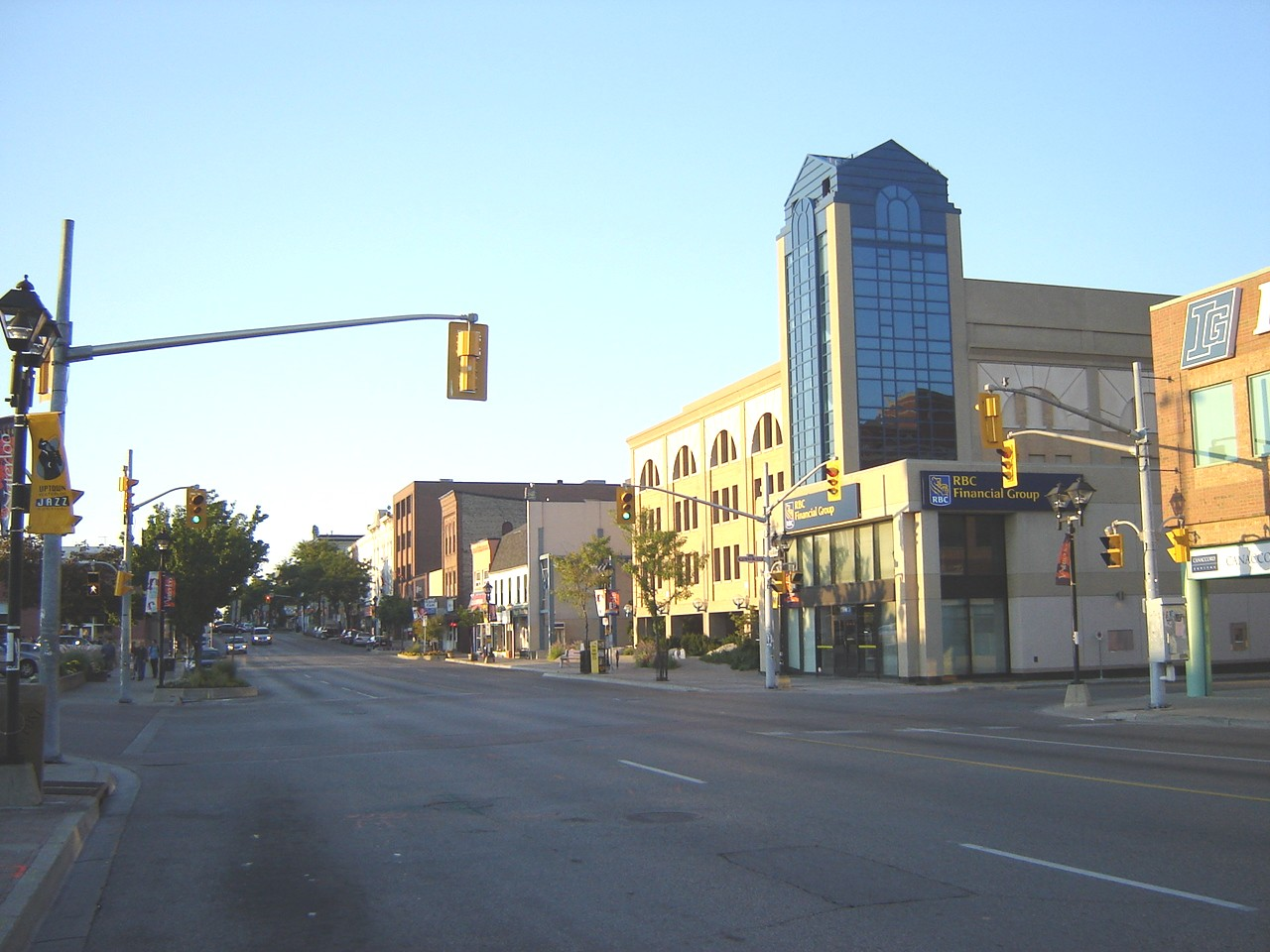
King Street South in Uptown Waterloo

Waterloo's city centre is near the intersection of King and Erb streets. The city centre was once along Albert Street, near the Marsland Centre and the Waterloo Public Library. The town hall, fire hall, and farmers' market were located there. Amidst some controversy, all were demolished between 1965 and 1969.

Historically, Waterloo's swamp land near where the village was first developed caused problems for development. To mitigate these issues, sand was taken from nearby areas to raise the land; buildings were built on foundations of oak planks; and King Street was originally built as a corduroy road.

=== Waterways ===
The Grand River, as seen to the north-east of Waterloo

The Grand River flows southward along the city's east side. Its most significant tributary within the city is Laurel Creek, whose source lies just to the west of the city limits and its mouth just to the east, and crosses much of the city's central areas, including the University of Waterloo lands and Waterloo Park; it flows under the uptown area in a culvert. In the city's west end, the Waterloo Moraine provides over 300,000 people in the region with drinking water. Much of the gently hilly Waterloo Moraine underlies existing developed areas. Ongoing urban growth, mostly low-density residential suburbs (in accordance with requests by land developers), will cover increasing amounts of the remaining undeveloped portions of the Waterloo Moraine.

=== Climate ===
Waterloo has a humid continental climate of the warm summer subtype (Dfb under the Köppen climate classification) with warm, humid summers and cold winters. Compared to other parts of Canada, Waterloo has fairly moderate weather. Winter temperatures usually occur between mid-December and mid-March, while summer temperatures generally occur between mid-May and late September. It is not uncommon for temperatures to exceed 30 °C (86 °F) several times each summer. Waterloo has approximately 140 frost-free days per year.

Climate data for Region of Waterloo International Airport, 1991–2020 normals, extremes 1914–present (Note: Daily maximum and minimum temperatures and precipitation were recorded at Kitchener from October 1914 to December 1977 and at Region of Waterloo International Airport from March 1970 to present.)
Month	Jan	Feb	Mar	Apr	May	Jun	Jul	Aug	Sep	Oct	Nov	Dec	Year
Record high °C (°F)	14.9 (58.8)	16.8 (62.2)	26.5 (79.7)	30.0 (86.0)	33.3 (91.9)	36.7 (98.1)	38.3 (100.9)	38.3 (100.9)	36.7 (98.1)	31.1 (88.0)	25.0 (77.0)	18.7 (65.7)	38.3 (100.9)
Mean daily maximum °C (°F)	−2.3 (27.9)	−1.4 (29.5)	4.1 (39.4)	11.6 (52.9)	19.0 (66.2)	24.1 (75.4)	26.6 (79.9)	25.5 (77.9)	21.6 (70.9)	14.1 (57.4)	6.8 (44.2)	0.7 (33.3)	12.5 (54.5)
Daily mean °C (°F)	−6.3 (20.7)	−5.9 (21.4)	−0.8 (30.6)	5.9 (42.6)	12.6 (54.7)	17.8 (64.0)	20.2 (68.4)	19.1 (66.4)	15.2 (59.4)	8.8 (47.8)	2.6 (36.7)	−2.8 (27.0)	7.2 (45.0)
Mean daily minimum °C (°F)	−10.3 (13.5)	−10.3 (13.5)	−5.6 (21.9)	0.1 (32.2)	6.2 (43.2)	11.5 (52.7)	13.7 (56.7)	12.7 (54.9)	8.7 (47.7)	3.4 (38.1)	−1.6 (29.1)	−6.3 (20.7)	1.9 (35.4)
Record low °C (°F)	−31.9 (−25.4)	−34.1 (−29.4)	−29.4 (−20.9)	−17.8 (0.0)	−6.1 (21.0)	−1.1 (30.0)	4.2 (39.6)	1.1 (34.0)	−3.7 (25.3)	−10.6 (12.9)	−18.9 (−2.0)	−28.3 (−18.9)	−34.1 (−29.4)
Average precipitation mm (inches)	66.3 (2.61)	46.1 (1.81)	57.0 (2.24)	81.2 (3.20)	80.2 (3.16)	80.5 (3.17)	96.2 (3.79)	67.2 (2.65)	75.2 (2.96)	71.0 (2.80)	74.9 (2.95)	54.9 (2.16)	850.6 (33.49)
Average rainfall mm (inches)	28.7 (1.13)	29.7 (1.17)	36.8 (1.45)	68.0 (2.68)	81.8 (3.22)	82.4 (3.24)	98.6 (3.88)	83.9 (3.30)	87.8 (3.46)	66.1 (2.60)	75.0 (2.95)	38.0 (1.50)	776.8 (30.58)
Average snowfall cm (inches)	43.7 (17.2)	30.3 (11.9)	26.5 (10.4)	7.3 (2.9)	0.4 (0.2)	0.0 (0.0)	0.0 (0.0)	0.0 (0.0)	0.0 (0.0)	1.4 (0.6)	13.0 (5.1)	37.2 (14.6)	159.7 (62.9)
Average precipitation days (≥ 0.2 mm)	17.7	12.9	13.2	13.5	13.4	12.7	13.2	11.2	12.0	14.7	14.8	15.0	164.0
Average rainy days (≥ 0.2 mm)	5.6	5.0	6.9	11.5	12.4	12.0	10.6	10.7	12.2	13.7	11.6	6.9	118.7
Average snowy days (≥ 0.2 cm)	16.1	11.9	9.0	3.3	0.18	0.0	0.0	0.0	0.0	0.91	6.5	14.4	62.2
Average relative humidity (%) (at 0600 LST)	86.4	83.4	84.8	84.4	84.7	87.0	90.1	93.6	94.3	90.6	87.6	87.1	87.8
Source: Environment Canada (rainfall/snowfall/humidity 1981–2010)

== Demographics ==
Historical population
Year	Pop.	±%
1841	200	—
1871	1,594	+697.0%
1881	2,066	+29.6%
1891	2,941	+42.4%
1901	3,537	+20.3%
1911	4,359	+23.2%
1921	5,883	+35.0%
1931	8,095	+37.6%
1941	8,968	+10.8%
1951	11,991	+33.7%
1961	21,366	+78.2%
1971	36,677	+71.7%
1981	49,428	+34.8%
1991	71,181	+44.0%
2001	86,543	+21.6%
2006	97,475	+12.6%
2011	98,780	+1.3%
2016	104,986	+6.3%
2021	121,436	+15.7%
Source: Census of Population

As of the 2021 Canadian census conducted by Statistics Canada, Waterloo has a population of 121,436, a change of 15.7% from its 2016 population of 104,986. With a land area of 64.06 km^{2} (24.73 sq mi), the city has a population density of 1,895.7/km^{2} (4,909.7/sq mi). As of 2021, the median age is 36.0 years old, as compared to 37.7 in 2016. Waterloo's median age is 13% lower than Ontario's median age, which is 41.6 years old.

At the census metropolitan area (CMA) level in the 2021 census, the Kitchener–Cambridge–Waterloo CMA had a population of 575,847 living in 219,060 of its 229,809 total private dwellings, a change of 9.9% from its 2016 population of 523,894. With a land area of 1,092.33 km^{2} (421.75 sq mi), it had a population density of 527.2/km^{2} (1,365.4/sq mi) in 2021.

=== Ethnicity ===
The most common ethnic or cultural origins reported in Waterloo in 2021 were German (17.9%), English (17.0%), Scottish (14.6%), Irish (14.3%), Canadian (10.2%), Chinese (8.9%), Indian (6.4%), French (6.0%), British Isles (4.1%), Polish (4.1%), Dutch (3.9%), Italian (3.3%), and Ukrainian (2.4%). Indigenous people made up 1.3% of the population, mostly First Nations (0.7%) and Métis (0.5%). Ethnocultural backgrounds in the city included European (63.7%), South Asian (10.7%), Chinese (9.2%), Black (3.1%), Arab (2.7%), Latin American (1.9%), West Asian (1.7%), Southeast Asian (1.4%), Korean (1.4), and Filipino (1.0%).

Panethnic groups in the City of Waterloo (2001−2021)
Panethnic group	2021		2016		2011		2006		2001	
Panethnic group	Pop.	%	Pop.	%	Pop.	%	Pop.	%	Pop.	%
European (Note: Statistic includes all persons that did not make up part of a visible minority or an indigenous identity.)	75,340	63.64%	74,905	72.45%	76,445	78.73%	79,625	82.28%	73,950	85.91%
East Asian (Note: Statistic includes total responses of "Chinese", "Korean", and "Japanese" under visible minority section on census.)	13,035	11.01%	10,960	10.6%	7,615	7.84%	6,295	6.5%	3,670	4.26%
South Asian	12,680	10.71%	6,650	6.43%	5,145	5.3%	4,495	4.64%	3,695	4.29%
Middle Eastern (Note: Statistic includes total responses of "West Asian" and "Arab" under visible minority section on census.)	5,160	4.36%	3,020	2.92%	2,580	2.66%	1,490	1.54%	980	1.14%
African	3,660	3.09%	1,990	1.92%	1,425	1.47%	1,145	1.18%	1,395	1.62%
Southeast Asian (Note: Statistic includes total responses of "Filipino" and "Southeast Asian" under visible minority section on census.)	2,810	2.37%	1,730	1.67%	1,355	1.4%	1,305	1.35%	680	0.79%
Latin American	2,250	1.9%	1,405	1.36%	1,050	1.08%	860	0.89%	630	0.73%
Indigenous	1,585	1.34%	1,220	1.18%	825	0.85%	755	0.78%	510	0.59%
Other (Note: Statistic includes total responses of "Visible minority, n.i.e." and "Multiple visible minorities" under visible minority section on census.)	1,865	1.58%	1,515	1.47%	655	0.67%	800	0.83%	575	0.67%
Total responses	118,390	97.49%	103,390	98.48%	97,100	98.3%	96,775	99.28%	86,080	99.47%
Total population	121,436	100%	104,986	100%	98,780	100%	97,475	100%	86,543	100%

- Note: Totals greater than 100% due to multiple origin responses.

=== Religion ===
In 2021, 45.8% of the population identified as Christian, with Catholics (17.9%) making up the largest denomination, followed by United Church (3.3%), Lutheran (3.2%), Anglican (2.8%), Orthodox (2.4%), and other denominations. 37.7% of the population reported no religious affiliation. Others identified as Muslim (8.1%), Hindu (4.7%), Sikh (1.2%), Buddhist (1.1%), and with other religions.

=== Language ===
English was the mother tongue of 64.6% of the population in 2021. This was followed by Mandarin (6.2%), Arabic (2.2%), German (1.5%), Spanish (1.5%), Hindi (1.3%), Punjabi (1.2%), Korean (1.1%), Iranian Persian (1.0%), Urdu (1.0%), Serbo-Croatian (1.0%), Cantonese (0.9%), and French (0.9%). Of the official languages, 98.2% of the population reported knowing English and 8.8% French.

== Economy ==
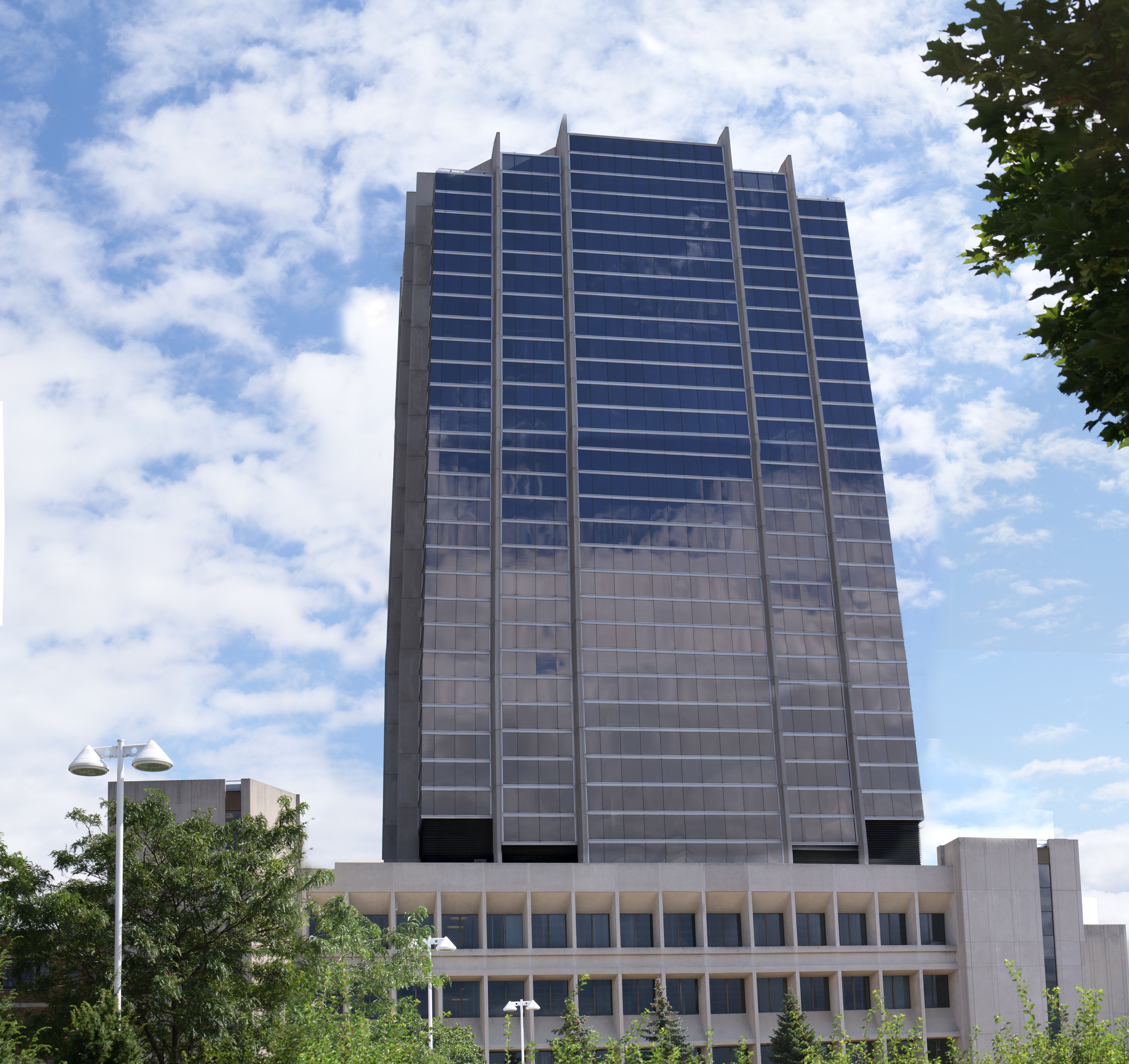
The Sun Life Financial building is currently the tallest building in Waterloo.

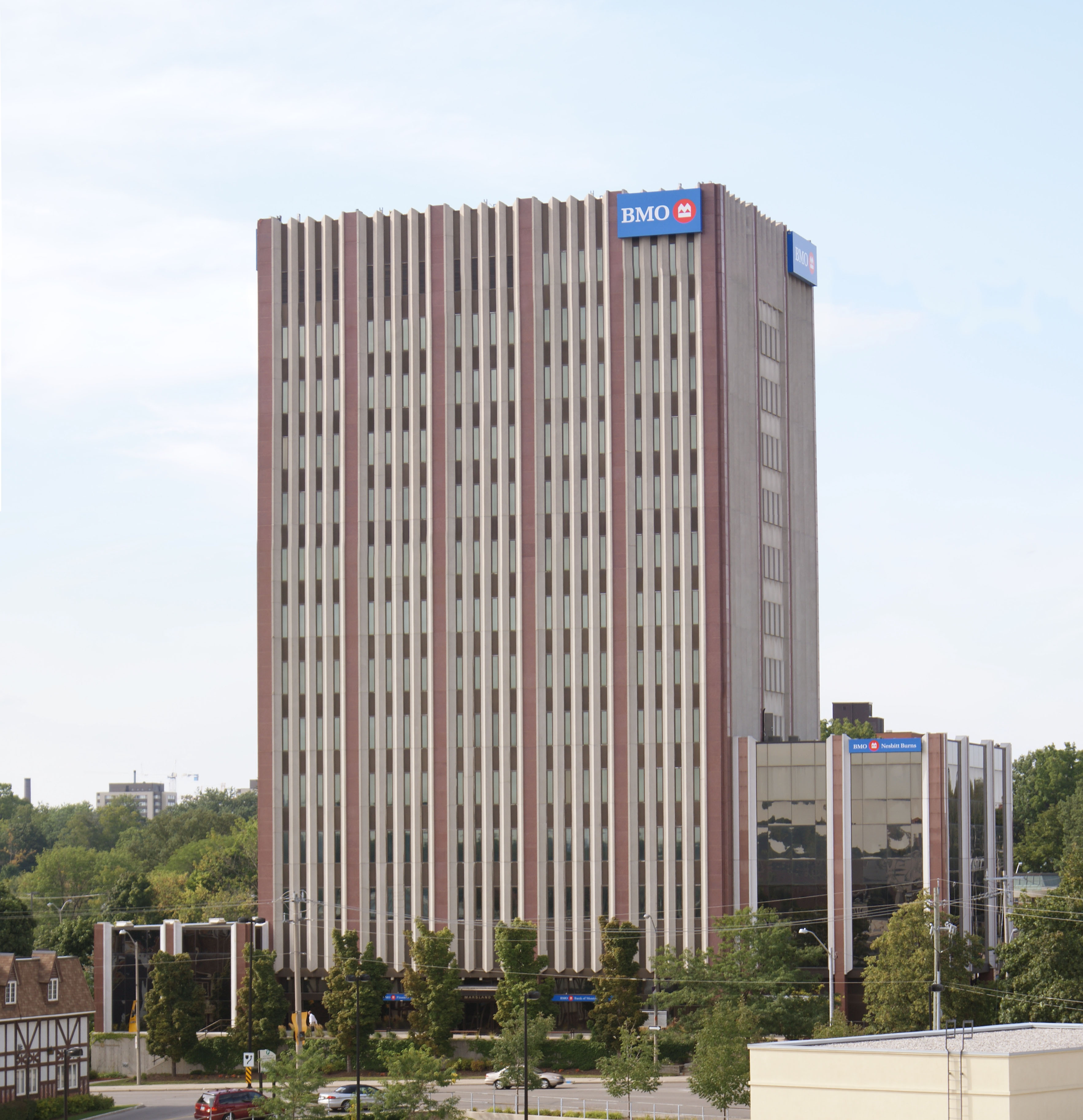
The Marsland Centre in Uptown Waterloo

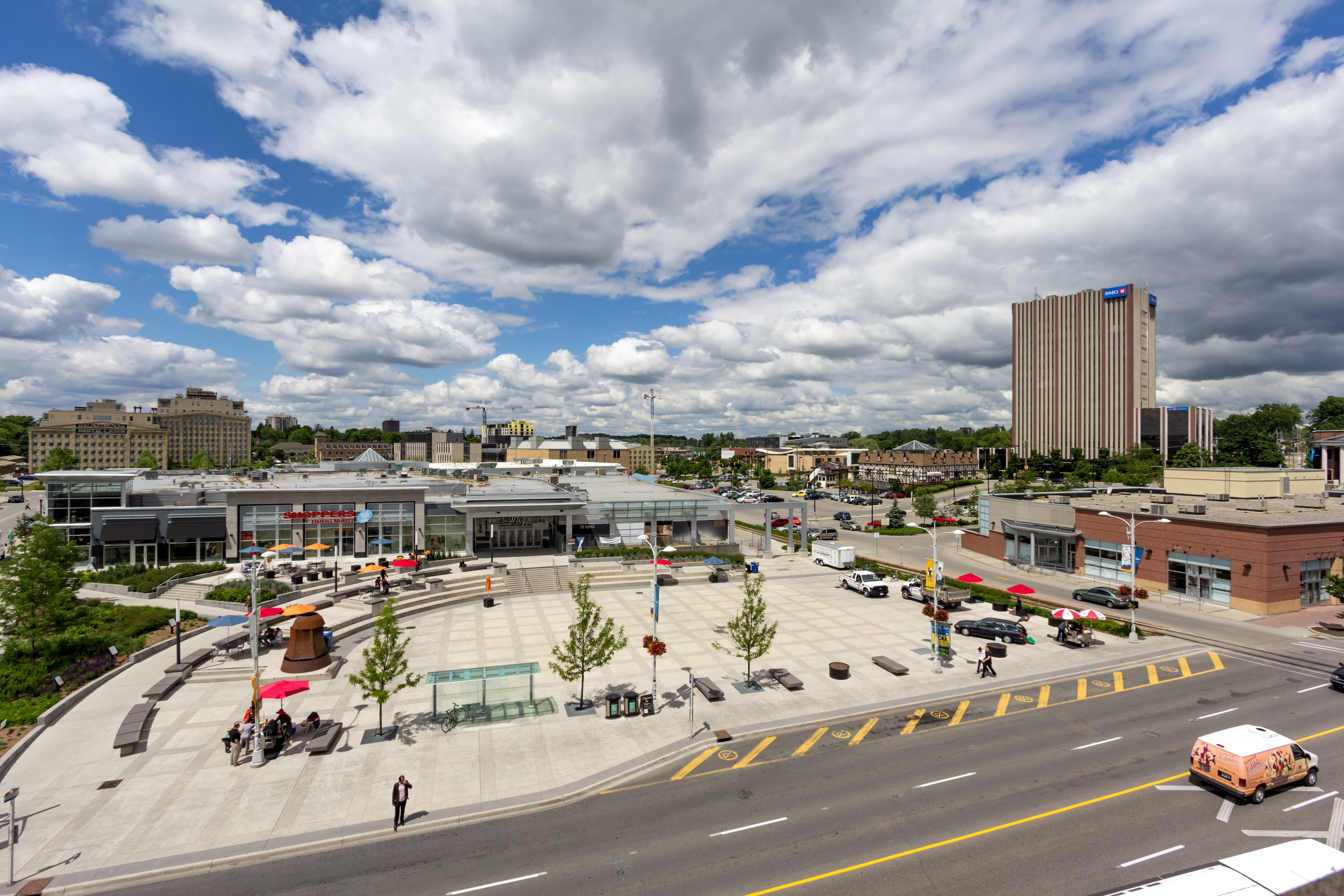
View from the parkade in Uptown Waterloo

According to the 2016 Canadian Census, Waterloo has a median household income (after tax) of $72,239. This is significantly higher than the national median of $61,348. The unemployment rate in Waterloo (6.9%) is lower than the national rate of 7.7%. The median value of a dwelling in Waterloo ($399,997) is higher than the national median of $341,556. The Intelligent Community Forum named Waterloo the Top Intelligent Community of 2007.

Waterloo has a strong knowledge and service-based economy with significant insurance and high-tech sectors as well as two universities. The city's largest employers are Sun Life Financial, the University of Waterloo, Manulife Financial, BlackBerry, Sandvine and Wilfrid Laurier University.

=== Insurance ===
Before it became known for technology, Waterloo was sometimes referred to as "the Hartford of Canada" because of the many insurance companies based in the area. Insurance companies founded in Waterloo include:

- Waterloo Mutual Insurance (1863) – acquired by Economical Insurance in 1980
- North Waterloo Farmers Mutual Insurance (1874) – merged with Oxford Mutual in 2016 to form Heartland Farm Mutual
- Mutual Life Assurance (1868) – acquired by Sun Life in 2002
- Mercantile Fire Insurance (1875) – acquired by London and Lancashire in 1896 and moved to Toronto
- Dominion Life Assurance (1889) – acquired by Manulife in 1985
- Equitable Life Insurance (1920)
- Merchants Casualty Insurance Company (1924) – acquired by Economical Insurance in 1936
- Pilot Automobile and Accident Insurance (1927) – now a subsidiary of Aviva Canada
- Canada Health and Accident Assurance Corporation (1945) – merged into CNA Assurance in 1972

=== Technology ===
The city is part of Canada's Technology Triangle (CTT), a joint economic development initiative of Waterloo, Kitchener, Cambridge and the Region of Waterloo that markets the region internationally. Despite its name, CTT does not focus exclusively on promoting technology industries, but on all aspects of economic development.

Waterloo has a strong technology sector with hundreds of high-tech firms. The dominant technology company in the city is BlackBerry, makers of the BlackBerry, which has its headquarters in the city and owns several office buildings near the University of Waterloo's main campus.

Notable Waterloo-based high-tech companies include:

- Aeryon Labs
- BlackBerry
- Dalsa
- Descartes Systems Group
- Google (in neighbouring Kitchener)
- Kik Messenger (in neighbouring Kitchener)
- Maplesoft
- MKS Inc.
- ON Semiconductor
- OpenText Corporation
- Sandvine

Many other high-tech companies, with headquarters elsewhere, take advantage of the concentration of high-tech employees in the Waterloo area, and have research and development centres there. Shopify, SAP, Google, Oracle, Intel, McAfee, NCR Corporation, Electronic Arts and Agfa are among the large, international technology companies with development offices in Waterloo.

=== Education and research ===
Waterloo is home to two major universities, the University of Waterloo and Wilfrid Laurier University.

The city is also home to three well-known think tanks – the Perimeter Institute for Theoretical Physics, an advanced centre for the study of foundational, theoretical physics and award-winning educational outreach in science; the Institute for Quantum Computing, based at the University of Waterloo, which carries out innovative research in the computer, engineering, mathematical and physical sciences; and the Centre for International Governance Innovation, an independent, nonpartisan think tank that addresses international governance challenges.

=== Distilling and brewing ===
Breweries and distilleries had been a significant industry in the Waterloo area until 1993 when a Labatt-owned brewery was shut down. The Brick Brewing Company operated in Waterloo but is now based in Kitchener. Waterloo was the original home of distiller Seagram (also the home town of many descendants of J.P. Seagram), which closed its Waterloo plant in 1992. Of the remaining Seagram buildings, one became home of the Centre for International Governance Innovation (CIGI), while others were converted into condominiums.

=== Other ===
One of the city's oldest businesses is the Waterloo Manufacturing Company, which was incorporated in 1888 and has origins in 1850. The city encourages location filming of movies and TV series and many have taken advantage of Waterloo locations. Examples include Downsizing (released in 2017), The Demolisher (2015) and Degrassi: The Next Generation (2015).

== Arts and culture ==
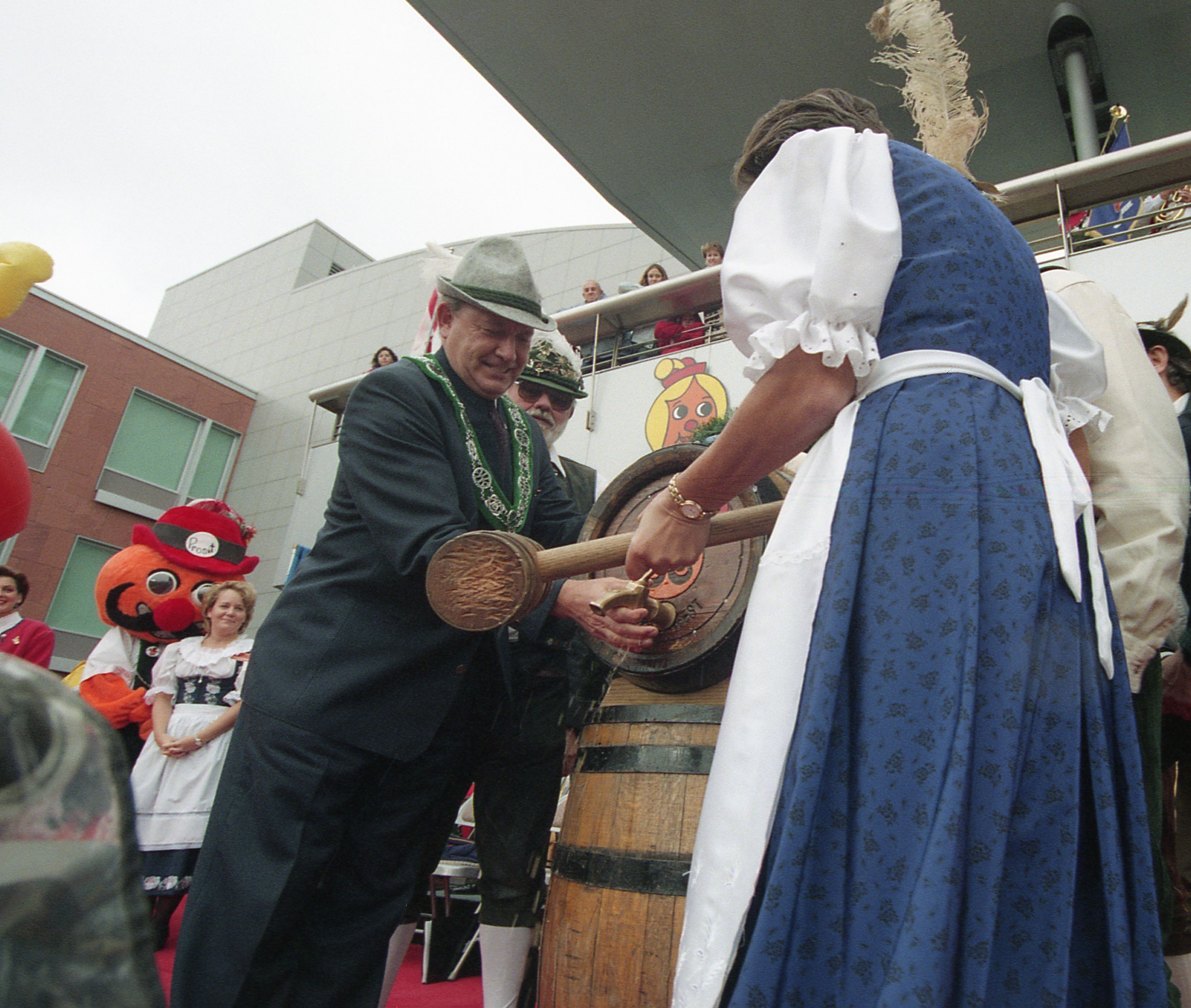
Elizabeth Witmer taps a keg to begin 1996's KW Oktoberfest.

Kitchener–Waterloo Oktoberfest is a nine-day Oktoberfest celebration held in both Kitchener and Waterloo. It is the second largest Oktoberfest celebration in the world, and the largest outside of Germany. In 2013, CBC reported that the festival receives over 700,000 annual visitors, has 1,780 volunteers, was broadcast to 1.8 million national television viewers, and generated an estimated $21 million of economic activity. Tri-Pride is a non-profit LGBT pride festival held annually during Pride Month in the "tri-cities" of Cambridge, Kitchener and Waterloo.

The Kitchener–Waterloo Symphony is located in Kitchener. According to their website, they perform over 222 concerts annually to an audience of over 90,000, both in the concert hall and across the Waterloo Region. The Waterloo Busker Carnival is a busking festival held annually in August in Waterloo public square. Admission is free, and the festival has been operating since 1989. The Rainbow Reels Queer and Trans Film Festival is an annual LBGT film festival which screens at Princess Twin Cinemas in Uptown Waterloo.

=== Inactive or past ===
The Waterloo Festival for Animated Cinema was an annual film festival dedicated to feature-length animation films. It was held from 2001 to 2013. The International Olympiad in Informatics, a competitive programming competition for secondary school students, was held in Waterloo in 2010.

=== Attractions ===
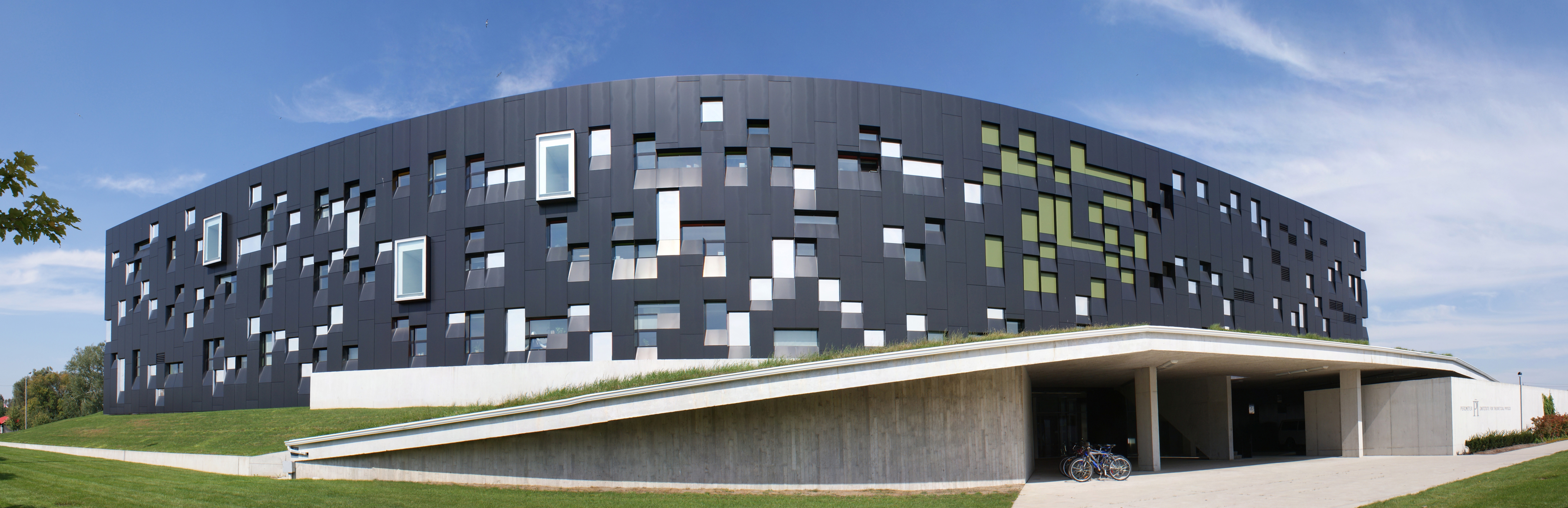
Perimeter Institute in Uptown

Waterloo's local tourist attractions and areas of interest include: the Canadian Clay and Glass Gallery, the Waterloo Central Railway, the City of Waterloo Museum, a statue of monkeys entitled "Banana", the Perimeter Institute for Theoretical Physics, the St. Jacobs Farmers' Market (although the market is just outside city limits), University of Waterloo's Earth Sciences Museum, and Conestoga Mall.

== Recreation ==
External interactive map
- An interactive map created by the city, depicting the city's recreation facilities. Index: parks are outlined in thin green, outdoor skating rinks are cyan markers, cycling infrastructure are thick lines and trails are thick blue lines

Waterloo's parks and recreation facilities mainly comprise Waterloo Park, Bechtel Park, Laurel Creek Conservation Area, the Waterloo Memorial Recreation Complex, RIM Park, and over 150 kilometres (93 mi) of mixed-use trails.

=== Parks ===
Created in 1890, 45-hectare (110-acre) Waterloo Park is an urban park in Uptown Waterloo which includes an animal farm, sports fields, and a splash pad. It is the oldest park in the city; the mixed-use Laurel Trail and the rapid transit Ion line both run through the park. 44-hectare (110-acre) Bechtel Park is located in eastern Waterloo, and houses a dog park, three soccer fields, a field house, and more. Laurel Creek Conservation Area is in western Waterloo—north-west of University of Waterloo's Environmental Reserve—and houses 122 campsites, 4.5 kilometres (2.8 mi) of trails, and facilities for canoeing, swimming, windsurfing, cycling, and sailing.

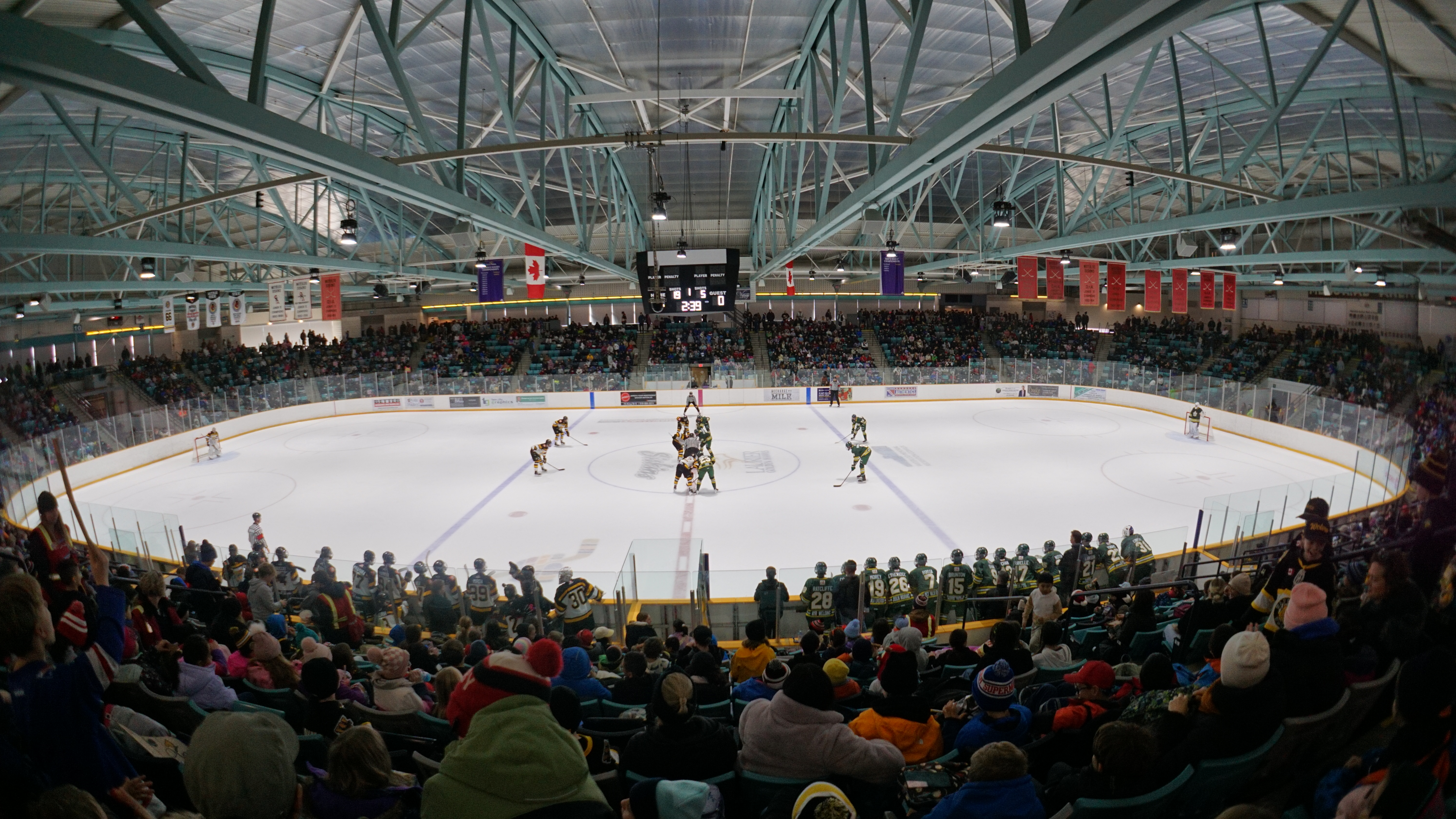
The Waterloo Memorial Recreation Complex

The Waterloo Memorial Recreation Complex, then described as the "largest and most expensive project in the city's history", opened in 1993. It includes an arena seating 3,500, swimming and banquet facilities, and an indoor track. 123-hectare (300-acre) RIM Park, originally called Millennium Park, opened in September 2001. Its features include outdoor soccer fields, ice rinks, baseball diamonds, basketball courts, meeting rooms and more. RIM Park is in proximity to the Walter Bean Grand River Trail, Grey Silo Golf Course, and Waterloo Public Library's Eastside Branch. There are a number of small playgrounds, woodlots, and recreation facilities around Waterloo which are not mentioned above due to their size.

=== Mixed-use trails ===
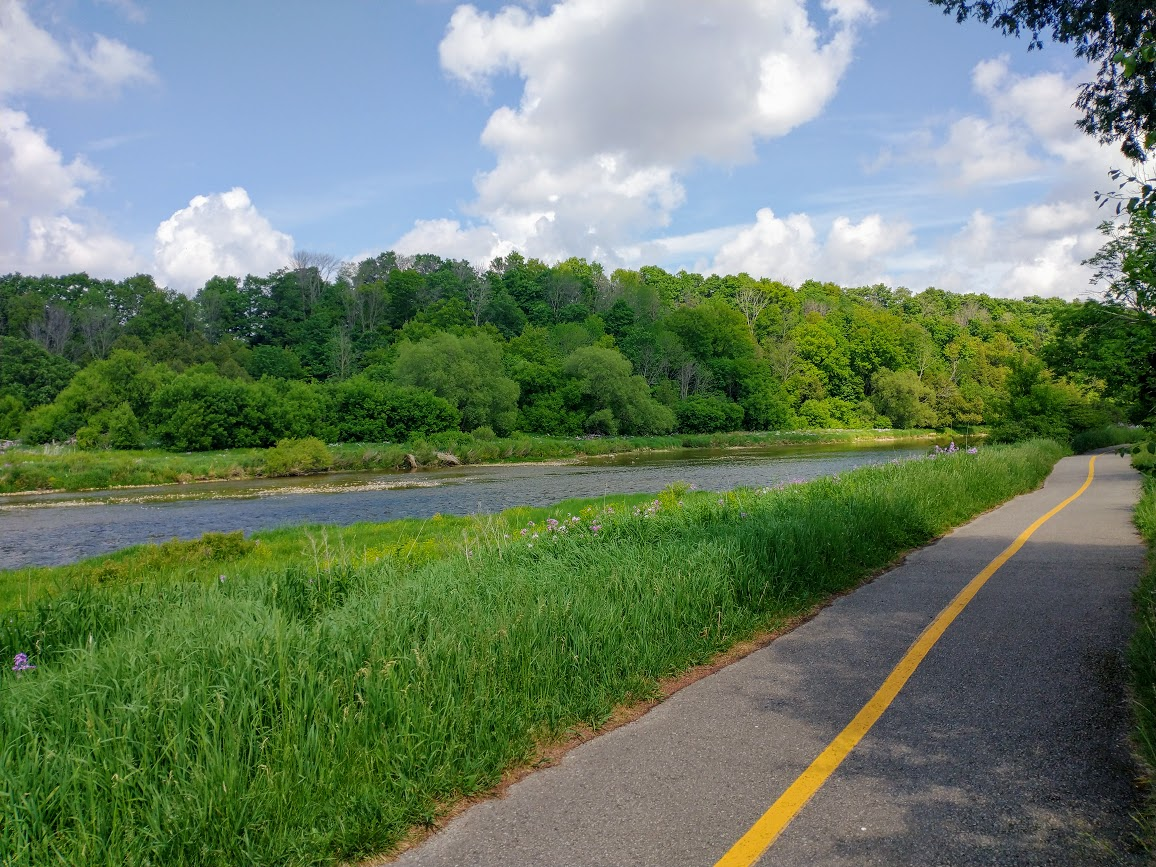
The Walter Bean Grand River Trail, with the Grand River seen in the background

Trails for walking, hiking, and biking play an important part in Waterloo's recreational infrastructure. Waterloo had 150 kilometres (93 mi) of trails by 2007, as compared to 10 kilometres (6.2 mi) of trails in 1987. The 5-kilometre (3.1 mi) Iron Horse Trail, connecting Waterloo and Kitchener, opened in 1997. Then-mayor Joan McKinnon brought upon the connection of the Trans Canada Trail into the Waterloo Region, which ran from the Iron Horse Trail to Waterloo's northern boundary.

The 76-kilometre (47 mi) Walter Bean Grand River Trail, announced in 1999, served to create an accessible trail along the Grand River. Waterloo: An Illustrated History, 1857–2007 states, "[the trail] was particularly needed in Waterloo as the river's geographic location on the edge of the city meant that, unlike so many other Canadian cities, the river had not historically played a central role in the community."

=== Sports ===
In July 2002, Waterloo, along with Kitchener, hosted the Ontario Summer Games. From July 30 to August 2, 2026, Waterloo, Kitchener, and Cambridge co-hosted the 2026 Ontario Summer Games. The following sports teams are based in Waterloo: Waterloo Wildfire (National Ringette League), Waterloo Siskins (Greater Ontario Junior Hockey League), Waterloo United (League One Ontario), Wilfrid Laurier Golden Hawks, and Waterloo Warriors.

Sports teams of Waterloo
Team	Sport	League	Venue	Established	Disestablished	Championships
Kitchener-Waterloo Siskins	Ice hockey	Greater Ontario Junior Hockey League	Waterloo Memorial Recreation Complex	1934		12
K–W United FC	Association football	Premier Development League	University Stadium	2011 (Note: the sports franchise was formed in 2011 and was relocated to Waterloo in 2013)	2017	1
K-W United FC	Women's soccer	USL W-League	University Stadium	2006 (Note: the sports franchise was formed in 2006 and was relocated to Waterloo in 2013)	2014	0
SC Waterloo Region	Association football	Canadian Soccer League	Warrior Field; RIM Park	2011	2020	1
Waterloo Hurricanes	Ice hockey	Ontario Hockey Association Junior A League	Waterloo Memorial Arena	1950	1952	0
Waterloo United	Association football	League1 Ontario	RIM Park	2021		0
Waterloo Wildfire	Women's ringette	National Ringette League		2004		0

== Government ==
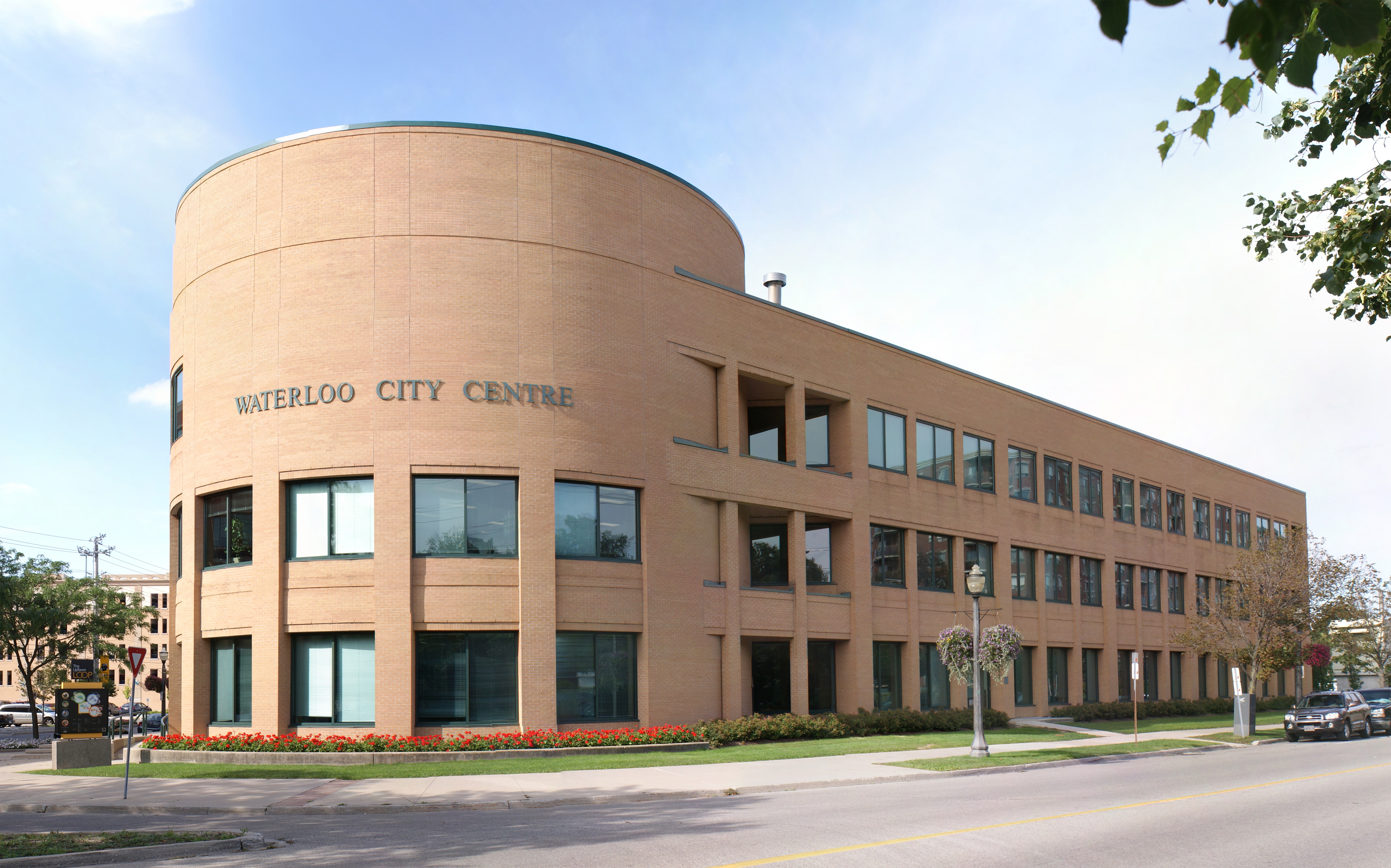
Waterloo City Hall

Waterloo was part of Waterloo County until 1973 when a restructuring created the Regional Municipality of Waterloo, which consists of the cities of Waterloo, Kitchener, and Cambridge, and the townships of Woolwich, Wilmot, Wellesley, and North Dumfries. The Region handles many services, including paramedic services, policing, waste management, recreation, planning, roads and social services. The Waterloo Award, established in 1997, is the highest civic honour a person can receive from the City of Waterloo.

Waterloo City Council consists of a mayor and seven councillors, each representing a ward. The number of wards was increased from five to seven in the November 2006 elections. As of 2022, the mayor of Waterloo is Dorothy McCabe, elected in October 2022. The current Waterloo councillors are as follows, as of 2022, listed by ascending ward number: Sandra Hanmer (Southwest Ward), Royce Bodaly (Northwest Ward), Hans Roach (Lakeshore Ward), Diane Freeman (Northeast Ward), Jen Vasic (Southeast Ward), Mary Lou Roe (Central-Columbia Ward), and Julie Wright (Uptown Ward).

In politics, Waterloo is within the federal electoral district of Waterloo, and within the provincial electoral district also named Waterloo.

Waterloo federal election results
Year	Liberal		Conservative		New Democratic		Green	
2021	46%	25,816	27%	15,521	19%	10,846	3%	1,934
2019	49%	29,922	24%	14,681	15%	9,303	10%	5,928

Waterloo provincial election results
Year	PC		New Democratic		Liberal		Green	
2022	29%	12,414	46%	19,616	14%	5,963	7%	2,954
2018	31%	15,974	51%	26,243	12%	6,328	5%	2,473

== Transportation ==
=== Roads ===
The road system and city limits of Waterloo

The controlled-access Highway 85, part of the larger Conestoga Parkway, is the only provincial highway that runs through Waterloo. To the north, the divided freeway ends at the city limit, and the road becomes Waterloo Regional Road 85, which accesses St. Jacobs and Elmira, before ending in Elmira. To the south, Highway 85 becomes Highway 7 within Kitchener, before diverging into eastbound Highway 8 (to Cambridge, Highway 401 interchange, and Hamilton) and westbound Highway 7/8 (to New Hamburg, Stratford, and Goderich). Highway 85 has 5 interchanges within Waterloo, from north to south, with the regional road number in brackets: King Street (15), Northfield Drive (50), King Street (15), University Avenue (57), and Bridgeport Road (9).

=== Public transport ===
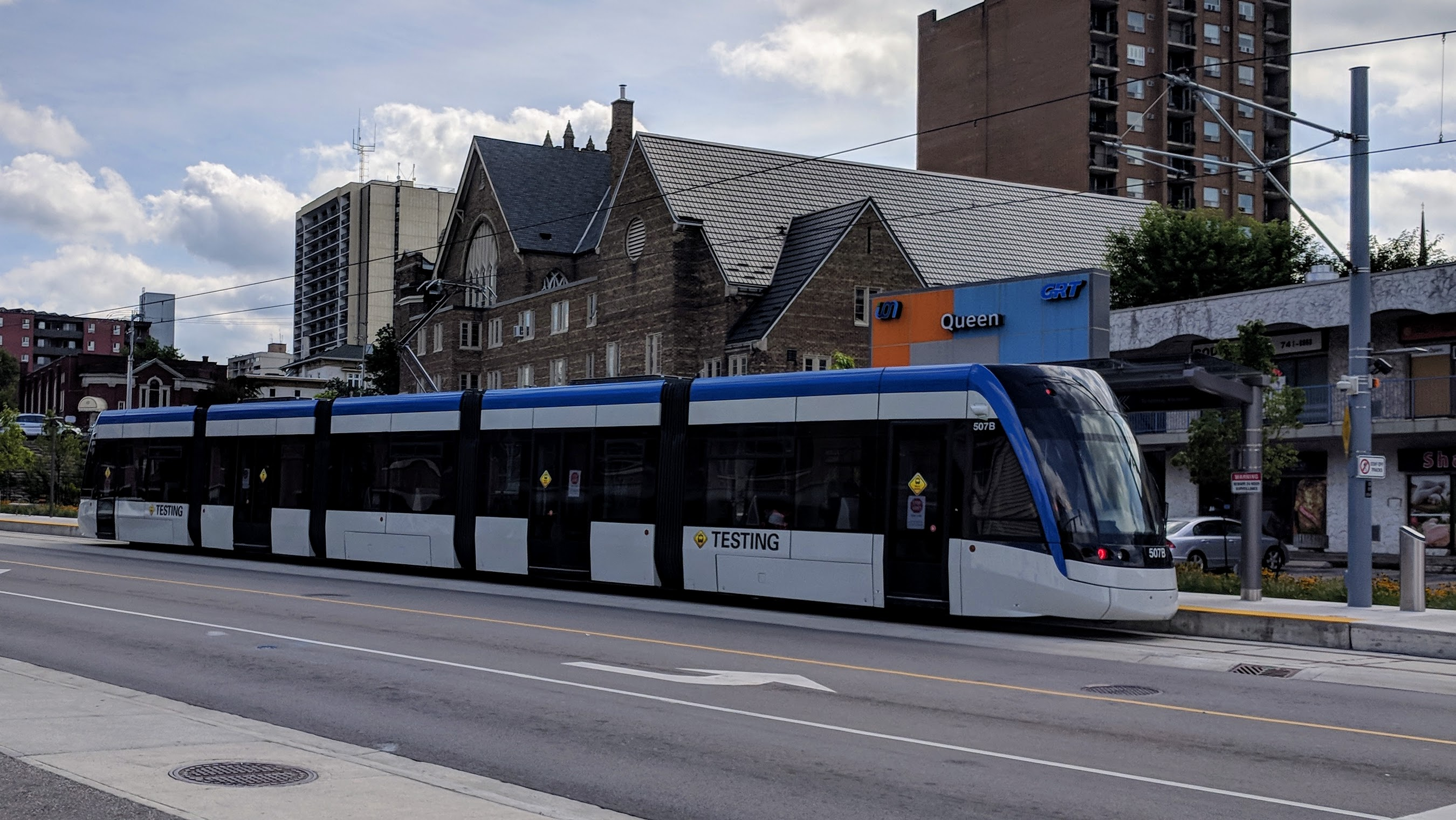
Ion unit 507 at Queen Station in 2018

Public transport throughout the Waterloo Region is provided by Grand River Transit (GRT), which provides service for various bus routes and the Ion rapid transit line. The Ion is a light rail line providing service to 19 stations, from Conestoga station (Conestoga Mall in Waterloo) to Fairway station (Fairview Park Mall in Kitchener). The line connects downtown Kitchener and uptown Waterloo. GRT operates local and IXpress bus routes within the Region of Waterloo.

=== Intercity transit ===
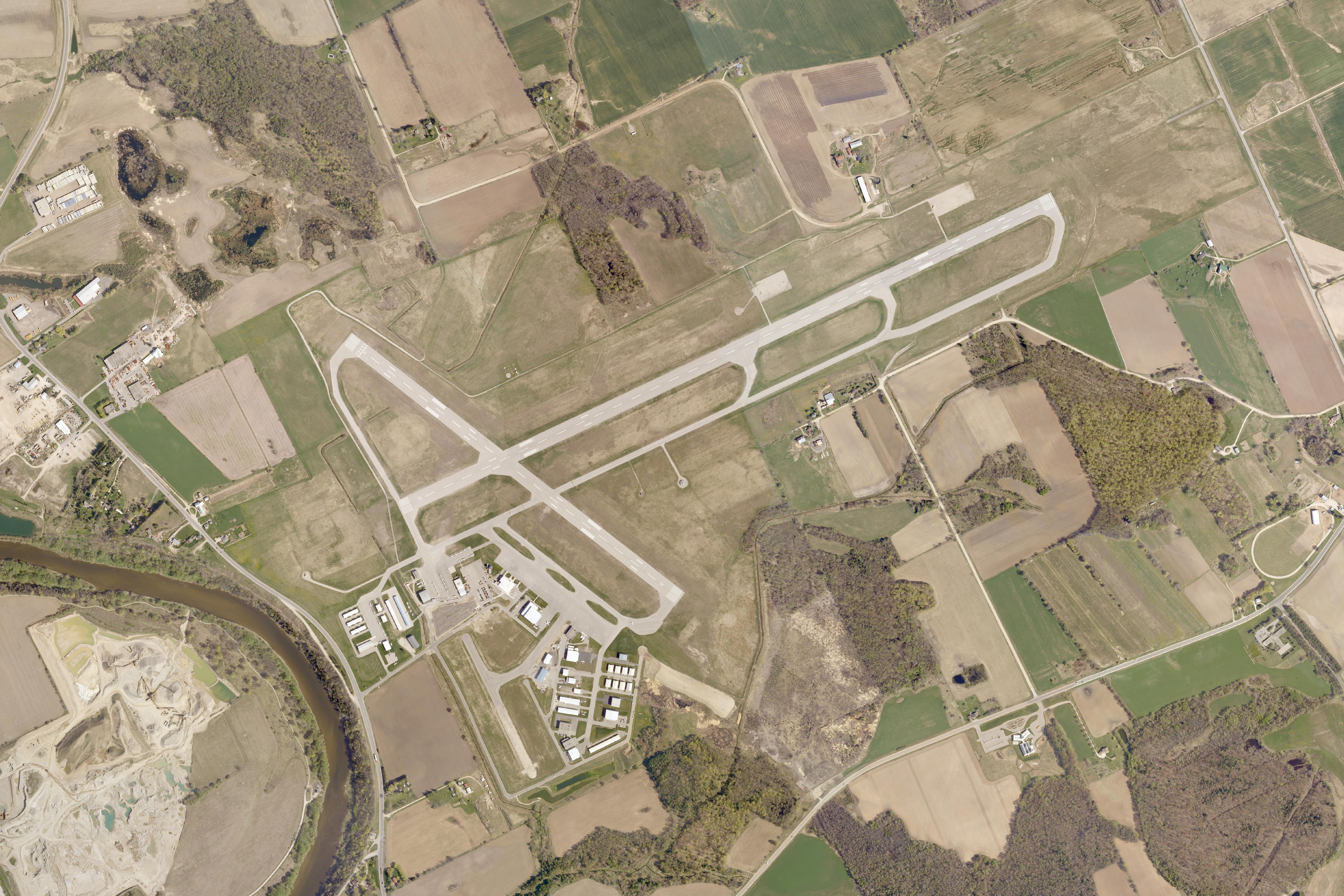
Aerial photograph of the Region of Waterloo International Airport

Waterloo is not currently served by any regularly scheduled passenger rail service. The nearby Kitchener station is accessible from Waterloo through buses or a transfer from Ion's Kitchener Central Station. Kitchener station is serviced by GO Transit's Kitchener line and the Via Rail's The Corridor. On weekdays, the commuter rail GO trains run eastbound (to Toronto) nine times per day, and westbound eight times per day. In November 2025, Metrolinx introduces weekend services on the Kitchener Line with two trains departing in the morning and two trains returning in the evening between Kitchener GO station and Union station in Toronto. Via Rail operates one train per day, both westbound and eastbound, including weekends.

Waterloo is served by GO buses routes 17, 25, and 30, with destinations to Hamilton GO Centre, Square One bus terminal, and Bramalea GO station/Highway 407 bus terminal, respectively, with intermediate stops serving Guelph, University of Guelph, Aldershot GO station, McMaster University, Milton, and Maedowvale Business Centre in Missisauga. GO bus route 30 provides connections between University of Waterloo, Wilfrid Laurier University, Conestoga College Waterloo campus, and Kitchener station.

The non-profit tourist railway Waterloo Central Railway is a revival of the Waterloo-St. Jacobs Railway. It runs between Northfield Ion station and Elmira with stops at St. Jacobs Market, St. Jacobs. The Waterloo Station (located within the vicinity of Waterloo City Hall) continues to operate as a Visitor & Heritage Information Centre.

=== Air ===
The Region of Waterloo International Airport in nearby Breslau serves Waterloo and the surrounding region, although it is not heavily served by scheduled airlines. As of 2026, the Region of Waterloo International Airport has scheduled flights to Calgary, Cancun, Edmonton, Halifax, Punta Cana. Flights are serviced by Flair Airlines, Porter Airlines, Westjet, and other regional airlines. The airport also serves educational and recreational aviation activities.

== Services ==
=== Health care ===
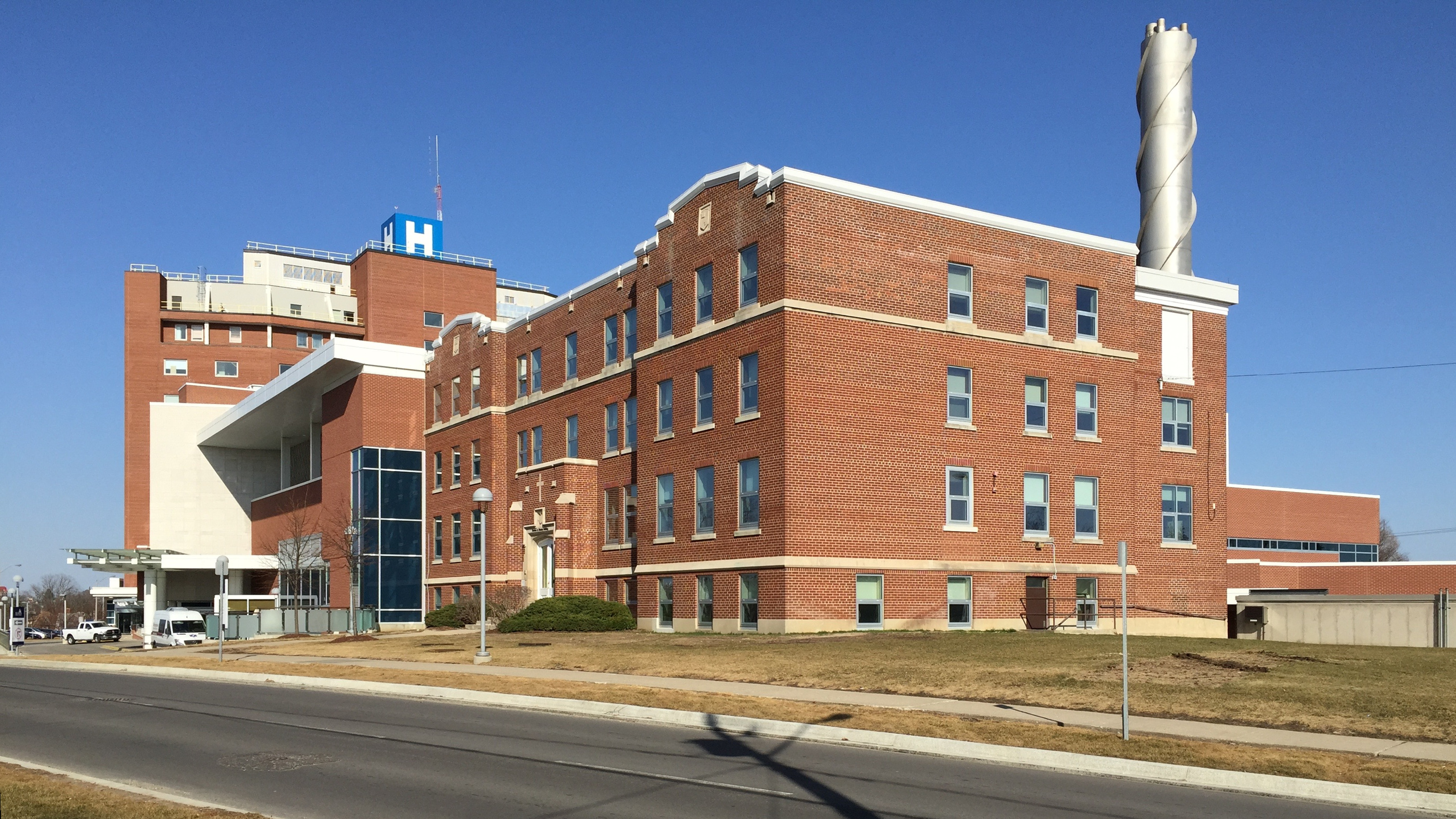
St. Mary's General Hospital

There are no hospitals in Waterloo, but neighbouring Kitchener has Grand River Hospital (which has a secondary site, the Freeport Campus) and St. Mary's General Hospital. Both were ranked highly for safety in a national comparison study in 2017–2018, but would benefit from reduced wait times. Long-term care beds are provided at numerous facilities. Grand River Hospital has a capacity of 574 beds; the Freeport location was merged into it in April 1995. St. Mary's General Hospital is a 150-bed adult acute-care facility and includes the Regional Cardiac Care Centre with two cardiovascular operating rooms, an eight-bed cardiovascular intensive care unit and 45 inpatient beds.

Region of Waterloo Paramedic Services and Waterloo Fire Rescue respond to medical emergencies within the city of Waterloo. Region of Waterloo Paramedic Services may transport patients to either Grand River Hospital or St. Mary's General Hospital emergency departments, depending on proximity, anticipated wait times and the type of emergency.

Family doctors are often in short supply and a source of great concern among residents. Recruiting efforts over the previous 15 years achieved some success as of September 2018, but needed to be continued.

=== Libraries ===
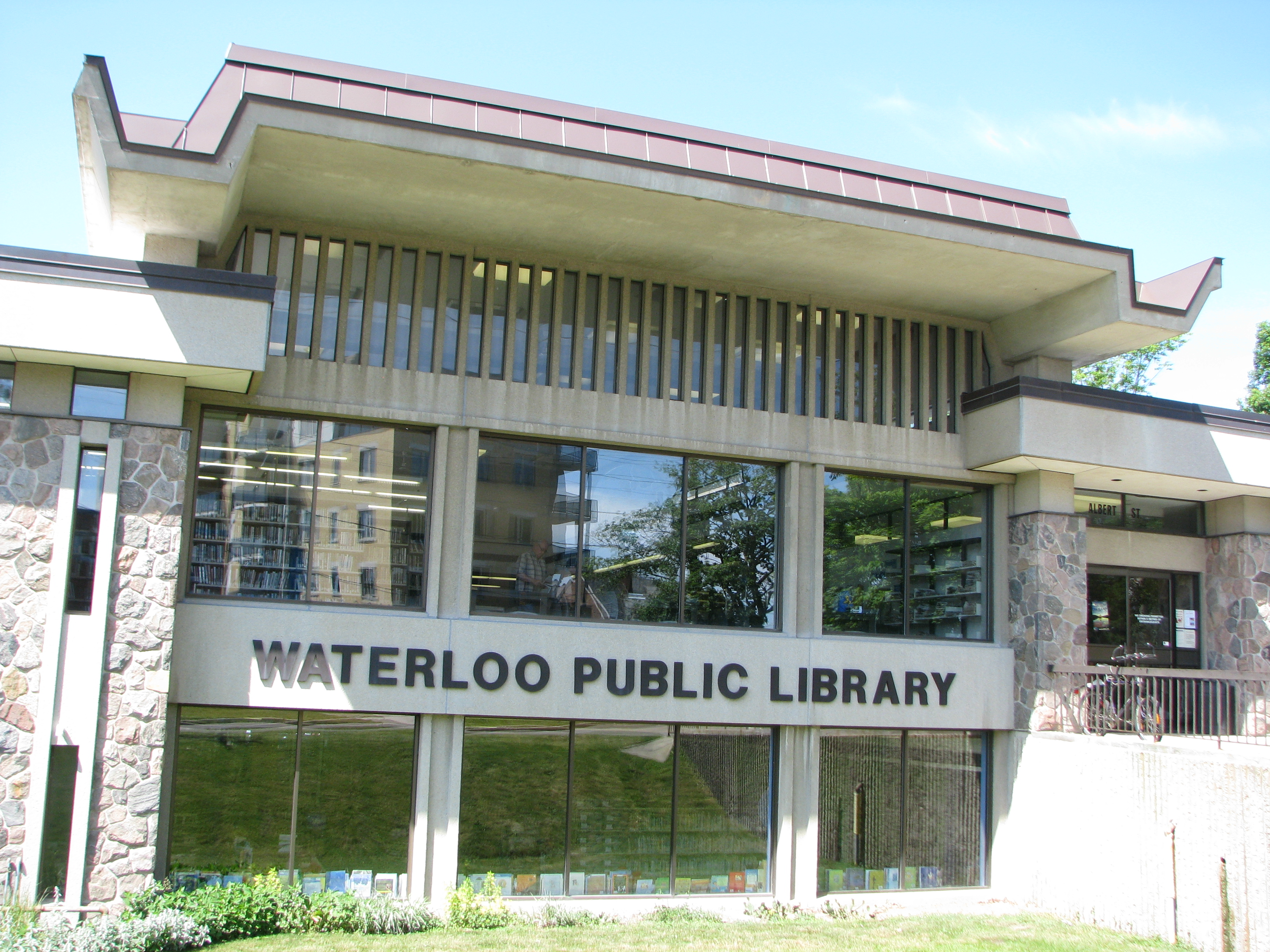
The entrance to Waterloo Public Library's Main Branch in 2002

The Waterloo Public Library was founded in 1888. As of 2022, the library has 4 branches (in order of opening): the Main Branch, the Albert McCormick Branch, the John M. Harper Branch and the Eastside Branch. The Eastside Branch, opened May 7, 2022, is the newest branch built. The $10-million library is built into the existing RIM Park Manulife Sportsplex and has around 35,000 books.

=== Fire protection ===
Fire protection and rescue services are provided by Waterloo Fire Rescue, a service of the City of Waterloo. As of 2020, there are four active fire stations in Waterloo. Waterloo Fire Rescue responds to fires, medical emergencies, car accidents and chemical incidents. (Region of Waterloo Paramedic Services also responds to medical emergencies.) When the two-tier regional government system was implemented in the early 1970s, police service was moved to the regional government, but fire service remained at the local municipality (city or township) level. From time to time, the media and interested parties raise the question of whether this service should remain at the city level, or whether there might be cost savings or service improvements if the various fire services were merged into regional fire service. A 2019 newspaper article stated that "there would likely be no cost savings, but service would improve under [a] regionalized system," in the view of some former fire chiefs.

=== Policing ===
Waterloo Regional Police Service, the seventh-largest police service in the province of Ontario, provides general police service in the city of Waterloo. The Waterloo Regional Police North Division is located at 45 Columbia Street East, Waterloo. Waterloo Regional Police also serve the municipalities of Kitchener and Cambridge and the Townships of Wellesley, Wilmot, Woolwich and North Dumfries. City of Waterloo bylaws controlling matters such as parking, weeds and noise are enforced by city bylaw enforcement officers. The two universities each have special constables who are first responders to all emergencies at their respective university campuses. Special Constables may lay charges and/or make arrests under the same legal authority as police officers. As of 2019, University of Waterloo Police Service had twenty-four Special Constables. Wilfrid Laurier University also has a Special Constable Service. The Ontario Provincial Police patrols provincial highways. Two homicides were reported in the Waterloo Region in 2021, neither of which was in the city of Waterloo.

== Education ==
The Waterloo Region District School Board is the region's public school board. As of 2022, in Waterloo, they run 21 elementary schools (see List of Waterloo Region, Ontario schools) and three secondary schools, which are Bluevale Collegiate Institute, Laurel Heights Secondary School, and Waterloo Collegiate Institute. The Waterloo Catholic District School Board is the region's catholic school board. As of 2022, in Waterloo, they run 8 elementary schools and one secondary school, which is St. David Catholic Secondary School. There are a number of private and other schools not associated with the above boards, but there are no secondary schools in Waterloo unassociated with the boards.

Waterloo is home to the following universities and colleges: the University of Waterloo, Wilfrid Laurier University, St. Jerome's University, St. Paul's University College, Conrad Grebel University College, Renison University College, and Conestoga College (based in Kitchener but has a Waterloo campus). The University of Waterloo is a public research university that saw 37,884 students in 2022. The university has the largest post-secondary co-op program in the world and ranked 151–200 in the world and 7–8 in Canada in the 2021 Academic Ranking of World Universities. Wilfrid Laurier University saw about 20,000 students in 2022, including its campuses in Brantford and Milton.

== Media ==
The Waterloo Region Record is a daily newspaper that covers the Region of Waterloo, while the Waterloo Chronicle covers the city; both are published by Metroland Media Group. There are a number of FM radio stations that reach Waterloo, (see Media in Waterloo Region#Radio) although CKMS-FM is the only to broadcast out of the city. CKGL (570 News) is the only AM radio station broadcasting from the Region. CKCO-DT (CTV Kitchener) is the only television station that broadcasts from the Region.

== Notable people ==
- Walter Bowman (born 1870), First non-British player to play in the English Football League.
- Lorna Geddes (born 1943), ballerina with National Ballet of Canada
- Nate Haller, country musician/singer
- Julie Karn (born 1996), soccer player
- Geoff Ward (born 1962), ice hockey coach
- Darrin MacLeod (born 1994), soccer player and coach

== See also ==
- List of cities in Ontario
