= Eramosa River Trail =

Urban walking trail in Guelph, Ontario, Canada

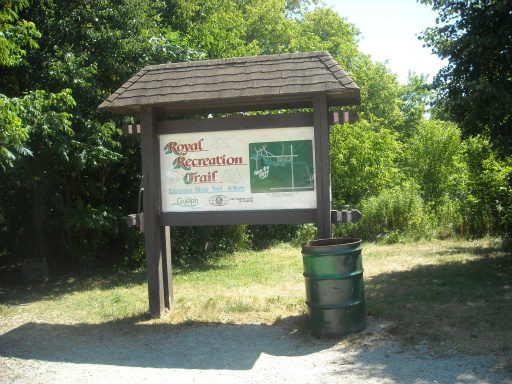
The trail information sign at the beginning of the Eramosa River Trail

The Eramosa River Trail is a 4.1 km (2.5 mi) urban walking trail that runs alongside the Eramosa River in Guelph, Ontario, Canada, stretching from the Gordon Street covered bridge east to Stone Road. It is considered a section of the Royal Recreational Trail, and meets up with the Downtown and Speed River sections of that trail system at its western terminus.

== Landmarks ==
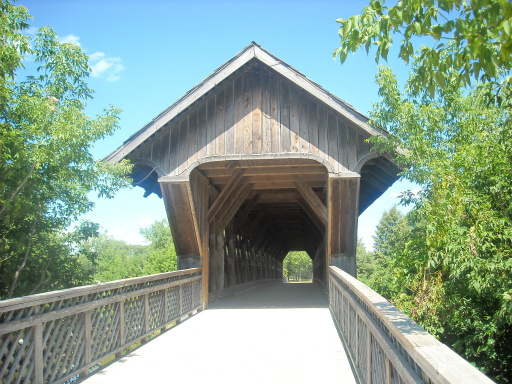
The Lattice Covered Bridge at the York Road and Gordon Street trailhead

The Eramosa River Trail passes through many landmarks throughout the city of Guelph.

=== Covered bridge ===
The well-known Lattice Covered Bridge is a wooden covered bridge located at the start of the Eramosa River Trail near the Guelph Lawn Bowling Club in central Guelph, and serves as a pedestrian and cyclist crossing for the Speed River. It was erected on June 1, 1992 with the help of 400 volunteers, all of whom were members of the Timber Framers Guild. The bridge was constructed using building designs from the 1800s, and is one of only two lattice-covered bridges in Ontario.

=== Parks and rivers ===
The trail runs through or near many parks within the city. These include York Road Park, and Eramosa River Park, and runs near the Royal City Jaycees Bicentennial Park. The trail runs adjacent to the scenic Eramosa River, and ends at the Speed River.

== Terrain ==
The Eramosa River Trail can be considered to have two segments. The western portion follows the northern bank of the Eramosa River, and runs from the Lattice Covered Bridge to Victoria Road, spanning roughly 2.3 km (1.4 mi). This section is wide and flat, and surfaced with crushed stone dust, which makes it an easy, level walking or running trail. The western portion of the trail is wheelchair accessible between Lawrence Avenue and the intersection of York Road and Gordon Street.

At Victoria Road, a road bridge allows access to the eastern section of the trail, which follows the south bank of the Eramosa River. This section is approximately 1.8 km (1.1 mi) in length, and runs from Victoria Road east to Stone Road. The trail here is a natural path, and is narrower and more overgrown than the stone dust trail. It provides a less even, more challenging trail surface.

The eastern portion of the trail has been proposed as a formal extension of the Eramosa River Trail section of the Royal Recreational Trail, but this proposal has not yet been put into action.

== Parks and events ==
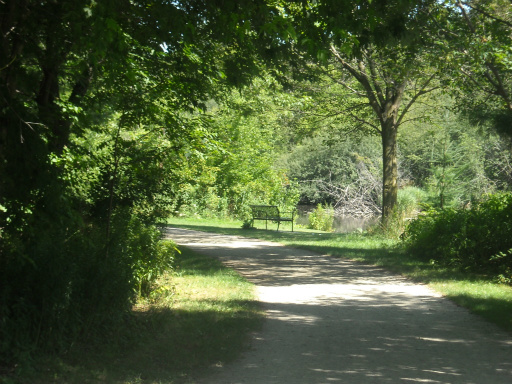
A shady stretch of the Eramosa River Trail, along the river

The Eramosa River trail passes through parts of three parks: York Road Park, Eramosa River Park, and Lyon Park. Each has different features and therefore are used by different organizations in Guelph and the surrounding areas.

The parks are also used for charity events, including walks to raise money for cancer research. The local army reserve uses some of the parks for training areas and battlefield fitness tests.

These parks are also a popular place to take photos. The Guelph photography club has a collection of photos from the parks as well as along the Eramosa trail.

This area has a rich history which leads to historical walking tours.

=== York Road Park ===
Features:

- Hardball
- Softball
- Soccer

=== Eramosa River Park ===
Features:

- Volleyball
- Hardball
- Play area
- Leash-free zone
- Shaded area

=== Lyon Park ===
Features:

- Outdoor ice rink
- Outdoor swimming pool (June 30 – September 5)
- Soft ball
- Mini soccer
- Play area
