= Guelph/Eramosa =

- Township (Lower-tier)
- Township of Guelph/Eramosa
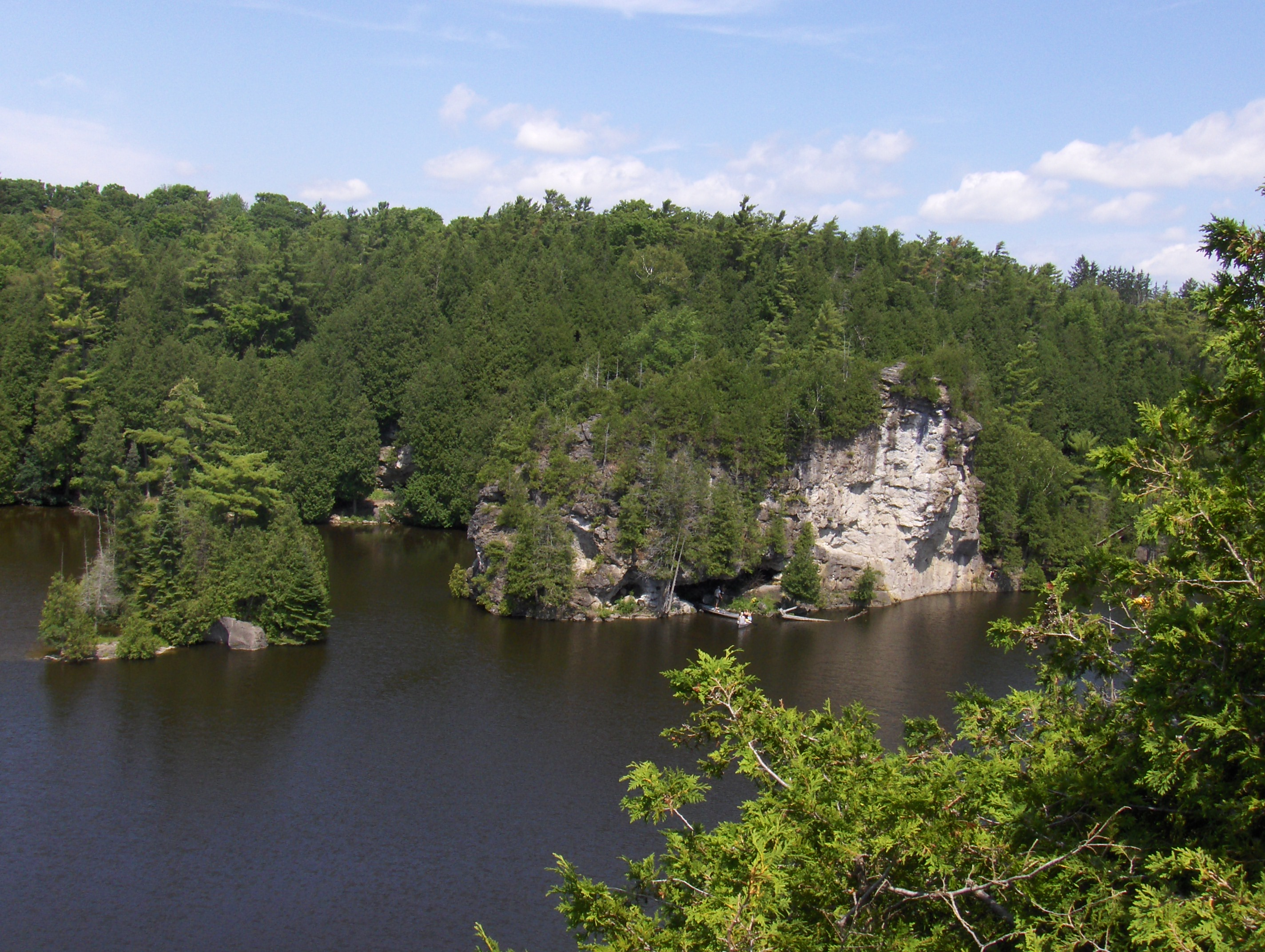
- Rockwood Conservation Area

- Location within Wellington County Location within Southern Ontario
- Coordinates: 43°38′N 80°13′W
- Country: Canada
- Province: Ontario
- County: Wellington
- Established: 1999

Government
  - Type: Township
  - Mayor: Christopher White
  - Governing Body: Township of Guelph/Eramosa Council
  - MP: Mike Chong (Con)
  - MPP: Ted Arnott (PC)

Area
  - Land: 291.67 km^{2} (112.61 sq mi)

Population (2016)
  - Total: 12,854
  - Density: 44.1/km^{2} (114/sq mi)
- Time zone: UTC-5 (EST)
  - Summer (DST): UTC-4 (EDT)
- Postal code span: N0B
- Area codes: 519, 226, and 548
- Highways: Highway 7
- Website: www.get.on.ca

Guelph/Eramosa (/ˈɡwɛlfˈɛrəˈmɒsə/) is a township located in Wellington County, in midwestern Ontario, Canada. It partly encircles the city of Guelph, surrounding it in a continuous arc from approximately northeast to south-southwest of the city. It is part of the Guelph census metropolitan area.

== History ==
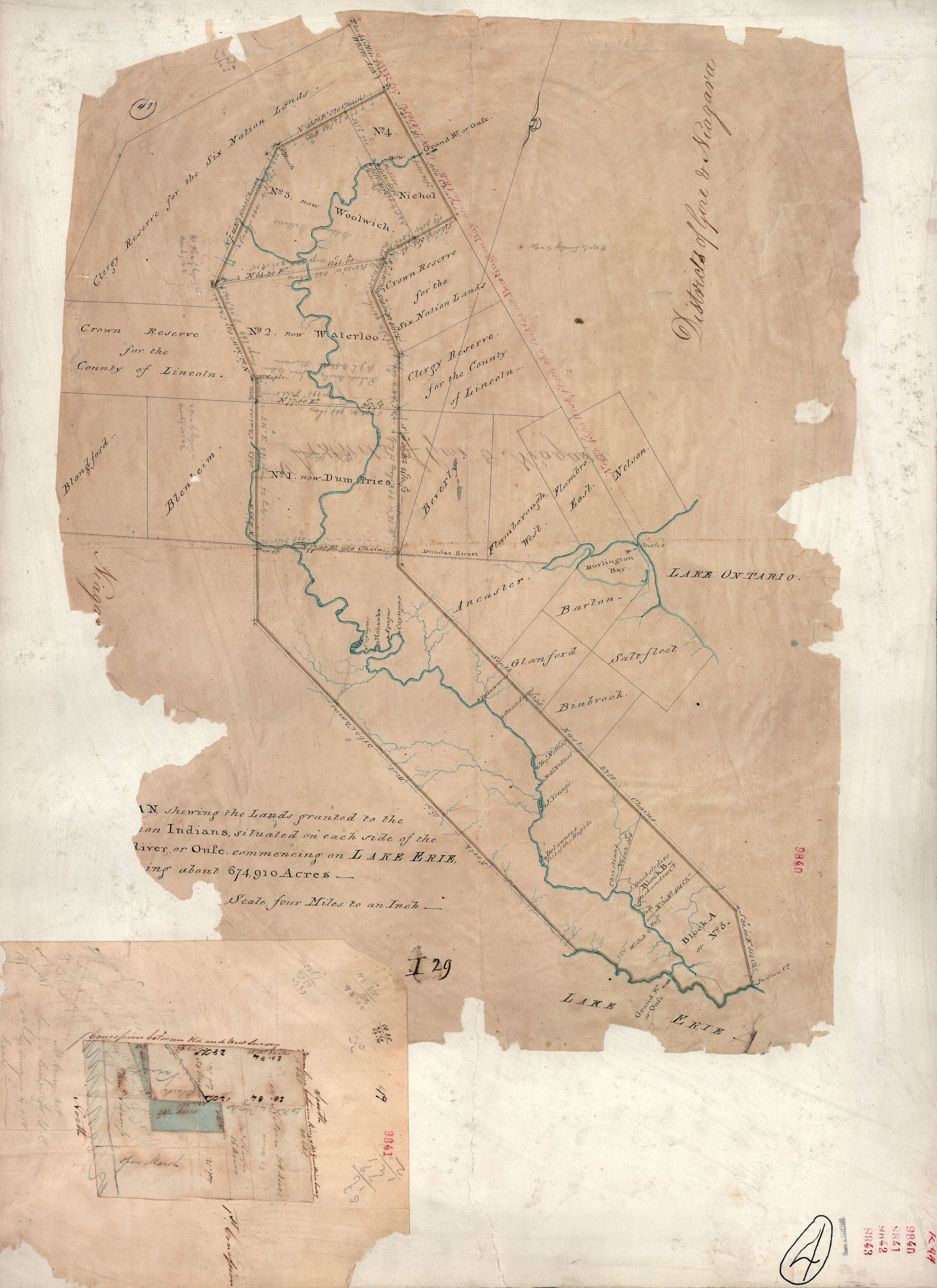
Thomas Ridout survey of 1821. The crown reserve designated for the Six Nation Lands was later constituted as the Township of Guelph.

Guelph Township was first settled in 1825, and Eramosa in 1821. They were constituted respectively from lands originally granted to the Six Nations, and from land purchased from the Mississauga Indians. In 1827, the Canada Company was instrumental in resettling the La Guayrans, a group of Scottish emigrants who had originally gone to Venezuela, onto land in Guelph township. In Eramosa, subsequent settlement focused on the new community of Brotherstown, later renamed as Rockwood.

The township was created in 1999 by the merger of the townships of Guelph and Eramosa, as well as parts of Pilkington and Nichol townships. The name Eramosa was derived from the native word Un-ne-mo-sah (possibly meaning "black dog", "dead dog", or simply "dog").

Eramosa Township was settled primarily by Scots and Irish; in 1841, its population was 935.

The mayor of Guelph/Eramosa in 2022 is Christopher White (who was first elected in 2010). Township councillors are Bruce Dickieson, Corey Woods, Steven Liebig, and Mark Bouwmeester. County councillors are Don McKay and Doug Breen.

Auto parts manufacturer Linamar was started in the village of Ariss in 1964 by Hungarian refugee Frank Hasenfratz, initially in his basement. The company, with a staff of five, was incorporated in 1966 as Linamar Machine Limited. Linamar's first major contract was to manufacture automotive oil pumps for Ford. Linamar now operates 22 plants in Guelph.

== Communities ==
Prior to European settlement, this area was occupied by the Attawandaron, also known as the Neutrals in the 1600s. They were an Iroquoian-speaking people. The territory was later held by the Mississaugas of the Credit River; they sold a large tract of land to the government in 1818 and it was first surveyed that year. The name Eramosa was applied to the large parcel of land.

Rockwood is the main community in the township. Today Highway 7 gives access to Rockwood, located between Acton and the city of Guelph. The Eramosa River runs through the centre of the village. Anglo-Europeans settled here because of the river; it provided power for mills, some of the first businesses established. They were integral to industry and became the economic engine of the settlement.

In addition, limestone was extracted for industrial use in those years. The former quarry and mining areas are now protected as the nearby Rockwood Conservation Area. The conservation area is used for such recreation as swimming, hiking, canoeing, picnicking and camping from the last Friday in April to the Sunday following Thanksgiving. It attracts more than 65,000 visitors annually. The conservation area features a small reservoir on the Eramosa River, karst formations, and caves.

The township also includes the smaller communities of Ariss, Brucedale, Centre Inn, Eden Mills, Eramosa, Everton, and Marden. Several former place names connected to 19th-century mills and post offices, such as Armstrong Mills, Birge Mills, Mosborough, and Rockcut, continue to appear on some maps of the area.

Settler Adam Argo named a small area as Eden Mills in 1846 after building a mill there. Over the years, the hamlet had a grist mill, an oatmeal mill, and several saw mills, all powered by the Eramosa River. Other businesses also thrived.

In the 20th century, it had a stop for the Toronto Suburban railway (the station area was later developed as the Edgewood Camp), which ran from Toronto to Guelph. As recently as 1950, two churches and a school (SS#11) operated in the hamlet. The population of the hamlet in early 2019 was 350.

James J. Hill, founder of the Great Northern Railway, was born in Rockwood in 1838.

== Geography ==
In the township there is Guelph Lake and Rockwood which flow into the Speed and Eramosa rivers respectively which all flow into the Grand River

== Demographics ==
Guelph/Eramosa Historical populations
Year	Pop.	±%
1996	10,176	—
2001	11,174	+9.8%
2006	12,066	+8.0%
2011	12,380	+2.6%
2016	12,854	+3.8%

In the 2021 Census of Population conducted by Statistics Canada, Guelph/Eramosa had a population of 13,904 living in 4,838 of its 4,993 total private dwellings, a change of 8.2% from its 2016 population of 12,854. With a land area of 292.84 km^{2} (113.07 sq mi), it had a population density of 47.5/km^{2} (123.0/sq mi) in 2021.

Canada census – Guelph/Eramosa community profile

	2021	2016	2011
Population	13,904 (+8.2% from 2016)	12,854 (+3.8% from 2011)	12,380 (+2.6% from 2006)
Land area	292.84 km^{2} (113.07 sq mi)	291.67 km^{2} (112.61 sq mi)	291.71 km^{2} (112.63 sq mi)
Population density	47.5/km^{2} (123/sq mi)	44.1/km^{2} (114/sq mi)	42.4/km^{2} (110/sq mi)
Median age	45.2 (M: 45.2, F: 45.2)	45.3 (M: 45.0, F: 45.6)
Private dwellings	4,993 (total) 4,838 (occupied)	4,604 (total)	4,334 (total)
Median household income	$129,000	$110,165

References: 2021 2016 2011

== Government ==
Guelph/Eramosa is governed by a mayor and four councillors, with one councillor representing each of the four municipal wards. The Mayor of Guelph/Eramosa represents the town on the Wellington County Council. As of the 2022 election, the elected council members are:

Mayor: Chris White

Councillors:

- Ward 1: Bruce Dickieson
- Ward 2: Corey Woods
- Ward 3: Steven Liebig
- Ward 4: Mark Bouwmeester

== Transportation ==
Highway 6 and Highway 7 pass through the township, with Highway 7 passing through Rockwood. The nearest 400-series highway is Highway 401, which is to the south and southeast.

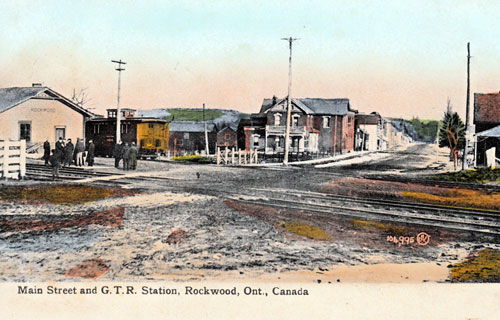
Rockwood railway station and main street c. 1911.

The Metrolinx Guelph Subdivision railway line runs through the southern part of the township. It is used for both passengers and freight (the latter operated by the Canadian National Railway). Despite the line hosting both GO Transit's Kitchener line and Via Rail's Toronto-Sarnia train, no passenger rail service is available in the township; the nearest passenger rail stations are Guelph Central and Acton. Rockwood formerly had a railway station, which was relocated south to the Halton County Radial Railway Museum (technically in the neighbouring town of Milton) for preservation after the end of service.

== Education ==
Guelph/Eramosa township contains three public elementary schools administered by the Upper Grand District School Board. These are:

- Eramosa Public School
- Rockwood Centennial Public School
- Harris Mill Public School (French Immersion)

The Wellington Catholic District School Board opened its first school in the Township in September 2016:

- Sacred Heart Catholic School

There is also one private school located in Guelph/Eramosa:

- Elora Road Christian School

== Media ==
Guelph/Eramosa is covered by local newspapers and television through the following services:

- The Wellington Advertiser
- TVCogeco
- The Acton New Tanner

== Notable people ==
=== Artists ===
- Paul Morin (1959 – ), two-time winner of the Amelia Frances Howard-Gibbon Illustrator's Award with The Orphan Boy in 1991 and The Dragon's Pearl in 1993
- Shawn Van Daele (???? – ), founder of the Drawing Hope Project

=== Athletes ===
- Michael Faulds (1983 – ), Canadian football player who is the head coach of the Wilfrid Laurier Golden Hawks since 2013

=== Doctors ===
- William Julius Mickle (1845 – 1917), known for his 1880 book General Paralysis of the Insane
- John Wishart (1850 – 1926), performed an appendectomy in 1886, becoming an early practitioner of the surgery

=== Evangelists ===
- Lydia Elizabeth Hall (1864 – 1916), Methodist evangelist who was in more than 50 reports in The Christian Guardian

=== Musicians ===
- Peter Appleyard (1928 – 2013), jazz vibraphonist, percussionist and composer who was made an Officer of the Order of Canada in 1992
- Nick Johnston (1987 – ), guitarist, songwriter, composer who was released six solo albums
- Glen Soderholm (1959 – ), singer-songwriter most known for the songs "The Peace Of Christ" (2004), "This Christmas" (2007), and "Mercy Seat" (2008)
- Dave Somerville (1933 – 2015), original lead singer of The Diamonds and inducted into the Canadian Music Hall of Fame in 1984

=== Politicians ===
- Adam Beck (1857 – 1925), member of the Legislative Assembly of Ontario from 1923 – 1925 and founder of the Hydro-Electric Power Commission of Ontario in 1906
- Isaac Erb Bowman (1832 – 1897), member of the House of Commons of Canada from 1867 – 1878 and 1887 – 1896
- Henry Corby Jr. (1851 – 1917), member of the House of Commons of Canada from 1888 – 1901 and served in the Senate of Canada from 1912 – 1917
- Arthur Sturgis Hardy (1837 – 1901), 4th Premier of Ontario from 1896 – 1899
- Henry Alfred Hosking (1908 – 1957), member of the House of Commons of Canada from 1948 – 1957
- James Harold King (1871 – 1949), member of the House of Commons of Canada from 1934 – 1943
- Arthur Maloney (1919 – 1984), member of the House of Commons of Canada from 1957 – 1962 and was the first Ontario Ombudsman from 1975 – 1979
- John Mutrie (1846 – 1928), member of the Legislative Assembly of Ontario from 1894 – 1902
- Thomas Sutherland Parker (1829 – 1868), member of the House of Commons of Canada from 1867 – 1868
- Peter Talbot (1854 – 1919), served in the Senate of Canada from 1906 – 1919
- Edwin Tolton (1856 – 1917), member of the House of Commons of Canada from 1900 – 1904

=== Scientists ===
- Frank N. Freeman (1880 – 1961), psychologist who taught at the University of Chicago from 1909 – 1939 and served as Dean of the University of California, Berkeley from 1939 – 1948
- J. Dewey Soper (1893 – 1982), ornithologist, explorer, zoologist and prolific author who is best known for the successful search of the blue goose nesting grounds near Bowman Bay on Baffin Island in 1929

=== Writers ===
- Kathy Stinson (1952 – ), children's writer known for her book Red is Best, published in 1982
- Ethelwyn Wetherald (1857 – 1940), poet and journalist who is best known for her publication of The House of the Trees and Other Poems in 1885

== See also ==
- List of townships in Ontario
