= Guelph Rowing Club =

Canadian rowing club

Guelph Rowing Club (GRC) is a community rowing club located on Guelph Lake, a dammed reservoir on the Speed River, just north of the Guelph, Ontario, Canada. Rowing has been practised on Guelph Lake since the reservoir's construction in the mid 1970s. The current club was established in 1998 in coordination with the staging of rowing events for that year's Ontario Summer Games.

Notable members of the Guelph rowing community over the years include World Champion and Olympic rower Mel LaForme, Tim Briton-Foster as well as other Canadian National Team athletes including Adam Rabalski and Mark Henry.

Senior programmes including the University of Guelph Gryphons are currently headed up by Dr. David Leger, himself a graduate of Guelph University, who raced for Guelph in the first few years of rowing on the lake in the late 1970s.

== Affiliate programmes ==
A number of local high schools as well as the University of Guelph run rowing programmes as part of the Guelph Rowing Club. Many of the participants of these rowing teams train and race for Guelph outside of their school seasons.

University Programmes:

- University of Guelph Gryphons Rowing

Secondary School (high school) Programmes:

== Competitions ==
Guelph Rowing Club members take part in a number of competitions annually in the region and across Canada (including some US regattas) as well as hosting some of their own events. Notable events include:

- Guelph-McMaster Challenge - annual dual race between the University of Guelph and McMaster University that takes place in mid to late September. Events include Varsity 8+ (1 each for men and women), Junior Varsity 8+ (multiple boats of each gender allowed) and Novice 8+ (multiple boats of each gender allowed). Men's and Women's trophies are awarded to the team whose first crews place highest overall in all three events.
