= Eramosa River =

Coordinates: 43°32′25″N 80°14′23″W

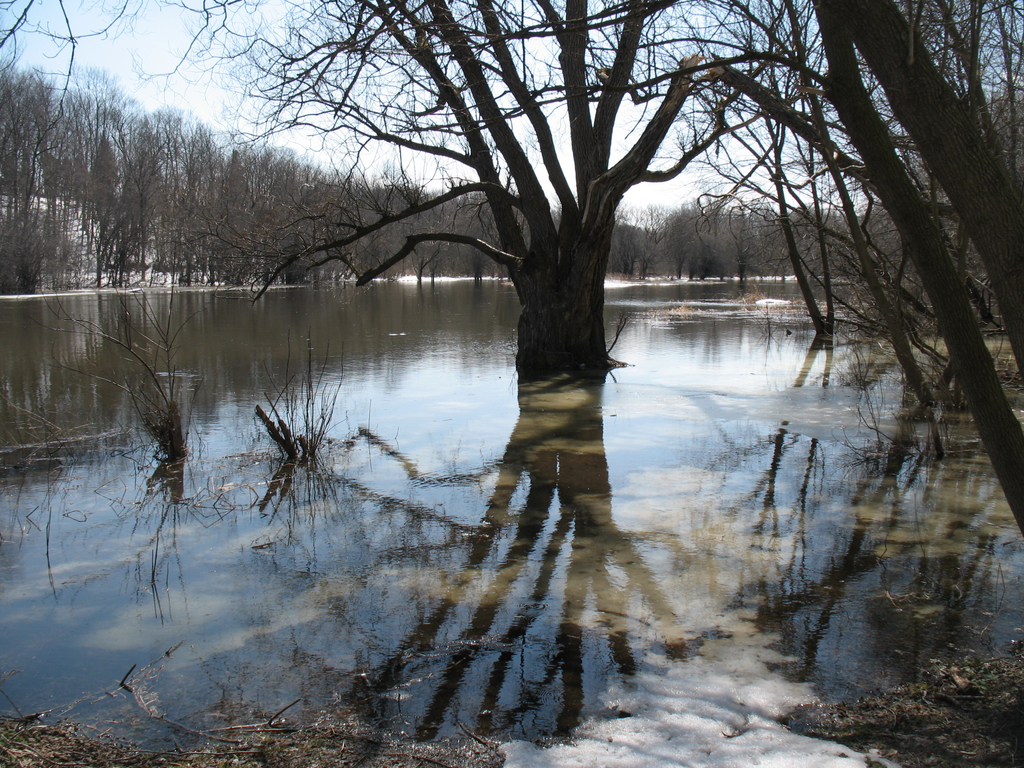
- Flooded Eramosa River in Guelph in early spring

Location
- Country: Canada
- Province: Ontario

Physical characteristics
- Source
  - location: near Erin, Ontario
- Mouth
  - location: Speed River at Guelph, Ontario

The Eramosa River is a river in Wellington County in southwestern Ontario which rises near Erin, Ontario, and flows southwest through the city of Guelph, where it joins the Speed River, which then enters the Grand River in Cambridge. The river is believed to derive its name from the Mississauga word um-ne-mo-sah, meaning "black dog" or "dead dog".

== History ==
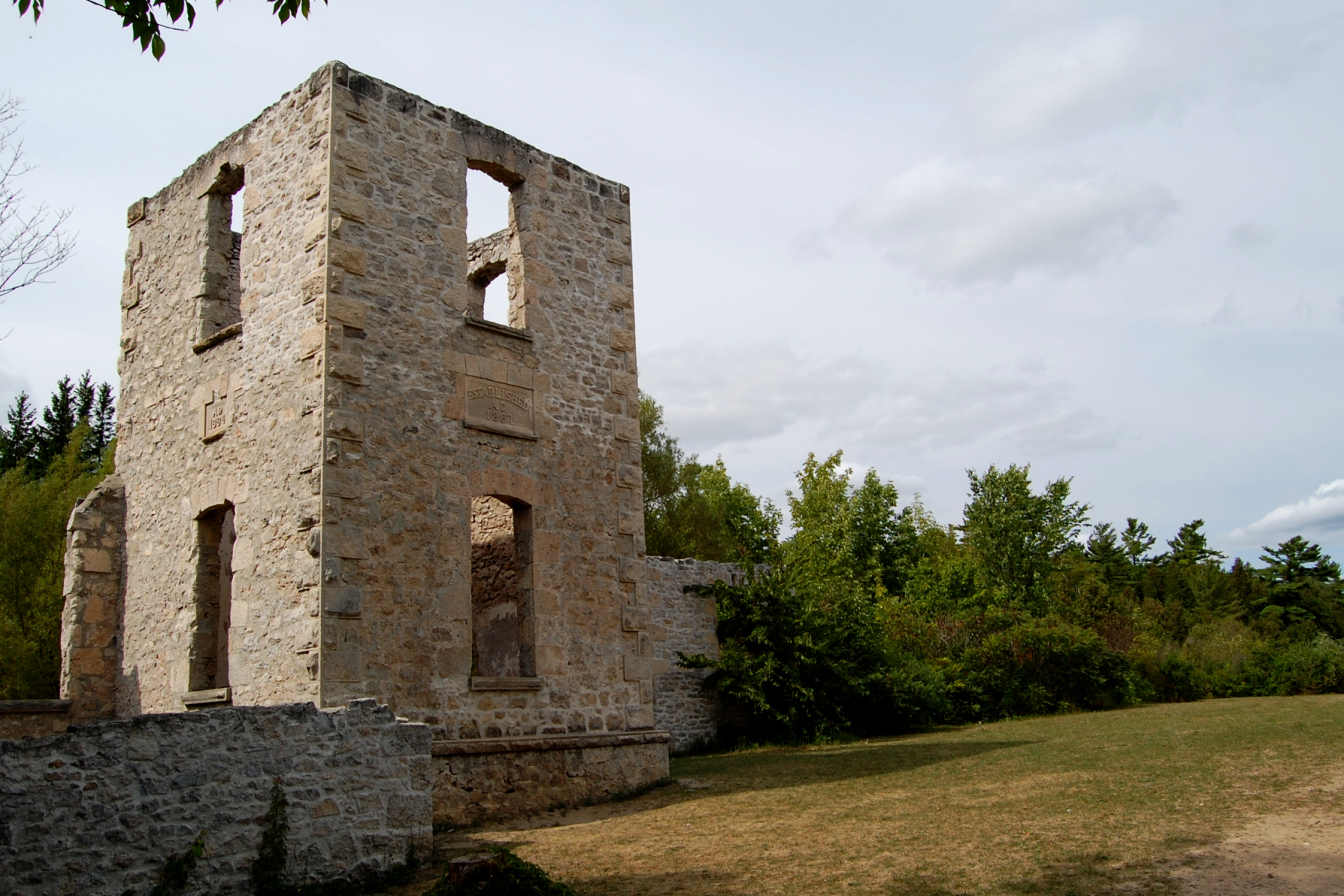
Ruins of the Rockwood Harris Woolen Mills

John Harris settled in the Rockwood area in 1821 and constructed the first mill on the Eramosa River. Harris and other settlers made use of stone quarried from the banks of the river to build dozens of mills, including the Rockwood Woolen Mills in 1867. Built from wood, the first woolen mill was destroyed in 1880 and rebuilt as a stone building in 1884. The mill eventually transitioned to steam power and then electricity before it closed in 1925. As early as the 19th century the Eramosa River was used as a garbage disposal site. A landfill on Guelph's York Road was operated on the banks of the Eramosa until it was closed in the early 1960s, when it was covered with soil and transformed into an urban park.

The Guelph Boating Club was founded in 1870 when the success of Saint John's Paris Crew made rowing a popular activity throughout Canada. By 1873 the river was a hotbed of local activity, with one site known as "Paradise" hosting facilities such as swings, picnic areas, and a shooting range. At another location known as "the Rocks", boaters would row out to search for fossils, pick berries, and hunt ducks. An offshoot of the Guelph Boating Club opened Victoria Park on the banks of the Eramosa River in 1886, and the site soon became a popular summer getaway for boaters and campers. The Boathouse, a local landmark, was erected on the banks of the Eramosa River at this time and gave locals a chance to rent boats for taking out onto the river. The Eramosa River was featured on postcards printed by the International Stationery Company and other Ontario-based printing houses in the 1910s.

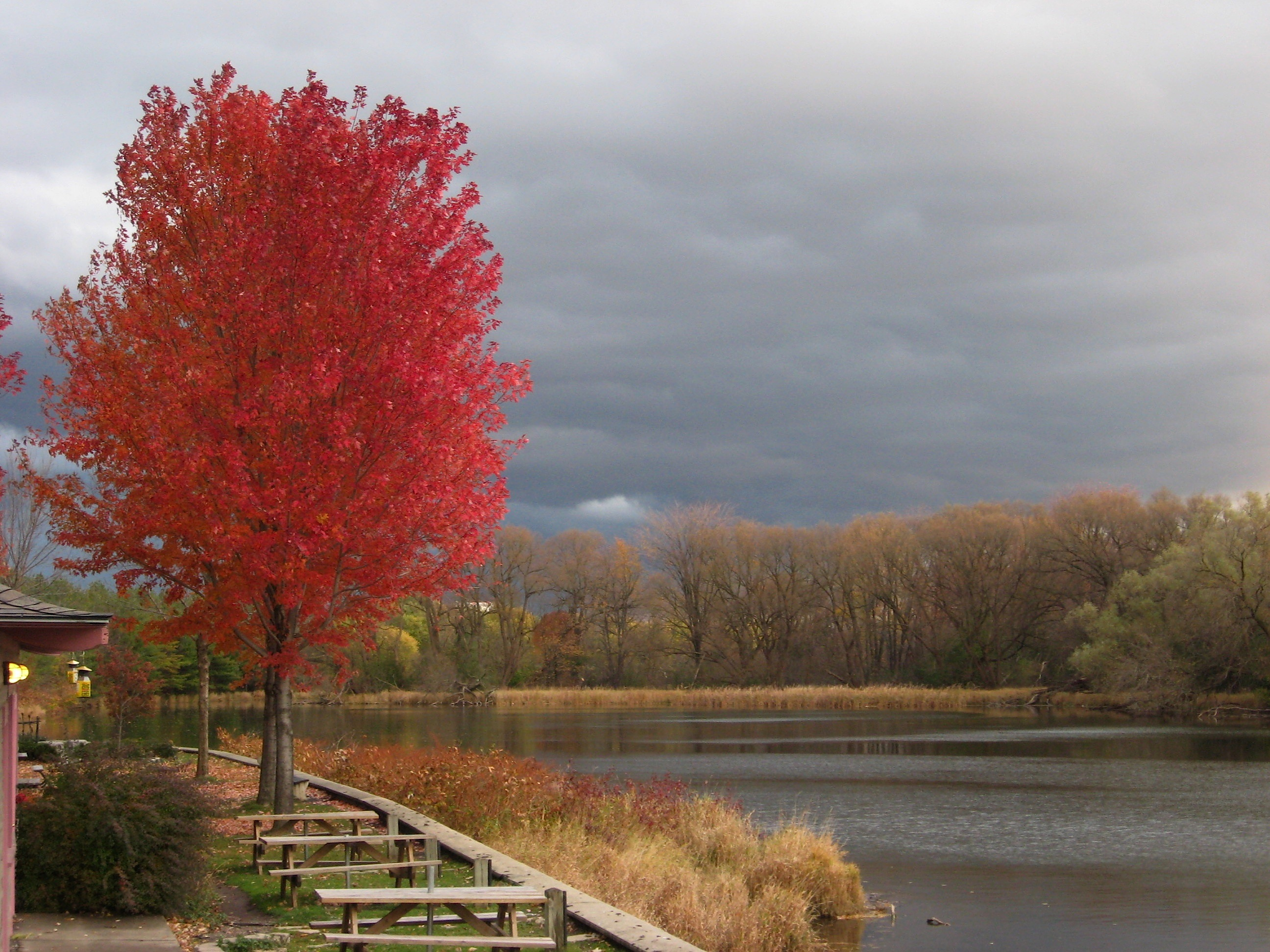
Eramosa River at its confluence with the Speed River

Charles Ambrose Zavitz, a professor at the Ontario Agricultural College, identified the Paradise area as being ideal for small-scale farming, as it was located on a floodplain too marshy for any agriculture which required wagons or other machinery, and suggested it as a place model prisoners could engage in penal labour and develop a prison farm. The first structures at the Ontario Reformatory were built on the banks of the Eramosa River in 1909, and the facility received its first fourteen prisoners (called "trusties", as they were trusted to work without armed guards or shackles) in April 1910. Another popular site, the Rocks, was made into a quarry where materials such as lime and crushed rock could be mined and used for construction at the Reformatory. The prison and the Rocks were connected by a small railway that traversed the Eramosa River by way of a bridge that was also built by the trusties. The cornerstone of the Ontario Reformatory was laid down by Premier James Whitney on 25 September 1911, who ceremoniously crossed a concrete bridge built by the inmates just a year earlier before arriving at the prison. Inmates at the Ontario Reformatory were also responsible for landscaping and creating ponds along the banks of the Eramosa. Twice in the prison's history prisoners escaped the Ontario Reformatory by boat and rowed down the Eramosa River to Guelph before disappearing, leaving the boat behind. The Ontario Reformatory shut down in 2001, but the land remained property of the government of Ontario until 2019.

The Rookwood Harris Woolen Mill, which was constructed on the banks of the Eramosa River in 1867, was abandoned in 1925. The first textile mill in the region, the machinery inside was powered by the flowing waters of the Eramosa while it was operational. A. J. Casson, a member of the famed Group of Seven painters, visited the site at one point to paint the mill and the Eramosa River. The building became a local landmark until it was closed to the public in 2007 when the structure (which had been gutted in a 1967 fire) was deemed unsafe. Restoration was undertaken on the structure (costing $850,000) by the Rockwood Conservation Area and it was ultimately reopened in August 2011.

24-year-old Guelph resident Cody Thompson disappeared on 1 April 2016 after making a phone call made to his father from the area of the Boathouse and was registered as a missing person on 11 April. A police search of the Eramosa River shortly after turned up a fragment of Thompson's birth certificate. Subsequent searches of the river were made by both police and volunteers, and Thompson's remains were discovered on 21 May. A nine-month police investigation into Thompson's disappearance and tragic death determined that there was no criminal connection to the case.

In 2016, railcars at the Elizabeth Street Facility, a distribution centre owned by trucking company Polymer Distribution Inc. (PDI), spilled thousands of microplastic beads into storm drains, littering the Eramosa River. Local environmentalist Bryan McNeill brought the issue to public attention after recovering thirty-five garbage bags filled with nurdles, causing the Ministry of the Environment, Conservation and Parks (MOE) to launch an investigation in September 2017 and confirm PDI as the source of the beads. In response, PDI consultants surveyed 3.5 kilometres (2.2 mi) of the Eramosa River's northern bank and cleaned up thousands of nurdles. Subsequent inspections of the river's plastic content have found the beads were present in the Eramora as late as summer 2019, though representatives from the MOE have suggested that PDI is still committed to cleaning the river.

Attempts to install a new sewer line by the city of Guelph resulted in an overflow of sewage into the Eramosa River on 17 February 2019, a spill that sent 4.4 million litres of waste into the river over a period of three hours; this was followed by a smaller spill of 25,000 litres three days later. Also in early 2019, the Eramosa River Conservation Corridor was created by the rare Charitable Research Reserve after the organization purchased 87 acres (0.35 km^{2}) of riverfront property in Rockwood.

=== Bridges ===
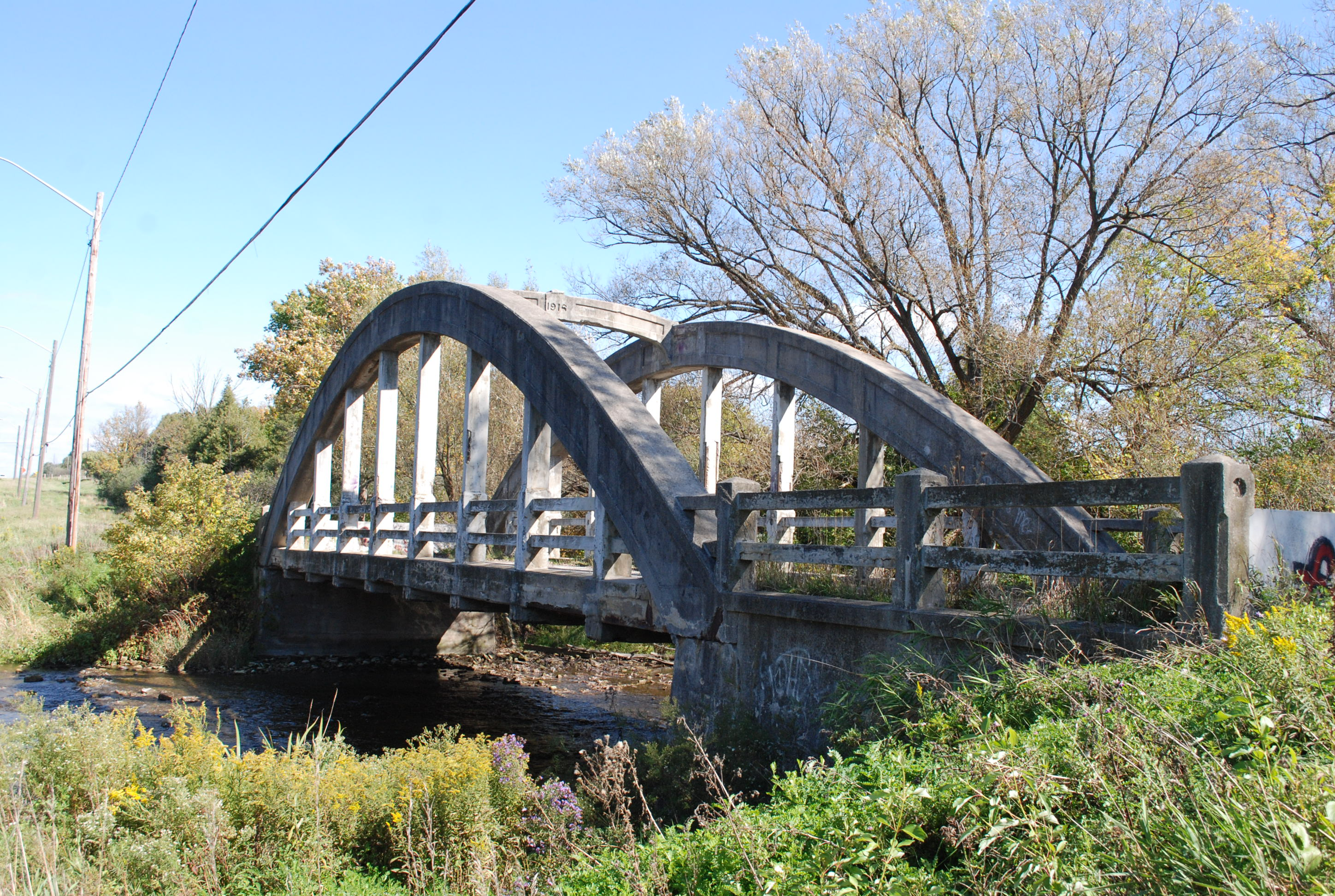
MacQuillan's Bridge

A number of bridges have been built to cross the Eramosa River.

The Guelph Junction Railway constructed a bridge over the river in 1888, at a site between Guelph's Royal City Jaycees Park (then known as "Paradise") and Victoria Park.

A three-arched concrete bridge was constructed over the river in 1910 using penal labour from the Ontario Reformatory. A wooden trestle bridge was soon constructed to connect the small railway at the Rocks to the Ontario Reformatory by way of a branch line. The 12.2 metres (40 ft) Benham Bridge was also constructed in 1910 to bridge the Eramosa on Eramosa-Erin Townline Road.

MacQuillan's Bridge, a 21.3 metres (70 ft) concrete arched truss bridge (also known as a "bowstring bridge"), was constructed in 1916 to replace an earlier wooden bridge. As little boat traffic passed along this point of the Eramosa River, Wellington County engineer A. W. Connor and Italian-Canadian mason Charles Mattaini built the bridge low over the water. The bridge is named for the McQuillan family, which settled in Guelph in 1827, and is today also known as the Stone Road Bridge. It was named an Ontario Heritage Bridge in 2004. It is located along the township boundary between Guelph and Puslinch. The bridge is closed to public access in January 2025, after what cycling, heritage, and other groups suggest was 25 years of neglect.

The Eramosa River Bridge is a 15.24 metres (50.0 ft) reinforced concrete ridge frame bridge and was constructed in 1953 (as the Ospringe Bridge) to facilitate travel along Wellington Road 124 in Erin, Ontario, near the springs that feed the river. At the time of construction, the Ospringe Bridge was the fourth concrete ridge frame bridge built in Wellington County. It has since been renamed to, and is now the Eramosa River Bridge. A 2018 survey found the bridge to be in a state of advanced deterioration.

The Lattice Covered Bridge was erected on 1 June 1992 by 400 members of the Timber Framers Guild. It is one of only two lattice bridges in Ontario, and was built based on a design originally drawn up in the 19th century. The bridge is 44 metres (144 ft) long.

== Hydrology ==
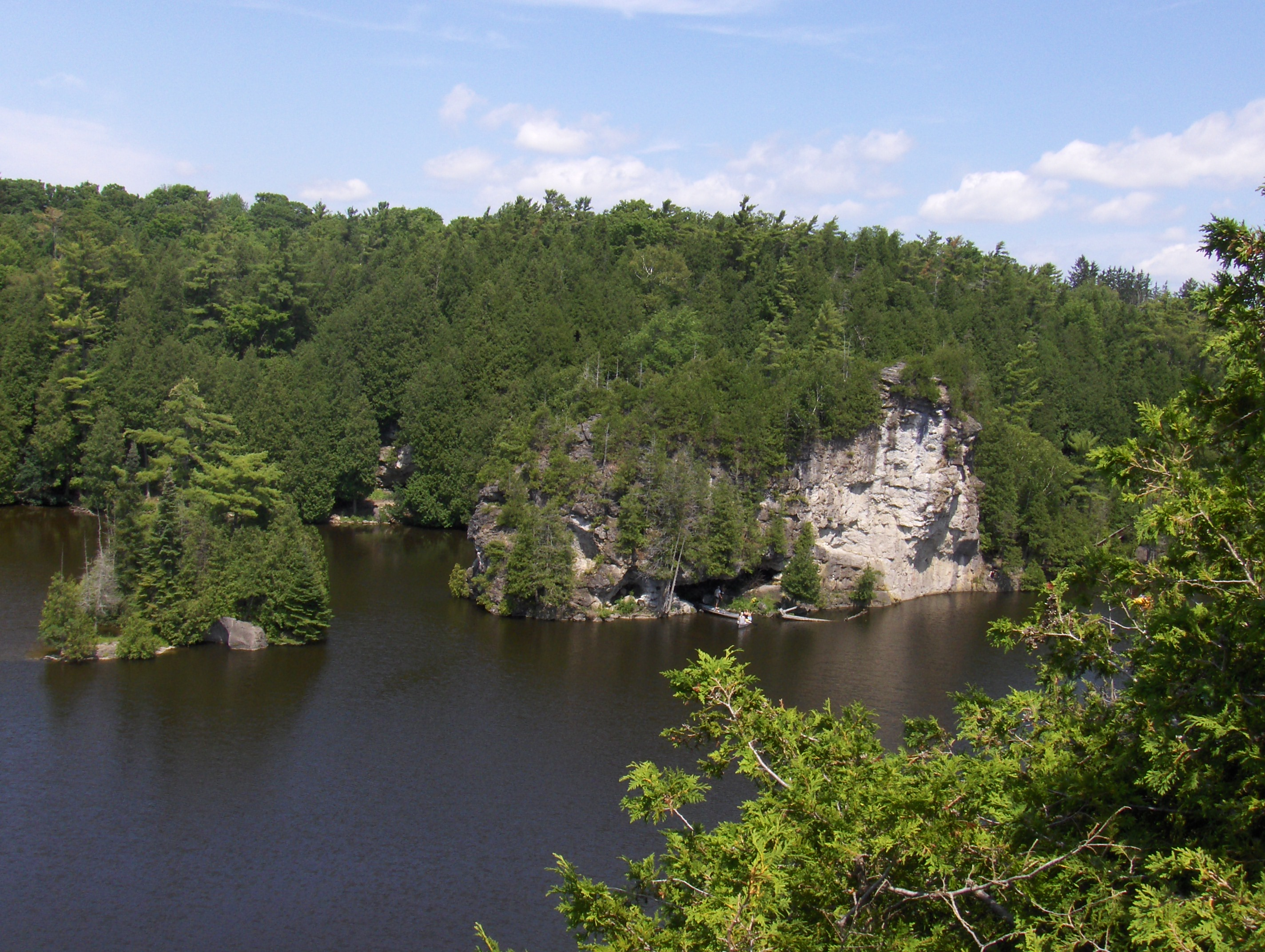
Glacial bluffs at the Rockwood Conservation Area

The Eramosa River is fed by groundwater springs, and travels along the course of a bedrock moraine carved by glacial activity. The banks of the river are marshy and untenable for agriculture. Artificial measures including levees and ponds are used to reduce the Eramosa's floodplain. The Guelph Dam, located at the mouth of the Eramosa, also regulates the flow and depth of the river; when open, the water level can drop to as little as 6 inches (15 cm).

The Eramosa flows through an area covered with over 200 glacial potholes near Rockwood. One of the largest of these is the Devil's Well, which measures 6.4 metres (21 ft) wide at the top and 4.9 metres (16 ft) at its base; and 13.1 metres (43 ft) deep. The glacial landforms are contained within Rockwood Conservation Area, where the bluffs measure 5–30 metres (16–98 ft) deep and 7–200 metres (23–656 ft) wide. All of these landforms were created by the recession of the Laurentide Ice Sheet at the end of the Wisconsin glaciation.

Erosion has also revealed outcroppings of the Eramosa Formation, a Silurian geological formation known to bear fossils.

=== Pollution ===
Relative to other bodies of water in the Grand River watershed, the Eramosa has very low levels of phosphorus, nitrogen, and chloride. The Eramosa's water quality is exceptional nearest to its source but becomes polluted while passing through the city of Guelph, a product of industrial waste, municipal solid waste deposited in landfills on its banks, and untreated stormwater. Erosion regularly exposes long-buried trash on the banks of the river, necessitating annual cleanup efforts. Nonetheless, the Eramosa is clean enough that the city of Guelph draws water from it to be treated and used as drinking water; and a 2019 survey of the Eramosa River Conservation Corridor in Rockwood found that the upriver sections of the Eramosa River have been minimally impacted by invasive plants, the riparian zone has been left untouched by modern development, and even harbour endangered species.

As a result of manufacturing facilities near the river, plastic resin pellet pollution became cause for concern in 2016, when thousands of nurdles were found to be entering the Eramosa River through storm drains. Though microplastics are still being found in the river, the rate at which they are found in the Eramosa has decreased in recent years.

== Ecology ==
The Eramosa River provides hydration to the local ecosystem and is surrounded mostly by the Eastern Great Lakes lowland forest, a temperate broadleaf and mixed forest which covers much of southeastern Ontario. The Eramosa River and its riparian zone are considered "core greenlands" by Wellington County, and are regulated by the Grand River Conservation Authority.

Trees present along the banks of the Eramosa include conifers.

Beavers live and construct dams in the Eramosa River. Hundreds of species of birds are also endemic to the region, with gulls and passerines being the most common types sighted around the Eramorsa-Speed River confluence. Multiple species of duck also call the river home, including ring-necked ducks and mallards; as do Canada geese.

Fishes living in the river include the largemouth bass, smallmouth bass, northern pike, rainbow trout, brook trout, brown trout, brown bullhead, and pumpkinseed.

The largely-undeveloped upriver sections of the Eramosa River serve as a natural refuge for a number of at-risk and endangered species. Bobolinks, golden-winged warblers, eastern wood pewees, and barn swallows roost in the area, but are threatened elsewhere by habitat loss. Rock polypody, maidenhair spleenwort, and goldthread are all rare or at-risk in the region, but are present around the Eramosa River. Blanding's turtles, northern map turtles, eastern ribbonsnakes, little brown bats, and monarch butterflies have also been spotted in the area.

== Recreation ==
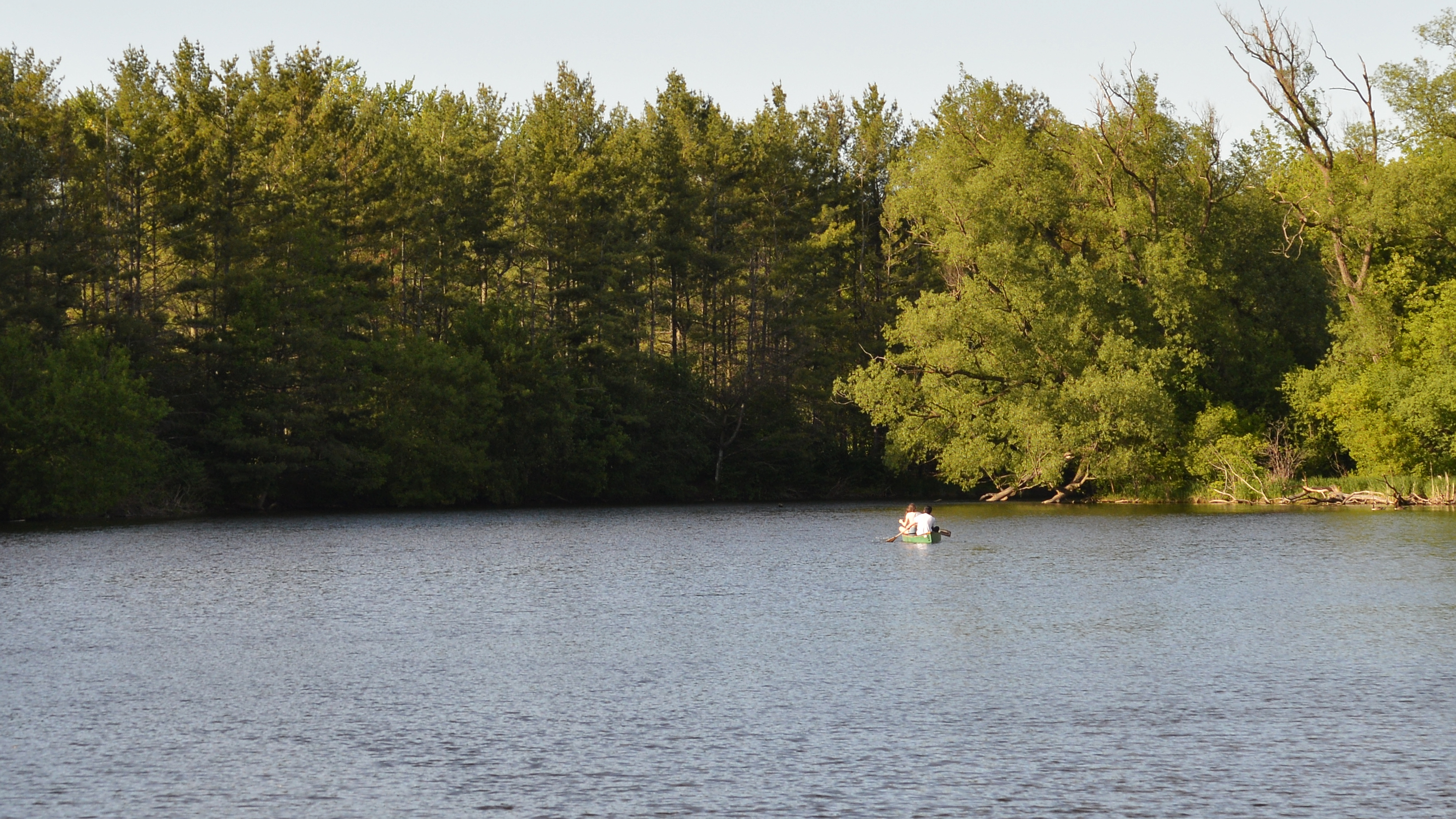
Canoes on the Eramosa River

The Eramosa River Trail in Guelph extends 4.1 kilometres (2.5 mi) from York Road to Stone Road, passing through Eramosa River Park and crossing Victoria Road along the way. It is open year-round, and is amenable to snowshoeing in the winter. A section of the trail between York Road and Lawrence Avenue is wheelchair accessible. It is part of a 20 kilometres (12 mi) network of trails that intersect around the Eramosa River.

Camping and other outdoor activities can be done at Rockwood Conservation Area in Rockwood. An unsupervised beach offers opportunities for swimming. The park represents the greatest concentration of glacial landforms along the Eramosa River, and features opportunities for spelunking in its many limestone caves. The caves are closed to the public from mid-October to the beginning of April to accommodate bat hibernation. The park is open throughout winter (with an exception for the Christmas holiday) but the park offers no specific winter activities besides hiking.

Boating on the Eramosa River has been a popular activity since the 19th century. It is possible to canoe on the Eramosa, though downed trees and exposed rocks serve as obstacles along the course of the river. Canoeing trips can begin near the river's headwaters near Erin or further downstream in Guelph/Eramosa and continue as far as the Guelph Dam, passing waterfront homes and a number of local landmarks (including the Ontario Reformatory prison and Cargill meat packing plant) along the way into and through Guelph. When the Guelph Dam is open, water levels in the river become so low that paddlers are forced to frequently disembark and drag their canoe across its shallowest sections.

Even in the urban stretches of the Eramosa, anglers are able to catch and cook fish from the river.

== See also ==
- List of rivers of Ontario
- Arkell Spring Grounds
