= Rockwood Conservation Area =

Protected area in Ontario, Canada

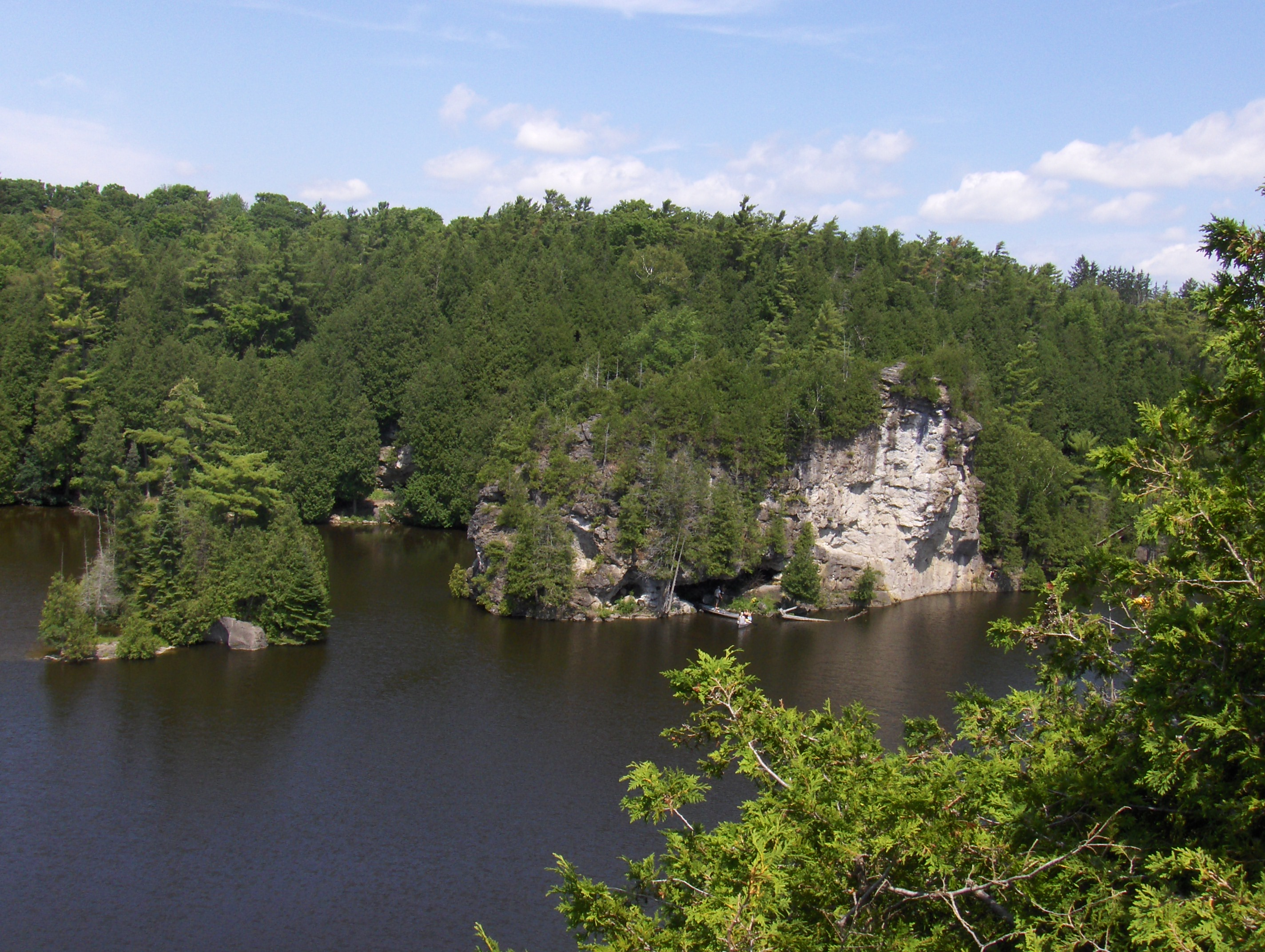
- Rockwood Conservation Area

- Location within Ontario
- Location: Ontario, Canada
- Coordinates: 43.6116°N 80.1456°W
- Established: 1963
- Website: www.grandriver.ca/en/outdoor-recreation/Rockwood.aspx

The Rockwood Conservation Area, is a moderate sized conservation area situated in Rockwood, Ontario, Canada. Public operations run between May 1 and the first Sunday following Thanksgiving. A small admittance fee is required to access the park, but individuals or groups may purchase a membership that allows access to the eleven parks operated by the Grand River Conservation Authority. It is a popular destination for many local residents, with over 65,000 patrons visiting every year to enjoy the geological attractions of the park, as well as the historic ruins of the Rockwood Woolen Mills.

== Location ==
Located in Rockwood, Ontario and situated a short distance from the city of Guelph, this conservation area is on both sides of the Eramosa River and is a central location within Southern Ontario. The nearby Highway 401 and Highway 7 allows this conservation area to be easily accessible from some of Southern Ontario’s major cities, such as Toronto.

== History ==
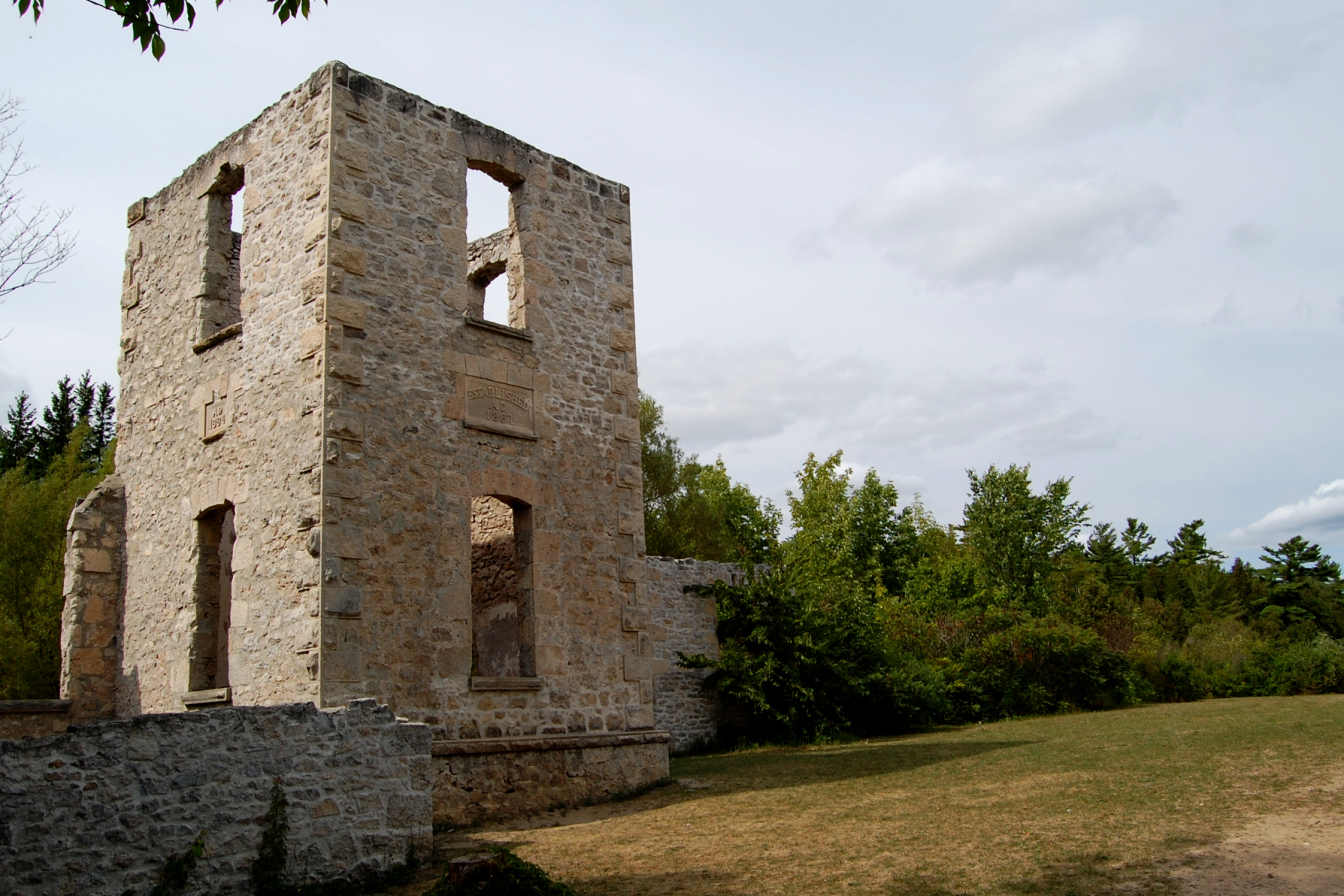
Ruins of the old Mill.

The Rockwood Woolen Mill was established in 1867 by brothers John Richard, Thomas, and Joseph Harris, and their brother-in-law Thomas Wetherald. The firm advertised in publications in nearby cities such as Guelph, Milton, and Georgetown. The business thrived. Over the years, the mill was powered by the water of the Eramosa River, hydro, and steam.

In the 1880s, a fire harshly damaged the mill. It was replaced by a stone structure in 1884. One of the founding brothers, John Richard Harris, died in 1899; as a result, his sons took over the business. During the First World War, the mill would frequently operate 24 hours a day, securing vast orders for Canadian army blankets. The mill closed its doors in 1931, in the midst of the Great Depression.

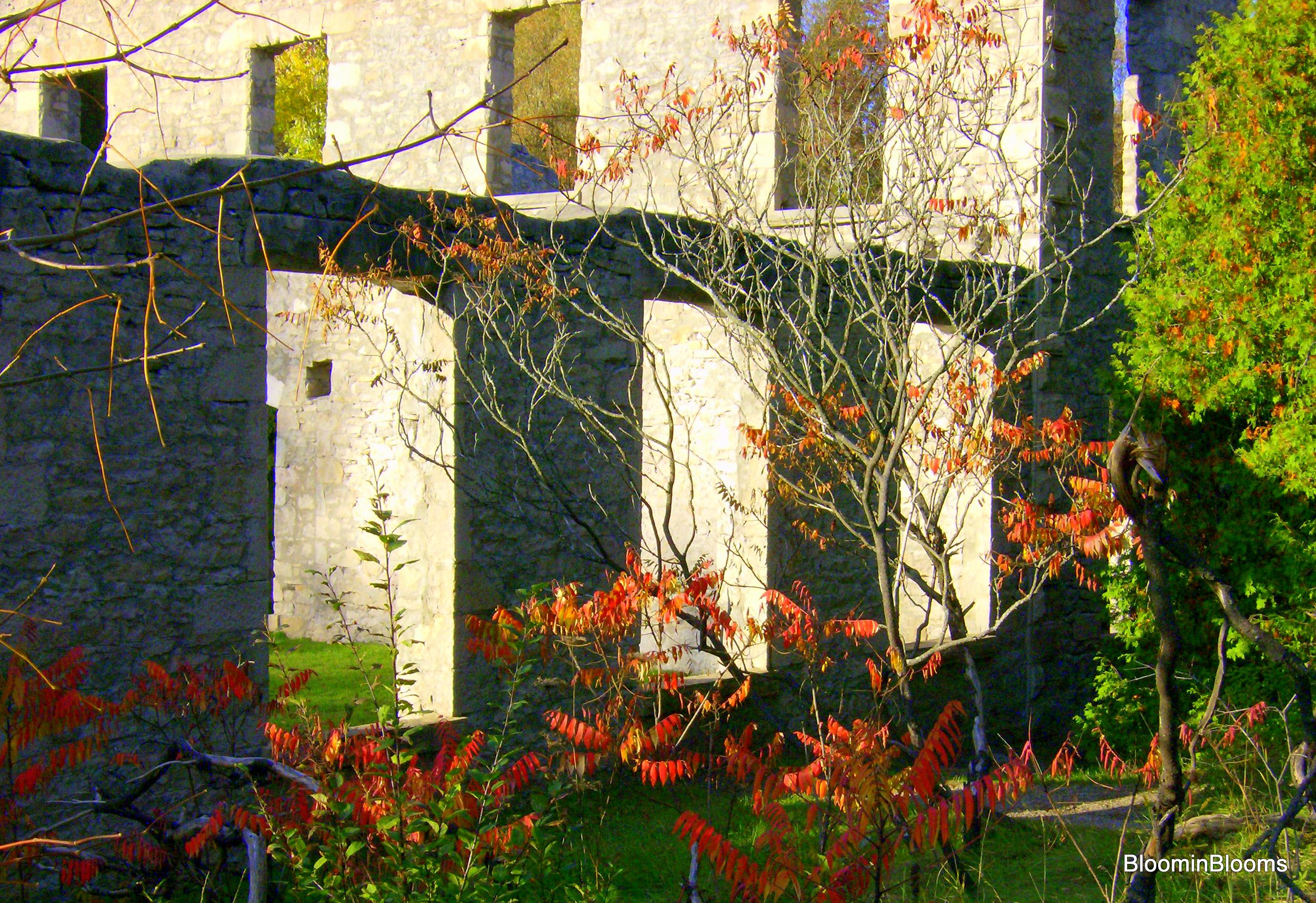
Stone walls of the old woolen mills at Rockwood Conservation Area.

After the closure of the mill, William Harris, son of John Richard, transformed the site into a private park named Hi-Pot-Lo Park. In 1959 the Grand River Conservation Authority obtained the mill and land from Harris, and the official opening of the park took place in 1963.

A large restoration of the mill ruins was completed over the winter of 2010, allowing it to be open to the public for the 2011 season.

== Environmental features ==
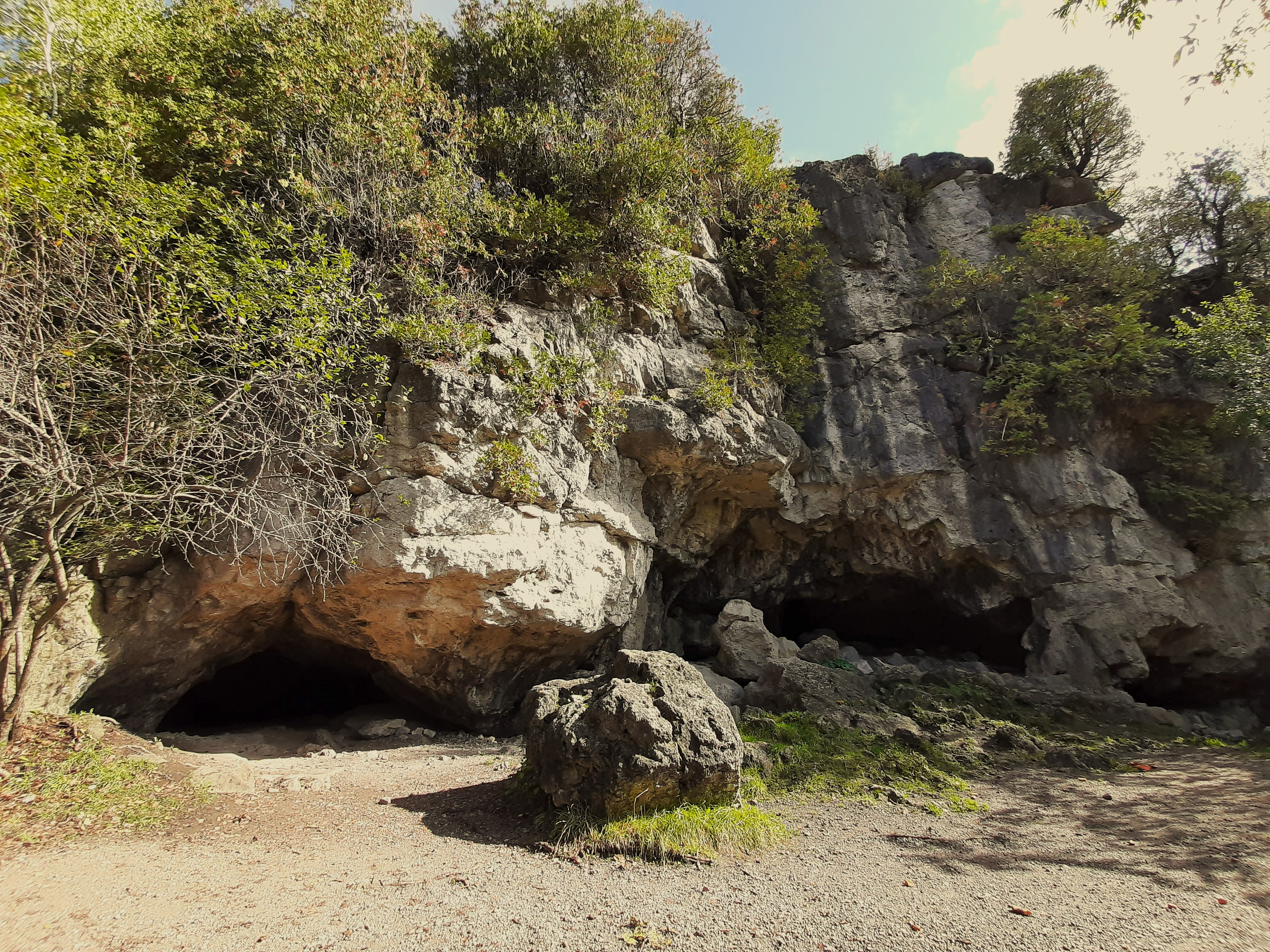
Caves on Cedar Ridge Trail

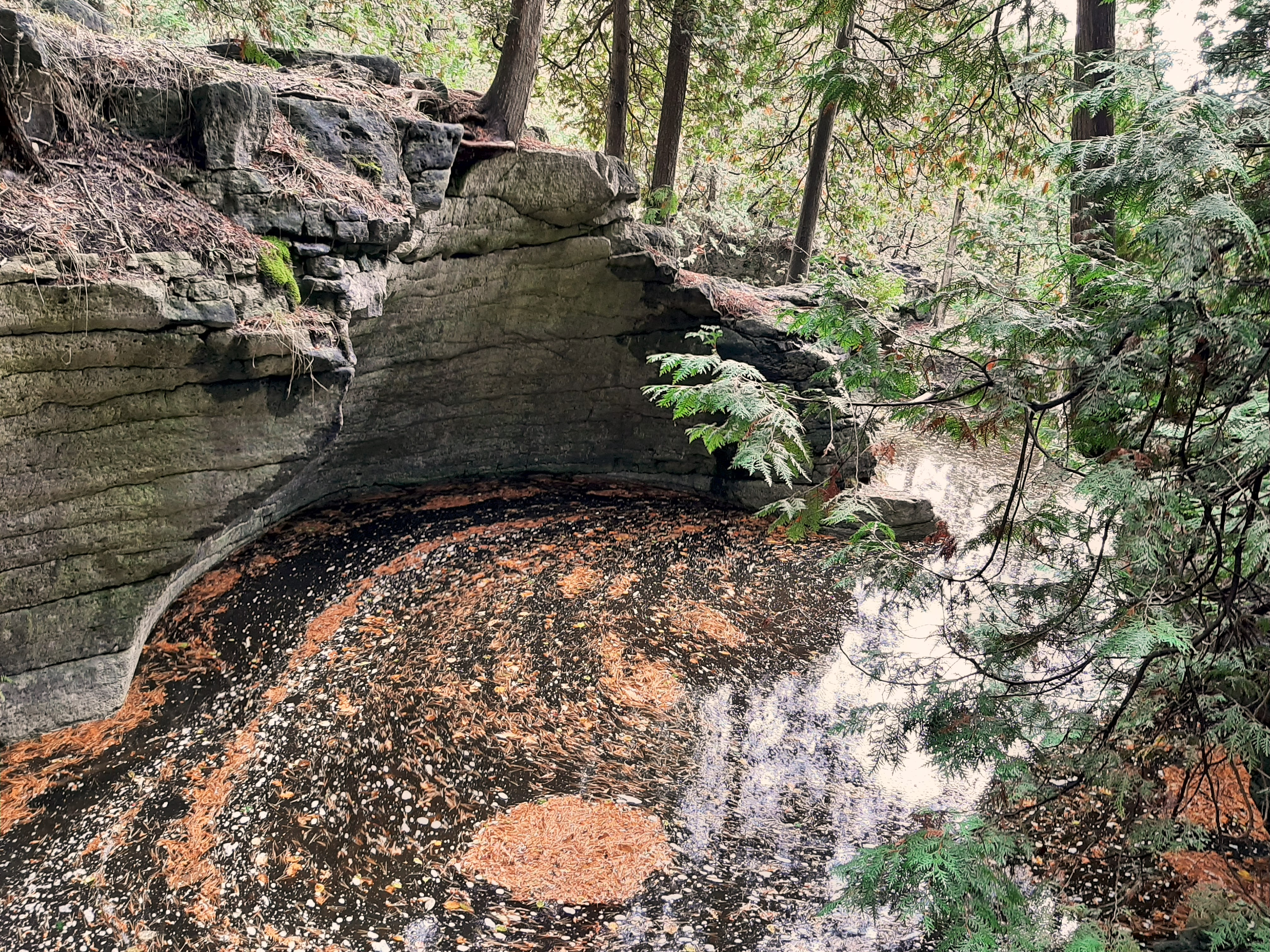
Giant's Kettle on Pothole Trail

The Rockwood Conservation Area has a rich and unique geological aspect. A few specific features that are a part of the environment at the Rockwood conservation area include glacier bluffs, potholes, caves and some of the oldest dated trees in Ontario.

The cave system includes a series of 12 caves, which is one of the most extensive networks in Ontario. Within the caves is a prominent feature called flowstone, which over many years is created by flowing water that deposits a type of calcium carbonate called calcite.

Another feature at Rockwood are the potholes. Within the conservation area, there is over 200 potholes that all vary in measurements. These potholes are also known as giant's kettles, which are large cavities that have been drilled by flowing water carrying stones and gravel.

As well, glacial bluffs are seen at Rockwood. These have been formed over thousands of years after the earth’s most recent ice age ended. They can be relatively small and get as large as 30 meters deep and 200 meters wide.

== Wildlife ==
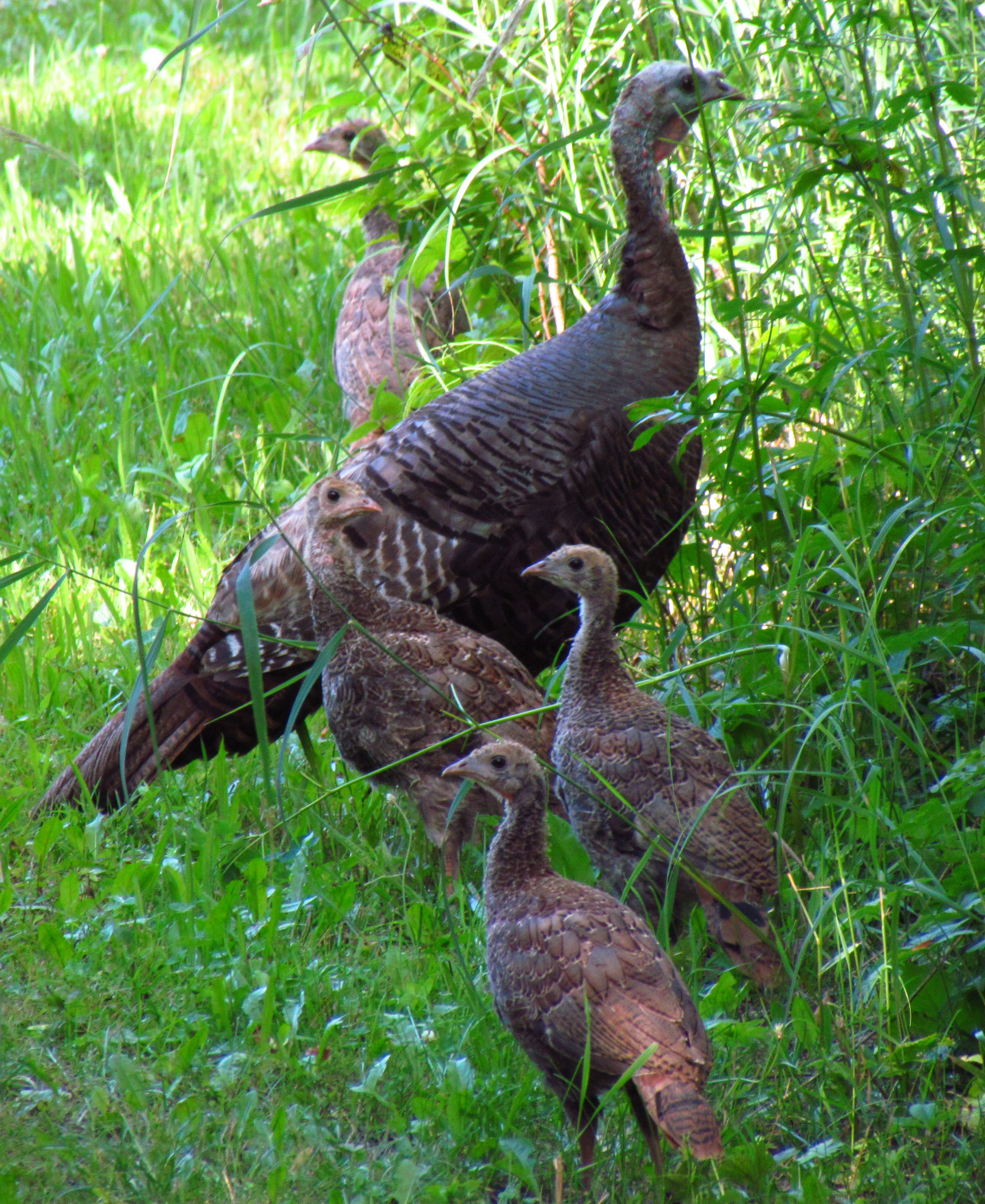
A female wild turkey with juveniles

While the area consists of wildlife typical to most of southern Ontario, such as deer, coyotes, raccoons, opossums, skunks, beavers, ducks and geese. The Rockwood area has a varied supply of fish that includes perch, crappie, rock bass, sunfish and chub.

A more recent addition to the wildlife at Rockwood has been the reintroduction of wild turkeys. Due to unregulated hunting, wild turkeys were at one point completely gone. However, eastern wild turkeys from the southern United States were introduced to this area within the past 20 years and are now permanent residents.

== Activities ==
=== Camping ===
The Rockwood Conservation Area has around 105 campsites in four main campgrounds, serviced and unserviced campsites are available on a daily term. Other facilities include washrooms and a concession.

=== Fishing ===
Fishing is permitted within the Eramosa River. The Grand River Conservation Area and the Ministry of Natural Resources fill the waters once a year with rainbow trout in a goal to promote fishing.

=== Trails ===
With occasionally high cliffs and steep inclines, the two main trails allow hikers to travel beside the river’s edge and within the forest. Accessible by wheelchairs in most areas, these trails can be reached from either the beach or the mill ruins.

=== Swimming ===
There is a large sandy beach in the conservation area which allows visitors to go swimming during the summer. There is no beach patrol in this area, however a life-jacket loaner program is offered.

=== Recreation ===
A mini golf course is located near the front entrance as well as a playground for children. Canoeing is one of the more popular activities at the conservation area. Canoes, kayaks and paddleboards can be rented on weekends during the summer.
