= Idylwild Park =

Park in Cambridge, Canada

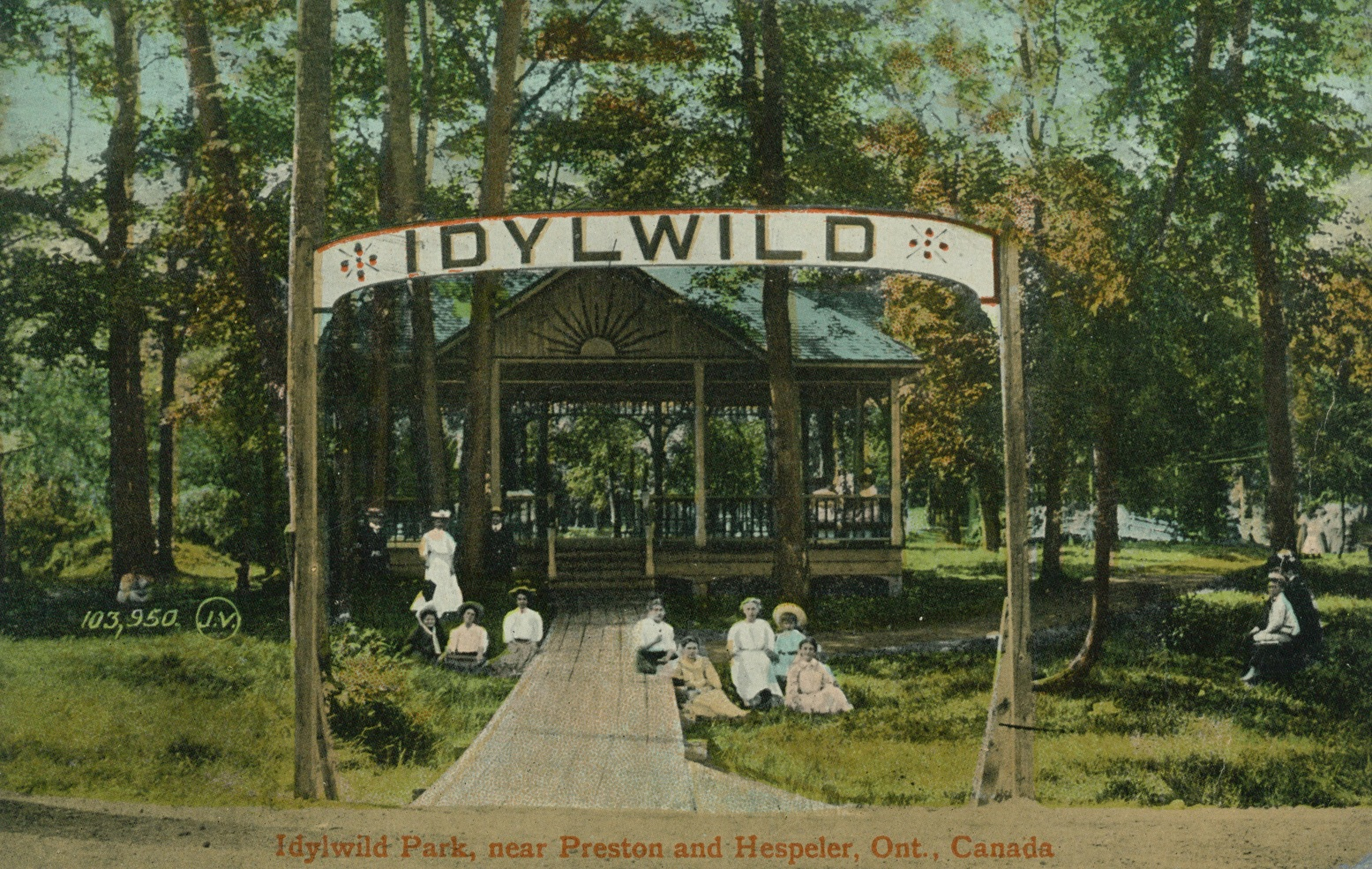
- Entrance gate, Idylwild Park.
- Interactive map of Idylwild Park
- Type: Private park
- Location: Cambridge, Ontario, Canada
- Coordinates: 43.415542°N 80.340091°W
- Created: 1899
- Operator: GP&H Street Railway
- Status: Permanently closed in 1916

Idylwild Park was a park located on the Speed River in what is now Cambridge, Ontario, Canada. It attracted people from across Southwestern Ontario and the Golden Horseshoe, via the Grand Trunk Railway and the Galt, Preston & Hespeler (GP&H) Street Railway.

Idylwild fell between the Town of Preston and the Town of Hespeler, just north of where the MacDonald-Cartier Freeway crosses the river today.

== History ==
Idylwild Park was opened in 1899 by operators of the GP&H Street Railway. Their purpose for establishing it was to stimulate rail travel during the weekends. It was accessed exclusively via the Preston-Hespeler line, which was opened the same year. Park-goers were given ribbons to wear that identified them as patrons of the park and rail-line.

"A wooded area with tall elms, maples and evergreens - a perfect setting for one of, if not the, most popular playground, picnic and recreational centres in the district. Popular dances of the time included quadrilles, waltzes, two-steps and the cake walk. It was not at all uncommon for the railway to shunt in from Preston Junction a train load of picnickers from as far away as Hamilton, bringing hundreds to enjoy the great out-of-doors in the wilds of Idylwild." - O.A. Kummer

Man piloting a johnboat on the Speed River, Idylwild Park. A footbridge spanning the river is in the background.

Straddling the Speed River within Hunt Club Valley, the park encompassed lands on both banks, as well as an islet between them. Wooden footbridges were erected to facilitate travel across the river and to the islet. The bridges were disassembled in the autumn, to accommodate for ice and floods, and then reassembled in the spring.

Additionally, the park featured a refreshment booth, a baseball diamond and a spring, as well as two pavilions, swings, boardwalks and docks.

The nickname "Mosquito Park" came to be assumed for the park, as mosquitos thrived in the area due to the surrounding wetlands.

In 1916, Idylwild Park was closed permanently. It has been suggested that the growing usage of the automobile, the First World War and the establishment of Riverside Park in the nearby Town of Preston contributed to the closure of the park.

== Present day ==
The landscape of the site has since either grown over, eroded or been developed. The gates, pavilions, bridges and other structures are no longer present. The mosquitos, however, remain.

A portion of the former site, along the northern bank of the Speed River, is now part of Chilligo Conservation Area that is owned and managed by the Grand River Conservation Authority. The City of Cambridge's Mill Run Trail passes through, making use of the dismantled rail-bed.

The islet and most of the northern bank are private property.

A nearby subdivision, Idylwild Estates, is named after the park.

== See also ==
- Grand River Railway
- Grand Trunk Railway
- Hespeler, Ontario
- Interurban
- Preston Car Company
- Preston, Ontario
- Speed River
