= Hillside Festival =

Annual summer festival in Ontario, Canada

Coordinates: 43.597°N 80.243°W

- Frequency: Annually
- Location: Guelph Lake Conservation Area
- Inaugurated: 1984
- Most recent: 2025
- Next event: 2026
- Website: hillsidefestival.ca

The Hillside Festival is an annual three-day, five-stage (including one kids' stage) summer festival occurring in Guelph, Ontario, Canada, hosting musicians, spoken word artists, workshops and more. The Hillside Festival occurs in late July on Guelph Lake Island.

== List of past performers ==
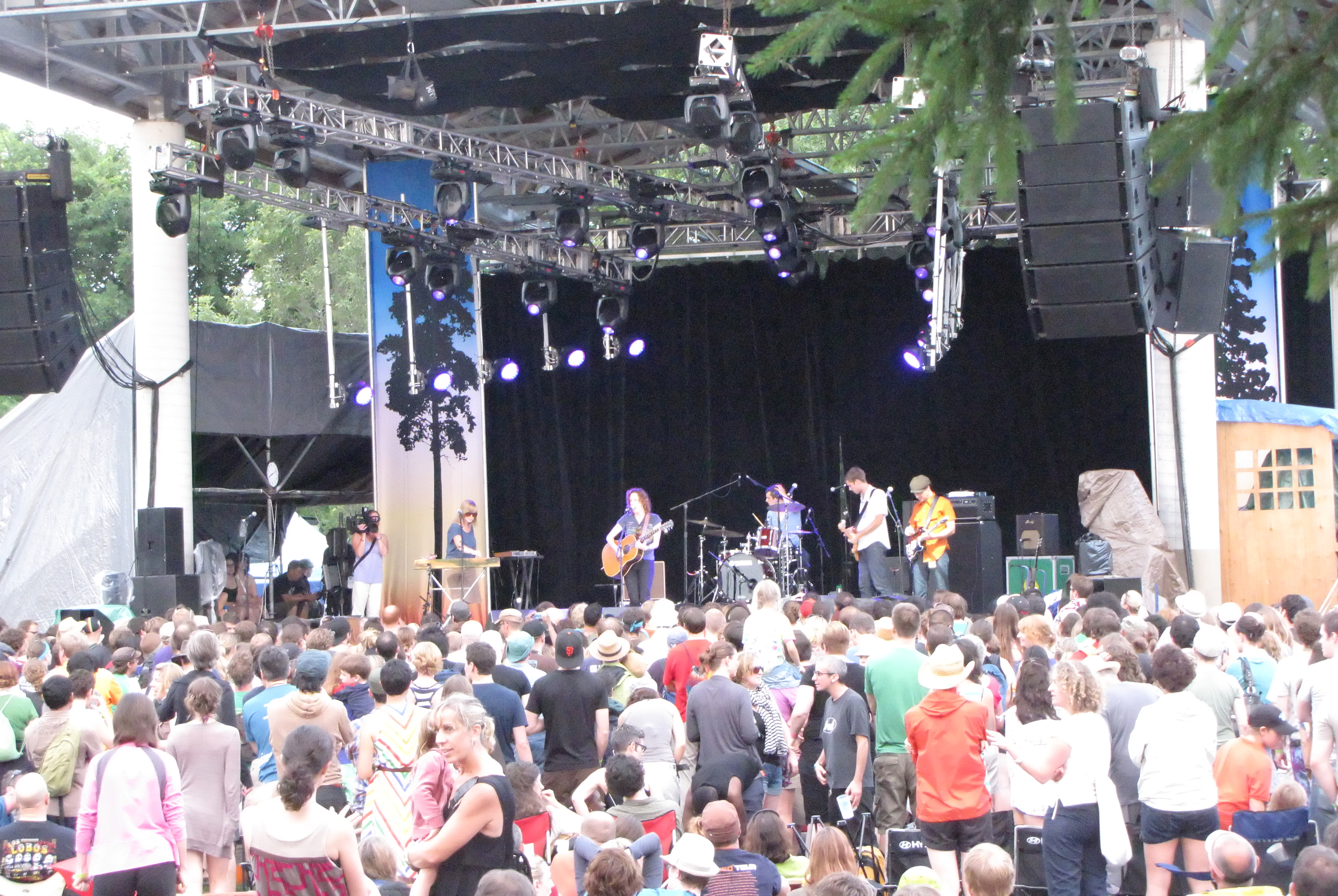
Sarah Harmer performing at the Hillside Festival mainstage in 2010

Notable performers who have played at Hillside include:

- Acorn, The (2008, 2010)
- ALX (2012)
- Arkells (2009, 2012, Inside 2011)
- Akron/Family (2008, 2013)
- Arcade Fire (2004, 2005)
- Joseph Arthur (2008)
- BADBADNOTGOOD (2012)
- Barenaked Ladies (1989, 1991)
- Basia Bulat (2007, 2010, 2014)
- Beardyman (2010)
- Be Good Tanyas (2005, 2011)
- Bedouin Soundclash (inside 2009, 2023)
- Bombay Bicycle Club (2012)
- Bourbon Tabernacle Choir (2008)
- Broken Social Scene (2003, 2005, 2008)
- Emerald City, The (2010)
- Buck 65 (2003, 2005)
- Burning Spear (2000)
- By Divine Right (1999, 2002)
- Cadence Weapon
- Neko Case (2002)
- City and Colour (Dallas Green) (Inside 2007)
- Bruce Cockburn (1998, 2019)
- Jason Collett (2008, 2010)
- Constantines (2001, 2002, 2006, 2015)
- Cowboy Junkies (2008, 2026)
- Cuff the Duke (2003, 2005, 2006)
- Dears, The (2003, 2007)
- Ani DiFranco (2007, 2009)
- Julie Doiron (2001, 2009)
- Gord Downie (2001, 2010)
- Feist (2000, 2006, 2014)
- Ferron
- Final Fantasy (2006, 2009)
- Priyanka (2023)
- Sarah Harmer (2003, 2006, 2010, Inside 2011, 2017)
- Hawksley Workman (2001, 2008)
- Hayden (2002, 2008)
- Hey Rosetta! 2014 (Inside 2015)
- Hidden Cameras, The
- Hollerado (2011, 2014)
- Islands (2008)
- k-os (2002, 2005 surprise guest)
- K'naan (Inside 2009)
- Lights (2008, 2011)
- Los Campesinos! (2007)
- Los Lobos (2010)
- Lowest of the Low, The (2005,2013)
- Loreena McKennitt (2009)
- Sarah McLachlan
- Metric (2003, 2004)
- Danny Michel (2022, 2014, 2008, 2003, 2001)
- Mt. Joy (2017)
- Joel Plaskett (2012)
- Serena Ryder (2002, 2011)
- Sam Roberts (2005, Inside 2009)
- Xavier Rudd (2006, Inside 2008, 2009, 2017)
- Sadies, The (2008, 2016)
- Buffy Sainte-Marie (2009, 2016)
- Tokyo Police Club (Inside 2008, 2009)
- Jane Siberry/Issa (1993, 2009)
- Sarah Slean (2005, 2008)
- Sloan (1999, 2011)
- Stars (2005, Inside 2009, 2010)
- Stills, The (2006)
- Weakerthans, The (2002, 2006, Inside 2008)
- Wintersleep (2006, Inside 2008, 2013)
- Yukon Blonde (2010, 2013)
- Zeus (2010, 2012)
- Weaves (2017)
- Walk Off the Earth (2012)
- Lizzie No (2022)
- Julian Taylor (2022)

Notable spoken word artists who performed at the festival include Sandra Alland (2005), Stuart McLean (2008), Robert Priest (2005), Tony Leighton (2007, 2008), Tom King (2007), and Shane Koyczan (2010, Inside 2011, 2013). Barenaked Ladies played a concert before the festival to celebrate the construction of the permanent Hillside main stage that had recently been built.
