= Centre Inn, Ontario =

Centre Inn
- Unincorporated rural community
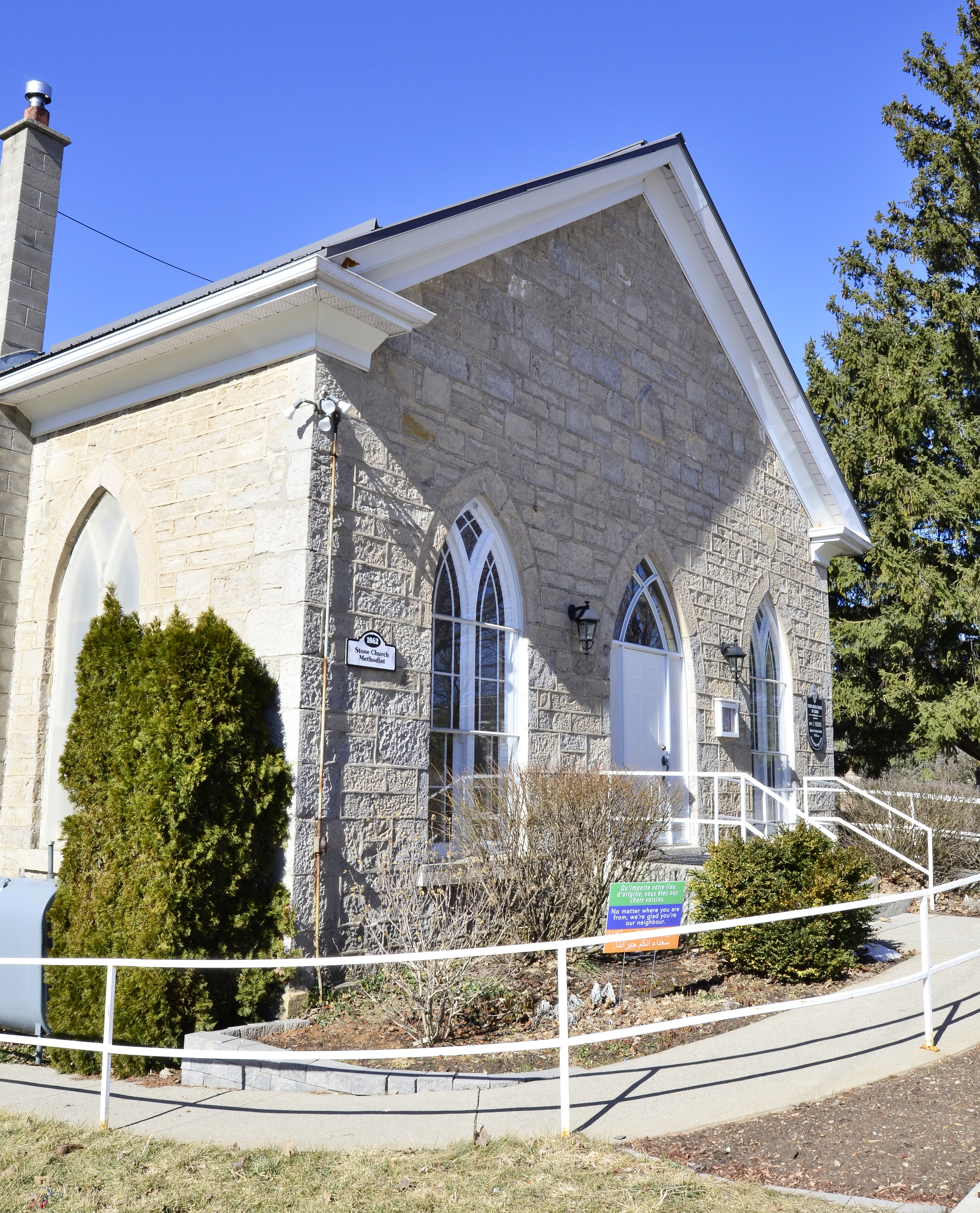
- Stone United Church in Centre Inn
- Interactive map of Centre Inn
- Coordinates: 43°38′19″N 80°11′48″W
- Country: Canada
- Province: Ontario
- County: Wellington
- Township: Guelph/Eramosa
- Time zone: UTC-5 (Eastern (EST))
  - Summer (DST): UTC-4 (EDT)
- GNBC Code: FAPQS

Centre Inn is an unincorporated rural community in Guelph/Eramosa Township, Wellington County, Ontario, Canada.

== History ==
Henry Duffield arrived in Eramosa Township in 1832, and was a leading land owner who later served as reeve of Eramosa Township. Duffield owned 100 acres (40 ha) of land on the corner of Fourth Line and Eramosa Road, the location which became known as Centre Inn.

The Centre Inn name was chosen because of its location in the centre of Eramosa Township.

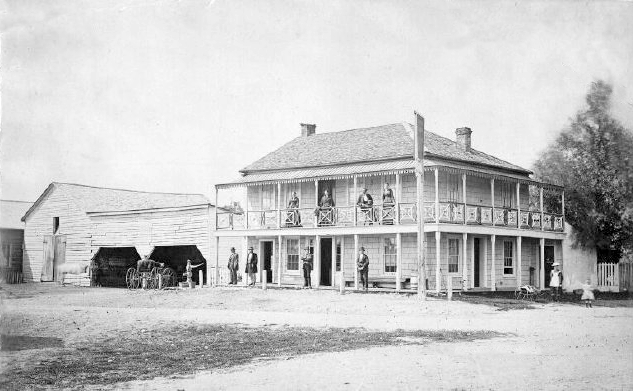
Hotel in Centre Inn, circa 1880

A hotel was operated on the main corner of Centre Inn, and was used by people travelling by horse-drawn carriage between Erin and Guelph. A covered wagon carrying mail and passengers between those locations would stop at Centre Inn to board passengers. The passenger service continued after rural mail survive began. The hotel was used for meetings by local groups, such as the South Wellington Teachers' Association, which met at Centre Inn in 1864, and the Eramosa Township Council, which held meetings at Centre Inn from the 1870s to 1890s.

In 1833, John Loree donated land to establish the Centre Inn Cemetery. That same year, his brother Hezekiah was the first interment. A wooden frame church, the Methodist Episcopal Church, was erected next to the cemetery. In 1862, an extant stone church was erected "on top of several tombstones". In 1964, extensive renovations were made to what is now called Stone United Church. The cemetery closed around 1975.

George Caughlin had a 296-acre (120 ha) farm in Centre Inn with a race track. A barn was built in 1879, and a farmhouse in 1881.

The hotel was abandoned in the early 1890s, and was purchased in 1905 to be used as a home by Alex Hyndman and his family. One of the buildings on the property was temporarily used as a school in 1905.

A property near the corner was purchased in 1920, and a sawmill operated there.

Eramosa Road was widened in 1950 and renamed Highway 24 (now called Highway 124). This required the former hotel building to be moved back from the corner.

In 1964, the Center Inn Softball Club won the Ontario Rural Softball Association championship.
