= Timber Framers Guild =

United States woodworking organization

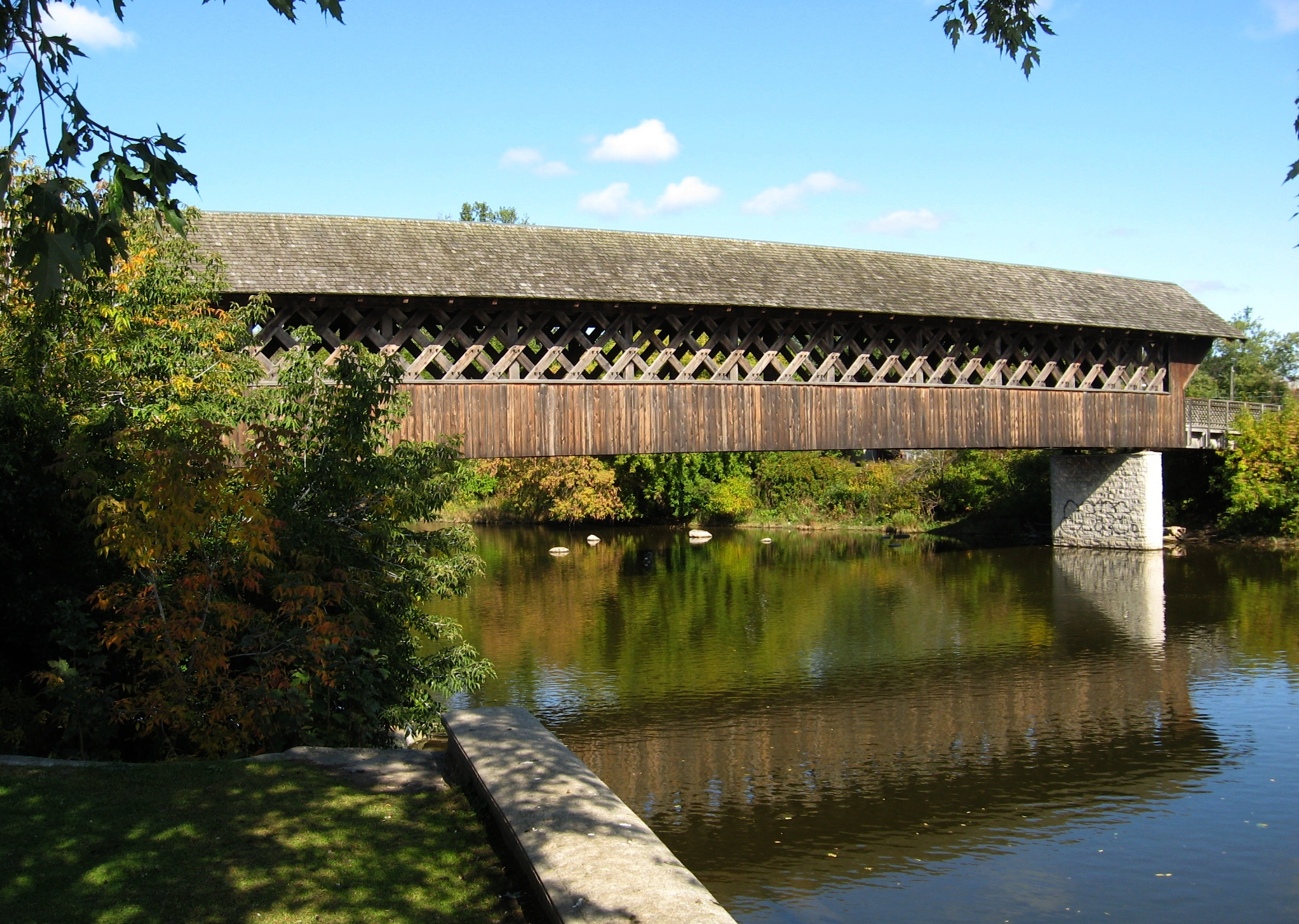
This covered bridge near Guelph, Ontario, Canada was a Guild project in 1992

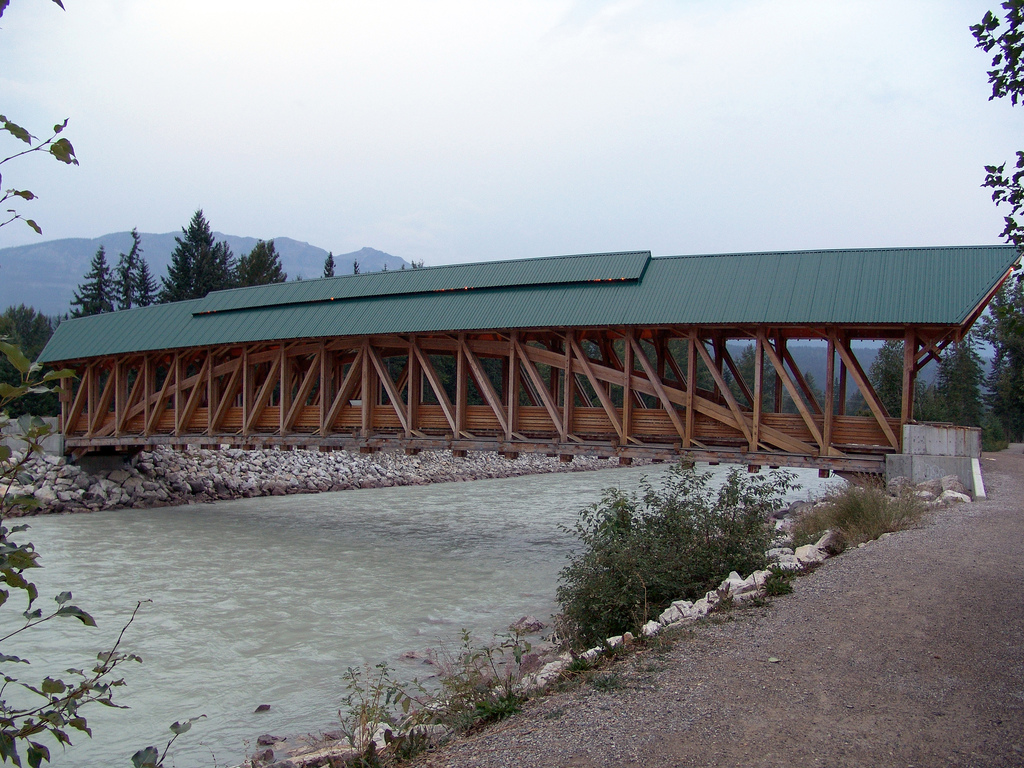
Kicking Horse Pedestrian Bridge, Golden, British Columbia, completed in September 2001, is the longest freestanding timber frame bridge in Canada

The Timber Framers Guild (the Guild) is a non-profit, international, membership organization established in 1985 in the United States to improve the quality and education of people practicing the millennia-old art of Timber framing buildings and other structures with beams joined with primarily wooden joints. Today the stated goals of the Guild are to provide "... national and regional conferences, sponsoring projects and workshops, and publishing a monthly newsletter, Scantlings, and a quarterly journal, Timber Framing " In 2019, the Guild purchased the Heartwood School, which had been established in 1978 to teach skills and knowledge required for building energy-efficient homes and now focuses on timber framing, serving beginning to advanced students.

The Guild focuses on education, and while it is not directly associated with the United Brotherhood of Carpenters and Joiners of America, it works closely with similar organizations. Overseas collaborators have included the Carpenters Fellowship in the U. K., Compagnons du Tour de France in France, and Zimmerman in Germany (a German language site). Originally the Guild was named the Timber Framers Guild of North America but the "North America" was dropped in recognition of the Guild's international presence.

== Membership ==
Membership in the Guild does not necessarily reflect competency but an interest in construction, learning and/or teaching. Members are not required to practice timber framing. Most members build new timber frames, but many members restore, rehabilitate, preserve and/or study historic timber-framed buildings. The Guild also has institutional members, primarily corporations, and other partners include public agencies, educational institutions, and nonprofit organizations. The philosophies vary widely with some members being innovative and designing buildings of the future, some use computer-controlled machinery to cut frames, some work only with traditional hand-powered tools. Some members use metal connectors rather than traditional wooden joinery.

== Sub-groups within or associated with the Guild ==
- Traditional Timberframe Research and Advisory Group (TTRAG): Part of the Timber Framers Guild officially formed in 1990.

The TTRAG group produced survey guidelines for recording historic timber-framed buildings.

- "The Timber Frame Engineering Council (TFEC) formed in 2005 at a Guild conference in recognition of the considerable number of structural engineers among the Guild membership and in response to a felt need for systematic research, discussion and codification of timber frame joinery and structural practices."

The TFEC has developed a Standard for the Design of Timber Framed Structures as a "...supplement to provisions of the National Design Specification for Wood Construction..." to assist engineers in this design specialty.

- Timber Frame Business Council: A non-profit body focused on the business of timber framing.

== Conferences ==
The Guild has held annual conferences and meetings since the 1980s at locations across North America. It also convenes regional meetings, workshops and community-building projects.

== Apprenticeship Program ==
The Guild created a training program for apprentices to learn the art and science of traditional timber framing from mentors called journeyworkers. This program uses a formal curriculum which is being revised.

== Publications ==
The Guild publishes a newsletter for members, a respected journal Timber Framing, and books on the specialized topics of traditional timber framing. The Guild also lists other relevant books, software and a Glossary of timber framing terms. An important record of historic timber frame joints found in the U.S.A. is Historic American Timber Joinery: A Graphic Guide which was partially funded by a grant from National Park Service and the National Center for Preservation Technology and Training and thus are available for free download. This guide is expanding as new types of joints are found and recorded.

== Forum ==
An online, public forum is managed for anyone to search for past discussions or ask questions.

== Leadership ==
The Guild is led by a volunteer Board which is elected by the membership. The Board of Directors consists of 12 positions, including President, Vice President, Clerk and Treasurer. The Board is responsible for hiring the executive director.

== See also ==
- Timber roof trusses
- Barn raising
- Pike pole
- Mortise and tenon
- Barn
