= Speed River =

River in Canada

Coordinates: 43°23′15″N 80°22′1.5″W

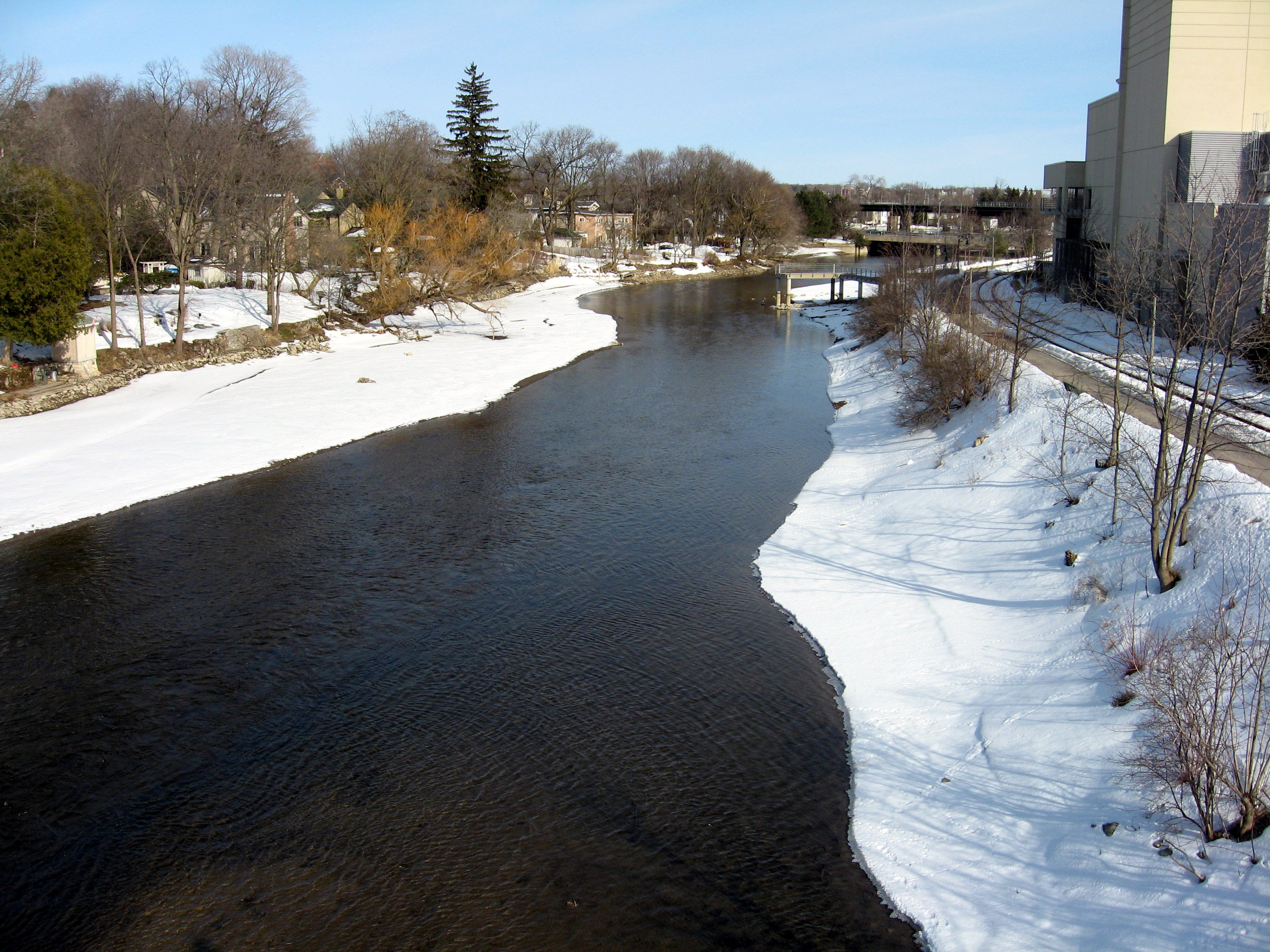
- The Speed River flowing east through Guelph, Ontario in April, 2008

Location
- Country: Canada
- Province: Ontario

Physical characteristics
- Source
  - location: Orton, Ontario
- Mouth
  - location: Grand River at Cambridge

The Speed River is a river that flows through Wellington County and the Region of Waterloo in southwestern Ontario, Canada. It flows south from its source near Orton, through Guelph, where it is joined by the Eramosa River, then through the towns of Hespeler and Preston, finally uniting with the Grand River in north-west Cambridge.

== Guelph Lake ==
North of Guelph, Guelph Lake was formed as a result of the river being dammed. The dam is one of several features on the river used to prevent flooding in spring. Excess runoff is collected in the 1,700-acre (6.9 km^{2}) Guelph Lake Reservoir which is drained in the previous autumn, and in summer the water is released slowly to regulate the flow of the river. Guelph Lake Conservation Area is on the shore of Guelph Lake. It is owned and managed by the Grand River Conservation Authority.

== Parks and conservation areas ==
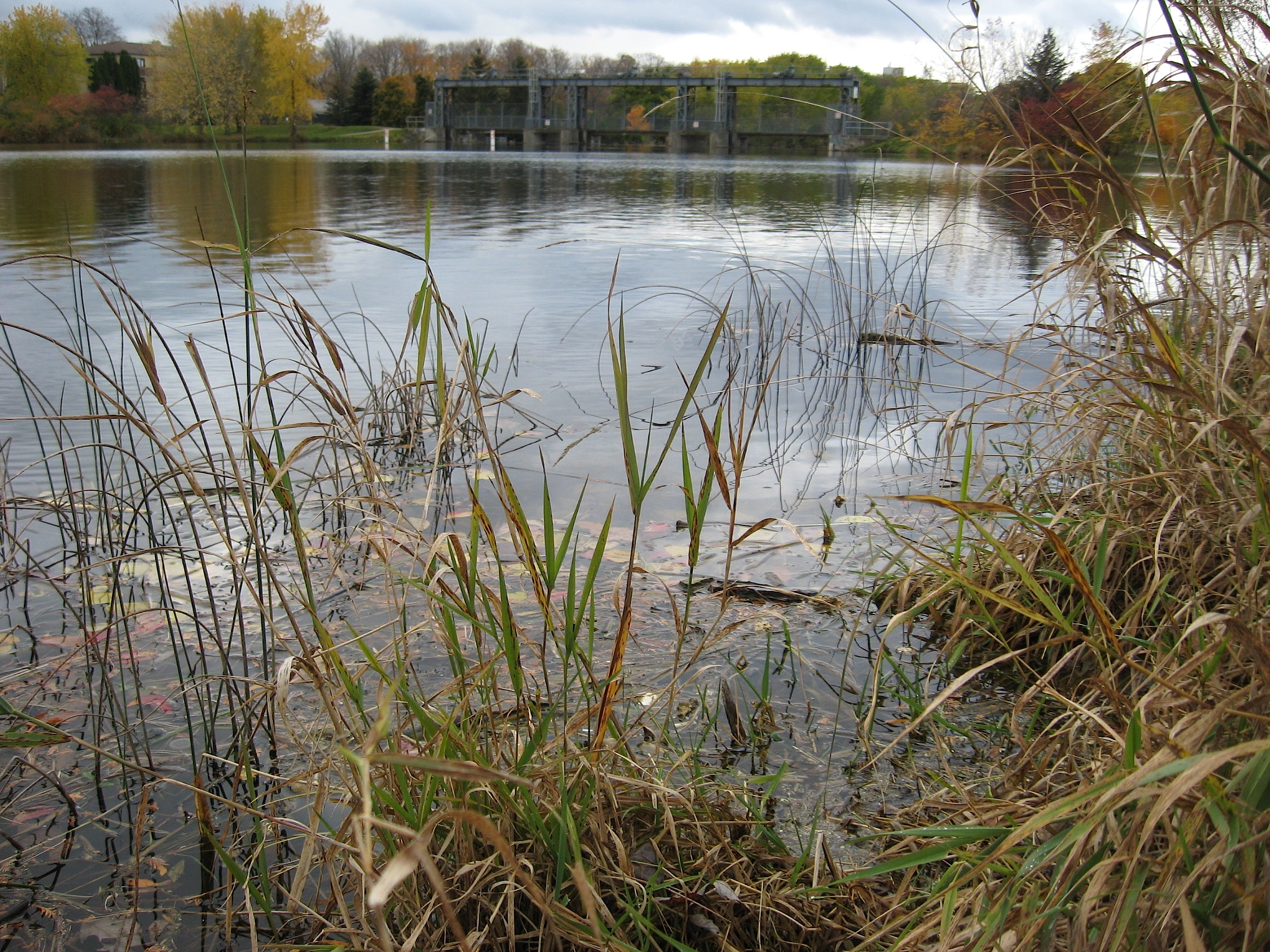
Riparian restoration along n. bank of Speed, Guelph, Oct. 2008

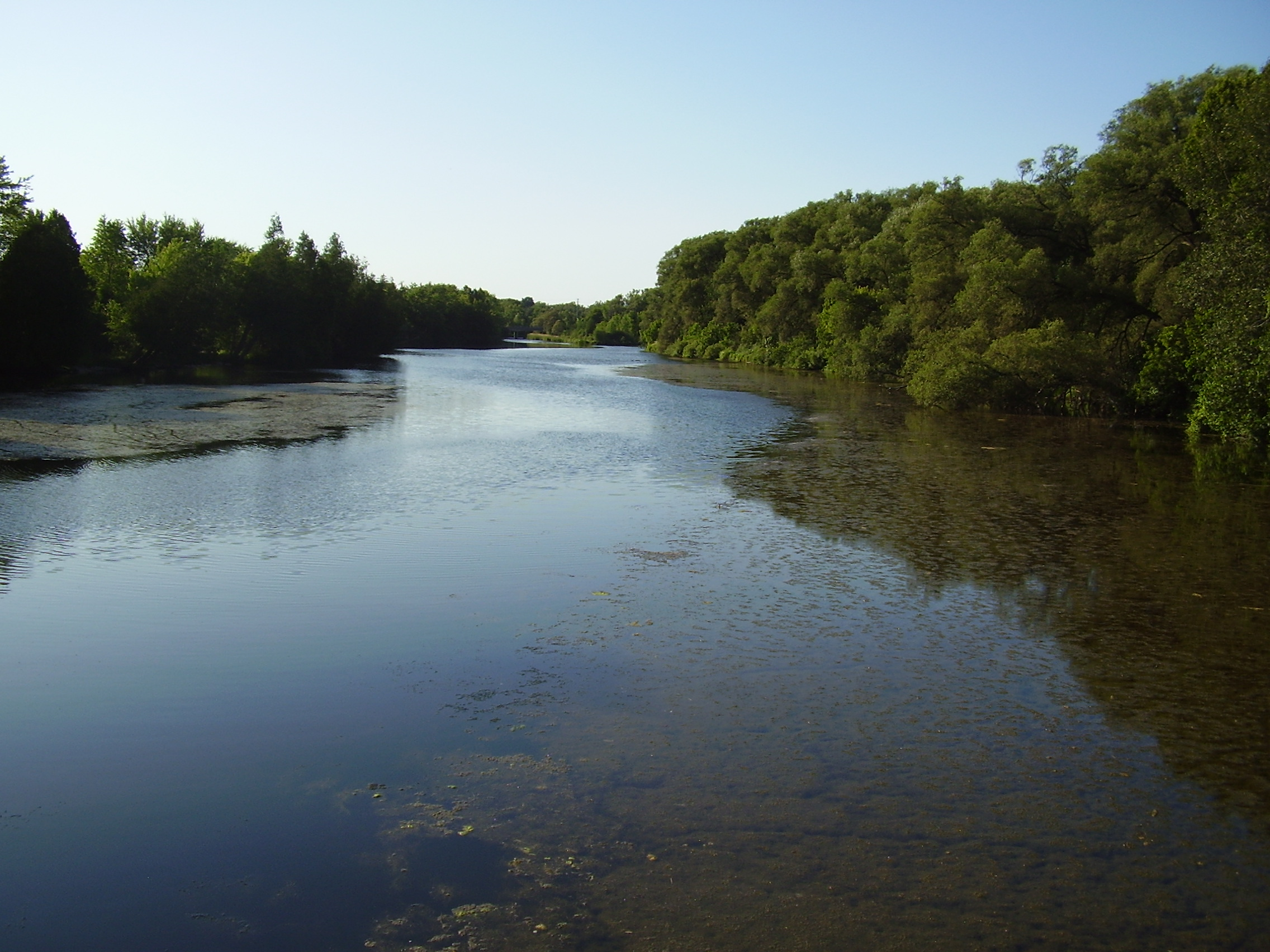
Another view of the Speed River in the city of Guelph. Taken from the footbridge in Riverside Park, looking upstream (north); July 2009

Riverside Park in Guelph, Ontario, is built beside the Speed River. It forms part of an attempted natural buffer along the Speed: "OPIRG-Guelph and other community groups have worked, in partnership with the City to rehabilitate the local river environment. Today, the river's edge is allowed to naturalize, benefiting the environment and saving maintenance. The City of Guelph's River Systems Management Plan is a positive approach to river management [whose] vision is to protect the rivers' role within the city, by featuring them in urban design, and enhancing and protecting ecological diversity, while providing beneficial uses for the community." Chemical pesticides, herbicides and fertilizers have been abandoned, in an effort of produce a narrow buffer strip within the thirty meter "riparian zone" between the rivers and their surrounding parklands, including river paths. "The buffer provides food, habitat, and a corridor for wildlife, as well as improving water quality by minimizing erosion, acting as a filter and providing shade, to lower water temperature", increasing oxygen, thus decreasing algae and bacterial contents.

In the town of Hespeler, part of Cambridge, there are several parks on the banks of the Speed River, such as Jacob's Landing, Chillago Conservation Area, Hespeler Mill Pond and Ellacott Lookout. The former site of Idylwild Park is on the Speed River in Cambridge (Hespeler), and includes the portion that now Chillago Conservation Area.

Riverside Park Cambridge lies on the west bank in Preston. Linear Park, in Cambridge, lies at the confluence of the Speed and Grand rivers.

== Fishing ==
There are several species of fish in the Speed River, including, smallmouth bass, largemouth bass, rainbow, brown and brook trout, northern pike, bullhead, carp and panfish. As of January 2011, efforts are being made to restore the extirpated populations of all trout species to the Speed River in Guelph. Fish impediments, such as dams, have contributed to increasing water temperature and the prevention of migration during spawning, both of which are and continue to be a reason why no trout have been caught in Guelph in decades. Guelph Lake is popular for fishing yellow perch and pike. Although the GRCA hosted ice fishing on Guelph Lake in the past, they no longer do so and the lake, along with the rest of the conservation area it is a part of, is now considered off-limits during the winter.

== See also ==
- List of rivers of Ontario
