= Dalen (disambiguation) =

Dalen is a word that means "the valley" in Norwegian and Swedish. It may refer to:

== People ==
- Dalen Cambre (born 2001), American football player
- Dalen Lance (born 1983), South African actor and presenter
- Dalen Mmako (born 1996), South African cricketer
- Dalen Terry (born 2002), American basketball player
- Andrea Dalen (born 1992), Norwegian ice hockey player
- Frieda Dalen (1895–1995), Norwegian teacher
- Gustaf Dalén (1869–1937), Swedish physicist and businessman
- Olav Dalen (born 1985), Norwegian football player
- Sidsel Dalen (born 1969), Norwegian journalist and crime fiction writer
- Zale Dalen, Canadian film and television director

== Places ==
- Dalen, a village and a former municipality in the northeastern Netherlands
- Dalen, Telemark, a village in Tokke municipality in Telemark county, Norway
  - Dalen Church, a church in Dalen, Telemark
  - Dalen Hotel, a historic hotel located at Dalen, Telemark
- Dalen, the German name for the town of Tomislavgrad in Bosnia and Herzegovina

== Sport ==
- Dalen/Krokslätts FF, a football club in Mölndal, Sweden
- IBK Dalen, a floorball club in Umeå, Sweden
- HC Dalen, an ice hockey club in Jönköping, Sweden

== Other ==
- Dalen Portland, a novel by Kjartan Fløgstad
- Dalén light, a light produced from burning of carbide gas

== See also ==
- Dirck Dalens the Elder (1600–1676), Dutch painter
- Dirk Dalens (1657–1687), Dutch painter
- Van Dalen, a list of people whose name is Van Dalen
