= Jan Ekels =

Jan Ekels may refer to:

- Jan Ekels the Elder (1724–1781), Dutch painter
- Jan Ekels the Younger (1759–1793), Dutch painter
