= Van Daele =

Van Daele is a Dutch toponymic surname. It is most common in the Belgian province of East Flanders. The agglutinated form Vandaele is most common in West Flanders. Notable people with these surnames include:

== Van Daele ==
- August Van Daele (1944–2017), Belgian Chief of Defence 2002–2009
- Edmond Van Daële (1884–1960), pseudonym of the French actor Edmond Minckwitz
- Frans van Daele (born 1947), Belgian dignitary
- Jo Van Daele (born 1972), Belgian discus thrower
- Joop van Daele (1947–2025), Dutch footballer
- Joseph Van Daele (1889–1948), Belgian racing cyclist
- Kaat Van Daele (born 1989), Belgian figure skater
- Shawn Van Daele, Canadian photographer

== Vandaele ==
- Leon Vandaele (1933–2000), Belgian racing cyclist
- Wilfried Vandaele (born 1959), Belgian New Flemish Alliance politician

== See also ==
- Van Dalen, Dutch surname
