= Adam Silo =

Dutch painter

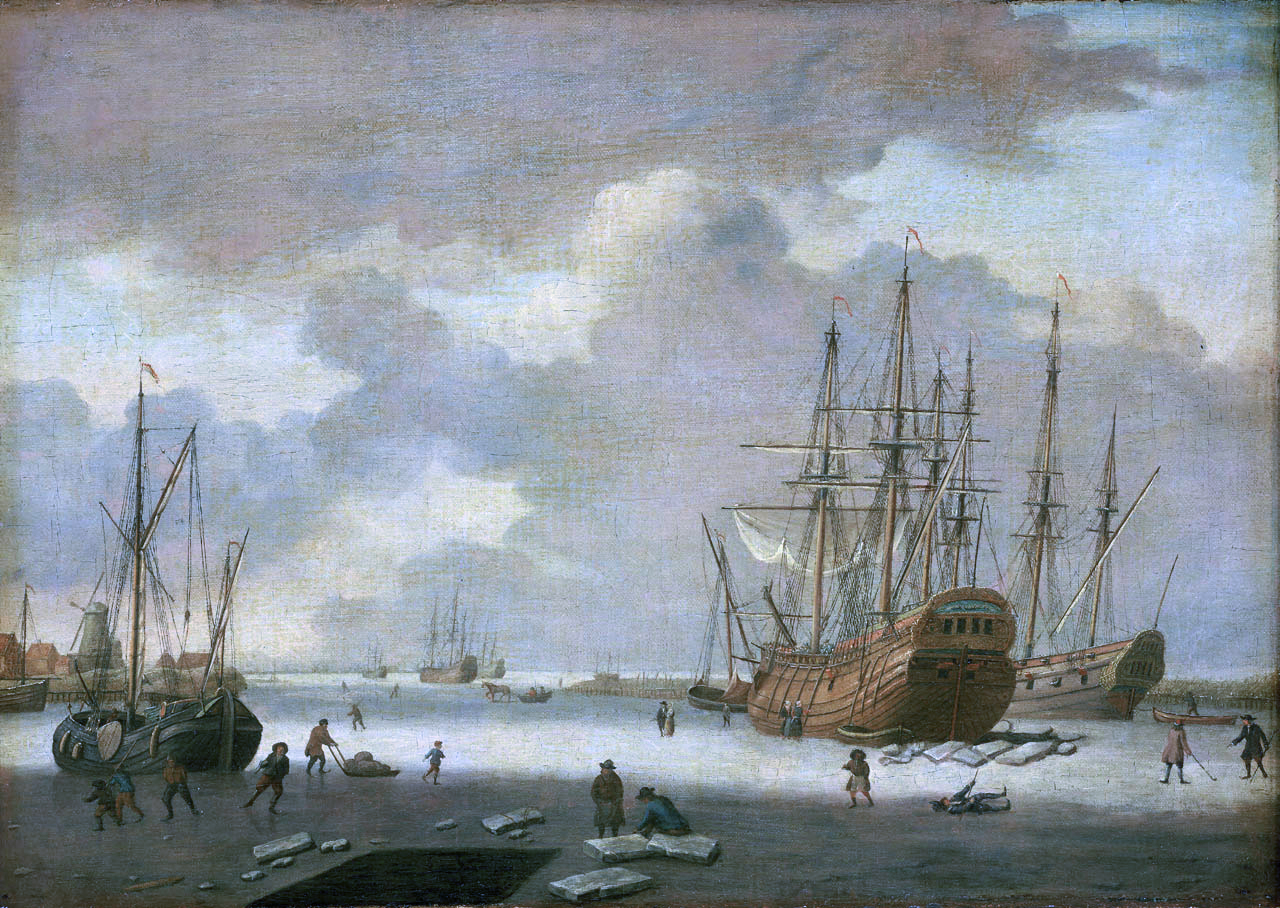
Adam Silo: Dutch Whaler and Other Vessels in the Ice Oil painting, circa 1757 National Maritime Museum, London

Adam Silo (25 December 1674 – 1760) was a Dutch painter who specialized in maritime scenes – particularly naval ships, but also trading and whaling vessels. He also wrote books on art and gave drawing lessons to Russian Tsar Peter the Great.

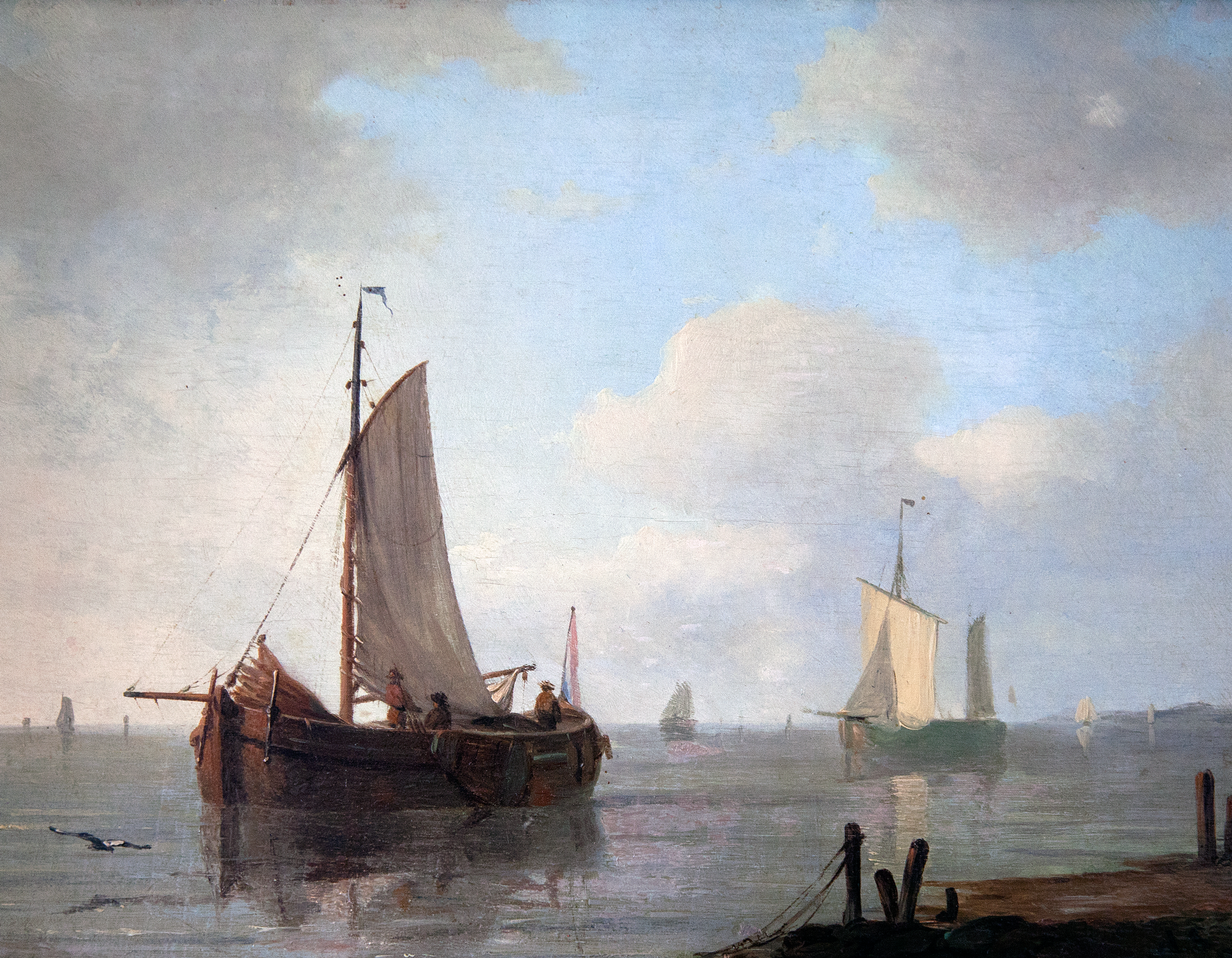
Adam Silo: Dutch barges on the IJ near Amsterdam Oil painting, circa 1745 private collection

Paintings by Silo can be found at the Amsterdams Historisch Museum in Amsterdam, the Maritiem Museum Rotterdam, the Hermitage in Saint Petersburg, the National Maritime Museum in London and the Kunsthistorisches Museum in Vienna, among others. The Hermitage, for instance, has a 1730s work by Silo showing fleet maneuvers in the Zuiderzee during Peter the Great's visit to Amsterdam. The Amsterdams Historisch Museum has the only dated painting by Silo, showing a fleet of whalers off Amsterdam: Het IJ met een vloot walvisvaarders gezien vanaf het bolwerk Blauwhoofd (1729).

Silo was born in Amsterdam on Christmas Day, 1674. At the age of 21, when he married, he was making gold thread and also worked as a ship's carpenter. He later worked, until the age of 30, as a master ship's builder and sea captain. Around 1694, he became a pupil of the artist Theodor van Pee (c. 1668–1746) and learned to paint.

In 1697, he gave instruction in the drawing of ships to Peter the Great, who was visiting Amsterdam at the time. Notes made by the tsar during these lessons have survived. Peter the Great also purchased some of Silo's paintings.

Silo produced not only paintings but also prints and drawings, which also exclusively depicted maritime scenes. Over 20 etchings by Silo are known. He also experimented with the mezzotint technique. In his later years, he worked as an instrument builder, making musical instruments, binoculars, magnifying glasses, and telescopes, among others. He also produced wax models.

Silo wrote a number of books, including Afteekeningen van verscheidene soorten en charters van schepen en andere vaartuigen ("Drawings of various types of ships and other vessels", 1757).

He died in Amsterdam in 1760 at the age of 85 and was buried on 8 October 1760 at the Leidse Kerkhof cemetery in Amsterdam.

== Sources ==
- Artnet / Grove Dictionary of Art
- Kollenburg Antiquairs (Dutch, archived)
- Jan Wagenaar, Amsterdam in zyne opkomst, aanwas, geschiedenissen, voorregten, koophandel, gebouwen, kerkenstaat, schoolen, schutterye, gilden en regeeringe (1767), deel 11, pp. 435–436 (Dutch)
- Hendrick Collot d'Escury van Heinenoord, Holland's roem in kunsten en wetenschappen (1826), deel 3, p. 29 (Dutch)
- Jacobus Kok, Vaderlandsch woordenboek (1792), deel 27-28, p. 83 (Dutch)
