= Eden Mills, Ontario =

Eden Mills
- Unincorporated community
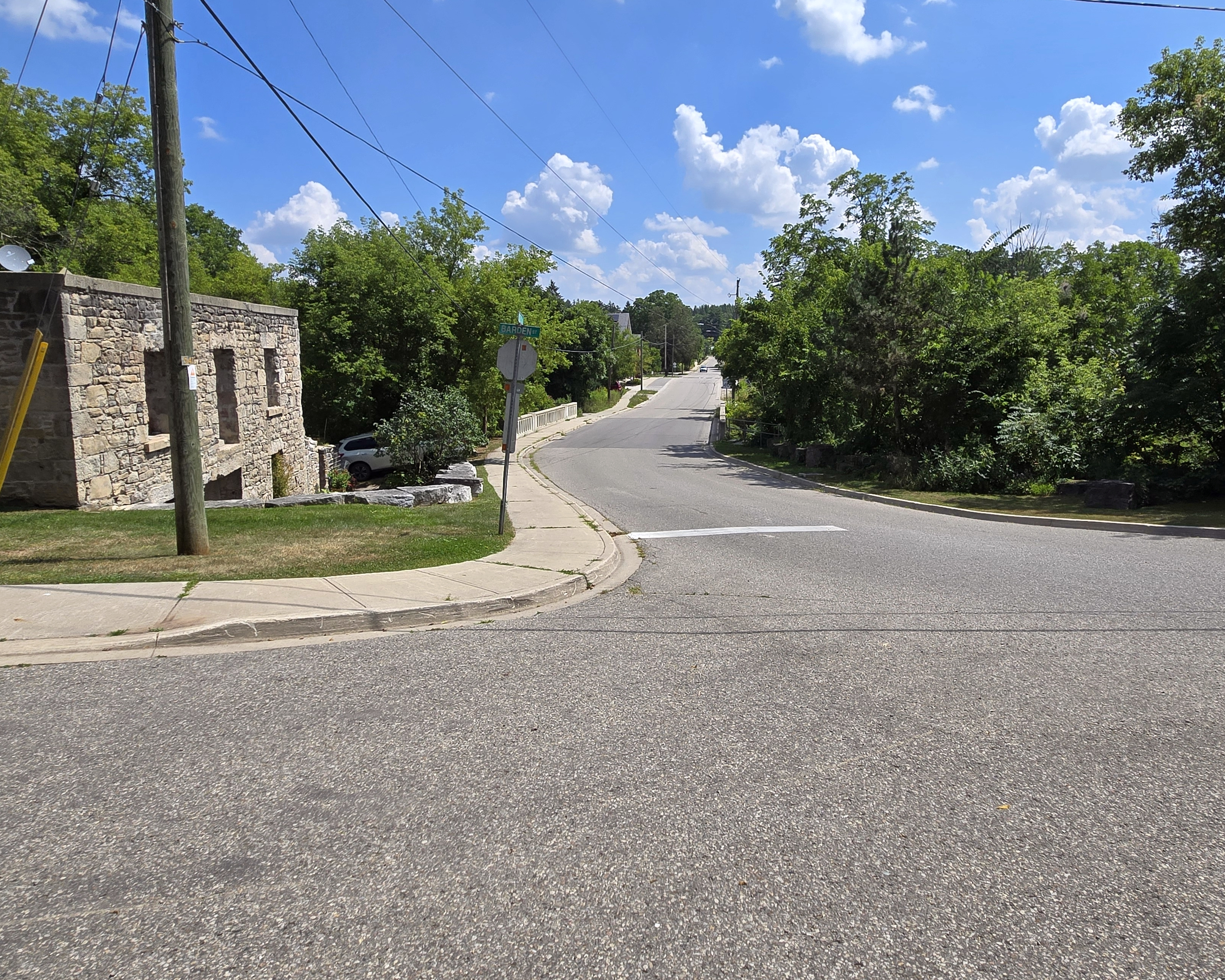
- York Street in Eden Mills

- Location within Wellington County Location within Southern Ontario
- Coordinates: 43°34′43″N 80°08′36″W
- Country: Canada
- Province: Ontario
- County: Wellington
- Township: Guelph/Eramosa
- Time zone: UTC-5 (Eastern (EST))
  - Summer (DST): UTC-4 (EDT)
- GNBC Code: FBBQT

Eden Mills is an unincorporated community in the Township of Guelph/Eramosa, Wellington County, Ontario, Canada.

Located on the Eramosa River, the Eden Mills Writers' Festival is an annual event.

== History ==
The settlement was founded in 1842 by the Kribbs family, who built a mill on the Eramosa River. First called "Kribbs Mill", it was renamed "Eden Mills" in 1846, when the new mill owner described the location as "beautiful as the Garden of Eden". The early settlement had a post office, blacksmith, hotel, general store, taxidermist, oatmeal mill, several saw mills, and a community hall, erected around 1893.

The population in 1902 was 300.

The Toronto Suburban Railway was built to Guelph in 1917, with a stop in Eden Mills. The railway enabled local farmers to ship produce to Toronto, and Eden Mills became a recreational destination for train travellers. Around 1924, Edgewood Park was built near the railway station to attract visitors, and featured a baseball diamond, picnic area, cottages, a dance hall, and in 1928, a swimming pool. The park was purchased in 1944 by the Lutheran Church of the Canada as a summer youth camp, and in 2017, the camp ceased operation and was sold to the Eden Mills River Conservation Authority.

In 1930, the railway ceased operations, and Eden Mills became a police village (a form of municipal government previously used in Ontario).

Eden Mills Writers' Festival is an annual event founded in 1989.

== Demographics ==
In the 1991 Census of Population conducted by Statistics Canada, Eden Mills had an estimated population of 319.

Population history of Eden Mills

Year	Pop.	±%
1941	164	—
1951	200	+22.0%
1956	247	+23.5%
1961	288	+16.6%
1966	314	+9.0%

Year	Pop.	±%
1971	359	+14.3%
1976	332	−7.5%
1986	439	+32.2%
1991E	319	−27.3%

Source: Statistics Canada

== Notable people ==
- David Boyle, archeologist.
- Michael Faulds, football player and coach.
- Shawn Van Daele, artist.
