= Jan van Pee =

Dutch painter

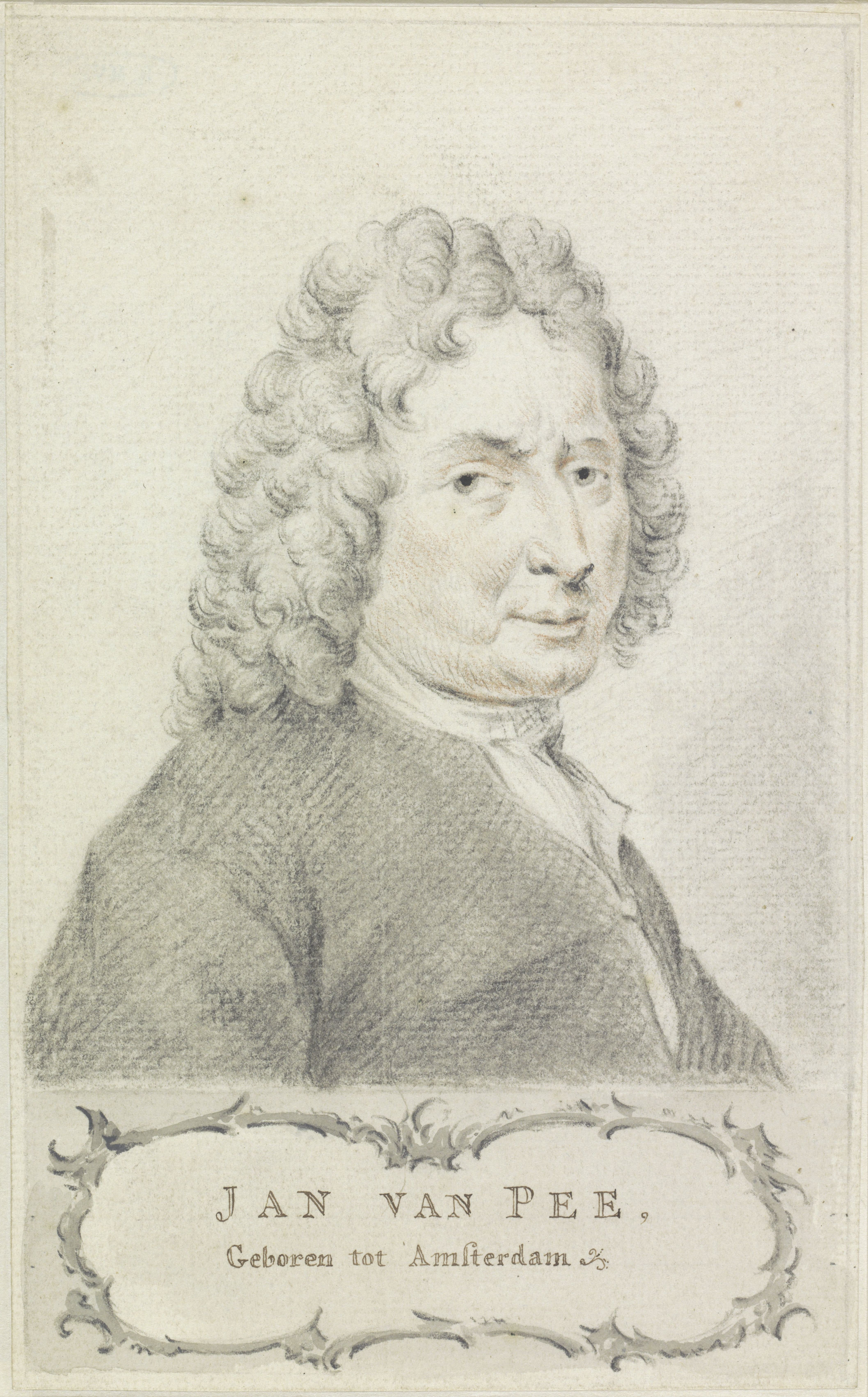
Self-portrait of Jan van Pee

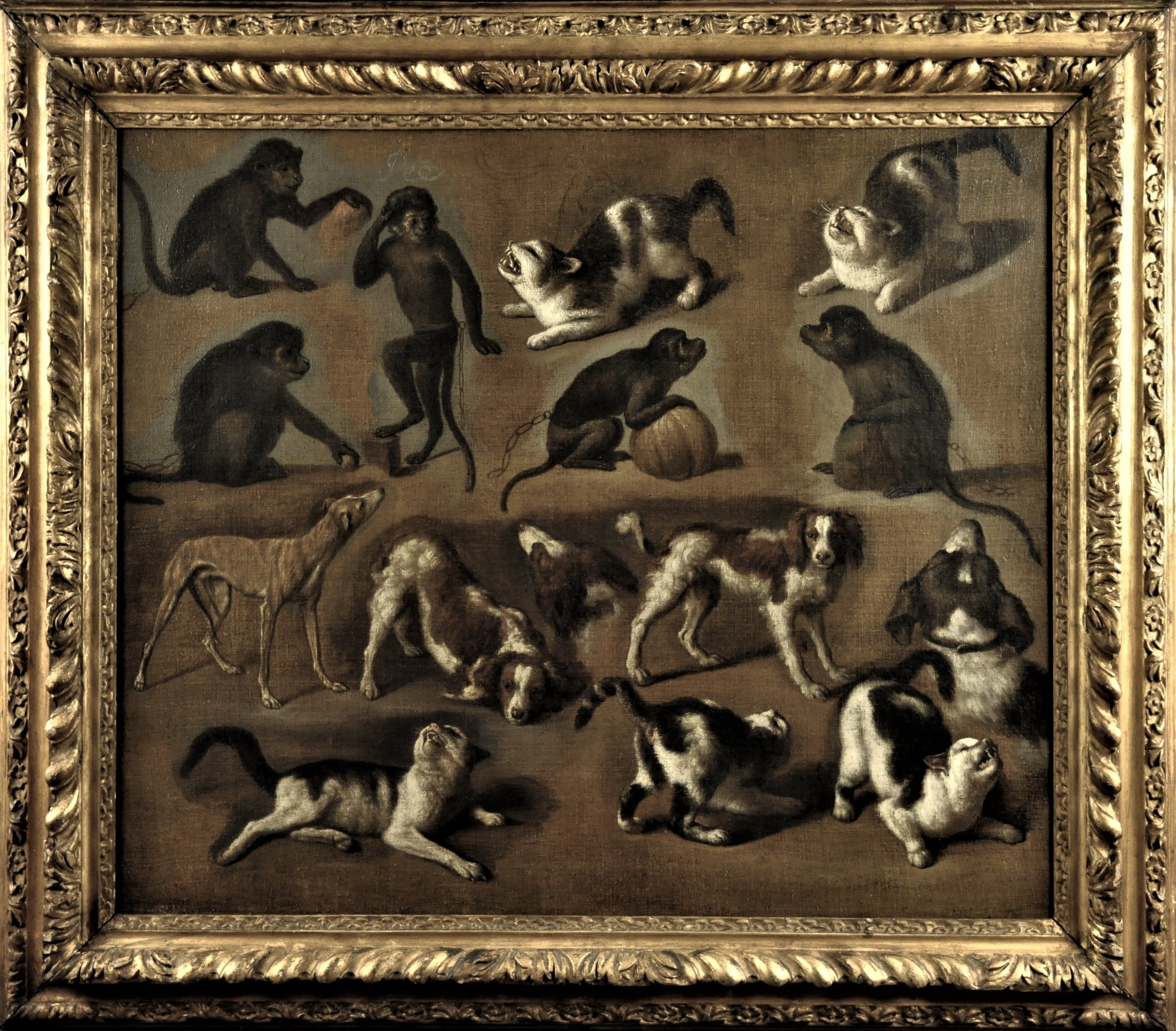
A Study of Cats, Dogs and Monkeys by Jan van Pee.

Jan van Pee (1630, Amsterdam – 1710, Antwerp), was a Dutch Golden Age art dealer and genre painter.

== Biography ==
According to Houbraken he was the son of the Amsterdam art dealer Emanuel van Pee, a man with a title of lower nobility, whose father Justus van Pee of Brussels had been the private secretary of Margaret of Parma. Justus van Pee had been trained as a painter but was too nearsighted for the work. As a private secretary he astonished everyone by being able to read letters in the dark better than anyone else, despite his near-sightedness. Though his father had earned a title, there was little inheritance left for Emanuel when he died, so Emanuel started an art dealership to make a living, and moved to Amsterdam, where Jan van Pee was born and where he starting working for his father at a young age making copies of small cabinet paintings ("Dozynwerk", or "works of a dozen"). When Jan came of age, he married Hendrika Matthysdr in 1657 in Leiden and they had children, but he regretted that he never visited Antwerp to admire the paintings there. His wife would never allow him.

He was urged to make a trip by his acquaintance, a pupil of Evert van Aelst called De Nys. Jan van Pee decided to go, but needed money for the trip. Since he was only allowed the key to the money safe if he went shopping, he told his wife to put the water to boil for a fish and that he was going to the fish market to buy one. He took ten ducats and a few clean shirts and he and De Nys promptly took the trekschuit to Haarlem, where he wrote a letter to his wife that on his way to market he was offered work in Haarlem, but on arrival in Haarlem, his patron requested that he make the commission in the style of P.P. Rubens and requested him to go to Antwerp. Then he and De Nys travelled via Leiden and Rotterdam to Antwerp, where they went to all of the churches and monasteries to admire the work of Rubens, Jordaens, and Van Dijk. When they saw that one could sell paintings for ready cash on the Friday market, they bought paint, brushes and supplies and made two paintings. Pee hired a beggar to sit for an allegorical painting of Saint Peter, while De Nys bought some dead birds to make a hunting still life. They both sold and financed their trip this way, Pee earning 16 ducats and De Nys 18 ducats. Van Pee again sent a letter to his wife requesting her to move the household to Antwerp, but she refused and claimed the art dealership was doing fine and she preferred to stay with her children in Amsterdam, where she had no need of him at all. Van Pee finally returned North after eight months time, and when he arrived in Amsterdam he first bought a fish at the market to take to his wife.

In 1659 he lived in Amsterdam. Van Pee was specialized as a copyist of Italian paintings and worked for Gerrit van Uylenburgh. when Gerard de Lairesse arrived in 1667. Van Pee also made genre scenes of his own invention, and he is known to have created a number of well-painted oil studies of animals, usually closely grouped on a buff coloured ground.

Van Pee was the teacher of his son Theodor or Dirck van Pee, born in 1669 and the grandfather of the miniature painter Henriëtta van Pee. From 1684 he is registered in the Antwerp Guild of St. Luke with many pupils.
