= Dirk Dalens III =

Dutch landscape painter

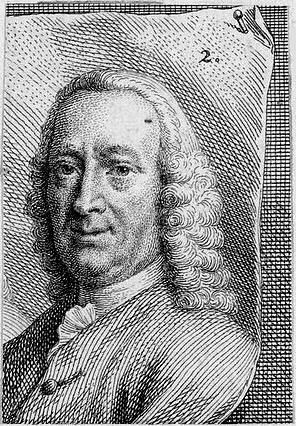
Dirk Dalens, portrait by Aert Schouman for Jan van Gool's dictionary of artist biographies, 1751

Dirck Dalens III (1688 – 1753), was a Dutch landscape painter.

== Biography ==
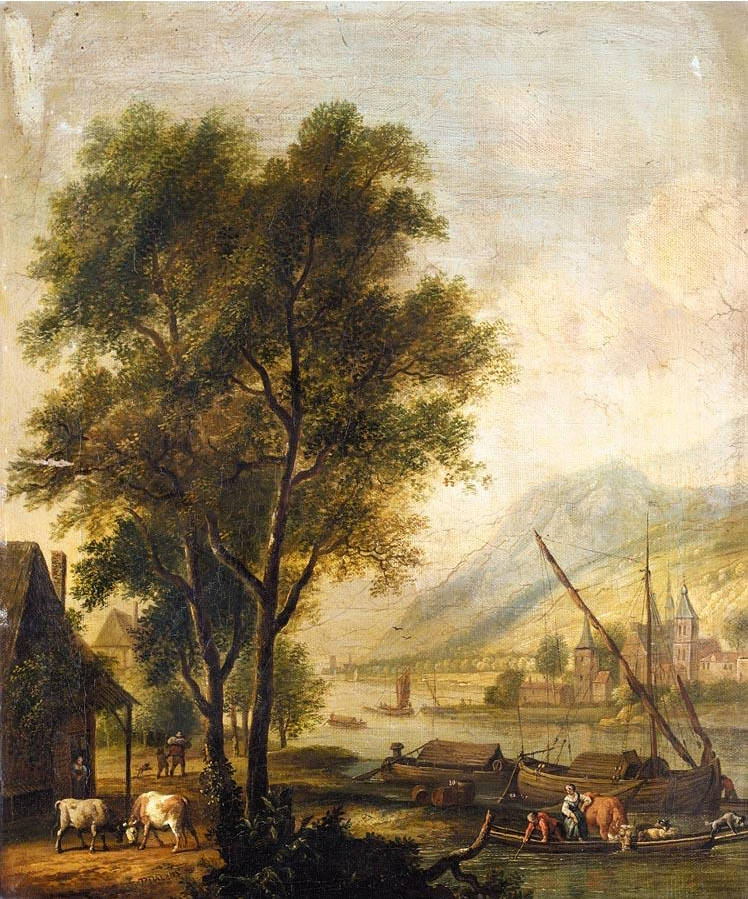
River landscape with figures

He was born in Amsterdam as the son of Dirck II, who died before he was born. He was the pupil of Theodor van Pee, but left him to pursue a career in landscape painting like his father had done. He painted wall decorations for the owners of stately homes in the Netherlands. His best known works still exist in the city of leiden, these "gardenrooms" are now inhabited by students. His pupils were Jan ten Compe and Jan Ekels the Elder. He died in Amsterdam and was buried in the Westerkerk.
