= Moses van Uyttenbroeck =

Dutch painter

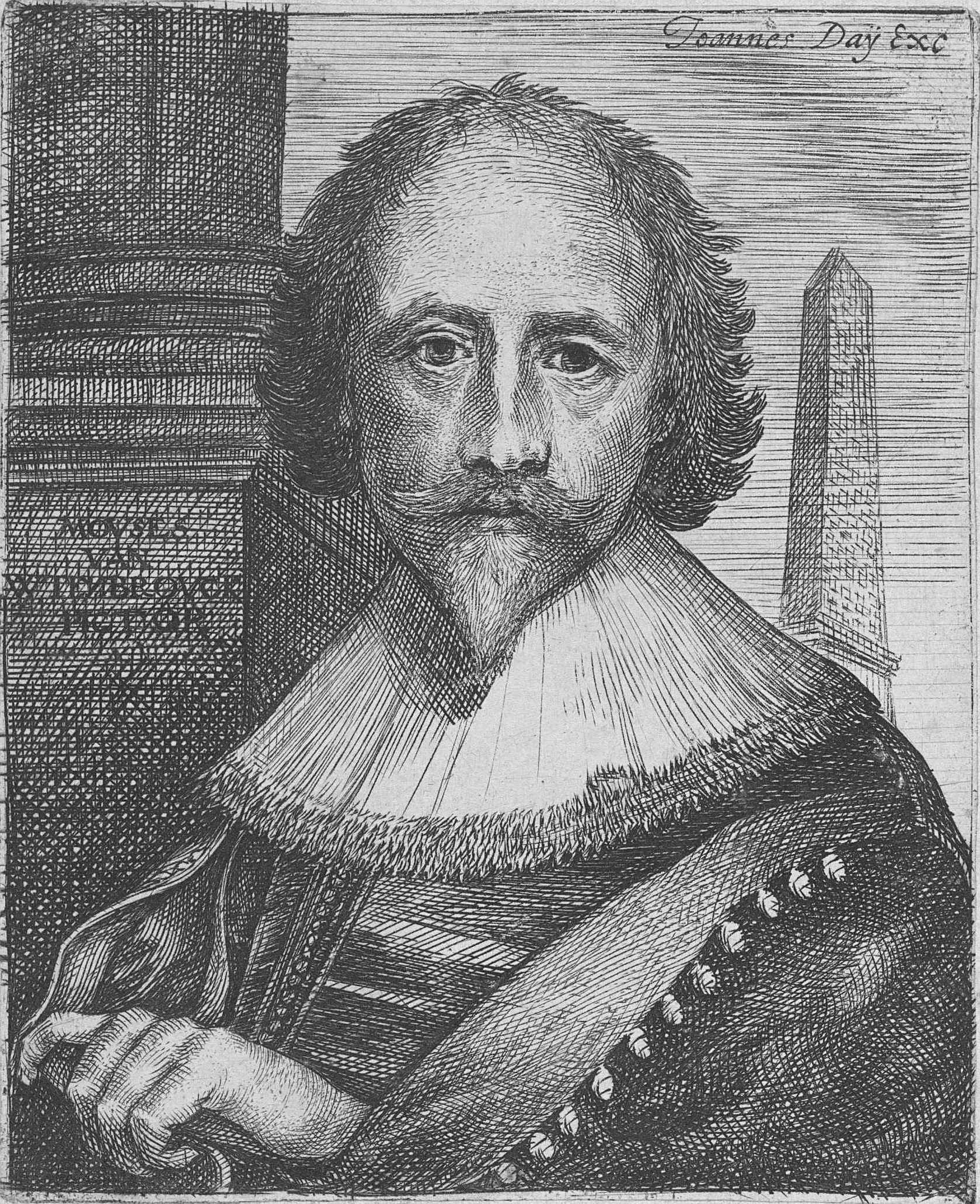
- Self-portrait of Moses van Uyttenbroeck
- Born: 1600, c. 1595; The Hague, Netherlands
- Died: 1646; The Hague, Netherlands

Moses van Uyttenbroeck, or Moyses van Wtenbrouck (c. 1600–1646) was a Dutch Golden Age painter and etcher.

== Biography ==
Van Uyttenbroeck was born and died in The Hague. According to the RKD he was the younger brother of the painter Jan Matheus van Wtenbrouck, and later became the teacher of the painters Anthonie Jansz. van der Croos and perhaps Dirk Dalens the Elder, since their styles were so similar. Van Uyttenbroeck primarily painted works based on religious and classical mythology themes. He was a versatile court painter who painted portraits and Italianate landscapes in the manner of Cornelis van Poelenburch. He joined the Guild of Saint Luke in 1614. Van Uyttenbroeck died in 1646.

== Gallery ==
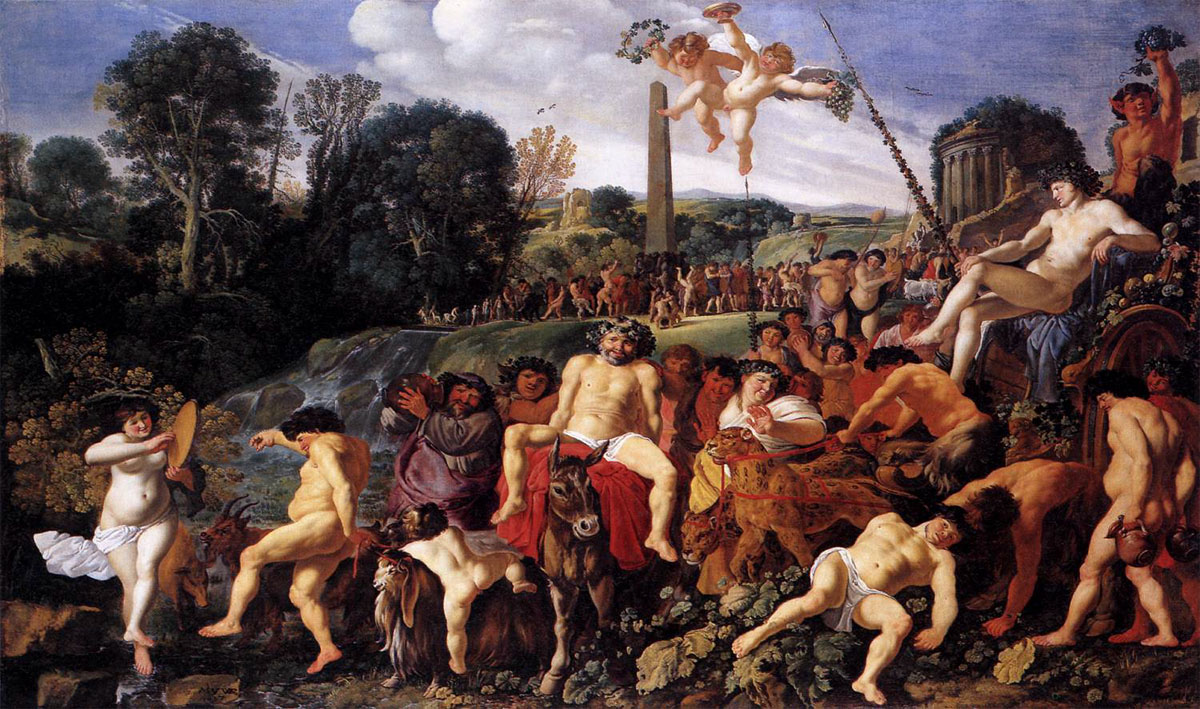
Bacchanal, Herzog Anton Ulrich Museum, 1627

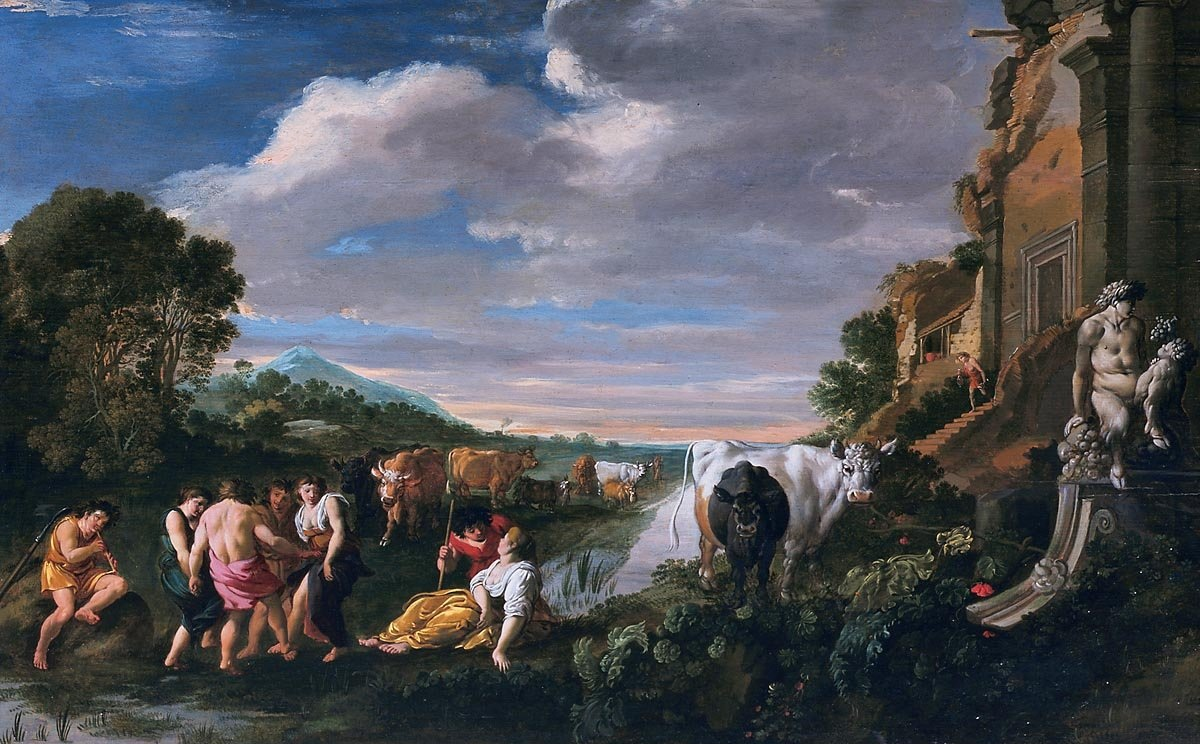
Landscape with Shepherds, Royal Picture Gallery Mauritshuis, The Hague 1626

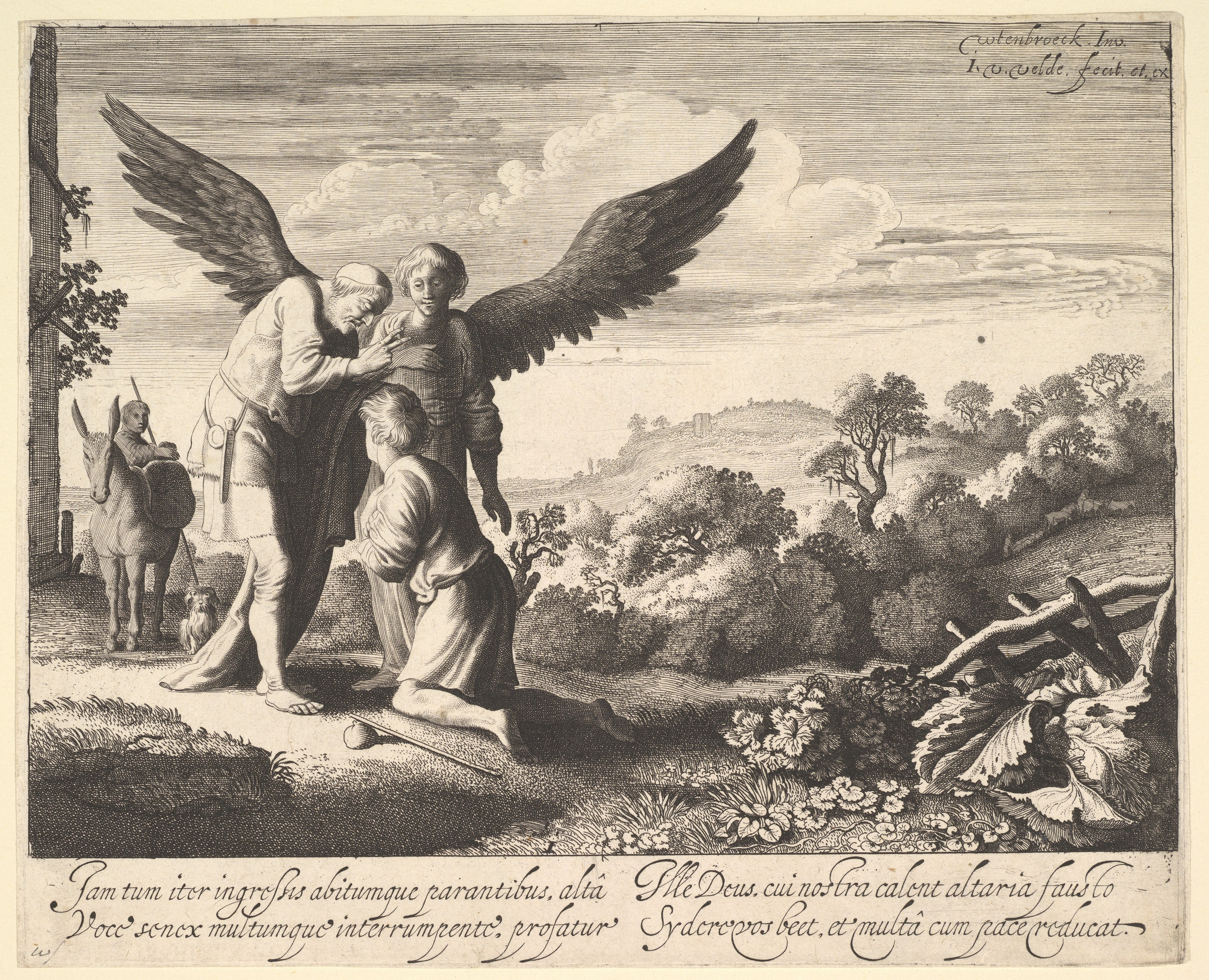
Tobias Blessed by Blind Tobit, from The Story of Tobias

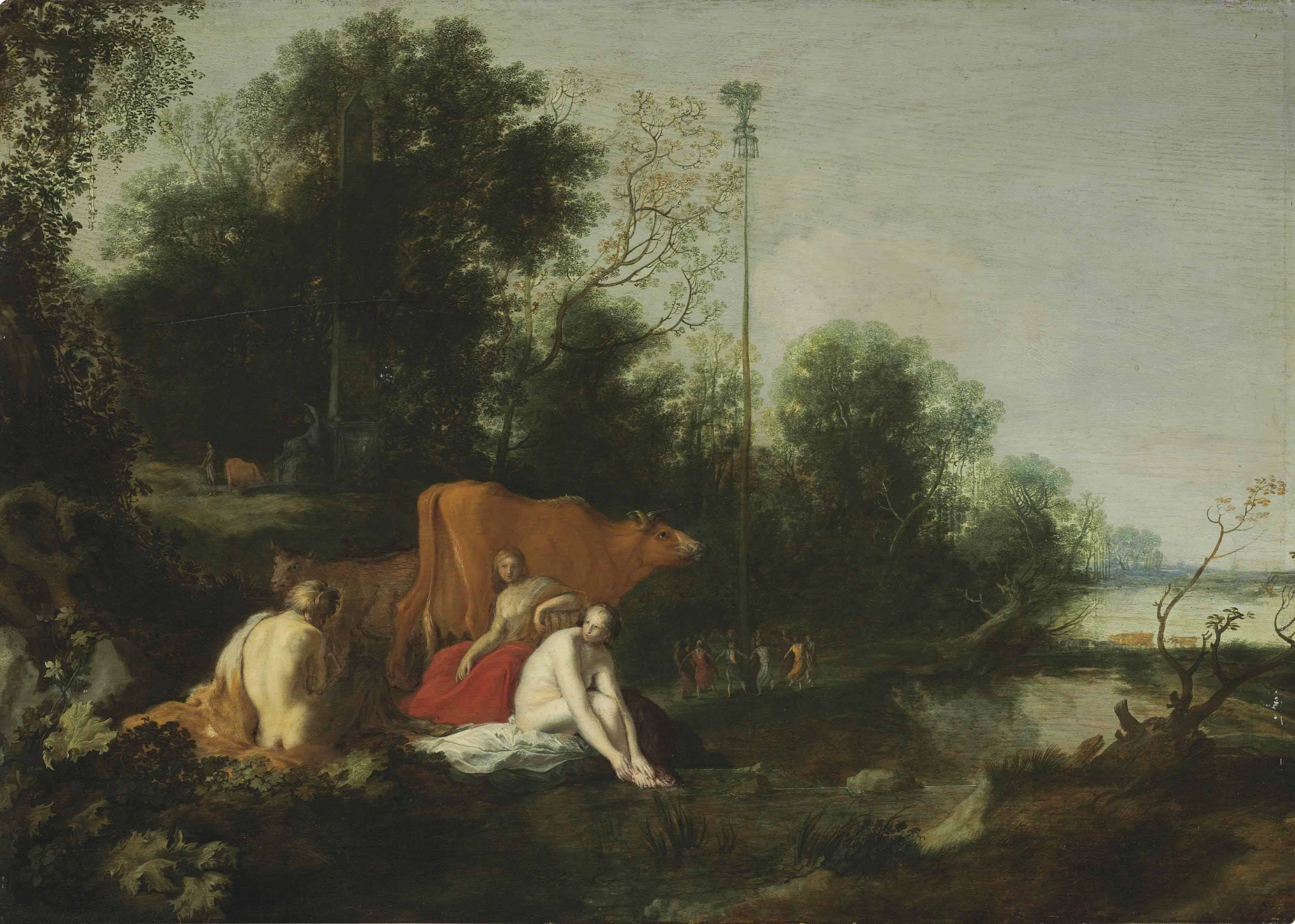
Landscape with Satyr, Nymphs and Cattle, Private Collection
