= Dalen Lance =

South African television host

- Born: Dalen Lance Jooste; 16 February 1983 (age 43); Cape Town, South Africa
- Presenting career
- Show: Step up or Step Out
- Station: e.tv
- Show: Dagbreek Breakfast Show
- Station: DSTV Kyknet
- Country: South Africa
- Previous show: High School Musical Spotlight SA
- Website: http://www.Colourof9.com

Dalen Lance Jooste (Pronounced "Day-lyn") (born 16 February 1983) is a South African television host based in Johannesburg, South Africa. He was the host of the reality TV dance competition Step Up or Step Out for two seasons and a host of the early-morning TV show Dagbreek on DSTV's Kyknet channel. Lance has also performed as a presenter on television shows such as High School Musical, Spotlight South Africa, 20-Something, Pap Idols, and Bling. He released his debut album in 2006, titled Be Your Man, along with a single of the same name. He completed a Bachelor of Commerce degree in Financial Accounting at the University of Cape Town in 2004 and a Master of Business Leadership degree in 2014 through the University of South Africa (Unisa) Graduate School of Business Leadership.

For his contributions as a television host, Lance was ranked amongst the "Top 10 in Television" 2008–09 by the Saturday Independent Newspaper, and has received numerous nominations for best presenter at the SA Kellog's Kids Choice Awards and Star in You Awards. In addition to his television endeavours, since 2009 Lance has been serving as a resident master of ceremonies at the Montecasino gaming complex in Johannesburg.

== Early life and education ==
Dalen Lance was born 16 February 1983 in Cape Town, South Africa to parents Gavin and Myna Jooste. He has three siblings, Tashline, Keziah, and Roxanne. Shortly after his birth, his family relocated from Malmesbury to Atlantis, in close proximity to Cape Town. Lance's eldest sibling, Tashline, is a sports marketing and sponsorship executive based in Johannesburg. Keziah Jooste, the 1998 second runner-up contestant to Miss South Africa, is a South African actress who has appeared in TV series such as Isidingo, 7de Laan, and the popular soap, Generations. Roxanne Jooste currently resides in Los Angeles and works as a dancer and model signed to Wilhelmina Models.

Lance attended Wesfluer Primary (Atlantis) and completed high school at Table View High School in 2000. He completed his BComm degree at the University of Cape Town in 2004 and a master of business leadership (MBL) degree (cum laude) at the Unisa's Graduate School of Business Leadership in 2014. He received scholarships from the Judge Ngoepe Scholarship Fund and was placed in the top five of the programme in both of his first two years. His dissertation related to the future of television broadcasting, specifically the global unilateral regulatory considerations for Internet Protocol Television IPTV.

== Career ==
In 2002, while still an undergraduate, Lance entered the first season of Idols South Africa and reached the top 50 round of the competition. He also entered South African Popstars in the same year. He recorded his first demo at Mama Dance Music Studios (Observatory, Cape Town) and numerous radio jingles for Good Hope FM, one of Cape Town's biggest radio stations.

Soon after he completed his undergrad studies, his sister Keziah advised him to meet with Cape Town talent agent Janet du Plessis of Artistes Personal Management ("APM") in 2002. Under du Plessis's guidance, Lance filmed projects for the BBC, Walt Disney World and the SABC. In 2005, he took time off to travel and served as a camp counselor and audio-visual teacher at Camp Mariah in New York City.

Upon returning to South Africa in 2006, he relocated to Johannesburg to pursue music and television full-time.

=== Television host ===
==== Bling ====
In 2003 Bling, a youth television programme, became Lance's first presenting role and was commissioned for two seasons before being cancelled by broadcaster SABC 2. The show was produced by Okuhle Media, formally known as Page to Pictures. Lance's co-presenter during the two seasons was Jodi Balfour, actress and Miss South Africa contestant. Both Balfour and Lance were nominated in the category of SA's Best Youth Presenters at the Star in You awards. Additionally, the series was nominated in the category Best Youth Show at the SAFTA awards in 2007.

==== Pap Idols ====
In 2006, Lance hosted Pap Idols, a traveling cooking show produced by Robert Patel (RP Productions) for broadcaster SABC 2 and commissioned by the Maize Trust of South Africa. He was hosted by a number of South African celebrities in their homes, where they had to cook a meal, with maize being the main ingredient. The purpose of the programme was to showcase the versatility and health benefits of maize.

==== 20-Something ====
In 2008, Lance hosted magazine show 20-Something for channel E.tv. Subsequent to completing a few episodes for the show, he was chosen as host for M-net's High School Musical Spotlight South Africa. During his time on 20 Something, Lance served as both an in-studio and field presenter, and interviewed various South African newsmakers.

==== High School Musical Spotlight South Africa ====
In 2008, Lance hosted the reality television series High School Musical Spotlight South Africa. It was produced by Eden Rage Media for M-net. The show portrayed a search for the leads for a High School Musical stage production to be produced by Pieter Toerien, who also served as the main judge on the series. It was the first reality TV spin-off from the High School Musical franchise, with approval and co-development from Disney executives in the US.

==== Step Up or Step Out ====
Lance was hired as series host for seasons 1 and 2 of Step Up or Step Out, broadcast on E.tv in 2011 and 2012. The programme is produced by Endemol South Africa. and is syndicated on the E.tv DStv platform to 45 countries across the African continent. The reality competition searches for SA's hottest dance crews. In its first season, the show garnered record viewership figures for its Sunday-night premieres, roughly two million viewers. Lance left the show in 2013, prior to season 3, in order to focus on his final year of graduate studies.

==== Dagbreek ====
In November 2012, Lance was signed as one of the television presenters for Kyknet's Dagbreek, a daily morning TV show targeting the South African Afrikaans market. The show premiered on 5 November 2012. In addition to television veterans Riaan Cruywagen and Bettie Kemp, Lance's co-hosts included Rozanne McKenzie, Elma Smit, Pierre Breytenbacht, and Harold Richter. Dagbreek is a morning news show broadcast daily between 5:30 and 7:30 on DStv. He left Dagbreek in April 2013 to complete his final year of MBL studies.

=== Recording artist ===
In 2006, Lance released his debut album, entitled Be Your Man. Singles from the urban-pop album received high rotation across radio stations, notably, Good Hope FM, Metro FM, Heart 104.9 FM, 5fm, East Coast Radio (ECR) and K FM Radio. For the promotion of the album, Lance toured South Africa extensively in late 2005. The music video for the first single, "Be Your Man", was shot in Johannesburg and made it onto the Channel O and Yo-TV music charts. The album was produced by Verd and Leveil Eaton of Brotherhood Productions and was released under the music label Notae Entertainment, headed by Carl and Vaughn Eaton. The album was a joint venture between Notae and Lance's sister, Tashline Jooste. Lance also contributed to the songwriting of the album, specifically "Be Your Man" and "Old School Days".

Album Track Listing: Be Your Man – Dalen (2006)
1. Be your man
2. I like
3. Old school days
4. Do you still love me
5. Everybody

=== Actor and model ===
==== Real People campaign for Woolworths ====
In 2005, retail giant Woolworths hired Lance as a face of its "Real People" campaign, showcasing talented South African celebrities using in-store and outdoor billboards.

==== Summer collection ad campaign for Jet Stores Edcon Group ====
The Jet summer in-store billboard campaign was shot in July 2009 and featured Lance on billboards across all of the Jet stores.

==== Advertising campaign for Absa Group ====
In 2010, Lance was hired as the campaign face and voice for Absa Group. The bank launched its advertising campaign (Kweeka) in an effort to encourage their clients to use digital banking platforms. Lance appeared on billboards, online media, television commercials, and radio spots to promote the campaign, created by advertising agency Mortimer Harvey.

==== Vodacom Yebo-Yethu campaign ====
In 2014, Lance was chosen by Vodacom to appear as a model and voiceover artist for its Yebo-Yethu OTC Platform Launch campaign. This was a six-month endeavour to activate the launch of the share-trading platform.

==== TV commercial credits ====
Mango (airline) ('09), Disprin ('09), Edgars ('10), Jet Clothing ('09), Vodacom ('10), VW Polo Playa ('10).

==== Other acting credits ====
- Walt Disney World's Zenon: Z3
- BBC's Cave Girl Series
- SABC 2's SOS television series
- SABC 3's This Life series
- SABC 2's Bling

== Charity work ==
Lance has been a charity ambassador for the Starfish Greathearts Foundation since 2010 and a champion of the South African National Blood Service (SANBS).
