= Theodor van Pee =

Dutch painter

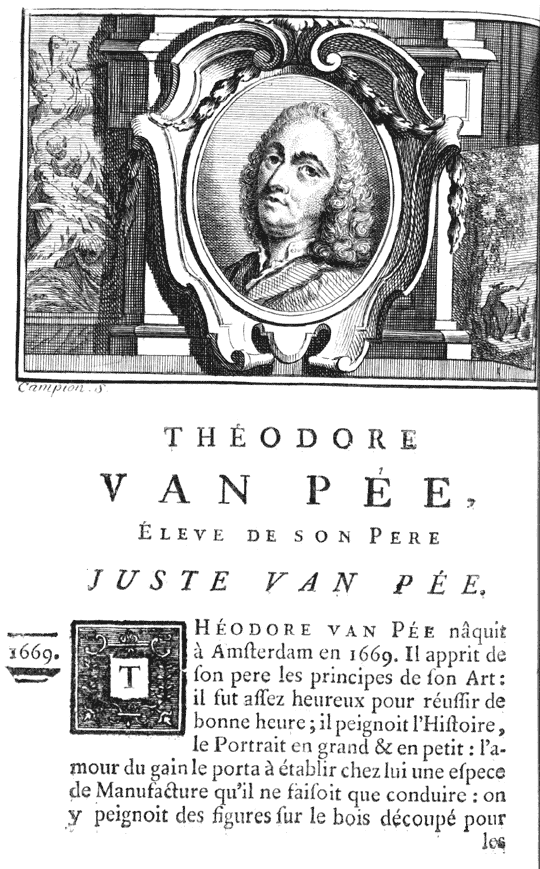
Theodor van Pee's portrait in Jean-Baptiste Descamps book of painters, 1764

Theodorus van Pee (1668–1746) was an 18th-century painter and art dealer from the Dutch Republic.

== Biography ==
Born in Amsterdam in 1668 or 1669, he was a son of the painter Jan van Pee and his wife Hendrika. His father moved to Antwerp when Theodor was still a child, and the boy was brought up in the household of his maternal grandparents in Amsterdam. At the age of eighteen he was apprenticed to a jeweller in order to qualify for admission to the Goldsmiths' Guild in the city but, when twenty, he sought his father’s permission to abandon his articles and train as a painter. His father initially withheld consent, counselling that the life of an artist was precarious and that "the golden wings of Mercury offer better shelter than the flimsy wings of Saint Luke" (Luke being the patron saint of painters). However, in the face of his son’s sustained entreaties, the elder van Pee eventually relented.

Theodor is generally said to have become his father’s pupil but his maternal grandfather, Mathijs Hendriks Krayvelt, was also a painter and is likely to have had a hand in his training. Krayvelt was nervous when Theodor wished to spend time in Rome studying the works of artists such as Raphael, Giulio Romano and Correggio, fearing the young man might return reciting Catholic verses rather than the prayers of Johann Habermann. However, despite his various foreign travels, Theodor remained a Lutheran all his life.

He was still living with his Krayvelt grandparents in Amsterdam’s Haarlemmerdijk when, on 9 May 1682, banns of his marriage to the eighteen-year-old Neeltje Peters van Bassevelde were published.

== Important early commissions ==
Following his marriage he applied himself diligently to painting. He showed some of his early life studies to Melchior d'Hondecoeter who, impressed by their quality, began to recommend him to potential clients but died shortly afterwards. Jonkheer Lodewyk de Bas commissioned him to produce a study of Northern Italian gypsies in the manner of Murillo, and the resultant piece was so favourably received that Theodor produced several similar studies which sold well. His portrayal of the Masters of the Amsterdam Tailors’ Guild also satisfied his client and resulted in a further commission from the Guild six or seven years later. His studio flourished and he began to take pupils, Adam Silo being among the first.

== Activity during recession ==
The economic recession in the Netherlands following the 1697 Peace of Ryswick led to a decline in demand for the portraits, historical studies, mural and ceiling paintings which had been the source of Theodor’s income. To compensate, he opened a shop selling painted garden furniture and statuary, animal-themed ornaments and even Turkish tents, and he also sold lengths of timber carved and painted with maidens, knights, barking dogs and other figures for display on house exteriors. Business in these decorative items was initially rewarding but quickly became unprofitable due to fierce competition from others who entered the market. Theodor’s pupil Dirk Dalens III is said to have left his studio around this time on account of displeasure with Theodor’s style, but possibly he disliked involvement with the forms of artwork into which his master had diversified.

Over the years Theodor had bought and sold the works of other artists, and as the eighteenth century progressed he began to deal particularly in Italian paintings. Jacob Campo Weyerman spoke of him as a judicious expert who collected a fine gallery of works, whereas Jan van Gool referred to his buying up Italian pieces "which if without a signature he would add one". In 1715 he took his collection to London with a view to selling it there.

== Residence in London ==
Earlier migrants from Amsterdam to London, Sir Matthew Decker and Sir Justus Beck, introduced him to a circle of English noblemen and prominent merchants and he quickly found buyers for items from his collection. Beck commissioned him to paint a ceiling-piece of life-size figures, and Theodor’s preparatory version of this work was admired by Weyerman who declared its images, colours, arrangement and lighting were conceived and executed with all the skill and judgment of a masterpiece. Theodor returned to Amsterdam to complete this project and brought the finished work to England in 1719, accompanied by his wife, her maid, and a fresh stock of paintings purchased while in Holland. Although he was himself able to blend comfortably into any social setting, his wife and her maid found difficulty in adjusting to London life and soon returned to Amsterdam.

Beck became a casualty of the collapse in the value of South Sea Company stock and was bankrupted in 1720 when he had paid only two-thirds of the sum agreed for van Pee’s ceiling-piece. According to van Gool, Theodor’s desire to avenge the shortfall led him to feign illness so severe that his death seemed imminent. By such means he induced customers to pay for paintings by way of an annuity for his lifetime; as a result buyers expecting to make no more than one or perhaps two of the obligatory annual amounts found themselves continuing to make payments for the next quarter of a century under agreements that had been scrupulously notarised.

While "recovering" from his professed sickness, he acquired a house on Hyde Park Corner and there resumed the business of selling ornamental objects which he had earlier carried on in Amsterdam. He displayed his stock prominently in front of the house to catch the eye of wealthy patrons travelling into London from homes in the country.

Information about his business and personal activities in London is scant outside the biographical account published by Jan van Gool soon after Theodor’s death, although he has been said to have "amassed a considerable fortune" during his time in the city. Van Gool’s account is long and perhaps largely scurrilous and was deplored by the younger Gerard Hoet who complained it omitted reference to Theodor’s artistic achievements, portrayed him as a complete cutpurse, and served no purpose other than to distress his widow, to whom van Gool’s allegations were novel.

After seven years in London, and having decided to return to his native land, Theodor held a public auction of all his own works and other paintings except those which he thought would fetch better prices in the Netherlands.

== Return to the Netherlands and final years ==
In the Netherlands he initially based himself at Maarssen and was a member of the Utrecht Guild of Saint Luke in 1737. He was sufficiently well regarded in the 1730s to be commissioned to paint the portrait of Jean-Baptiste de Boyer, Marquis d'Argens, of which engravings were made by each of Jacob van der Schley, Jean-Louis Daudet, and Etienne-Jehandier Desrochers. Theodor’s portrait of the Abbé Prévost was also the subject of an engraving by van der Schley.

He later moved to The Hague, where he died in 1746. He had outlived his first wife and, at the age of 76, married a young widow. His only child to survive to maturity, Henrietta, studied painting under him and in 1719 married another of his pupils, Hermanus Wolters, but in later life father and daughter seem to have been estranged.

Pictures forming part of his estate were sold at auction in The Hague on 23 May 1747 and included twenty-four painted by him and two by his father. Sold in the same auction were pictures owned by the late Ontsanger Pook, and the catalogue does not indicate which of the 112 lots on offer, many of them by leading Dutch Golden Age Painters, belonged to which the two estates being liquidated.

== External source ==
- Theodorus van Pee on Artnet
- Jan van Gool’s De niewe Schouburg der Nederlantsche Kunstschilders en schilderessen
