= Eden Mills Writers' Festival =

Annual writing festival in Eden Mills, Ontario, Canada

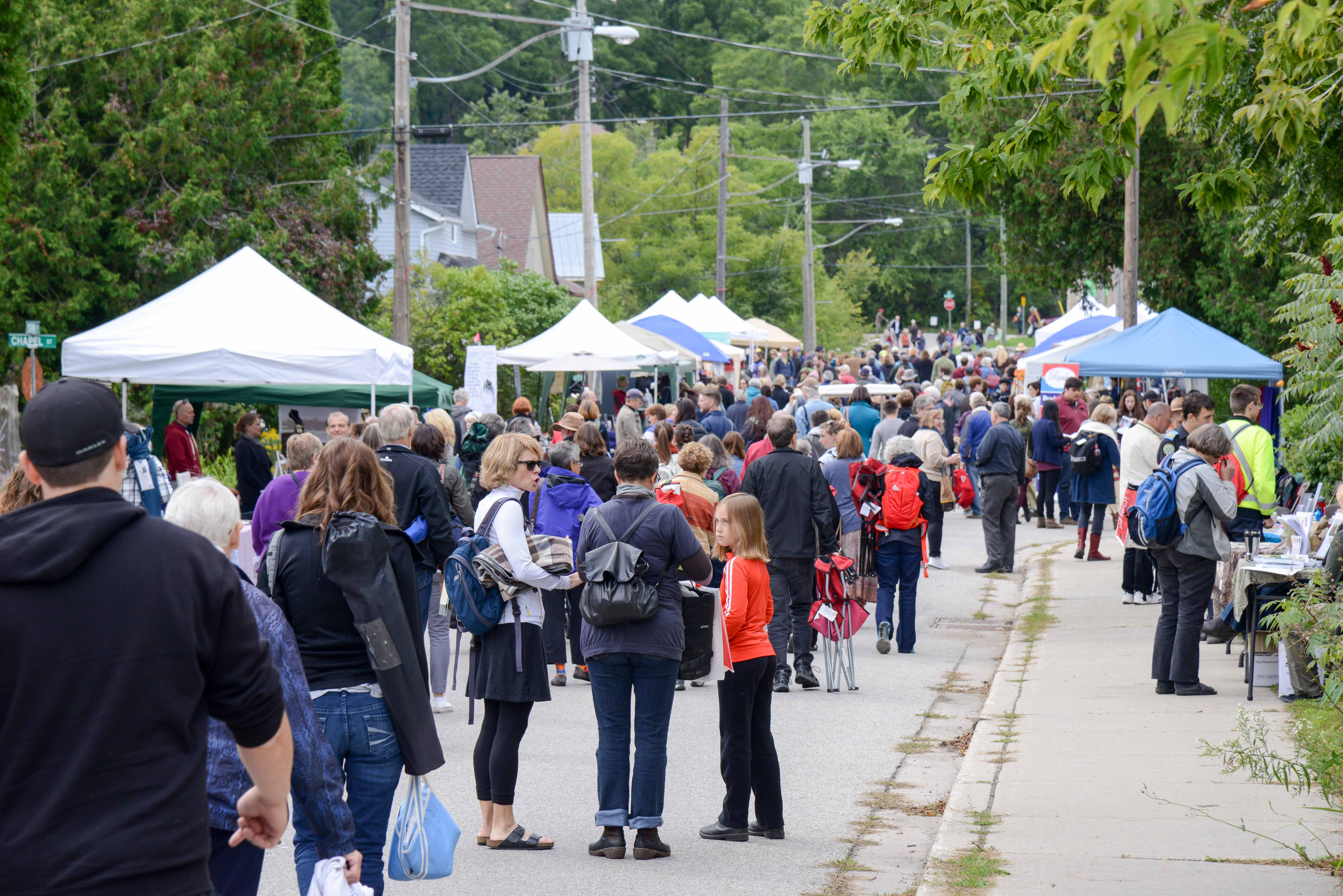
Publisher's Way at the Festival

The Eden Mills Writers' Festival is held annually in the village of Eden Mills, Ontario, which is approximately 12 kilometres (7.5 mi) east of Guelph, Ontario, Canada. The festival includes readings by poets, authors, and other writers at various outdoor venues throughout the village. The festival occurs on the first Sunday after Labour Day in September. In previous years more than 40 Canadian authors appeared to give readings and interact with audiences, including notable Canadian writers such as Margaret Atwood and P. K. Page. On September 15, 2013, the Festival celebrated its 25th anniversary.

The festival also provides opportunities for young and unpublished writers to present their work in a juried reading session called "the Fringe." There are two literary contests: the Ishar Singh Poetry Contest and the Festival Literary Contest for new writers over the age of 16. The festival includes a book vendors' bazaar (Publisher's Way), a First Nations event, a children's site, and musical events. Eden Mills is located on the Eramosa River and the festival's principal readings take place on its banks.

== History ==
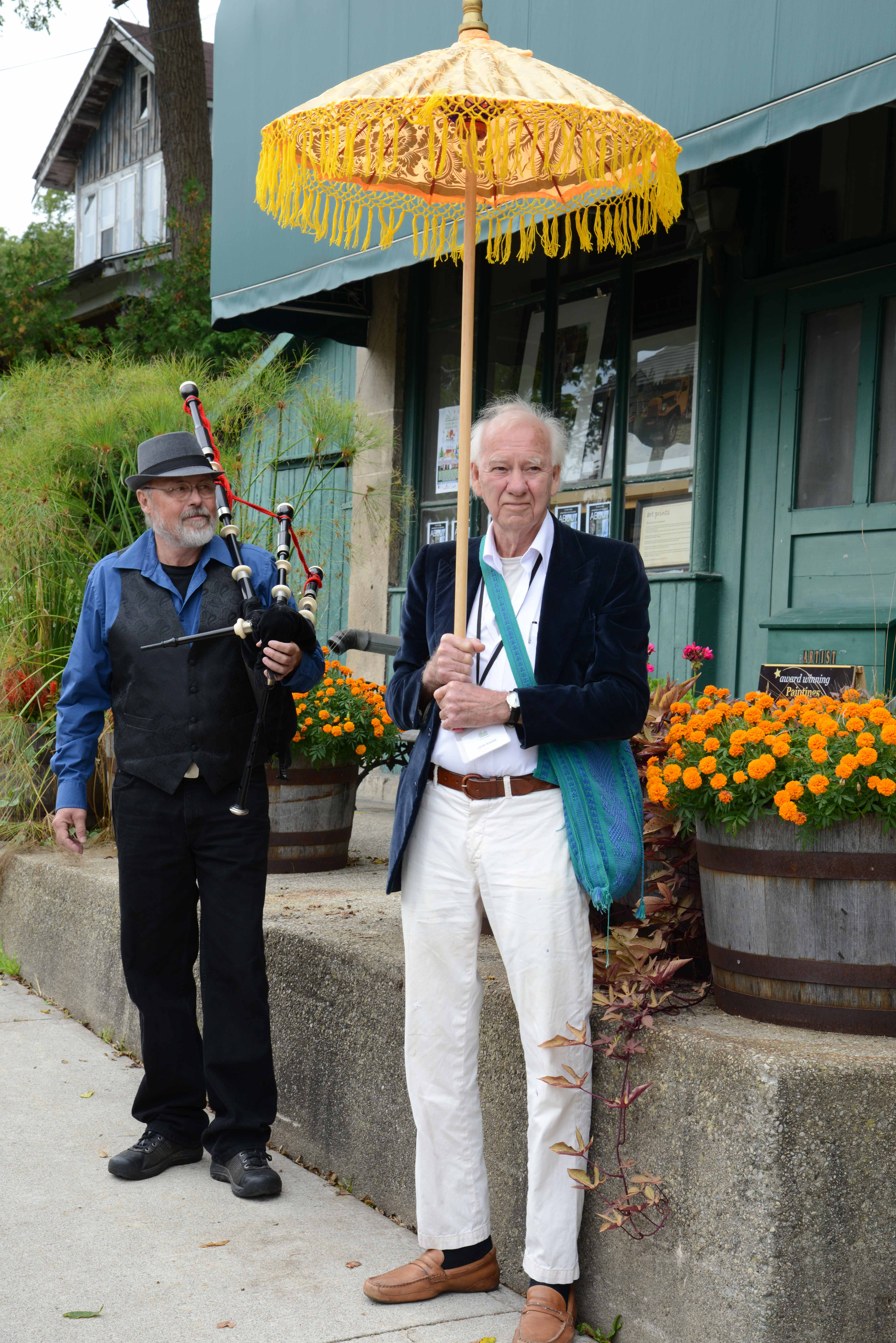
Rooke in front of the General Store in Eden Mills where the festival started

In 1989 the Eden Mills Writers' Festival began, featuring Leon Rooke, local resident, writer and a Governor General's Award winner. It has been held annually since then, and expanded its programs: the number of professional readers, contests, etc.

The festival began in the original General Store, which was built in 1877. Don and Mark Holman, the owners of the general store at the time, suggested to neighbor Leon Rooke (who was then living with his wife Constance across the street) to launch his latest novel A Good Baby, from just outside the store. Rooke invited other writers to this event, such as Rohinton Mistry, Michael Ondaatje, Jane Urquhart and Linda Spalding. A small audience of 350 people showed up and the Eden Mills Writers' Festival had begun.

== The Festival ==
Over the years, the Festival has taken place in an array of different Eden Mills venues, most of which are outdoors. Some are on the banks of the Eramosa River; others are in local residents' scenic backyards, to name a few. In addition to the main venues, there is a popular First Nations area (the Adisokaun stage). Children's Site is held at Jenny's Place, a retail store. Additions to the festival include the fringe and Young Adult readings, as well as two annual literary competitions.

The festival also has a section of the village partitioned for Publishers' Way. This is where booksellers, publishers, magazine producers and non-profit groups can display their work. Authors also congregate here to meet fans and sign their books. There is live music between readings and local food vendors sell various types of food to accommodate all tastes. This all happens within the small village, where participants can walk easily from venue to venue. The festival does offer transportation for anyone who cannot manage the walking.

The 2020 festival, scheduled for September 11–13, was cancelled due to the coronavirus pandemic and was replaced with "a series of free online literary events" from May to October.

== Gallery ==
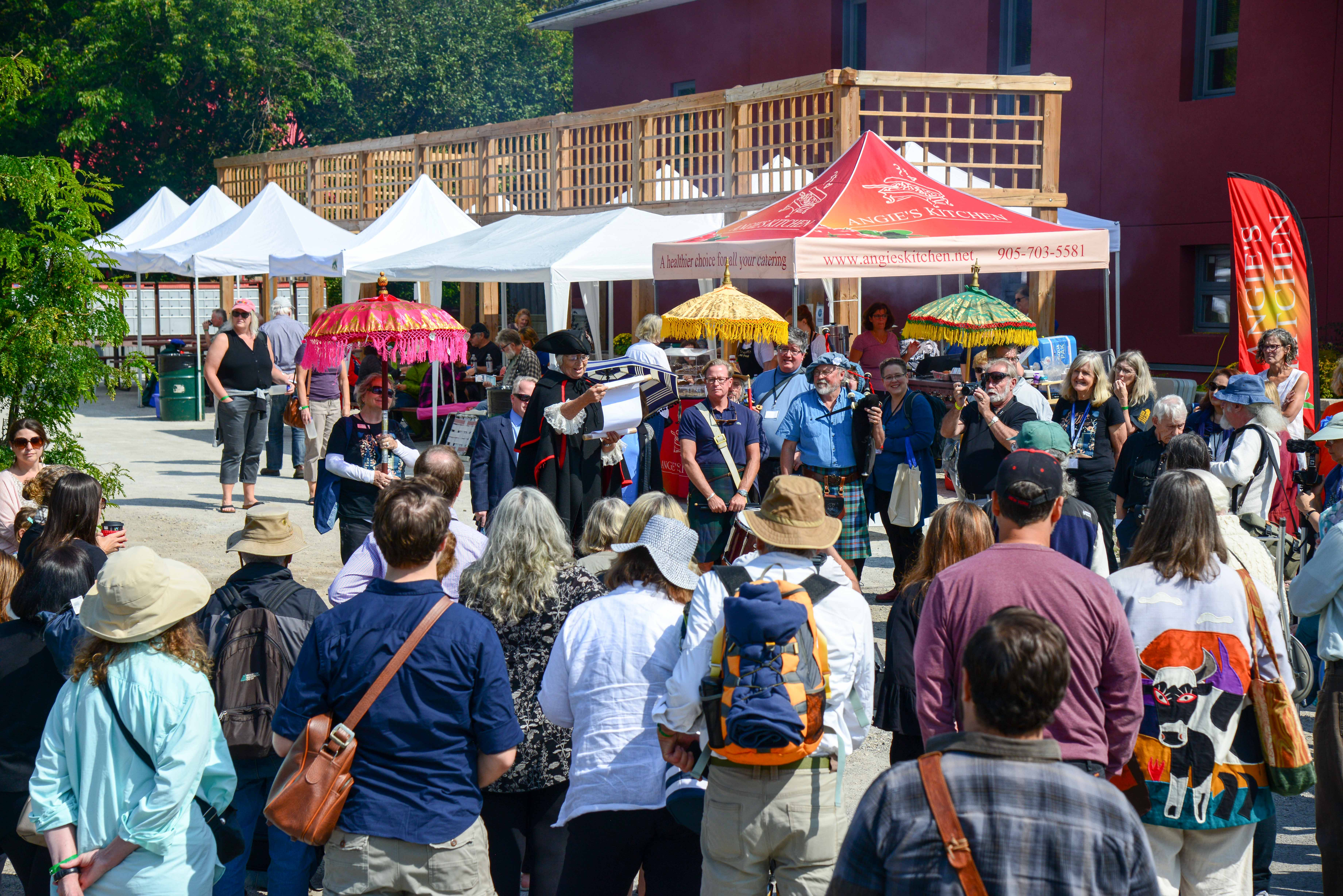
Opening of Eden Mills Writers Festival and dedication by the Town Crier

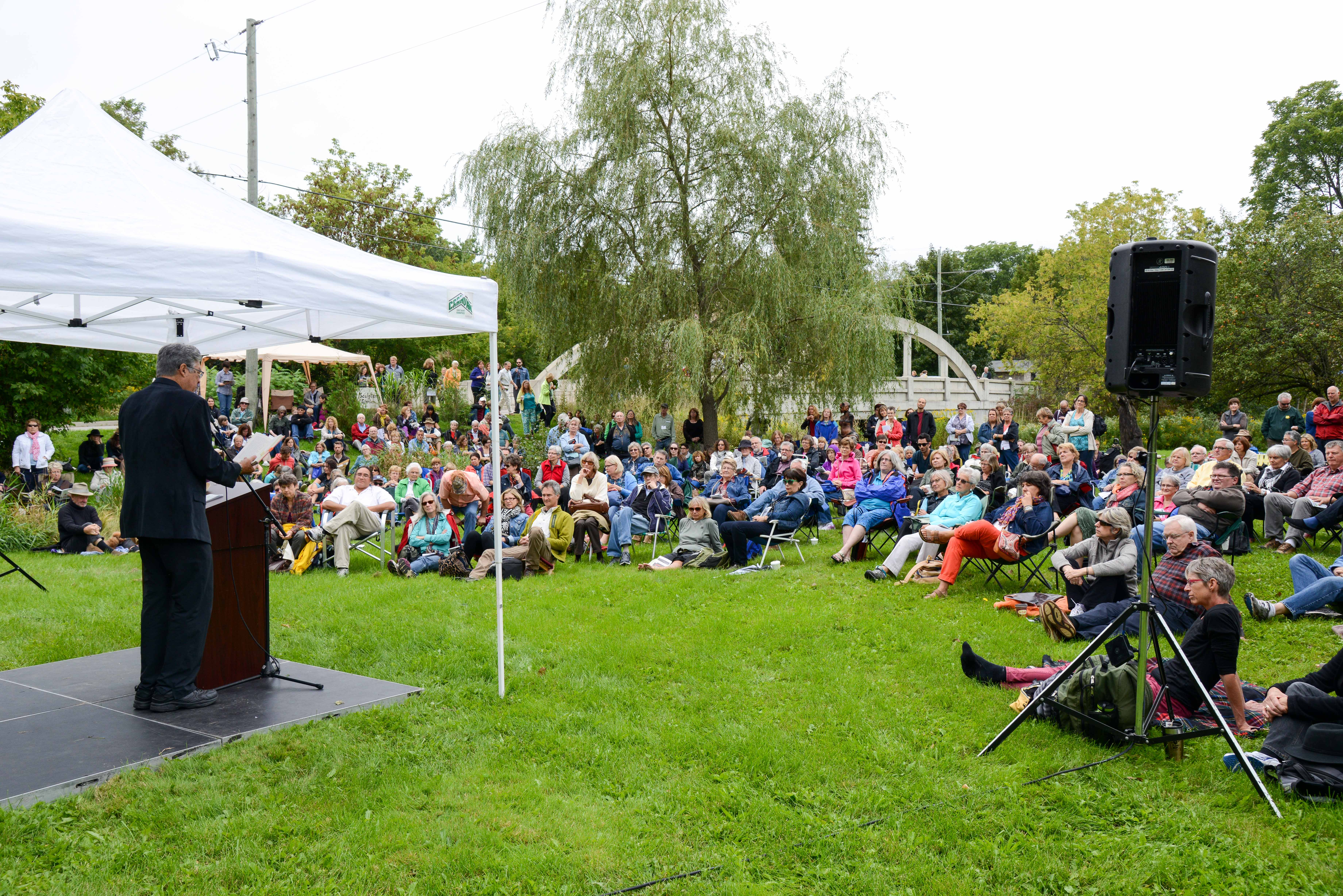
Thomas King reading in the Sculpture Garden

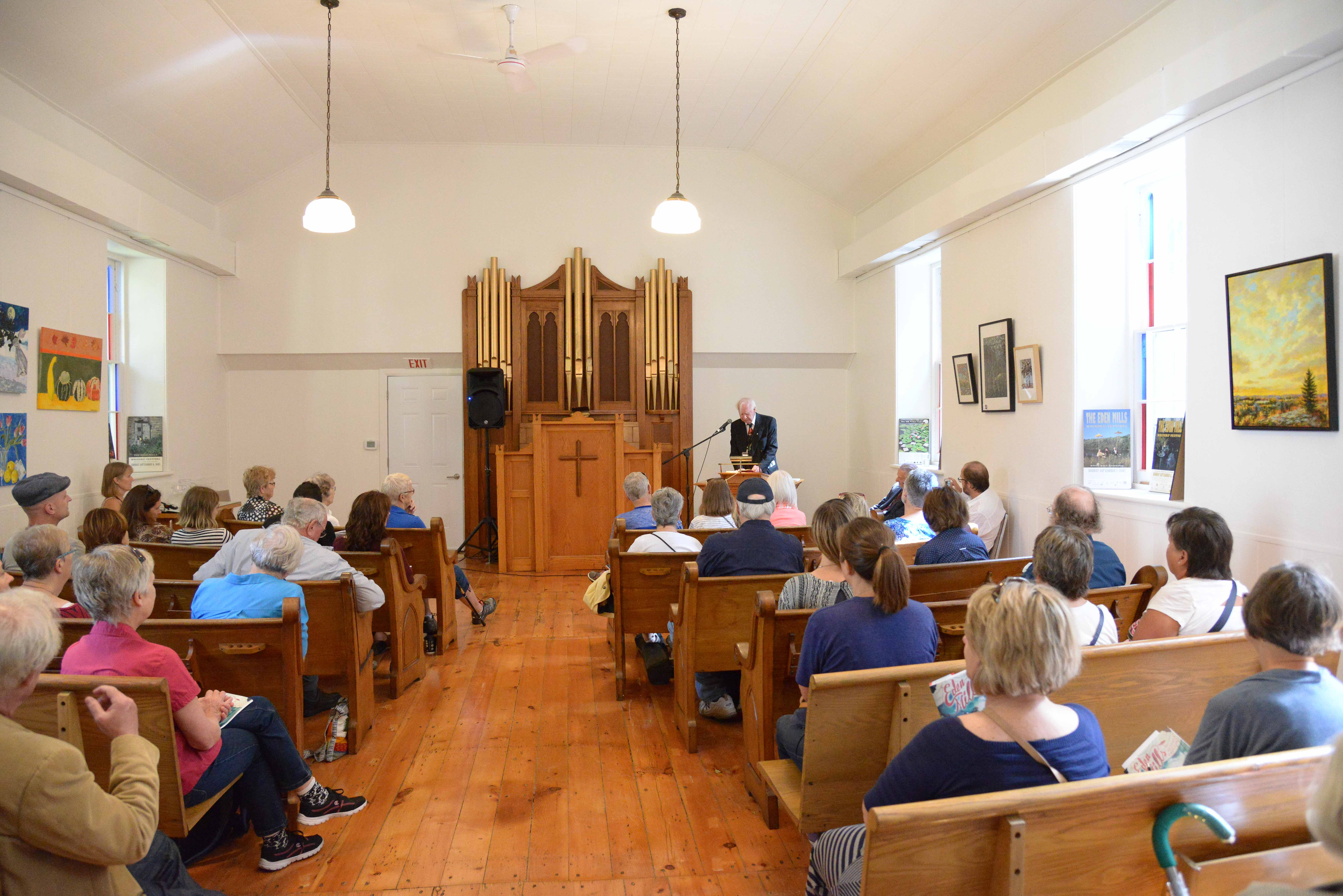
Leon Rooke reading in Rivermead

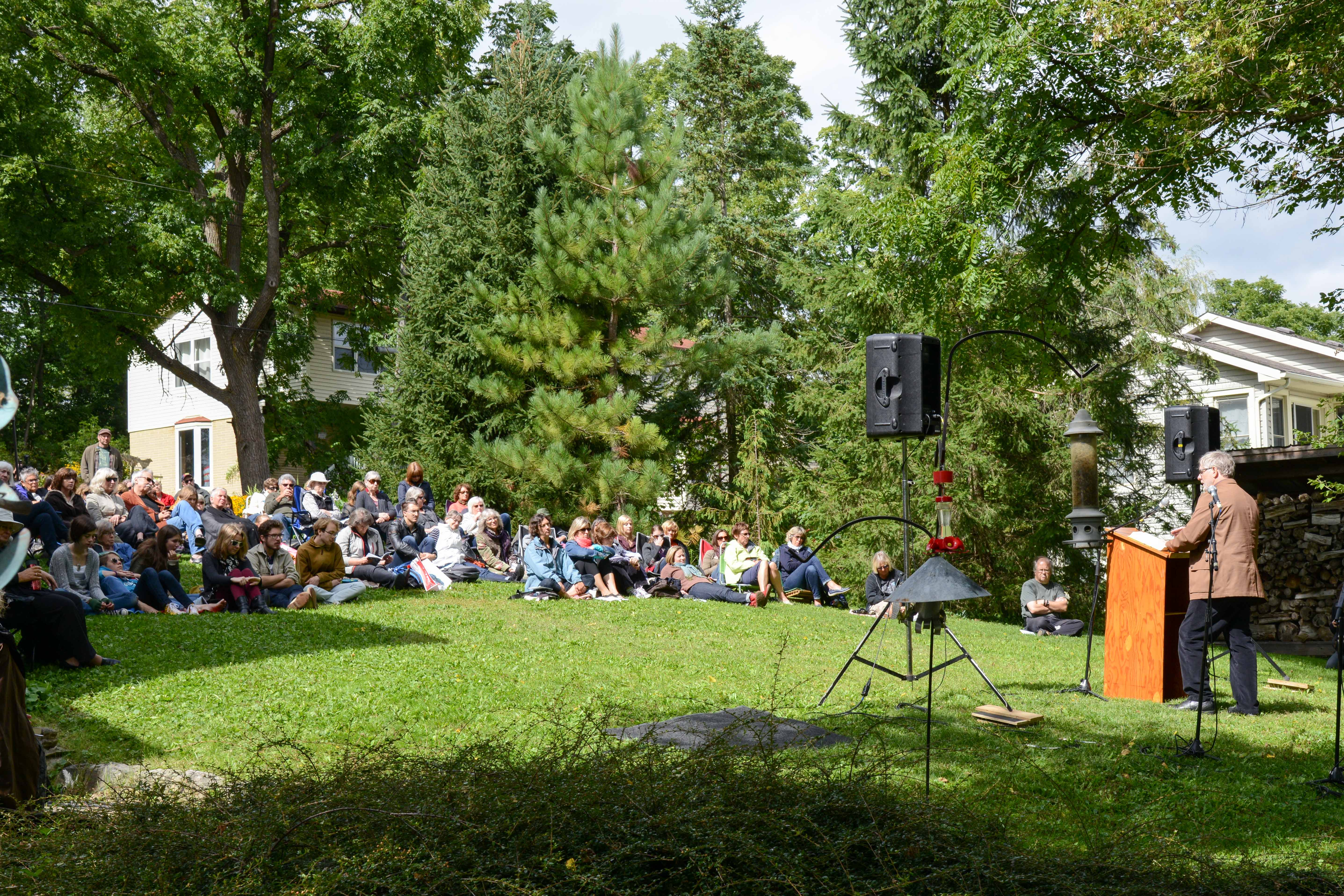
David Adams Richards reading at The Mill

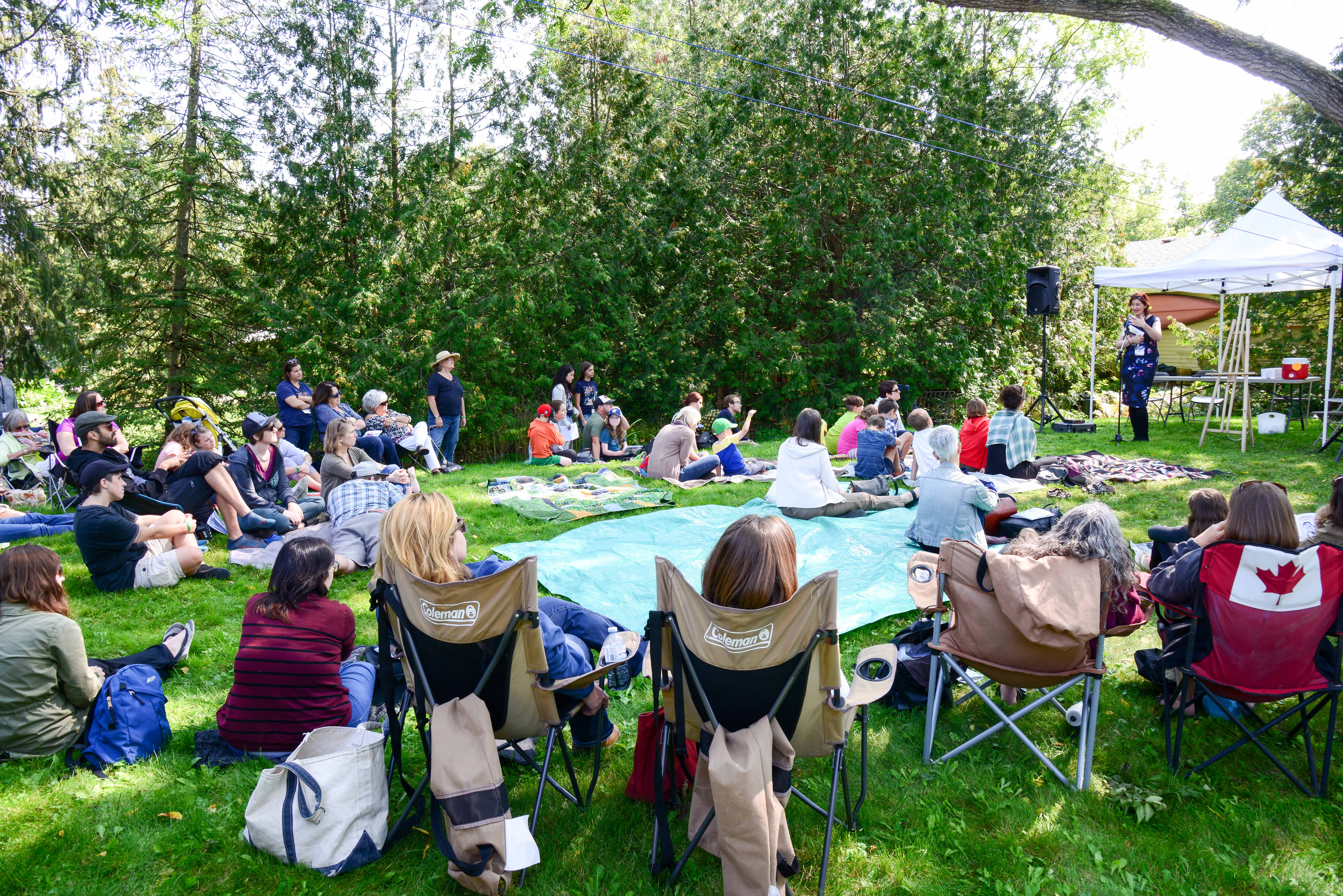
Emma Donoghue reading in Jenny's Place

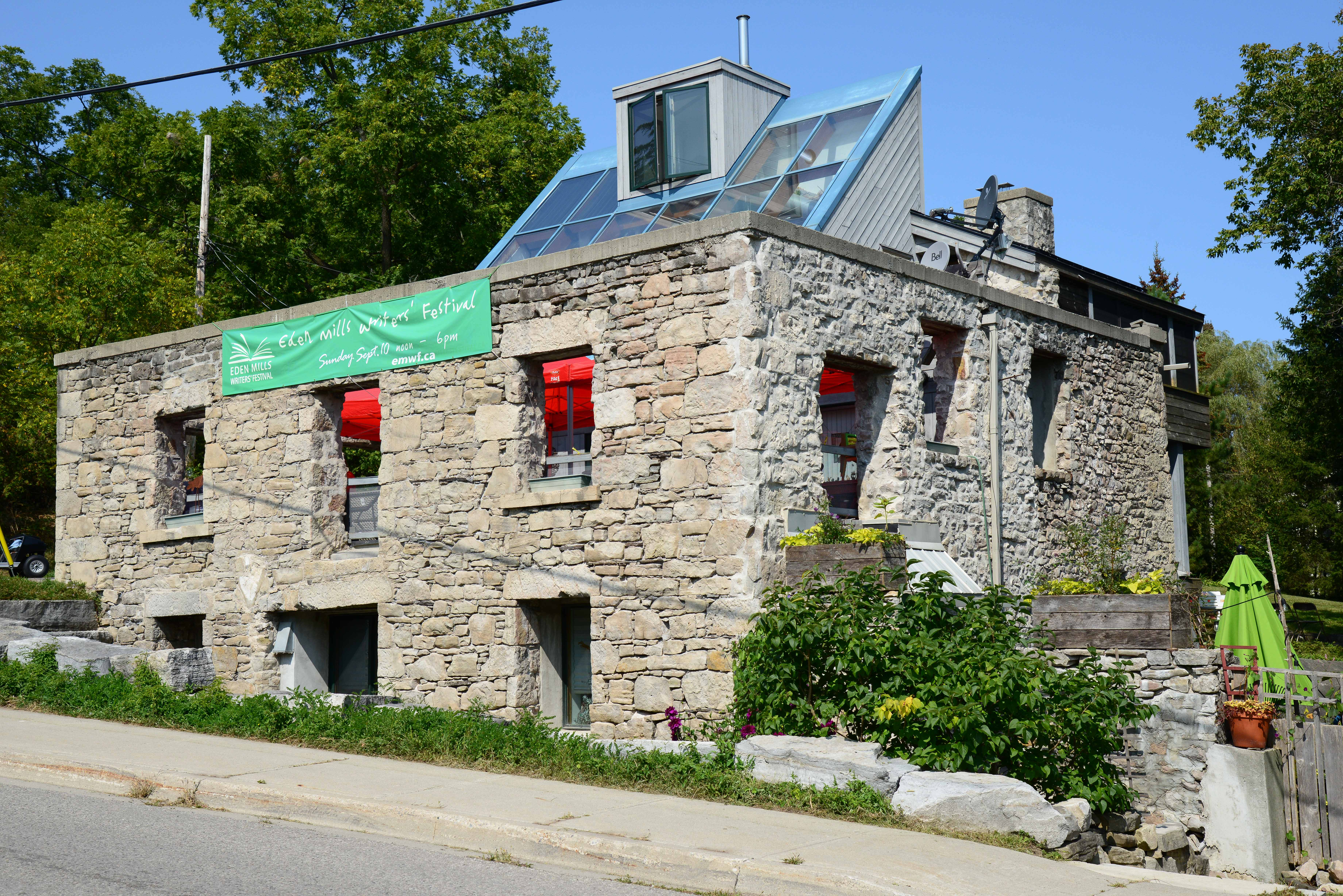
The Mill, one of the many venues for the festival

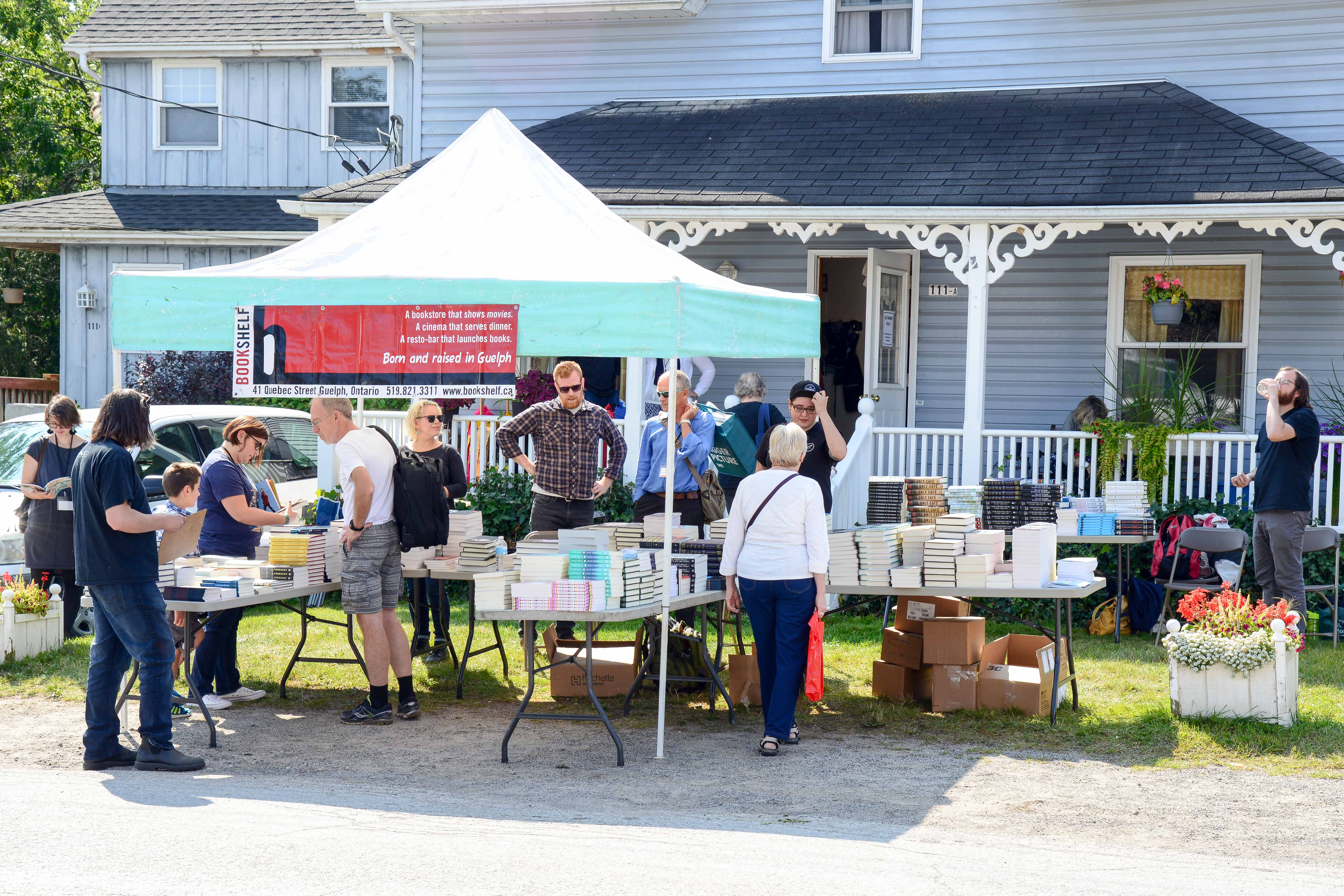
The Bookstore in Publisher's Way

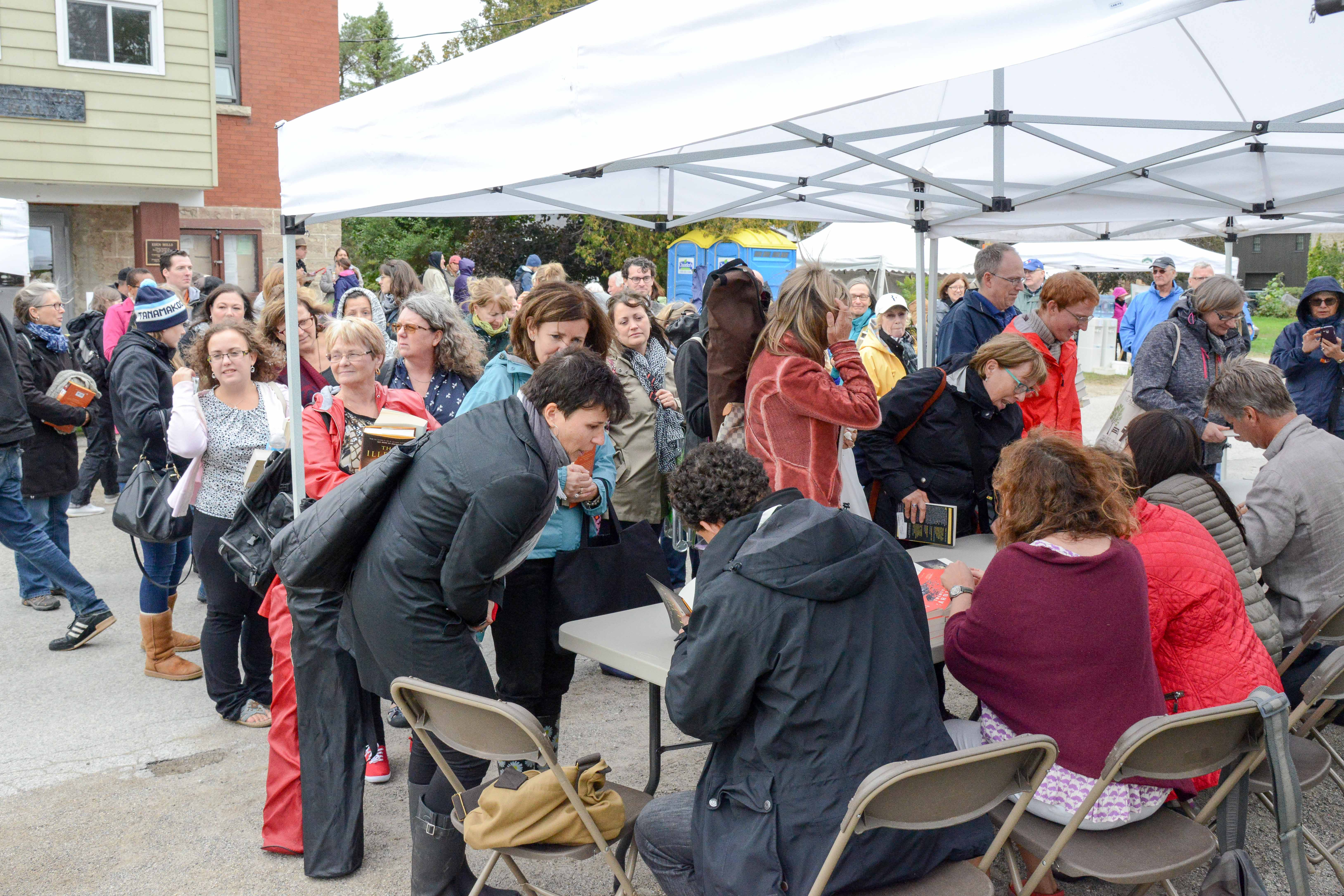
Book signing in Publisher's Way

== Running the Festival ==
The Festival is run completely by volunteers. Many of these volunteers have been with the festival for years, and new ones are recruited each year. It is run by an eight-person board, six of whom are Eden Mills residents. The general membership of approximately 50 people assist with fundraising, operations, publicity, author selection, entertainment and music. On the day of the festival, 60 volunteers help with activities. Private sites are offered free of charge for readings, expressing the local support and generosity typical of this festival.

== Green festival ==
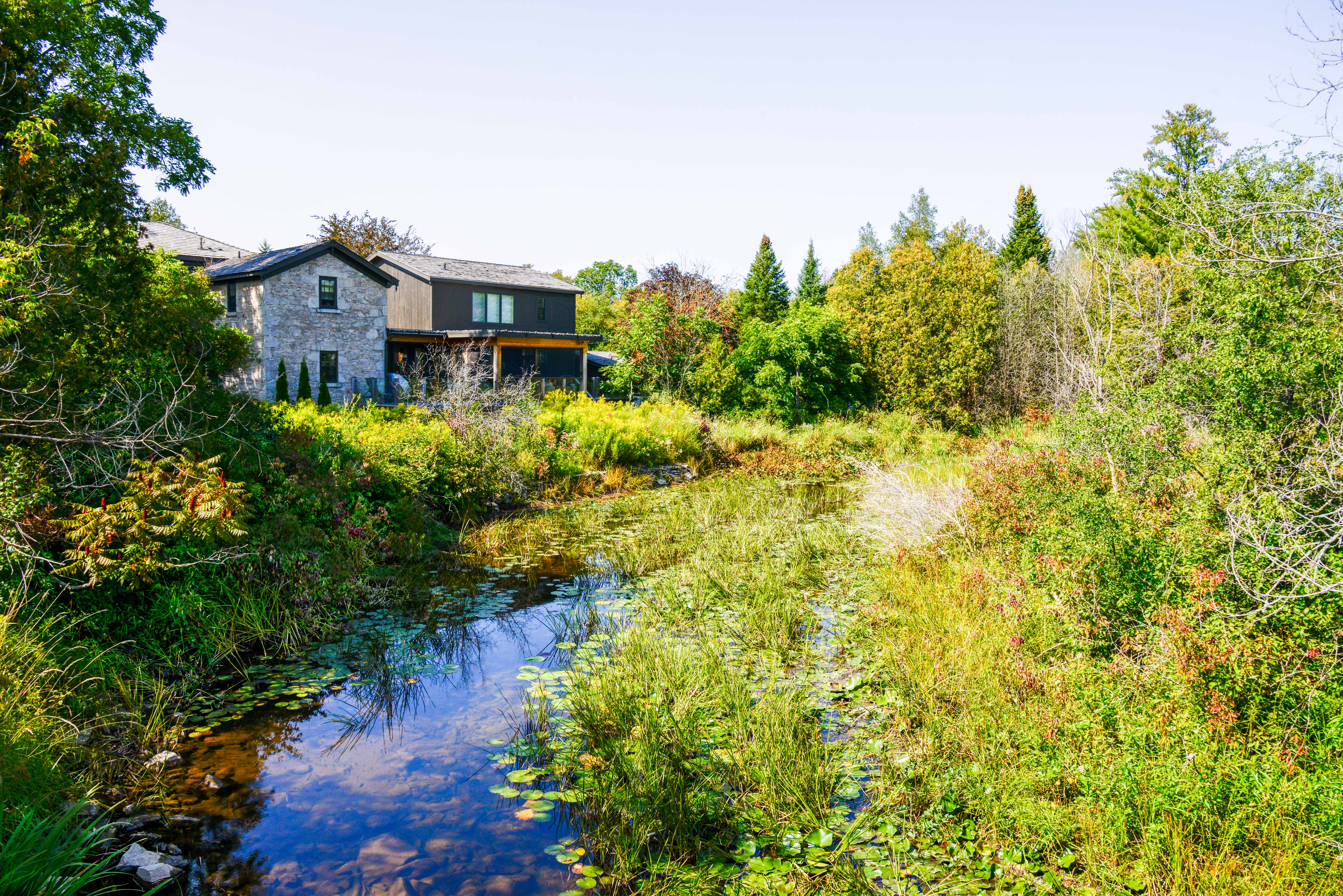
The Eramosa River

Eden Mills is the first community in North America to attempt to have a carbon-neutral footprint. This is reflected in the festival planning and activities. The Eden Mills Writers' festival undertakes several precautions:

"To avoid landfill-clogging plastic bottles, Eden Mills brings in a water tank to dispense treated water to thirsty attendees. Festival volunteers discourage the use of disposable food containers by transporting dirty dishes by teenaged volunteers on bikes for washing at a neighbouring summer camp. Shuttle buses from downtown Guelph help reduce the need for cars."
