= Henriëtta van Pee =

Dutch artist (1692–1741)

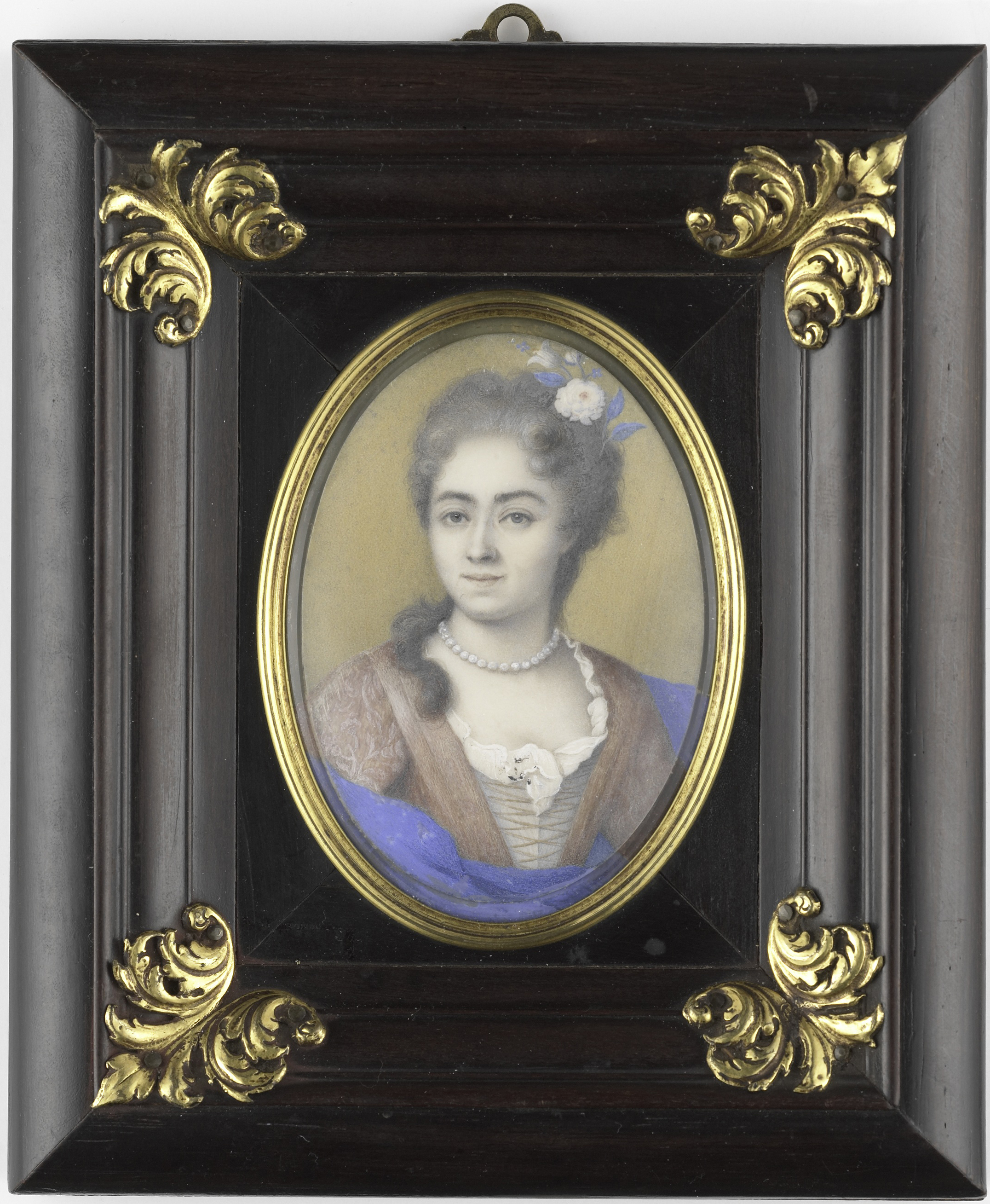
- portrait by Herman Wolters
- Born: 5 December 1692; Amsterdam
- Died: 3 October 1741 (aged 48); Haarlem
- Occupation: Painter

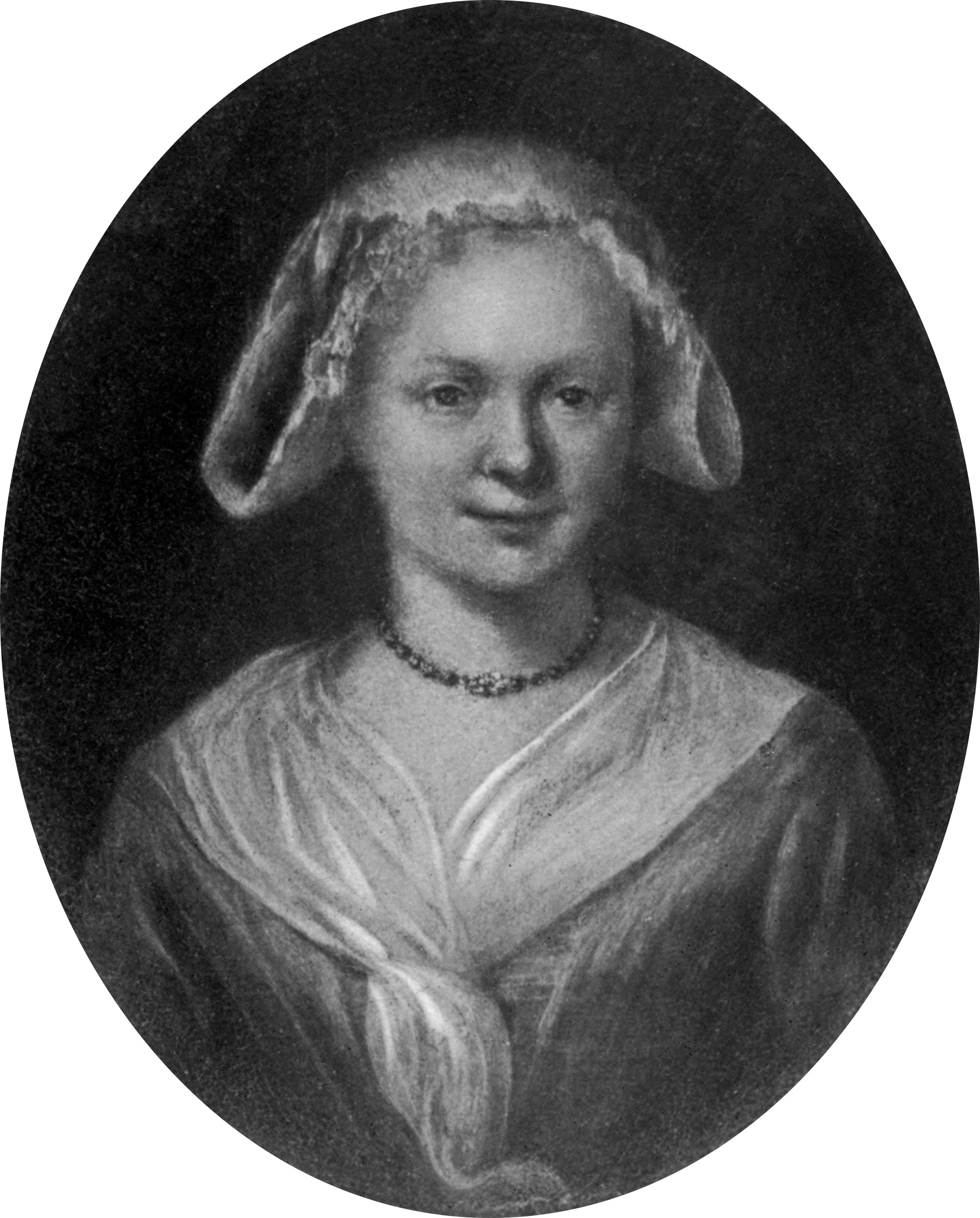
Henriëtta van Pee after a painting by Jan Maurits Quinkhard

Henriëtta van Pee (1692, Amsterdam – 1741, Haarlem), was an 18th-century painter from the Dutch Republic.

== Biography ==
According to the RKD she was the granddaughter of Jan van Pee and the daughter of Theodor van Pee. She married the painter Herman Wolters. She is known for her portraits and copies of the work of other painters, most notably Adriaen van de Velde and Anthony van Dyck.

According to the Institute of Dutch History she was a famous miniature painter who was visited by Peter the Great and Frederick William I of Prussia. In later life she married her father's pupil Herman Wolters, and the marriage remained childless. In 1739 the couple moved to Haarlem where they rented rooms in the proveniershuis there, where the well-known Haarlem playwright Pieter Langendijk, and the Finnish giant Daniel Cajanus also lived. At that time, the proveniershof also housed a city inn and it was the place where the stage coach stopped in Haarlem, so it was an important public meeting place and a popular destination for travellers.

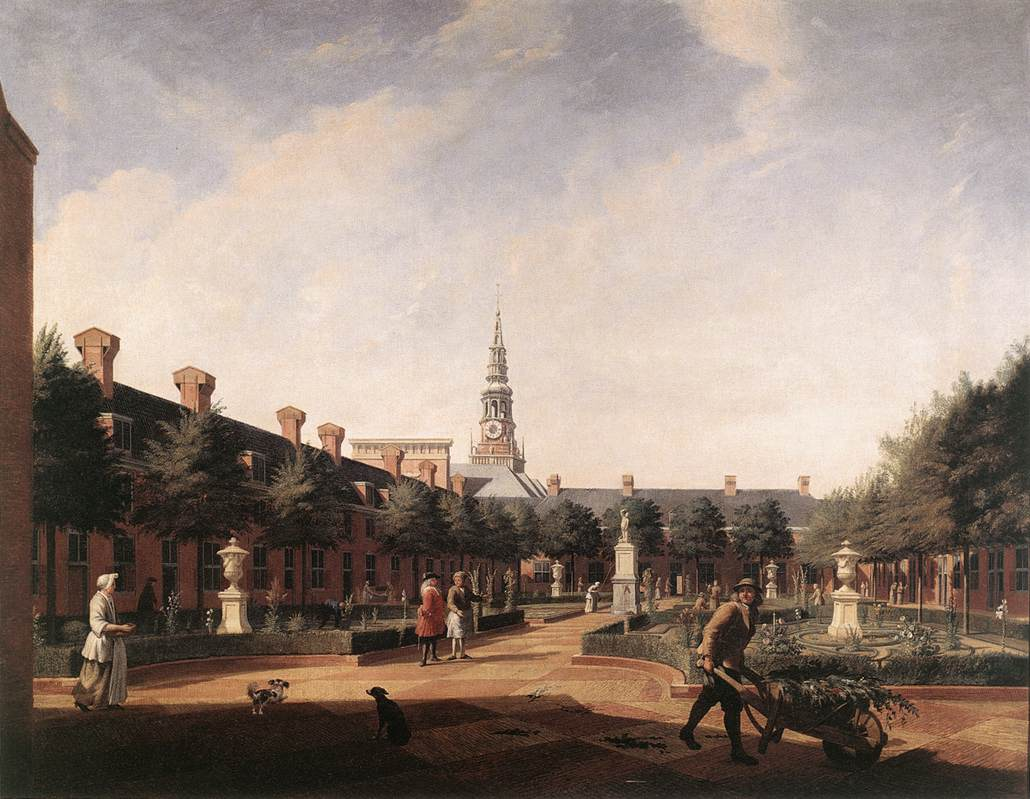
The Courtyard of the Proveniershof, 1735, by Vincent Laurensz van der Vinne II

Her biography was written by Johan van Gool and Jean-Baptiste Descamps. She was considered remarkable in her time as a clever female painter, but her work is not considered as good today as it was in the 18th century. The miniature painter Maria Machteld van Sypesteyn was her pupil.
