= Van Dalen =

Van Dalen is a Dutch toponymic surname meaning "from/of Dalen", a town in the province of Drenthe. Variant spellings are "Van Daalen" and Van Daelen. The name sometimes may be a hypercorrection of the form Van Dale, with the meaning "from (the) valley". Notable people with the surname include:

Van Dalen

- Cornelis van Dalen (1885–1953), Dutch sports shooter
- Dirk van Dalen (born 1932), Dutch mathematician and historian
- Hugo van Dalen (1888–1967), Dutch pianist, composer and publisher
- Jan van Dalen (fl. 1632–1670), Flemish painter
- Jeanine van Dalen (born 1986), Dutch football defender
- Leon van Dalen (born 1979), Dutch football midfielder
- Lucy van Dalen (born 1988), New Zealand middle-distance runner
- Patricia van Dalen (born 1955), Venezuelan artist
- Peter van Dalen (born 1958), Dutch Christian Union politician
- Pieter van Dalen (born 1966), South African politician

Van Daalen

- Constantijn van Daalen (1884–1931), Dutch gymnast
- Eeldert Christiaan van Daalen (1822–1879), Royal Dutch East Indies kolonel
- Gotfried Coenraad Ernst van Daalen (1863–1930), Lieutenant General of the Royal Dutch East Indies
- Maria van Daalen (born 1950), pseudonym of Dutch poet and writer Maria de Rooij

Van Daelen

- Deborah van Daelen (born 1989), Dutch volleyball player

Van Dale

- Anton van Dale (1638–1708), Dutch Mennonite preacher, physician and writer
- Danick Vandale (born 1992), Canadian racing cyclist
- Johan Hendrik van Dale (1838–1872), Dutch teacher, archivist, and lexicographer (creator of the Van Dale dictionary)
- Leah Van Dale (born 1987), American professional wrestler, dancer and model

== See also ==
- Van Dale, leading dictionary of the Dutch language
- Van Daele, Flemish surname
- Van Daalen River, river in Western New Guinea
