= Starfish Greathearts Foundation =

International non-governmental organisation

- Founded: May 2001; 25 years ago London, England, U.K.
- Type: Non-governmental organisation
- Purpose: Orphans and vulnerable children in South Africa
- Location(s): Johannesburg, South Africa; London, England; New York, United States
- Method: Fundraising, Community Based Organisations
- Website: starfish-greathearts.org

Starfish Greathearts Foundation is an international non-governmental organisation formed in 2001 to help orphaned and vulnerable children in South Africa. Its mission is to help make a difference in the lives of such children via community-based projects working at grassroots level. This enables individual communities to develop their own solutions to fight the challenges they come across. As of January 2022, Starfish projects have reached more than 220,000 children in 110 communities across South Africa.</ref> Starfish Greathearts Foundation.

Starfish Greathearts Foundation is registered as a charity in the following countries:

United Kingdom, charity (1093862) and company (4528018) South Africa, non-profit organization (039-447-NPO), Section 21 Company (2003/002865/08) and Public Benefit Organization (930008639) United States, 501(c)3 organization (EIN 20–3622548)

Starfish Greathearts Foundation UK is a member of StopAIDS as well as the Fundraising Regulator, a self-regulatory scheme to ensure best practice in fundraising. Starfish Greathearts Foundation USA holds the platinum seal, being the highest seal of accreditation with Guidestar and has a rating of 95% with Charity Navigator (2022).

== Types of assistance ==
=== Crisis intervention ===
Starfish offers comprehensive care for orphaned and vulnerable children, with a focus on key areas for healthy development; health, nutrition, protection and education.

- Health: Mobile health clinics known as the wellness wagons provide check-ups, referrals, and community health awareness sessions. These clinics ensure the physical, mental, and social well-being of children, and keep them in school to maximise their learning potential.
- Nutrition: Food parcels and nutrition are provided to impoverished children, ensuring improved childhood growth, development and health. Starfish trains local partners to establish food gardens, providing nutrition, income and a space to learn about healthy eating.
- Protection: Starfish-trained care workers identify vulnerable children in the community and provide holistic care. From creches to vocational training for school graduates, this enables children to harness their talents and gain sustainable employment.
- Education: Starfish provides pre-school and after-school care where children enjoy creative educational activities and counseling sessions. The aim is to enable children to harness their talents and gain sustainable employment. Practical support such as schoolbooks, uniforms, transport, and meals is also provided.

=== Working with communities ===
It is widely accepted, based on experience of the organisations in South Africa and throughout the rest of the continent where large populations of AIDS orphans exist, that the best models of care for vulnerable and orphaned children are found within the children's communities and not in institutions.

For centuries, communities in Africa have helped neighbours during upheaval. But the huge number of children orphaned by HIV/AIDS and COVID-19 in South Africa needing support imply that community groups require assistance to constructively care for children. Starfish and partners provide:

- Healthcare and nutritional support.
- Daycare and pre-school for infants and young children.
- Psycho-social care for traumatised children.
- Homework support for older children.
- Safe and caring environments for children to play and socialise.
- Government grant facilitation for child-headed households and foster care families.
- Caregivers giving direct support for child-headed households until children can be linked to foster care families.

=== Building sustainable capacity ===
There currently exist thousands of Community Based Organizations (CBOs) that run to support orphaned children and adults at risk due to HIV/AIDS. These organisations deliver a multitude of education and health support services. However, donors and the government are unable to work with these CBOs because they have no formal framework, infrastructures such as bank accounts, or non-profit organisation registration. Staff and volunteers require training and skills around budgeting and financial management, fundraising, business plans and codes of conduct. The majority of staff and volunteers have also received little or no training in regard to care of orphans and children's rights. Starfish works to add to the capacity and impact of these grassroots organisations through the provision of training and mentoring, empowering communities to respond to the needs of orphans in their area in the long term. The aim is to develop a large number of stable and well-run CBOs capable of working with the government to ensure delivery of care, resources and services to children made orphaned by the HIV/AIDS pandemic.

The Starfish training and mentoring program focuses on CBOs that have reached a certain level of development, and require a program of training and support with a capacity-building approach to achieve their full potential and output levels. Training includes orphan care, children's rights, bookkeeping and donor acquisition to help the CBOs become sustainable in the long run.

== Fundraising highlights ==
Key income generating activities include:

Campaigns and Community Support: The supporter base of Starfish Greathearts Foundation is based on support from individuals through donations and income generated through campaigns. The Dinners of Hope Campaign is a popular ongoing campaign from Starfish. It is simple in the fact that everyone has to eat and therefore everyone can participate in the campaign. The emphasis of this campaign brings a chance to educate, communicate and raise funds with minimal input. The concept is supporters are asked to host a meal for family, friends or colleagues and then ask guests for a donation rather than a contribution to the meal. The campaign also works as a tool in promoting HIV/AIDS awareness and education. The campaign has mobilised more than 20,000 individuals and 120 corporations across the globe to participate

Charitable Trust and Foundations Support: Support from charitable trusts, foundations and development agencies form an important part of maintaining the work of Starfish. The organisation has a track record of securing grants of varying sizes in the UK, USA and South Africa. The Coca-Cola Africa Foundation donated over R1.2 million to Starfish in the year 2003 for key projects in KwaZulu-Natal, whilst more recently The Makro Foundation donated R240,000 towards children's educational needs in the Thandanani Program.

In the UK, the charity is supported by more than 50 charitable trusts and foundations with grants ranging from £200 to more than £70,000 from organisations. Starfish has previously received statutory support from Isle of Man Government Overseas Aid Committee.

Corporate Support: Corporate supporters globally has included Anglo American plc, BP, Coca-Cola, SABMiller plc, Virgin Atlantic, Virgin Media, Virgin Megastores and Xstrata. Saracens Premiership Rugby Club, also known as Saracens F.C., is the latest major partner to lend their support to the charity having visited one of their projects in January 2009.

US President's Emergency Plan For AIDS Relief: Much of the expansion of the charity's work in South Africa has only been possible through the support of the President's Emergency Plan For AIDS Relief, which has donated more than R30 million until date. In 2003, the US President's Emergency Plan for AIDS Relief (PEPFAR) was launched to combat global HIV/AIDS – the largest commitment by any nation to combat a single disease in history.
