= Dirk Dalens =

Dutch painter

- Born: Dirk Dalens; 1657; Amsterdam
- Died: 1687 (aged 29–30); Amsterdam
- Known for: Painting
- Movement: Baroque

Dirk Dalens the Younger (1657 Amsterdam – buried 24 August 1687 Amsterdam) was a Dutch painter.

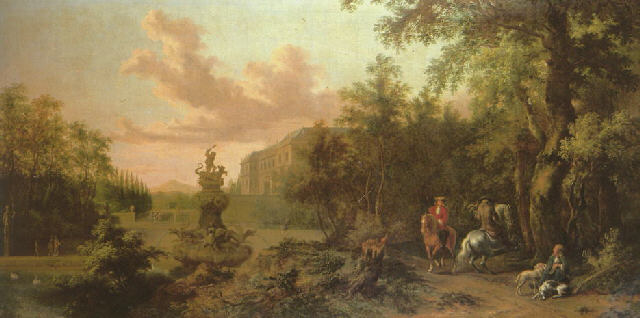
A hawking party in a wooded parkland with a view of a water fountain and a villa beyond. ca. 1680

== Biography ==
He was a student of his father, Willem Dalens, and his grandfather Dirck Dalens the Elder, who specialized in landscapes. He died young at the age of 29, leaving his wife pregnant with Dirk Dalens III.
