= Jan Ekels the Younger =

Dutch painter

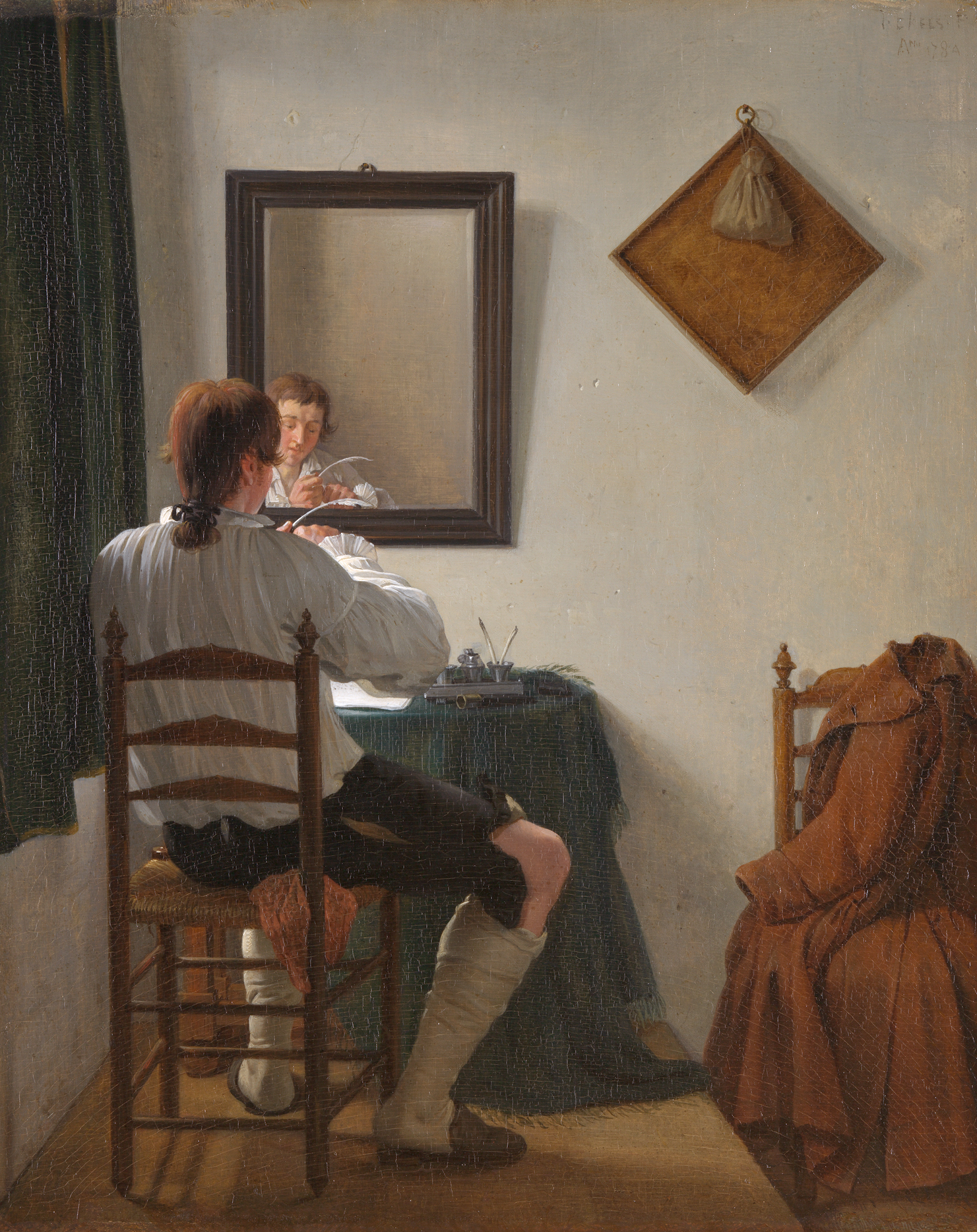
A Writer Trimming his Pen, 1784, now in the Rijksmuseum Amsterdam

Jan Ekels the Younger (1759–1793) was a Dutch painter and draftsman of genre pieces and an imitator of the old masters, especially of J. Molenaer, Gerard Ter Borch and Gabriel Metsu.

Jan Hermannus was born in Amsterdam and baptized in a hidden or clandestine church in Kalverstraat. He was trained by his father Jan Ekels the Elder living at Herengracht. From 1776 to 1778 he studied in Paris, where he was introduced to French neoclassicism and Jean Siméon Chardin. In 1781 he won the first prize of the drawing academy and as a gift he received a medal and a book on painting and drawing by Gerard de Lairesse.

In 1783 he and two friends travelled along the Rhine and stayed in Düsseldorf. In the same year he was admitted to the Felix Meritis. He never married and lived at Nieuwe Doelenstraat in an expensive hotel after his mother died; Jan was her only heir. The artist died at the age of 34 probably as a result of a stroke. He was buried nearby at Nieuwezijds Kapel.

His drawings contains several male nudes. Two pictures by him, one representing A young Man drawing, and the other A Peasant lighting a Pipe, are in the Städel Gallery at Frankfurt.
