= Shawn Van Daele =

Artist, photographer, and founder of the Drawing Hope Project

Shawn Van Daele is an artist, photographer, and founder of the Drawing Hope Project. From Eden Mills, Ontario, Van Daele has traveled across Canada and the United States to support sick children. His stated goals include bringing attention to sicknesses children have, and emphasizing organ donation.
