= Dirck Dalens the Elder =

Dutch Golden Age painter

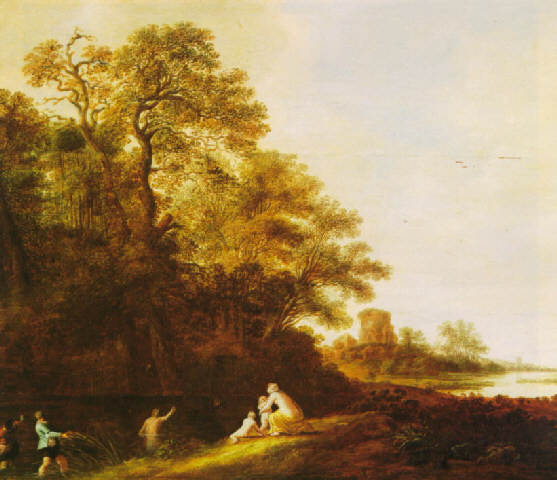
Landscape with Latona and her children and the Lycian peasants being turned into frogs.

Dirck Dalens the Elder (c. 1600, Dordrecht – 1676, Zierikzee) was a Dutch Golden Age painter.

== Biography ==
According to the RKD he was the father and teacher of the painters Jan and Willem Dalens and the grandfather van Dirk Dalens. He moved to The Hague in 1627 after marrying in Dordrecht the same year. In 1632 he became a member of the painter's guild of The Hague. In 1636 he received permission to sell 80 paintings on the condition that he leave the city for two years. In that document he is referred to as a painter and a schoolmaster. The same year he claimed the guild forced him to sign the contract and thanks to his father-in-law vouching for him in the city council he was allowed to return to The Hague in 1637. In the years 1637-1642 he bought and sold some properties there and in 1642 he became burger. In 1648 he was paid 1200 guilders for four "over-the-mantel" pieces for Paleis Noordeinde. In 1658 he married for the second time and in the same year he was one of the founders of the Confrerie Pictura.

In 1676 he fled to Zierikzee after accusations of incest with his 17-year-old daughter Maria from his second marriage. He was influenced by Moses van Uyttenbroeck in The Hague, and besides his career there, he spent a year at Leiden in 1636-1637 and some years in Rotterdam in the early 1660s.
