= Jan Ekels the Elder =

Dutch painter

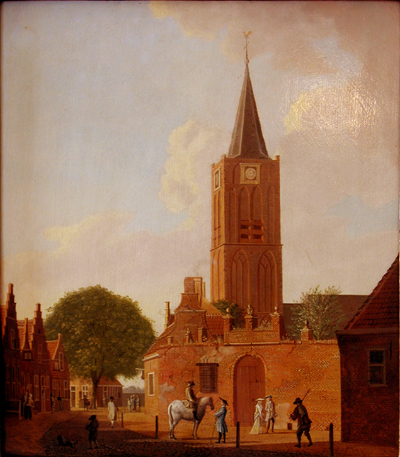
Beverwijk: view on Peperstraat from Koningstraat with the Wijker Toren

Jan Ekels the Elder (1725–1780) was a Dutch painter of vedute. His pictures are generally of a small size, and are highly finished, with a good effect of light and shade.

He was born near Oude Kerk, Amsterdam at Bierkaai. The family was Catholic, but not much is known about his baptism. His father ran a paint shop; his uncle was an alcoholic. At the age of 28, Ekels became paralyzed, and thereafter was able to perform only light work. He married Maria Abt in 1756 and had his three children baptized in the Mozes en Aäronkerk and in a hidden church in the Kalverstraat.

Jan Wagenaar mentions that Ekels was in training with Jan ten Compe and a pupil of Dirk Dalens, the younger. His work is influenced by Jan van der Heyden. Ekels could not make a living with his vedute of Amsterdam and Maastricht; he earned more as a restorer of paintings. He lived at Herengracht, near De Krijtberg, but died at Kerkstraat, opposite Amstelkerk. Ekels was buried in the Nieuwezijds Kapel. His only pupil was Jan Ekels the Younger.
