= List of Guelph municipal elections =

This is a list of municipal elections held in Guelph, Ontario, Canada.

- 1991 Guelph municipal election
- 1994 Guelph municipal election
- 1997 Guelph municipal election
- 2000 Guelph municipal election
- 2003 Guelph municipal election
- 2006 Guelph municipal election
- 2010 Guelph municipal election
- 2014 Guelph municipal election
- 2018 Guelph municipal election
- 2022 Guelph municipal election
