= 2006 Ontario municipal elections =

- November 13, 2006
- Turnout: 41.33% (▲1.15%)

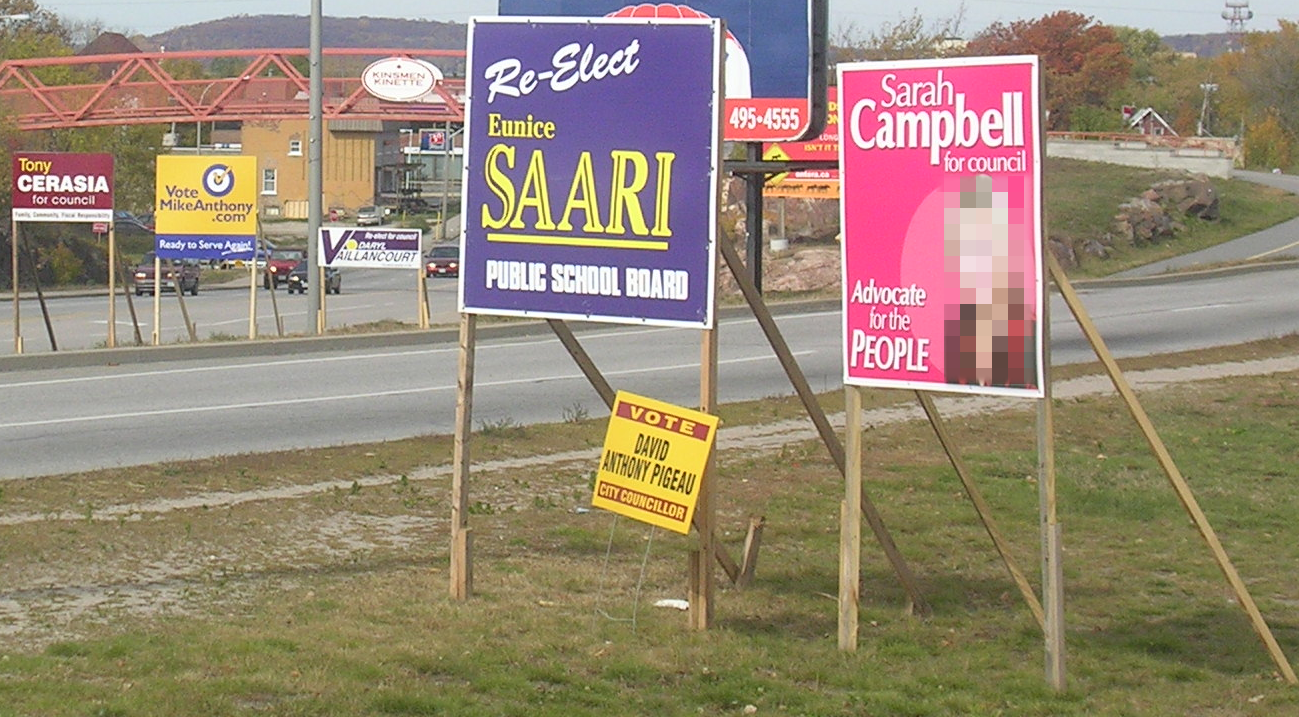
Municipal election signs in North Bay, Ontario.

In the 2006 municipal elections in Ontario, voters in the province of Ontario, elected mayors, councillors, school board trustees and all other elected officials in all of Ontario's municipalities. These elections were regulated by the Municipal Elections Act of Ontario.

== Date ==
Municipal elections in all Ontario municipalities took place on Monday, November 13, 2006 (notwithstanding advance polling arrangements). Currently municipal elections in Ontario have fixed election dates, and the next round of elections are due to take place in November, 2010. Prior to the vote in 2006, the period between elections had been 3 years.

== Voting Notice and Attention ==
Candidates may have withdrawn from the race prior to November 13, 2006, and while their names may still have appeared on the ballot, voting for a withdrawn candidate resulted in a spoiled ballot and was not counted.

== Term lengths ==
The Legislative Assembly of Ontario legislation (Bill 81, Schedule H), passed in 2006, sets the length of terms in office for all municipal elected officials at four years.

== Campaigns in major cities ==
In Toronto's municipal election, incumbent mayor David Miller defeated councillor Jane Pitfield by a wide margin.

Ottawa's heated election featured incumbent mayor Bob Chiarelli finishing third behind victorious businessman Larry O'Brien and former councillor Alex Munter.

In London, incumbent mayor Anne Marie DeCicco-Best defeated Liberal MP Joe Fontana.

In Mississauga, Hazel McCallion, who had been mayor since 1978, won over 90% of the vote.

Larry Di Ianni, Hamilton's mayor, was defeated by former alderman Fred Eisenberger in an extremely close race.

In Greater Sudbury, mayor David Courtemanche was defeated by former NDP MP John Rodriguez.

In Guelph, former mayor Karen Farbridge defeated incumbent mayor Kate Quarrie in a reversal of the 2003 election, when Quarrie defeated then-incumbent Farbridge.

== Municipalities with over 100,000 inhabitants ==
The following lists mayoral races and city council races unless a main article exists, in which case only the mayoral races are listed here. In the tables, candidates marked with an (X) were the incumbent.

=== Barrie ===
Mayoral race

| Candidate | Vote | % |
|---|---|---|
| Dave Aspden | 14,616 | 50.3 |
| Robert J. Hamilton (X) | 12,175 | 41.9 |
| Kevin Harrod | 2,244 | 7.73 |

City council

| Candidate | Vote | % |
|---|---|---|
Ward 1
| Mike Ramsay | 2226 | 48.0 |
| Adam Smith (X) | 1657 | 35.7 |
| Andrew Zyp | 254 | 5.47 |
| Andrea Butcher-Milne | 223 | 4.80 |
| James Wallace | 150 | 3.23 |
| Danielle Laundry | 104 | 2.24 |
| Dwight Robbins | 28 | 0.60 |
Ward 2
| Jeff Lehman | 1877 | 50.0 |
| Connie Positano | 811 | 21.6 |
| Sean Elliott | 749 | 19.9 |
| Todd Tuckey | 289 | 9.69 |
| Darren Roskam | 30 | 0.799 |
Ward 3
| Rodney Jackson | 1197 | 48.3 |
| Bill Garland | 878 | 35.4 |
| Darcy Murray | 271 | 10.9 |
| Jason A. Krynicki | 131 | 5.29 |
Ward 4
| Barry Ward (X) | 1178 | 48.0 |
| Leonard Bugeja | 615 | 25.1 |
| Denise Dicks | 383 | 15.6 |
| Scott Gorry | 220 | 8.97 |
| Peter Simpson | 57 | 2.32 |
Ward 5
| Lynn Strachan (X) | 1293 | 35.4 |
| Peter Silveira | 1214 | 33.2 |
| Kimberley Sweeney-Hyatt | 1149 | 31.4 |
Ward 6
| Michael Prowse (X) | 1539 | 73.7 |
| Daniel Gary Predie, Sr. | 370 | 17.7 |
| Matthew McErlean | 180 | 8.62 |
Ward 7
| John Brassard | 1074 | 52.7 |
| Steve Trotter (X) | 899 | 44.1 |
| Kirk Duffin | 66 | 3.24 |
Ward 8
| Jerry Moore (X) | 1012 | 44.3 |
| Michael Hardie | 705 | 30.9 |
| Stewart McBoyle | 566 | 24.8 |
Ward 9
| Andrew Prince | 1251 | 50.2 |
| Kevin LePage (X) | 1107 | 44.4 |
| Leslie Fox | 134 | 5.38 |
Ward 10
| Alex Nuttall | 1398 | 45.2 |
| Alison Eadie (X) | 566 | 18.3 |
| Ann Hoggarth | 563 | 18.2 |
| Christopher Damas | 304 | 9.82 |
| Erich Jacoby-Hawkins | 241 | 7.78 |
| Paolo Fabrizio | 24 | 0.775 |

=== Brampton ===
Mayoral race

| Candidate | Vote | % |
|---|---|---|
| Susan Fennell (X) | 51,036 | 74.8 |
| Raj Sharda | 9,585 | 14.1 |
| John R. A. Moulton | 4,007 | 5.9 |
| Sunny Gandhi | 2,343 | 3.4 |
| Amjid Iqbal | 1,215 | 1.8 |

=== Burlington ===
Mayoral race

| Candidate | Vote | % |
|---|---|---|
| Cam Jackson | 14,941 | 34.9 |
| Joan Lougheed | 13,687 | 32.0 |
| Rick Burgess | 12,658 | 29.6 |
| Philip Papadoupoulos | 1,393 | 3.3 |
| Stephen Kolcun | 147 | 0.3 |

City and regional council

| Candidate | Vote | % |
|---|---|---|
Ward 1
| Rick Craven (X) | 4826 | 59.0 |
| Marianne Meed Ward | 3352 | 41.0 |
Ward 2
| Peter Thoem | 1627 | 25.0 |
| Cheryl Craig | 1513 | 23.2 |
| Dave Bedini | 1474 | 22.6 |
| Judy Morrison | 1191 | 18.3 |
| Rob Forbes | 460 | 7.1 |
| Anne Marsden | 246 | 3.8 |
Ward 3
| John Taylor (X) | 3353 | 61.8 |
| Lisa Cooper | 1501 | 27.7 |
| Mike Shepherd | 574 | 10.6 |
Ward 4
| Jack Dennison (X) | 3364 | 34.0 |
| Frank McKeown | 2517 | 25.5 |
| John Versluis | 2085 | 21.1 |
| Jeff Rottar | 1010 | 10.2 |
| Ross Hicks | 915 | 9.3 |
Ward 5
| Rick Goldring | 1848 | 27.6 |
| Casey Cosgrove | 1368 | 20.4 |
| Fred Suter | 1185 | 17.7 |
| Sam Sarraf | 647 | 9.7 |
| Bill Bastien | 503 | 7.5 |
| Vera Kurnitzki-West | 342 | 5.1 |
| Marnie Mellish | 305 | 4.6 |
| David Abbott | 253 | 3.8 |
| Stephen Bauld | 243 | 3.6 |
Ward 6
| Carol D'Amelio (X) | 3075 | 61.3 |
| Catherine Brady | 1732 | 34.5 |
| Robert Herriot | 209 | 4.2 |

=== Cambridge ===
Mayoral race

| Candidate | Vote | % |
|---|---|---|
| Doug Craig (X) | 11274 | 51.0 |
| Margaret Barr | 8972 | 40.6 |
| Michael A. Sahagian | 761 | 3.4 |
| John Oprea | 647 | 2.9 |
| Marsha Gail Kriss | 446 | 2.0 |

=== Chatham-Kent ===
Mayoral race

| Candidate | Vote | % |
|---|---|---|
| Randy Hope | 11578 | 31.5 |
| Diane Gagner (X) | 9060 | 24.7 |
| Walter Spence | 7649 | 20.8 |
| Chip Gordon | 6532 | 17.8 |
| Richard Erickson | 1381 | 3.8 |
| Dim Desat | 265 | 0.7 |
| Mary Kwong Lee | 262 | 0.7 |

=== Greater Sudbury ===
Mayoral race

2006 Greater Sudbury municipal election: Mayor of Greater Sudbury
| Candidate | Votes | % |
|---|---|---|
| John Rodriguez | 28,419 | 51.89 |
| (x)David Courtemanche | 16,600 | 30.31 |
| Lynne Reynolds | 8,996 | 16.42 |
| David Chevrier | 429 | 0.78 |
| Marc Crockford | 159 | 0.29 |
| Ed Pokonzie | 92 | 0.17 |
| David Popescu | 76 | 0.14 |
| Total valid votes | 54,771 | 100.00 |

City council: See separate article.

=== Guelph ===
Mayoral race

| Candidate | Vote | % |
|---|---|---|
| Karen Farbridge | 17689 | 51.0 |
| Kate Quarrie (X) | 12319 | 35.5 |
| Mark Briestensky | 4180 | 12.0 |
| Bev A. Izzillo-Ustation | 523 | 1.5 |

=== Hamilton ===
Mayoral race

| Candidate | Vote | % |
|---|---|---|
| Fred Eisenberger | 54110 | 43.2 |
| Larry Di Ianni (X) | 53658 | 42.8 |
| Diane Elms | 9459 | 7.6 |
| Michael J. Baldasaro | 4520 | 3.6 |
| Gino Speziale | 1274 | 1.0 |
| Steve Leach | 1250 | 1.0 |
| Martin S. Zuliniak | 968 | 0.8 |

City council

- See main article

=== Kingston ===
Mayoral race

| Candidate | Vote | % |
|---|---|---|
| Harvey Rosen (X) | 16,278 | 43.18 |
| Rick Downes | 15,548 | 41.25 |
| Kevin George | 5,870 | 15.57 |

City council

| Candidate | Vote | % |
|---|---|---|
Countryside District
| Joyce MacLeod-Kane | 1547 | 51.23 |
| George Sutherland (X) | 1473 | 48.77 |
Loyalist-Cataraqui District
| Rob Matheson | 1556 | 40.15 |
| Sean Foley | 1403 | 36.21 |
| Jibin Joseph | 916 | 23.64 |
Collins-Bayridge District
| Lisa Osanic | 1818 | 58.14 |
| Bittu George (X) | 1309 | 41.86 |
Lakeside District
| Dorothy Hector | 2254 | 51.72 |
| Ted Brooks | 1180 | 27.08 |
| Mike Singh | 924 | 21.20 |
Portsmouth District
| Mark Gerretsen | 2311 | 67.93 |
| Moe Royer | 788 | 23.16 |
| Kindra Breau | 303 | 8.91 |
Trillium District
| Vicki Schmolka | 2164 | 59.98 |
| John Chown | 1167 | 32.34 |
| Anna Robertson | 277 | 7.68 |
Cataraqui District
| Sara Meers (X) | 1771 | 73.39 |
| Tom Dall | 414 | 17.16 |
| Patrick Foley | 228 | 9.45 |
Kingscourt-Strathcona District
| Steve Garrison (X) | 1727 | 62.17 |
| Rob Gilmour | 1051 | 37.83 |
Williamsville District
| Ed Smith (X) | 834 | 40.31 |
| Brian Evoy | 635 | 30.69 |
| Glenn Barnes | 335 | 16.19 |
| Todd Speck | 185 | 8.94 |
| Andrew Goodridge | 80 | 3.87 |
Sydenham District
| Bill Glover | 1180 | 46.24 |
| Floyd Patterson (X) | 912 | 35.74 |
| Nathaniel Erskine-Smith | 297 | 11.64 |
| Alex Huntley | 163 | 6.39 |
King's Town District
| Rob Hutchison | 1531 | 68.41 |
| Mark Potter | 646 | 28.87 |
| Sean Molloy | 61 | 2.73 |
Pittsburgh District
| Loenore Foster (X) | 2005 | 54.68 |
| Brian D. Reitzel | 910 | 24.82 |
| Richard Moller | 752 | 20.51 |

=== Kitchener ===
Mayoral race

| Candidate | Vote | % |
|---|---|---|
| Carl Zehr (X) | 24520 | 68.0 |
| Janis Hedrich | 7663 | 21.2 |
| John Huemiller | 2917 | 8.1 |
| Frank Kulcsar | 981 | 2.7 |

City council

| Candidate | Vote | % |
|---|---|---|
Bridgeport-Centre Ward (1)
| John D. Smola (X) | 2784 | 44.4 |
| Richard Maass | 1408 | 22.5 |
| Glen Bender | 1278 | 20.4 |
| Jack Byrne | 404 | 6.4 |
| Julian Ichim | 234 | 3.7 |
| Albert Norris | 155 | 2.5 |
Chicopee-Grand River Ward (2)
| Berry Vrbanovic (X) | 4532 | 70.0 |
| Len Carter | 1308 | 20.8 |
| J.D. McGuire | 634 | 10.1 |
Fairview-Gateway Ward (3)
| John A. Gazzola (X) | 3615 | 68.2 |
| Bob McColl | 911 | 17.2 |
| Fitzroy Vanderpool | 773 | 14.6 |
South Ward (4)
| Kelly Galloway | 1740 | 36.3 |
| Mike Harris | 1459 | 30.5 |
| Bill Poole | 573 | 12.0 |
| Marjorie Brown | 521 | 10.9 |
| Victor Herbert | 215 | 4.5 |
| Randy MacDonald | 124 | 2.6 |
| Mike Windley | 96 | 2.0 |
| Tony Kerr | 59 | 1.2 |
Forest-Rockway Ward (5)
| Geoff Lorentz (X) | 3345 | 50.9 |
| Zyg Janecki | 3227 | 49.1 |
West-Victoria Ward (6)
| Christina Weylie (X) | 2181 | 36.1 |
| Scott Piatkowski | 1524 | 25.2 |
| Raj Gill | 1216 | 20.1 |
| Leszek Jankowski | 1121 | 18.6 |

Regional council

| Candidate | Vote | % |
|---|---|---|
| Tom Galloway (X) | 19838 | 18.2 |
| Jean Haalboom (X) | 17034 | 15.6 |
| Jake Smola (X) | 15961 | 14.6 |
| Jim Wideman (X) | 15629 | 14.3 |
| Steven Cage | 11341 | 10.4 |
| Gary R. Ferguson | 6760 | 6.2 |
| Jason Hammond | 6928 | 5.8 |
| Rick Moffitt | 5711 | 5.2 |
| Kurt L. Ditner | 4413 | |
| Daniel Glenn-Graham | 3440 | 3.2 |
| Matthew Ichim | 2581 | 2.4 |

=== London ===
Mayoral race

| Candidate | Vote | % |
|---|---|---|
| Anne Marie DeCicco-Best (X) | 57,891 | 57.7 |
| Joe Fontana | 35,083 | 35.7 |
| Cynthia Etheridge | 2,561 | 2.6 |
| Ivan W. Kasiurak | 1,905 | 1.9 |
| Arthur Majoor | 1,623 | 1.6 |
| Matthew L. R. Shantz | 532 | 0.5 |

Board of control

(Four to be elected)

| Candidate | Vote | % |
|---|---|---|
| Tom Gosnell (X) | 46806 | 16.1 |
| Gina Barber | 46090 | 15.8 |
| Bud Polhill (X) | 39073 | 13.4 |
| Gord Hume (X) | 36620 | 12.6 |
| Russ Monteith (X) | 35497 | 12.2 |
| Tim Gatten | 34452 | 11.8 |
| Brian Rice | 17706 | 6.1 |
| John Walsh | 15047 | 5.2 |
| Joshua Hurwitz | 13704 | 4.7 |
| Peter Schuller | 6059 | 2.1 |

City council

| Candidate | Vote | % |
|---|---|---|
Ward 1
| Roger Caranci (X) | 3825 | 57.1 |
| Gordon Leffley | 1473 | 22.0 |
| Gregory Thomas Fowler | 716 | 10.7 |
| Steven Peter Van Eldik | 680 | 10.2 |
Ward 2
| Bill Armstrong (X) | 3105 | 52.7 |
| Steve Polhill | 2226 | 37.8 |
| Shirley Wilton | 435 | 7.4 |
| Rick Plouffe | 127 | 2.2 |
Ward 3
| Bernie MacDonald (X) | 3725 | 72.5 |
| Rod Morley | 792 | 15.4 |
| David Wagner | 621 | 12.2 |
Ward 4
| Stephen Orser | 1758 | 29.1 |
| Bill Brock | 1325 | 21.9 |
| Greg Thompson | 1303 | 21.5 |
| Henry Zupanc | 1204 | 19.9 |
| J. Daniel O'Neail | 460 | 7.6 |
Ward 5
| Joni Baechler (X) | 7068 | 86.2 |
| Raymond John Ford | 1129 | 13.8 |
Ward 6
| Nancy Ann Branscombe | 3920 | 54.6 |
| Stephen Turner | 2667 | 37.2 |
| Steve Edwards | 301 | 4.2 |
| Bob Howard | 285 | 4.0 |
Ward 7
| Walter G. Lonc | 2896 | 39.7 |
| Ab Chahbar (X) | 2605 | 35.7 |
| Roger Khouri | 904 | 12.4 |
| Terry McPherson | 591 | 8.1 |
| George Istifan | 304 | 4.2 |
Ward 8
| Paul Hubert | 2392 | 28.6 |
| Josh Morgan | 2369 | 28.3 |
| Connie L. Graham | 1855 | 22.1 |
| Monica Jarabek | 1762 | 21.0 |
Ward 9
| Susan Eagle (X) | 4530 | 56.5 |
| Ed Corrigan | 2192 | 27.3 |
| Chester Chwiecko | 1300 | 16.2 |
Ward 10
| Paul Van Meerbergen (X) | 4741 | 69.5 |
| Milyn Edwin Hall | 1087 | 15.9 |
| Jordan Smith | 998 | 14.6 |
Ward 11
| David Winninger (X) | 3957 | 50.7 |
| Denise Brown | 3388 | 43.4 |
| Steve Hunter | 464 | 5.9 |
Ward 12
| Harold Usher (X) | 3035 | 51.7 |
| Thomas A. Foster | 1366 | 23.3 |
| Rober Vaughan | 733 | 12.5 |
| Jesse Haidar | 386 | 6.6 |
| Najam Naqvi | 345 | 5.9 |
Ward 13
| Judy Bryant (X) | 2683 | 52.6 |
| Sandy White (X) | 1534 | 30.0 |
| Stuart Smith | 538 | 10.5 |
| Robert Carlton | 350 | 6.9 |
Ward 14
| Cheryl Miller (X) | 2664 | 40.2 |
| Jim Wood | 1843 | 27.8 |
| Laurie Spence Bannerman | 1569 | 23.7 |
| Ma'in Sinan | 545 | 8.2 |

=== Markham ===
Mayor

| Candidate | Vote | % |
|---|---|---|
| Frank Scarpitti | 48,462 | 82.97 |
| Partap Dua | 4,912 | 8.41 |
| Stephen Kotyck | 3,195 | 5.47 |
| Sam Orrico | 1,840 | 3.15 |

Regional council

| Candidate | Vote | % |
|---|---|---|
| Jim Jones (X) | 29514 | 16.90 |
| Jack Heath (X) | 29037 | 16.63 |
| Tony C. Wong (X) | 25491 | 14.60 |
| Gordon Landon | 23996 | 13.74 |
| Joe Li | 18020 | 10.32 |
| Khalid Usman | 17432 | 9.98 |
| Elagu Elaguppillai | 16246 | 9.30 |
| Arnel Scott | 7938 | 4.55 |
| Carl Bodnar | 6962 | 3.99 |

Town council

| Candidate | Vote | % |
|---|---|---|
Ward 1
| Valerie Burke | 3434 | 58.82 |
| Stan Daurio (X) | 2316 | 39.67 |
| Jason Buchholz | 88 | 1.51 |
Ward 2
| Erin Shapero (X) | 4355 | 82.63 |
| Peter Michael Pavlovic | 699 | 13.26 |
| Howard Shern | 216 | 4.11 |
Ward 3
| Joseph Virgilio (X) | 3327 | 43.06 |
| John Cabrelli | 2013 | 26.05 |
| George Treheles | 718 | 9.29 |
| Kenny Szeto | 575 | 7.44 |
| Ivan Q. Yao | 450 | 5.82 |
| Spaso Jovcevski | 426 | 5.51 |
| Michael Skinner | 216 | 2.79 |
Ward 4
| Carolina Moretti | 3049 | 35.06 |
| Alan Ho | 1723 | 19.81 |
| Nirmala Persaud-Armstrong | 1431 | 16.45 |
| Jim Treacy | 830 | 9.54 |
| Ivy Lam | 731 | 8.40 |
| Tony Boseovski | 651 | 7.48 |
| Brian Weller | 185 | 2.12 |
| Stephen Tonner | 96 | 1.10 |
Ward 5
| John Webster (X) | 5311 | 53.79 |
| Colin Campbell | 3758 | 38.06 |
| Bala Balasubramaniam | 567 | 5.74 |
| James Bush | 237 | 2.40 |
Ward 6
| Dan Horchik (X) | 3151 | 57.48 |
| Jim Kwan | 1871 | 34.13 |
| Wafik Abadir | 460 | 8.39 |
Ward 7
| Logan Kanapathi | 3088 | 33.54 |
| Tessa Benn-Ireland | 1569 | 17.04 |
| Mohammad Rahman | 1272 | 13.82 |
| Yahya Qureshi | 1224 | 13.30 |
| William Jeyaveeran | 775 | 8.42 |
| Jeffrey Ruo | 595 | 6.46 |
| Manpreet Minhas | 343 | 3.73 |
| Syed Zaidi | 340 | 3.69 |
Ward 8
| Alex Chiu (X) | 3431 | 41.17 |
| Ivy Lee | 1533 | 18.40 |
| Thaya Rajah | 1452 | 17.42 |
| Surinder S. Lamba | 1302 | 15.62 |
| Jeremy Choi | 340 | 4.10 |
| Millicent Radway | 275 | 3.30 |

=== Mississauga ===
Mayoral race

| Candidate | Vote | % |
|---|---|---|
| Hazel McCallion (X) | 98,293 | 91.4 |
| Donald Barber | 5,571 | 5.2 |
| Roy N. Willis | 3,667 | 3.4 |

=== Oakville ===
2006 Oakville Town election - Mayor
| Candidate | Votes | % |
|---|---|---|
| Rob Burton | 15,120 | 38.36 |
| Ann Mulvale (X) | 13,484 | 34.21 |
| Chris Stoate | 7,409 | 18.08 |
| Janice Wright | 3,096 | 7.85 |
| Daniela Z. Giecewicz | 309 | 0.78 |

Town & regional council

- See main article

=== Oshawa ===
Mayoral race

| Candidate | Vote | % |
|---|---|---|
| John Gray (X) | 19545 | 72.8 |
| Alexander Kemp | 5846 | 21.8 |
| Dawn Turner | 1461 | 5.4 |

=== Ottawa ===
Mayoral race

| Candidate | Vote | % |
|---|---|---|
| Larry O'Brien | 141262 | 47.1 |
| Alex Munter | 108752 | 36.2 |
| Bob Chiarelli (X) | 46697 | 15.6 |
| Jane Scharf | 1467 | 0.5 |
| Piotr Anweiler | 762 | 0.3 |
| Robert Larter | 667 | 0.2 |
| Barkley Pollock | 432 | 0.1 |

=== Richmond Hill ===
Mayoral race

| Candidate | Vote | % |
|---|---|---|
| Dave Barrow | 22007 | 78.9 |
| David McCann | 2261 | 9.5 |
| Anastasios Baxevanidis | 2276 | 8.2 |
| Ramon Datol | 962 | 3.5 |

Other races

- See main article

=== St. Catharines ===
Mayoral race

| Candidate | Vote | % |
|---|---|---|
| Brian McMullan | 15067 | 39.6 |
| Rob Welch | 6047 | 15.9 |
| Marilyn C. Bodogh | 4412 | 11.6 |
| Jackie Phelan | 3390 | 8.9 |
| Preston Haskell | 3261 | 8.6 |
| Sue Erskine | 3207 | 8.4 |
| Garry Robbins | 2263 | 5.9 |
| Emad Zawady | 411 | 1.1 |

Other races

- See main article

=== Thunder Bay ===
Mayoral race

| Candidate | Vote | % |
|---|---|---|
| Lynn Peterson (X) | 26561 | 84.9 |
| Jim Gamble | 2733 | 8.7 |
| Douglas Mackay | 1988 | 6.4 |

=== Toronto ===
Mayoral race

| Candidate | Votes | % |
|---|---|---|
| David Miller (X) | 332,969 | 57.0 |
| Jane Pitfield | 188,932 | 32.3 |
| Stephen LeDrew | 8,078 | 1.4 |
| Michael Alexander | 5,247 | 0.9 |
| Jaime Castillo | 5,215 | 0.9 |
| Douglas Campbell | 4,183 | 0.7 |
| Hazel Jackson | 3,333 | 0.6 |
| Lee Romano | 3,108 | 0.5 |
| Shaun Bruce | 2,820 | 0.5 |
| Monowar Hossain | 2,726 | 0.5 |
| Joseph Young | 2,264 | 0.4 |
| Kevin Clarke | 2,081 | 0.4 |
| Joel Rubinovich | 1,642 | 0.3 |
| Scott Yee | 1,538 | 0.3 |
| Rodney Muir | 1,458 | 0.2 |
| Nicholas Brooks | 1,397 | 0.2 |
| John Porter | 1,348 | 0.2 |
| Diana-De Maxted | 1,311 | 0.2 |
| David Dicks | 1,283 | 0.2 |
| Duri Naimji | 1,240 | 0.2 |
| Bob Smith | 1,105 | 0.2 |
| Mark Korolnek | 1,079 | 0.2 |
| Glenn Coles | 1,019 | 0.2 |
| Peter Styrsky | 945 | 0.2 |
| Mitch Gold | 880 | 0.2 |
| Ryan Goldhar | 787 | 0.1 |
| Mehmet Ali Yagiz | 753 | 0.1 |
| Ratan Wadhwa | 696 | 0.1 |
| Adam Sit | 663 | 0.1 |
| Paul Sheldon | 624 | 0.1 |
| Dave DuMoulin | 601 | 0.1 |
| Gerald Derome | 578 | 0.1 |
| Thomas Shipley | 574 | 0.1 |
| Soumen Deb | 517 | 0.1 |
| David Schiebel | 498 | 0.1 |
| David Vallance | 486 | 0.1 |
| John Weingust | 312 | 0.1 |
| Mark State | 194 | 0.0 |

City council

- See main article

=== Vaughan ===
Mayoral race

| Candidate | Vote | % |
|---|---|---|
| Linda Jackson | 28396 | 47.3 |
| Michael Di Biase (X) | 28306 | 47.2 |
| Paul Stewart | 2645 | 4.4 |
| Savino Quatela | 637 | 1.1 |

Other races

- See main article

=== Windsor ===
Mayor

| Candidate | Vote | % |
|---|---|---|
| Eddie Francis (X) | 44527 | 77.6 |
| David Wonham | 10308 | 18.0 |
| Mohamed Chams | 1502 | 2.6 |
| Mohamad-Ali Beydoun | 1074 | 1.9 |

Other races

- See main article

== Municipalities with 25,000 to 100,000 people ==
Races for mayor only, see main article for more information. In the tables, candidates marked with an (X) were the incumbent.

| Candidate | Vote | % |
|---|---|---|
Ajax
| Steve Parish (X) | 10,213 | 70.5 |
| Lidia Kuleshnyk | 4,267 | 29.5 |
Aurora
| Phyllis Morris | 5,208 | 42.1 |
| Tim M. Jones (X) | 4,798 | 38.8 |
| Nigel Kean | 2,364 | 19.1 |
Belleville
| Neil Ellis | 10,427 | 61.8 |
| Mary-Anne Sills (X) | 3,957 | 23.5 |
| Doug Rollins | 2,483 | 14.7 |
Brant County
| Ron Eddy (X) | 6300 | 67.2 |
| Shawn Pratt | 3073 | 22.8 |
Brantford (see 2006 Brantford municipal election)
| Mike Hancock (X) | 13212 | 49.2 |
| Chris Friel | 13047 | 48.6 |
| Winston C. Ferguson | 360 | 1.3 |
| John Turmel | 226 | 0.8 |
Caledon
| Marolyn Morrison (X) | 7150 | 51.8 |
| Garry Moore | 5084 | 36.8 |
| Norm Calder | 1572 | 11.4 |
Clarington
| Jim Abernethy | 11204 | 49.7 |
| John Mutton (X) | 5968 | 26.5 |
| Jim Schell | 4596 | 20.4 |
| Richard Ward | 495 | 2.2 |
| Wayne J. Chaskavich | 291 | 1.3 |
Cornwall
| Bob Kilger | 8363 | 49.2 |
| Korey Kennedy | 3963 | 23.3 |
| Phil Poirier (X) | 2660 | 15.7 |
| Paul Connolly | 1072 | 6.3 |
| Leslie O'Shaughnessy | 928 | 5.5 |
Fort Erie
| Douglas G. Martin | 4867 | 53.1 |
| Tom Lewis | 2733 | 29.8 |
| John Papadakis | 1566 | 17.1 |
Georgina
| Robert Grossi (X) | 6653 | 62.5 |
| Peter Juras | 3999 | 37.5 |
Haldimand County
| Marie Trainer (X) | 6401 | 39.8 |
| Bernie Corbett | 5146 | 32.0 |
| Lorraine Bergstrand | 4551 | 28.3 |
Halton Hills
| Rick Bonnette (X) | 10442 | 88.0 |
| Robert Heaton | 1429 | 12.0 |
Innisfil
| Brian H. Jackson (X) | 6877 | 58.6 |
| Barbara Baguley | 3188 | 27.2 |
| Jim Roberts | 1661 | 14.2 |
Kawartha Lakes
| Ric McGee | 7,032 | 26.9 |
| Andy Letham | 6,351 | 24.3 |
| John O'Reilly | 4,429 | 16.9 |
| John R. Macklem | 3,977 | 15.2 |
| Lynne Boldt | 3,631 | 13.9 |
| Ken Gorham | 751 | 2.9 |
Lakeshore
| Tom Bain | 4,116 | 36.5 |
| David Tremblay | 3,464 | 30.7 |
| Len Janisse | 3,072 | 27.2 |
| Nick Panasiuk | 622 | 5.5 |
LaSalle
| Gary Baxter | 3,661 | 45.6 |
| Sue Hamdon | 2,762 | 34.4 |
| Joe Durocher | 1,609 | 20.0 |
Leamington
| John M. Adams (X) | ACCLAIMED | |
Milton
| Gord Krantz (X) | 6,347 | 53.9 |
| Gerry Marsh | 3,364 | 28.6 |
| Al Volpe | 2,063 | 17.5 |
Newmarket
| Tony Van Bynen | 8,012 | 48.1 |
| Diane Springstein | 7,245 | 43.5 |
| John Ashworth | 842 | 5.1 |
| Michael Cascione | 366 | 2.2 |
| Wendy Thibideau | 177 | 1.1 |
New Tecumseth
| Mike MacEachern (X) | 4,815 | 64.8 |
| Helga Elie | 1,678 | 22.6 |
| Tom Carter | 936 | 12.6 |
Niagara Falls
| Ted Salci (X) | 11,820 | 47.0 |
| Wayne Campbell | 8,544 | 34.0 |
| Steve King | 4,285 | 17.0 |
| Ringo Beam | 506 | 2.0 |
Norfolk County
| Dennis Travale | 7230 | 36.6 |
| Frank Nightingale | 6362 | 32.2 |
| Peter Black | 3818 | 19.3 |
| Gary Muntz | 2353 | 11.9 |
North Bay (see 2006 Nipissing District municipal elections#North Bay)
| Vic Fedeli (X) | 12168 | 67.2 |
| Stan Lawlor | 5931 | 32.8 |
Orangeville
| Rob Adams (X) | 3463 | 49.9 |
| Nick Garisto | 2076 | 29.9 |
| Jim MacGregor | 1038 | 14.9 |
| Brent Blackburn | 365 | 5.3 |
Orillia
| Ron Stevens (X) | 4400 | 48.2 |
| Roy Menagh | 2790 | 30.5 |
| Ken McCann | 1848 | 20.2 |
Peterborough (see 2006 Peterborough municipal election
| D. Paul Ayotte | 12095 | 48.6 |
| Linda Slavin | 5569 | 22.4 |
| Paul Rexe | 2609 | 10.5 |
| Bill Juby | 1646 | 6.6 |
| John Pritchard | 1088 | 4.4 |
| David R. Edgerton | 920 | 3.7 |
| Garry Herring | 721 | 2.9 |
| Gord Vass | 238 | 1.0 |
Pickering
| Dave Ryan (X) | 12588 | 71.1 |
| John S. Newell | 5108 | 28.9 |
Quinte West
| John Williams | 8033 | 63.1 |
| Bob Campney (X) | 3324 | 26.1 |
| Sandra Carter | 1321 | 10.4 |
| Claude'or du-Lude | 59 | 0.46 |
Sault Ste. Marie
| John Rowswell (X) | 15932 | 56.5 |
| Debbie Amaroso | 8460 | 30.0 |
| Fred Dovigi | 3822 | 15.5 |
Sarnia
| Mike Bradley (X) | 12623 | 57.1 |
| Joe Murray | 6421 | 29.0 |
| Dick Carpani | 2747 | 12.4 |
| Carlos Murray | 332 | 1.5 |
St. Thomas
| Cliff Barwick | 5242 | 51.7 |
| Jeff Kohler (X) | 4595 | 45.3 |
| Jim Jones | 296 | 3.0 |
Stratford
| Dan Mathieson (X) | 7399 | 75.9 |
| Rick Johnson | 2350 | 24.1 |
Tecumseh
| Gary McNamara (X) | 7772 | 82.9 |
| Ray Graveline | 1607 | 17.1 |
Timmins
| Tom Laughren | ACCLAIMED | |
Waterloo (see 2006 Waterloo municipal election)
| Brenda Halloran | 11459 | 50.5 |
| Herb Epp (X) | 7364 | 32.4 |
| Brian Turnbull | 3881 | 17.1 |
Welland
| Damian Goulbourne (X) | 6484 | 38.1 |
| John Mastroianni | 5086 | 29.9 |
| Daniel M. Fortier | 3089 | 18.2 |
| John Parisee | 2049 | 12.0 |
| John Watt | 310 | 1.8 |
Whitby
| Pat Perkins | 9784 | 50.5 |
| Marcel Brunelle (X) | 9589 | 49.5 |
Woodstock
| Michael Harding (X) | 3518 | 37.6 |
| Trevor Birtch | 2271 | 24.3 |
| Brian Currah | 1832 | 19.6 |
| David Nadalan | 1723 | 18.4 |

== Municipalities with 5,000 to 25,000 people ==
(Elected mayors shown only)

| Municipality | Elected |
|---|---|
| Adjala–Tosorontio | Tom Walsh (X) |
| Alnwick/Haldimand | William Finley (X) |
| Amherstburg | Wayne Hurst (X) |
| Arnprior | Terry Gibeau (X) |
| Arran–Elderslie | Ron L. Oswald (X) |
| Ashfield–Colborne–Wawanosh | Ben Van Diepenbeek (X) (acc.) |
| Augusta | Mel Campbell |
| Aylmer | Bob Habkirk |
| Bayham | Lynn Acre (X) |
| Beckwith | Richard Kidd (X) (acc.) |
| Blandford-Blenheim | Kenn R. Howling |
| Bluewater | Bill Dowson (X) |
| Bracebridge | Don Coates |
| Bradford West Gwillimbury | Doug White |
| Brighton | Chris Herrington (X) |
| Brock | Larry O'Connor |
| Brockton | Charlie Bagnato (X) |
| Brockville | David Henderson |
| Carleton Place | Paul Dulmage (X) |
| Cavan-Monaghan | Neal Cathcart (X) |
| Central Elgin | Sylvia Hofhuis |
| Central Huron | Bert Dykstra (X) (acc.) |
| Centre Wellington | Joanne Ross-Zuj |
| Chatsworth | Howard Greig (X) (acc.) |
| Clearview | Ken Ferguson |
| Cobourg | Peter Delanty (X) |
| Cochrane | Lawrence Martin (X) |
| Collingwood | Chris Carrier |
| Cramahe | Marc Coombs |
| Douro-Dummer | J. Murray Jones (acc.) |
| Drummond/North Elmsley | Aubrey Churchill (X) (acc.) |
| Dryden | Anne Krassilowsky (X) (acc.) |
| East Gwillimbury | James R. Young (X) |
| East Zorra-Tavistock | Don McKay (X) (acc.) |
| Edwardsburgh/Cardinal | Larry Dishaw |
| Elizabethtown-Kitley | Jim Pickard (X) (acc.) |
| Elliot Lake | Rick Hamilton |
| Erin | Rod Finnie (X) |
| Espanola | Bernie Gagnon (X) (acc.) |
| Essa | David Guergis (X) (acc.) |
| Essex | Ron McDermott (X) |
| Fort Frances | Roy Avis |
| Gananoque | James E. Garrah (X) (acc.) |
| Georgian Bluffs | Alan Barfoot |
| Goderich | Deb Shewfelt (X) (acc.) |
| Gravenhurst | John Klinck (X) |
| Greater Napanee | Gordon Schermerhorn (X) |
| Greenstone | Michael Power (X) |
| Grey Highlands | Brian Mullin (X) |
| Grimsby | Robert Bentley (X) |
| Guelph/Eramosa | Chris White |
| Hamilton | Mark Lovshin |
| Hanover | Kathi Maskell (acc.) |
| Hearst | Roger Sigouin (X) (acc.) |
| Huntsville | Claude Doughty |
| Huron East | Joe Seili (X) |
| Huron-Kinloss | Mitch Twolan](X) (acc.) |
| Ingersoll | Paul Holbrough (X) |
| Iroquois Falls | Gilles E. Forget |
| Kapuskasing | Alan Spacek |
| Kenora | Len Compton |
| Kincardine | Larry Kraemer |
| King | Margaret Black (X) |
| Kingsville | Nelson Santos (X) |
| Kirkland Lake | Bill Enouy (S) (acc.) |
| Lambton Shores | Gord Minielly |
| Laurentian Valley | Jack Wilson |
| Leeds and the Thousand Islands | Frank Kinsella |
| Lincoln | Bill Hodgson (X) (acc.) |
| Loyalist | Clayton McEwan (X) (acc.) |
| Malahide | John R. Wilson (X) (acc.) |
| Mapleton | John Green (X) (acc.) |
| McNab/Braeside | Mary Campbell |
| Meaford | Wally Reif (X) |
| Middlesex Centre | Al Edmondson (X) (acc.) |
| Midland | James Downer |
| Minden Hills | Jim McMahon (X) |
| Minto | David Anderson |
| Mississippi Mills | Al Lunney (X) |
| Mono | Lorie Haddock |
| Muskoka Lakes | Susan Pryke (X) |
| Niagara-on-the-Lake | Gary Burroughs (X) |
| North Dumfries | Kim Denouden (X) (acc.) |
| North Dundas | Alvin Runnalls (X) |
| North Glengarry | Grant Crack |
| North Grenville | Bill Gooch (X) |
| North Middlesex | Wesley J. Hodgson (X) (acc.) |
| North Perth | Edwin Hollinger (X) |
| North Stormont | Dennis Fife (X) (acc.) |
| Norwich | Donald Doan |
| Oliver Paipoonge | Lucy Kloosterhuis (X) |
| Oro-Medonte | Harry Hughes |
| Otonabee-South Monaghan | David Nelson (acc.) |
| Owen Sound | Ruth Lovell (X) (acc.) |
| Parry Sound | Richard Adams |
| Pelham | Dave Augustyn |
| Pembroke | Ed Jacyno (X) |
| Penetanguishene | Anita Dubeau |
| Perth | John Fenik |
| Perth East | Ian Forrest |
| Petawawa | Bob Sweet (X) |
| Plympton–Wyoming | Lonny Napper (X) |
| Port Colborne | Vance Badawey |
| Port Hope | Linda Thompson |
| Prince Edward | Leo P. Finnegan (X) |
| Puslinch | Brad Whitcombe (X) |
| Ramara | Bill Duffy (X) |
| Renfrew | Sandi Heins (X) |
| Rideau Lakes | Ronald Holman (X) |
| Saugeen Shores | Mike Smith (acc.) |
| Scugog | Marilyn Pearce (X) |
| Severn | Phil Sled (X) (acc.) |
| Sioux Lookout | Kathy Poling |
| Smith–Ennismore–Lakefield | Ron Millen (X) |
| Smiths Falls | Dennis Staples (X) |
| South Bruce | Bill Goetz |
| South Bruce Peninsula | Gwen Gilbert |
| South Dundas | Charles A. Barkley |
| South Frontenac | Gary Davison |
| Southgate | Don Lewis (X) |
| South Glengarry | Jim McDonell (X) (acc.) |
| South Huron | Ken Oke |
| South Stormont | Bryan McGillis |
| Southwest Middlesex | Doug Reycraft (X) |
| South-West Oxford | James Hayes (X) |
| Springwater | Tony Guergis |
| St. Clair | Steve Arnold (X) |
| St. Marys | Jamie Hahn] |
| Stone Mills | Debbie Thompson |
| Strathroy-Caradoc | Mel Veale (X) |
| Tay | Scott Warnock |
| Tay Valley | Keith Kerr (X) |
| Temiskaming Shores | Judy Pace |
| Thames Centre | Jim Maudsley |
| The Blue Mountains | Ellen Anderson (X) |
| Thorold | Henry D'Angela |
| Tillsonburg | Stephen Molnar (X) |
| Tiny | Peggy Breckenridge |
| Trent Hills | Hector MacMillan (X) |
| Tweed | Jo-Anne Albert |
| Uxbridge | Robert Shepherd |
| Wainfleet | Barbara Henderson |
| Wasaga Beach | Cal Patterson (X) |
| Wellesley | Ross Kelterborn (X) |
| Wellington North | Mike Broomhead (X) (acc.) |
| West Elgin | Graham Warwick (X) (acc.) |
| West Grey | Kevin Eccles |
| West Lincoln | Katie Trombetta (X) |
| West Nipissing | Joanne Savage (X) |
| West Perth | John Van Bakel (X) (acc.) |
| Whitchurch–Stouffville | Wayne Emmerson |
| Whitewater Region | Donald Rathwell (X) (acc.) |
| Wilmot | Wayne Roth (X) (acc.) |
| Woolwich | William Strauss (X) (acc.) |
| Zorra | Margaret Lupton |

== The Municipalities of Prescott and Russell ==
(Elected mayors shown only)

| Municipality | Elected |
|---|---|
| Alfred and Plantagenet | Jean-Yves Lalonde (X) (acc.) |
| Casselman | Conrad Lamadeleine |
| Champlain | Gary Barton (X) (acc.) |
| Clarence-Rockland | Richard Lalonde (X) |
| East Hawkesbury | Robert Kirby |
| Hawkesbury | Jeanne Charlebois |
| Russell | Ken Hill |
| The Nation Municipality | Denis Pommainville (X) (acc.) |

== See also ==
- Municipal elections in Canada
- 2003 Ontario municipal elections
- Electronic voting in Canada
