= 2010 Guelph municipal election =

← 2006	October 25, 2010	2014 →
- Turnout: 33.91%
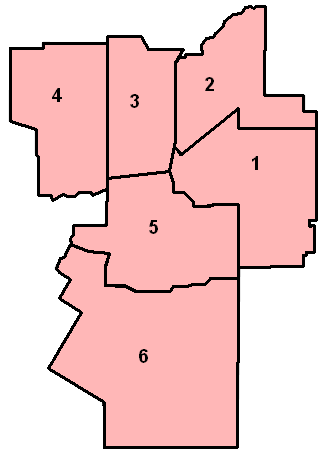
- Map of Guelph's Wards

The 2010 Guelph municipal election were held on October 25, 2010 in Guelph, Ontario, Canada, to elect the Mayor of Guelph, Guelph City Council and the Guelph members of the Upper Grand District School Board (Public) and Wellington Catholic District School Board. The election was held in conjunction with the provincewide 2010 municipal elections.

== Election results ==
Names in bold denotes elected candidates.
(X) denotes incumbent.

=== Mayor ===
One candidate to be elected.

2010 Guelph municipal election: Mayor
Candidate	Votes	%	Δ%	Expenditures (Note: includes expenses not subject to spending limit)
**Karen Farbridge** (X)	14,902	54.11	+3.15	$63,741.54
David Birtwistle	10,576	38.41	–	$25,607.71
Ray Mitchell	1,182	4.29	–	$4.00
Scott Nightingale	878	3.19	–	$200.00
Total valid votes/Expense Limit	27,538	100.0		$82,168.25
Turnout	28,072	33.91		
Eligible voters	82,794			
Source: 2010 Final Official Results, City of Guelph

=== Councillors ===
Two candidates per ward to be elected.

==== Ward 1 ====
Candidate	Votes	%
**Bob Bell** (X)	1,759	20.05
**Jim Furfaro**	1,696	19.34
Sean Farrelly	1,175	13.39
Karolyne Pickett	1,109	12.46
Russell Ott	779	8.88
Gary Walton	601	6.85
Linda Murphy	527	6.00
Peter Bortolon	361	4.11
Tamara Williams	306	3.48
Allan Boynton	235	2.67
Eugene Gromczynski	221	2.52

==== Ward 2 ====
Candidate	Votes	%
**Andy Van Hellemond**	2,538	29.06
**Ian Findlay** (X)	2,180	24.96
Ray Ferraro	1,853	21.22
Vicki Beard (X)	1,757	20.12
Paul Mahony	403	4.61

==== Ward 3 ====
Candidate	Votes	%
**Maggie Laidlaw** (X)	2,296	29.45
**June Hofland** (X)	2,202	28.24
Craig Chamberlain	1,680	21.55
Mark Enchin	799	10.25
Jim Galatianos	498	6.38
Missy Tolton	320	4.10

==== Ward 4 ====
Candidate	Votes	%
**Cam Guthrie**	2,381	31.91
**Gloria Kovach** (X)	1,979	26.52
Christina Boumis	1,694	22.70
Mike Salisbury (X)	1,199	16.07
Steven Petric	207	2.77

==== Ward 5 ====
Candidate	Votes	%
**Leanne Piper** (X)	3,451	39.60
**Lise Burcher** (X)	2,932	33.64
Douglas O'Doherty	2,331	26.75

==== Ward 6 ====
Candidate	Votes	%
**Karl Wettstein** (X)	2,719	37.22
**Todd Dennis**	2,654	36.33
Susan Ricketts	1,932	26.44

== Upper Grand District School Board ==
=== Wards 1 & 5 ===
Two candidates to be elected.

Candidate	Votes	%
Mark Bailey (X)	4,027	38.56
Linda Busuttil (X)	3,151	30.17
John Carpenter	1,742	16.68
Juanita Burnett	1,523	14.58

=== Wards 2,3 & 4 ===
Two candidates to be elected.

Candidate	Votes	%
Jennifer Waterston (X)	5,358	38.55
Susan Moziar (X)	4,596	33.78
Don Griffin	3,844	27.66

=== Ward 6 and Puslinch ===
One candidate to be elected.

Candidate	Votes	%
Marty Fairbairn (X)	1,704	62.64
James McClure	1,016	37.35

== Wellington Catholic District School Board ==
Four candidates to be elected.

Candidate	Votes	%
Marino Gazzola (X)	4,173	25.64
Victoria Dupuis (Sorbara) (X)	3,172	19.49
Sebastian Dal Bo	2,796	17.18
Nan Anderson	2,726	16.75
Susan Dickert	1,986	12.20
Michael Ayotte	1,421	8.73

== Conseil Scolaire Public de District du Centre-Sud Ouest ==
One candidate to be elected, representing Waterloo Region, Middlesex County, Wellington County, Perth County and Huron County.

Candidate	Votes	%
Denis Trudel	53	51.45
Malika Attou	35	33.98
George LeMac	15	14.56

== Conseil Scolaire de District Catholiques Centre-Sud ==
One candidate to be elected, representing Brampton, Caledon, Dufferin County and Wellington County.

Candidate	Votes	%
Tammy Knibbs	72	66.05
Tamar Clutterbuck	37	33.94
