= 1997 Guelph municipal election =

| ← 1994 | November 10, 1997 | 2000 → |
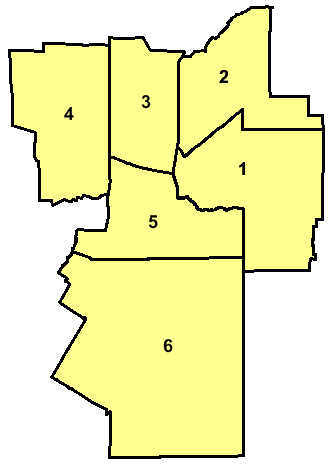
- Map of Guelph's Wards

The 1997 Guelph municipal election was held on November 10, 1997, in Guelph, Ontario, Canada, to elect the Mayor of Guelph, Guelph City Council and the Guelph members of the Upper Grand District School Board (Public) and Wellington Catholic District School Board. The election was one of many races across the province of Ontario.

== Results ==
Names in bold denotes elected candidates.
(X) denotes incumbent.

=== Mayor ===
Mayoral race

| Candidate | Vote | % |
|---|---|---|
| **Joe Young** (X) | **13,193** | **55.08** |
| James M. Sinclair | 6,146 | 25.70 |
| John Pate | 3,684 | 15.39 |
| Michael J. Baldasaro | 481 | 2.03 |
| Beverly Izzillo-Ustation | 448 | 1.87 |

=== Ward 1 ===
Ward 1 Councillor, 2 To Be Elected

| Candidate | Vote | % |
|---|---|---|
| **Karen Farbridge** (X) | **1,830** | **31.55** |
| **Rocco J. Furfaro** | **1,323** | **22.81** |
| John Carrere (X) | 1,243 | 21.43 |
| Dave Ellerson | 588 | 10.13 |
| Frank D'Angelo | 455 | 7.84 |
| Cherry Clayton | 360 | 6.20 |

=== Ward 2 ===
Ward 2 Councillor, 2 To Be Elected

| Candidate | Vote | % |
|---|---|---|
| **Gary Walton** (X) | **2,746** | **36.05** |
| **Sean D Farrelly** (X) | **2,426** | **31.85** |
| John Newstead | 1,209 | 15.87 |
| William Zebedee | 632 | 8.29 |
| Pasquale Vullo | 603 | 7.91 |

=== Ward 3 ===
Ward 3 Councillor, 2 To Be Elected

| Candidate | Vote | % |
|---|---|---|
| **Norm Jary** (X) | **2,713** | **38.94** |
| **Dan Schnurr** (X) | **1,710** | **24.54** |
| Maggie Laidlaw | 1,575 | 22.60 |
| Rita Boulding | 968 | 13.89 |

=== Ward 4 ===
Ward 4 Councillor, 2 To Be Elected

| Candidate | Vote | % |
|---|---|---|
| **Gloria Kovach** (X) | **2,139** | **36.36** |
| **Phil Cumming** | **849** | **14.43** |
| H. Wayne Vokey | 714 | 12.13 |
| Rob McAleer | 604 | 10.26 |
| Stephen McDonald | 485 | 8.24 |
| David Birtwistle | 448 | 7.61 |
| Ed Cuncins | 325 | 5.52 |
| Jim Grant | 318 | 5.40 |

=== Ward 5 ===
Ward 5 Councillor, 2 To Be Elected

| Candidate | Vote | % |
|---|---|---|
| **Cathy Downer** (X) | **2,185** | **36.41** |
| **Bill McAdams** (X) | **1,575** | **26.24** |
| Douglas B. O'Doherty | 1,106 | 18.43 |
| Charles Miller | 648 | 10.79 |
| Gordon Angus | 335 | 5.58 |
| Jim Vernon | 152 | 2.53 |

=== Ward 6 ===
Ward 6 Councillor, 2 To Be Elected

| Candidate | Vote | % |
|---|---|---|
| **Lynda Prior** | **1,748** | **22.11** |
| **Christine Billings** | **1,256** | **15.88** |
| Marilyn Shapka | 1,176 | 14.87 |
| Walter Bilanski (X) | 1,116 | 14.11 |
| Tim Gaw | 1,095 | 13.85 |
| Laura Murr | 915 | 11.57 |
| Lance Tyszka | 332 | 4.19 |
| Tracy Rockett | 267 | 3.37 |

NOTE: The election results published in the Guelph Mercury on November 11, 1997, show Lynda Prior with 1,708 votes.

=== Plebiscite ===
Plebiscite on charity gaming clubs

| Are you in favor of charitable gaming clubs in the City of Guelph? | Vote | % |
|---|---|---|
| Yes | 6,182 | 30.11 |
| **No** | **14,347** | **69.89** |
