= 1994 Guelph municipal election =

← 1991	November 14, 1994	1997 →
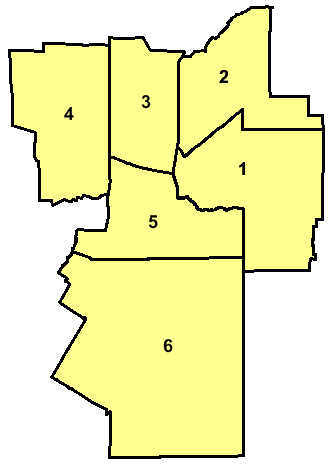
- Map of Guelph's Wards

The 1994 Guelph municipal election was held on November 14, 1994, in Guelph, Ontario, Canada, to elect the Mayor of Guelph, Guelph City Council and the Guelph members of the Upper Grand District School Board (Public) and Wellington Catholic District School Board. The election was one of many races across the province of Ontario.

== Results ==
Names in bold denotes elected candidates.
(X) denotes incumbent.

=== Mayor ===
Mayoral race

Candidate	Vote	%
**Joe Young**	**12,519**	**51.92**
John Counsell (X)	10,026	41.58
Beverly Izzillo-Ustation	673	2.79
Thomas Bradburn	546	2.26
Joseph Dan Cote	350	1.45

=== Ward 1 ===
Ward 1 Councillor, 2 To Be Elected

Candidate	Vote	%
**John Carere** (X)	**1,704**	**30.41**
**Karen Farbridge**	**1,571**	**28.04**
Howard R. Burke	1,267	22.61
Susan Mellor	1,061	18.94

=== Ward 2 ===
Ward 2 Councillor, 2 To Be Elected

Candidate	Vote	%
**Gary Walton**	**1,873**	**23.75**
**Sean Farrelly**	**1,624**	**20.60**
N.P. (Nick) Callwood	1,570	19.91
Dan Moziar	1,538	19.51
Jackie Zimniewich	948	12.02
John Ustation	332	4.21

=== Ward 3 ===
Ward 3 Councillor, 2 To Be Elected

Candidate	Vote	%
**Norm Jary** (X)	**2,968**	**39.74**
**Dan Schnurr**	**1,365**	**18.28**
Phil Allt	1,288	17.25
Theresa Stafford (X)	1,210	16.20
John E. (Jack) Misener	637	8.53

=== Ward 4 ===
Ward 4 Councillor, 2 To Be Elected

Candidate	Vote
**Gloria Kovach** (X)	**Acclaimed**
**Jim Sinclair** (X)	**Acclaimed**

=== Ward 5 ===
Ward 5 Councillor, 2 To Be Elected

Candidate	Vote	%
**Cathy Downer**	**2,076**	**28.83**
**Bill McAdams** (X)	**1,538**	**21.36**
Dennis Brazolot	1,287	17.87
Marty Williams	879	12.20
Donald F. Zuccala	712	9.89
Rita Boulding	710	9.86

=== Ward 6 ===
Ward 6 Councillor, 2 To Be Elected

Candidate	Vote	%
**John H. Pate** (X)	**1,712**	**25.33**
**Walter Bilanski** (X)	**1,521**	**22.50**
Tim Gaw	1,451	21.46
Marilyn J. Shapka	1,212	17.93
Andrew Oosterhoff	864	12.78
