= 1991 Guelph municipal election =

← 1988	November 12, 1991	1994 →
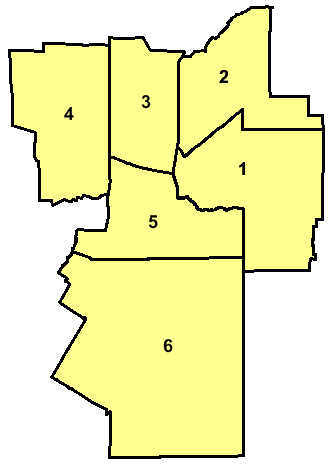
- Map of Guelph's Wards

The 1991 Guelph municipal election was held on November 12, 1991, in Guelph, Ontario, Canada, to elect the Mayor of Guelph, Guelph City Council and the Guelph members of the Upper Grand District School Board (Public) and Wellington Catholic District School Board. The election was one of many races across the province of Ontario.

It was also the first since 1930 to use wards to elect members of city council rather a citywide vote. Two councillors were to be elected in each of the six new wards.

== Results ==
Names in bold denotes elected candidates.
(X) denotes incumbent.

=== Mayor ===
Mayoral race

Candidate	Vote	%
**John Counsell** (X)	**11,952**	**57.55**
Peter Meisenheimer	6,267	30.18
John Millington	2,548	12.27

=== Ward 1 ===
Ward 1 Councillor, 2 To Be Elected

Candidate	Vote	%
**Joe Young** (X)	**1,865**	**34.64**
**John Carere**	**981**	**18.22**
Betty Stone (X)	775	14.39
Bill Hulet	717	13.32
Howard Burke	707	13.13
Nicole Seguin	339	6.30

=== Ward 2 ===
Ward 2 Councillor, 2 To Be Elected

Candidate	Vote	%
**Frank Maine**	**2,329**	**28.34**
**Linda Lennon** (X)	**2,126**	**25.87**
Gary Walton	1,400	17.04
Karen Farbridge	955	11.62
John Ustation	669	8.14
Lew Edwards	490	5.96
Louis Szpeflicki	249	3.03

=== Ward 3 ===
Ward 3 Councillor, 2 To Be Elected

Candidate	Vote	%
**Norm Jary** (X)	**2,588**	**37.10**
**Theresa Stafford**	**1,343**	**19.25**
David Kendrick (X)	1,019	14.61
John (Jack) Misener	707	10.13
Edward Pickersgill	552	7.91
Al Krusky, Jr.	339	4.86
Peter Kelley	271	3.88
Ray Mitchell	157	2.25

=== Ward 4 ===
Ward 4 Councillor, 2 To Be Elected

Candidate	Vote	%
**Gloria Kovach**	**1,157**	**26.54**
**James Sinclair**	**908**	**20.83**
Philip N. Allt	758	17.39
Alan Smart	669	15.35
Robert Warner	459	10.53
Doug Roach	408	9.36

=== Ward 5 ===
Ward 5 Councillor, 2 To Be Elected

Candidate	Vote	%
**Carl Hamilton** (X)	**1,623**	**25.70**
**Bill McAdams**	**1,456**	**23.06**
Clara Marett (X)	1,306	20.68
Tim Mau	770	12.19
Marty Williams	671	10.63
Beverly Ann Izzillo	489	7.74

=== Ward 6 ===
Ward 6 Councillor, 2 To Be Elected

Candidate	Vote	%
**John Pate**	**1,481**	**27.43**
**Walter K. Bilanski** (X)	**1,173**	**21.73**
Tim Gaw	1,133	20.99
Donald Peacock (X)	856	15.85
Andrew Oosterhoff	756	14.00
