= 2006 Guelph municipal election =

← 2003	November 13, 2006	2010 →
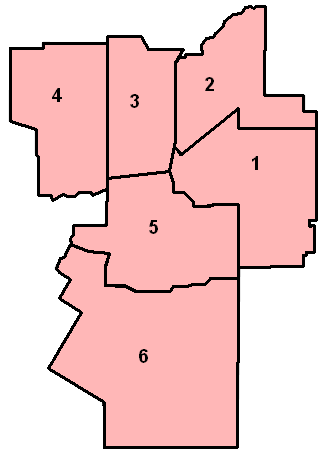
- Map of Guelph's Wards

The 2006 Guelph municipal election was held on November 13, 2006, in Guelph, Ontario, Canada, to elect the Mayor of Guelph, Guelph City Council and the Guelph members of the Upper Grand District School Board (Public) and Wellington Catholic District School Board. The election was one of many races across the province of Ontario.

== Election results ==
Names in bold denotes elected candidates.
(X) denotes incumbent.

=== Mayor ===
One candidate to be elected.

Candidate	Votes	%
**Karen Farbridge**	17,689	50.96
Kate Quarrie (X)	12,319	35.49
Mark Briestensky	4,180	12.04
Bev A. Izzillo-Ustation	523	1.51

=== Councillors ===
Two candidates per ward to be elected.

==== Ward 1 ====
Candidate	Votes	%
**Bob Bell**	3,212	32.32
**Laura Baily** (X)	1,717 *	17.28
Kathleen Farrelly	1,717 *	17.28
Rocco J. Furfaro (X)	1,647	16.57
John Allan	1,329	13.37
Eugene Gromczynski	316	3.18

- The Ward 1 tie between Laura Baily and Kathleen Farrelly was broken under the Municipal Elections Act with the City Clerk drawing Baily's name randomly by lot.

==== Ward 2 ====
Candidate	Votes	%
**Vicki Beard**	2,404	22.67
**Ian Findlay**	2,330	21.97
Gary Walton	1,815	17.12
Ray Ferraro (X)	1,671	15.76
Dan Moziar (X)	1,522	14.35
Andrew Colwill	771	7.27
Matthew Knock	90	0.85

==== Ward 3 ====
Candidate	Votes	%
**Maggie Laidlaw** (X)	3,213	30.22
**June Hofland**	3,083	29.00
Dan Schnurr (X)	1,607	15.11
Craig Chamberlain	1,508	14.18
Charlie Whittaker	1,221	11.48

==== Ward 4 ====
Candidate	Votes	%
**Gloria Kovach** (X)	2,623	34.19
**Mike Salisbury**	1,999	26.06
Cam Guthrie	1,805	23.53
David Birtwistle (X)	1,244	16.22

==== Ward 5 ====
Candidate	Votes	%
**Leanne Piper**	4,339	36.88
**Lise Burcher** (X)	4,053	34.45
Sal De Monte	1,613	13.71
Dan Douma	962	8.18
John Alves	797	6.77

==== Ward 6 ====
Candidate	Votes	%
**Karl Wettstein**	2,537	27.42
**Christine Billings** (X)	2,438	26.35
Ken Morgan	2,423	26.19
Peter Hamtak (X)	1,555	16.81
William McAdams	300	3.24

== Upper Grand District School Board ==
=== Wards 1, 5 and 6 ===
Two candidates to be elected.

Candidate	Votes	%
Mark Bailey	5,681	32.76
Linda Busuttil	3,666	21.14
Marty Fairbairn (X)	3,201	18.46
Randy Norris	2,706	15.61
Helen Teece	2,085	12.02

=== Wards 2, 3 and 4 ===
Two candidates to be elected.

Candidate	Votes	%
Jennifer Waterston (X)	5,366	32.39
Susan Moziar (X)	4,341	26.20
Andrea Robinson	3,565	21.52
Don Griffin	3,297	19.90

== Wellington Catholic District School Board ==
Four candidates to be elected.

Candidate	Votes	%
Dennis J. Noon (X)	4,343	21.90
Jim Furfaro	3,883	19.58
Marino L. Gazzola (X)	3,780	1906
Victoria (Sorbara) Dupuis (X)	3,085	15.55
Richard A. Gazzola (X)	3,078	15.52
David G. Bryden	1,666	8.4

== Conseil Scolaire Public de District du Centre-Sud Ouest ==
One candidate to be elected, representing Waterloo Region, Middlesex County, Wellington County, Perth County and Huron County.

Candidate	Votes	%
Gilles Arpin (X)	71	67.41
Stephan Barath	44	32/59

== Conseil Scolaire de District Catholiques Centre-Sud ==
1 Candidate to be elected, representing the Region of Waterloo, and the Counties of Wellington, Brant, Haldimand and Norfolk

Candidate	Votes	%
Dorothée Petit-Pas (X)	Acclaimed	100

== Ward Referendum ==
"Are you in favour of retaining the ward system as the current method of electing city councillors?"
Response	Votes	%
Yes	26,741	83.2
No	5,390	16.8

== Timeline ==
- September 29, 2006 - Nominations close.
- November 13, 2006 - Election Day.

== Issues ==
Professionalism on City Council

Wet/Dry Recycling

Heritage Protection

Growth Management

== See also ==
2006 Ontario municipal elections
