= Guelph Memorial Gardens =

Coordinates: 43.5435°N 80.2485°W

The Guelph Memorial Gardens was an arena located in Guelph, Ontario. It was originally built in 1948 out of the remnants of a nineteenth-century building that had housed the Royal Winter Fair. The Gardens hosted various hockey teams over the years, including the Guelph Biltmores, Guelph Platers and Guelph Storm. The arena has 3,999 seats and around 300 standing room only spots.

The last hockey game played at the arena was March 24, 2000 and the building closed permanently in November 2001 with the opening of the Sleeman Centre.

Demolition of the arena commenced in December 2005. The City of Guelph built a new city hall on the site, which is next door to the former city hall.
