= 2003 Guelph municipal election =

Municipal election in Canada

← 2000	November 10, 2003	2006 →
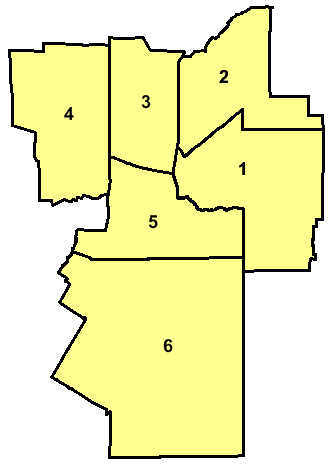
- Map of Guelph's Wards

The 2003 Guelph municipal election was held on November 10, 2003, in Guelph, Ontario, Canada, to elect the Mayor of Guelph, Guelph City Council and the Guelph members of the Upper Grand District School Board (Public) and Wellington Catholic District School Board. The election was one of many races across the province of Ontario, but was the only major city in the province where both of the leading candidates for mayor were women.

== Election results ==
Names in bold denotes elected candidates.
(X) denotes incumbent.

=== Mayor ===
One candidate to be elected.

Candidate	Votes	%
**Kate Quarrie**	16,158	53.20
Karen Farbridge (X)	12,291	40.46
Billy Craven	1,156	3.81
Kurt Krausewitz	423	1.39
John Ustation	347	1.14

=== Councillors ===
Two candidates per ward to be elected.

==== Ward 1 ====
Candidate	Votes	%
**Rocco J. Furfaro** (X)	2,255	25.61
**Laura Baily**	1,986	22.56
Robert Bell	1,639	18.61
Joe Young (X)	1,567	17.80
Alan Pickersgill	1,260	14.31
Harry G. Barnes	98	1.11

==== Ward 2 ====
Candidate	Votes	%
**Dan Moziar** (X)	2,017	20.53
**Ray Ferraro**	1,885	19.19
Gary Walton	1,685	17.15
Sean Farrelly (X)	1,378	14.03
Marion Baldwin	1,363	13.87
David Sherratt	785	7.99
Nora Black	453	4.61
J. Bruder Meshake	258	2.63

==== Ward 3 ====
Candidate	Votes	%
**Dan Schnurr** (X)	2,130	25.65
**Maggie Laidlaw** (X)	1,833	21.65
Bill Barrett	1,667	19.69
Kim Iezzi	1,491	17.61
Joe Sharpe	932	11.01
Bradley Shaw	245	2.89
Marc Bosboom	169	2.00

==== Ward 4 ====
Candidate	Votes	%
**Gloria Kovach** (X)	2,370	34.14
**David Birtwistle** (X)	1,990	28.66
Don Irvine	1,516	21.83
Mark Briestensky	600	8.64
Steven Petric	467	6.73

==== Ward 5 ====
Candidate	Votes	%
**Cathy Downer** (X)	1,744	25.25
**Lise Burcher**	1,705	24.68
Jim Muir	1,180	17.08
Douglas O'Doherty	1,162	16.82
Bill McAdams (X)	836	12.10
Ann Clayton	281	4.07

==== Ward 6 ====
Candidate	Votes	%
**Peter Hamtak**	2,405	19.68
**Christine Billings**	2,332	19.08
Karl Wettstein (X)	2,239	18.32
Angelo Mior	2,091	17.11
Marilyn Shapka (X)	1,719	14.06
Malcolm Chumley	851	6.96
Mirza Baig	586	4.79

== Timeline ==
- September 22, 2003 - Nominations close.
- November 10, 2003 - Election Day.

== Issues ==
- Wal-Mart at 6 & 7
- Subbor breach of contract

== See also ==
2003 Ontario municipal elections
