= 2022 Guelph municipal election =

Canadian municipal election

- October 24, 2022
- Turnout: 27.96%
Nominee	Cam Guthrie	Danny Drew	William Albabish
Popular vote	20,357	3,659	2,199
Percentage	71.21%	12.80%	7.69%
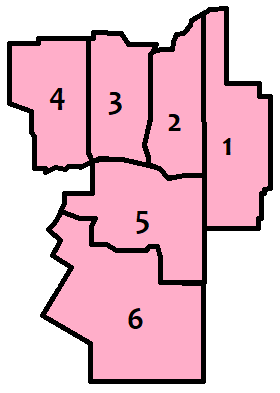
- Map of Guelph's 6 wards
Mayor before election
Cam Guthrie
Elected mayor
Cam Guthrie

The 2022 Guelph municipal election was held on October 24, 2022, to elect the Mayor of Guelph, Guelph City Council and the Upper Grand District School Board, Wellington Catholic District School Board, Conseil scolaire catholique MonAvenir and Conseil scolaire Viamonde. The election will be held on the same day as elections in every other municipality in Ontario.

In 2021, the city held a ward boundary review, altering the boundaries of its six wards to be used for the 2022 election.

In total, prior to the August 19th deadline, six candidates had registered to run for mayor and 40 for the twelve council seats. Official vote counts were released by the city clerk's office within days of the election.

== Mayor ==
Guelph mayor Cam Guthrie announced he was running for re-election on May 3, 2022.

Mayoral Candidate	Vote	%
Cam Guthrie (X)	20,357	71.21
Danny Drew	3,659	12.80
William Albabish	2,199	7.69
Shelagh McFarlane	1,119	3.91
John Edward Krusky	949	3.32
Nicholas A. Ross	303	1.06

== City Council ==
Each ward elects two councillors. Voters may vote for two candidates in each ward.

=== Ward 1 ===
Council Candidate	Vote	%
Dan Gibson (X)	2,375	31.11
Erin Caton	1,418	18.58
Thai Mac	1,247	16.34
Michelle F. Bowman	1,229	16.10
Dhruv Shah	783	10.26
Chidi Nwene	581	7.61

=== Ward 2 ===
Council Candidate	Vote	%
Rodrigo Goller (X)	3,498	30.66
Carly Klassen	3,105	27.21
Rob Osburn	1,146	10.04
Raymond Sartor	1,090	9.55
Ray Ferraro	1,081	9.47
Elia Morrison	757	6.63
Morgan Dandie	564	4.94
Billy Cottrell	169	1.48

=== Ward 3 ===
Council Candidate	Vote	%
Phil Allt (X)	3,228	39.24
Michelle Richardson	1,362	16.56
Kevin Bowman	1,297	15.77
Luc Cousineau	881	10.71
John Bertrand	819	9.96
Dallas Green	290	3.53
Sam Elmslie	189	2.30
Nathan Ford	160	1.95

=== Ward 4 ===
Council Candidate	Vote	%
Christine Billings (X)	2,202	30.04
Linda Busuttil	1,685	22.99
Brendan Clark	1,414	19.29
Adrian Salvatore	991	13.52
Hitesh Jagad	708	9.66
Justin Van Daele	221	3.02
Anne-Marie Blackadar	109	1.49

=== Ward 5 ===
Council Candidate	Vote	%
Leanne Caron Piper (X)	2,870	35.09
Cathy Downer (X)	2,809	34.34
Lana Haines	850	10.39
Alex Green	732	8.95
Hesham Genidy	583	7.13
Denese Renaud	335	4.10

=== Ward 6 ===
Council Candidate	Vote	%
Dominique O'Rourke (X)	3,330	36.01
Ken Yee Chew	2,624	28.37
Mark MacKinnon (X)	2,216	23.96
Chetna Robinson	710	7.68
Craig DiSero	368	3.98
