= Sleeman Centre =

Sporting and entertainment facility located in Guelph, Ontario

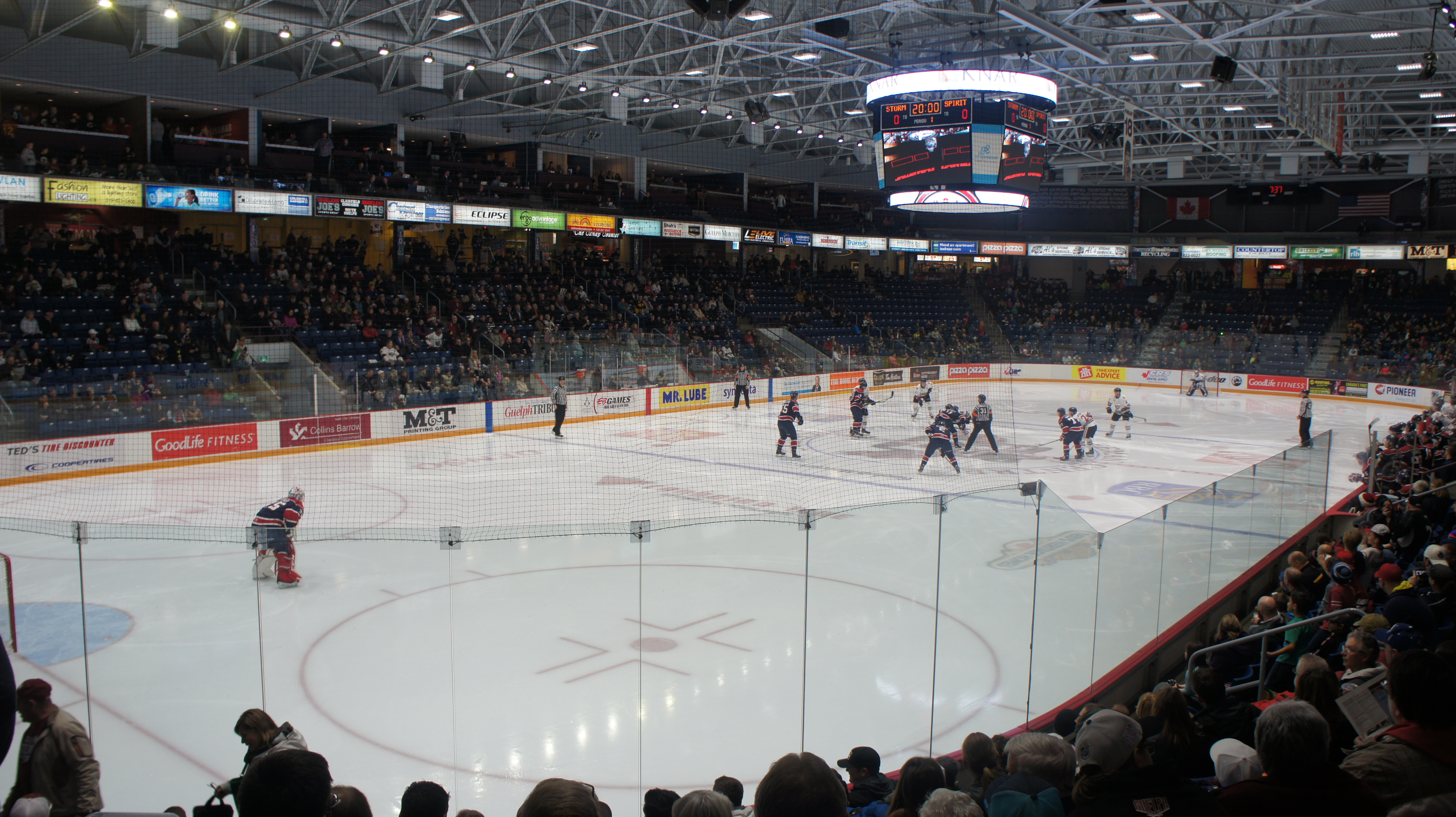

- Location within Ontario Location within Canada
- Former names: Guelph Sports and Entertainment Centre
- Address: 50 Woolwich Street; Guelph, Ontario; N1H 3T9
- Coordinates: 43°32′48″N 80°14′47″W
- Owner: City of Guelph
- Operator: City of Guelph
- Capacity: Hockey: 4,715; Concerts 6,500

Construction
- Groundbreaking: November 1998
- Opened: October 6, 2000
- Cost: CA$21 million ($36.1 million in 2025 dollars)
- Architects: PBK Architects, Inc.
- Services engineer: Integrated Engineering
- General contractor: Ball Construction

Tenants
- Guelph Storm (OHL) (2000–present); Guelph Hurricanes (GOJHL) (2009–2018); Guelph Nighthawks (CEBL) (2019–2022)

The Sleeman Centre (formerly the Guelph Sports and Entertainment Centre) is a 4,715 seat multi-purpose facility in Guelph, Ontario, Canada. The Sleeman Centre has hosted concerts, sporting and family events as well as trade shows and conferences. It is home to the Guelph Storm of the major junior Ontario Hockey League. The arena hosted the 2002 Memorial Cup and the 2008 Founders Cup tournament.

== History ==
The Guelph Sports and Entertainment Centre was built in 2000 at a cost of CA$21 million. A new arena for Guelph had been in discussion for well over a decade by Guelph City Council. The owners of the Guelph Platers, the OHL team at Guelph Memorial Gardens at the time, moved to Owen Sound in 1989 with one of the stated reasons being the lack of a new arena. Serious talks of a new arena for the Guelph Storm, which moved from Hamilton, Ontario in 1991 and played out of the cramped Guelph Memorial Gardens, did not get started until the mid to late 1990s after the Guelph Storm's failed attempt to host the Memorial Cup.

Finding a suitable location, as well as the cost, was debated for many years. Many sites had been looked at including the Memorial Gardens site, the Fountain Street parking lot, and in the west end of the city where there was plans to build a new recreation and community complex. When the Eaton's store at the Guelph Eaton Centre closed down, the city investigated the potential of building an arena where the now empty store stood. To acquire the property, the city had to purchase the mall from ING Barings for CA$1.7 million. The 5,000-seat arena was then built on the site of the former Eaton's store after the purchase of the mall in 1998 and demolition of the back section where the Eaton's store once stood.

The city entered a public–private partnership agreement with Nustadia in 1998 to build and operate the Guelph Sports and Entertainment Centre for 30 years. The city contributed half of the cost of the project and also guaranteed a CA$9 million loan for capital costs, which was to be paid back by Nustadia. However, in 2001, the city of Guelph had to take over the CA$10 million "senior" loan for the Guelph Sports and Entertainment Centre, plus the CA$9.5 million "subordinated" loan the city was already paying due to Nustadia failing to make a June 1 quarterly payment of $181,250. The city had to pay CA$3 million over the a four-year span to make Nustadia's payments on its bank loan for the downtown arena. Nustadia stated that difficulties in making payments were attributed to a number of factors, including the failure to generate anticipated restaurant and food court revenue and lower-than-projected ticket sales from Guelph Storm hockey games. Nustadia expected 3,500 people per game but the average was closer to 2,800 in 2000–01. A four-year reprieve was granted by Guelph City Council so that Nustadia could operate under ideal conditions. Nustadia was to repay the money but with a clause in the agreement between the city and the developer giving either side the ability to walk away with no financial obligations to the other. That deal expired on June 30, 2005.

In 2005, after the four-year reprieve, the city took over ownership of the Guelph Sports and Entertainment Centre because Nustadia Developments Inc. decided to walk away from the downtown facility, completing a controversial transaction that had been expected for a few months. The deal at the time transferred the ownership from Guelph Centre Partners, a division of Nustadia that was managing the arena, to the city, and left the City of Guelph with nearly CA$4 million in unanticipated debt plus the $9-million loan previously guaranteed by the city. In 2009, the City of Guelph announced plans to upgrade the Sleeman Centre starting spring 2010. This upgrade consisted of adding a video score clock to the arena that has four video replay screens as well as two LED rings at the top and bottom of the scoreboard.

From 2009 to 2018, Guelph's junior B team, the Guelph Hurricanes (formerly known as the Guelph Dominators) moved to the Sleeman Centre for their regular season home games. The team moved back to Cambridge, Ontario, as the Cambridge Redhawks in 2018.

After the end of the 2024–25 season, the Sleeman Centre was used as the filming location for Heated Rivalry's on-ice scenes. The rink was used by the series as the home ice for three fictional professional hockey teams.

== Renovations and Hosting ==
In November 2025, the Canadian Hockey League selected the Guelph Storm and the Sleeman Centre to host the 2027 Memorial Cup, aligning with the City of Guelph's bicentennial celebrations. Ahead of the tournament, the facility underwent a multi-year, $3 million overhaul funded entirely by the Guelph Storm without taxpayer contribution.

Upgrades included a $750,000 high-definition scoreboard—roughly four times larger and clearer than the 2012 model it replaced—a dynamic LED logo panel embedded at center ice, dressing room expansions, and concourse modernizations. Additionally, structural modifications converted underutilized concrete steps into a new bar and lounge area, adding standing room and 128 seats.

In parallel with the renovations, Guelph City Council shifted the arena's strategic focus toward major entertainment and commercial events, eliminating youth ice time to reduce operational tax dependence and prepare for hosting major events.

== Sleeman sponsorship ==
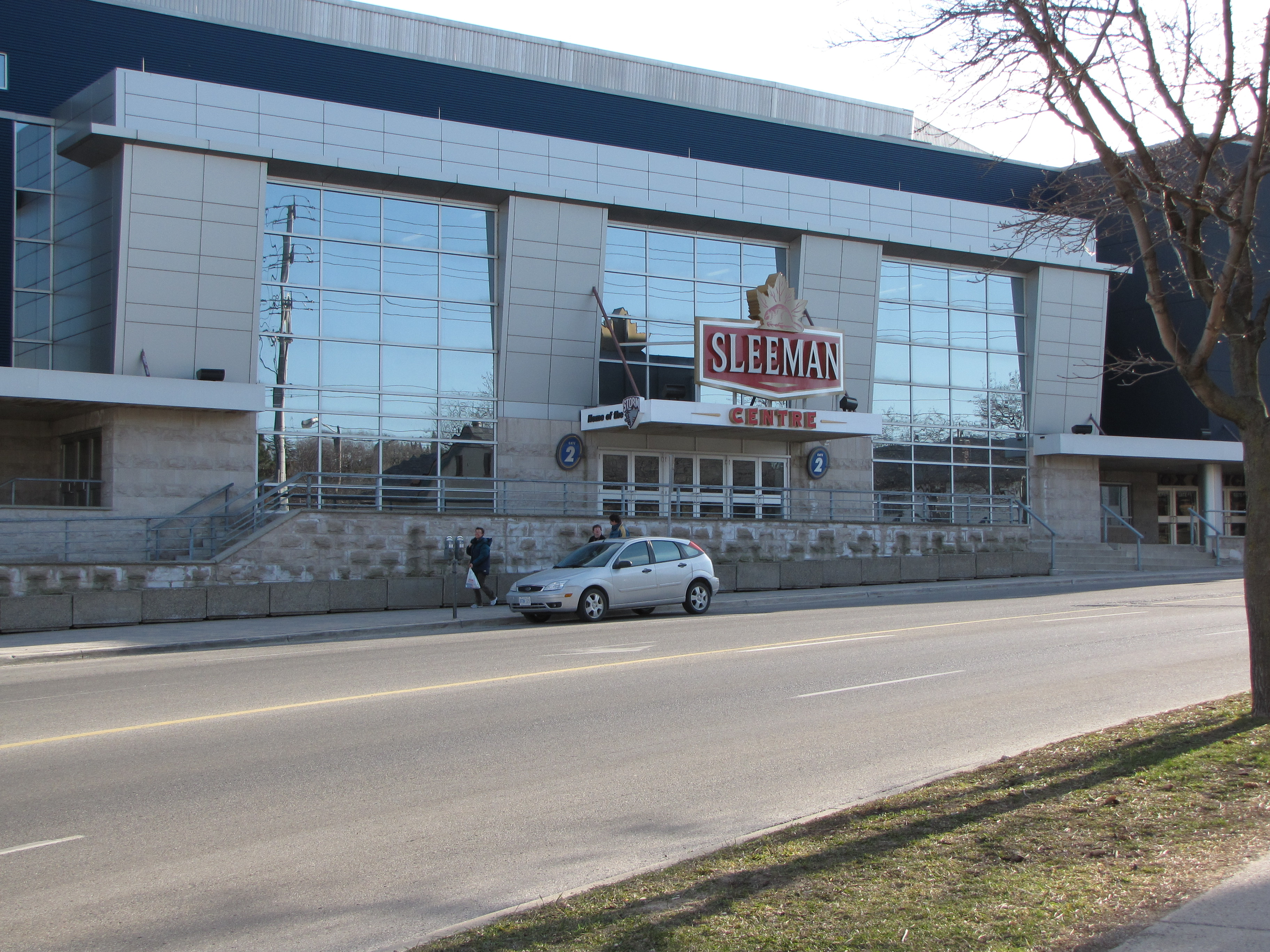
Exterior of the Sleeman Centre as seen from Woolwich St.

In June 2007, Sleeman Breweries and the City of Guelph finalized a $1.2 million sponsorship deal that gives the beer company exclusive naming rights to the Guelph Sports & Entertainment Centre until 2020. In 2021, it was announced that deal was renewed through to June 30, 2030, for $1 million.

== Layout ==
In the main arena the seats are blue, with private suites located one level above the main seating area. The club seats are behind the player benches. There is also a restaurant behind the club seats as well as a 200 level VIP section on the same level of the private boxes. The arena has a standard four-sided scoreboard, which is blue to go with the arena theme colour. The concourse is wide and horseshoe shaped, as fans have to either exit to Old Quebec Street food court or go through the restaurant. Fans can walk all the way around the arena with uninterrupted views of the action on the ice.
