= 2000 Guelph municipal election =

| ← 1997 | November 13, 2000 | 2003 → |
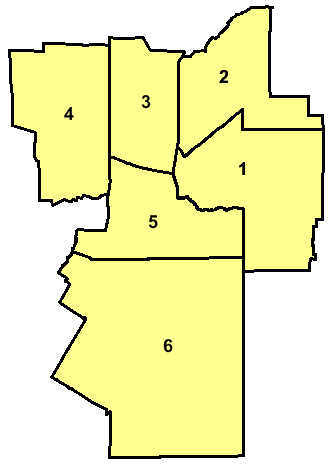
- Map of Guelph's Wards

The 2000 Guelph municipal election was held on November 13, 2000., in Guelph, Ontario, Canada, to elect the Mayor of Guelph, Guelph City Council and the Guelph members of the Upper Grand District School Board (Public) and Wellington Catholic District School Board. The election was one of many races across the province of Ontario.

== Results ==
Names in bold denotes elected candidates.
(X) denotes incumbent.

=== Mayor ===
Mayoral race

| Candidate | Vote | % |
|---|---|---|
| **Karen Farbridge** | **12,596** | **40.78** |
| Dave Kendrick | 9,563 | 30.96 |
| Phil Cumming | 4,431 | 14.35 |
| Gary Walton | 2,180 | 7.06 |
| James. M Sinclair | 1,872 | 6.06 |
| Michael Klotz | 244 | 0.79 |

=== Ward 1 ===
Ward 1 Councillor, 2 To Be Elected

| Candidate | Vote | % |
|---|---|---|
| **Joe Young** | **1,867** | **21.92** |
| **Rocco J. Furfaro** (X) | **1,417** | **16.64** |
| Laura Baily | 1,405 | 16.50 |
| Ian Findlay | 1,392 | 16.34 |
| Angie Gazzola | 1,316 | 15.45 |
| Jonathan Dynes | 676 | 7.94 |
| Frank D'Angelo | 444 | 5.21 |

=== Ward 2 ===
Ward 2 Councillor, 2 To Be Elected

| Candidate | Vote | % |
|---|---|---|
| **Sean D Farrelly** (X) | **2,618** | **26.74** |
| **Dan Moziar** | **2,198** | **22.45** |
| Dino Roumel | 1,656 | 16.91 |
| John Newstead | 1,454 | 14.85 |
| David G. Bryden | 922 | 9.42 |
| Bev Izoillo-Ustation | 529 | 5.40 |
| Peter Linke | 414 | 4.23 |

=== Ward 3 ===
Ward 3 Councillor, 2 To Be Elected

| Candidate | Vote | % |
|---|---|---|
| **Maggie Laidlaw** | **2,438** | **27.65** |
| **Dan Schnurr** (X) | **2,069** | **23.47** |
| Jim Whitechurch | 2,042 | 23.16 |
| Kim Iezzi | 1740 | 19.74 |
| Douglas J Birnie | 527 | 5.98 |

=== Ward 4 ===
Ward 4 Councillor, 2 To Be Elected

| Candidate | Vote | % |
|---|---|---|
| **Gloria Kovach** (X) | **2,814** | **38.15** |
| **David Birtwistle** | **1,953** | **26.48** |
| Stephen McDonald | 1,237 | 16.77 |
| Doug Roach | 980 | 13.29 |
| Steven Petric | 392 | 5.31 |

=== Ward 5 ===
Ward 5 Councillor, 2 To Be Elected

| Candidate | Vote | % |
|---|---|---|
| **Cathy Downer** (X) | **2,765** | **30.60** |
| **Bill McAdams** (X) | **1,695** | **22.44** |
| Jim Muir | 1,607 | 21.27 |
| Malcolm Chumbley | 771 | 10.21 |
| Josh Shook | 717 | 9.49 |

=== Ward 6 ===
Ward 6 Councillor, 2 To Be Elected

| Candidate | Vote | % |
|---|---|---|
| **Marilyn Shapka** | **3,168** | **29.25** |
| **Karl Wettstein** | **2,645** | **24.42** |
| Lyle McNair | 2,072 | 19.13 |
| Walter Bilanski | 1,739 | 16.06 |
| Dave Thompson | 1,207 | 11.14 |
