= George Herod =

Canadian politician (1827–1899)

Doctor George Samuel Herod (May 26, 1827 – January 25, 1899) was an English-born physician and politician. He served as mayor of Guelph from 1869 to 1870.

He was born in Lancashire and was educated in Mansfield and Birmingham. Herod came to Guelph in 1840. He studied medicine with two physicians there and then continued his studies at King's College, Toronto and was admitted to practice in 1847. He became a physician at the Emigrant Hospital in Hamilton and set up practice in Georgetown a year later. In 1854, Herod returned to Guelph and entered practice with Dr. William Clarke. Herod served as county coroner, as surgeon for the jail and as surgeon for the county militia. He was also a member of the town council and of the local school board.

Herod married Margaret Sandiland.

He died in Guelph.
