= Karen Farbridge =

Canadian politician

Her Worship Karen Farbridge

58th Mayor of Guelph
- In office 2000–2003
- Preceded by: Joe Young
- Succeeded by: Kate Quarrie
- In office 2006–2014
- Preceded by: Kate Quarrie
- Succeeded by: Cam Guthrie

Personal details
- Born: Woking, England
- Parent(s): Joseph Farbridge and Joan Farbridge (Martin)
- Website: http://www.karenfarbridge.ca/

Karen J. Farbridge is a Canadian politician, the former Mayor and a former City Councillor of the city of Guelph, Ontario.

== Personal life ==
Farbridge was born in Woking, England the oldest of three siblings. When she was three years old, she moved to Canada with her family for her father's work. Her father, Joseph Farbridge, was an aeronautical engineer who moved to Canada to work with de Havilland Aircraft of Canada Ltd.

A resident of Guelph since 1979, Farbridge has an MSc and PhD in zoology from the University of Guelph.

== Early career ==
Karen Farbridge worked for the Ontario Public Interest Research Group in Guelph for 10 years prior to being elected as Mayor of Guelph in 2000.

== Career in politics ==
Farbridge was first elected to Guelph City Council in 1994 and served until her first election as mayor in the 2000 municipal election. She served until 2003, when she was defeated by Kate Quarrie in the 2003 municipal election, but defeated Quarrie in the 2006 municipal election. Reelected in the 2010 municipal election, she was defeated by Cam Guthrie in the 2014 municipal election. During her 11-year tenure as mayor, Farbridge became the second longest sitting mayor in Guelph, behind Norm Jary who served 15 years, and the longest sitting female mayor.

During Farbridge’s tenure as mayor, the new Guelph Civic Museum was opened in 2012. The preservation of the former Loretto Convent and construction of the museum was achieved due to the partnership between the City of Guelph, the Province of Ontario, the Federal Government of Canada, the Diocese of Hamilton and community leaders and donors who supported the renovation.

Farbridge and the City of Guelph received numerous awards during her tenure as mayor:

- In 2012, Farbridge was the recipient of the Queen Elizabeth II Diamond Jubilee Medal from the Governor General of Canada for her contributions and achievements to Canada.
- The City of Guelph was awarded the Ron Lance Memorial Award by Waste Diversion Ontario for achieving the highest residential waste diversion rate in Ontario in 2012.
- In 2014, Farbridge was awarded a City Builder Award from the Canadian Urban Institute. The City Builder Award recognizes a leader whose bold vision and ability to implement change represents true city building. Karen was recognized for her leadership in sustainability, community energy and the revitalization of downtown Guelph.
- In 2014, Farbridge also received the Clean50/Clean16 Award from Delta Management Group, which is awarded annually to 50 individual leaders who are advancing clean and sustainable development in Canada.
- Farbridge also led an initiative to improve the wellbeing of Guelph residents during her last term. This work was a partnership between the City of Guelph and the Canadian Index of Wellbeing and was recognized by an Impact Award by the Community Indicators Consortium in 2013.

Farbridge championed community energy planning during her tenure as mayor and Guelph City Council approved the municipality's first 25-year Community Energy Plan in 2007. Guelph City Council endorsed the vision, goals and directions of the plan that would put Guelph on the cutting edge for energy conservation in North America. The Community Energy Plan was developed by a Consortium that included the City of Guelph, Union Gas, Guelph Hydro, business and industry representatives, the University of Guelph, school boards, and Guelph Chamber of Commerce, with the assistance of international energy expert Peter Garforth.

Farbridge received the Chartered Director designation from the Directors College, DeGroote School of Business, McMaster University in 2008.

== Career Post Mayoral Position ==
Shortly after leaving office, Farbridge launched Karen Farbridge & Associates Ltd., a consulting firm that advises public and private sector clients on public policy development and the navigation of the inner workings of government.

Karen Farbridge and Associates Ltd. was a member of the consulting team that supported the development of community energy plans in the Town of Oakville, City of Brampton, and the County of Essex, and a business case for residential retrofits in the Town of Newmarket

In 2015, Farbridge was elected to the Meridian Credit Union Board of Directors. As of 2018, Farbridge is Chair of the Board of Directors for Meridian Credit Union and Motusbank.

As of 2016 Farbridge has been Adjunct Faculty in the Faculty of Environmental and Urban Change at York University.

Karen was co-author of Top Asks for Climate Action: Ramping Up Low Carbon Communities and On the Path to Net-zero Communities: Integrating Land Use and Energy Planning in Ontario Municipalities. This publication highlights how Canada can ramp up climate action by empowering low carbon communities. The study pinpoints the measures local governments need from the federal, provincial and territorial governments to realize climate action and lays out 18 federal policies and 24 provincial/territorial policies for capacity building, funding, buildings, transportation and smart growth.

She worked in partnership with Dr. Kirby Calvert as part of a partnership of Canadian universities, the Community Energy Knowledge Action Partnership (CEKAP) to complete a set of case studies looking at net zero and low carbon developments across five Ontario municipalities to develop key insights into the role that municipalities, the Province, and the development sector can play to enable the development of innovative net zero and low carbon communities in Ontario.

Karen Farbridge launched a podcast in 2020, Promethea Rising, to showcase individuals promoting energy conscious communities in Canada.

== Electoral record ==
2014 Guelph municipal election: Mayor
Candidate	Votes	%	Δ%	Expenditures (Note: includes expenses not subject to spending limit)
Cam Guthrie	19,672	50.75	–	$91,314.72
Karen Farbridge (X)	14,174	36.57	-17.54	$80,263.17
Jason Blokhuis	3,987	10.29	–	$6,766.23
Andrew Donovan	296	0.76	–	$1,074.50
John Legere	269	0.69	–	$7,204.24
Joseph St. Denis	250	0.64	–	$6,192.70
Nicholas A. Ross	112	0.29	–	none listed
Total valid votes/expense limit	38,760	100.0		$82,168.25
Turnout	38,873	43.21		
Eligible voters	89,968			
Sources: 2014 Official Election Results, City of Guelph, 2014 Election - Mayor, City of Guelph, and Voter Statistics, City of Guelph

2010 Guelph municipal election: Mayor
Candidate	Votes	%	Δ%	Expenditures (Note: includes expenses not subject to spending limit)
Karen Farbridge (X)	14,902	54.11	+3.15	$63,741.54
David Birtwistle	10,576	38.41	–	$25,607.71
Ray Mitchell	1,182	4.29	–	$4.00
Scott Nightingale	878	3.19	–	$200.00
Total valid votes/expense limit	27,538	100.0		$82,168.25
Turnout	28,072	33.91		
Eligible voters	82,794			
Source: 2010 Final Official Results, City of Guelph
