= Dominique O'Rourke =

Canadian politician

Dominique O'Rourke MP
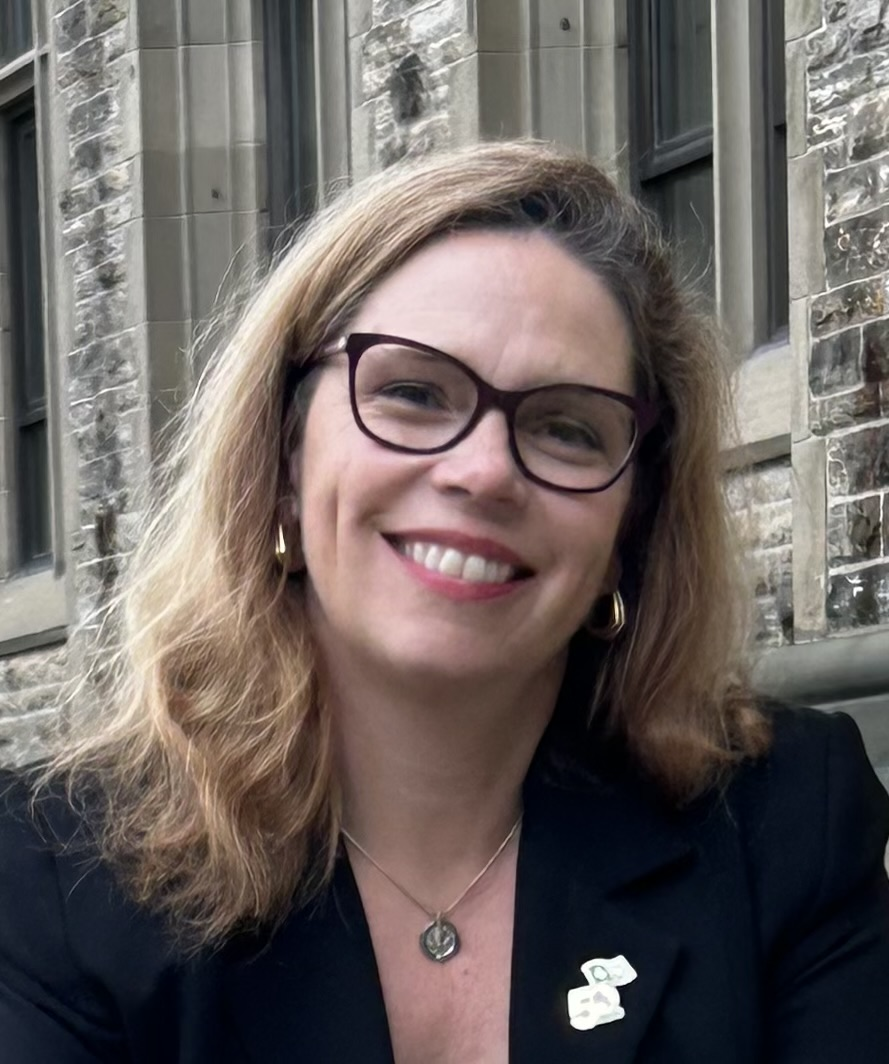

Member of Parliament for Guelph
- Incumbent
- Assumed office April 28, 2025
- Prime Minister: Mark Carney
- Preceded by: Lloyd Longfield

Personal details
- Party: Liberal
- Committees: Standing Committee on Industry and Technology Standing Committee on Transport, Infrastructure and Communities

Dominique O'Rourke is a Canadian politician who has served as the member of Parliament for the riding of Guelph as a member of the Liberal Party since 2025. She previously served as a Guelph city councillor from 2018 to 2025, where she represented Ward 6.

== Background ==
O'Rourke holds a bachelor's degree in economics from the University of Ottawa and a Master of Arts in leadership from the University of Guelph.

== Political career ==
=== Guelph City Council (2018–2025) ===
O'Rourke was first elected to the Guelph City Council in the 2018 municipal election in Ward 6 after garnering 31.8% of the vote. O'Rourke was then re-elected in the 2022 municipal election in Ward 6 with 36.0% of the vote. During O'Rourke's time in office, she served as the chair of its Infrastructure, Development, and Environment Services Committee.

=== 45th Parliament (2025–present) ===
In July 2024, O'Rourke was acclaimed as the Liberal Party candidate for the riding of Guelph after Lloyd Longfield announced that he would not be seeking re-election. O'Rourke was elected in the 2025 federal election with 54.7% of the vote and subsequently stepped down as city councillor.

== Electoral record ==
2025 Canadian federal election: Guelph
Party	Candidate	Votes	%	±%	Expenditures
Liberal	Dominique O'Rourke	36,406	54.67	+13.30	$113,514.97
Conservative	Gurvir Khaira	20,470	30.74	+7.29	$103,498.99
Green	Anne-Marie Zajdlik	6,779	10.18	+2.33	$117,951.99
New Democratic	Janice Folk-Dawson	2,129	3.20	–18.82	$22,995.73
People's	Jeffrey Swackhammer	498	0.75	–3.91	none listed
Marxist–Leninist	Elaine Baetz	132	0.20	N/A	$0.00
Independent	Michael Wassilyn	117	0.8	N/A	$1,139.11
Canadian Future	Yurii Yavorskyi	62	0.09	N/A	$17.25
Total valid votes/expense limit		66,593	99.44	—	$137,921.14
Total rejected ballots		375	0.56		
Turnout		66,968	72.83	+6.43	
Eligible voters		91,946			
Liberal notional hold		Swing		+3.01	
Source: Elections Canada
