= 2014 Guelph municipal election =

- October 27, 2014
- Turnout: 43.21%
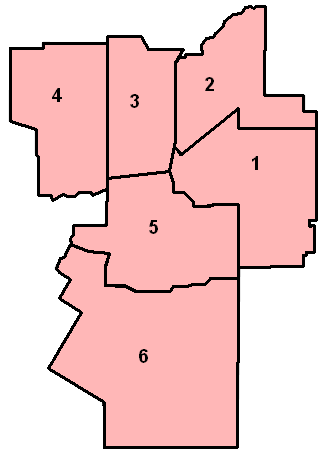
- Map of Guelph's wards

The 2014 Guelph municipal election was held on October 27, 2014, in Guelph, Ontario, Canada, to elect the Mayor of Guelph, Guelph City Council, the Guelph members of the Upper Grand District School Board (Public) and Wellington Catholic District School Board, and the regional members of Conseil Scolaire de District Catholiques Centre-Sud and Conseil Scolaire Viamonde (Public). The election was held in conjunction with the provincewide 2014 municipal elections.

For the first time during this election, the City of Guelph used online voting during the advanced polling, in an attempt to boost voter turnout and increase accessibility options for voters.

== Timeline ==
- January 2: Nomination period begins
- September 12: Nomination period ends
- October 7: Advanced Internet voting begins
- October 15: Advanced ballot voting begins
- October 19: Advanced ballot voting ends
- October 24: Advanced Internet voting ends
- October 27: Election day

== Election results ==
Names in bold denote elected candidates.
(X) denotes incumbent.

=== Mayor ===
One candidate to be elected.

2014 Guelph municipal election: Mayor
Candidate	Votes	%	Δ%	Expenditures (Note: includes expenses not subject to spending limit)
**Cam Guthrie**	19,672	50.75	–	$91,314.72
Karen Farbridge (X)	14,174	36.57	-17.54	$80,263.17
Jason Blokhuis	3,987	10.29	–	$6,766.23
Andrew Donovan	296	0.76	–	$1,074.50
John Legere	269	0.69	–	$7,204.24
Joseph St. Denis	250	0.64	–	$6,192.70
Nicholas A. Ross	112	0.29	–	none listed
Total valid votes/expense limit	38,760	100.0		$82,168.25
Turnout	38,873	43.21		
Eligible voters	89,968			
Sources: 2014 Official Election Results, City of Guelph, 2014 Election - Mayor, City of Guelph, and Voter Statistics, City of Guelph

==== Opinion polls ====
List of opinion polls
Polling firm	Last date of polling	Link	Blokhuis	Farbridge	Guthrie	Other	Don't know/ Wouldn't vote
Forum Research	September 2, 2014	PDF	4	21	**36**	1	36

=== Councillors ===
Two candidates per ward are to be elected.

==== Ward 1 ====
Guelph municipal election, 2014: Ward 1
Candidate	Votes	%	Δ%	Expenditures (Note: includes expenses not subject to spending limit)
**Dan Gibson**	3,419	28.03	–	$5,873.93
**Bob Bell** (X)	2,984	24.46	+4.41	$2,196.70
Karolyne Pickett	2,705	22.17	+9.71	$5,755.34
Terry O'Connor	1,705	13.98	–	$2,406.01
Maria Pezzano	1,386	11.36	–	$4,014.88
Total valid votes/expense limit	12,199	100.0		$18,589.80
Turnout	7,171	43.21		
Eligible voters	16,595			
Sources: 2014 Official Election Results, City of Guelph, 2014 Election - Ward 1, City of Guelph, and Voter Statistics, City of Guelph

==== Ward 2 ====
Guelph municipal election, 2014: Ward 2
Candidate	Votes	%	Δ%	Expenditures (Note: includes expenses not subject to spending limit)
**Andy Van Hellemond** (X)	3,266	27.50	-1.56	$2,012.04
**James Gordon**	2,990	25.17	–	$5,450.18
Ray Ferraro	2,615	22.02	+0.80	$2,458.07
Martin Collier	1,314	11.06	–	$3,662.99
Sian Matwey	1,109	9.34	–	none listed
Chris Keleher Sr.	583	4.91	–	$270.13
Mark Paralovos (withdrawn) (Note: withdrew nomination September 4)	–	–	–	$100.00
Total valid votes/expense limit	11,877	100.0		$16,446.10
Turnout	6,846	48.50		
Eligible voters	14,116			
Sources: 2014 Official Election Results, City of Guelph, 2014 Election - Ward 2, City of Guelph, and Voter Statistics, City of Guelph

==== Ward 3 ====
Guelph municipal election, 2014: Ward 3
Candidate	Votes	%	Δ%	Expenditures (Note: includes expenses not subject to spending limit)
**Phil Allt**	2,299	22.40	–	$6,319.97
**June Hofland** (X)	2,050	19.95	-8.29	$3,580.09
Craig Chamberlain	2,045	19.93	-1.62	$7,773.93
Maggie Laidlaw (X)	1,861	18.13	-11.32	$5,775.68
Bob Moore	1,131	11.02	–	$4,394.66
Jason Dodge	878	8.56	–	$2,059.42
Total valid votes/expense limit	10,264	100.0		$16,356
Turnout	5,789	44.37		
Eligible voters	13,047			
Sources: 2014 Official Election Results, City of Guelph, 2014 Election - Ward 3, City of Guelph, and Voter Statistics, City of Guelph

==== Ward 4 ====
Guelph municipal election, 2014: Ward 4
Candidate	Votes	%	Δ%	Expenditures (Note: includes expenses not subject to spending limit)
**Christine Billings**	2,300	24.68	–	$5,604.14
**Mike Salisbury**	2,197	23.57	+7.50	$3,526.67
Laurie Garbutt	1,061	11.38	–	$2,157.68
Scott Tracey	992	10.64	–	$1,549.15
Gary Walton	760	8.15	–	$2,729.50
Greg Roffey	620	6.65	–	$1,206.50
Greg Schirk	608	6.52	–	none listed
Rob Dunn-Dufault	559	6.00	–	$306.92
Mark Briestensky	224	2.40	–	$100.00
Linda Busuttil (withdrawn) (Note: withdrew nomination and registered for UGDSB 2, 3, & 4 September 10)	–	–	–	$1,076.17
Total valid votes/expense limit	9,321	100.0		$16,630.55
Turnout	5,376	38.65		
Eligible voters	13,909			
Sources: 2014 Official Election Results, City of Guelph, 2014 Election - Ward 4, City of Guelph, and Voter Statistics, City of Guelph

==== Ward 5 ====
Guelph municipal election, 2014: Ward 5
Candidate	Votes	%	Δ%	Expenditures (Note: includes expenses not subject to spending limit)
**Leanne Piper** (X)	3,386	28.44	-11.16	$4,194.71
**Cathy Downer**	2,795	23.48	–	$6,153.20
Scott R. Butler	2,316	19.46	–	$4,322.26
Bob Senechal	1,599	13.43	–	$2,630.22
Dimitrios Jim Galatianos	1,049	8.81	–	none listed
Alex Green	759	6.38	–	$1,937.59
Robert Routledge (withdrawn) (Note: withdrew nomination August 19)	–	–	–	$1,385.84
Lise Burcher (X, withdrawn) (Note: withdrew nomination August 25)	–	–	–	$100.00
Total valid votes/expense limit	11,904	100.0		$21,712.70
Turnout	6,840	44.03		
Eligible voters	15,535			
Sources: 2014 Official Election Results, City of Guelph, 2014 Election - Ward 5, City of Guelph, and Voter Statistics, City of Guelph

==== Ward 6 ====
Guelph municipal election, 2014: Ward 6
Candidate	Votes	%	Δ%	Expenditures (Note: includes expenses not subject to spending limit)
**Mark MacKinnon**	3,806	33.46	–	$3,149.15
**Karl Wettstein** (X)	2,886	25.37	-11.85	$2,527.70
Todd J. Dennis (X)	2,044	17.97	-18.36	$2,586.11
Glen Tolhurst	1,968	17.30	–	$3,446.85
Keith Poore	671	5.90	–	$1,266.55
Total valid votes/expense limit	11,375	100.0		$18,824.40
Turnout	6,851	40.86		
Eligible voters	16,766			
Sources: 2014 Official Election Results, City of Guelph, 2014 Election - Ward 6, City of Guelph, and Voter Statistics, City of Guelph

==== Incumbents not seeking re-election ====
- Lise Burcher (Ward 5)
- Ian Findlay (Ward 2)
- Jim Furfaro (Ward 1)
- Gloria Kovach (Ward 4)

== Upper Grand District School Board ==
=== Wards 1 & 5 ===
Two candidates to be elected.

Guelph municipal election, 2014: Upper Grand District School Board - Wards 1 & 5
Candidate	Votes	%	Δ%	Expenditures (Note: includes expenses not subject to spending limit)
Mark Bailey (X)	4,517	30.84	-7.72	$1,244.06
Martha MacNeil	2,919	19.93	–	$1,701.89
Juanita Burnett	2,249	15.36	+0.78	$1,433.75
Malcolm Bell	1,940	13.25	–	none listed
Ralph Edwards	1,622	11.08	–	$1,657.65
Dan Baker	1,398	9.55	–	$100.00
Total valid votes/expense limit	14,645	100.0		$28,921.55
Sources: 2014 Official Election Results, City of Guelph

=== Wards 2, 3, & 4 ===
Two candidates to be elected.

Guelph municipal election, 2014: Upper Grand District School Board - Wards 2, 3, & 4
Candidate	Votes	%	Δ%	Expenditures (Note: includes expenses not subject to spending limit)
Susan Moziar (X)	5,017	25.48	-8.30	$3,971.84
Linda Busuttil	4,974	25.26	–	$1,769.37
Rob McLean	3,978	20.20	–	$1,714.64
Carrie Proudfoot	3,073	15.61	–	$389.46
Aaron Blair	2,649	13.45	–	none listed
Total valid votes/expense limit	19,691	100.0		$32,132.00
Sources: 2014 Official Election Results, City of Guelph

=== Ward 6 and Puslinch ===
One candidate to be elected.

Guelph municipal election, 2014: Upper Grand District School Board - Ward 6 and Puslinch
Candidate	Votes	%	Δ%	Expenditures (Note: includes expenses not subject to spending limit)
Marty Fairbairn (X)	3,469	61.72	-0.92	$3,416.05
Christopher Cassel	1,424	25.34	–	$100.00
Tyler Rockliffe	727	12.94	–	$262.72
Total valid votes/expense limit	5,620	100.0		$20,022.05
Sources: 2014 Official Election Results, City of Guelph

== Wellington Catholic District School Board ==
Four candidates to be elected.

Guelph municipal election, 2014: Wellington Catholic District School Board
Candidate	Votes	%	Δ%	Expenditures (Note: includes expenses not subject to spending limit)
Joe Tersigni	5,789	29.64	–	$1,113.60
Marino L. Gazzola (X)	4,636	23.74	-1.90	$650.87
Victoria Dupuis (X)	3,577	18.32	-1.17	$788.16
Sebastian Dal Bo (X)	3,155	16.16	-1.02	$228.15
Michelle Fach	2,371	12.14	–	$893.79
Total valid votes/expense limit	19,528	100.0		$18,795.50
Sources: 2014 Official Election Results, City of Guelph

== Conseil Scolaire de District Catholiques Centre-Sud ==
One candidate to be elected, representing Brampton, Caledon, Dufferin County and Wellington County.

Guelph municipal election, 2014: Conseil Scolaire de District Catholiques Centre-Sud
Candidate	Votes	%	Δ%	Expenditures (Note: includes expenses not subject to spending limit)
Geneviève Grenier	145	78.38	–	none listed
Blaise Liaki	32	17.30	–	none listed
Tammy Knibbs (X)	8	4.32	-61.73	none listed
Total valid votes/expense limit	185	100.0		–
Sources: 2014 Official Election Results, City of Guelph

== Conseil Scolaire Viamonde ==
One candidate to be elected, representing Waterloo Region, Middlesex County, Wellington County, Perth County and Huron County.

Guelph municipal election, 2014: Conseil Scolaire Viamonde
Candidate	Votes	%	Δ%	Expenditures (Note: includes expenses not subject to spending limit)
Denis Trudel (X)	73	41.95	–	none listed
Denise Alice Carter	51	29.31	–	none listed
Johanne R. Gray	50	28.74	–	none listed
Total valid votes/expense limit	174	100.0		–
Sources: 2014 Official Election Results, City of Guelph
