= John Weingust =

John Weingust, QC is a veteran lawyer in Toronto, Ontario, Canada. He is a Queen's Counsel, and has been involved in several high-profile cases.

== Legal career ==
Rights of mental health patients

Weingust represented an Ontario mental patient in a prominent human rights case during the early 1980s. The patient in question had never been charged with a criminal offense, but was held in a windowless cell at the Penetanguishene Mental Health Centre for ten years on the grounds that he was prone to violent behaviour. As his representative, Weingust planned to challenge sections of the Ontario Mental Health Act that allowed a person to be certified and imprisoned without a hearing, arguing that such policy contravened the Canadian Charter of Rights and Freedoms. He withdrew his application when the patient was transferred to a medium-security facility.

Weingust became an adviser to the Canadian Association for the Welfare of Psychiatric Patients through his involvement in this case. He lamented the state of Ontario's mental institutions in guest columns for The Globe and Mail newspaper, and called for significant reforms to the Mental Health Act. In 1984, he wrote an opinion piece against involuntary electroshock treatment.

Parking tickets

Weingust has become well known in recent years for challenging the legality of parking tickets, mostly his own. He once claimed that he received about 60 tickets a year, and beat 59 of them. He explained to a reporter that he has studied Toronto's parking by-laws in detail, and knows how to exploit loopholes. Weingust has argued that Toronto's ticketing system is essentially unjust, and is used by the municipal government for revenue rather than as a serious means of relieving traffic congestion.

In 2004, he argued that Ontario's Municipal Act did not grant municipalities the power to issue traffic tickets. The court did not accept his argument.

Other cases

Weingust represented a tobacco farmer who had been denied a license by the Ontario Fine-Cured Tobacco Growers' Marketing Board in 1965. Weingust criticized the board's powers to destroy crops grown in contravention of its mandate, arguing that only dictatorial regimes had ever made use of such powers.

In 1984, Weingust successfully argued before the Supreme Court of Ontario that a divorced woman should receive half of her husband's company pension. This was the first such test of the Ontario Family Law Reform Act before the Supreme Court.

In 2002, Weingust argued that the City of Toronto had no right to charge ticket scalpers with an offense. He argued that a bylaw requiring a licence to sell "goods, wares or merchandise" did not specifically cover the sale of tickets, and therefore could not be used to prosecute scalpers. He also described scalping as a "victimless crime" that served a useful function for ordinary consumers. On this occasion, his argument was unsuccessful.

== Other ==
Weingust was appointed as Queen's Counsel in 1979. He holds a fifth-degree black belt in Taekwon-Do.

He was a fringe candidate for Mayor of Toronto in the 2006 municipal election, describing himself as someone "who has been fighting traffic tickets for over 30 years as an advocate for motorists". He argued that parking tickets were a disguised form of taxation, and that they were illegal. He received 312 votes, finishing in 37th place. He was 76 years old during the campaign.

Weingust has also written several Letters to the Editor over the years, on a variety of different subjects. An avid sports fan, he wrote a 1993 feature in The Globe and Mail newspaper against a trend toward brawling in hockey.

On September 25, 1991, the Toronto Star newspaper printed one of his remarks as its "quote of the day": "Justice is blind, but the jury system is its guide dog".

In 2008, Weingust launched a website, , to voice his opinions and concerns against the unfairness of gas and oil prices to the average consumer.
