= Guelph City Hall =

Local government building in Ontario, Canada

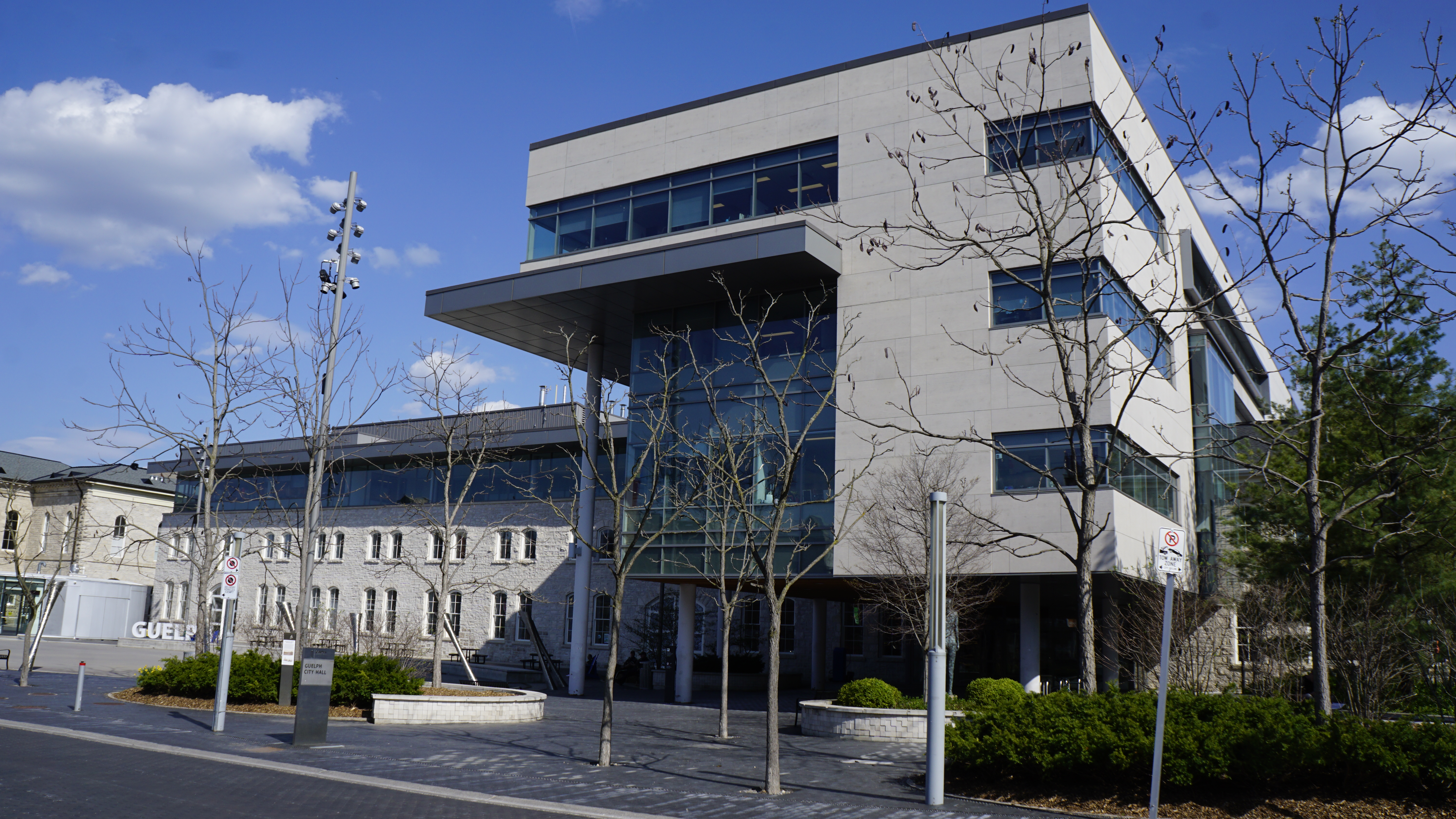
- Interactive map of the Guelph City Hall area

General information
- Location: 1 Carden Street; Guelph, Ontario; N1H 3A1
- Coordinates: 43°32′36″N 80°14′54″W
- Construction started: 2006
- Completed: 2009
- Cost: $42,890,635

Design and construction
- Architecture firm: Moriyama & Teshima Architects

Guelph City Hall is the seat of local government in Guelph, Ontario, Canada.

Designed by Moriyama & Teshima Architects and completed in 2009, the new City Hall is located adjacent to the historic Old City Hall, which itself is now serving as a Provincial Offences Courthouse. Prior to the construction of the new City Hall, municipal departments had been spread across five different downtown locations. The Guelph Memorial Gardens arena was demolished to make way for the new civic building.

The City Hall was built to meet the LEED Silver standard set out by the Canada Green Building Council. As a result, operating costs are 30 to 40 percent lower than that of a similarly sized typical office building.
