= Old City Hall (Guelph) =

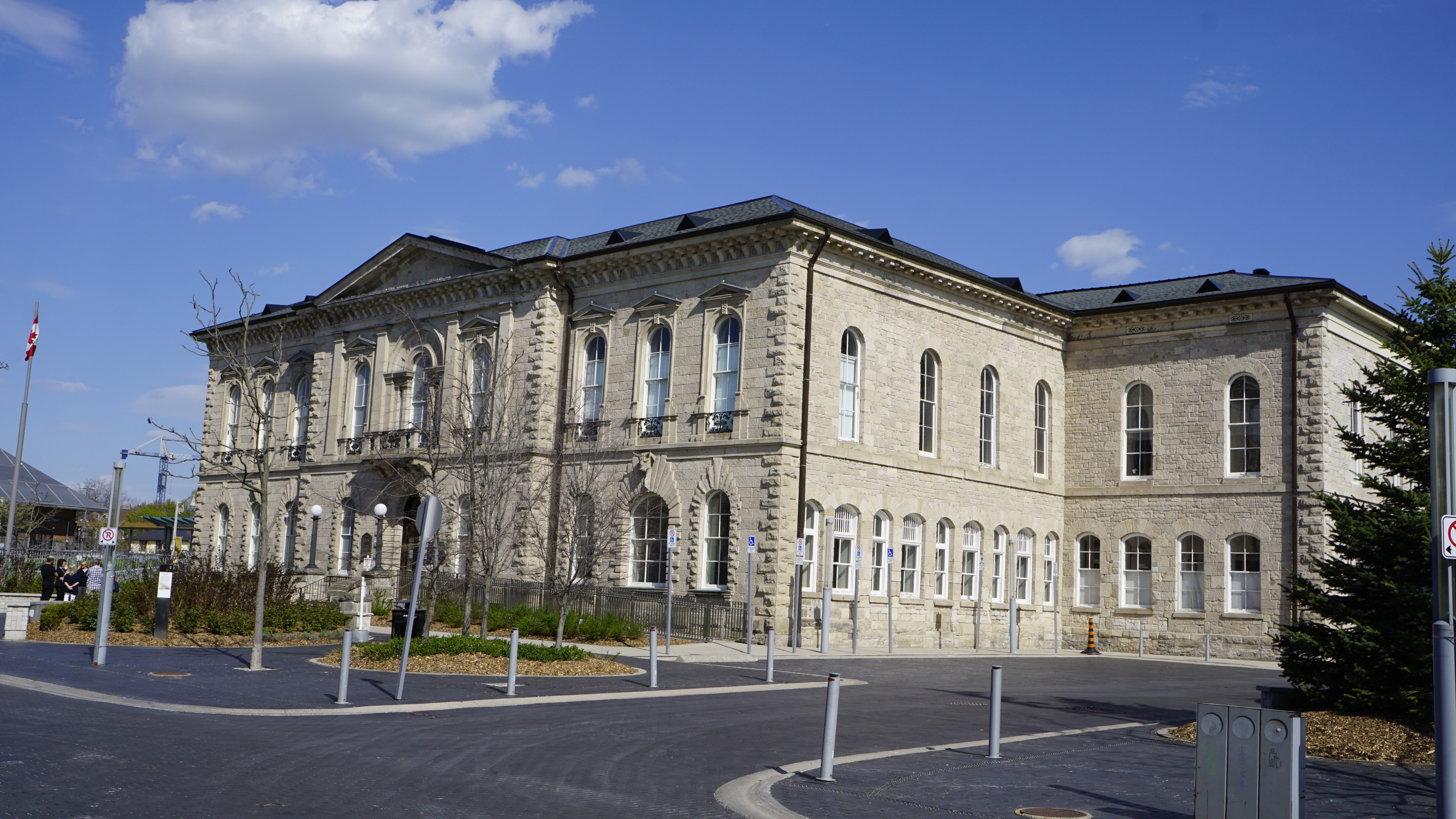
- Old City Hall in 2023

- Location within Ontario
- Former names: Guelph City Hall
- Alternative names: Guelph Provincial Offences Courthouse

General information
- Type: Courthouse
- Location: 59 Carden Street, Guelph, Ontario, Canada
- Coordinates: 43°32′38″N 80°14′52″W
- Current tenants: Provincial Offences Court
- Construction started: 1856
- Completed: 1857
- Owner: City of Guelph

Design and construction
- Architect: William Thomas

National Historic Site of Canada
- Official name: Guelph City Hall National Historic Site of Canada
- Designated: 1984

Ontario Heritage Act
- Designated: 1978

Old City Hall is a historic building and a National Historic Site of Canada in Guelph, Ontario, Canada, which until April 2009 served as the headquarters of the city government. The building is now used as the Provincial Offences Courthouse, which handles matters such as traffic tickets, trespassing and liquor licence violations.

== History ==
The hall was designed in the Renaissance Revival style by Toronto architect William Thomas, and constructed 1856–1857. The building, which included an indoor market area, administrative offices, and a large assembly hall, was constructed from locally quarried stone.

In 1984, it was designated a National Historic Site because

[I]t is an example of a multi-functional city hall; it symbolized the city's confidence in its future; and the smoothly dressed stonework and delicate carving of the exterior design provide an elegant and refined example of civic architecture in a classical style.

The building is also designated under Part 4 of the Ontario Heritage Act.
