= William Clarke (Canadian physician) =

Irish-born Canadian physician and politician

William Clarke (ca 1813 – October 7, 1887) was an Irish-born medical doctor and politician in Ontario, Canada. He represented Wellington North in the Legislative Assembly of the Province of Canada from 1854 to 1857 and from 1861 to 1863 and was mayor of Guelph from 1864 to 1867.

He was born in Maryborough, Queen's County and was admitted to the Royal College of Surgeons in Ireland in 1836. While in Dublin, he had become involved in the Orange Order, at that time illegal. Fearing an investigation by the authorities, Clarke came to Upper Canada. He was admitted to the practice of medicine there in 1839. He became a member of the College of Physicians and Surgeons of Upper Canada the following year. He settled in the village of Guelph, becoming one of the first physicians there. Clarke was a commissioner of the Court of Requests, a justice of the peace and also served as warden for Wellington County. He was a director of the Guelph and Galt Railway. He helped establish the College of Physicians and Surgeons of Ontario and served as its president from 1869 to 1874.

He was married twice: first to Laura Ann Secord, the daughter of Laura Secord and the widow of Captain John Poore, and then to Clara Pigott Strange, the widow of Judge William Dummer Powell.

Clarke died in Guelph at the age of 74.

His son Lionel Herbert Clarke was a prominent Toronto merchant and served as Lieutenant Governor of Ontario.
