= Kate Quarrie =

Canadian politician

Her Worship Kate Quarrie

59th Mayor of Guelph
- In office 2003–2006
- Preceded by: Karen Farbridge
- Succeeded by: Karen Farbridge

Kate Quarrie is a Canadian politician who served as the second female mayor of Guelph, Ontario from 2003 to 2006.

A native of Guelph, Kate Quarrie was defeated by Karen Farbridge in the November 2006 municipal election.
