= Cam Guthrie =

Canadian politician

60th Mayor of Guelph
- In office December 1, 2014 – November 15, 2026
- Preceded by: Karen Farbridge
- Succeeded by: Leanne Caron

Personal details
- Born: October 18, 1975 (age 51) Guelph, Ontario, Canada
- Party: Independent
- Children: 2
- Website: Official website

Cam Guthrie is a Canadian politician, who served as the 60th mayor of Guelph from December 1, 2014 to November 15, 2026. In the 2022 Ontario municipal elections, he was re-elected mayor for a third term.

== Personal life ==
Guthrie is a third-generation Guelphite born into a family with Scottish immigrant roots. His family includes a number of independent businessmen. Before entering politics, Guthrie was an insurance agent. His father was a chiropractor, and his grandfather owned and operated Guthrie's Bakery in downtown Guelph, started by his great-grandfather in 1919. He also served on the boards of some local not-for-profit organizations. Guthrie had previously graduated with a business diploma from Sir Sandford Fleming College.

He has been a drummer for the local bands, including the synth-pop musical group Fitness Club Fiasco, and has been involved in the production of several music albums. Fitness Club Fiasco were finalists in CBC Music's Searchlight competition in 2014. He is the cousin of musician Jim Guthrie.

Guthrie regularly attends services at Lakeside Church.

He and his wife Rachel have a son and a daughter.

== Career in politics ==
Prior to his election to the mayoralty, Guthrie represented Ward 4 on Guelph City Council. Guthrie first ran for city councillor in 2006 but lost to Mike Salisbury by 194 votes. He ran again for councillor in 2010 and defeated Salisbury by 1,182 votes.

In the 2014 municipal election, Guthrie was elected mayor of Guelph, defeating incumbent mayor Karen Farbridge by 5,498 votes and claiming just over 50% of the popular vote. In his inaugural address, Guthrie stated that his priorities would continue to be limiting tax increases to the rate of inflation, reviewing the transit system, improving customer service at City Hall, and addressing an infrastructure deficit.

He was re-elected mayor in 2018 with 65.82% of the ballots, on a "A Stronger, Safer Community" platform which included a plan for greater investments in police services and infrastructure.

Guthrie was re-elected for mayor for third term in 2022.

In March 2026, Guthrie announced his intent to not seek re-election.

== Electoral record ==
2014 Guelph municipal election: Mayor
| Candidate | Votes | % | Δ% | Expenditures (Note: includes expenses not subject to spending limit) |
|---|---|---|---|---|
| Cam Guthrie | 19,672 | 50.75 | – | $91,314.72 |
| Karen Farbridge (X) | 14,174 | 36.57 | -17.54 | $80,263.17 |
| Jason Blokhuis | 3,987 | 10.29 | – | $6,766.23 |
| Andrew Donovan | 296 | 0.76 | – | $1,074.50 |
| John Legere | 269 | 0.69 | – | $7,204.24 |
| Joseph St. Denis | 250 | 0.64 | – | $6,192.70 |
| Nicholas A. Ross | 112 | 0.29 | – | none listed |
| Total valid votes/expense limit | 38,760 | 100.0 | | $82,168.25 |
| Turnout | 38,873 | 43.21 | | |
| Eligible voters | 89,968 | | | |
Sources: 2014 Official Election Results, City of Guelph, 2014 Election - Mayor, City of Guelph, and Voter Statistics, City of Guelph
