= Norm Jary =

Canadian politician and broadcaster (1929–2021)

Mayor of Guelph
- In office 1970–1985
- Preceded by: Ralph Smith
- Succeeded by: John Counsell

Personal details
- Born: April 8, 1929 Toronto, Ontario, Canada
- Died: January 8, 2021 (aged 91) Guelph, Ontario, Canada
- Spouse: Jean Jary (1951–2015, her death)
- Children: 4

Norman Willard Jary (April 8, 1929 – January 8, 2021) was a Canadian politician and broadcaster who served as Mayor of Guelph from 1970 to 1985. He is the longest serving mayor in Guelph’s history. Outside of politics, Jary served as the news and sports director of CJOY and had a one year stint as the play-by-play announcer of the New York Rangers.

== Broadcasting ==
Jary was born on April 8, 1929, in Toronto. He graduated from Ryerson University's Academy of Radio and Television Arts. In 1951, he joined CJCS-FM in Stratford, Ontario. In 1954 he was hired by CJOY as sports director and hockey play-by-play announcer. He eventually took on the role of news director as well. During his tenure at CJOY, he called games for the Guelph Biltmores, Guelph Royals, Guelph CMC’s/Mad Hatters/Platers, and Guelph Regals. He also playoff games for the Galt Hornets and Chatham Maroons and filled-in for Foster Hewitt on CKFH’s broadcasts of the Toronto Marlboros and Toronto St. Michael's Majors. Jary was a member of the New York Rangers television broadcast team during the 1965-66 season. He was behind the microphone when Bobby Hull broke Maurice Richard's single season record for goals scored. He also called the first National Hockey League game televised in colour in the United States. Jary continued to live in Guelph during his season with the Rangers, commuting to New York City on the weekend. He remained with CJOY until his retirement in 1994.

== Politics ==
Jary began his political career in 1963 as the Progressive Conservative nominee for the Legislative Assembly of Ontario seat in Wellington South. He lost to incumbent Harry Worton. He was the PC nominee again in 1967, but again lost to Worton.

Jary was elected to the Guelph board of aldermen in 1963. In 1970, Mayor Ralph Smith resigned to accept the position of city industrial commissioner and Jary was chosen by his fellow aldermen to fill the vacancy. He ran unopposed in 1971 and continued to serve until 1985, when he chose to instead run for city council to "avoid burnout".

As mayor, Jary instituted reforms that allowed for greater public participation during city council meetings. He cast tie-breaking votes against granting a heritage designation to the Canada Trust building, in favour of the building of the Hanlon Expressway, and in favour of accepting the donation of the nude fountain to be placed in St. George's Square. Jary worked with Wellington County, Ontario, to assess the impact of creating a Regional municipality. Guelph and Wellington decided not to adopt this form of government. During his tenure, the Hanlon Expressway, Stone Road Mall, Willow West Mall, Guelph Auto Mall, New Guelph Civic Museum, Victoria Road Recreation Centre, Centennial Arena, and Eaton Centre were all constructed. Jary hosted a number of dignitaries, including four governors general and three prime ministers of Canada, three premiers of Ontario, Princess Anne, the Shah of Iran, and the Premier of the People's Republic of China. He also greeted Terry Fox during his Marathon of Hope.

From 1985 to 2000, Jary represented Ward 3 on the Guelph city council. In 1999, the council voted to rename Willowdale Park in Jary’s honor.

== Later life ==
After leaving the council, Jary remained involved in the Guelph community through charitable work. From 1978 to 2019 he hosted the Norm Jary Golf Tournament, which raised money for Community Living Guelph Wellington. In 2015 his wife of 64 years, Jean, died.

Jary spent his later years in a Guelph retirement community. He died on January 8, 2021, at the age of 91.
