= List of mayors of Guelph =

Mayor of Guelph
- Flag of Guelph
- Incumbent; Cam Guthrie since 2014
- Style: Mayor, His/Her Worship
- Member of: City Council
- Reports to: City Council
- Seat: Guelph City Hall (Guelph, Ontario, Canada)
- Appointer: Directly elected by residents of Guelph
- Formation: 1878; 148 years ago
- First holder: George Howard
- Salary: $93,362 including honorarium for sitting on police board (2011)
- Website: Mayor's Office

This is list of mayors of Guelph, Ontario, Canada. Guelph was founded on April 23, 1879 and incorporated as a town on January 1, 1856. Guelph officially became a city on April 23, 1879.

== Chain of office ==
Since 1967, each sitting mayor has been honoured and presented with the chain of office to wear during their term of office. It is to be worn at city council meetings and other formal functions. The chain contains 17 shields engraved with subjects of local significance. The chain is also engraved with the names of the mayors who have worn it since it was commissioned. There are currently seven names of previous mayors engraved on the chain.

== List of mayors ==
=== Town of Guelph ===
Mayor	Years active
John Smith	1856
George Smiley	1857
George Elliott	1858
James Webster	1859 (Note: Prior to 1859, mayors were elected by council)
John Harvey	1860
T.S. Parker	1861
George Palmer	1862
H.W. Peterson	1863
William Clarke	1864-1865
Peter Gow	1866-1867
Nathaniel Higinbotham	1868
George S. Herod	1869-1870
Richard Mitchell	1871-1872
Adam Robertson	1873
John Harris	1874
Robert Melvin	1875-1876
F.J. Chadwick	1877
George Howard	1878

=== City of Guelph ===
Mayor	Years active
George Howard	1879
George Sleeman	1880-1882
Caleb Chase	1883-1884
Wm Stevenson	1885-1886
A H MacDonald	1887-1888
Thos. Gowdy	1889-1890
Thomas Goldie	1891-1892
W.G Smith	1893-1894
J. A Lamprey	1895-1896
Jas Hewer	1897-1898
R.E Nelson	1899-1900
John Kennedy	1901-1902
John Hamilton	1903-1904
George Sleeman	1905-1906
John Newstead	1907-1908
Geo. D. Hastings	1909-1910
Geo. Thorpe	1911-1912
Samuel Carter	1913-1914
H. Mahoney	1915-1916
John Newstead	1917-1918
J.E Carter	1919
H. Westoby	1920
Chas Burgess	1921
Frank Howard	1922
Wm Stephens	1923-1924
George A. Drew	1925
R.B Robson	1926-1931
O.G Lye	1932
R.B Robson	1933-1934
H. Mahoney	1935-1936
D.E Kennedy	1937
W. G Taylor	1938-1942
R.B Robson	1943-1944
Gordon L. Rife	1945-1949
J.A Clare	1950-1951
Harry Worton	1952-1955
Harold Suitter	1956-1957
David Hastings	1958-1960
William E. Hamilton	1961-1962
Ralph Smith	1963-1967
Paul W. Mercer	1968-1969
Ralph Smith	1970
Norm Jary	1970-1985
John G.C Counsell	1986-1994
Joe Young	1994-2000
Karen Farbridge	2000-2003
Kate Quarrie	2003-2006
Karen Farbridge	2006-2014
Cam Guthrie	2014-2026
Leanne Caron	2026–present
