= Guelph City Council =

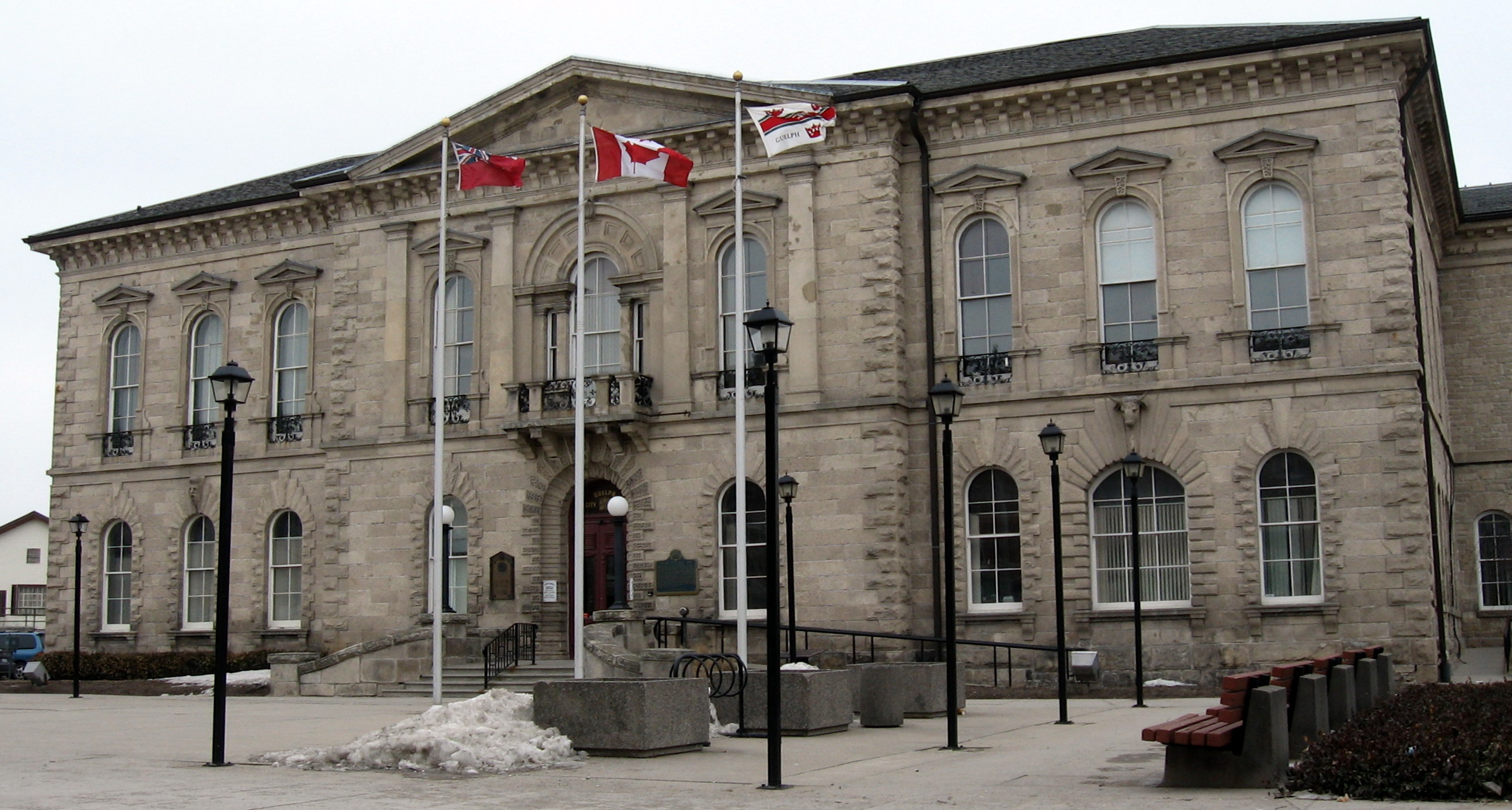
Old Guelph City Hall, 2007

Guelph City Council is the governing body for the city of Guelph, Ontario.

The council consists of the Mayor of Guelph and 12 ward councillors. Each ward elects 2 members to represent them. The council operates in the Guelph City Hall.

Municipal elections are held every four years. The last election took place October 24, 2022.

== Wards ==
Guelph is divided into six wards for the purposes of municipal organization:

- Ward 1 (St Patrick's) comprises the easternmost area of Guelph, bound in the west by Victoria Road.
- Ward 2 (St. George's) is between the Speed River and Victoria Road, and north of the Eramosa River.
- Ward 3 (St John's) is west and north of the Speed River, and east of the Hanlon Expressway; it includes Downtown Guelph.
- Ward 4 (St. David's) comprises the area west of the Hanlon Expressway and north of the Speed River.
- Ward 5 (St. Andrew's) is the area immediately south of the Speed and Eramosa Rivers; this ward includes the University of Guelph and Stone Road Mall.
- Ward 6 (St. James) comprises the southernmost area of Guelph, bound in the north by Stone Road, Kortright Road West, and Arkell Road.

Ward boundaries were updated in 2021 to reflect changes in population distribution and future growth; however, the number of wards and councillors remains the same for the 2022 Ontario municipal elections.

== 2022–2026 Guelph City Council Members ==
Councillor	Ward	First elected
Cam Guthrie	Mayor	2014; City Councillor (2010–2014)
Erin Caton	1	2022
Dan Gibson	1	2014
Rodrigo Goller	2	2018
Carly Klassen	2	2022
Phil Allt	3	2014
Michelle Richardson	3	2022
Christine Billings	4	2014; Ward 6 Councillor (1997–2000; 2003–2010)
Linda Busuttil	4	2022
Cathy Downer	5	2014 (previous term: 1994–2006)
Leanne Piper	5	2006
Ken Yee Chew	6	2022
vacant	6	2025 Dominique O'Rourke resigned when elected to House of Commons

== 2018–2022 Guelph City Council Members ==
Councillor	Ward	Notes
Cam Guthrie	Mayor	2014–present, City Councillor (2010–2014)
Bob Bell	1 – St. Patrick's	2006–present
Dan Gibson	1 – St. Patrick's	2014–present
Rodrigo Goller	2 – St. George's	2018–present
James Gordon	2 – St. George's	2014–present, Former Provincial NDP Candidate
Phil Allt	3 – St. John's	2014–present, Former Federal NDP Candidate
June Hofland	3 – St. John's	2006–present
Christine Billings	4 – St. David's	2014–present, Ward 6 Councillor (1997–2000, 2003–2010)
Mike Salisbury	4 – St. David's	2006–2010, 2014–present
Cathy Downer	5 – St. Andrew's	1994–2006, 2014–present
Leanne Piper	5 – St. Andrew's	2006–present
Mark C. MacKinnon	6 – St. James	2014–present
Dominique O'Rourke	6 – St. James	2018–2025

== 2014–2018 Guelph City Council Members ==
Councillor	Ward	Notes
Cam Guthrie	Mayor	2014–present, City Councillor (2010–2014)
Bob Bell	1 – St. Patrick's	2006–present
Dan Gibson	1 – St. Patrick's	2014–present
James Gordon	2 – St. George's	2014–present, Former Provincial NDP Candidate
Andy Van Hellemond	2 – St. George's	2010–2018, Former NHL Referee
Phil Allt	3 – St. John's	2014–present, Former Federal NDP Candidate
June Hofland	3 – St. John's	2006–present
Christine Billings	4 – St. David's	2014–present, Ward 6 Councillor (1997–2010)
Mike Salisbury	4 – St. David's	2006–2010, 2014–present
Cathy Downer	5 – St. Andrew's	1994–2006, 2014–present
Leanne Piper	5 – St. Andrew's	2006–present
Mark C. MacKinnon	6 – St. James	2014–present
Karl Wettstein	6 – St. James	2000–2018

== See also ==
- See List of Guelph municipal elections for previous election results
