= McCrae (surname) =

See also McRae (disambiguation) and MacRae (disambiguation)

McCrae is a surname. Notable people with the surname include:

- Alex McCrae, Scottish footballer
- Andrew McCrae (1886–1915), Scottish footballer
- David McCrae, Scottish footballer
- George McCrae, American soul and disco singer
- Sir George McCrae, Scottish textile merchant and politician
- George Gordon McCrae, Australian poet
- Georgiana McCrae, Australian painter and diarist
- Gwen McCrae, American R&B singer
- Hugh McCrae, Australian writer
- James McCrae (footballer), Scottish footballer
- James McCrae (politician) politician in Manitoba, Canada
- John McCrae, Canadian poet, physician, author, artist and soldier
- Mahdi McCrae, Australian artist and cartoonist
- Robert R. McCrae, American psychologist
- Robert McCrae (footballer), Scottish footballer
- Romone McCrae, British footballer
- Stewart McCrae (cartoonist), Australian cartoonist
- Stewart McCrae (politician), politician from Alberta, Canada
- Thomas McCrae (politician), farmer, innkeeper and political figure in Upper Canada
- Thomas McCrae (physician), Professor of Medicine at Jefferson Medical College
- William McCrae, farmer and political figure in Upper Canada. Son of Thomas McCrae

Fictional characters:

- Augustus "Gus" McCrae, a fictional Texas Ranger in the Lonesome Dove series
- Captain B. McCrea, the captain of the Axiom in the movie WALL-E.
