= McCrae (disambiguation) =

McCrae, Victoria is a suburb of Melbourne, Australia.

McCrae may also refer to:

== People ==
- McCrae (surname)

== Places ==
- McCrae Homestead, a historic property in McCrae, Victoria
- McCrae, Ontario, a community in Addington Highlands, Ontario, Canada
- McCrae House, birthplace of Canadian poet John McCrae
- John McCrae Secondary School, a public secondary school in Nepean, Ontario, Canada
- McCrea, Louisiana

== See also ==
- MacRae (disambiguation)
- McRae (disambiguation)
- McCray (disambiguation)
