= McCroskey =

McCroskey is a surname. Notable people with the surname include:

== People ==
- Richard McCroskey, convicted of the Farmville murders, Virginia in 2009
- Thomas J. McCroskey (1874–1948), Mayor of Anchorage, Alaska from 1933 to 1934
- Virgil T. McCroskey (1876–1970), American conservationist

== Fictional characters ==
- Steve McCroskey, a character in the 1980 comedy film Airplane!, portrayed by Lloyd Bridges

== See also ==
- McCroskey State Park in Idaho, United States
- McCarey (disambiguation)
- McCloskey (disambiguation)
- McCray (disambiguation)
- McCrea (disambiguation)
- McCrory (disambiguation)
