= Cluskey =

Cluskey is a surname. Notable people with the surname include:

- Charles B. Cluskey (ca. 1808–1871), American architect
- Frank Cluskey (1930–1989), Irish Labour Party politician
- James Cluskey (born 1986), Irish tennis player
- May Cluskey (1927–1991), Irish stage, film and television actress
- Michael Walsh Cluskey (1832–1873), Confederate politician
- Stephen Cluskey (born 1984), social entrepreneur and advocate

== See also ==
- McCluskey, surname
- The Bachelors, musical ensemble
