= Thomas McCrae =

Thomas McCrae may refer to:

- Thomas McCrae (politician) (died 1814), farmer, innkeeper and political figure in Upper Canada
- Thomas McCrae (physician) (1870–1935), professor of medicine at Jefferson Medical College
