= McRae =

McRae is a Scottish Gaelic surname. It may refer to:

== People ==
- McRae (surname)

== Places ==
=== Canada ===
- McRae, Alberta

=== United States ===
- McRae, Alabama
- McRae, Arkansas
- McRae, Florida
- McRae, Georgia
  - McRae–Helena, Georgia, formed by the 2015 merger of the two cities
- McRae, Virginia
- Fort McRae, a Union Army post in what is now Sierra County, New Mexico

== Other uses ==
- CSS McRae, a Confederate gunboat in the American Civil War
- McRae River, a river in the Marlborough Region of New Zealand's South Island
- McRae River (Western Australia), a river in the Kimberley region of Western Australia
- McRae's, an American department store chain

== See also ==
- Clan MacRae, Scottish clan
- Governor McRae (disambiguation)
- Justice McRae (disambiguation)
- MacRae (disambiguation)
- McCray (disambiguation)
