= Guelph Civic Museum =

History museum in Guelph, Ontario

Coordinates: 43.5438°N 80.2506°W

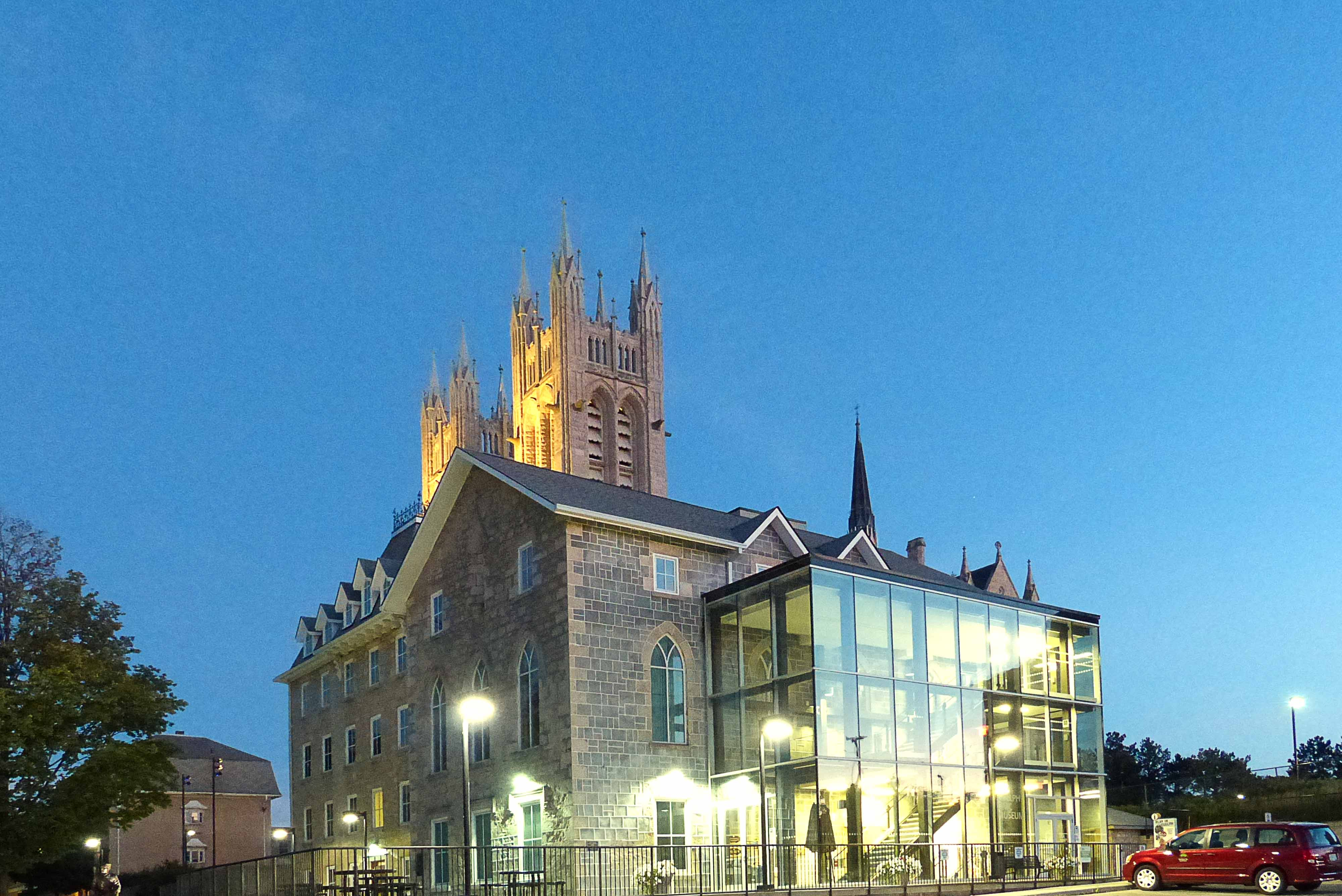
- Established: 1967
- Location: 52 Norfolk Street, Guelph, Ontario, N1H 4H8
- Visitors: 33,000+ (2010)
- Director: Tammy Adkin
- Public transit access: Norfolk at Albion. Stop ID: 1101
- Website: Guelph Civic Museum

The Guelph Civic Museum is a museum of culture and natural history located in Guelph, Ontario. It was established to explore the culture and natural history of Guelph through exhibitions and public programs. In 2012, it opened a new location at 52 Norfolk St., after having previously been located in a three-story building at 6 Dublin Street South.

The Guelph Civic Museum showcases Guelph's history through permanent and changing exhibits, a fun and interactive family gallery, and special events and activities. Located in the recently renovated Loretto Convent, atop the hill at Norfolk Street, and beside the landmark Church of Our Lady, the museum is home to a collection of over 30,000 artifacts that bring Guelph's past to life. Many of the items in the museum have been donated by citizens of the city of Guelph.

The museum was closed to the public on June 30, 2011, in preparation for a transition to a new building, and reopened at 52 Norfolk Street in January 2012.

== History of the museum ==
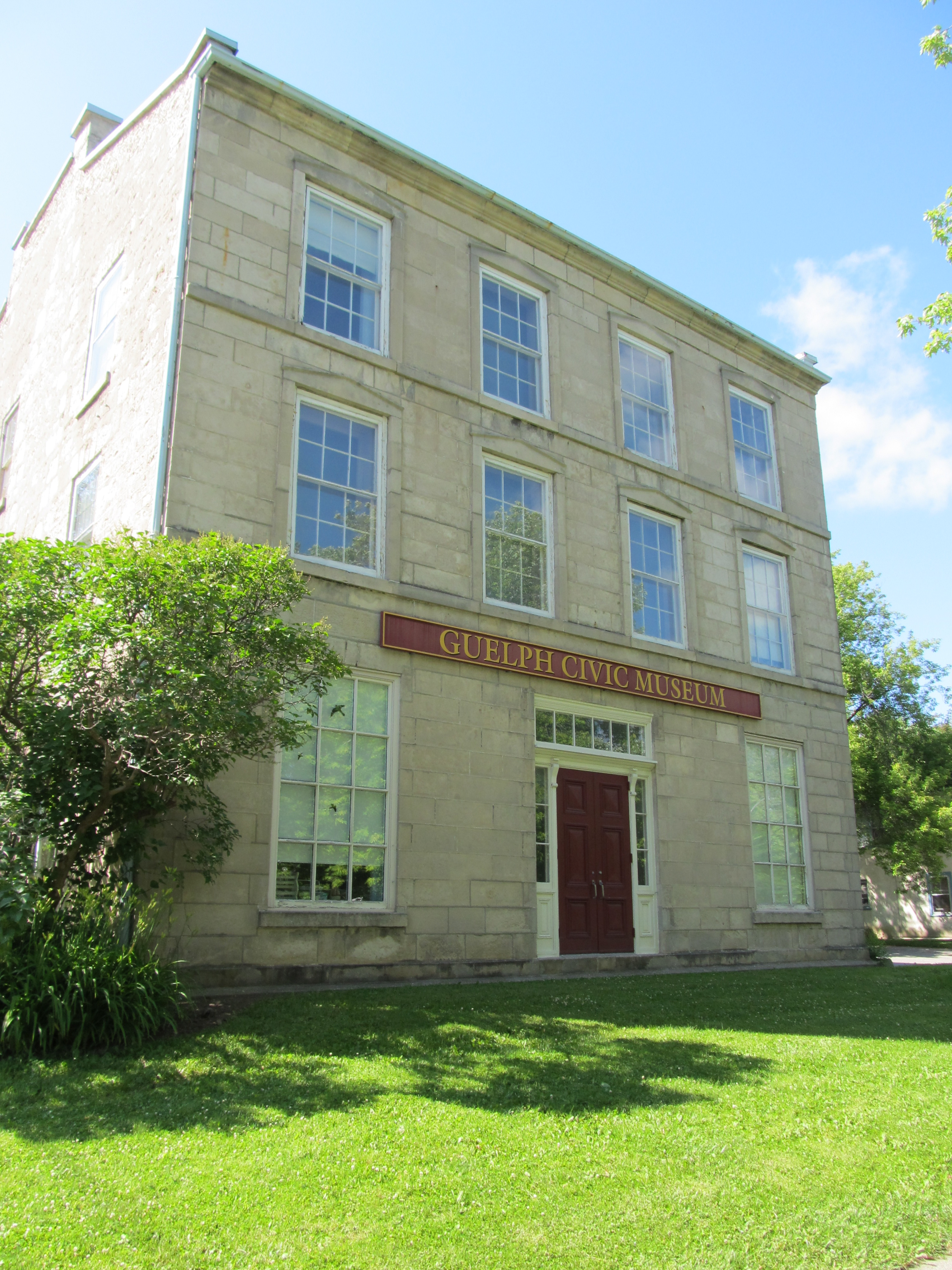
Home of the museum from 1977 to 2011 at 6 Dublin St. South.

The proposal for a memory bank of significant parts of events in Guelph was first brought about by the Museum Board of Management, which was formed in 1964. Collections were already being compiled by Guelph's Historical Society two years earlier. Guelph had temporary exhibits in several locations before the museum's official opening at the Winter Fair Horse Stables (which is now the Guelph Farmer's Market) in December 1967. A sewing exhibit was set up in the Delhi Street Recreation Centre in 1965, and several others were displayed at the Guelph Public Library in 1967, a year which also saw a "summer museum" located at 98 Wyndam Street. From 1967 onwards, the museum remained in the former stables, but by the 1970s, it was becoming crowded and needed more room. The building on 6 Dublin Street was purchased in 1977, and on May 18, 1980 (the date of International Museum Day), it opened its doors as the new Guelph Civic Museum. The issue of space seems to be a never-ending one, as the museum is moving to a bigger location once again in the summer of 2011. It will be located in the Loretto Convent, which is located beside the Basilica of Our Lady Immaculate downtown. Renovations are predicted to be complete by the fall of September 2011.

The building that housed the museum for over thirty years at 6 Dublin Street South has a fair amount of history of its own. Designed by William Thomas, it was built in 1847 in Georgian style. The building is made of limestone, is 11,000 square feet (1,000 m^{2}) in size, and was originally owned by the Robert Day family. It has been home to many different things since its creation, including various businesses such as a tavern and a hotel. The building was used as a boarding house for the Ontario Agricultural College, by the Great War Veterans Association, and finally by the Canadian Legion and the Knights of Columbus as a meeting hall until it was sold to the city in 1977.

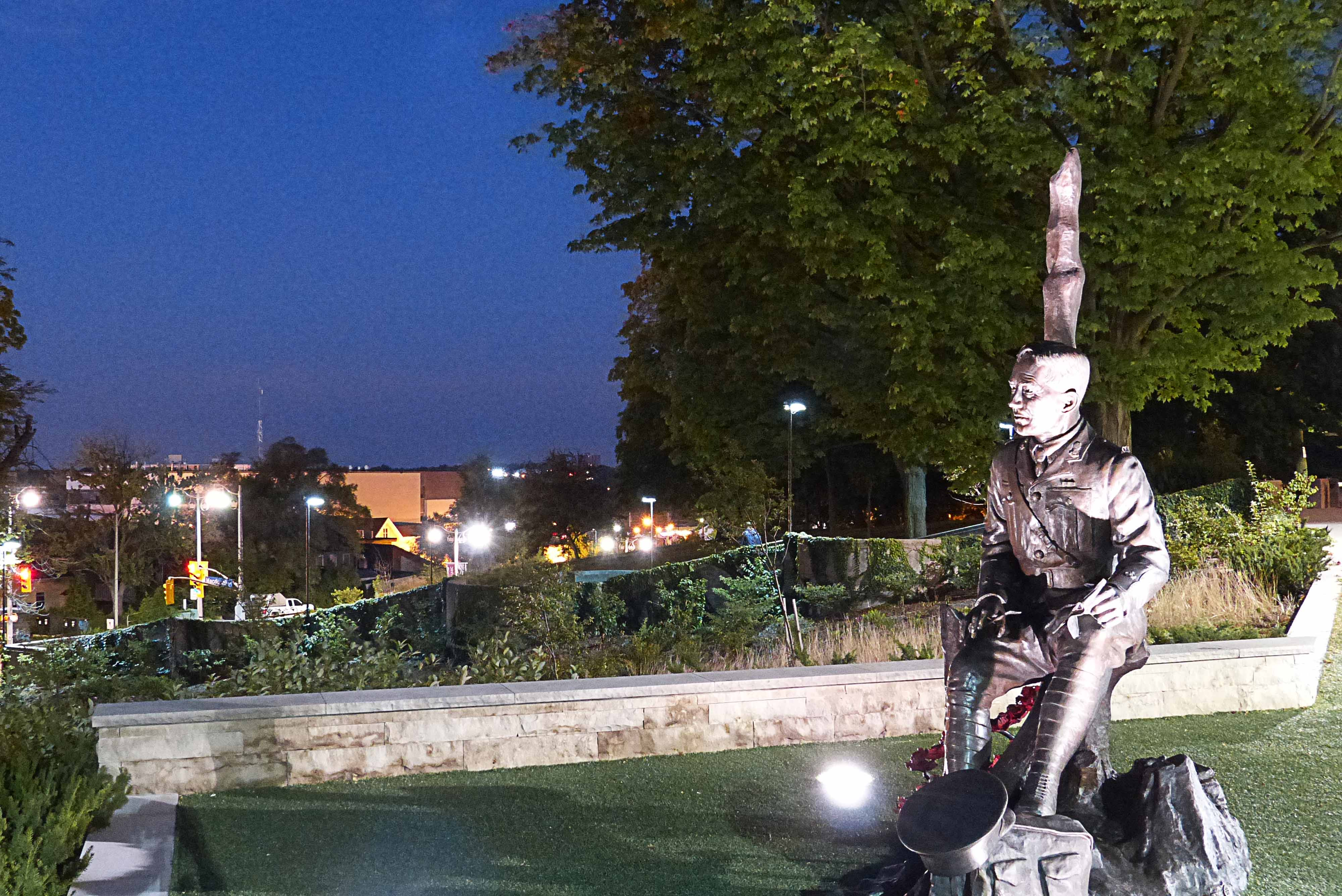
"Remember Flanders", by Ruth Abernethy

A sculpture of Lieutenant Colonel John McCrae by Ruth Abernethy was erected in the foreground of the Guelph Civic Museum in 2015. Lieutenant-Colonel John McCrae is shown, with his dress as an artillery officer and his medical bag nearby, as he writes. The statue shows the destruction of the battlefield and, at his feet, the poppies, which are a symbol of the memory of World War I and all armed conflicts since.

McCrae House at 108 Water Street is also part of the Guelph Museums. It is the birthplace of John McCrae, the author of the famous poem In Flanders Fields, written during World War I. He was a prominent figure in Canada's history, and thus, his house was preserved in remembrance of him and of his life and times.

== Major attractions ==
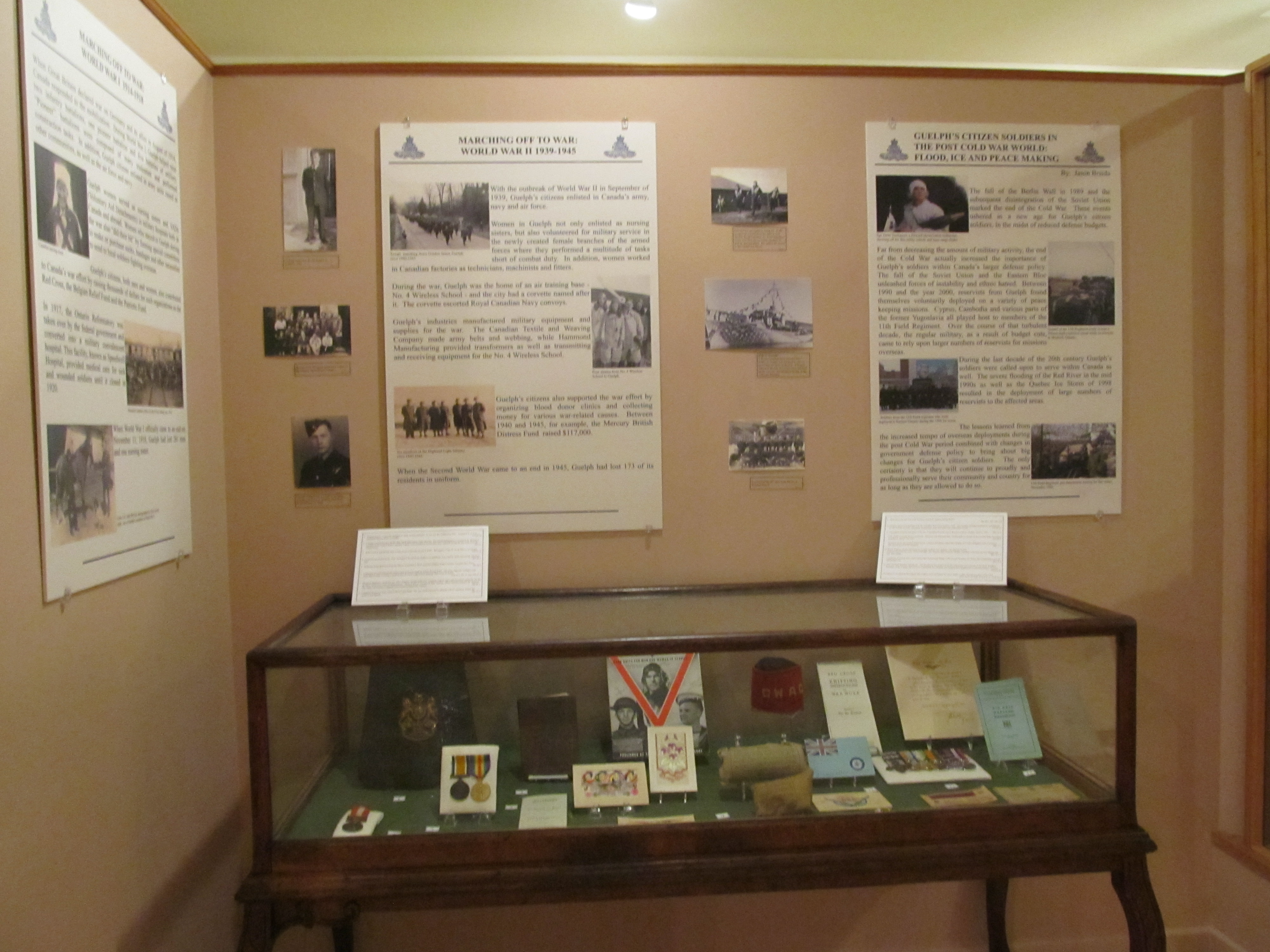
World War II artifacts on display at the Guelph Civic Museum.

The Guelph Civic Museum is a major attraction in Guelph. The story of Guelph from its earliest history to the present day is told through the many exhibits, interactive displays, special events, education programs, and programming for general visitors. The museum had many different aspects, including the permanent and changing exhibits, the programming room, and the meeting room. Behind the scenes, where regular visitors don't get to see them, is the artifact storage.

=== Exhibits ===
The Guelph Civic Museum contains approximately 40,000 artifacts. The collection is composed of photographs and many archival pieces, such as furniture, textiles, toys, and folk art. In addition, human history-related objects and decorative arts (such as pottery and tapestries) are also exhibited and stored by the museum. The museum has several galleries, including the Royal City Families Gallery, galleries for Guelph's local history, and two temporary exhibit spaces.

=== Admission ===
The admission fees for the Guelph Civic Museum are $5.00 for general admission. $15.00 Families (2 adults & up to 4 children maximum) Children under 4 years old are free.

Admission to the Guelph Civic Museum includes admission to McCrae House.

== Children's Museum ==
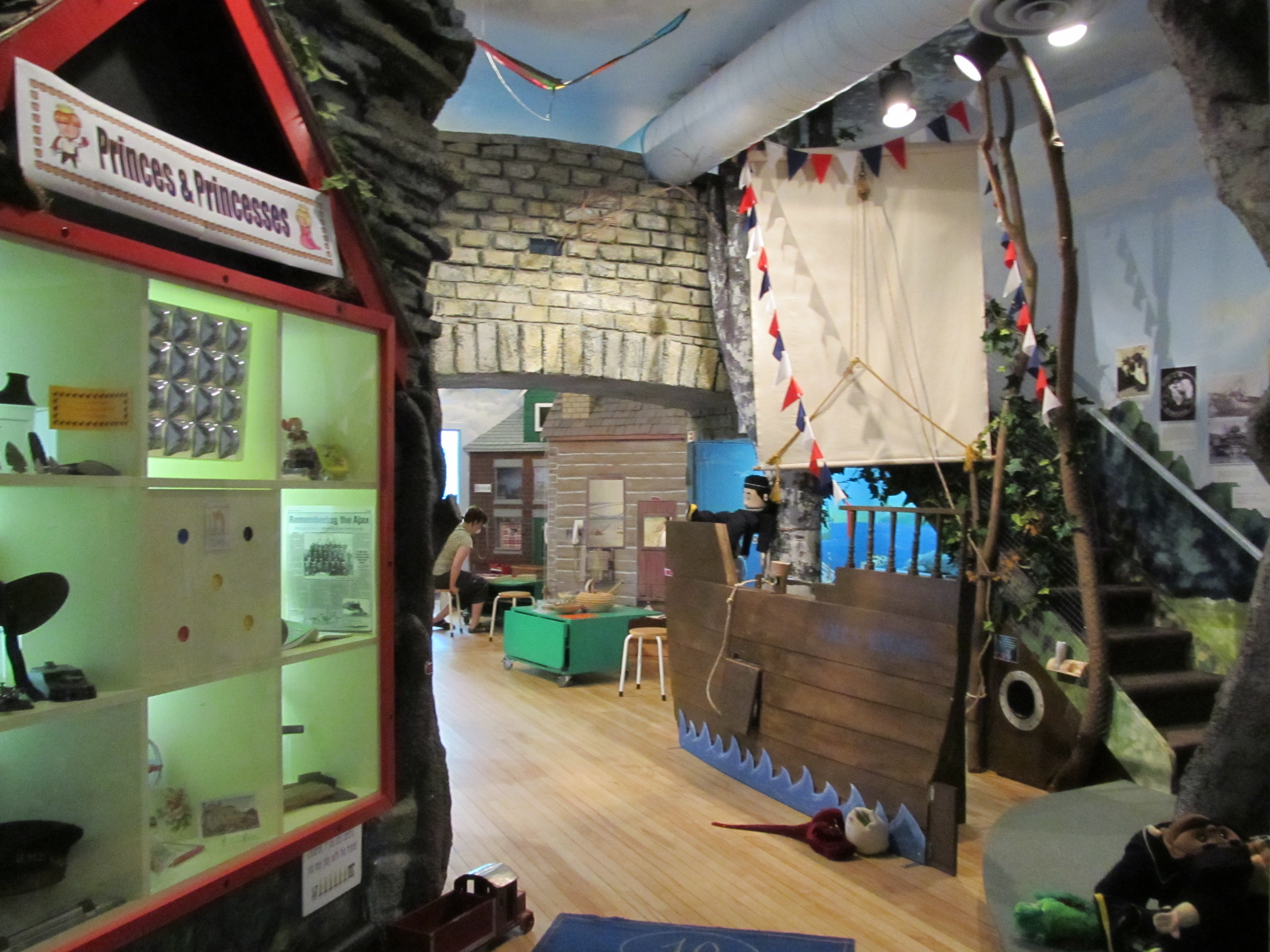
A look inside the Children's Museum just before it closed in June 2011.

The Rogers Yahoo! Hi-Speed Internet Growing Up in Guelph Children's Museum was found on the first floor of the Civic Museum's 6 Dublin Street location. It was designed and created by Vilnis Cultural Design Works and the museum staff after doing research and holding focus groups which involved children from local schools. The Children's Museum consists of interactive exhibits in an attempt to let children play and explore Guelph's history. It implements monthly themes on which some of the exhibits and events are based. In the Guelph Civic Museum's new home at the Loretto Convent, the Children's Museum is entitled the Royal City Families Gallery and has twice the space that it did at its Dublin Street location.

== Notable contributions ==
=== Administrative Staff ===
Staff as of 2019 includes:

- Tammy Adkin – Manager
- Dawn Owen - Curator
- Val Harrison – Supervisor, Visitor Experiences
- Luke Stempien – Collections Coordinator
- Ken Irvine - Education Coordinator
- Judi Prigione – Administration Coordinator
- Alex Jacobs-Blum - Indigenous Community Relations Coordinator
- Linda Fazzari - Bookings & Facility Rental Coordinator

=== Financial contributions ===
On September 21, 2010, Capital Campaign Chair John Valeriote announced a $200,000 donation from the estate of Hugh Guthrie, Q.C. Hugh Guthrie, an active and prominent community member who worked on the campaign until his death in June 2010. Hugh's donation prompted many other businesses and individuals to donate and allowed the campaign to surpass its goal of $500,000 by year-end. On March 24, 2011, John Valeriote announced that the campaign had raised $772,000, which was more than what was expected.

The following is a summary of other contributions (2010):

- City of Guelph: $564,260
- Provincial Government: Ministry of Culture, Community Museum Operating Grant (CMOG) $49,619
- Provincial Government: Summer Experience Program $2,445
- Federal Government: Young Canada Works $12,858
