= Lawrence Moore Cosgrave =

Canadian diplomat (1890–1971)

Lawrence Vincent Moore Cosgrave
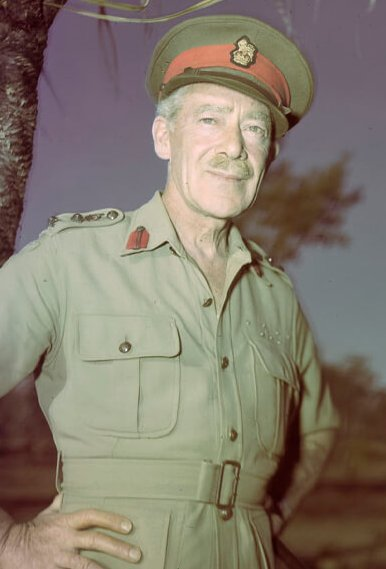
- Cosgrave as a Colonel in the Canadian Army
- Born: 28 August 1890; Toronto, Ontario, Canada
- Died: 28 July 1971 (aged 80); Knowlton, Quebec, Canada
- Military career
- Allegiance: Canada
- Branch: Canadian Militia; Canadian Expeditionary Force; Canadian Army
- Service years: 1912–1919, 1942–1946
- Rank: Colonel
- Conflicts: First World War (WIA): Second Battle of Ypres; Battle of Hill 70; Second World War: Pacific War
- Awards: Distinguished Service Order & Bar; Croix de Guerre (France); Mentioned in Despatches (3)
- Other work: Diplomat, trade commissioner

Colonel Lawrence Vincent Moore Cosgrave, DSO & Bar (28 August 1890 – 28 July 1971) was a Canadian soldier, author, diplomat and trade commissioner. He was the Canadian signatory to the Japanese Instrument of Surrender at the end of World War II.

A decorated veteran of World War I, Cosgrave was twice awarded the Distinguished Service Order. He worked as a trade diplomat between the wars. After the Pacific War broke out he served as the Canadian Military Attaché to Australia, for the South West Pacific Area.

== Early life ==
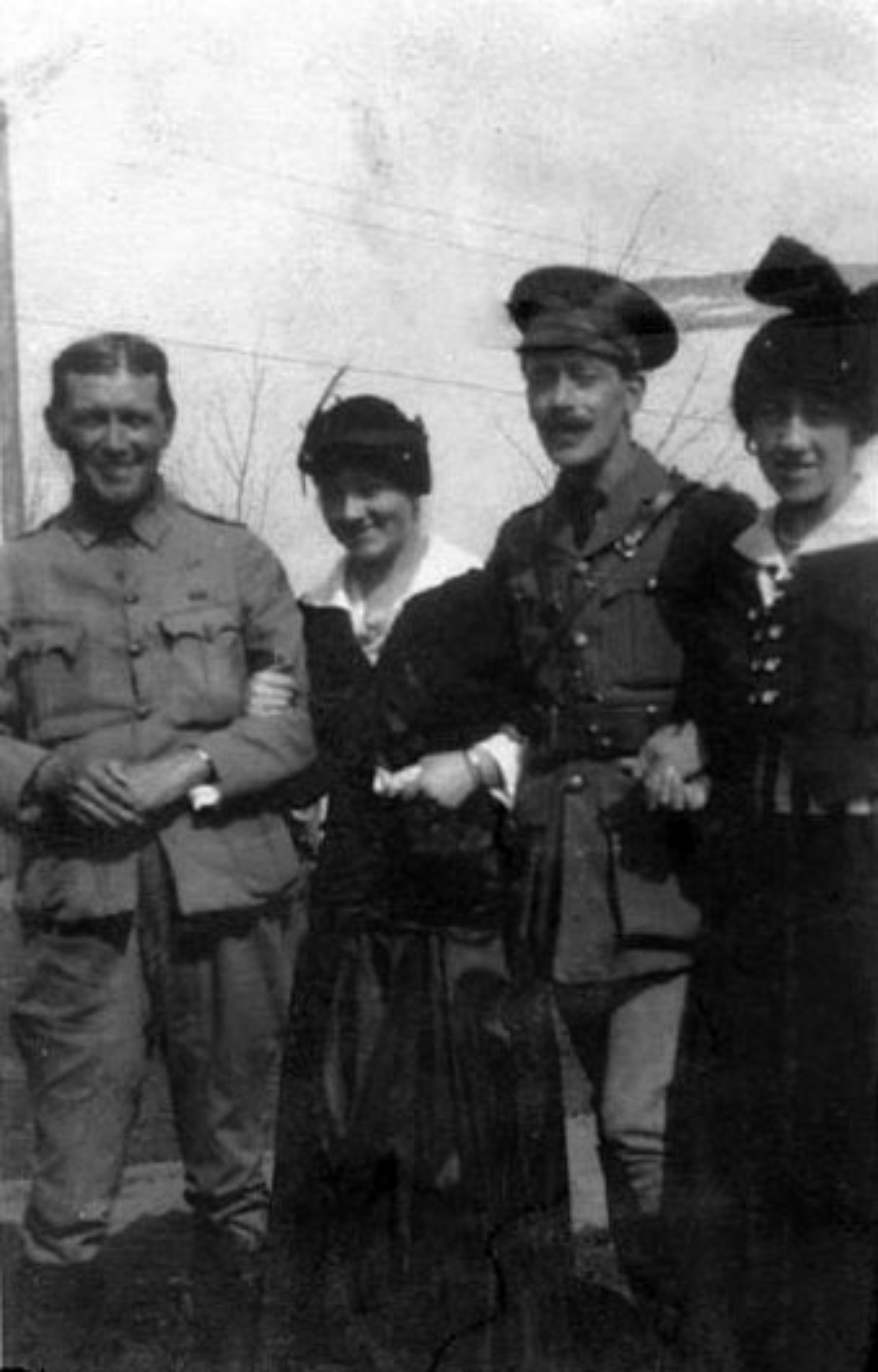
Cosgrave with John McCrae, 1912-1918

Lawrence Vincent Moore Cosgrave was born in Toronto, Ontario, on 28 August 1890. Cosgrave was the son of Lawrence J., founder of Cosgrave & Sons Brewery Company, and brother of James, a partner with E. P. Taylor in horse racing's Cosgrave Stables. He was a cousin of W. T. Cosgrave, who is considered to be Ireland's first Taoiseach.

Lawrence was a 1912 graduate of the Royal Military College of Canada, student # 851. (Note: RMC post-nominals are student numbers and/or Military Colleges Alumni club numbers. The numbers are sequential and meaningful to alumni. Honorary graduates start with an H. The earlier alumni were ranked by their examination scores and (only) top candidates would be offered a commission.) He subsequently attended McGill University. After he was commissioned as a militia artillery officer, he quickly befriended John McCrae, who was also an artillery officer from McGill.

== World War I ==
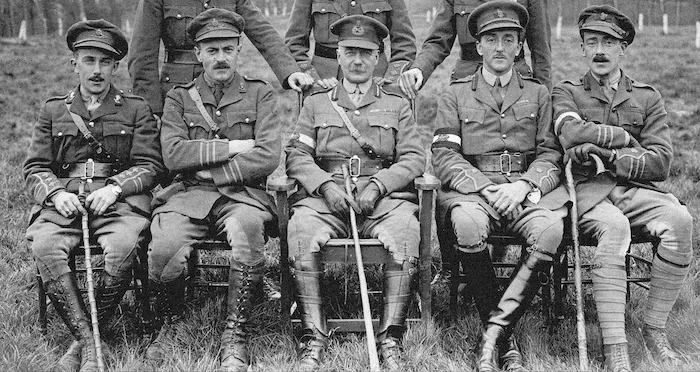
From right to left: Cosgrave, Alan Brooke, Edward Morrison and Andrew McNaughton during the First World War

When the First World War broke out, Cosgrave and McCrae volunteered for the Canadian Expeditionary Force together, and signed each other's attestation papers. Cosgrave, apparently signed McCrae's attestation on the wrong line.

He served as an artillery officer in the Canadian Field Artillery on the Western Front, where was wounded and blinded in one eye. Cosgrave was twice awarded the Distinguished Service Order, first in 1916 and again in 1918. His DSO bar citation reading:

For conspicuous gallantry and devotion to duty when a lorry in the middle of an ammunition convoy was blown up and six casualties occurred, he supervised the removal of the wounded under heavy shell fire by having the lorries nearest to the burning one removed, he minimised the effects of the second explosion when two more lorries blew up. He showed great courage and resource.

He fought at the Second Battle of Ypres alongside McCrae and Lieutenant Alexis Helmer. Later, Cosgrave was presented with the French Croix de Guerre. During the Battle of Hill 70, Cosgrave played a role in reconnaissance and intelligence that coordinated the elimination of German artillery, which contributed greatly to Canadian victory in the battle. His first DSO citation noted that he:

carried out several reconnaissances under very heavy fire, and explored the enemy's wire in daylight, displaying the greatest courage and ability throughout.

Cosgrave stated that his friend Lieutenant Colonel John McCrae wrote the poem "In Flanders Fields" in 20 minutes on a scrap of paper resting on Cosgrave's back. John Scott Cowan of the RMC, writes that this is the "most likely" account of the drafting of "In Flanders Fields." The poem was first published on 8 December 1915 in the London-based magazine Punch.

Cosgrave wrote the book Afterthoughts of Armageddon (Toronto: S.B. Gundy, 1919), about his experiences during World War I, and dedicated it to "the million dead". One article describes the book "as an account of the emotions Cosgrave and his comrades experienced in the years of grinding horror, poison gas and trench warfare". It was published by his wife Beryl (née Hunter Jones). Cosgrave ended the book with his thoughts when he heard children singing "Silent Night" in occupied Germany, the Christmas after the Armistice of 1918. He wrote:

at last, the world was safe for all the babes of the world — the coming splendid world — which, thank God and the men of to-day, would never again undergo the agony, the pain and the heart torture of another such Armageddon; and in the days to come — the hate, the loathing, the unutterable contempt, even the after-pity for a diseased band of nations such as Germany and her Allies, would never repeat itself. For if, as this soldier-man is convinced, the fighting men of this war have thought and found themselves likewise, then, since they are to be the moulders of the world's thought in the days that are upon us, the world will be as we some times picture it in our dreams — all happiness, content and joy, and Armageddon may, at long last, be blessed instead of cursed. And the million anxious dead of all the nations will rest tranquil and serene beyond the veil.

Cosgrave finished the war with the rank of lieutenant colonel at only 28. He was demobilized in 1919 and did not pursue an active military career.

== Service as a trade commissioner and diplomat ==
Between the wars Cosgrave served with the Trade and Commerce Department. Cosgrave worked in various consular posts, he then became a senior official with the Trade and Commerce Department and was Canadian trade commissioner in the Orient.

He was the Assistant Canadian Government Trade Commissioner in London from 1922 to 1924; Canadian Trade Commissioner at the British Empire Exhibition at Wembley Park in 1924; at Shanghai from 1925 to 1935; at Melbourne from 1935 to 1937; and at Sydney from 1937 to 1942.

Cosgrave's post as trade commissioner in Shanghai was according to Trade and Commerce second in importance only to London. He was the de facto ambassador, chief Canadian presence in China and an important figure in early Canada-China relations (Canada would not establish embassies until the 1940s). He made contacts with top ministers of the Nationalist regime in Nanjing, reorganized the trade office and "promoted Canadian prestige through a vast social and business network" in the Shanghai international community. He became a member of the illustrious Shanghai Club and joined the Shanghai Volunteer Corps. The North China Daily News drew a caricature of him and wrote:

If you haven't heard of Cosgrove [sic] on Canada you have missed coming under the influence of those men who, when they talk about their country and its ambitions, make you wish you had been born in their home town - or could go to it.

On April 29, 1932, during a celebration for the birthday of Emperor Hirohito in Shanghai, a Korean independence activist threw a bomb that killed or wounded several Japanese officials. Cosgrave, a bystander, came to the assistance and possibly saved the life of Mamoru Shigemitsu, who would become the Japanese Foreign Minister at the end of World War II.

Amid growing safety concerns in Shanghai due to political instability and conflict, along with the city's muggy weather, hectic living conditions, dirty streets, and artificial social life, Cosgrave requested reassignment and was transferred to Melbourne in 1934.

== World War II ==
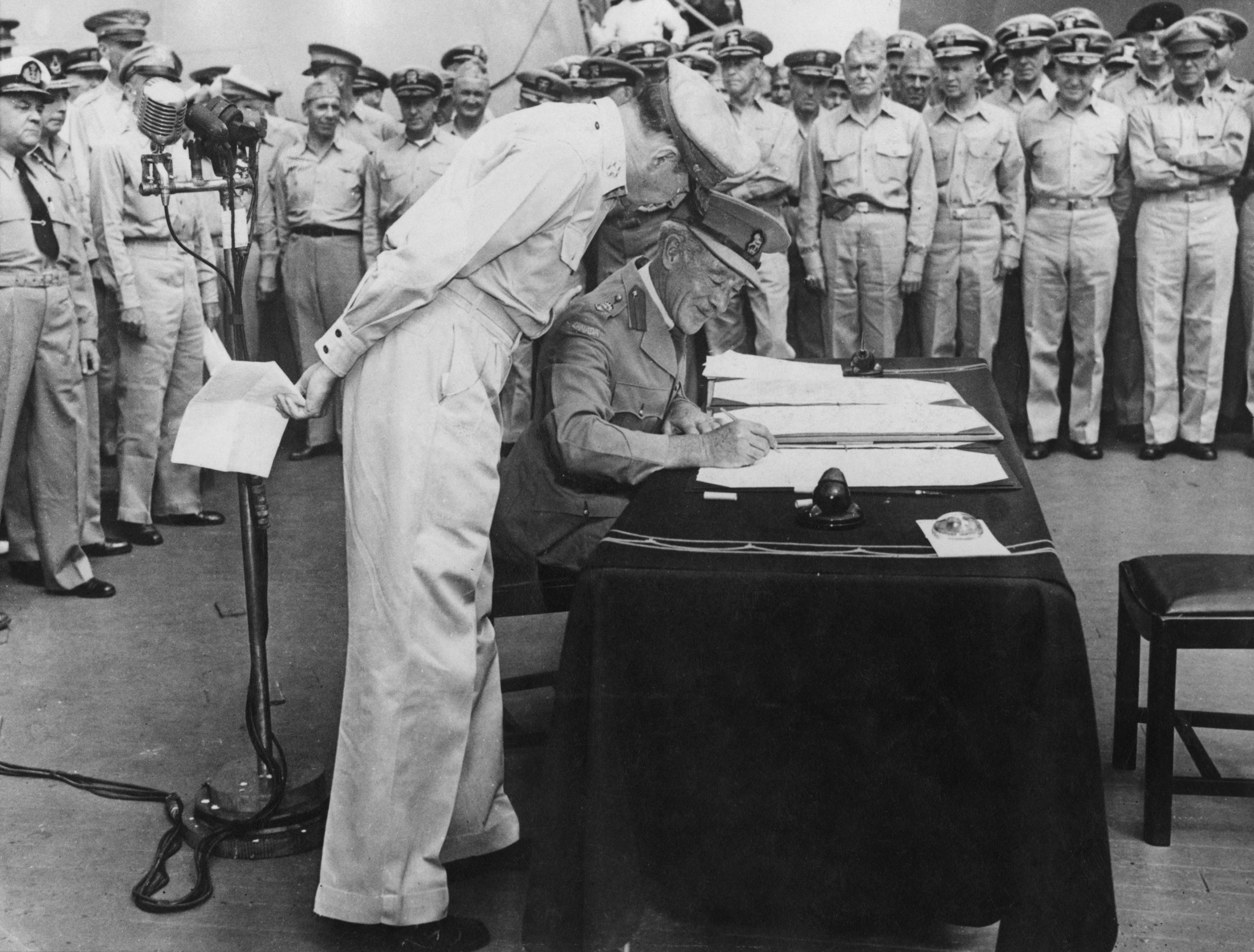
Cosgrave signing the Japanese Instrument of Surrender aboard the battleship USS Missouri in Tokyo Bay on 2 September 1945

Cosgrave returned to military service in 1942. During World War II he was the Canadian Military Attaché to Australia, for the South West Pacific Area. He was chosen as the Canadian representative at the official surrender of Japan and on 2 September 1945, signed the Japanese Instrument of Surrender on behalf of Canada aboard the battleship USS Missouri in Tokyo Bay. When his turn to sign came, Cosgrave inadvertently placed his signature one line too low on the Japanese copy of the documents, signing on the line for the French Republic. This was attributed to his being blind in one eye, through an injury sustained in the First World War.

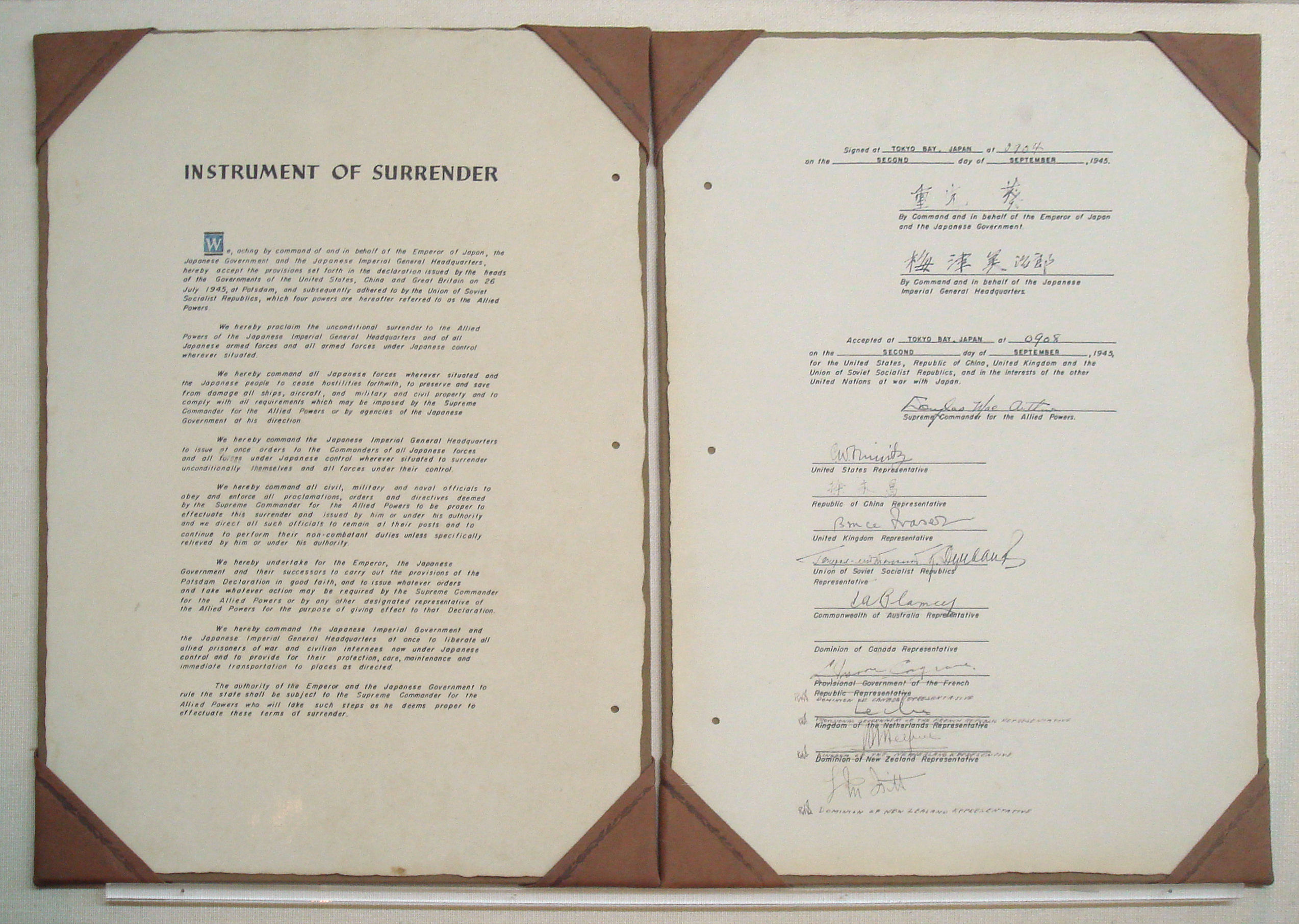
The Japanese Instrument of Surrender

The problem was easily corrected, by US General Richard Sutherland who crossed out "French Republic" and wrote in "Dominion of Canada" under Cosgrave's signature, then made similar corrections for the rest of the document. Air Vice-Marshal Leonard Monk Isitt, the Dominion of New Zealand representative, left without a blank to sign, had to have his name and country written in at the bottom margin of the document. The Japanese delegates accepted the corrected copy. Cosgrave did not repeat this error on the Allied copy.

Cosgrave knew Foreign Minister Mamoru Shigemitsu, who signed the instrument of surrender on behalf of the Japanese Emperor and Government, from their diplomatic days in Shanghai. It is reported that their eyes met when Mamoru Shigemitsu boarded the Missouri, they both smiled with mutual recognition, before Shigemitsu once more became stern and serious. They met each other again a number of years later in London at the Coronation of Elizabeth II in 1953.

== After the war ==
Cosgrave retired from the military in 1946 and began working for the Commerce Department again. He held various consular posts in Asia; and in the 1950s, his diplomatic career continued in European consular posts. He served as Chargé d'Affaires in Portugal from 1952 to 1955.

On 28 July 1971, Cosgrave died at his home in Knowlton (Eastern Townships), province of Quebec where he had previously settled. Decades after Cosgrave's death, social media of the Canadian armed forces, posted a series of tweets in September 2020, emphasizing the importance of his military career. They included these two: "Who among us was awarded two Distinguished Service Orders for gallantry in action during WWI?" and "Who among us was awarded a Croix de Guerre?".
