= Andrew McCrae =

Scottish footballer

Personal information
- Full name: Andrew Bowie McCrae
- Date of birth: 30 December 1886
- Place of birth: St Andrews, Scotland
- Date of death: 17 November 1915 (aged 28)
- Place of death: Gallipoli, Ottoman Turkey
- Position: Outside right

Senior career*
Years	Team	Apps	(Gls)
- Denny Athletic
1912–1913	Falkirk	5	(2)
1913–1914	Queen's Park	14	(0)
- * Club domestic league appearances and goals

Andrew Bowie McCrae (30 December 1886 – 17 November 1915) was a Scottish professional footballer who played in the Scottish League for Queen's Park and Falkirk as an outside right.

== Personal life ==
McCrae was educated at High School of Dundee, University of St Andrews and University of Dundee. He studied arts and law at the latter institution and later worked for solicitors Gair & Gibson in Falkirk. After the outbreak of the First World War, McCrae enlisted in the Lovat Scouts in September 1914 and was deployed to Gallipoli in September 1915. He had been serving as an acting corporal when he died of wounds suffered at Suvla on 17 November 1915. He was buried in Lala Baba Cemetery.

== Career statistics ==
Appearances and goals by club, season and competition
Club	Season	League			National Cup		Other		Total	
Club	Season	Division	Apps	Goals	Apps	Goals	Apps	Goals	Apps	Goals
Falkirk	1912–13	Scottish Division One	5	2	0	0	—		5	2
Queen's Park	1913–14	Scottish Division One	14	0	0	0	1 (Note: Appearance in Glasgow Cup)	0	15	0
Career total			19	2	0	0	1	0	20	2
