= MacRae =

MacRae or Macrae may refer to:

== People ==
=== Surname ===
- MacRae (surname)

=== Given name ===
- James Macrae Aitken (1908–1983), Scottish chess player
- Colin Macrae Ingersoll (1819–1903), U.S. Representative from Connecticut

== Other uses ==
- Clan MacRae, a Scottish clan
- LeBoeuf, Lamb, Greene & MacRae, a law firm
- MV Empire MacRae, a grain ship
- John Macrae Books, an imprint of Henry Holt and Company

== See also ==
- McRae (disambiguation)
- McCrae (disambiguation)
- McCrea (disambiguation)
