= McCluskie =

McCluskie is a surname. Notable people with the surname include:

- Gemma McCluskie (1983–2012), English actress
- Mike McCluskie (died 1871), American gambler and lawman
- Sam McCluskie (1932–1995), British politician

== See also ==
- McCluskieganj, a town in Jharkhand, India
- McCluskey
