= McCary =

McCary is a surname. Notable people with the surname include:

- Abigail McCary (born 1982), American beauty queen
- Dave McCary (born 1985), American filmmaker
- Michael McCary (born 1971), American singer
- William McCary (c. 1811–after 1854), American Latter Day Saint

== See also ==
- McCarey
