= McCloskey =

McCloskey (Irish: Mac Bhloscaidh) is an Irish surname.

The McCloskeys were the foremost sept of the O'Cahans, Lords of Keenaght, one of the leading clans of Cenél nEógain before the 16th century Scottish plantation. The progenitor of the clan was Bloscadh Ó Catháin, slayer of Muircheartach Ó Lochlainn, heir to the High Kingship of Ireland in 1196. The first recorded spelling of the family name is shown to be in Gaelic, that of Mac bhLoscaidh, from the All Ireland Census in 1659, conducted during the reign of Cromwell.

A typical variant spelling is that of McCluskey.

== Notable McCloskeys ==
- McCloskey (baseball), a 19th-century baseball player
- Bernard McCloskey, Northern Ireland judge
- C. John McCloskey, Catholic priest and member of Opus Dei
- Country McCloskey (fl. 1841–1850), American bare-knuckle boxer
- David McCloskey, American novelist and podcast host
- Deirdre McCloskey (born 1942), American economist
- Delamere Francis McCloskey (1897–1983), Canadian-born Los Angeles City Councilman
- Frank McCloskey (1939–2003), Indiana politician
- Gloria McCloskey (born 1935), All-American Girls Professional Baseball League player
- Henry John McCloskey (1925–2000), Australian moral philosopher
- Jack McCloskey (1925–2017), American basketball coach
- John McCloskey (1810–1885), Catholic archbishop
- Leigh McCloskey (born 1955), American actor
- Mark McCloskey and wife Patricia, a married couple, both attorneys, involved in the St. Louis gun-toting controversy
- Matthew McCloskey (1893–1973), Democratic Party fundraiser and US Ambassador to Ireland, father of Thomas McCloskey
- Paul McCloskey (born 1979), Irish boxer
- Pete McCloskey (1927–2024), American politician
- Robert McCloskey (1914–2003), American author and illustrator
- Robert J. McCloskey (1922–1996), American statesman and ambassador
- Stuart McCloskey Ulster and Ireland rugby union player
- Thomas McCloskey (1924–2004), Philadelphia construction magnate, son of Matthew McCloskey
- William George McCloskey (1823–1909), American Catholic Bishop

== See also ==
- McCloskey critique of economics
- McCluskey
- O'Cahan
- McCroskey
