= Glenelg River (Western Australia) =

Coordinates: 15°49′15″S 124°44′15″E

Location
- Country: Australia

Physical characteristics
- Source
  - location: Elizabeth and Catherine Range
  - elevation: 227 metres (745 ft)
- Mouth
  - location: Maitland Bay, Indian Ocean
  - elevation: sea level
- Length: 89 km (55 mi)

The Glenelg River is a river in the Kimberley region of Western Australia.

The headwaters of the river rise in the Elizabeth and Catherine Range. The river flows in a north-westerly direction past the Whately Range and discharges into Maitland Bay then through George Water, into Doubtful Bay and finally the Indian Ocean.

The McRae River is a tributary of the Glenelg River.

The first recorded exploration of the river was made in 1838, by a party led by George Grey, but they were poorly prepared and ill-equipped. Grey named the river on 2 March 1838 after Lord Glenelg who was Secretary of State for the Colonies from 1835 to 1839 and under whose auspices Grey undertook his explorations.

On 31 March 1929, en route from Sydney to England, the Southern Cross with Charles Kingsford Smith at the helm made an emergency landing on a mudflat near the mouth of the river. The Southern Cross was found and rescued after a fortnight's searching, with George Innes Beard, Albert Barunga and Wally from Kunmunya Mission the first overland party to reach the downed aircraft.
