= McClusky =

McClusky may refer to:

- McClusky (surname)
- McClusky, North Dakota, city in Sheridan County, North Dakota
- McClusky Municipal Airport
- USS McClusky (FFG-41), a United States Navy frigate

== See also ==
- Mclusky, Welsh rock band
