= McClusky (surname) =

McClusky is a surname. Notable people with the surname include:

- C. Wade McClusky (1902–1976), United States Navy aviator
- George W. McClusky (1861–1912), American police officer
- John V. McClusky, American astronomer
- Joseph McClusky, American politician
- Leigh McClusky, Australian journalist and presenter

== See also ==
- McCluskey
