= Judge McRae =

Judge McRae may refer to:

- Robert Malcolm McRae Jr. (1921–2004), judge of the United States District Court for the Western District of Tennessee
- William McRae (1909–1973), judge of the United States District Courts for the Middle and Southern Districts of Florida

== See also ==
- Justice McRae (disambiguation)
