= Justice McRae =

Justice McRae or Justice MacRae may refer to:

- Chuck McRae (born c. 1939), associate justice of the Supreme Court of Mississippi
- George W. MacRae (1802–1858), associate justice of the Territorial Florida Supreme Court
- James C. MacRae (1838–1909), associate justice of the North Carolina Supreme Court
- Thomas Chipman McRae (1851–1929), special chief justice of the Arkansas Supreme Court

== See also ==
- Judge McRae (disambiguation)
