= Stephen Cluskey =

- Born: 4 June 1984 (age 42)
- Television: The Late Late Show
- Relatives: James Cluskey(brother)
- Awards: Social Justice Award, Social Entrepreneur of Ireland, Nissan Generation Next Ambassador

Stephen Cluskey (born 4 June 1984) is a social entrepreneur and advocate for people with accessible needs from Swords, County Dublin, Ireland. He is the middle child of three, to parents Kevin and Esme, and brother of James Cluskey. After attending St Colmcilles boys National School in Swords, he then went to Belvedere College in Dublin city centre.

== Accident ==
At the age of 18, Cluskey was about to enter into his leaving certificate year in Belvedere College when he had a catastrophic spinal cord injury. Cluskey was out camping with friends and fell from a hay bale, breaking his neck at the C2, C3, C4 and C5 levels. He was taken to the Mater Private Hospital in Dublin and later transferred to the National Rehabilitation Hospital in Dún Laoghaire to undergo physical and occupational therapy.

== Advocacy work ==
Cluskey has been involved in a number of disability related advocacy actions. In 2013, after getting stranded on a night out trying to get a wheelchair accessible taxi, he lobbied the government and was appointed by Minister Alan Kelly to the taxi advisory committee and by current Irish Taoiseach prime minister Leo Varadkar to help put more wheelchair accessible taxis on Irish roads.

In April 2017, Cluskey was invited to appear on the Irish chat show The Late Late Show. As part of the segment, he was joined by TV presenter Kathryn Thomas and ex-Irish international football star Kevin Kilbane who both undertook a challenge to experience life in a wheelchair. Before this, he had devised Rugbys Wheelchair Challenge, which challenged Irish rugby stars Jamie Heaslip, Shane Byrne, Felix Jones and David Wallace to travel from the Aviva Stadium in Dublin to Thomond Park in Limerick and aired on the Irish national broadcaster TV3. The show was produced by Loosehorse productions and went on to be nominated for an IFTA award for Best Reality TV Show.

Stephen is now co-founder of Mobility Mojo, a Saas company which makes 'Hotel Accessibility Simple'. The company works with hotels to highlight their accessibility features and showcase the vital information needed for those with a hearing, visual or mobility impairment.

Stephen spoke at two global hospitality events in 2019, Skift Europe Forum and Skift Global Forum, about the value of accessible tourism in the world today.

== Awards and honours ==
In 2016 Cluskey received a Social Entrepreneurs of Ireland award for his co-founded social enterprise Mobility Mojo. He was awarded a Social Justice Award from Belvedere College in 2016 and a David Manley Emerging Social Entrepreneur award in 2014. Nissan Ireland made Cluskey a Nissan Generation Next Ambassador for 2016 - 2017.
