= McRae River (Western Australia) =

River in Western Australia

Coordinates: 16°46.254′S 124°53.821′E

Location
- Country: Australia

Physical characteristics
- Source
  - location: Whately Range
  - elevation: 168 metres (551 ft)
- Mouth
  - location: Glenelg River
  - elevation: 7 metres (23 ft)
- Length: 35 km (22 mi)

The McRae River is a river in the Kimberley region of Western Australia.

The river rises in the Whately Range and flows in a northerly direction through the Prince Regent National Park until it discharges into the Glenelg River.

It was first located on 14 May 1865 by a party led by government Assistant Surveyor James Cowle, during an exploration expedition from Camden Harbour to the south of the Glenelg River. It was named after one of the exploration party, Camden Harbour Pastoral Association member Alexander Joseph McRae, who had sailed from Melbourne to settle the region.
