= Alexis Helmer =

Canadian soldier

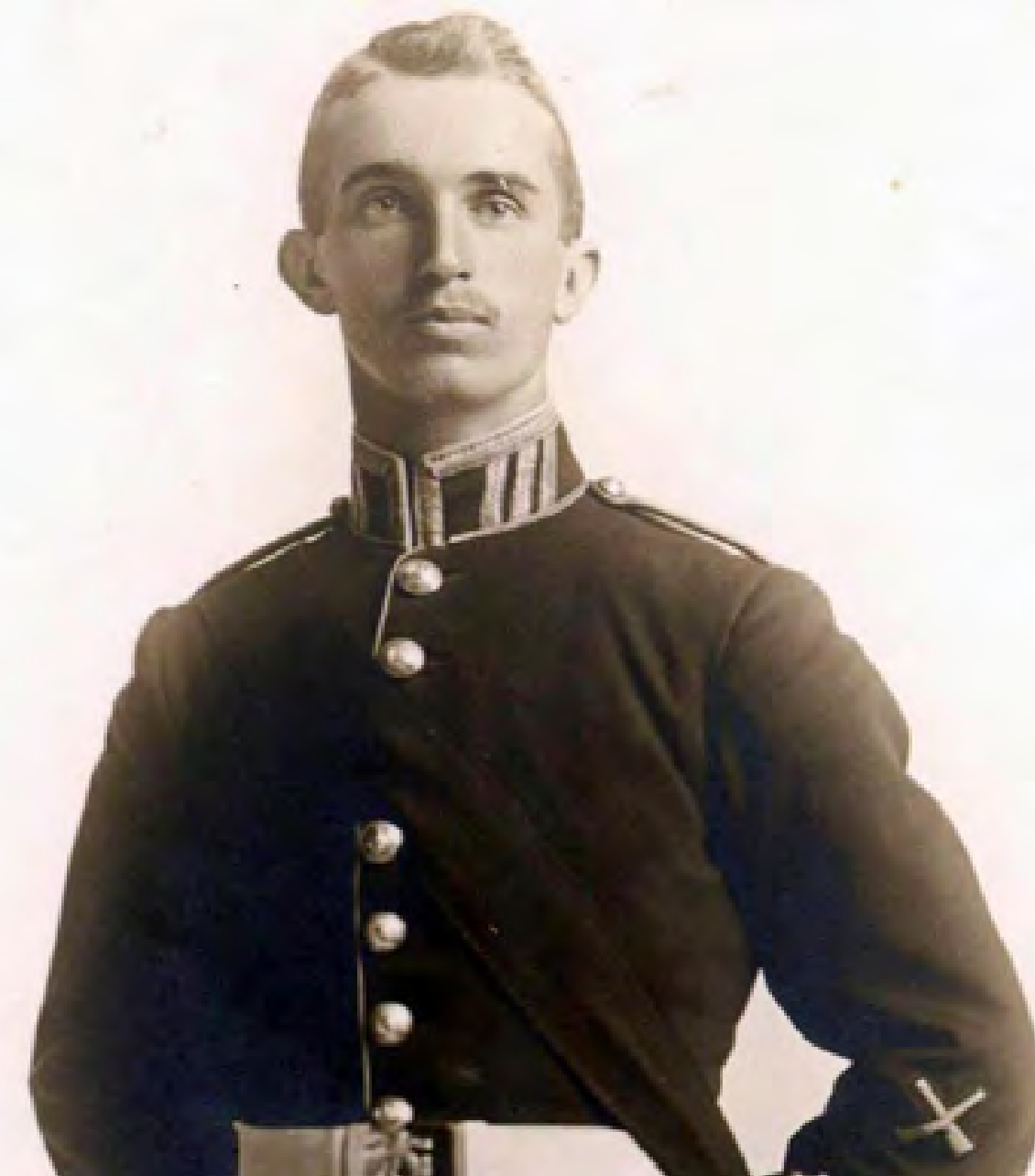
- No. 841 Lieutenant Alexis Helmer, of the RMC Class of 1912
- Born: Alexis Hannum Helmer; 29 June 1892; Hull, Quebec, Canada
- Died: 2 May 1915 (aged 22); Ypres, Belgium
- Burial place: commemorated on the Menin Gate
- Relatives: BGen. Richard Alexis Helmer (father)
- Military career
- Allegiance: Canada
- Branch: Canadian Expeditionary Force
- Service years: 1912–1915
- Rank: Lieutenant
- Units: 1st Brigade, Canadian Field Artillery
- Conflicts: First World War: Second Battle of Ypres

Alexis Hannum Helmer (29 June 1892 – 2 May 1915) was killed in battle during the Great War while serving with the 2nd Battery, 1st Brigade, Canadian Field Artillery. He is known as being part of the inspiration for "In Flanders Fields" through his friendship with John McCrae.

== Early life ==
Helmer was born on June 29, 1892, in Hull, Quebec, the son of Brigadier General Richard Alexis Helmer and Elizabeth I. Helmer, of Ottawa.

Helmer came from a loyalist military family, originally from Williamsburg, Dundas County. He served as a major in the 43rd Ottawa and Carleton Rifles, the same regiment his uncle, William Z. Helmer, had served in as a Captain during the Fenian Raids. His grandfather, Richard Helmer, served in the 1st Dundas Militia during the Rebellions of 1837–1838, his great grandfather, Johannes Pillar, served in the Dundas Militia during the War of 1812, and his other great grandfather, John Philip Helmer, served in the 1st KRRNY during the American Revolution.

Helmer attended Ottawa Collegiate Institute, and then the Royal Military College of Canada, graduating as an artillery officer in 1912. He was also an engineer.

== Great War and death ==
He enlisted August 27, 1914 in the Canadian Field Artillery.

He was killed in the Second Battle of Ypres on 2 May 1915. From the Canadian Virtual War Memorial:

The following circumstances of his death have been compiled from letters received by Lieut Owen Carsley Frederic Hague's father, Frederic Hague from officers in the area at the time. Early on Sunday morning, May 2, 1915 Lieutenants' Hague and Helmer left their position to check on a Canadian Battery who had positioned themselves on the bank of the Yser Canal near St. Julien close to the France-Belgium border. They had only gone a few yards when a six inch, high explosive canon shell burst. Lieutenant Helmer was killed instantly.

== In Flanders Fields ==
"In Flanders Fields" is a war poem in the form of a rondeau, written during the First World War by Canadian physician Lieutenant-Colonel John McCrae. He was inspired to write it on May 3, 1915, after presiding over the funeral of friend and fellow soldier Lieutenant Alexis Helmer, at which time he noted how poppies quickly grew around the graves of those who died at Ypres. The next day, he composed the poem while sitting in the back of an ambulance at an Advanced Dressing Station outside Ypres. This location is today known as the John McCrae Memorial Site.

Cyril Allinson was a sergeant major in McCrae's unit. While delivering the brigade's mail, he watched McCrae as he worked on the poem, noting that McCrae's eyes periodically returned to Helmer's grave as he wrote. When handed the notepad, Allinson read the poem and was so moved he immediately committed it to memory. He described it as being "almost an exact description of the scene in front of us both". According to legend, McCrae was not satisfied with his work. It is said he crumpled the paper and threw it away. It was retrieved by a fellow member of his unit, either Edward Morrison or J. M. Elder, or Allinson. McCrae was convinced to submit the poem for publication. An early copy of the poem is found in the diary of Clare Gass, who was serving with McCrae as a battlefield nurse, in an entry dated October 30, 1915—nearly six weeks before the poem's first publication in the magazine Punch on December 8, 1915.

Another story of the poem's origin is that Helmer's funeral was held on the morning of May 2, after which McCrae wrote the poem in 20 minutes. A third version, by Morrison, was that McCrae worked on the poem as time allowed between arrivals of wounded soldiers in need of medical attention. Regardless of its true origin, McCrae worked on the poem for months before considering it ready for publication. He submitted it to The Spectator in London but it was rejected. It was then sent to Punch, where it was published on December 8, 1915. It was published anonymously, but Punch attributed the poem to McCrae in its year-end index.

== Memorial ==
A memorial is dedicated to the memory of Lieutenant Alexis Hannum Helmer who was killed in action during the Great War and was part of the inspiration for "In Flanders Fields" in the Memorial Hall of his high school alma mater Lisgar Collegiate Institute in Ottawa, Ontario. Unveiled in 2001, the plaque was erected by the Lisgar Alumni Association.

He is also memorialised on panel 10 of the Menin Gate Memorial.

Commemorated on page 18 of the First World War Book of Remembrance in the Peace Tower, Ottawa, Ontario, Canada.
