= McCluskey =

McCluskey is a surname; a variant of McCloskey. It is derived from the Irish Mac Bhloscaidh. Notable people with the surname include:

- Andy McCluskey (born 1959), singer
- Conn McCluskey (1914–2013), Irish civil-rights activist
- C. Wade McClusky (1902–1976), American admiral
- Dorothy McCluskey (died 2013), American politician and conservationist
- Edward J. McCluskey (1929–2016), electrical engineer
- George McCluskey (born 1957), Scottish footballer
- Harold McCluskey (1912–1987), radiation survivor
- Jamie McCluskey (born 1987), Scottish footballer
- Jill McCluskey, American economist
- Jim McCluskey (1950–2013), Scottish football referee
- Joe McCluskey (1911–2002), American athlete
- John McCluskey, Baron McCluskey (1929–2017), Scottish lawyer, judge and politician
- John McCluskey (boxer) (1944–2015), Scottish boxer of the 1960s and '70s
- Len McCluskey (born 1950), a British trade unionist
- Pat McCluskey (born 1952), Scottish footballer
- Roger McCluskey (1930–1993), American race-car driver
- Ronnie McCluskey (1936–2011), Scottish footballer
- Stuart McCluskey (born 1977), Scottish footballer
- Su McCluskey, Australian agriculture advocate

== Fictional characters ==
- Karen McCluskey, Desperate Housewives character
- Mona McCluskey, American sitcom
- Mrs. Bridget McCluskey, Grange Hill character played by Gwyneth Powell
- Captain Mark McCluskey, corrupt Irish-American police captain played by Sterling Hayden in The Godfather
- Gator McKlusky, character played by Burt Reynolds in the movies White Lightning and Gator

== See also ==
- McCluskie
- McCloskey
- McClusky (disambiguation)
