= Governor McRae =

Governor McRae may refer to:

- John J. McRae (1815–1868), 21st Governor of Mississippi
- Thomas Chipman McRae (1851–1929), 26th Governor of Arkansas
