= McCarey =

McCarey is a surname. Notable people with the surname include:

- Aaron McCarey (born 1992), Irish footballer
- Kevin McCarey, American filmmaker and author
- Leo McCarey (1898–1969), American film director, screenwriter, and producer
- Ray McCarey (1904–1948), American film director

== See also ==
- McCary
