= John McCrae =

Canadian poet and physician (1872–1918)

Lieutenant-Colonel John McCrae
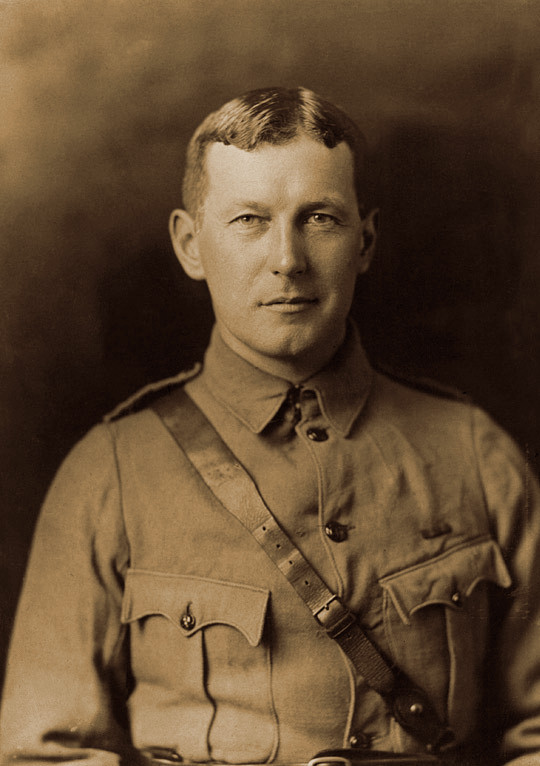
- McCrae c. 1914
- Born: November 30, 1872; Guelph, Ontario, Canada
- Died: January 28, 1918 (aged 45); Boulogne-sur-Mer, France
- Education: Ontario Agricultural College; University of Toronto
- Military Service
- Allegiance: Canada
- Branch: Canadian Militia; Canadian Expeditionary Force
- Service years: 1887-1918
- Rank: Gunner; Lieutenant; Lieutenant Colonel
- Units: Guelph Field Artillery (1887-99) 'D' Battery, CFA (1900); 1st Brigade, CFA (1914-15); Canadian Army Medical Corps (1916-1918)
- Conflicts: Second Boer War: Battle of Belfast; Battle of Leliefontein; First World War: Second Battle of Ypres; Western Front
- Occupations: Poet, physician, author, lieutenant colonel of the Canadian Expeditionary Force
- Known for: Author of "In Flanders Fields"
- Relatives: Thomas McCrae (brother); Geills Turner (great-niece); David Kilgour (great-nephew)

Lieutenant-Colonel John McCrae (November 30, 1872 – January 28, 1918) was a Canadian poet, physician, author, artist and soldier during World War I and a surgeon during the Second Battle of Ypres, in Belgium. He is best known for writing the famous war memorial poem "In Flanders Fields", penned in the battlefields of Ypres in May 1915, after the burial of a friend. McCrae died of pneumonia near the end of the war. His famous poem is a threnody, a genre of lament.

== Biography ==
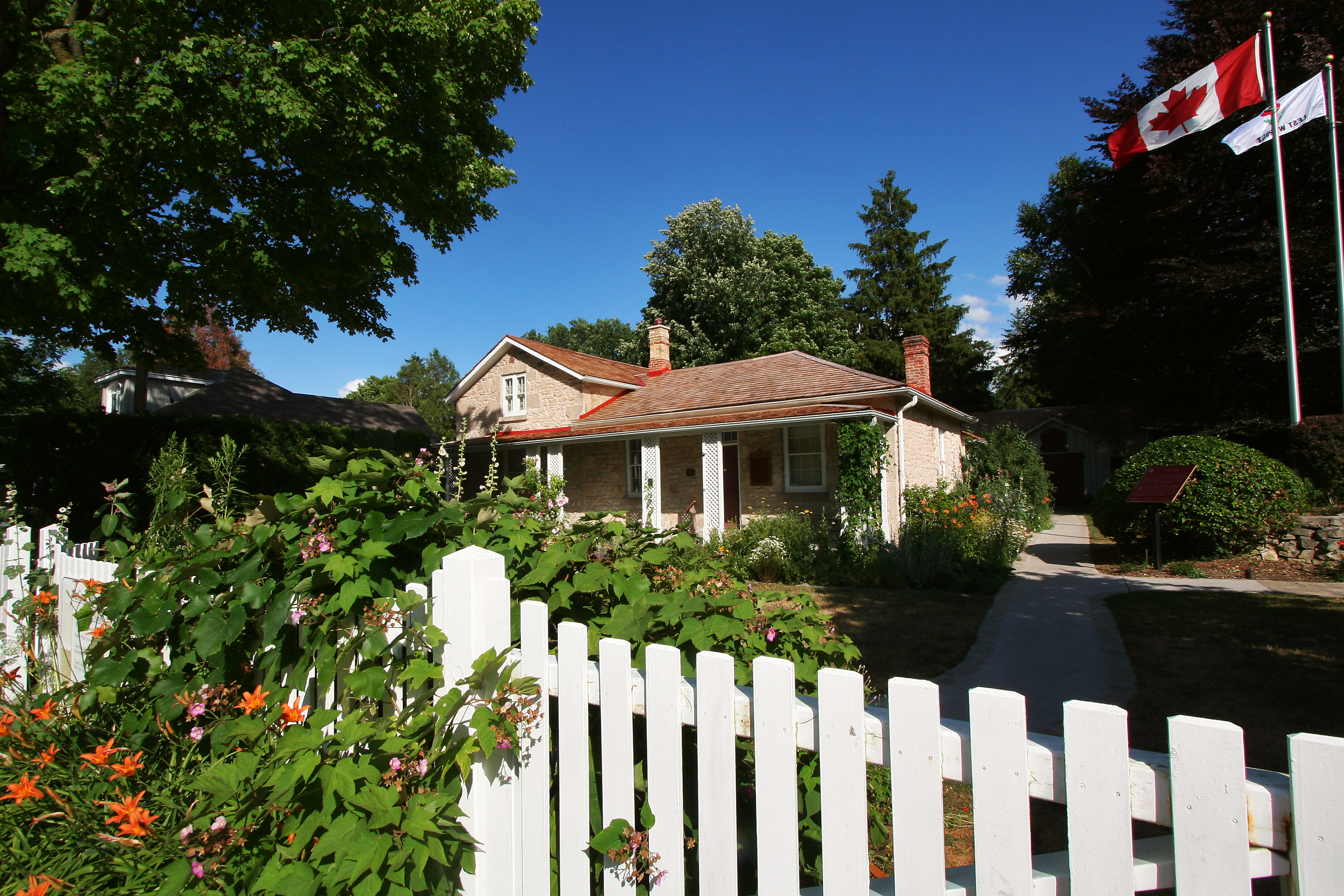
McCrae's birthplace, McCrae House in Guelph, Ontario

McCrae was born in McCrae House in Guelph, Ontario to Lieutenant-Colonel David McCrae and Janet Simpson Eckford; he was the grandson of Scottish immigrants from Balmaghie, Kirkcudbrightshire. His father had served with the Guelph Home Guard during the Fenian raids, and was a member of the Guelph city council and a director of The North American Life Assurance Company. His brother, Dr. Thomas McCrae, became a professor of medicine at Johns Hopkins Medical School in Baltimore and close associate of Sir William Osler. His sister Geills married James Kilgour, a justice of the Court of King's Bench of Manitoba, and moved to Winnipeg.

McCrae attended the Guelph Collegiate Vocational Institute and graduated from the Institute at 16. He was the first Guelph student to win a scholarship to the University of Toronto. After attending university for three years, however, he was forced to take a year off due to severe asthma. This illness recurred throughout his life.

Among his papers in the John McCrae House in Guelph is a letter he wrote on July 18, 1893, to Laura Kains while he trained as an artilleryman at Tête-de-Pont barracks, today's Fort Frontenac, in Kingston, Ontario. "I have a manservant ... Quite a nobby place it is, in fact ... My windows look right out across the bay, and are just near the water's edge; there is a good deal of shipping at present in the port; and the river looks very pretty."

He was a resident master in English and Mathematics in 1894 at the Ontario Agricultural College in Guelph. McCrae returned to University College at the University of Toronto and completed his B.A., then returned again to study medicine at the University of Toronto Faculty of Medicine on a scholarship.

At medical school, McCrae had tutored other students to help pay his tuition. Two of his students were among the first female doctors in Ontario.

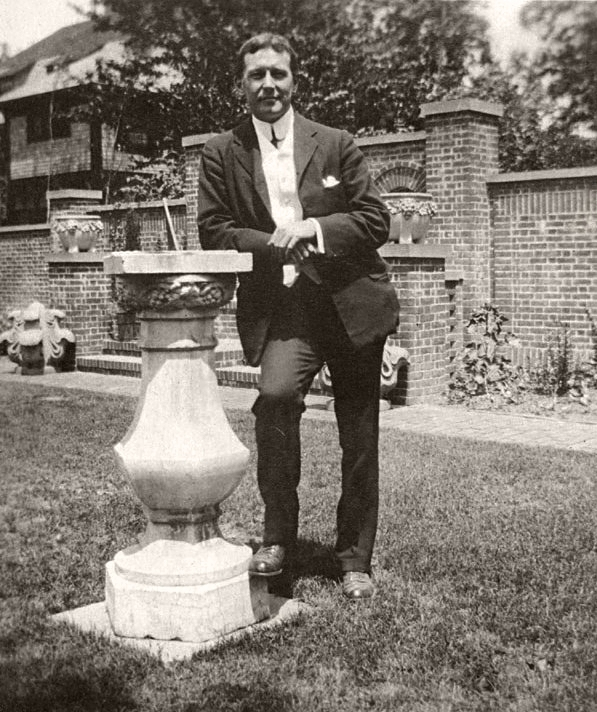
John McCrae in 1912

McCrae graduated in 1898. He was first a resident house-officer at Toronto General Hospital, then in 1899 at Johns Hopkins Hospital in Baltimore, Maryland.

In 1901, he was appointed professor of pathology at the University of Vermont, where he taught until 1911; he also taught at McGill University in Montreal, Quebec. In 1902, he was appointed resident pathologist at Montreal General Hospital and later became assistant pathologist to the Royal Victoria Hospital in Montreal. In 1904, he was appointed an associate in medicine at the Royal Victoria Hospital. Later that year, he went to England where he studied for several months and became a member of the Royal College of Physicians.

In 1905, McCrae set up his own practice although he continued to work and lecture at several hospitals. The same year, he was appointed pathologist to the Montreal Foundling and Baby Hospital. In 1908, he was appointed physician to the Alexandra Hospital for Contagious Diseases.

In 1910, he accompanied Lord Grey, the Governor General of Canada, on a canoe trip to Hudson Bay to serve as expedition physician. Lord Grey marvelled that "You were able to beat the record of the Arabian Nights, for I believe the 3000 miles of our travels were illumined by as many stories."

McCrae was the co-author, with J. G. Adami, of a medical textbook, A Text-Book of Pathology for College Students of Medicine (1912; 2nd ed., 1914).

McCrae was the founding member of the University Club of Montreal.

McCrae proposed to his sister-in-law Nona Gwyn but was refused. Apart from weekly letters to his mother the poet was very private about any romantic relationships. In 2011, McCrae's sexuality was questioned by staff of the Bytown Museum, causing some controversy. The Museum’s director of development later referred questions about the theory to Ottawa historian Glenn Wright, who denied involvement and said the idea had been presented to him by a museum curator. According to McCrae biographer John F. Prescott and McCrae House curator Bev Dietrich, there is no evidence that McCrae was gay.

== Early military service ==
McCrae's father, Lt-Col. David McCrae, a Fenian Raid veteran, organized and commanded the Guelph Field Artillery from the 1870s-1890s, and in 1887, John McCrae joined his father's unit as a Bugler and then as a Gunner. He had previously joined the Guelph Highland Cadet Corps in 1886 at age 14, being awarded a prize as the best cadet in Ontario in 1887.

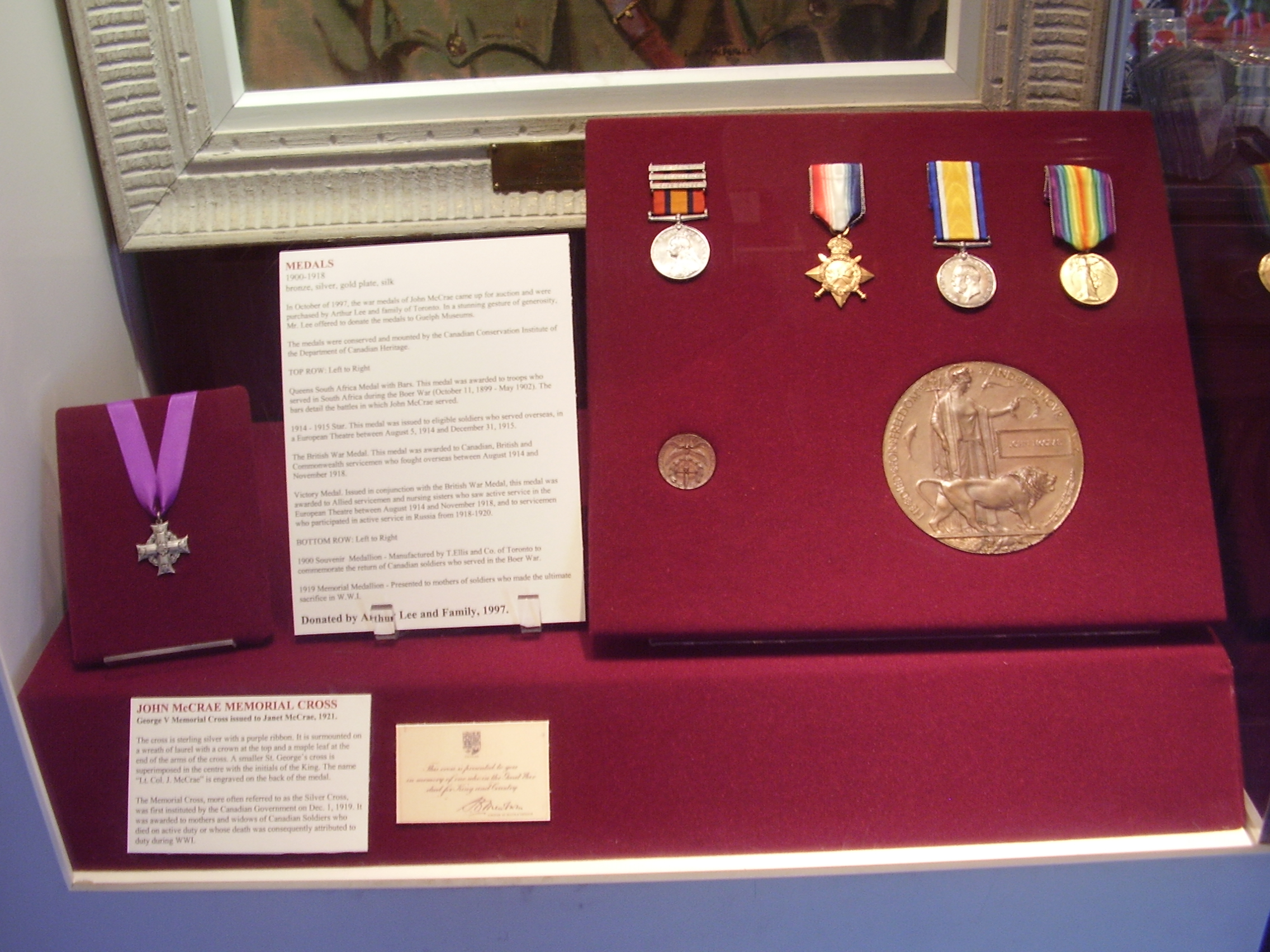
McCrae's medals for the Boer War and First World War

McCrae continued to serve in the militia in the 1890s, being appointed Quarter-Master Sergeant of the Guelph Artillery in 1891, and then Lieutenant in 1896.

In December 1899, McCrae volunteered for active service in South Africa as a Lieutenant in 'D' Battery, Canadian Field Artillery during the Second Boer War. McCrae was placed in charge of No. 2 (right) section, 'D' Battery, while his friend Edward Morrison commanded No. 1 Section. They arrived in Cape Town in February 1900, and fought in skirmishes in the Orange Free State and the Transvaal, including the Carnarvon Expedition and at the Battle of Belfast in August 1900. McCrae returned home in late 1900. For his service in the war, he was awarded the Queen's South Africa Medal with three clasps.

In 1901, he was promoted to Captain in the 16th Battery, Canadian Field Artillery, and then to Major of the 1st Artillery Brigade in 1902. In 1904 he resigned his active militia position and was placed on the reserve of officers as a Major.

== First World War ==
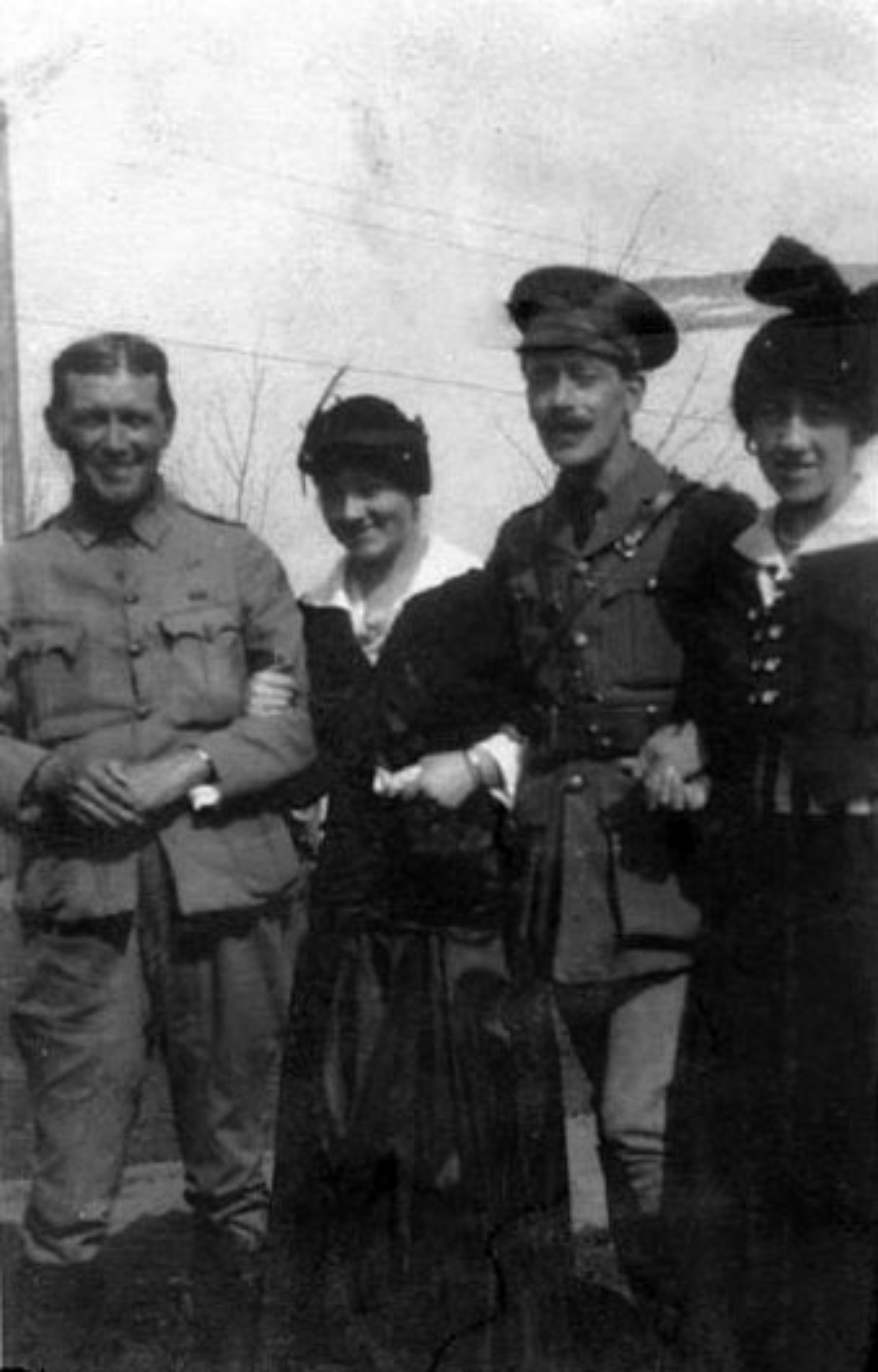
John McCrae (left) with his friend Lawrence Moore Cosgrave (right), 1912-1918

When Britain declared war on Germany because of the latter's invasion of neutral Belgium at the beginning of the First World War (1914), Canada, as a Dominion within the British Empire, was at war as well. McCrae volunteered for service at age 41. He wrote a friend, "I am really rather afraid, but more afraid to stay at home with my conscience." He was appointed as Medical Officer and Major of the 1st Brigade, Canadian Field Artillery. He treated the wounded during the Second Battle of Ypres in 1915, from a hastily dug 8-by-8-foot (2.4 m × 2.4 m) bunker in the back of the dyke along the Yser Canal about 2 miles north of Ypres. McCrae's friend and former militia member, Lt. Alexis Helmer, was killed in the battle, and his burial inspired the poem, "In Flanders Fields", which was written on May 3, 1915.

From June 1, 1915, McCrae was ordered away from the artillery to set up No. 3 Canadian General Hospital (McGill) at Dannes-Camiers near Boulogne-sur-Mer, northern France. For eight months the hospital operated in Durbar tents (donated by the Begum of Bhopal and shipped from India), but after suffering from storms, floods, and frosts it was moved in February 1916 into the old Jesuit College in Boulogne-sur-Mer. C. L. C. Allinson reported that McCrae "most unmilitarily told [me] what he thought of being transferred to the medicals and being pulled away from his beloved guns. His last words to me were: 'Allinson, all the goddamn doctors in the world will not win this bloody war: what we need is more and more fighting men.'"

"In Flanders Fields" first appeared anonymously in Punch on December 8, 1915, but in the index to that year, McCrae was named as the author (misspelt as McCree). The verses swiftly became one of the most popular poems of the war, used in countless fund-raising campaigns and frequently translated (a Latin version begins In agro belgico...). "In Flanders Fields" was also extensively printed in the United States, whose government was contemplating joining the war, alongside a 'reply' by R. W. Lillard ("... Fear not that you have died for naught, / The torch ye threw to us we caught ...").

McCrae, now "a household name, albeit a frequently misspelt one", regarded his sudden fame with some amusement, wishing that "they would get to printing 'In F.F.' correctly: it never is nowadays"; but (writes his biographer) "he was satisfied if the poem enabled men to see where their duty lay."

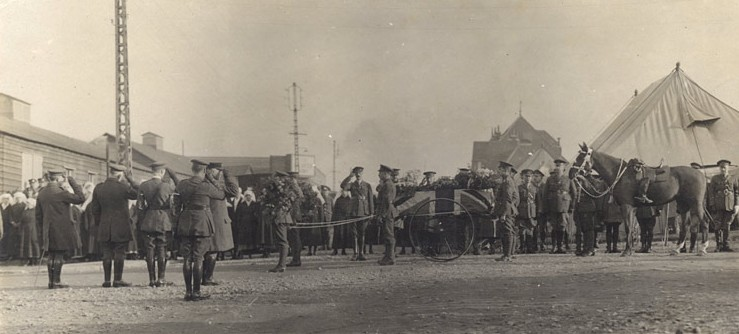
McCrae's funeral

On January 28, 1918, while still commanding No. 3 Canadian General Hospital (McGill) at Boulogne, McCrae died of pneumonia with "extensive pneumococcus meningitis" at the British General Hospital in Wimereux, France. He was buried the following day in the Commonwealth War Graves Commission section of Wimereux Cemetery, just a couple of kilometres up the coast from Boulogne, with full military honours. His flag-draped coffin was borne on a gun carriage and the mourners – who included general Sir Arthur Currie and many of McCrae's friends and staff – were preceded by McCrae's charger, "Bonfire", with McCrae's boots reversed in the stirrups. Bonfire was with McCrae from Valcartier, Quebec until his death and was much loved. McCrae's gravestone is placed flat, as are all the others in the section, because of the unstable sandy soil.

== "In Flanders Fields" ==
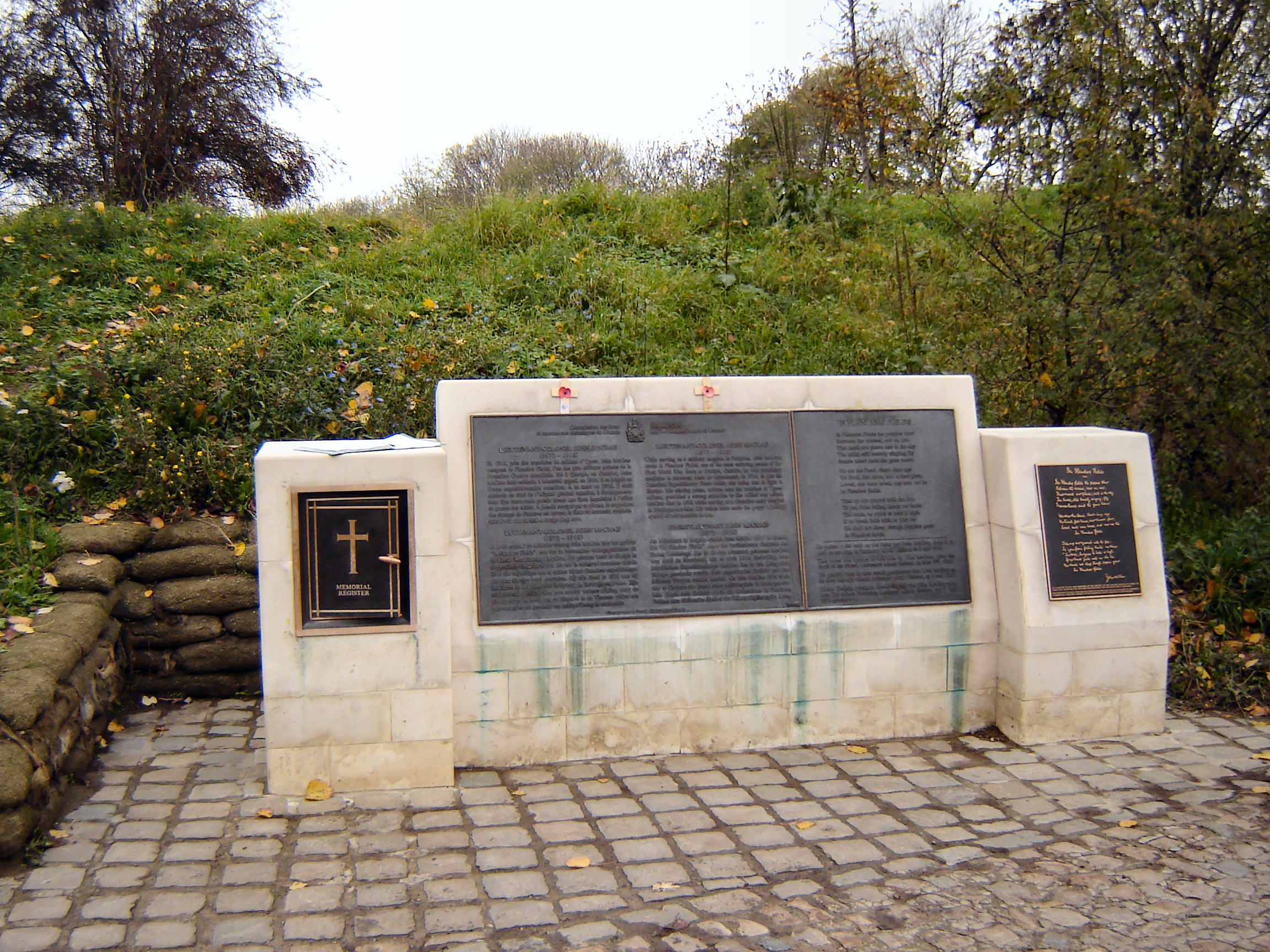
"In Flanders Fields" memorial on the John McCrae Memorial Site, Boezinge, Ypres, West Flanders, Belgium

A collection of his poetry, In Flanders Fields and Other Poems (1918), was published after his death.

In Flanders Fields
In Flanders Fields, the poppies blow
Between the crosses, row on row,
That mark our place; and in the sky
The larks, still bravely singing, fly
Scarce heard amid the guns below.

We are the dead, short days ago
We lived, felt dawn, saw sunset glow,
Loved and were loved, and now we lie
In Flanders fields.

Take up our quarrel with the foe:
To you from failing hands we throw
The torch; be yours to hold it high.
If ye break faith with us who die
We shall not sleep, though poppies grow
In Flanders fields.

— John McCrae

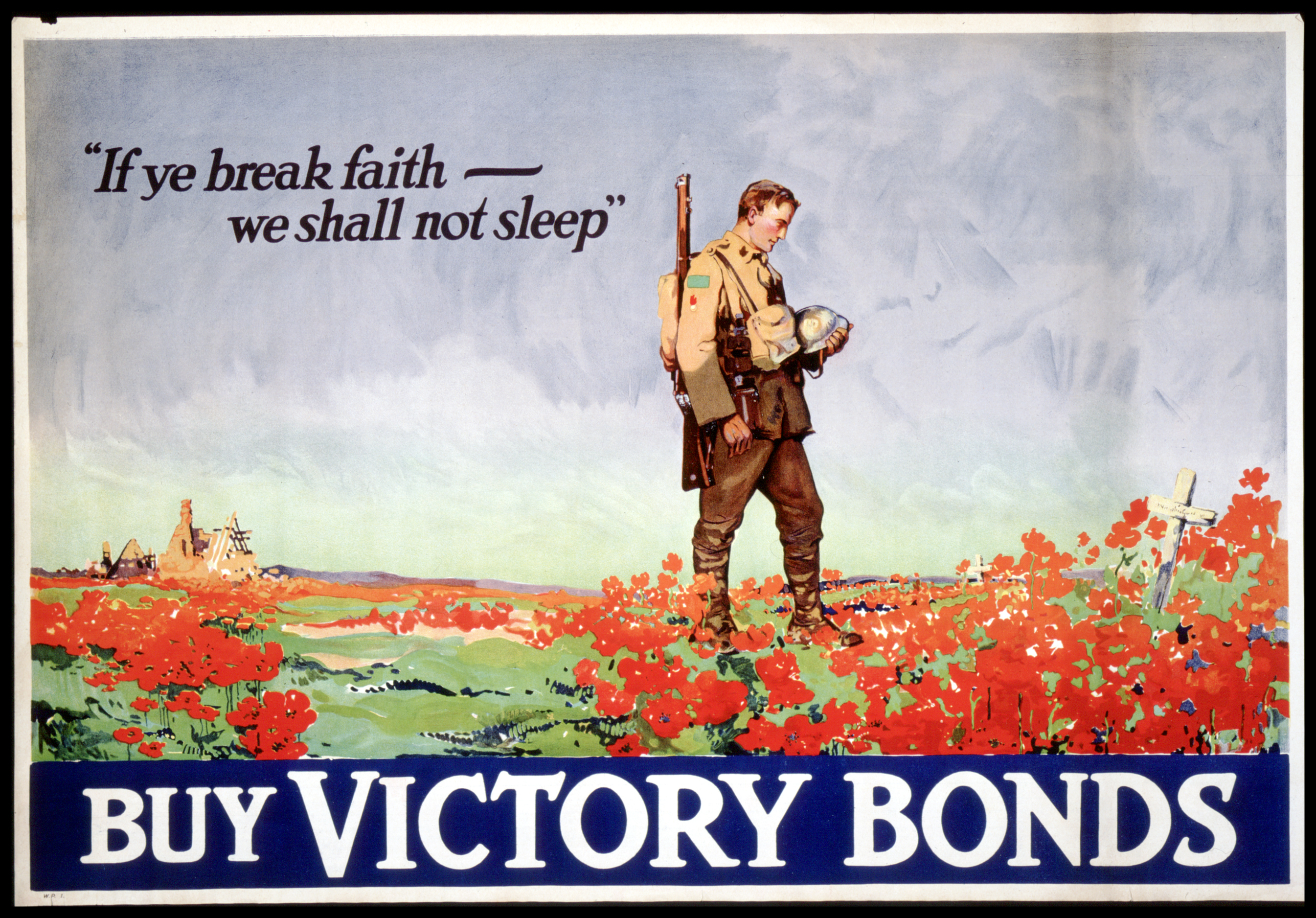
"If ye break faith – we shall not sleep" war poster created c. 1918; from the Archives of Ontario poster collection

Though various legends have developed as to the inspiration for the poem, the most commonly held belief is that McCrae wrote "In Flanders Fields" on May 3, 1915, the day after presiding over the funeral and burial of his friend Lieutenant Alexis Helmer, who had been killed during the Second Battle of Ypres. The poem was written as he sat upon the back of a medical field ambulance near an advance dressing post at Essex Farm, just north of Ypres. The poppy, which was a central feature of the poem, grew in great numbers in the spoiled earth of the battlefields and cemeteries of Flanders. An article by Veteran's Administration Canada provides this account:

The day before he wrote his famous poem, one of McCrae's closest friends was killed in the fighting and buried in a makeshift grave with a simple wooden cross. Wild poppies were already beginning to bloom between the crosses marking the many graves.

The Canadian government has placed a memorial to John McCrae that features "In Flanders Fields" at the site of the dressing station which sits beside the Commonwealth War Graves Commission's Essex Farm Cemetery. The Belgian government has named this site the "John McCrae Memorial Site".

== Legacy ==
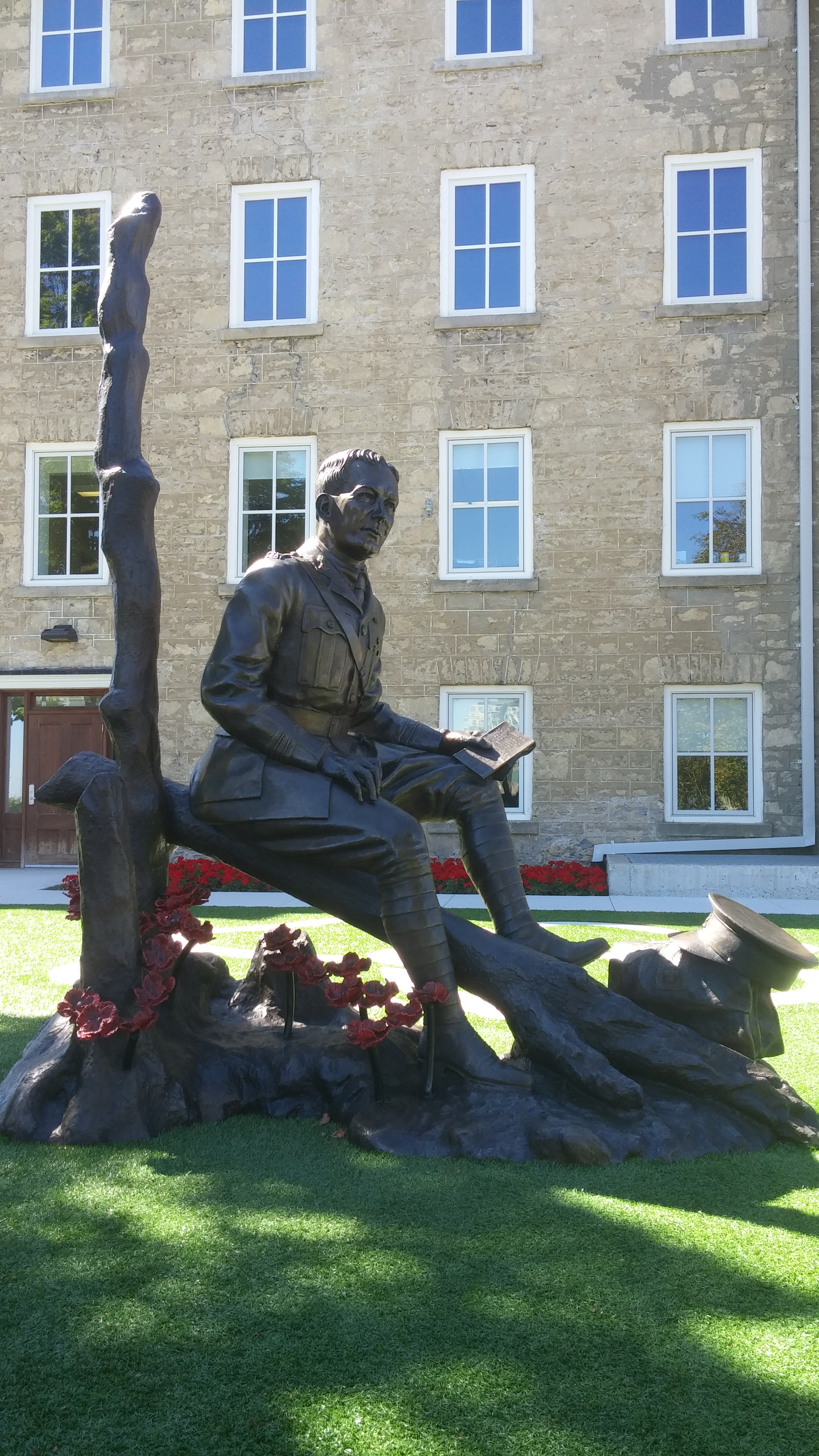
Colonel John McCrae statue at Guelph Civic Museum in Ontario, Canada, unveiled in 2015 to commemorate the 100th anniversary of his poem "In Flanders Fields"

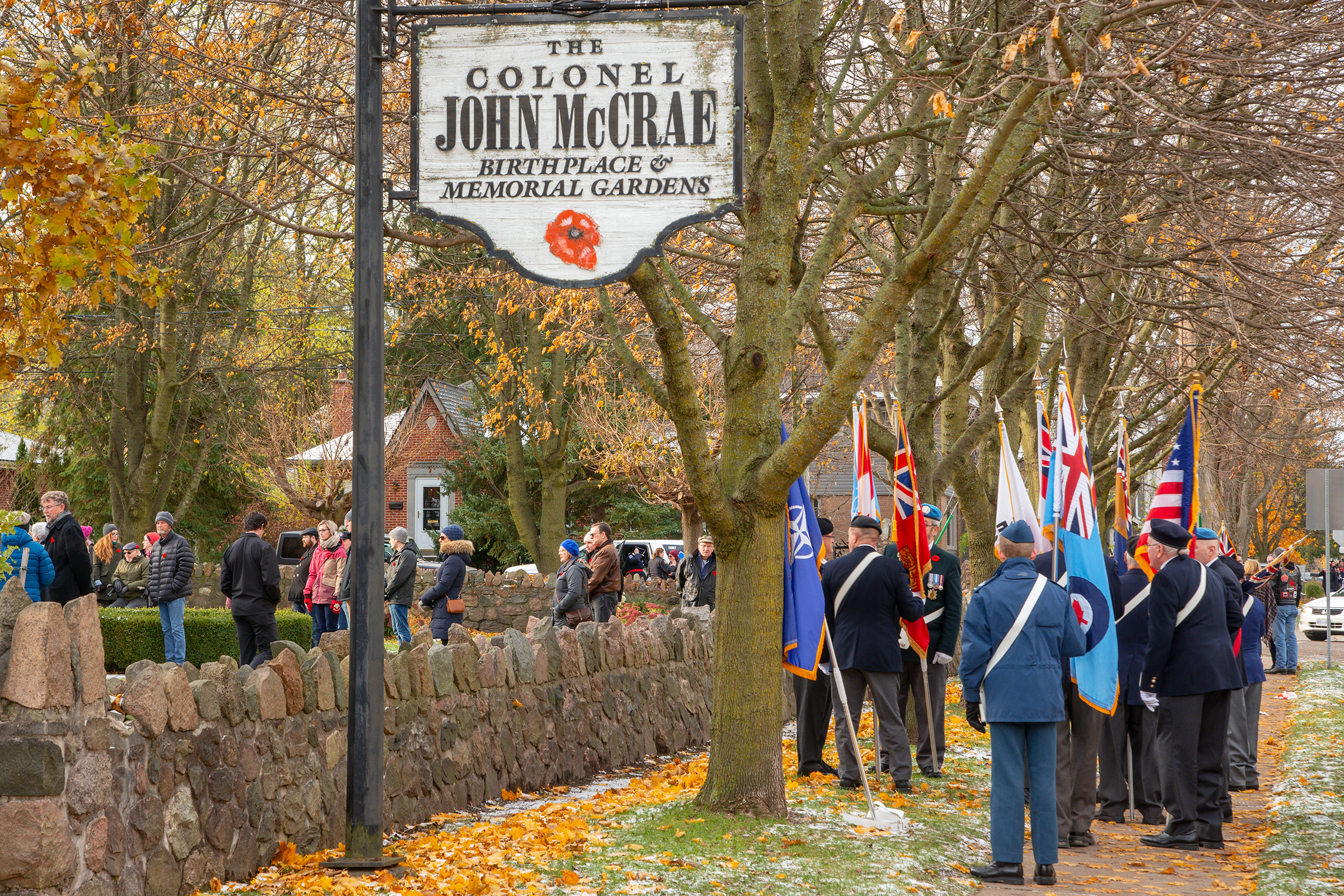
Sign at McCrae House

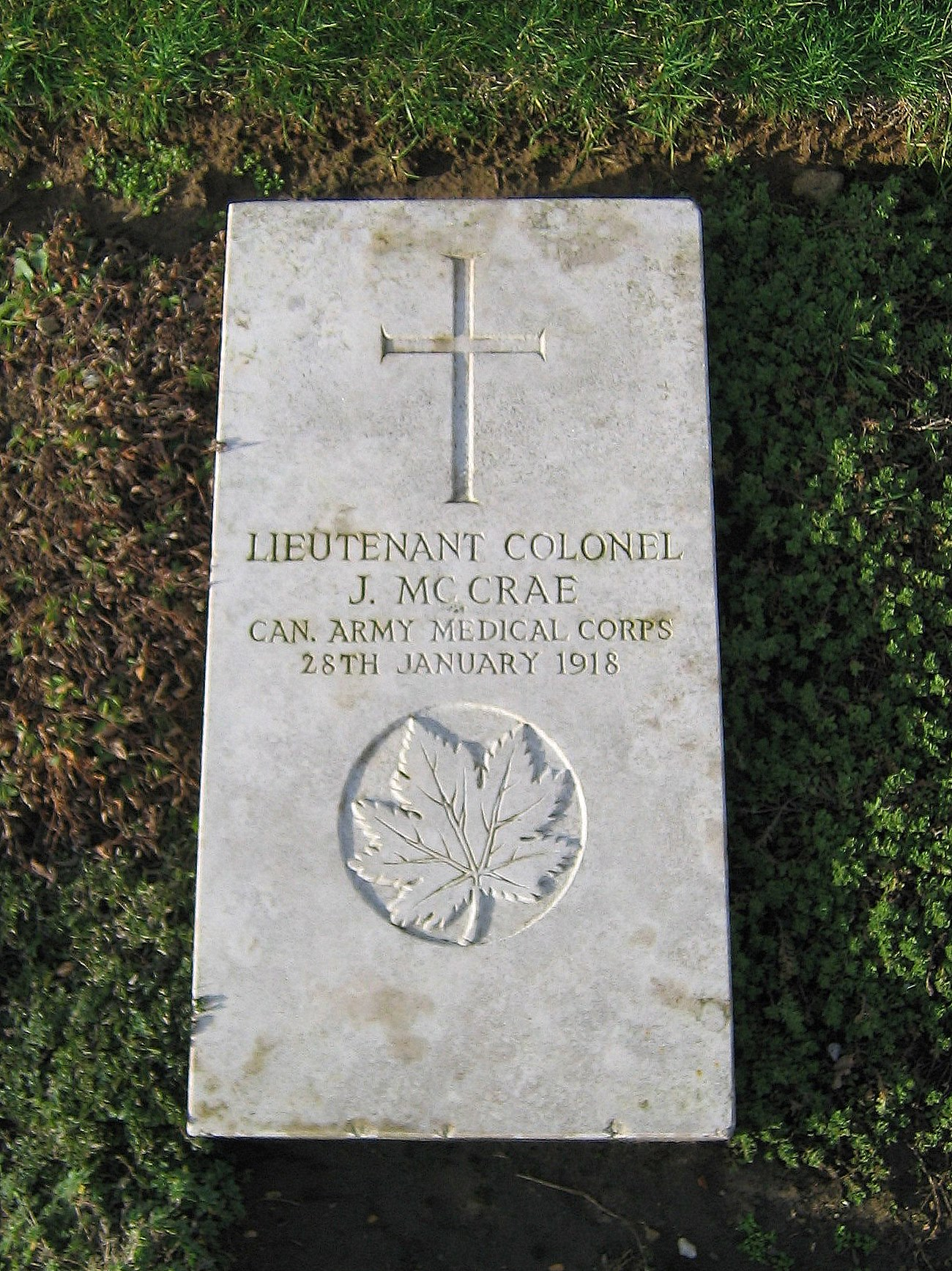
McCrae's grave at Wimereux cemetery

The Canadian Medical Association awards the John McCrae Memorial Medal to a health services member of the Canadian Armed Forces for exemplary service.

McCrae was designated a Person of National Historic Significance in 1946.

McCrae was the great-uncle of former Alberta Member of Parliament (MP) David Kilgour and of Kilgour's sister Geills Turner, who married former Canadian Prime Minister John Turner. Marie Christie Geills Kilgour (née McCrae) was the sister of John McCrae.

In 1918, Lieut. John Philip Sousa wrote the music to "In Flanders Fields, the poppies grow" words by Lieut.-Col John McCrae.

The Cloth Hall of the city of Ypres in Belgium has a permanent war museum called the "In Flanders Fields Museum", named after the poem. There are also a photograph and a short biographical memorial to McCrae in the St George Memorial Church in Ypres. In May 2007, to commemorate the 90th anniversary of the writing of his best-known poem, a two-day literary conference was held.

Educational institutions that have been named in McCrae's honour include:

- John McCrae Public School in Guelph
- John McCrae Public School in Markham
- John McCrae Senior Public School in Toronto
- John McCrae Secondary School in Ottawa

A bronze plaque memorial dedicated to Lt. Col. John McCrae was erected by the Guelph Collegiate Vocational Institute.

McCrae House was converted into a museum. The current Canadian War Museum has a gallery for special exhibits, called The Lieutenant-Colonel John McCrae Gallery.

In May 2015, a statue of McCrae by Ruth Abernathy was erected on Green Island (Rideau River) in Ottawa, Ontario. McCrae is dressed as an artillery officer and his medical bag nearby, as he writes. The statue shows the destruction of the battlefield and, at his feet, the poppies which are a symbol of Remembrance of World War I and all armed conflict since. A copy of that statue was erected at Guelph Civic Museum in Guelph in 2015.

The street next to the cemetery where he is buried is named in his honour, although the street is called "Rue Mac Crae".

Mount McCrae in British Columbia, is named for him. John McCrae Street in Richmond Hill, Ontario, is also named for him.

== Notes and references ==
- Busch, Briton Cooper (2003). Canada and the Great War: Western Front Association papers. McGill-Queen's University Press. ISBN 978-0-7735-2546-7
- Holt, Tonie and Valmai (1996). Poets of the Great War, "Lieutenant-Colonel John McCrae". Barnsley: Leo Cooper (Reprinted 1999). ISBN 978-0-85052-706-3
- Peddie, John. The Story of John McCrae Guelph Museums, Guelph, Ontario. Accessed: 2010-02-25
- Prescott, J F (1985). In Flanders fields: the story of John McCrae. Boston Mills Press. ISBN 978-0-919783-07-2
