= Lala Baba Commonwealth War Graves Commission Cemetery =

CWGC Cemetery in Gallipoli, Turkey

Coordinates: 40°17′24″N 26°14′23″E

Lala Baba
- Commonwealth War Graves Commission
- Used for those deceased August–December 1915
- Established: 1919
- Location: near Gallipoli, Turkey
- Total burials: 216
- Unknowns: 53

Burials by nation
- Allied Powers: British: 200

Burials by war
- World War I: 216

Lala Baba Cemetery is a Commonwealth War Graves Commission cemetery on the Gallipoli Peninsula in Turkey. It contains the remains of some of the soldiers killed during World War I during the battles at Gallipoli. This was an eight-month campaign fought by Commonwealth and French forces against Ottoman Empire forces to try to force the Ottoman Empire out of the war which it was hoped would open a supply route from the Mediterranean to Russia through the Dardanelles and Istanbul and to relieve the deadlock on the Western Front.

Several months into the campaign, additional troops were landed at Suvla, just north of the Anzac sector and attacks launched simultaneously from the existing positions. The Suvla landing was intended to capture high ground around the bay, but delays caused by indecision and confusion allowed the defending Turks to reinforce and few of the objectives were achieved.

The cemetery is sited on a small hill, Little Lala Baba, half a mile southwest of a larger, 160 high hill called Lala Baba. Lala Baba was captured on the morning of 7 August 1915, the day after the Suvla Bay Landings. The cemetery was constructed after the Armistice from isolated graves and the concentration of burials from nine surrounding cemeteries. As well as named grave markers, 53 markers are unnamed and special memorials commemorate 16 soldiers thought to be buried in the cemetery but whose graves have not been identified.

== Notable graves ==
Brigadier General Paul Aloysius Kenna VC DSO is buried in the cemetery. Kenna was commissioned in 1886 and awarded his VC following the Battle of Omdurman in 1898. He had competed in horse riding in the 1912 Summer Olympics. Kenna died of his wounds on 30 August 1915, aged 53. At the time was in command of the 3rd (Nottinghamshire and Derbyshire) Mounted Brigade.

== Bibliography ==
- Davies, Frank; Maddocks, Graham (1995). Bloody Red Tabs. Leo Cooper. ISBN 0-85052-463-6.
