= McCrae House =

House in Guelph, Ontario, Canada

Coordinates: 43°32′9.7″N 80°14′42.1″W

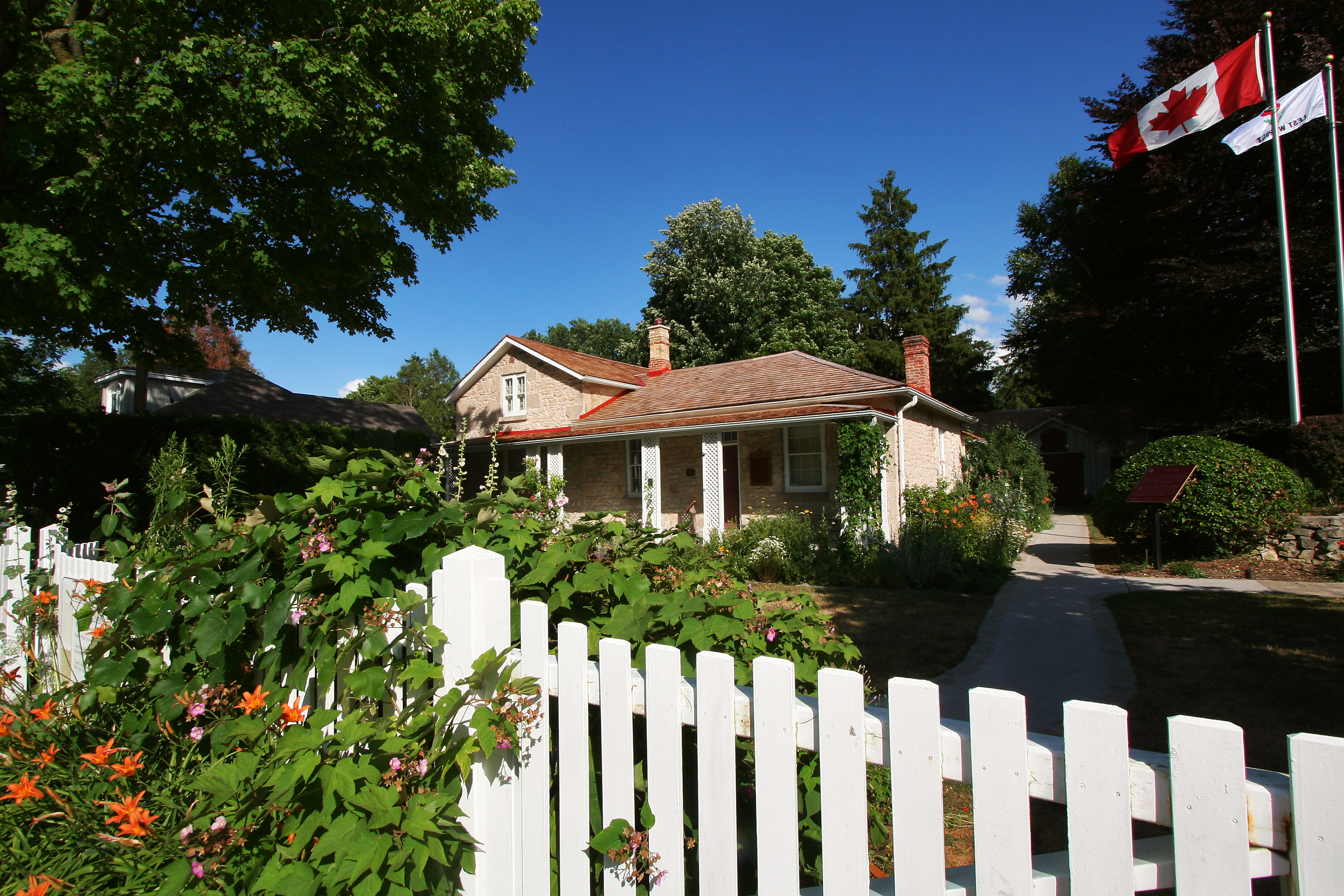
- Established: 1966
- Location: 108 Water Street; Guelph, Ontario, Canada; N1G 1A6
- Website: guelphmuseums.ca/venue/mccrae-house/

National Historic Site of Canada
- Designated: 1966

McCrae House, located in Guelph, Ontario, is the birthplace of John McCrae (b. 1872 – d. 1918), doctor, soldier and author of the famous First World War poem "In Flanders Fields". The house is a National Historic Site of Canada.

== History ==
This small limestone cottage, built in 1858, was owned by the McCrae family from 1870 to 1873. Other families occupied the house until 1966, when a group of Guelph citizens purchased the building with the intention of preserving it as a museum. This group formed the Lt. Col. John McCrae Birthplace Society and began to raise money for its restoration.

The federal government through the Historic Sites and Monuments Board designated both John McCrae as a person of national significance, and the house as a place of national significance. McCrae House is designated under the Ontario Heritage Act. The operation of the museum was transferred to the City of Guelph in 1983 and, along with Guelph Civic Museum, was merged under the name Guelph Museums. The Guelph Civic Museum (c. 1847) is also designated under the Ontario Heritage Act.

The Colonel John McCrae Memorial, was opened on 5 October 1963, by his friend: Colonel Lawrence Moore Cosgrave.

McCrae House contains both permanent and temporary exhibition space that interprets the life and times of John McCrae. Yearly themes are offered. Summer activities include Poppy Push, Canada Day, Teddy Bear Picnic, History Camp and special teas in the garden. The gardening volunteers have worked to create an award-winning garden reflecting the time period of the mid-to-late 19th century.

In 2019, Guelph Museums announced that the House would again host a Backyard Theatre in July 2020, with a show that would not be a "literal telling of McCrae's story" but would contain a "significant amount of McCrae-specific content." Revenue from ticket sales would cover at least part of the cost of the production. A one-person show was presented in summer 2019 dramatizing the life of McCrae and the 2018 show was a love story set during the First World War.

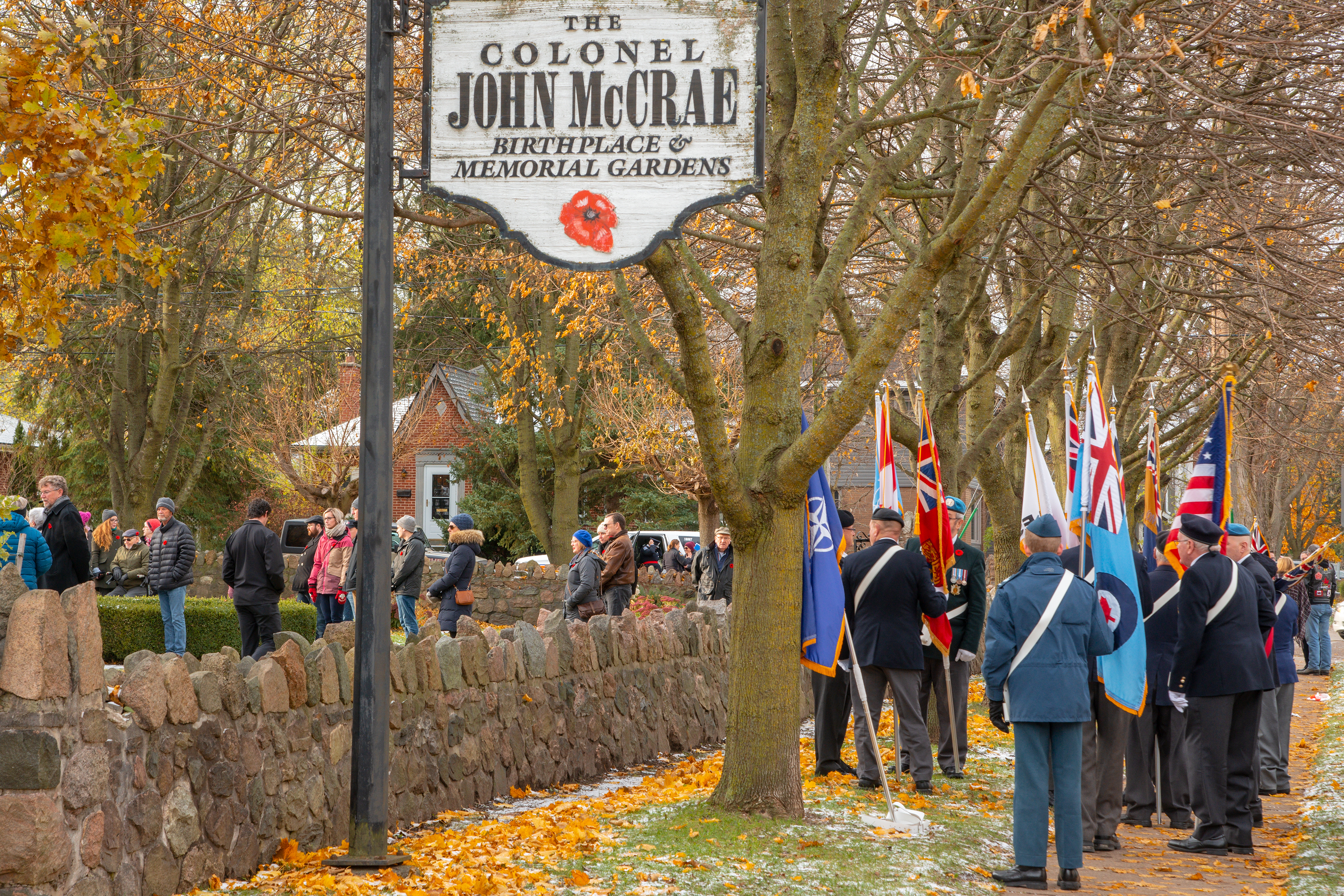
McCrae House, Remembrance Day 2018

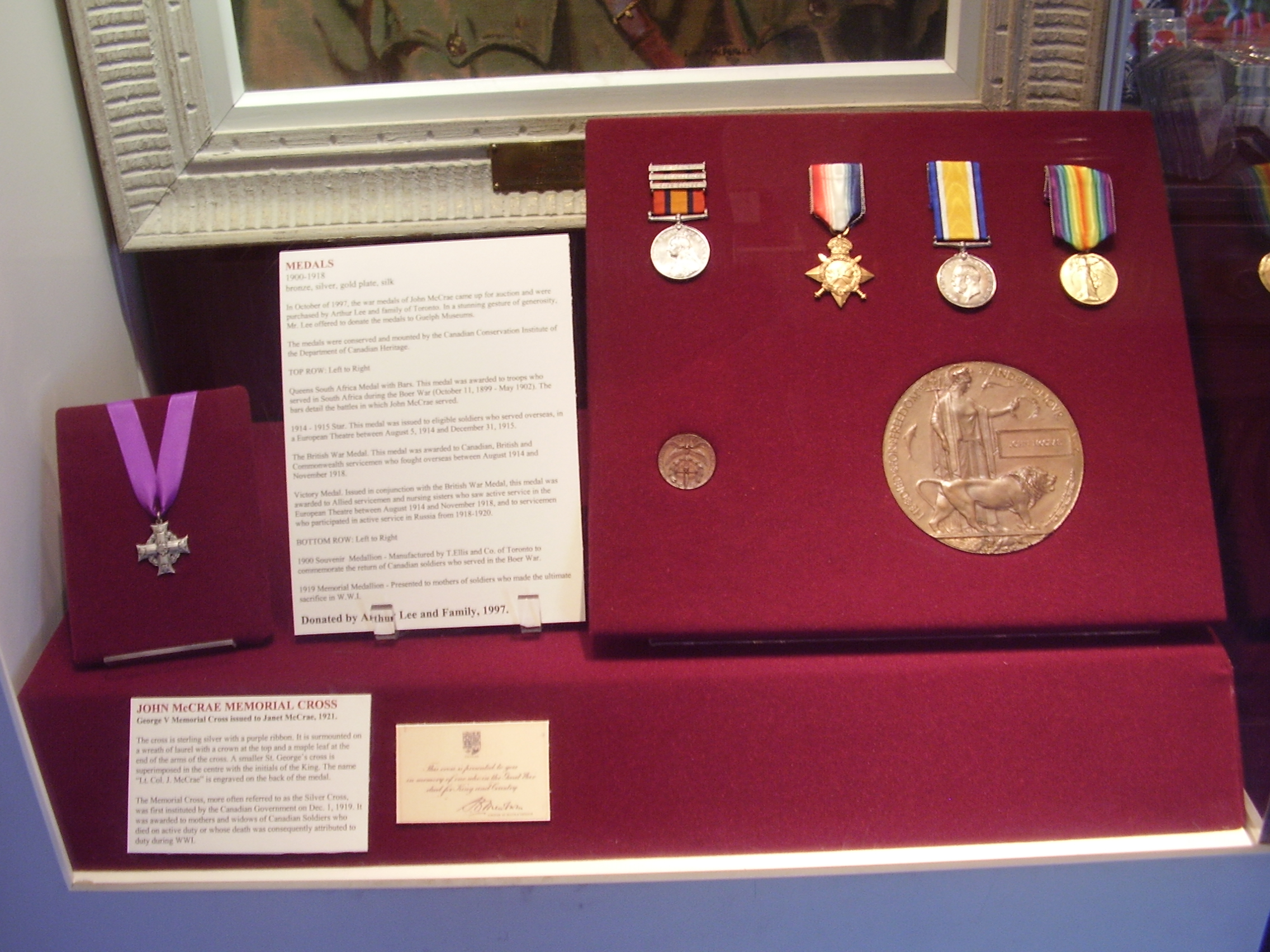
McCrae House - John McCrae's medals

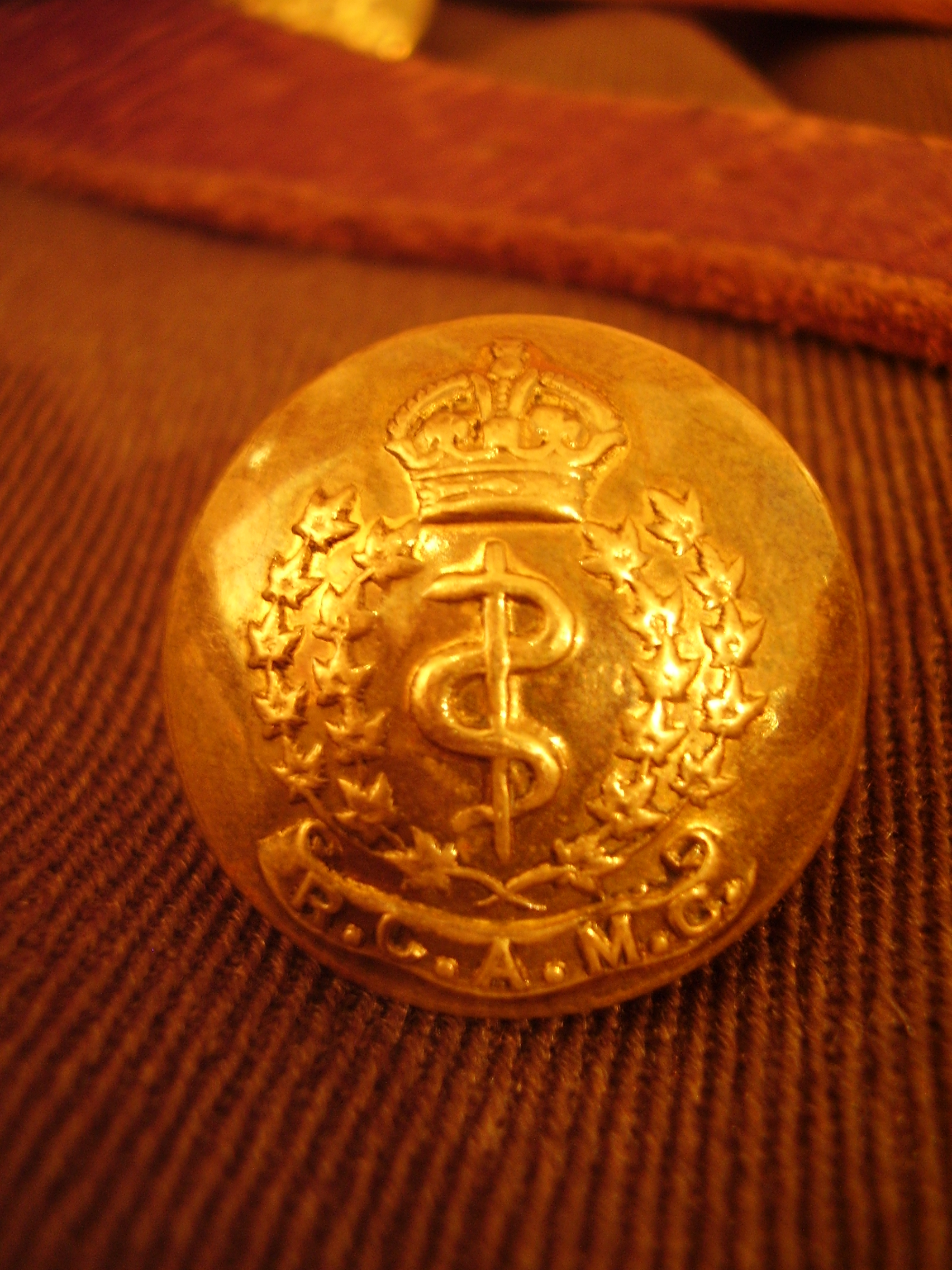
Royal Canadian Army Medical Corps button

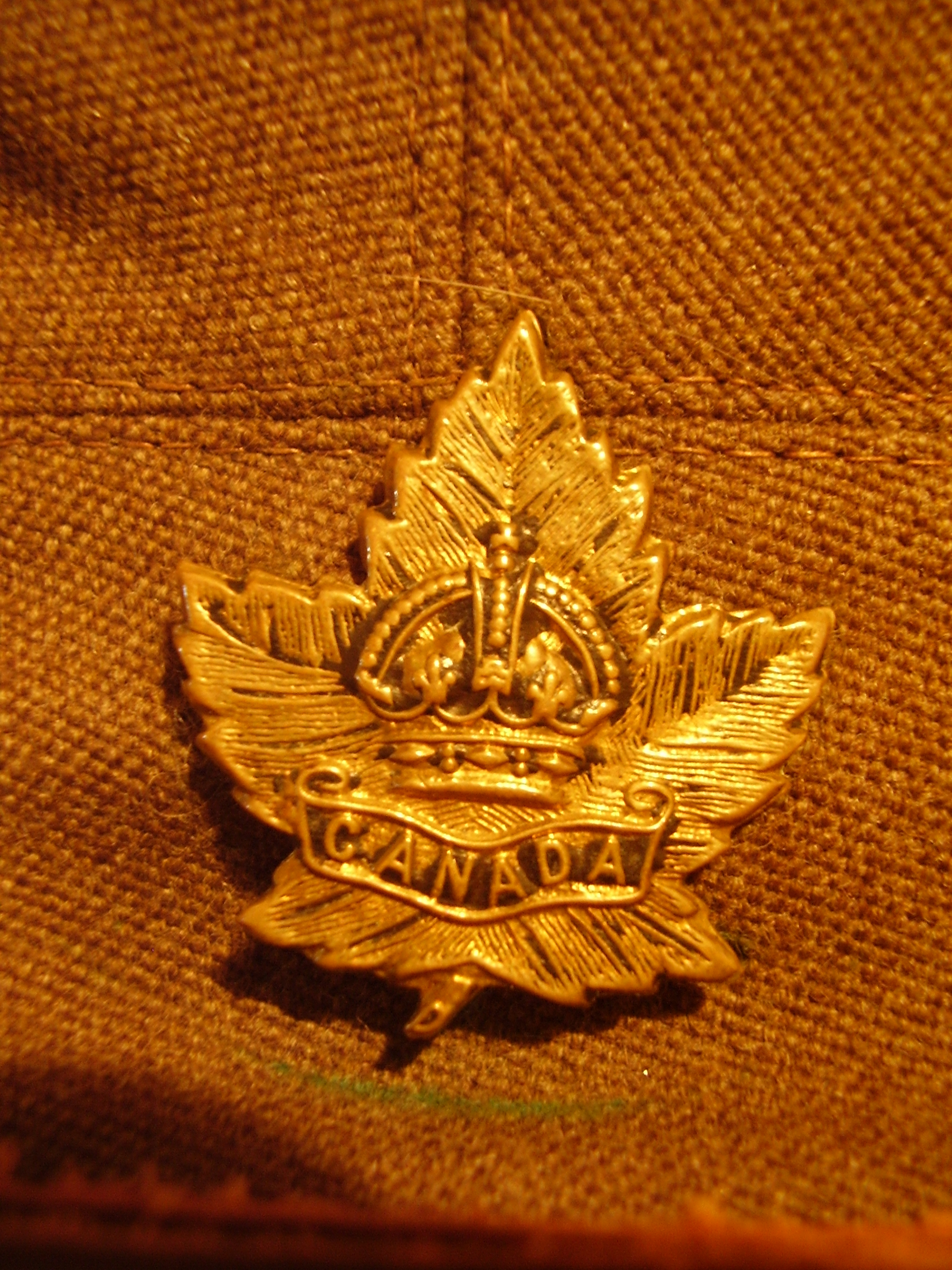
McCrae House - John McCrae's Officer's Cap badge
