= McCrea =

McCrea may refer to:

== People ==
- Ann McCrea (born 1931), American actress
- Annette E. McCrea (1858–1928), American landscape architect
- Barry McCrea (born 1974), Irish writer and academic
- Basil McCrea (born 1959), Northern Irish politician
- Charles McCrea (1877–1952), Canadian politician
- Clan Macrae, a Highland Scottish clan
- D'Arcy McCrea (1896–1940), Irish tennis player
- Earl-Jean McCrea (born 1942), American singer
- Francis McCrea (1852–1926), Canadian businessman and politician
- Frank McCrea (1896–1981), American baseball player
- Ian McCrea (born 1976), Northern Irish politician
- J. Nash McCrea (1887–1959), American cyclist and newspaper editor
- James McCrea (1848–1913), American railroad executive
- James J. McCrea (died 1969), Irish politician
- Jane McCrea (c. 1752–1777), American woman killed by Native American warrior during Revolutionary War
- Javon McCrea (born 1992), American basketball player
- Jody McCrea (1934–2009), American actor
- Joel McCrea (1905–1990), American actor
- John McCrea, multiple people
- Kevin McCrea, American businessman and political candidate
- Leo McCrea (born 2003), British-Swiss Paralympic swimmer
- Mark McCrea (born 1987), Irish rugby union player
- Michael McCrea (born c. 1958), British convicted killer and former financial adviser
- Phil McCrea (1948–2016), American biologist and educator
- Raymond McCrea (born 1945), Northern Irish politician
- Terrence McCrea (born 1971), Jamaican hurdler
- Theodore H. McCrea (1908–1986), American suffragan bishop
- Tully McCrea (1839–1918), United States Army general
- Walter McCrea (1810–1892), Canadian politician
- William McCrea (astronomer) (1904–1999), British astronomer and mathematician
- William McCrea, Baron McCrea of Magherafelt and Cookstown (born 1948), Northern Irish politician

== Places ==
- McCrea, Louisiana
- McCrea Furnace, Pennsylvania
- McCrea Heights, Ontario
- McCrea Mills, New Jersey
- McCrea Township, Minnesota
- Joel McCrea Ranch, California
- Matthew McCrea House, Ohio
