= Thomas McCrae (physician) =

Canadian physician (1870–1935)

Thomas McCrae (December 16, 1870 – June 30, 1935) was professor of Medicine at Jefferson Medical College, and student and later colleague of Sir William Osler. Often quoted in medical training for his remark "more is missed by not looking than not knowing". He was the brother of John McCrae, author of "In Flanders Fields".

== Early life and medical training ==
Thomas McCrae was born in Guelph, Ontario, Canada to Lieutenant-Colonel David McCrae and Janet Simpson Eckford McCrae.

McCrae trained in medicine at the University of Toronto, obtaining his Doctorate of Medicine in 1903.

He became an assistant resident at Johns Hopkins Hospital in 1895 in Baltimore, Maryland and was later joined by his brother in 1899. It was there that he became associated with Dr William Osler (later Sir William) who was the "pre-eminent medical educator of his time".

McCrae's association with Osler continued with their collaboration in The Principles and Practice of Medicine, an authoritative medical text at the time. McCrae was initially assistant editor, but later became the editor of this text upon Osler's death.

== Later career ==
In 1912 he became Professor of Medicine at Jefferson Medical College in Philadelphia.

He was elected to the American Philosophical Society in 1914.

"In 1924, he was Lumleian lecturer at the Royal College of Physicians in London. He was chairman of the Section on Practice of Medicine of the American Medical Association, 1914–1915. From 1916 to 1925 he was secretary of the Association of American Physicians and in 1930 its president."

McCrae died in 1935 in Philadelphia with no children to survive him and wife Amy Marian Gwyn. He is described in an obituary in the Canadian Medical Association Journal as a "deep student, a fine clinician, a great teacher".
