= Thomas McCrae (politician) =

Upper Canada politician

Thomas McCrae (died June 11, 1814) was a farmer, innkeeper and political figure in Upper Canada.

He served as steward on a British ship on Lake Erie during the American Revolution. He was living in Detroit in 1779, but settled in Raleigh Township around 1789. He was named justice of the peace in the Western District in 1806. He also served as captain in the local militia during the War of 1812. He represented Kent in the Legislative Assembly of Upper Canada from 1800 to 1804.

His son William was later also a member of the legislative assembly.
