= McCray =

McCray is a surname. Notable people with the surname include:

- Billy McCray (1927–2012), American politician from Kansas
- Bobby McCray, American football player
- Bruce McCray, American football player
- Carrie Allen McCray, African-American writer
- Chirlane McCray, African-American writer and activist, wife of NYC mayor Bill de Blasio
- Chris McCray, American professional basketballer
- Cory McCray (born 1982), American politician from Maryland
- David McCray, German professional basketballer
- Ewan McCray, English cricketer
- John Henry McCray, American journalist
- Josh McCray (born 2002), American football player
- Larry McCray, American blues guitarist and singer
- Lane McCray, American singer with La Bouche
- L. J. McCray (born 1991), American football player
- LJ McCray (defensive lineman) (born 2005), American football player
- Nikki McCray-Penson (1971–2023), American basketball player and coach
- Prentice McCray, American former football safety in the NFL
- Richard McCray (1937–2021), American astronomer and astrophysicist
- Robert McCray (born 1996), American football player
- Rodney McCray (basketball), basketball player who played in the NBA for several teams
- Rodney McCray (baseball), baseball player best known for crashing through the outfield wall of Civic Stadium in Portland, Oregon
- Rube McCray, head coach for the William & Mary Tribe men's basketball team between 1943 and 1945
- Scooter McCray, American professional basketball player
- Shyyell Diamond Sanchez-McCray, American drag performer and activist
- Tim McCray, Canadian Football League running back
- Trinity McCray, American dancer, model and professional wrestler
- Warren T. McCray, 30th Governor of the U.S. state of Indiana from 1921 to 1924
