= Eaton Centre =

Canadian shopping centres

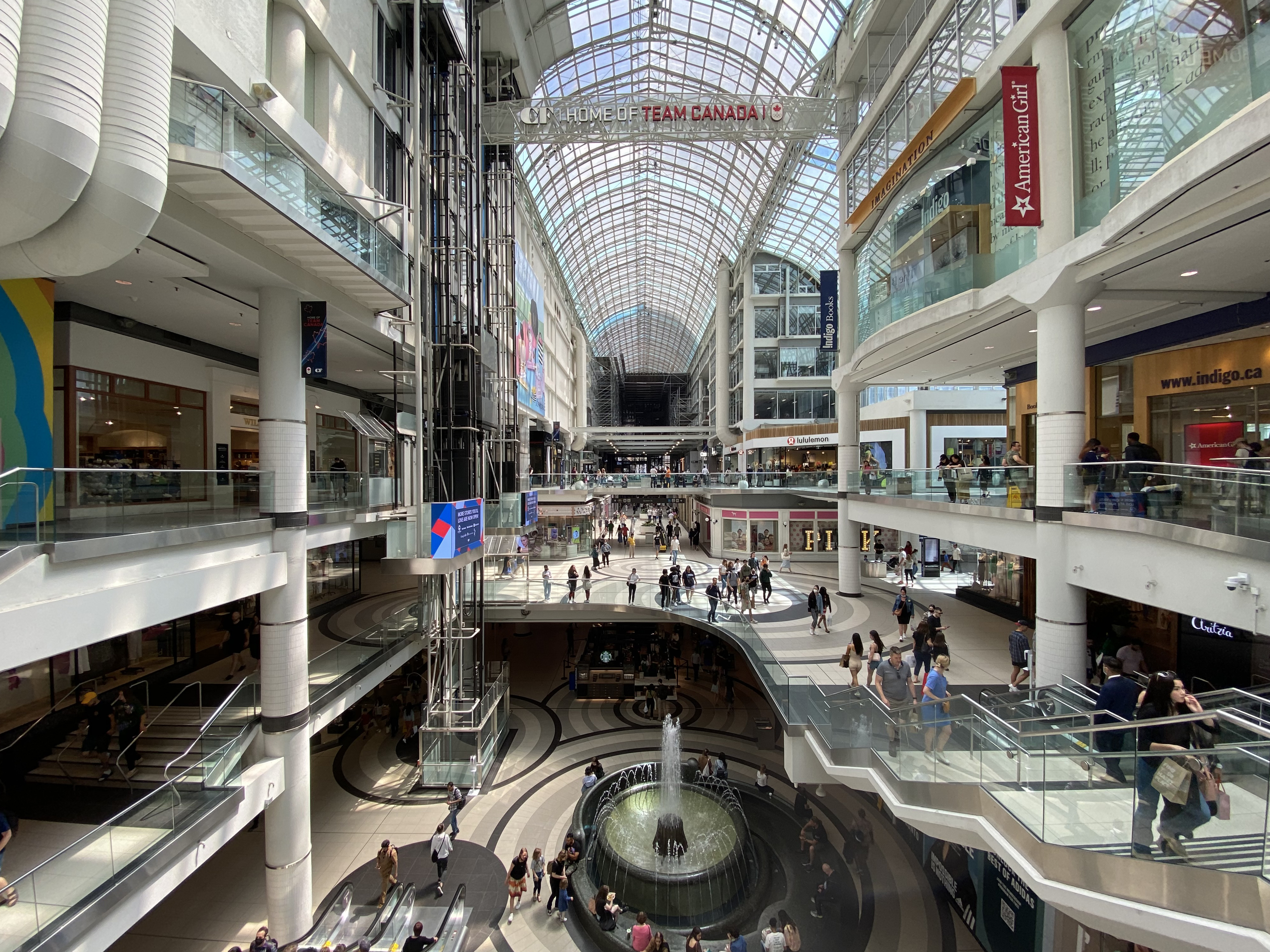
Toronto Eaton Centre in 2022

Eaton Centre (French: Centre Eaton) is a name associated with shopping centres in Canada, originating with Eaton's, one of Canada's largest department store chains at the time that these malls were developed. Eaton's partnered with development companies throughout the 1970s and 1980s to develop downtown shopping malls in cities across Canada. Each mall contained an Eaton's store, or was in close proximity to an Eaton's store, and typically the mall itself carried the "Eaton Centre" name. These joint ventures were a significant retail development trend in Canada during that period.

With the demise of the Eaton's chain in 1999, and the retiring of the Eaton's name as a retail banner in 2002, most of these malls have been renamed, and most of these Eaton's store locations were converted to Sears Canada stores. Some malls in smaller urban areas, which were typically the least successful of all the Eaton Centre developments, have been demolished or converted to other, non-retail uses. In 2014, Sears announced that it would close its Toronto Eaton Centre store, which was eventually converted into a Nordstrom, followed by vacating their head office in the upper levels after a bankruptcy liquidation. Sears Canada went out of business in 2018.

Only the Toronto and Montreal Eaton Centres have retained the "Eaton Centre" branding for their entire existence.

== Current Eaton Centres ==
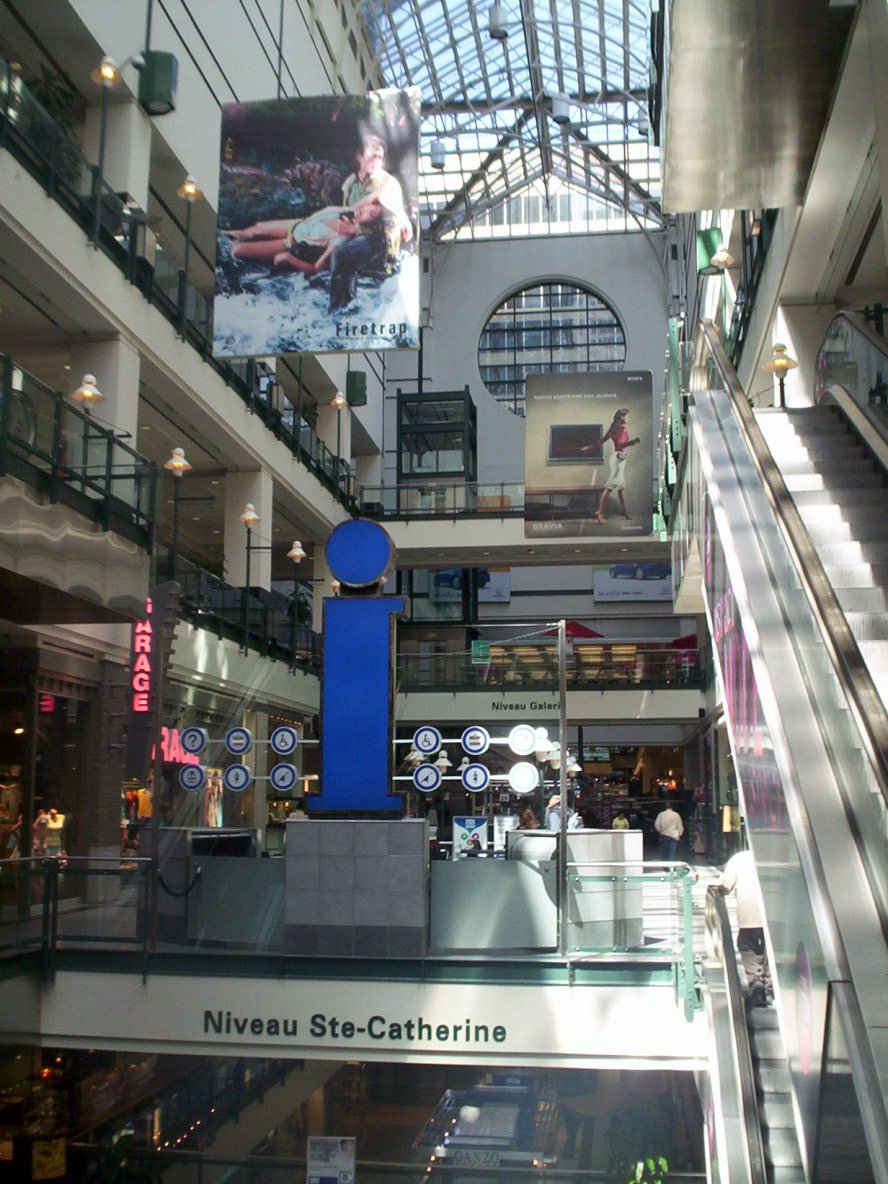
Montreal Eaton Centre in 2006

- Toronto Eaton Centre, Toronto, Ontario: Opened in 1977, it is the largest of the Eaton Centres and one of Toronto's most visited tourist attractions. The mall sits on the site of the original store operated by Eaton's founder, Timothy Eaton, and the related Eaton's factories and mail order buildings.
- Montreal Eaton Centre, Montreal, Quebec: Opened in 1990 on Sainte-Catherine Street, it is Downtown Montreal's largest shopping mall. It is situated next to Eaton's former Montreal flagship store. When Eaton's closed in 1999, the former flagship location was renovated and reopened in 2002 as the Complexe Les Ailes mall (after the new anchor tenant Les Ailes de la Mode). In March 2014, mall owner Ivanhoe Cambridge announced that it would merge the Montreal Eaton Centre with the neighbouring Complexe Les Ailes and, contrary to a previously made statement, decided to preserve the "Montreal Eaton Centre" name. The merger and renovation, which was completed in 2020, restored the Eaton name to the former flagship store building.

== Former Eaton Centres ==
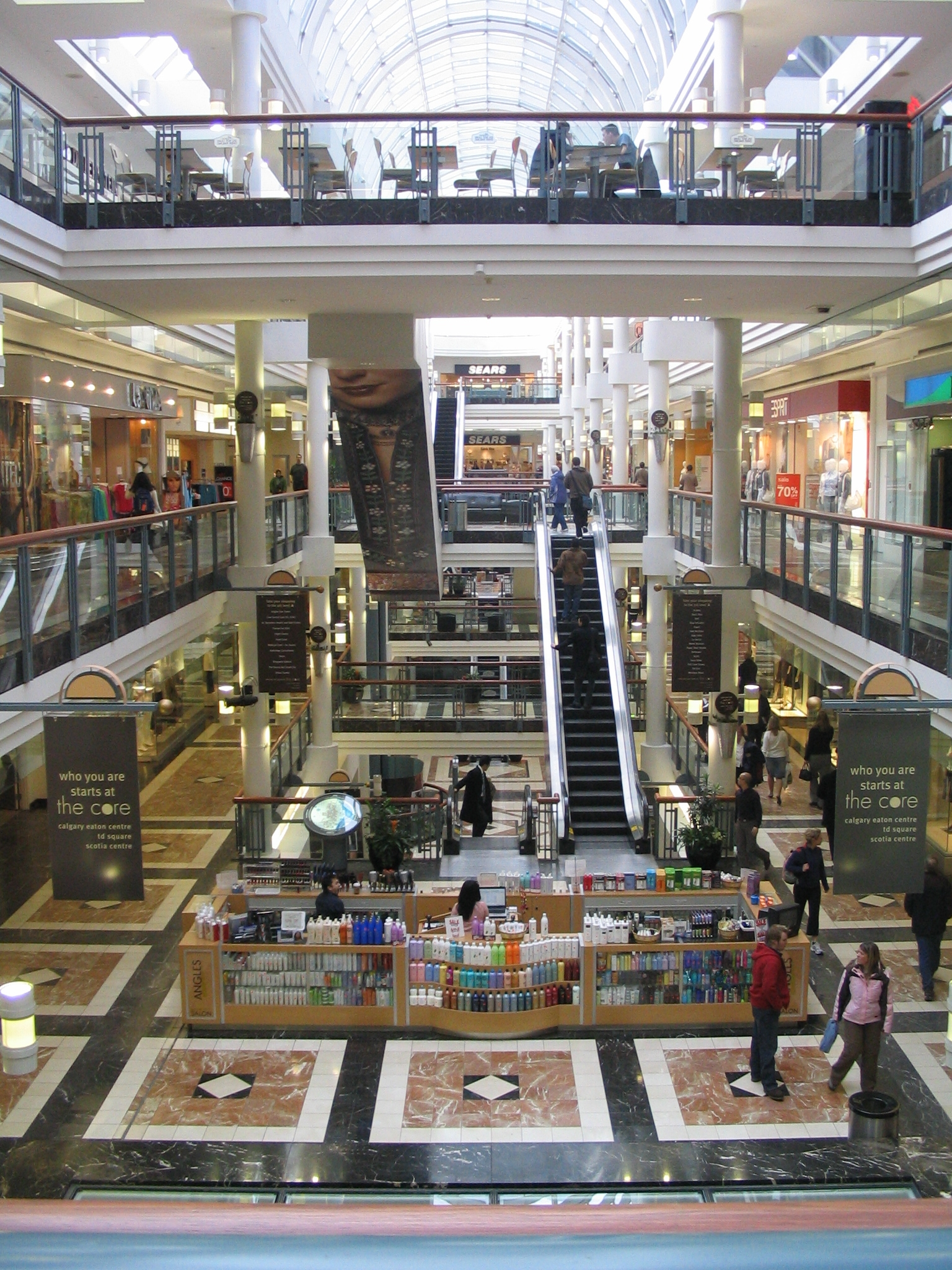
Calgary Eaton Centre (now the Core Shopping Centre), prior to renovations in 2006

- Calgary Eaton Centre (now the Core Shopping Centre), Calgary, Alberta: This downtown mall was constructed in the late 1980s, and required the demolition of the historic Eaton's store (Eaton's moved into larger premises in the new mall). Two facades of the old Eaton's store (1929–1980s) were preserved, and incorporated into the new retail podium. The "Calgary Eaton Centre" name was retained until 2010 (despite Eaton's departure in 2002) when it was dropped from marketing and branding efforts and renamed the Core Shopping Centre.
- Edmonton Eaton Centre (now Edmonton City Centre), Edmonton, Alberta: After the demise of Eaton's, the Edmonton Eaton Centre and Edmonton Centre, two formerly independent malls, were redeveloped into one shopping complex, and the Bay, a former Eaton's competitor, moved into the former Woodward's store in 1993 then in 2002 moved into the former Eaton's store. In 2021, the Bay closed this location and the space is currently vacant.
- Victoria Eaton Centre (now the Bay Centre), Victoria, British Columbia: When Eaton's went bankrupt, the former Eaton's store (1990–1999) in this mall was occupied for a short time by Sears Canada's "eatons" experiment, and afterwards by a Sears store. When Sears vacated the mall, the "Victoria Eaton Centre" was renamed to reflect the mall's new department store tenant, the Bay.
- Eaton Centre Metrotown (now Metropolis at Metrotown), Burnaby, British Columbia: The Eaton Centre Metrotown opened in 1989. With the departure of the Eaton's store a decade later, the Eaton Centre and the adjacent Metrotown Centre were incorporated into one megamall complex.
- Eaton Place (now Cityplace), Winnipeg, Manitoba: This shopping and office complex in downtown Winnipeg occupies the former Eaton's mail order warehouse, and is located behind the city's new arena, Canada Life Centre (the site of the former downtown Eaton's store, now demolished).

== Other major Eaton's locations ==
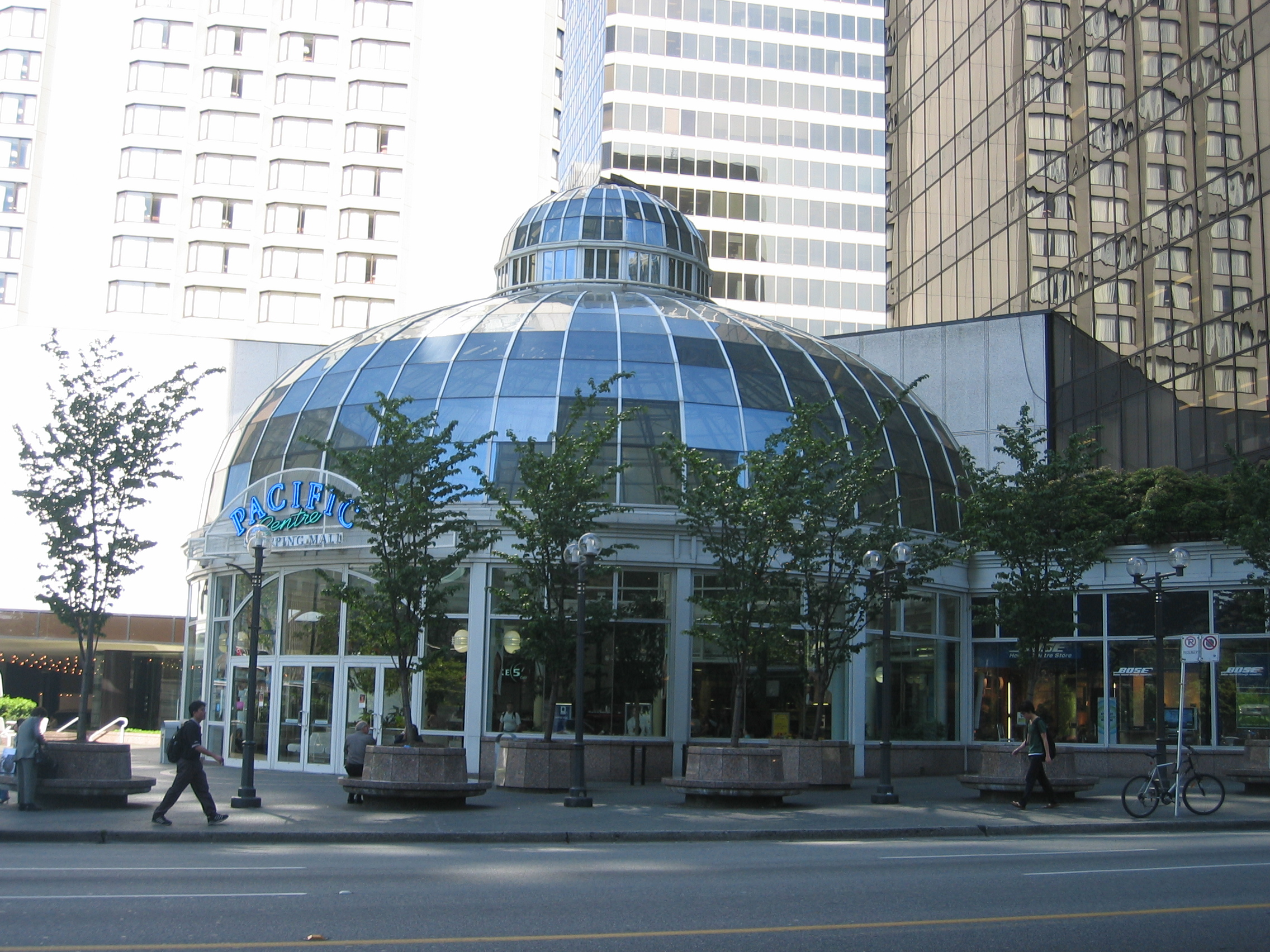
Pacific Centre in Vancouver

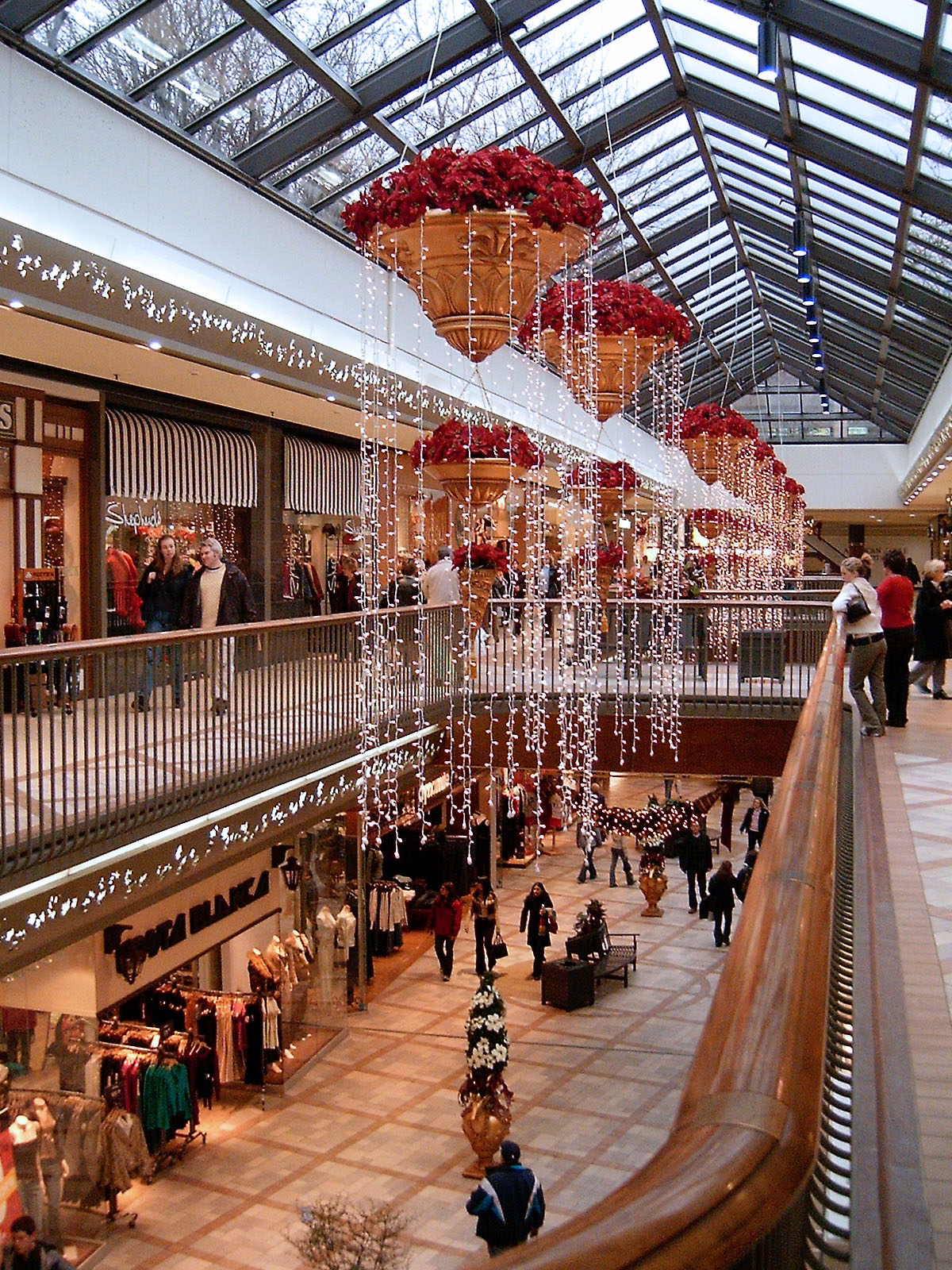
Rideau Centre in Ottawa

These two malls were developed by the Eaton's chain and its partners and housed Eaton's stores, but were never branded as "Eaton Centres":

- Pacific Centre, Vancouver, British Columbia: Constructed in phases from 1971 to 1973, this mall contained Eaton's flagship Vancouver store.
- Rideau Centre, Ottawa, Ontario: Prior to its construction from 1981 to 1982, Ottawa's "Rideau Centre" project had been subject to many years of planning. Prior to the mall's opening, Eaton's attempted to rename the mall the "Rideau Eaton Centre", but the chain was forced to back down due to the local outcry generated by the "eleventh hour" proposed name change. Eaton's did add an "E" to the mall's logo, which has since been removed.

== Ontario Downtown Renewal Program ==
Beginning in the early 1970s, Ontario's provincial government led by Bill Davis poured millions of dollars over the course of a decade into the "Ontario Downtown Renewal Program" (ODRP) in order to revitalize the downtown retail areas of smaller communities throughout the province. Typically, this involved the construction of new downtown malls to compete with growing suburban shopping opportunities.

However, author Rod McQueen wrote in The Eatons that there was no business case or market analysis to justify the construction of these downtown malls. Many residents noted that the enclosed facilities represented the antithesis to the one unique aspect of downtown shopping, street-related stores. Often the new downtown mall had a "vacuum cleaner" effect of attracting the stronger street boutiques away from their neighbourhoods to become tenants in unstable shopping centres. The lack of free parking in the downtown area was the number one impetus for residents flocking to suburban malls which had free parking, which did not help the cause of the downtown malls whose garages charged fees, collected by the municipalities who usually financed the construction mall garages. Suburban malls furthermore had the inherent advantage of conveniently located at where the city's population was relocating towards, including better access to arterial roads and freeways. Conventional wisdom held that only larger cities, with populations of 200,000 or greater, had a wealthy enough clientele to support upscale department stores such as Eaton's or Hudson's Bay (the latter which only participated in the Galleria London location), while communities with populations of 100,000 or less were already well-served by existing retailers, such as discount stores Zellers and Woolco, and the mid-range department store Sears Canada (which only participated in three ODRP locations).

Nonetheless, Eaton's became a partner in the program, and its stores served as the anchor tenant in many of these malls. As stated in The Globe and Mail newspaper,

The history of retailing is filled with tales of merchants who were brilliantly prescient in their location choices, and others who totally misread their markets and fell flat. In the 1970s, the T. Eaton Co. became a textbook example of the latter when it built huge department stores in the increasingly empty downtowns of small Canadian cities; far from reviving the cores, the stores failed as consumers kept taking their business to suburban malls.

Major retail chains attracted to new downtown malls left as soon as their initial leases expired, while Eaton's bankruptcy filing and reorganization in 1997 resulting in the closure of all of its downtown locations in Ontario except those in Toronto and Ottawa. Sears Canada's ODRP locations in Chatham and Cornwall continued to survive short-term since they had no suburban malls as competition.

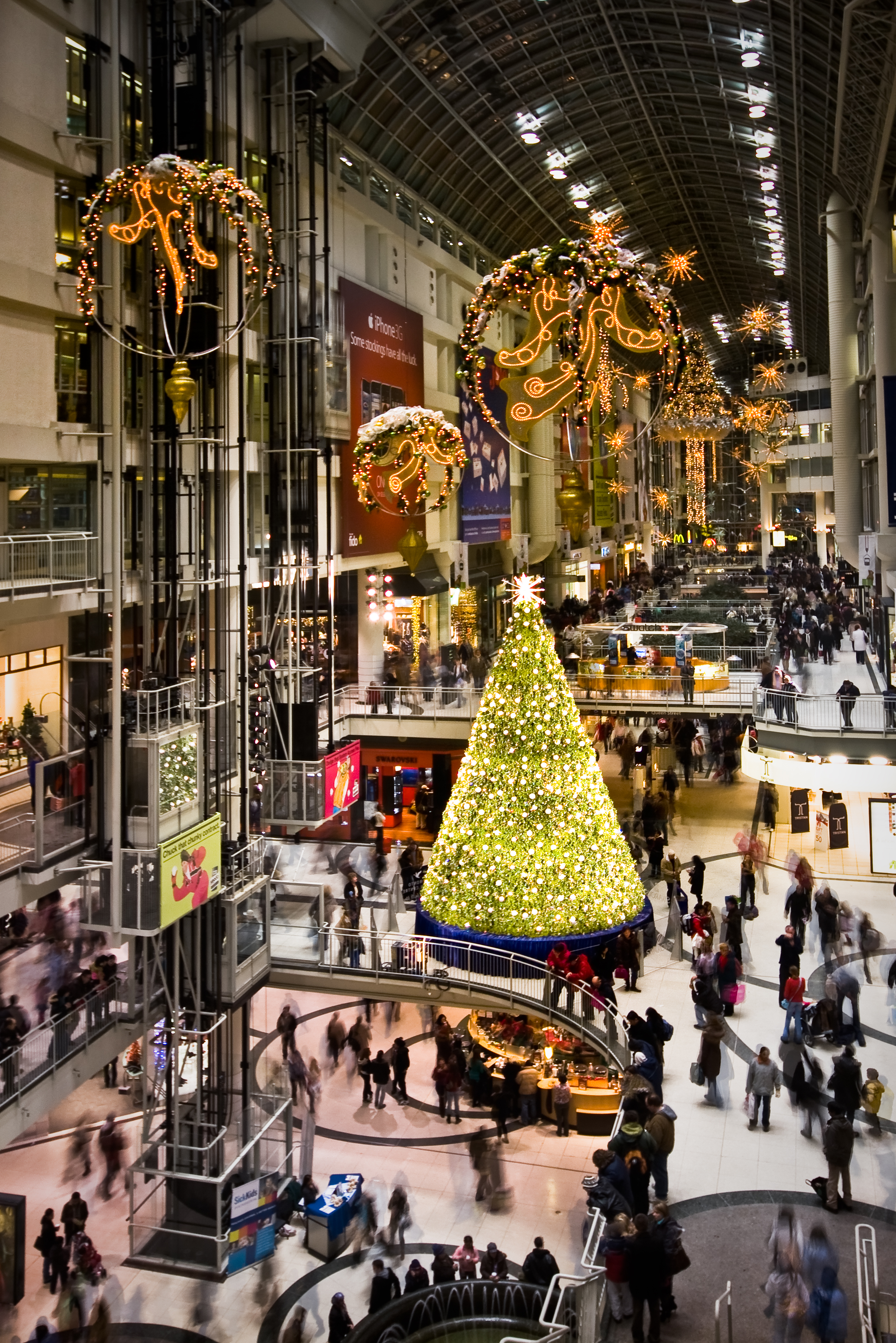
Toronto Eaton Centre at Christmas

None of these malls below ever enjoyed the success of some of the Eaton Centres in larger cities, and their failure contributed to the demise of the entire Eaton's chain.

- Hamilton Eaton Centre (now Hamilton City Centre), Hamilton: This was a postmodern atrium connected to Jackson Square that opened in 1990. Unlike most communities subjected to ODRP projects, Eaton's had been present in Hamilton's downtown for many decades. The city had embarked upon a massive downtown urban renewal project in the 1960s and 1970s which cleared a dozen city blocks to build new commercial and civic buildings, particularly the 200+ store Jackson Square mall that would be connected to this future Eaton's store. In the first phase, a new Eaton's store opened in 1989, then the old Eaton's store was demolished so that the rest of the mall could be constructed over it. Despite Eaton's years of business in downtown Hamilton, this new Eaton's location was never successful. Now renamed "Hamilton City Centre", the majority of the mall houses independent local retailers. Hamilton City Centre closed on December 26, 2022, with the intent of demolishing it for condominiums. However, the developer placed the plans on hold due to high interest rates and market conditions, so the mall remained standing a year later.
- Guelph Eaton Centre (now the site of Sleeman Centre and Old Quebec Street Mall), Guelph: With the departure of Eaton's, this mall was redeveloped as the Guelph Centre. The former site of the Eaton's store now houses the Sleeman Centre, a large ice rink, where the Guelph Storm, an Ontario Hockey League team play their home games, while the rest of the mall was converted to a galleria-style pedestrian street called 'Old Quebec Street', with offices above the shops.
- Eaton Market Square (now Market Square), Brantford: Much of this mall has been converted to non-retail uses and is home to classrooms for Laurier Brantford students.
- Peterborough Square, Peterborough: The former Eaton's store now contains a Cineplex Galaxy movie theatre.
- Sarnia Eaton Centre (later Bayside Centre), Sarnia: This mall opened in 1982 but suffered from stiff competition from the existing suburban Lambton Mall. The original landlord Cadillac Fairview sold the property in 1996, while Eaton's departed in 1997—5 years short of its intended 20-year lease—followed by the closing of the A&P supermarket in 2000. Renamed the Bayside Mall after the departure of Eaton's, the vacant three level department store has been converted to office space, while most remaining tenants have been independent retailers and non-profits. Demolition of the mall commenced on June 18, 2021, and the site will be replaced by retirement homes to be completed in 2026.
- Kitchener Market Square, Kitchener: Opened in 1974. The former Eaton's store (moved in 1977 from former location at 276 King Street West - now Eaton's Lofts) and later Sears store has since been converted to offices, as has much of the remainder of the mall.
- Galleria London (formerly Wellington Square; now Citi Plaza), London: This was the last to be developed under the ODRP. Originally, it opened in 1960 as "Wellington Square" with 400,000 sq. ft. of leasable area, with Eaton's and Woolworths as anchors. From 1986 to 1989, Campeau expanded Wellington Square into Galleria London with 1,000,000 sq. ft. of leasable area and 200 stores including a new Hudson's Bay location. However, the early 1990s recession, following by the bankruptcy of Eaton's in 1999 and then the departure of the Bay in 2000 resulted in only 20 stores left by 2001. Galleria London then begun seeking non-retail tenants, becoming the home for London's central library branch, and satellite campuses for both Fanshawe College and Western University. The complex was purchased and renamed to Citi Plaza by Citigroup in 2009. Citi Plaza has been redeveloped as a mixed use complex that blends retail, office, businesses, and education providers. Alongside Citi Cards Canada's offices, in November 2016, CBC announced plans to move its expanded operations into the building. From a 35 percent vacancy rate in 1993 during the recession, the complex was 94 percent occupied by 2020.
- Sudbury City Centre Mall, (now Elm Place) Sudbury: Opened in 1971.

== See also ==
- List of shopping malls in Canada
- List of largest shopping malls in Canada
