= Downtown Guelph =

Central business district of Guelph, Ontario, Canada

Coordinates: 43°32′45″N 80°14′57″W

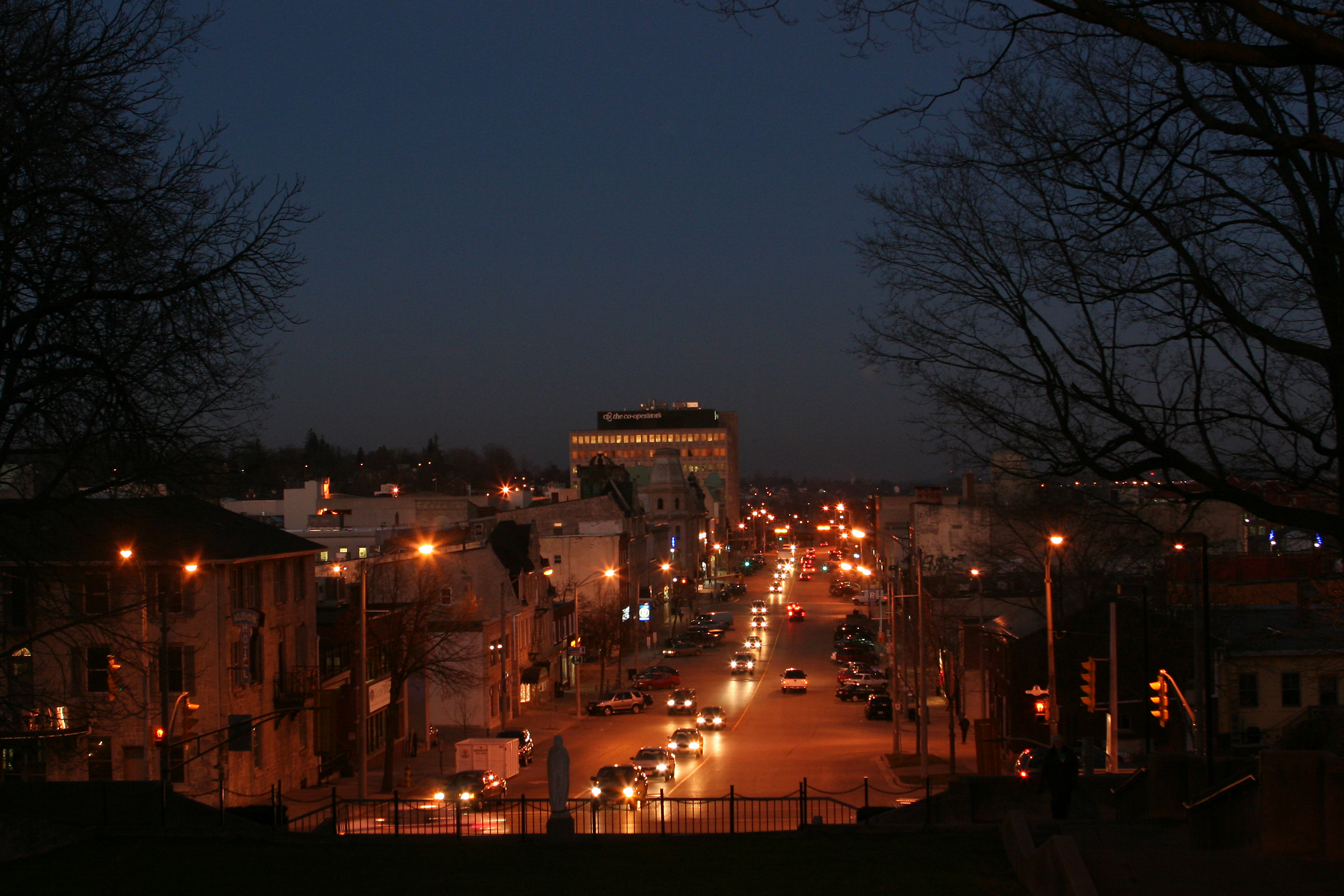
Downtown Guelph

Downtown Guelph is the central business district of Guelph, Ontario, Canada. It is bordered by Wellington St. E. to the south, Woolwich St. to the East, Dublin St. to the west and Norwich St. to the North. Downtown Guelph is known for its distinctive limestone architecture and heritage buildings. Many of Guelph's historically designated properties are in or near the downtown area.

== History ==
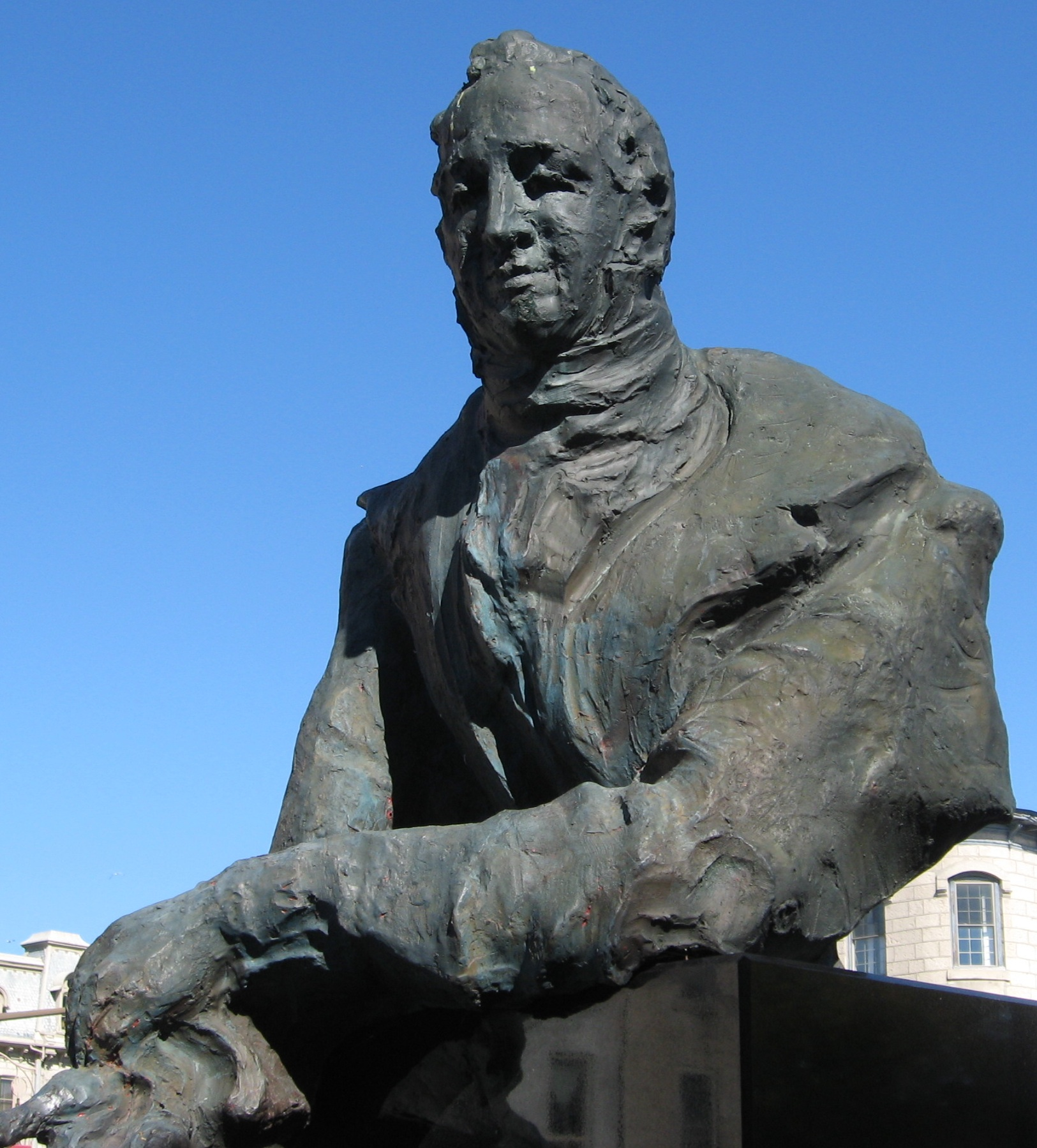
Bust of John Galt, downtown Guelph

John Galt, founder of Guelph, assisted by his surveyor, planned the community. He plotted a series of large public "squares" of varied shape; this unique street design provided one of the earliest examples of town planning in Ontario. Tradition relates that John Galt, or one of his companions, laid his outstretched hand on a tree stump and predicted that the streets of the new town would radiate from a central point such as his fingers radiated from his palm. It is true that the main streets of downtown Guelph do follow such a pattern, but which came first, the legend or the plan, remains in doubt.

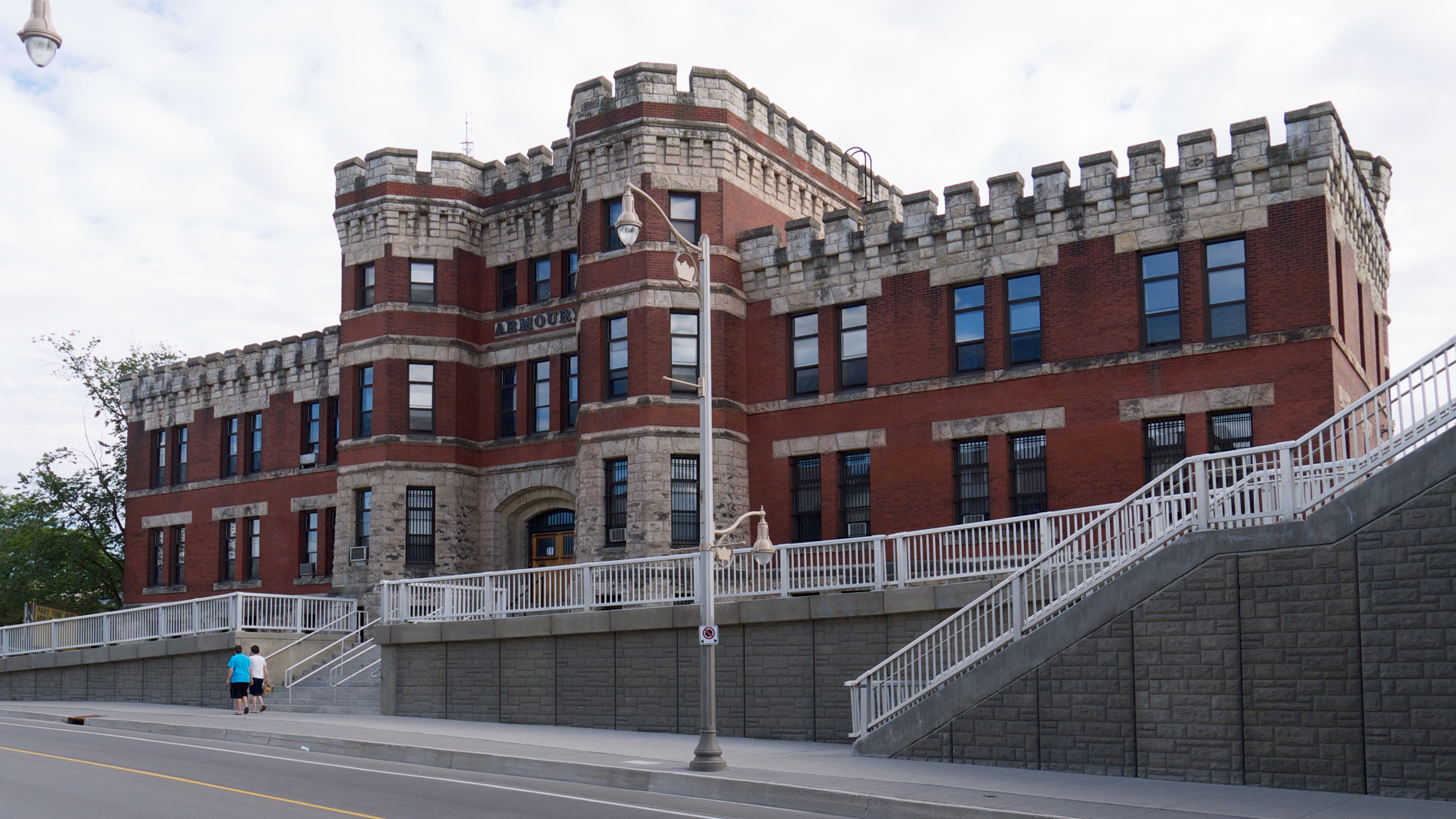
Guelph Armoury

Several downtown streets are lined with Victorian era buildings, which are now well over a century old. Many of Guelph's historically designated properties are in or near the downtown area. The old City Hall on Carden St., built between 1856 and 1857, is a National Historic Site of Canada; this structure is an example of mid-19th century Renaissance Revival architecture. This building, as well as the Annex, built in circa 1865, are historically designated by the government of Canada. Other historically designated buildings in the area include the Winter Fair Building and the Guelph Armoury.

The Old Quebec Street Mall was a street built in the mid 1800s that was enclosed and covered; that work was completed in 1984 and the street became an indoor shopping mall.

== Present day ==
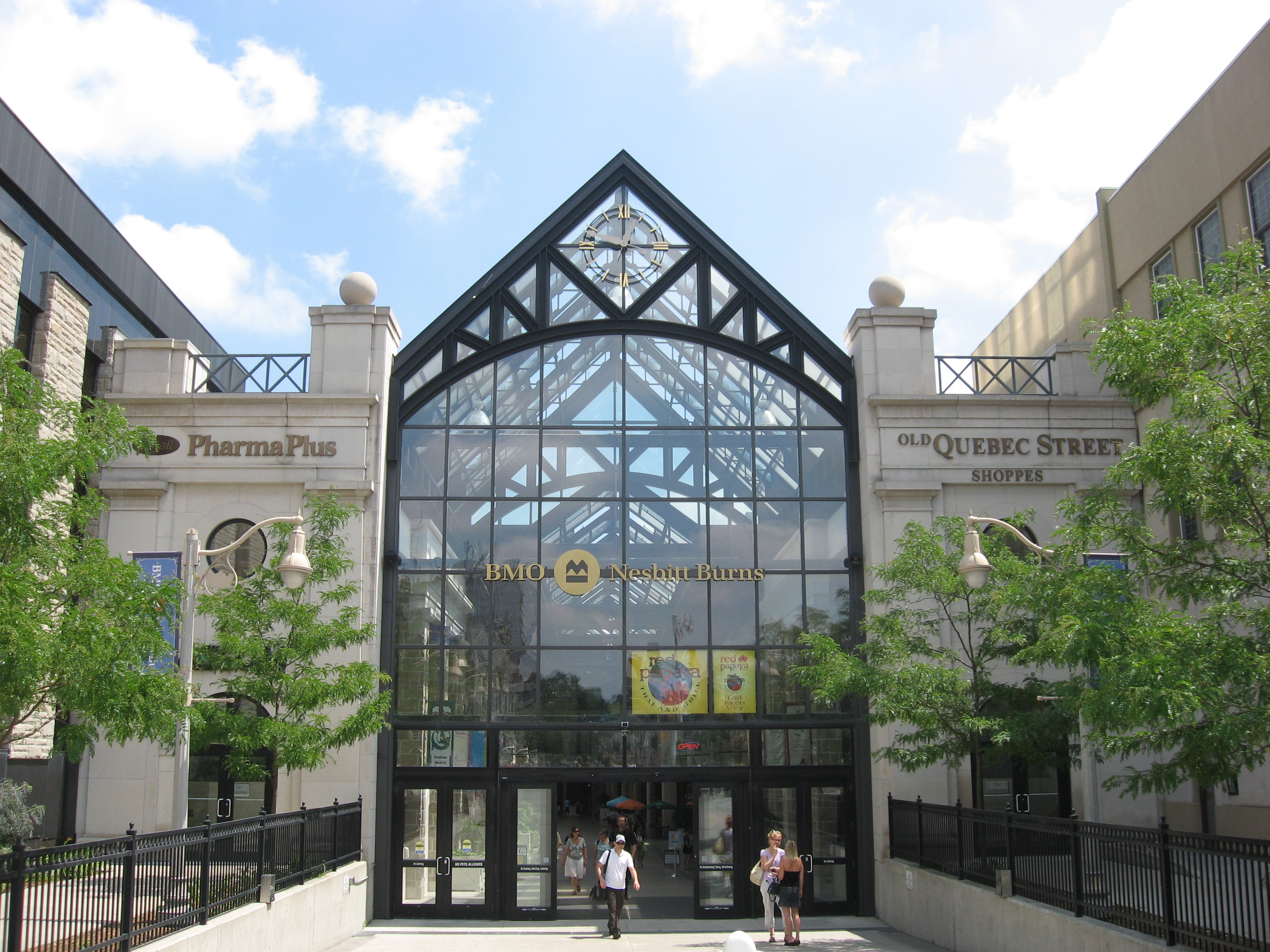
Quebec Street Mall

Downtown Guelph is a relatively concentrated area compared to other downtowns which run in a straight line like a Main Street. Downtown is very easily accessible by car, regional and local transit, walking, and by bike. It is the home of Guelph's largest concentration of retail, dining, financial services, as well as entertainment, healthcare, and professional services like lawyers and doctors.

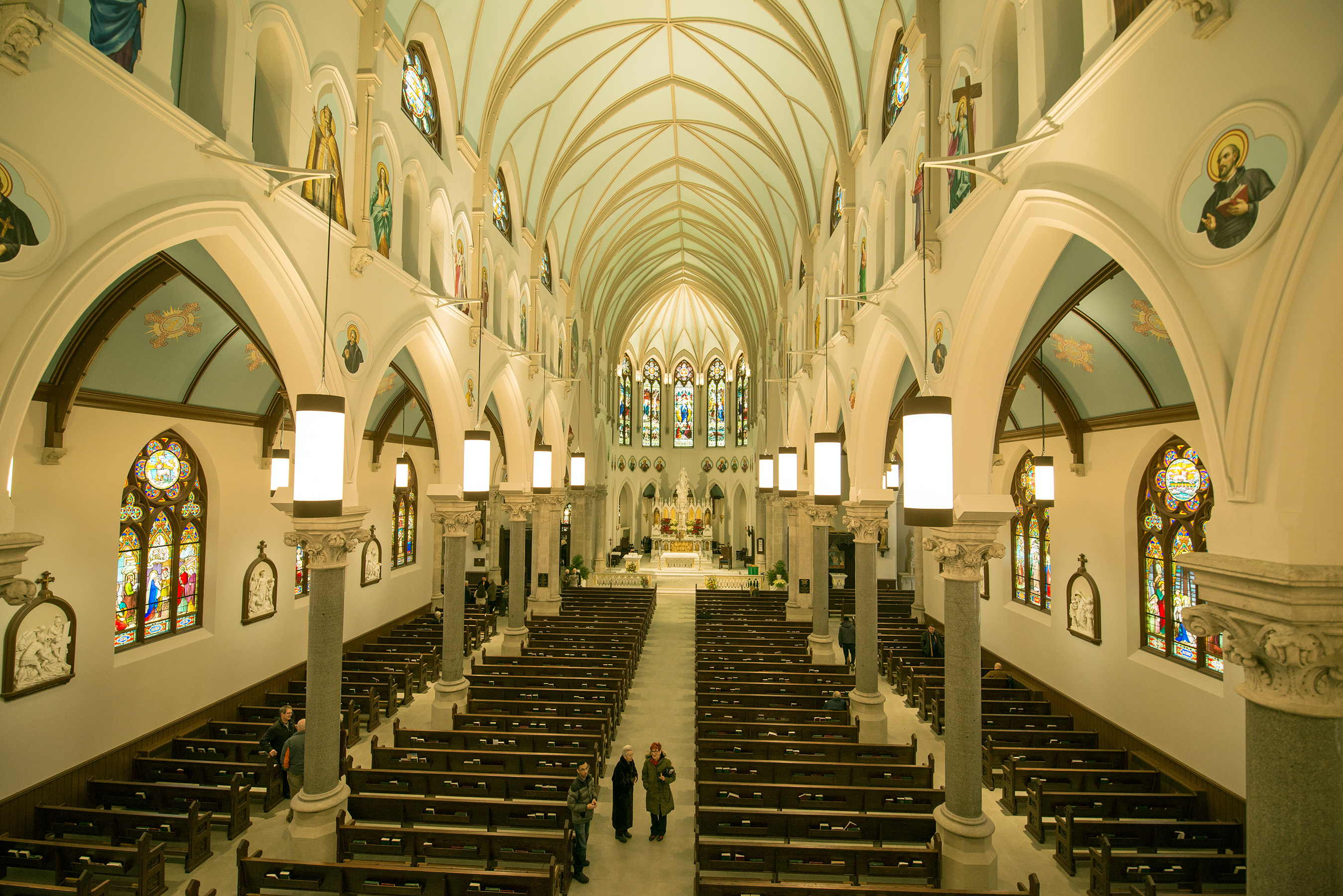
Interior of the Basilica, built between 1875 and 1883

In recent years the area has been experiencing a renaissance as the Business Improvement Area (BIA) has brought in new retail, created Old Quebec Street, and improved the cleanliness. For entertainment there is the River Run Centre, a cinema at the Bookshelf Cafe, the Sleeman Centre (home of the Guelph Storm), and a colourful array of amateur musical acts performing weekly at each of the smaller clubs/bars. Historical sites and landmarks include the Basilica of Our Lady Immaculate, Guelph City Hall, The Armoury, Guelph train station, and Douglas Street.

=== Planned redevelopment ===
A redevelopment plan for the downtown area had been discussed by Council since 2007 and was finalized as the 2018 Baker District redevelopment project. The plan is to transform the Baker St. parking lot and properties fronting Wyndham Street's north end into a mixed-use development, with urban intensification. Both residential and commercial buildings will be included. The final cost was estimated at between $315 million and $369 million. When finished, this area will include a new library, commercial, institutional and office space as well as an underground parking lot. The private enterprise partner for the project is Ottawa-based Windmill Development Group; there was also discussion about an additional partnership with Conestoga College and the Guelph YMCA. Actual construction was not expected to start until 2023. Before that date, up to $7.5 million will be spent to acquire the rest of the land that will be required.

== Notable sites ==
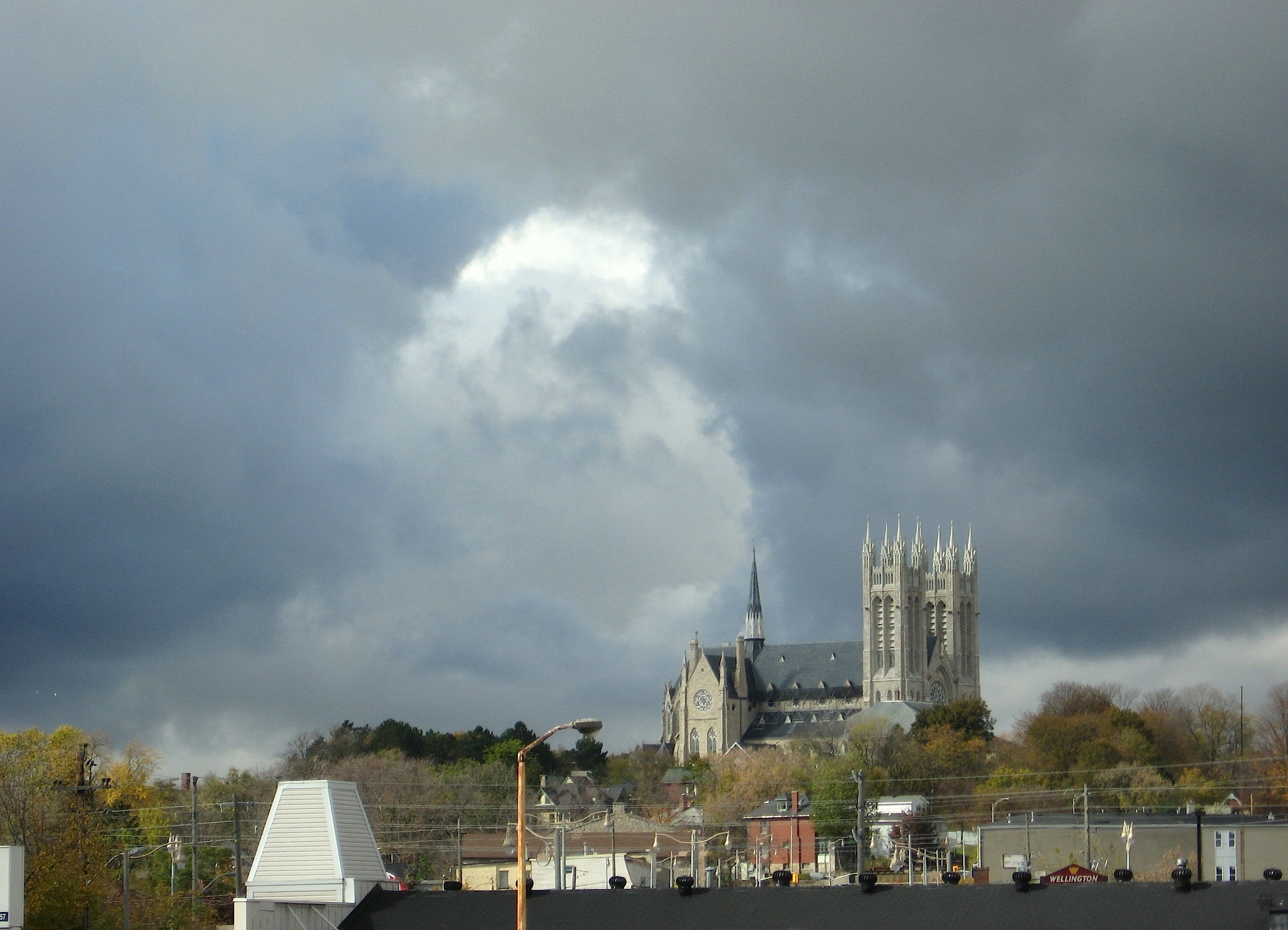
Church of Our Lady, Guelph, Ontario, from rivers confluence

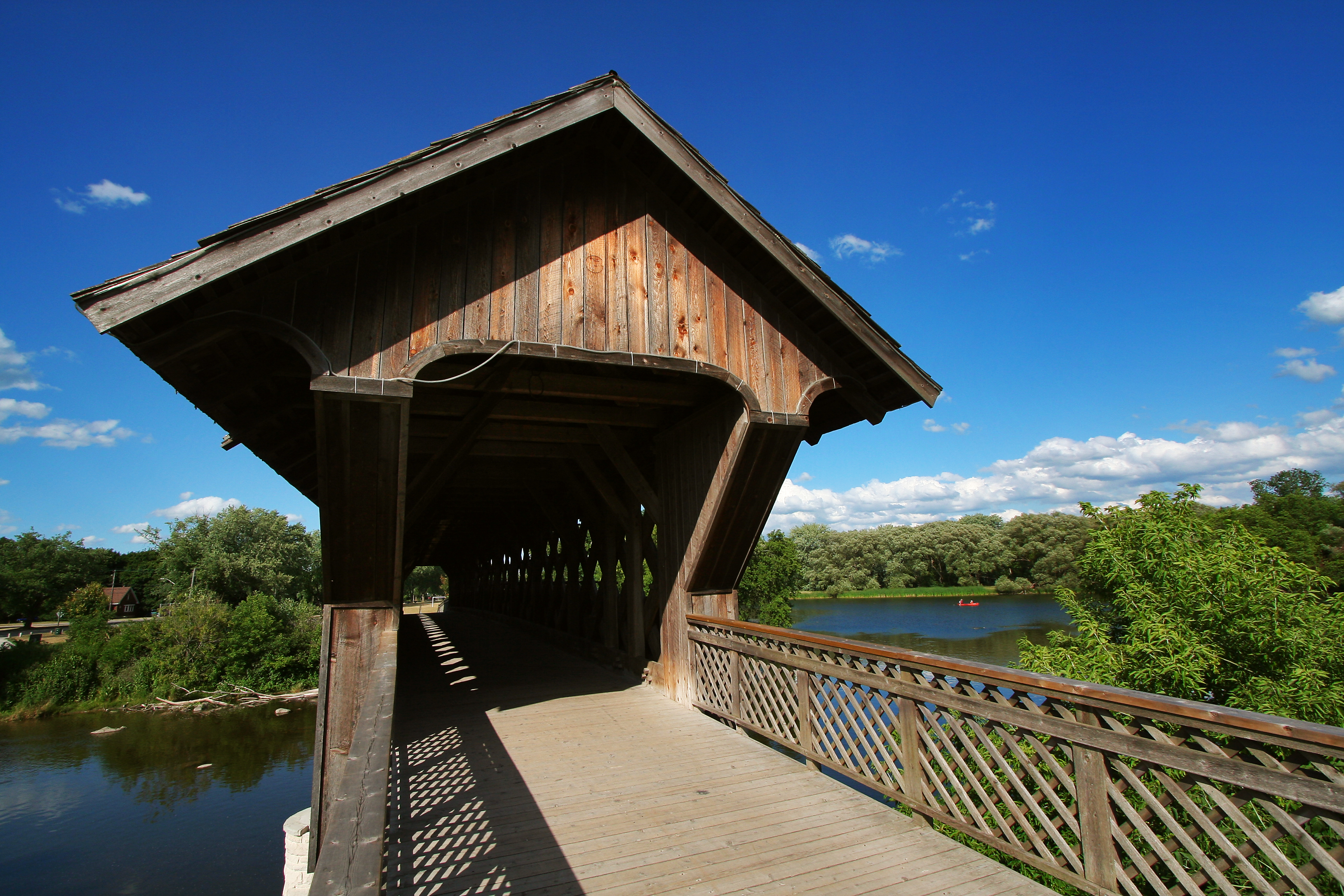
This covered footbridge near the city centre is one of only two in Ontario

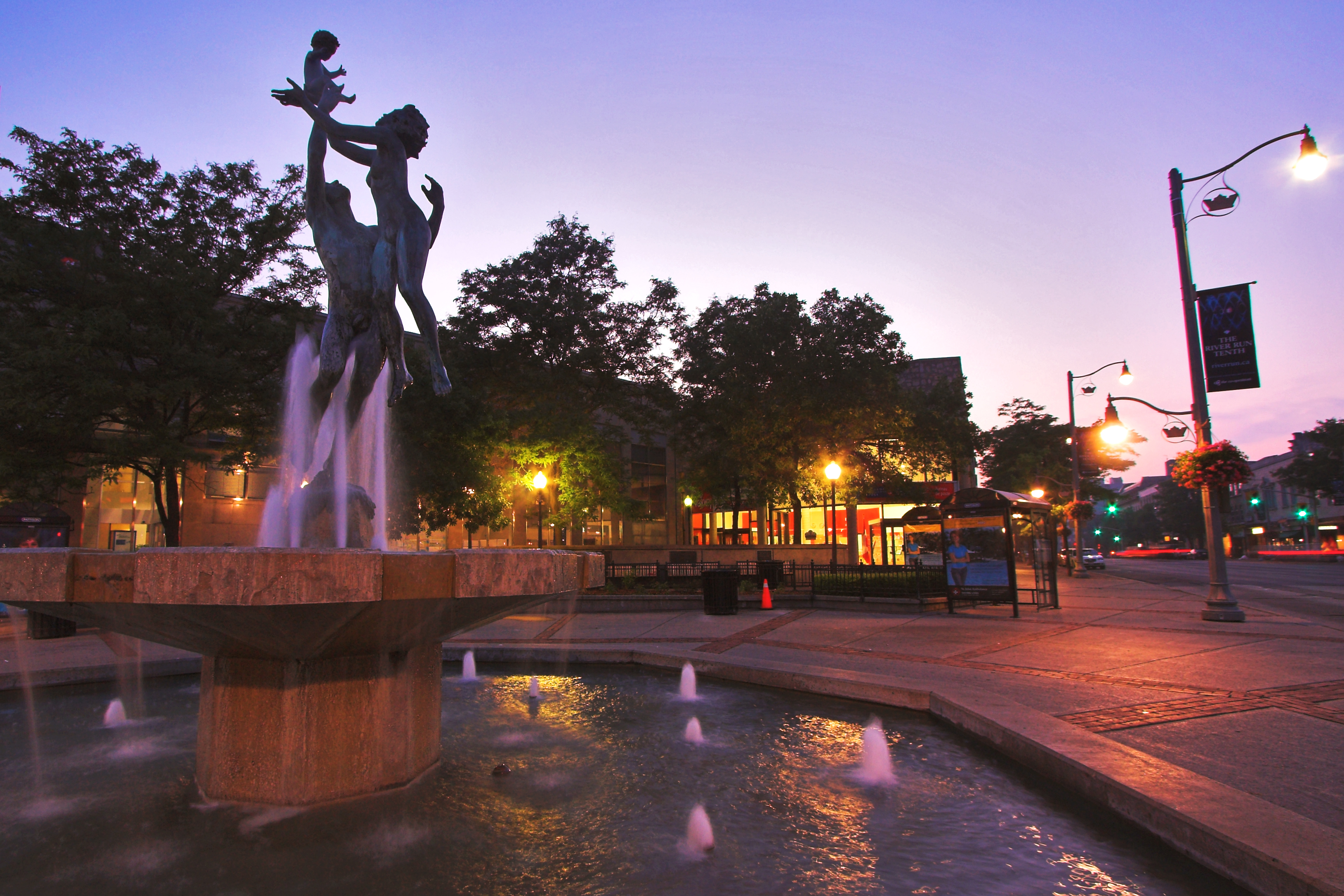
This statue entitled "The Family" by sculptor William McElcheran sits atop a fountain in the central square of Downtown Guelph

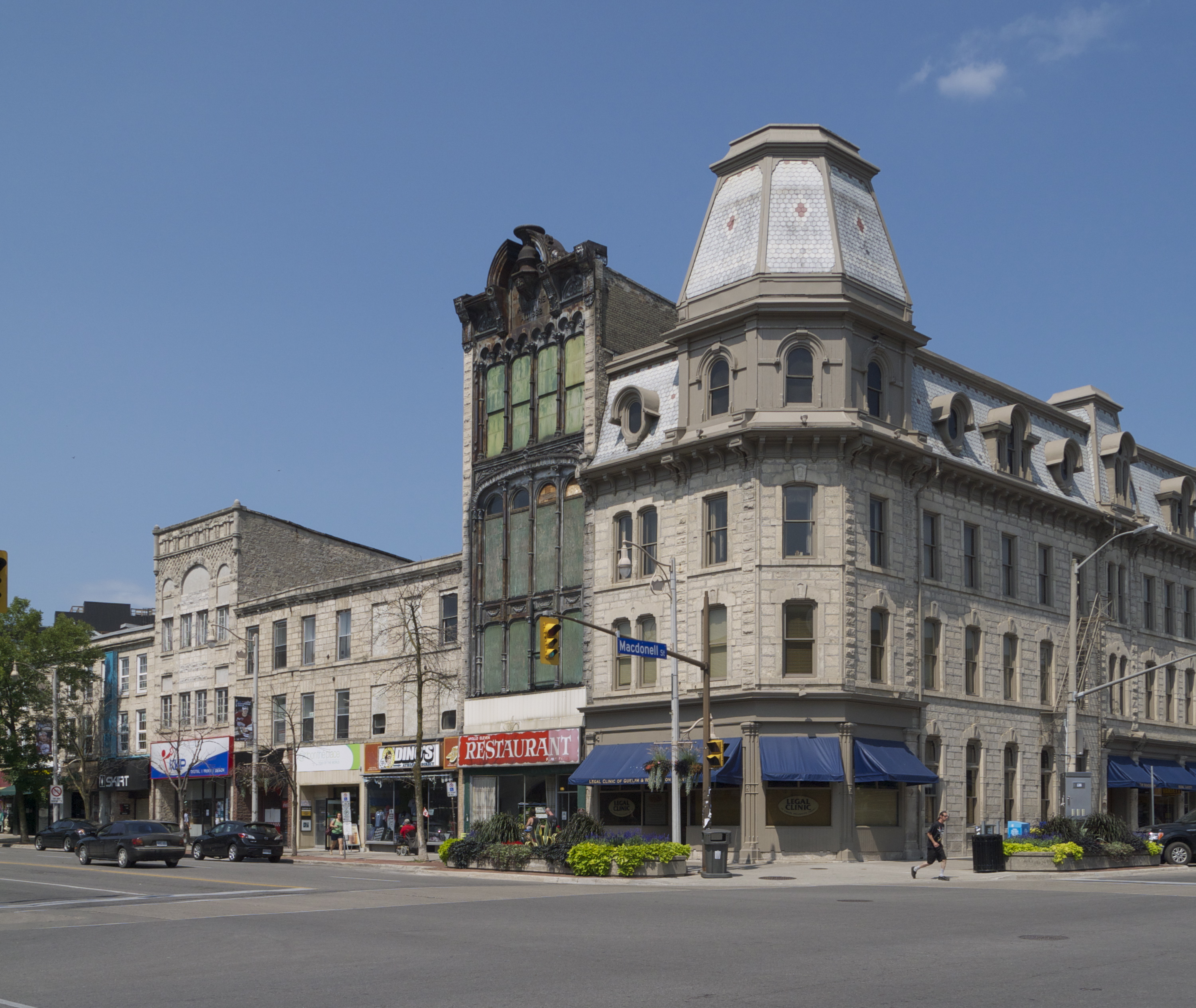
Intersection of Wyndham and Macdonell streets in Downtown Guelph. The Petrie Building built in 1882 is visible (with red "Restaurant" sign) .

There are many notable sites in Downtown Guelph, both historical and modern including:

- Sleeman Centre
- Basilica of Our Lady Immaculate, a National Historic Site
- Guelph City Hall, a National Historic Site
- The Armoury, a National Historic Site
- Guelph Central Station
- Douglas Street
- Old Quebec Street Mall
- Wellington County Courthouse
- River Run Centre
- St. Georges Square
- Royal City Park
- Guelph farmers market
- Wilson Street
- Guelph Public Library was the first public library established in Ontario under the Public Library Act of 1882.
- Covered footbridge

== Architecture ==
Over the years many examples of fine architecture have contributed to the enrichment of the downtown area's unique appearance. Talented masons and builders made excellent use of the fine, warm-hued limestone which was so easily worked by stone carvers. The local limestone has contributed a splendid unity and visual distinction to the architecture of the community. Many fine examples of historic stone architecture remain intact and in a state of commendable preservation.

The post-World War II era saw many older buildings in St. Georges Square demolished and replaced by modern buildings. Other parts of downtown also had these modern pieces put in. Citizens rallied to start saving downtown Guelph's historic buildings and have protected many from being lost.

== Education ==
Downtown Guelph used to be home to one high school, Bishop Macdonnell, which sat beside the Church of Our Lady. There is currently one public school within the downtown core, Central Public School located on Dublin Street

== Guelph Public Library ==
In 1882, the Ontario government passed the Free Libraries Act, allowing municipalities to establish libraries supported by local taxes. The City of Guelph was the first in Ontario to take advantage of this Act. The Guelph Library attempted to seek suitable quarters and moved to its current location on the corner of Norfolk and Paisley. Guelph was one of the first communities to take advantage of grants made available by steel magnate Andrew Carnegie.

Guelph is served by a growing library system composed of a main branch located in the downtown core, five branches and a Bookmobile. It holds a membership of over 85,000, the Guelph Public Library system's goals include preserving and indexing public materials relating to the history of Guelph. Although no formal program has been developed, the library acquires municipal records of archival value from the City of Guelph.

The Guelph Public Library also offers a number of programs including a book club.

== Transportation ==
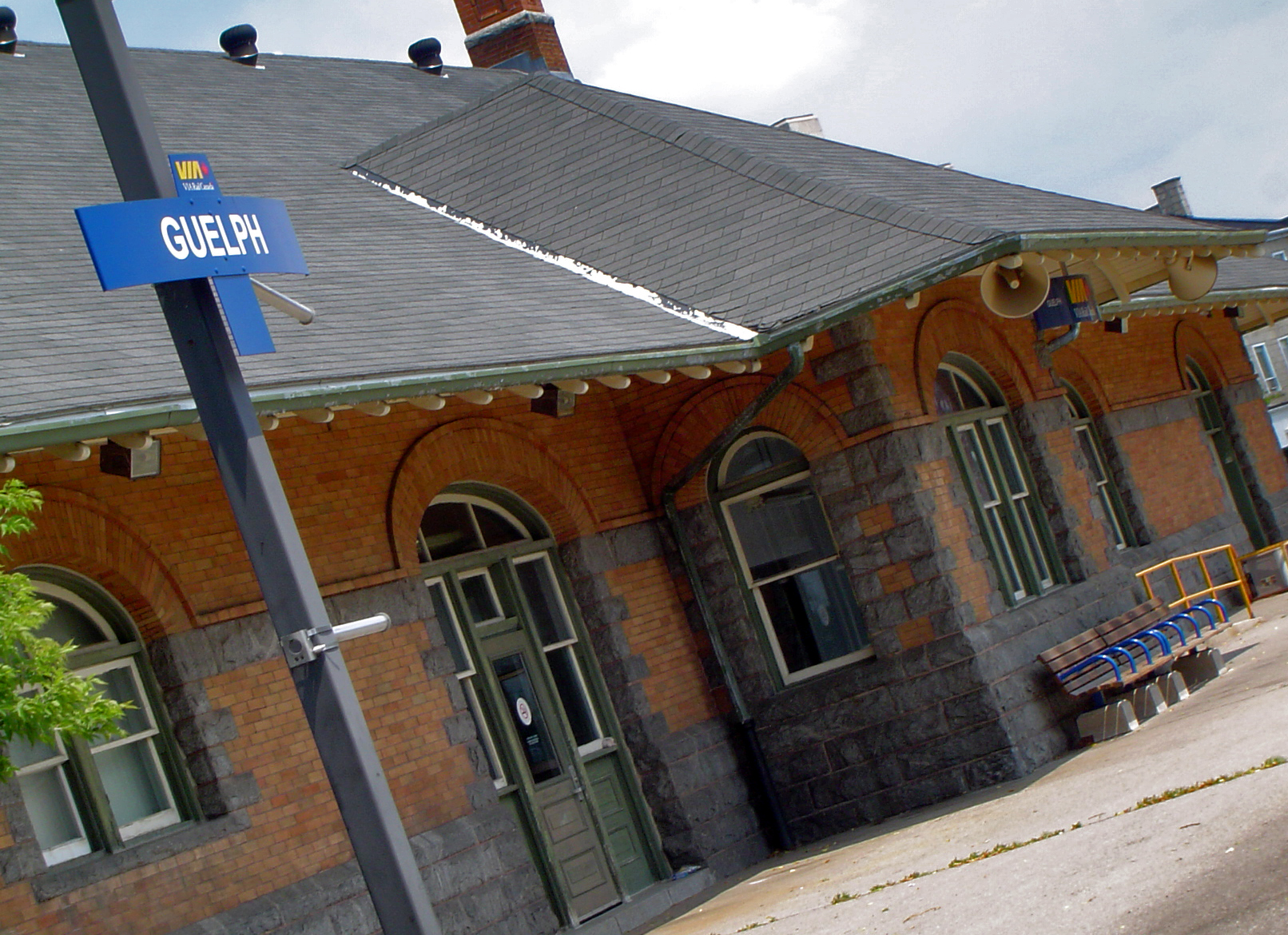
Guelph Train Station

Downtown is home to Guelph Central Station which combines local bus service of Guelph Transit with Via Rail and GO Transit services. Downtown is also easily accessible by bike, with bike paths connecting residents from all sides of the city into the centre.

== Gallery ==
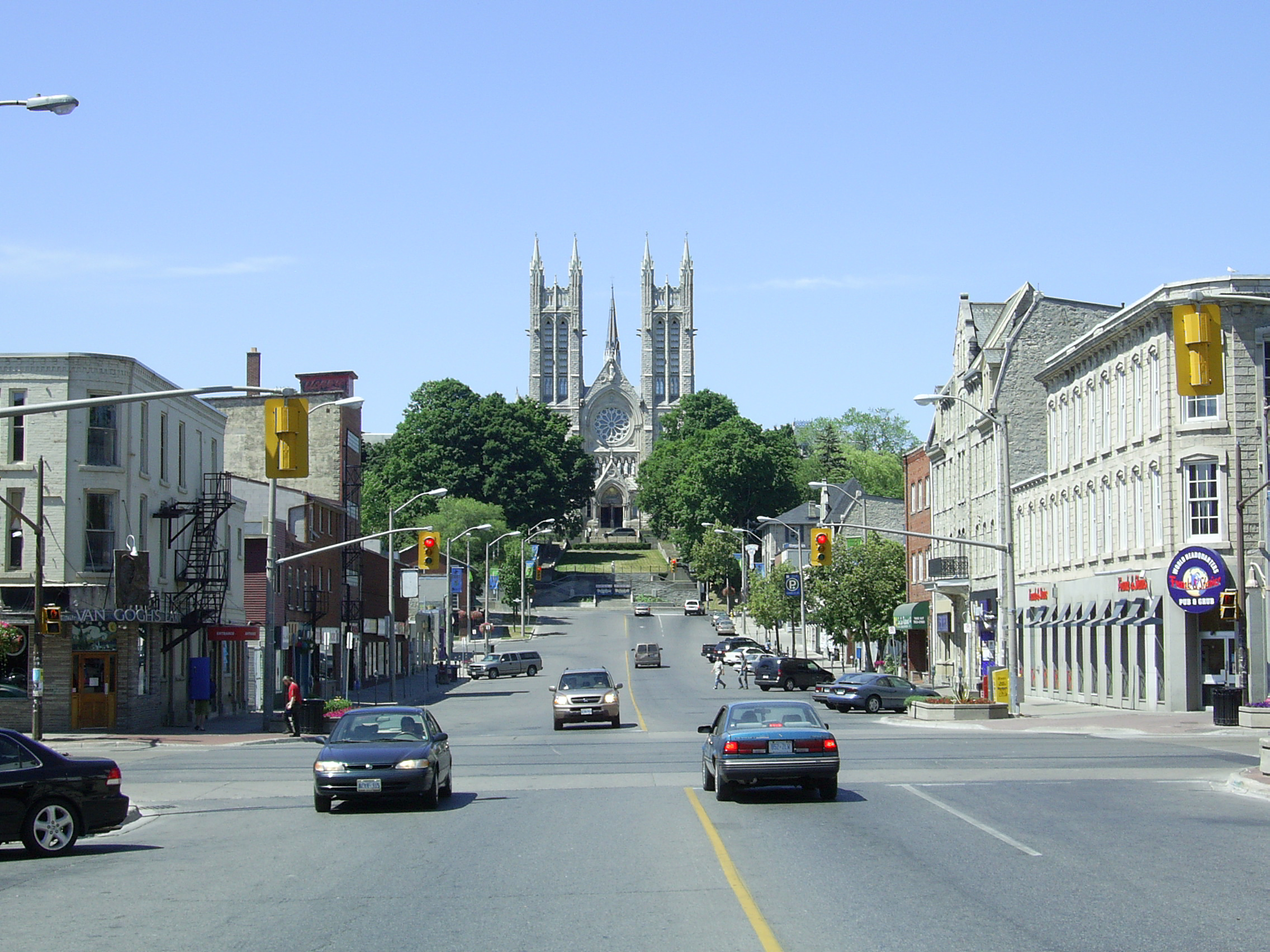
View of the Church of Our Lady from Macdonell St.

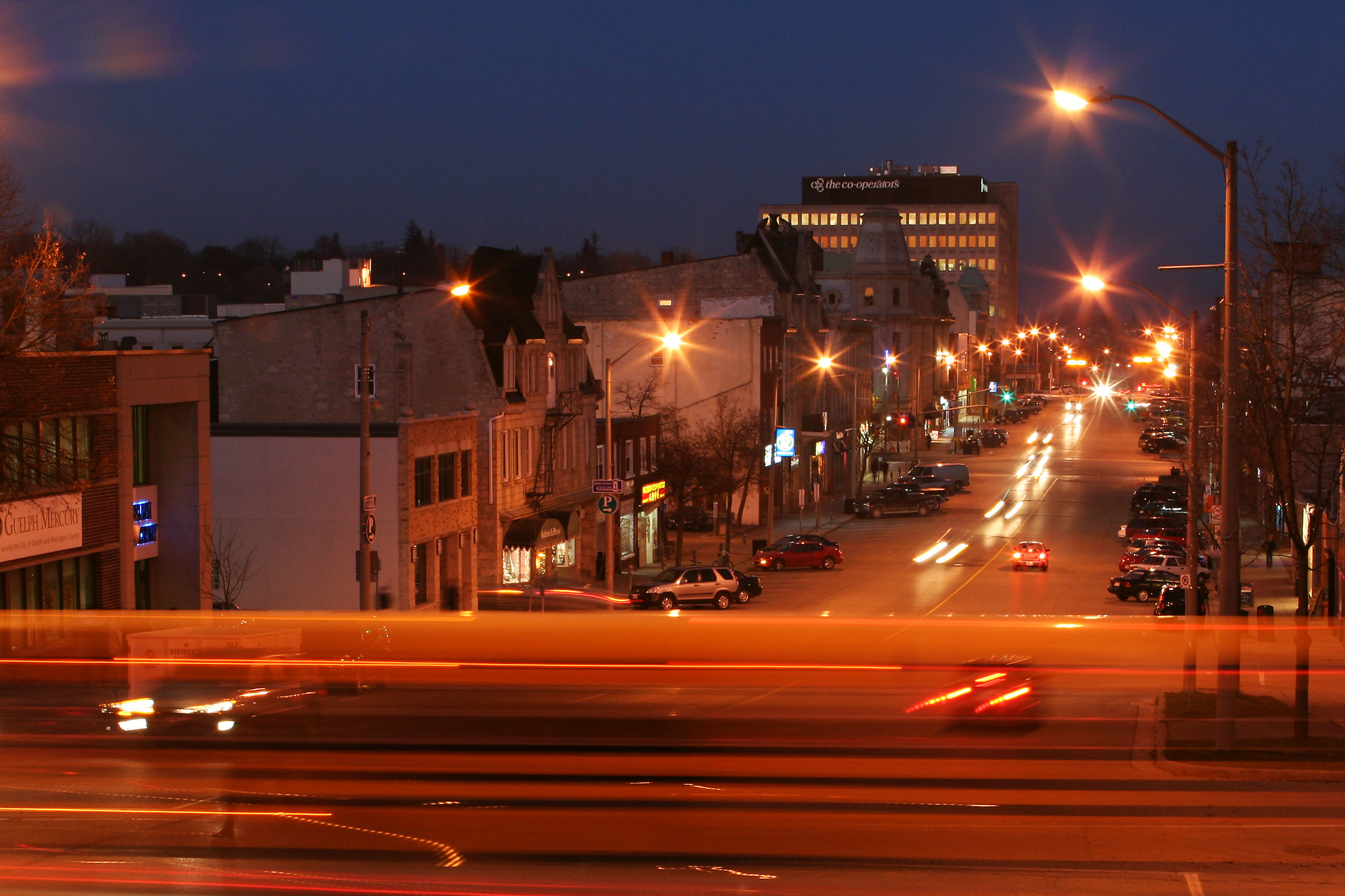
View of Macdonell St. in Downtown Guelph

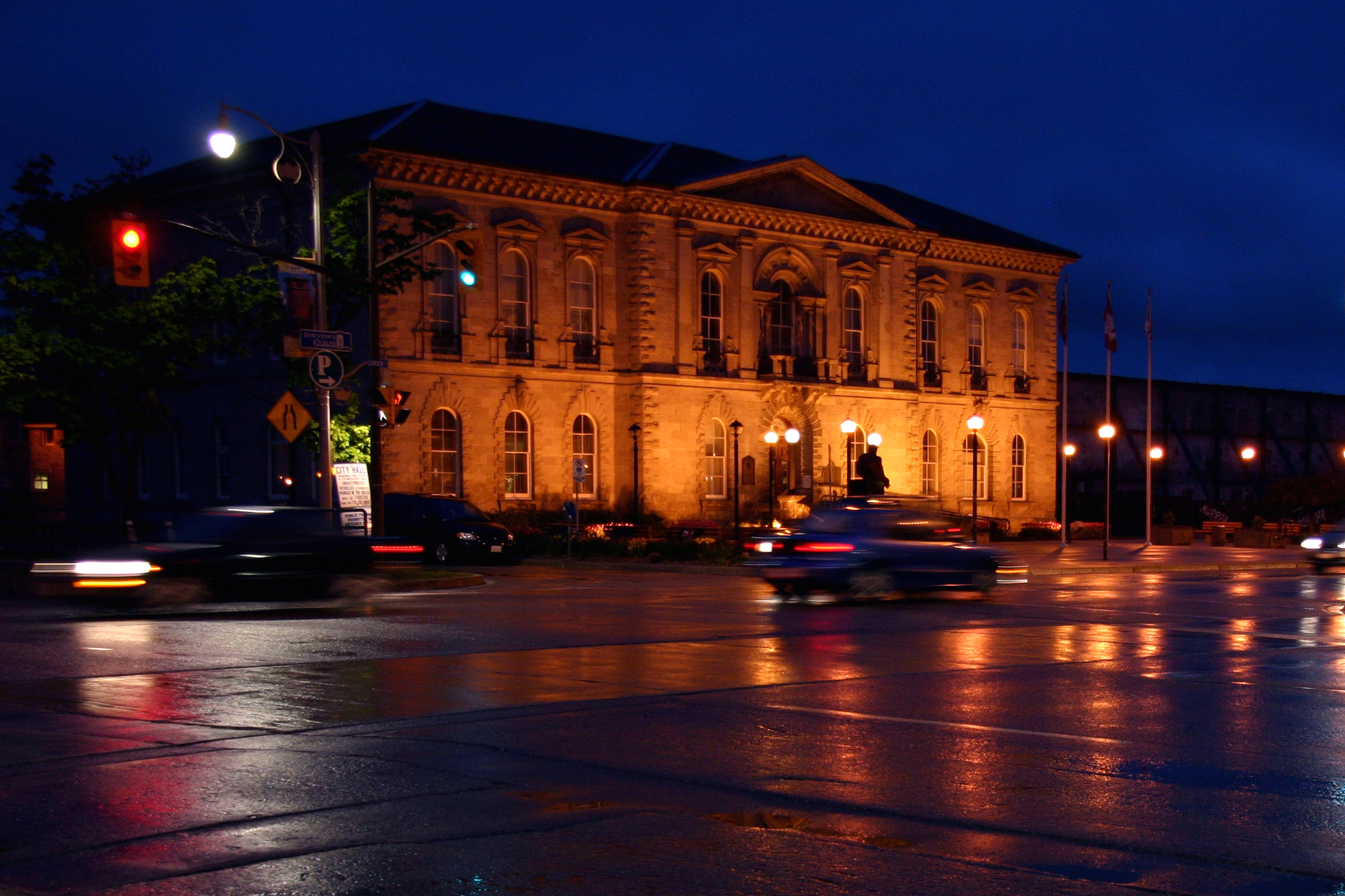
Guelph City Hall

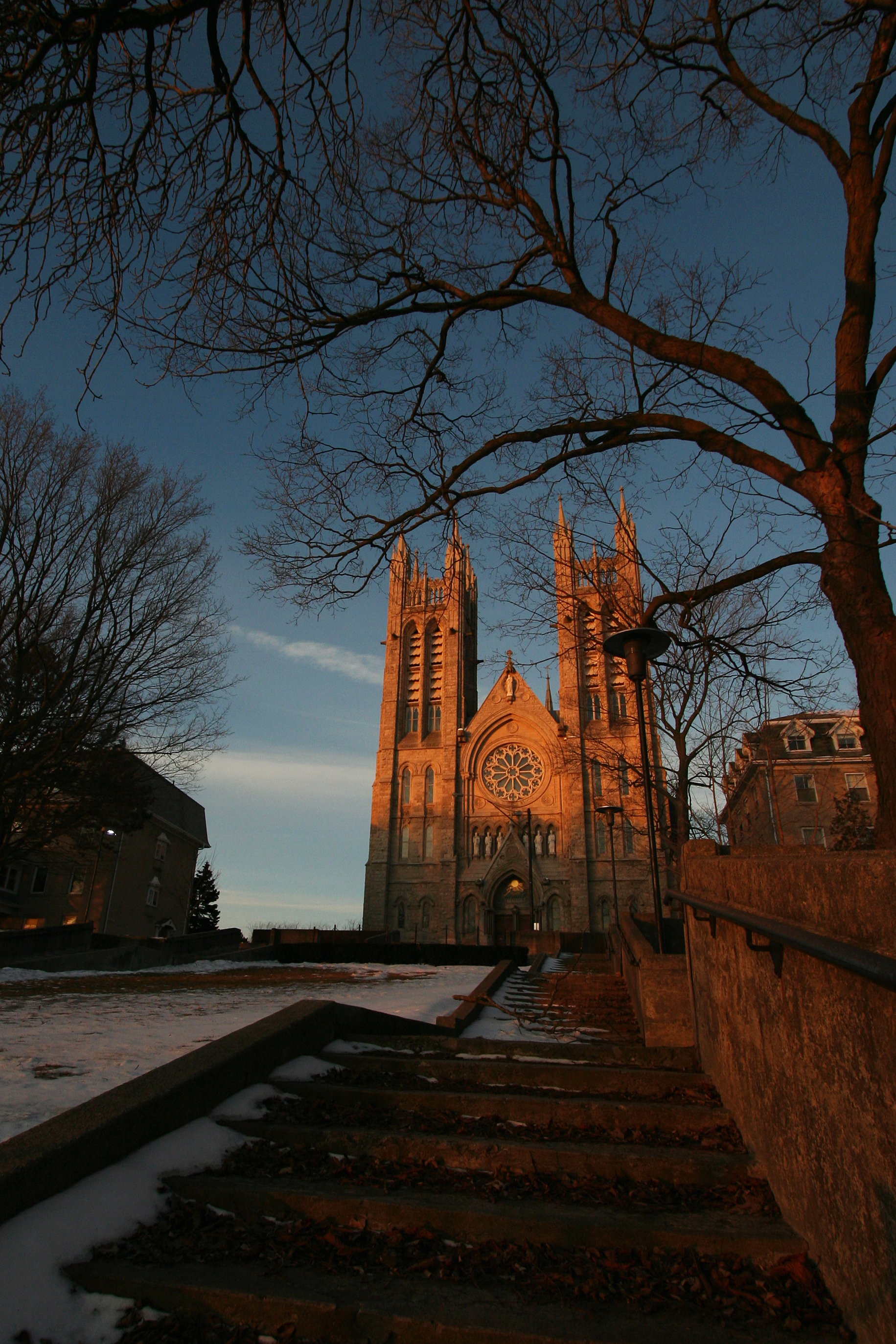
Basilica of Our Lady Immaculate
