= Old Quebec Street Mall =

Old Quebec Street Shoppes & Office Suites
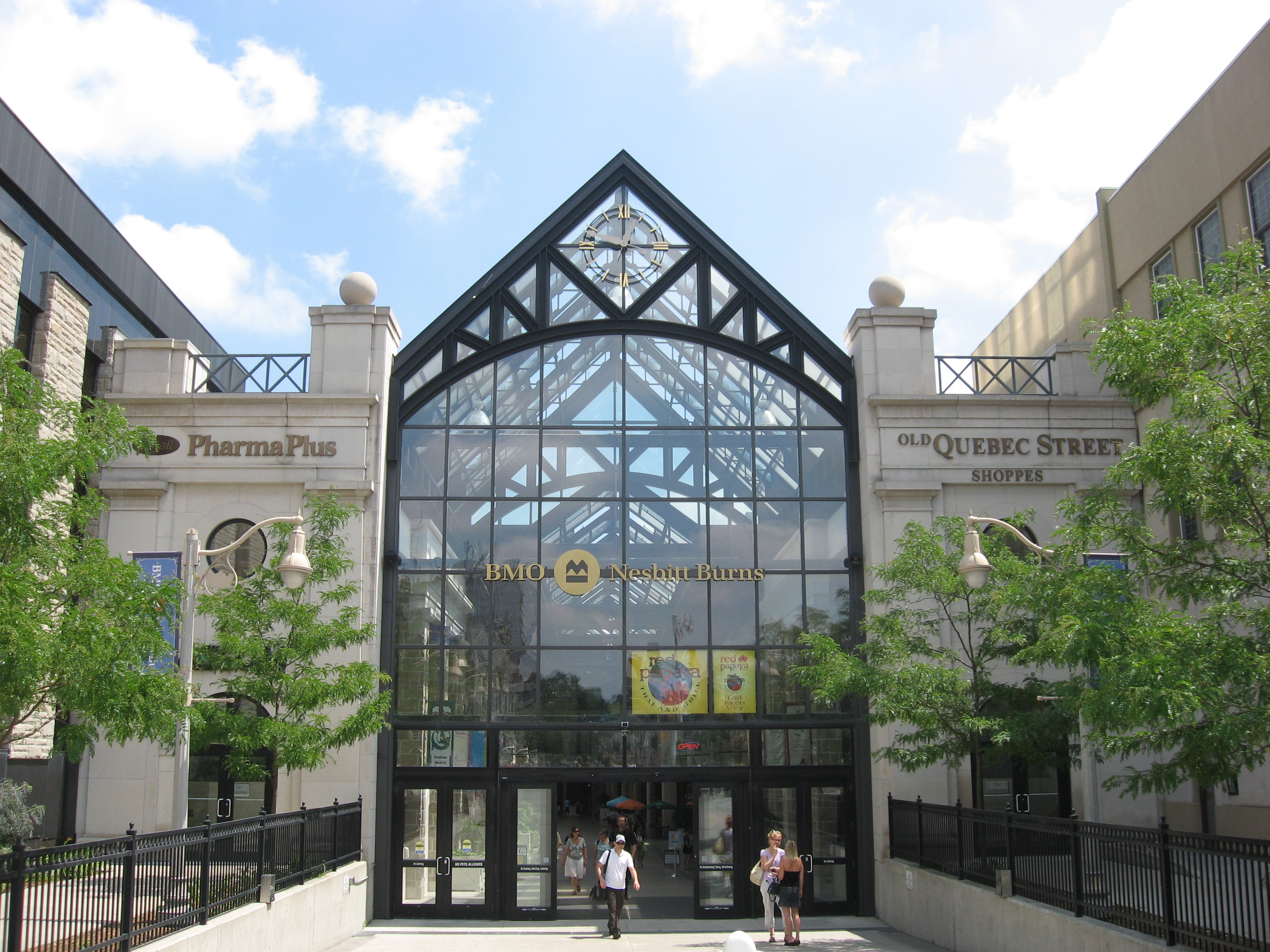
- The main entrance to the Old Quebec Street is on 55 Wyndham Street North
- Location: Guelph, Ontario, Canada
- Coordinates: 43.54615°N 80.24788°W
- Opened: Eaton Centre: 1984; Old Quebec Street: 2003
- Closed: 1999: Eaton Centre
- Floors: 2

Old Quebec Street Shoppes & Office Suites is a commercial mixed use building located on Wyndham Street North in downtown Guelph, Ontario, Canada. The main entrance faces the intersection of Quebec Street and Wyndham Street at St. Georges Square. Old Quebec Street Shoppes stands where Quebec Street originally extended east of Wyndham Street. The back entrance of the building leads out onto Woolwich Street next to the Sleeman Centre.

== Description ==
Old Quebec Street Shoppes & Office Suites has two floors, with retail shopping on the lower level and office/medical space on the upper level. The West Parkade attached to the building provides visitor parking.

== History ==
Guelph was established by John Galt and the Canada Company in the 1820s. Quebec Street was one of the original streets named in Guelph. Quebec Street extended east and west of Wyndham Street North having several store fronts and services until about 1980. From 1980 to 1984, Quebec Street east of Wyndham Street North was closed off to build a mall, which officially opened in 1984 as an Eaton Centre. The demise of the Eaton's company in 1999 resulted in the sale of the mall to the city, which renamed it the Guelph Centre. The back wall of the Eaton's store was torn down, and the space was rebuilt as the Sleeman Centre. The remaining portion of the Eaton Centre became The Old Quebec Street Shoppes & Office Suites, which opened in 2003.

=== Architecture ===
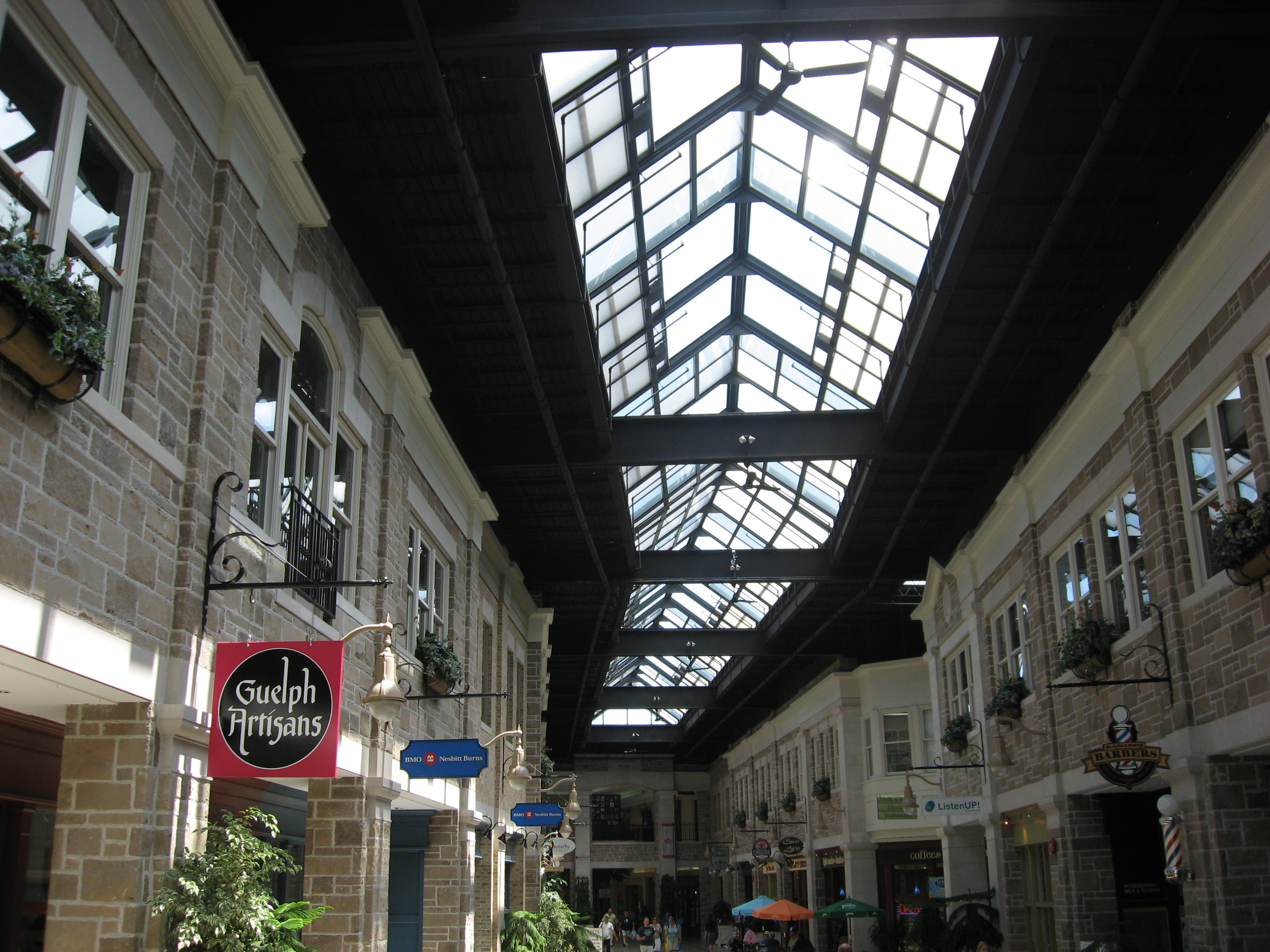
The skylights over the shops in Old Quebec Street make a visitor feel as though they were outside.

Old Quebec Street Shoppes & Office Suites displays a unique architecture, making visitors feel like they stepped in a historic town's main street as an indoor version of the traditional marketplace. The building is full of antique architectural style. The distinctive interior design has a high skylight roof, exposed bricks, and decorations of wrought iron window boxes and banners surrounding it to create an historic atmosphere influenced by the old limestone and brick buildings commonly found in downtown Guelph. It is meant to resemble the old Quebec Street with outdoor store fronts before the original Eaton Centre was built.

== Stores and services ==
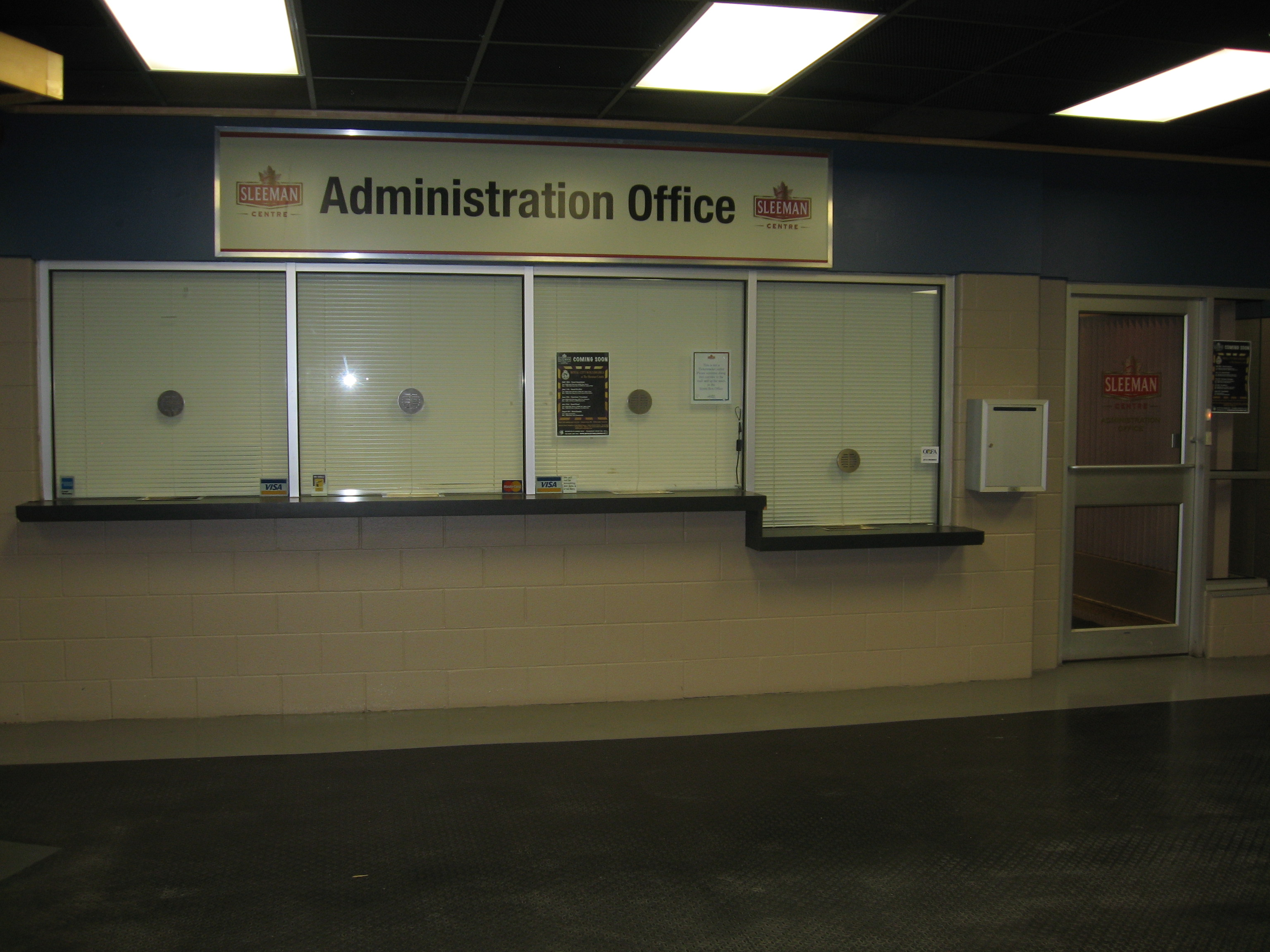
The Sleeman Centre Ticketmaster

Old Quebec Street Shoppes and Office Suites has numerous cafes, stores and services.

=== Access ===
Old Quebec Street is located at the center of downtown Guelph. The building's West Parkade is a fee-based visitor parking, and visitors may also access the mall by public transportation, including the many bus stops on Wyndham Street facing the mall's main entrance, and the nearby Guelph Bus Terminal.

=== The Guelph Storm Box Office ===
The hockey arena is located inside the Sleeman Centre with the box Guelph Storm box office located on the main floor within the Hall of Fame.
