= Guelph Farmers' Market =

Coordinates: 43.5424°N 80.2484°W

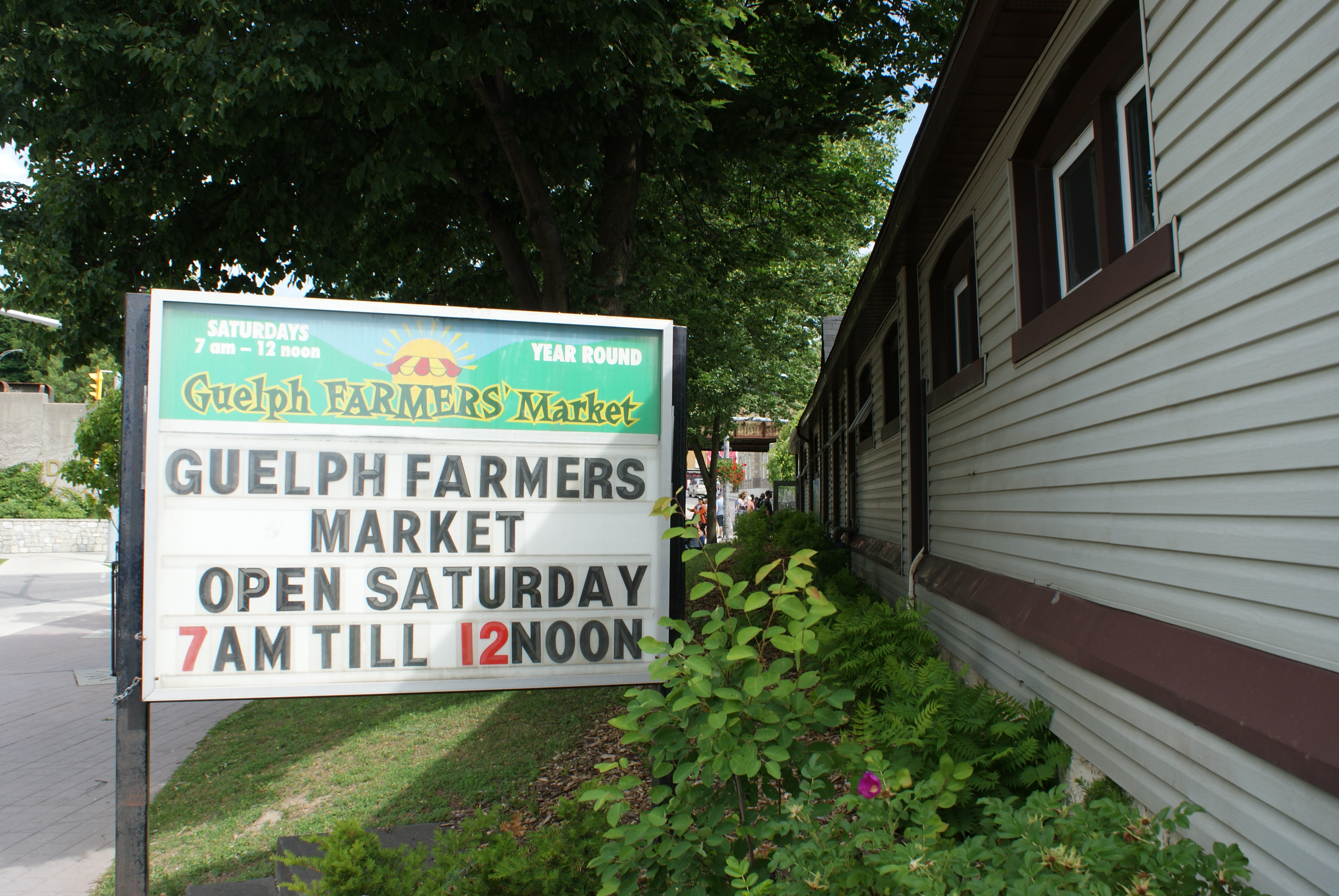
Outside the Guelph Farmer's Market.

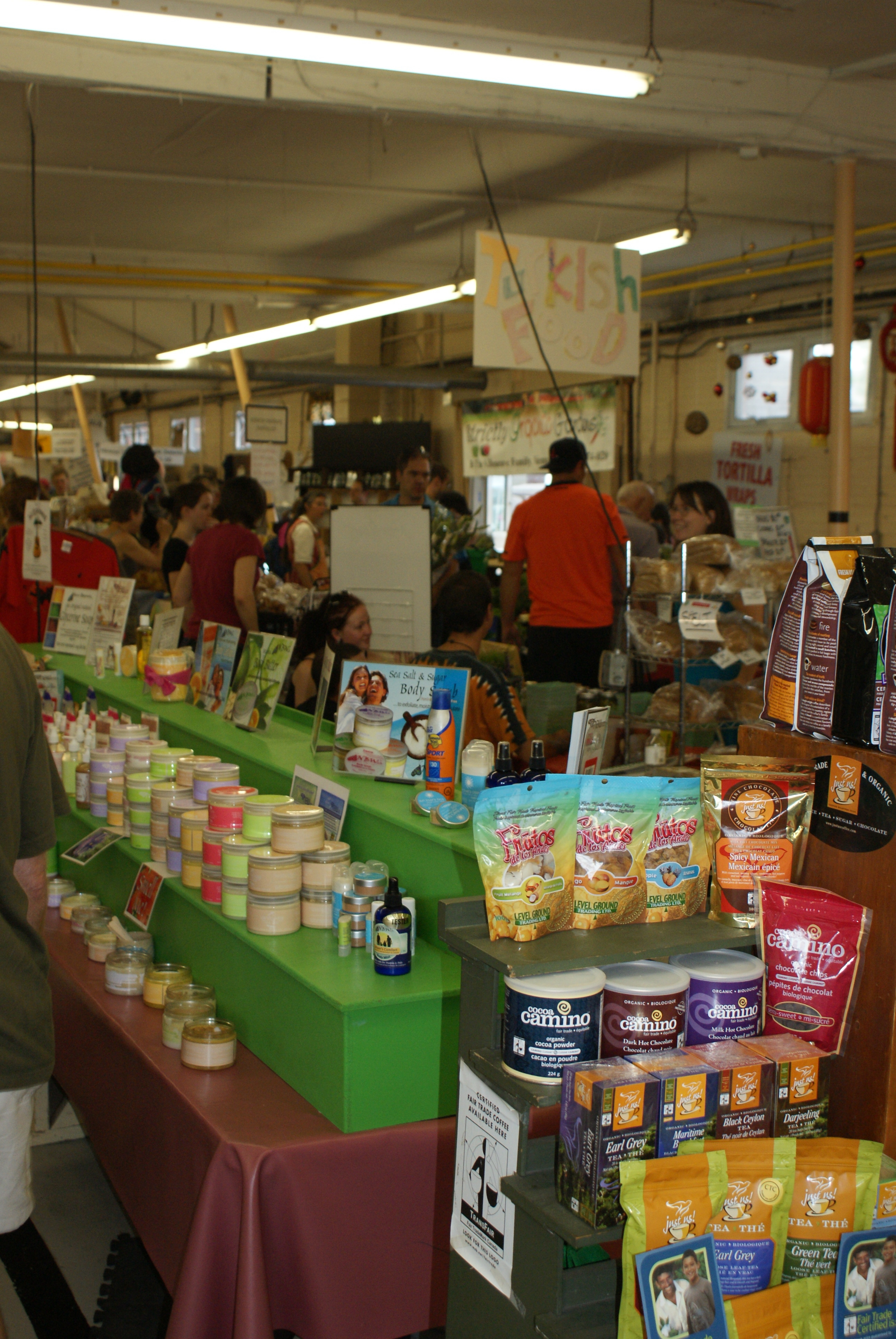
Inside the Market Building.

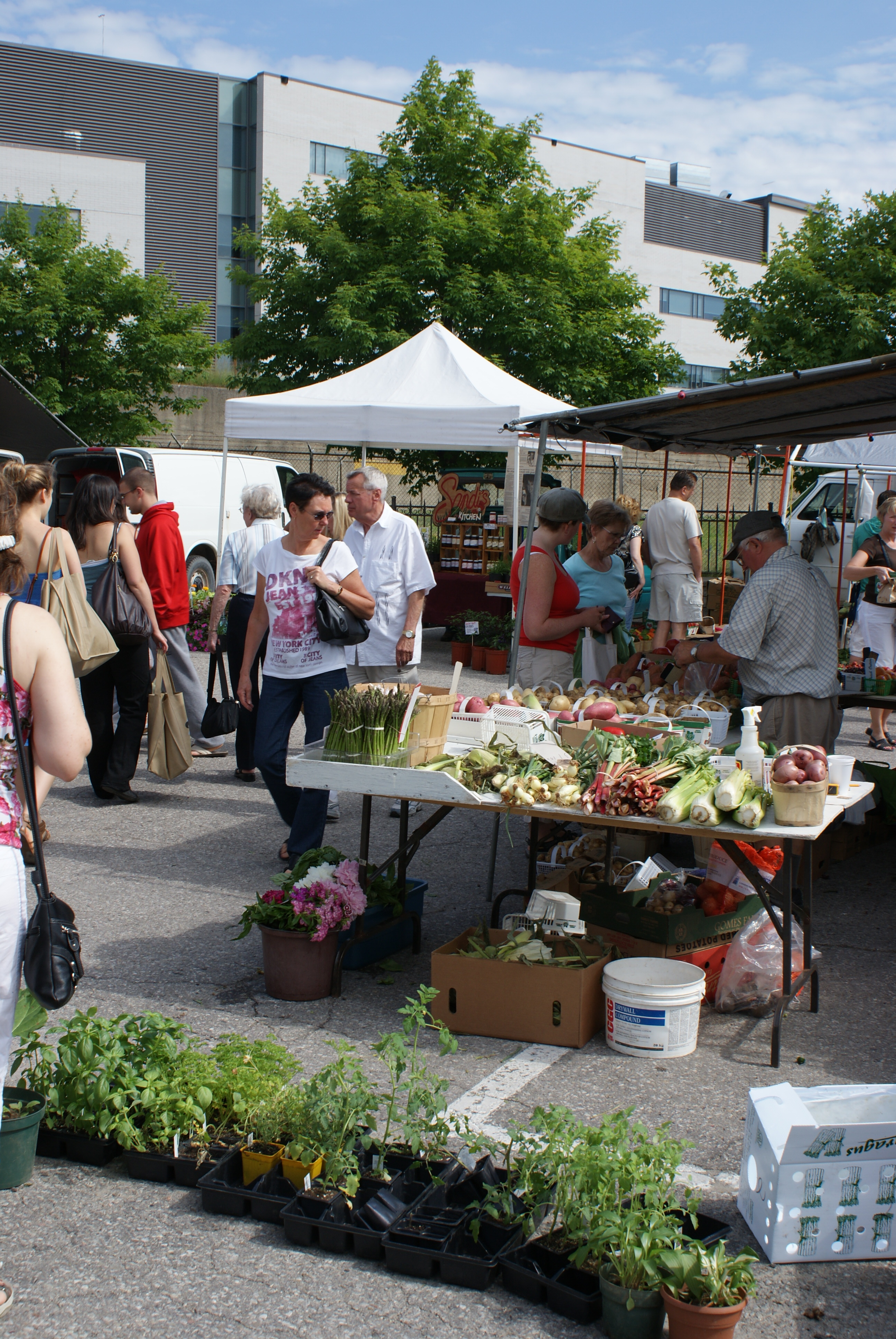
Outdoor Market.

The Guelph Farmers' Market in downtown Guelph dates to 1827 when the first Market House was built.

The market has been at the corner of Gordon St and Waterloo Ave in what was previously a show horse barn since 1968.

== History ==
The original Market House was erected in 1827 for the Canada Company whose Canadian Superintendent John Galt saw it as part of his vision to make Guelph the centre of Ontario’s farming industry. The location was determined, according to folklore, when Galt placed his hand, with fingers outstretched upon a tree stump and proclaimed that as his fingers radiated from his hand so too would the proposed streets of his new town. The building itself was a rather rough and primitive structure with a cottage roof, twelve sets of double posts of squared timber and open sides. The new Market Square also held an added benefit for the Canada Company; it created an increase in the land values for the area of which John had had the foresight to purchase before introducing his concept.

In 1857, after five years of political fighting between the merchants, tradesmen, farmers, and town officials, a new stone Market House/Town Hall was built to accommodate the growing market, municipal government offices, and local fire and police services. The Farmers' Market remained at Market House until 1968.

In 1968 the market moved to the Show Horse Barn, which was constructed in 1911 for the Provincial Winter Fair, while the Market House/Town Hall was rebuilt and re-purposed as the Guelph City Hall.

== Timeline ==
- 1827 – John Galt breaks ground on construction of the original Market House
- 1857 – The Market House/Town Hall is built to replace the original Market House which needed more space. A portion of this new building was used by town council, the local fire department and the police.
- 1874 – An addition is added that includes a second floor concert hall but the main floor remained home to the market
- 1902 – A second addition is added to the Wilson Street side of the building to house cattle, a lecture room, boiler room and poultry area.
- 1911 - The Show Horse Barn is built as part of the Provincial Winter Fair that made its home in Guelph in 1889
- 1939 – Buildings used for the Provincial Winter Fair are taken over by the Military to house soldiers and carry out training exercises.
- 1968 – The Show Horse Barn, no longer needed when the Provincial Winter Fair moves to Toronto and becomes the Royal Winter Fair, becomes the new home of the Farmers Market when it moves from Market House which was rebuilt to become City Hall.
- 2022 - Local organization, 10C Shared Space begins managing and activating the Market on behalf of the City of Guelph.

== See also ==
- Wellington County, Ontario Wellington Country
- Guelph/Eramosa, Ontario Township of Eramosa/Guelph
- Fergus, Ontario Township of Centre Wellington
