= Lambton Mall =

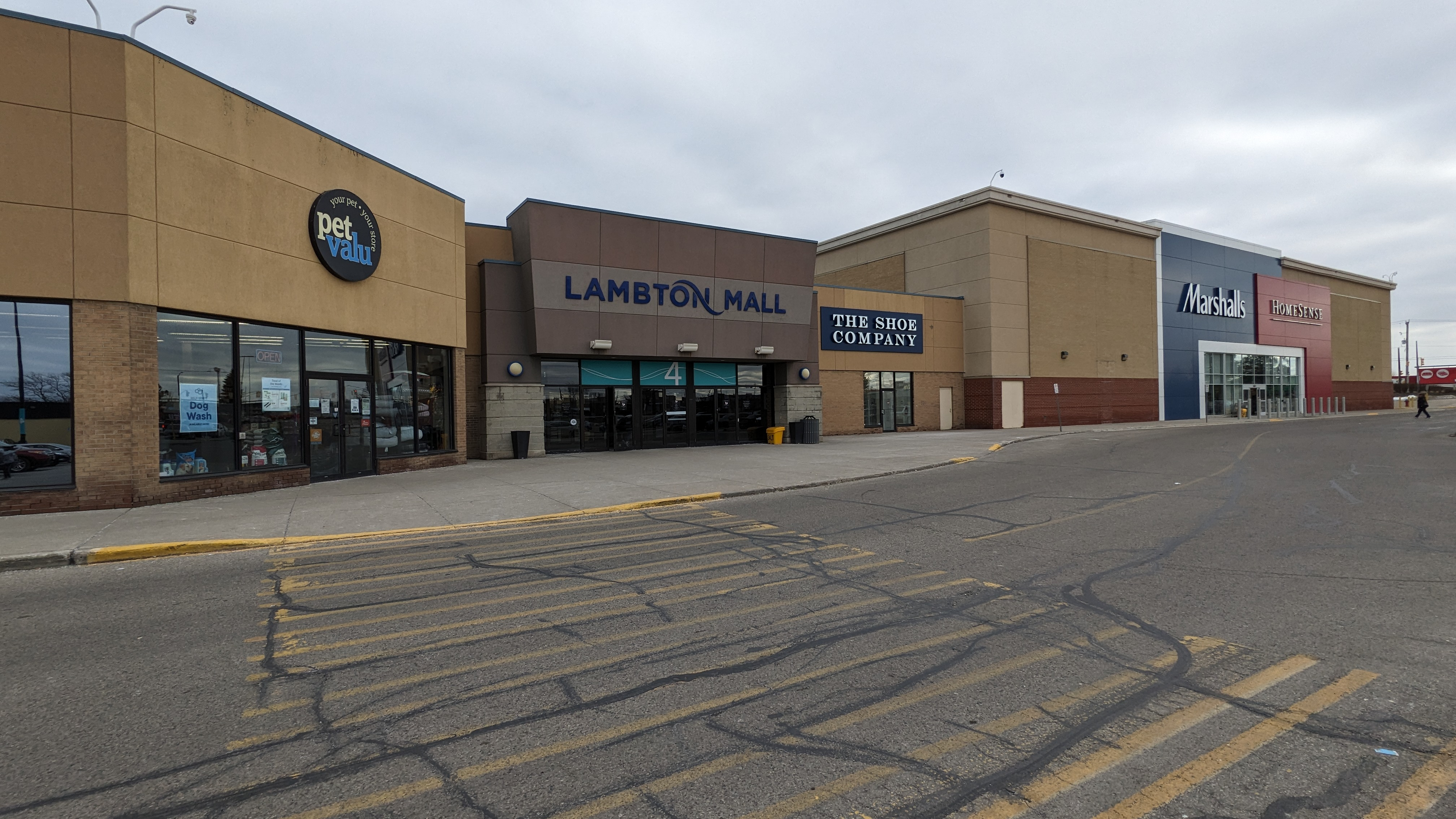
- Coordinates: 42.982°N 82.353°W
- Address: 1380 London Road; Sarnia, Ontario; N7S 1P8
- Opened: 1971
- Owner: Cushman and Wakefield
- Num. of stores: 74
- Num. of anchor tenants: 5
- Floor area: 589,887 sq ft (54,802.3 m^{2})
- Floors: 1
- Website: www.lambtonmall.com

Lambton Mall is a shopping mall located in Sarnia, Ontario, Canada, owned by Chicago real estate company Cushman and Wakefield. It opened in 1971 and, through several expansions, has grown to encompass over 580,000 square feet of retail space.

== History ==
Upon the store's opening, the main anchor locations were a Canadian Tire, a Dominion Supermarket, which was soon after replaced by an Ashbrook's, and Woolco. The mall notably lacked a department store. The mall was at risk of closing in the early 1990s due to competition from Birchwood Mall in Port Huron, though a combination of the Canadian government's decision to allow shopping on Sundays and the weakening of the Canadian dollar, which led to more Americans crossing the border, saved the mall from closure. During the 1990s, Lambton Mall underwent several expansions, including an acquisition of Woolco by Walmart, the opening of a Toys R Us in the east wing, and an expansion of the Canadian Tire into nearby stores.

The mall was owned by Orlando Corp between 2002 and 2005, when it was transferred to Lambton Mall Limited Partnership, a subsidiary of Primaris Retail. In 2006, Walmart closed down their mall location and built a new store in a strip mall just northeast. While the lease on the location does not end until 2021, it has been occupied by Canadian Tire, and a Galaxy Cinemas location was built in place of the old Canadian Tire Building in 2013. In 2013, the mall was purchased by KS Lambton Mall Inc., a subsidiary of Cushman and Wakefield. In March 2019, it was announced that the old Sears location had been approved for renovation, paving the way for new tenants to move in by April 2020. A Chuck's Roadhouse location replaced the Montana's Bar and Grill in June 2019, and in July of the same year it was announced that six stores, including a Northern Reflections and a Pet Valu, as well as two store locations occupied by the Ontario Provincial Police, would be vacated for a new clothing store which would occupy over 16,000 square feet.

=== December 14, 2000 roof collapse ===
In the early morning of December 14, 2000, at around 8:30 AM, part of the mall's roof collapsed under the weight of snow, which had been collecting for several days due to neglect to clear the roof of the building, near the Hallmark store. The collapse killed 47-year-old Susan Foster, a worker who had been preparing for opening, and injured one other worker. Coverage for the first few days was minimal, mainly on American news sites such as CNN and AP News. Canadian Broadcasting Corporation released an article on the 17th.

== Tenants ==
Major tenants of the mall include SportChek, Galaxy Cinemas, Canadian Tire, Dollarama, Toys R Us, Mark's, Hallmark, and New York Fries. The Beer Store, Chuck's Roadhouse, and Royal Bank of Canada also occupy major buildings on the lot which are disconnected from the mall. In 2020, A Marshalls/HomeSense store took over the former Sears Canada space.
