= Gabreïl Spiegelschrift =

- Born: April 30, 1973 (age 53); Fergus, Ontario
- Known for: Contemporary Dance Theatre and Dance Film
- Notable work: Young Man Intrigued by the Flight of the Non-Euclidean Fly, Tabulae Anatomicae Sex, five short movements, Grynde Haus, Tangó na dTuaitiní Uimh. 4,
- Website: THEVARS studios1.ca

Gabreïl Spiegelschrift (April 30, 1973) is a Canadian contemporary dance choreographer born in Fergus, Ontario.

== Career ==
Known for a "distinct and gutsy" raw brute force that combines archetypal historic and psychological themes together with diverse, often opposing dance techniques, Spiegelschrift's choreographic "punk rock ballet - just !@#$ the ballet part!" projects have often involved collaborations and performances with many musicians from diverse genres and styles including Rhea's Obsession, Malhavoc, cellist Elinor Frey, as well as Ashley MacIsaac & The Paperboys for the CBC duMaurier Concert Stage.

A collaboration with filmmaker Justin Stephenson in the early 1990s resulted in several experimental dance films such as "five short movements" (1993) and "Tabulae Anatomicae Sex" (1995).

Since 2004 Spiegelschrift's works have featured dancer Karen Rose (dancer).

=== 1989-1995 ===
Spiegelschrift moved to Toronto in 1989 for the dance program at Claude Watson School for the Arts at Earl Haig High School but dropped out 2 months later after attending the live presentation of Gerhard Bohner's revision (1977) of Oskar Schlemmer’s "Triadisches Ballett" (1922), ending his formal dance education. Initial choreographic works were often created for erotic dance performers and club kids presented alongside Toronto fashion designer Honey Garlic's Alternative Fashion Shows at RPM(The Government) and The Boom Boom Room before expanding to site specific and more traditional venue presentations. Often billed as the "Royal Bad Ass Ballet" Spiegelschrift created THEVARS as a working ensemble name for the dance theatre projects in 1991. Creations during this period include:

"Young Man Intrigued by the Flight of the Non-Euclidean Fly" (1992) inspired by the same titled Max Ernst painting this solo was premiered at the opening of the Acrobat - 1221 Bay Street, Toronto along with follow Canadian performers such as Jaymz Bee and Kiki Bonbon. The stylized fractured poses simulating Giorgio de Chirico figures contrasted with rapid fluid porte bras and multi-revolution turns and jumps would be used again in the short dance film "five short movements" (1993) collaboration with film maker Justin Stephenson. The dance film, still one of Spiegelschrift's favourite works, matched the choreography with Stephenson's multimedia editing and animation effects. The contrasting Butoh influenced solo "Icarus:landed"'(1993) was presented at Circle Ball Fair as a contrasting second part to "Young Man..." set to live accompaniment of cellist Hayley MacLean.

The elemental duets "Fire and Water - Duet #7" (1993) and "Luft und Erde - Duet #11" - Air and Earth (1994) developed and performed with Sonya Biernath and Nichole LaRochelle respectively were created as street performances for the Circle Ball Fair Street Festival Toronto. Both would be adapted for more traditional theatrical presentations such as the 8:08 Dance series (Toronto) and Dancing on the Edge (Vancouver). Fire and Water was filmed for Justin Stephenson's "Nearly home" (1994) and Luft und Erde in "Tabulae Anatomicae Sex" (1995) featuring the music of Rhea's Obsession.

The natural migration to experimental dance films and performances with musical groups allowed accessibility to non traditional dance presentation venues and broadcasts throughout Canada and Internationally.

=== 1996-2006 ===
Disenchanted after the collapse of several production developments due to funding and management issues, Spiegelschrift would withdraw from larger products to sporadically present intimate works. As a refreshing change he started teaching social dancing at Dancing on King before creating studios1.ca as a resource for his classes. During this period Spiegelschrift spent time in Ireland researching.

Highlights include the 1996 collaboration with Irish step dancer Michael Patrick Farrell to create and star in a contemporary/Irish step dance fusion work for the CBC Television duMaurier Concert Stage (Vancouver) performed with Ashley MacIsaac & the Paper Boys and the live performance of "Eat Me - Duet #14" (1996) with industrial metal band Malhavoc to their same titled track.

Produced by Leesa Berry, the "eccentric" Spiegelschrift choreographed a chronological tribute to burlesque dancing, "Grynde Haus" (1999) . Utilizing a mixture of contemporary dancers with erotic performers and the musical accompaniment of Tyler Yarema & His Rhythm the performance at The Opera House (Toronto) was hosted by Adrian and featured Miss Joa, the Dangerettes, Ottilie Mason, Nichole LaRochelle and DJ Aki.

"Tangó na dTuaitiní Uimh. 4" - The Bogmen's Tango #4 (2005) : for bickering couple and marching band was premiered with dancer Karen Rose at the River Run Centre in Guelph with the Guelph Concert Band. Set to Jan Van der Roost's Puszta: Four Gypsy Dances this vaudeville style commedia dell’arte goidelic piece is a memorial for Spiegelschrift's maternal grandmother.

=== 2007-present ===
Spiegelschrift focused more on teaching for several years. Started in 2005, the multiyear dance film process for "Caoineadh Phiersefine" - Persephone's Lament, an adaption of the solo created on Nichole LaRochelle for Antonia Thompson's "Earth, Wind and the Underground" (1993) has yet to be released despite production photos and clips on THEVARS website.

The collaboration with cellist Elinor Fry, "he misses her" (2007) was presented at the CAMMAC faculty concert at Lake Field College. The pair would again work together on "ricordo al futuro" (2009) inspired and set to Luciano Berio's Sequenza XIVa, set for premiere at EXcentris, last minute schedule changes remove the presentation from the program.

Spiegelschrift has relocated and now working and teaching out of Hamilton, Ontario.
