= Beethoven's sonatas =

Beethoven's sonatas may refer to:

- Beethoven's piano sonatas
- Beethoven's cello sonatas (disambiguation)
- Beethoven's violin sonatas (disambiguation)
