= Guelph Film Festival =

Annual Canadian film festival

The Guelph Film Festival is an annual Canadian film festival, staged in Guelph, Ontario. Launched in 1984, the festival programs an annual lineup of documentary films, focusing on themes such as social justice, the environment and community building.

Films are screened at a variety of venues throughout the city, including the University of Guelph, the Guelph Public Library, the Guelph Civic Museum, the Boarding House Gallery, the Macdonald Stewart Art Centre and various cafés and pubs in the downtown core.

== History ==
Originally founded as the Guelph International Film Festival in 1984, the festival was a joint collaboration between the Guelph International Research Centre (GIRC) and the University of Guelph’s Development Education Program. The festival ran for 7 years before its cancellation in 1991. The festival would be later revived in 2003 by GIRC after a 13-year hiatus

The event would go on to change its name multiple times, rebranding in 2008 to the Guelph Festival of Moving Media and the Guelph FIlm Festival in 2014. The festival became a non-profit organization in 2012.
