= Guelph General Hospital =

Hospital in Guelph, Ontario, Canada

Coordinates: 43.556223°N 80.253528°W

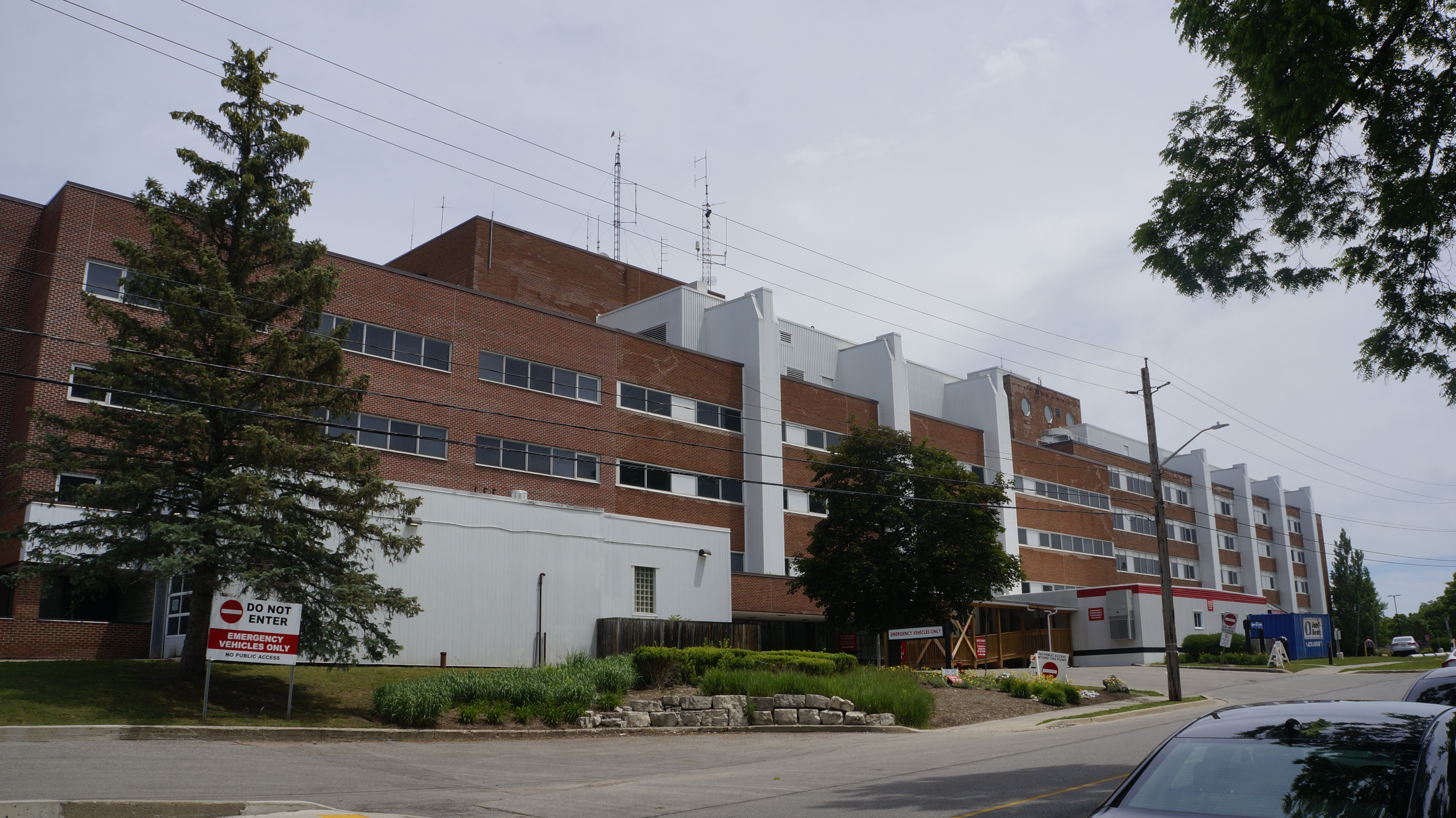
- Exterior of hospital

Geography
- Location: 115 Delhi Street; Guelph, Ontario, Canada

Organization
- Care system: Public Medicare (Canada)
- Type: Level III trauma centre

Services
- Beds: 165

History
- Founded: 1875

Links
- Website: http://www.gghorg.ca/
- Lists: Hospitals in Canada

Guelph General Hospital is a medical care facility in Guelph, Ontario, Canada. It is a 182-bed facility with a total staff of about 1600. The facility opened as a 12-bed unit on 16 August 1875.

This hospital rated as one of the safest in Canada in terms of the hospital standardized mortality ratio (the lower the better) at 78 in 2017, compared to the national average of 91. Also in 2017, the facility was among the best in Ontario in terms of wait times at the Emergency department.
