= Guelph =

City in Ontario, Canada

- City (single-tier)
- City of Guelph
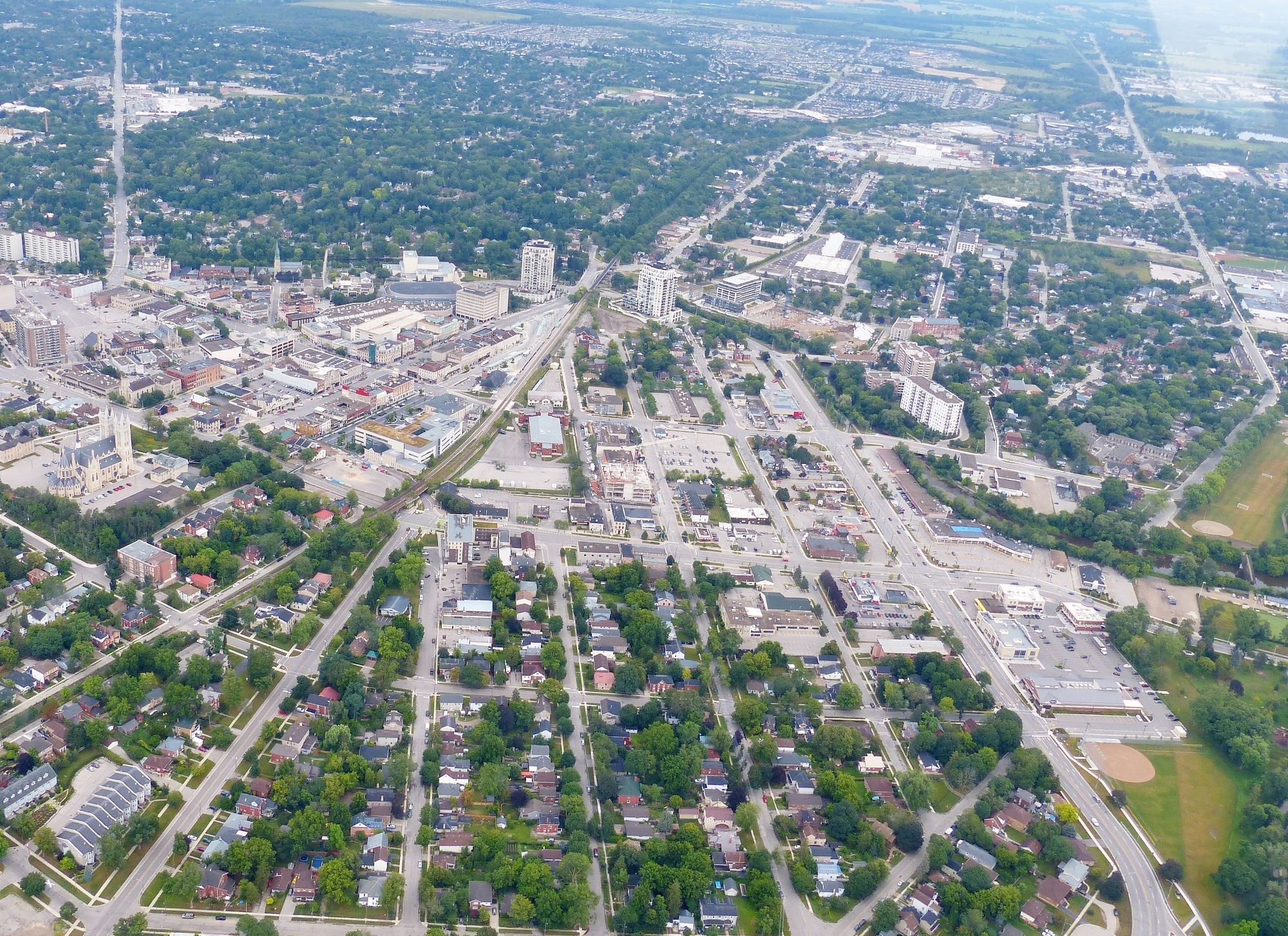
- Downtown Guelph

- Flag Coat of arms Logo
- Nicknames: "The Royal City"
- Motto(s): Faith, Fidelity and Progress
- Interactive map of Guelph
- Location within Southern Ontario Location within Wellington County
- Coordinates: 43°32′9″N 80°13′44″W
- Country: Canada
- Province: Ontario
- Founded: April 23, 1827
- Incorporated: April 23, 1879

Government
  - Mayor: Leanne Caron
  - Governing Body: Guelph City Council
  - MPs: Dominique O'Rourke (LPC); Michael Chong (CON)
  - MPPs: Mike Schreiner (GPO)

Area
  - Land: 87.22 km^{2} (33.68 sq mi)
  - Urban: 87.22 km^{2} (33.68 sq mi)
  - Metro: 593.51 km^{2} (229.16 sq mi)
- Elevation: 334 m (1,096 ft)

Population (2021)
  - City (single-tier): 143,740
  - Density: 1,644.1/km^{2} (4,258/sq mi)
  - Urban: 143,740
  - Urban density: 1,644.1/km^{2} (4,258/sq mi)
  - Metro: 165,588
  - Metro density: 278.3/km^{2} (721/sq mi)
- Demonym: Guelphite

Gross Metropolitan Product
  - Guelph CMA: CA$10.6 billion (2020)
- Time zone: UTC−05:00 (EST)
  - Summer (DST): UTC−04:00 (EDT)
- Forward sortation area: N1C to N1H, N1K to N1L
- Area codes: 519, 226 and 548
- Website: guelph.ca

Guelph (/ˈɡwɛlf/ GWELF; 2021 Canadian Census population 143,740) is a city in Southwestern Ontario, Canada. Known as "The Royal City", it is roughly 22 kilometres (14 mi) east of Kitchener and 70 kilometres (43 mi) west of Downtown Toronto, at the intersection of Highway 6, Highway 7, and Wellington County Road 124. It is the seat of Wellington County, but is politically independent of it.

Guelph was established in the 1820s by Scottish novelist John Galt, first superintendent of the Canada Company, who based his headquarters and home in the community. The area—much of which became Wellington County—was part of the Halton Block, a Crown reserve for the Six Nations Haudenosaunee. Galt is generally considered Guelph's founder.

For many years, Guelph ranked at or near the bottom of Canada's crime severity list. However, the 2017 index showed a 15% increase from 2016. It had one of the country's lowest unemployment rates throughout the Great Recession. Much of this was attributed to its numerous manufacturing facilities, including Linamar.

== History ==
=== Before European settlement ===
First Nations peoples inhabited present-day Guelph as early as 11,000 years ago. Before colonization, the area was considered by the surrounding Indigenous communities to be a "neutral" zone and was inhabited by the Neutral Nation. According to the University of Guelph, "the area was home to a First Nations community called the Attawandaron who lived in longhouses surrounded by fields of corn". The majority of this nation, about 4,000 people, lived in a village near what is now the Badenoch area of Puslinch, near Morriston. In 1784, the British Crown purchased a tract of land, that included present-day Guelph, from the Mississauga people for approximately £1,180.

=== Founding of Guelph ===
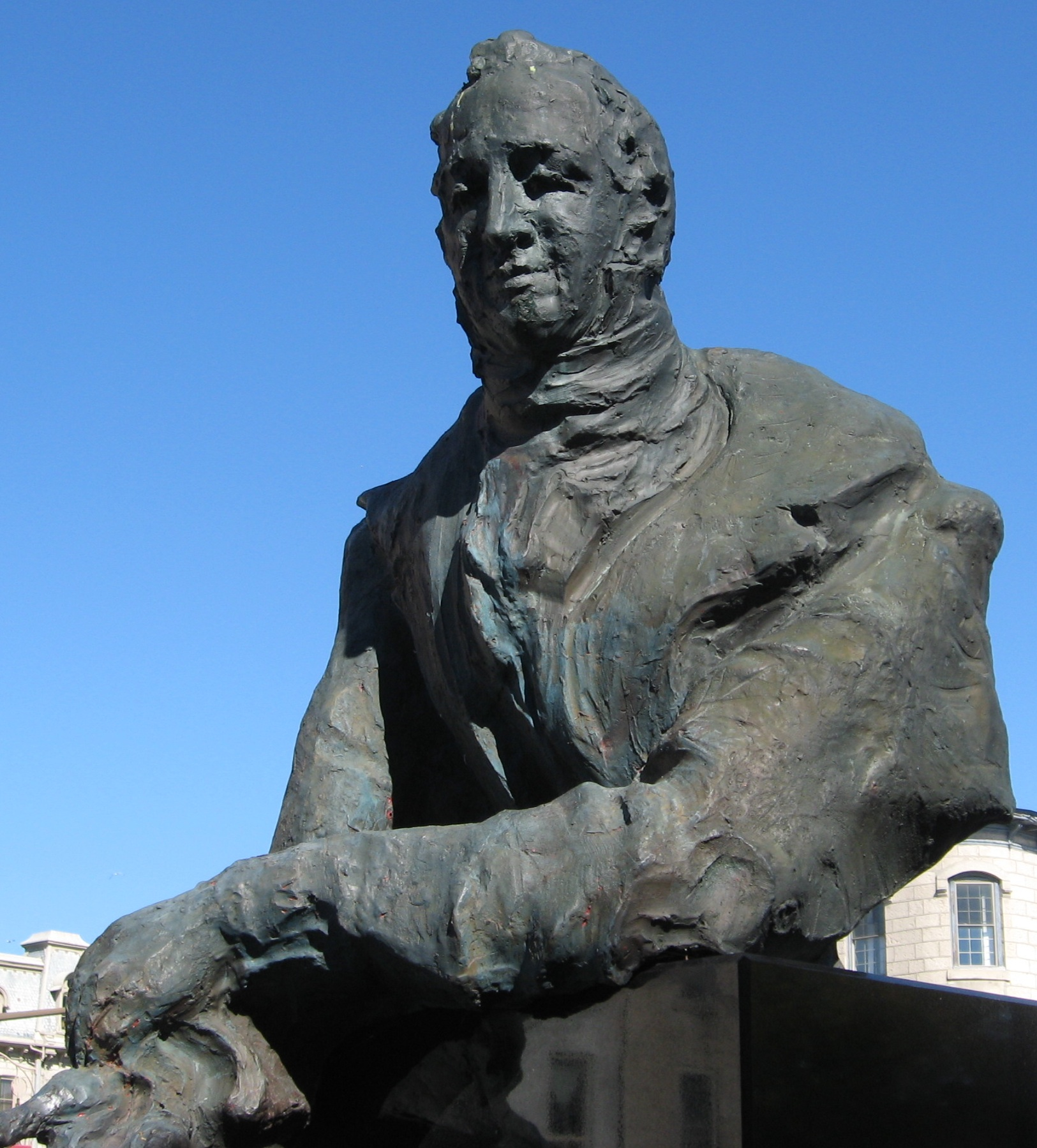
Bust of John Galt, downtown Guelph

John Galt, the first Superintendent of the Canada Company, was hired to help colonize Upper Canada. He selected Guelph as the headquarters of this British development firm. Galt was a popular Scottish poet and novelist who also designed the town to attract settlers and farmers to the surrounding countryside. His design intended the town to resemble a European city centre, complete with squares, broad main streets and narrow side streets, resulting in a variety of block sizes and shapes which are still in place today. The street plan was laid out in a radial street and grid system that branches out from downtown, a technique which was also employed in other planned towns of this era, such as Buffalo, New York.

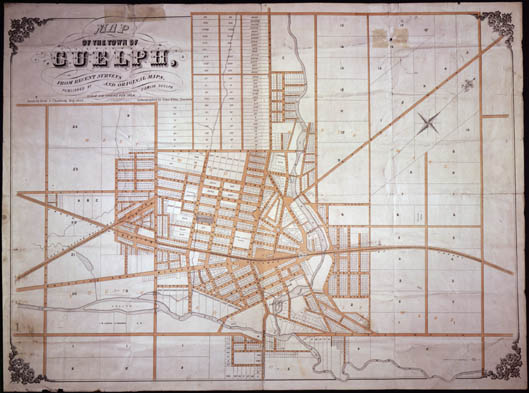
Map of Guelph, 1855

The founding was symbolized by the felling of a tree by Galt and William "Tiger" Dunlop, who would be significant in the history of Goderich, Ontario, on April 23, 1827. That was St. George's Day, the feast day of the patron saint of England.

The name Guelph comes, via the Italian Guelfo, from the Bavarian German Welf. It is a reference to the House of Welf, and was chosen to honour King George IV—the reigning British monarch at the time of the city's founding—whose family, the Hanoverians, descended from the Welfs. It is for this reason that the city has the nickname The Royal City. The directors of the Canada Company had actually wanted the city to be named Goderich, because Viscount Goderich had helped form the company, but reluctantly accepted the name Guelph.

Galt constructed what was one of the first buildings in the community to house early settlers and the Canada Company office; "The Priory" (built 1827–1828) was located on the banks of the Speed River near the current River Run Centre for performing arts and could house up to 100 people. The building eventually became the Canadian Pacific Railway Priory station on the Guelph Junction Railway before it was eventually torn down and removed. A historical plaque commemorates John Galt's role with the Canada Company in populating Upper Canada's Huron Tract, calling it "the most important single attempt at settlement in Canadian history". (Galt was responsible for finding settlers for the 42,000 acre Halton Block that would become Guelph and its townships but also for the one million acre Huron Tract that stretched to Goderich, Ontario.)

By the fall of 1827, 70 houses had been built, though some were primitive. In that year, the community had hired its first police constable; the first police station would be opened in 1856 at the town hall and it was moved in 1900 to the Annex building behind the court house. Also in 1827, the first Guelph Farmers' Market was built; the Market House was located in the downtown area. Founded in 1827, James Hodgert's brewery was managed by John Sleeman until he bought a property and opened the Silver Creek Brewery in 1851. (In 1843, there were nine breweries serving the 700 people living in Guelph.)

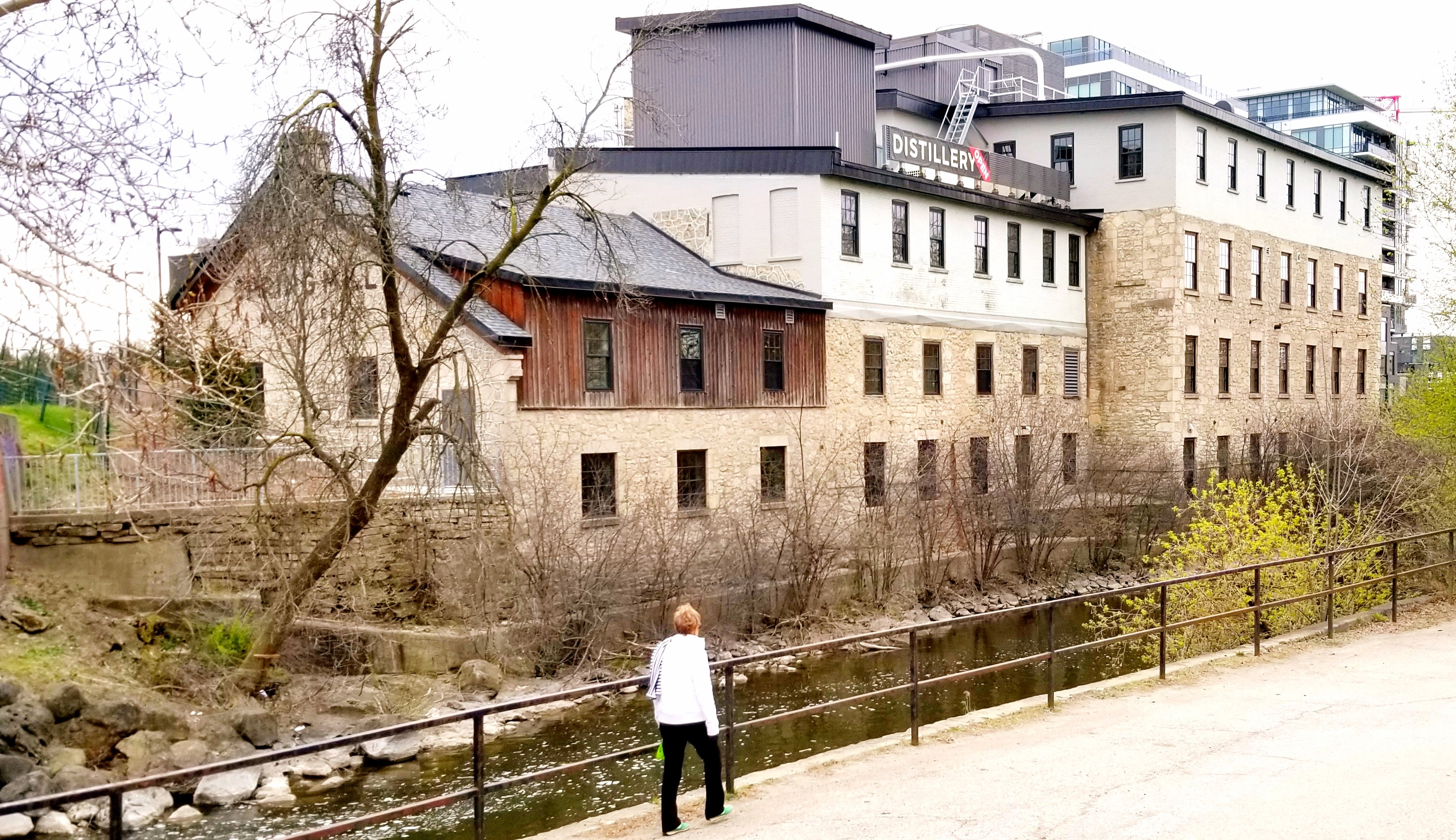
Part of Allan's Mill, built in 1850, still stands in downtown Guelph

The first Board of Commerce also started in 1827, to stimulate economic growth; in 1866, it would be renamed the Board of Trade, and in 1919, it became the Chamber of Commerce. In order to eliminate the need for farmers to take their grain to Galt or Dundas for grinding, the Canada Company built the first grist mill; the Guelph Mill was sold to William Allen in 1832. A sawmill was erected in 1833 by Charles Julius Mickle, originally from Scotland, on the Marden Creek which runs into the Speed River; its ruin survives today. The Mickle family also built a home nearby, a year earlier. Both properties were off what is now Highway 6, an area that was Guelph Township at the time.

In 1829, the Canada Company fired Galt because of poor bookkeeping and not obeying company policies. He returned to Great Britain penniless and was imprisoned because he was unable to pay his debts. In 1831, Guelph had approximately 800 residents. For several years, the economy of the village suffered and some residents moved away; relief came in the form of wealthy immigrants from England and Ireland who arrived in 1832.

The Smith's Canadian Gazetteer of 1846 indicates that the town had a jail and court house made of cut stone, a weekly newspaper, five churches/chapels and a population of 1,240; most were from England and Scotland with a few from Ireland. In addition to many tradesmen, the community had 15 stores, seven taverns, and some industry, tanneries, breweries, distilleries and a starch factory. The Post Office was receiving mail daily.

=== 1855 to 1878 ===
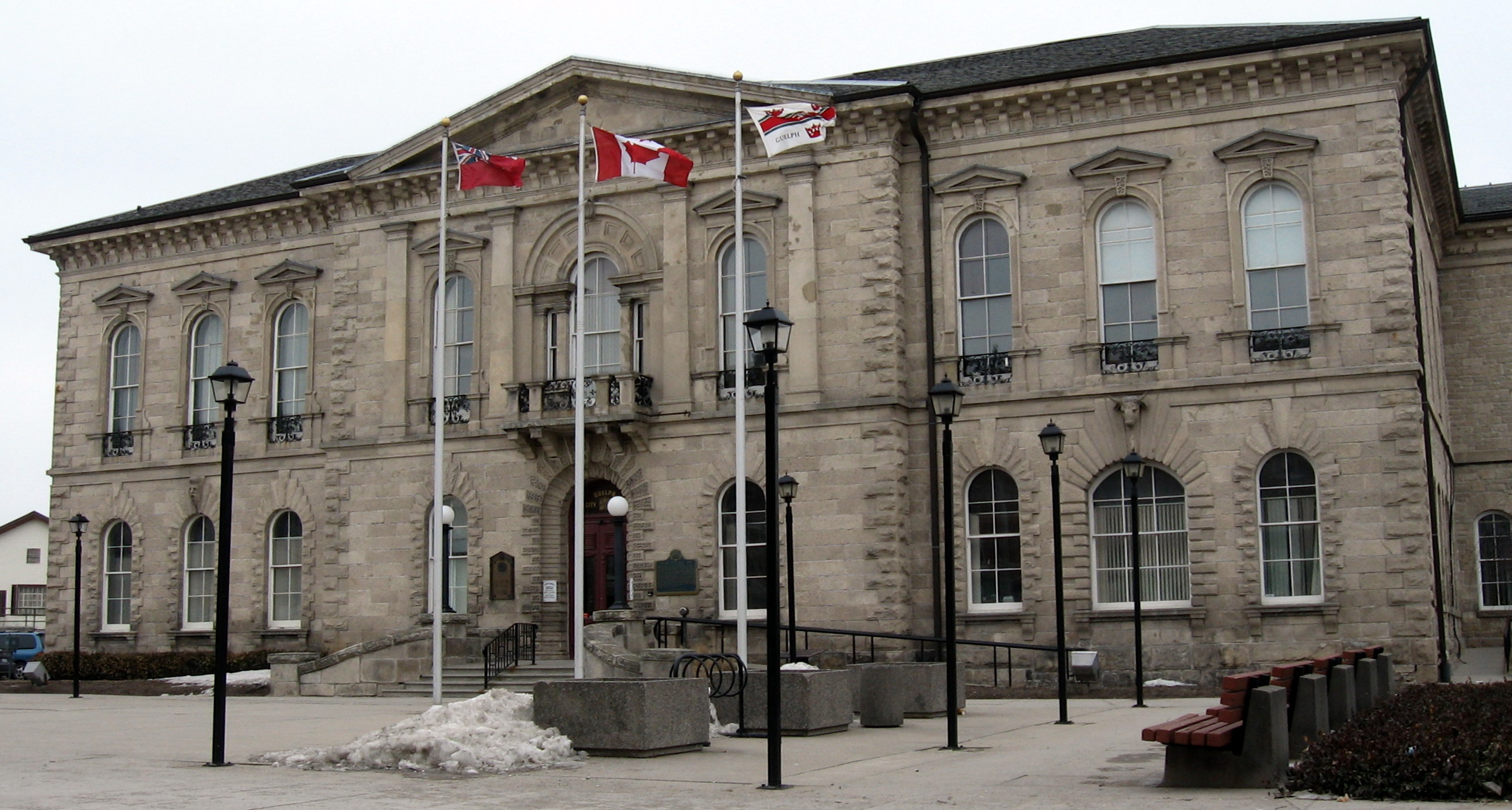
Old Guelph City Hall

Guelph was incorporated as a town in 1855 and the first mayor elected was John Smith. Despite optimism, the population growth was very slow until the Grand Trunk Railway reached it from Toronto, en route to Sarnia, in 1856; the town was also served soon thereafter by the Great Western Railway branch from Harrisburg. In 1856, the village became a town. Two years later, the population was estimated at 4,500, up from 2,000 in 1853. The first city hall, now called the Old City Hall (Guelph), was built in 1856 of Guelph stone; the building contained a market house, offices and an assembly hall. Modifications were made in 1870, 1875 and 1961. The new Guelph City Hall opened in 2009 beside the older building, which was declared a National Historic Site in 1984. The national document refers to the historic building as being "in the Italian Renaissance Revival style".

Two very successful major mills operated in Guelph for many years in the 1800s. The first was Allan's Mill, first established in 1830 on the Speed River and significantly expanded to include a distillery by the next owners, the Allan family, in the 1850s. This business was extensively damaged by fire in 1876 and ceased operation as a mill; the site was later used by manufacturing companies. (In 2019, the current John Sleeman reinstated the Spring Mill Distillery on the site which also includes a condominium apartment complex.)

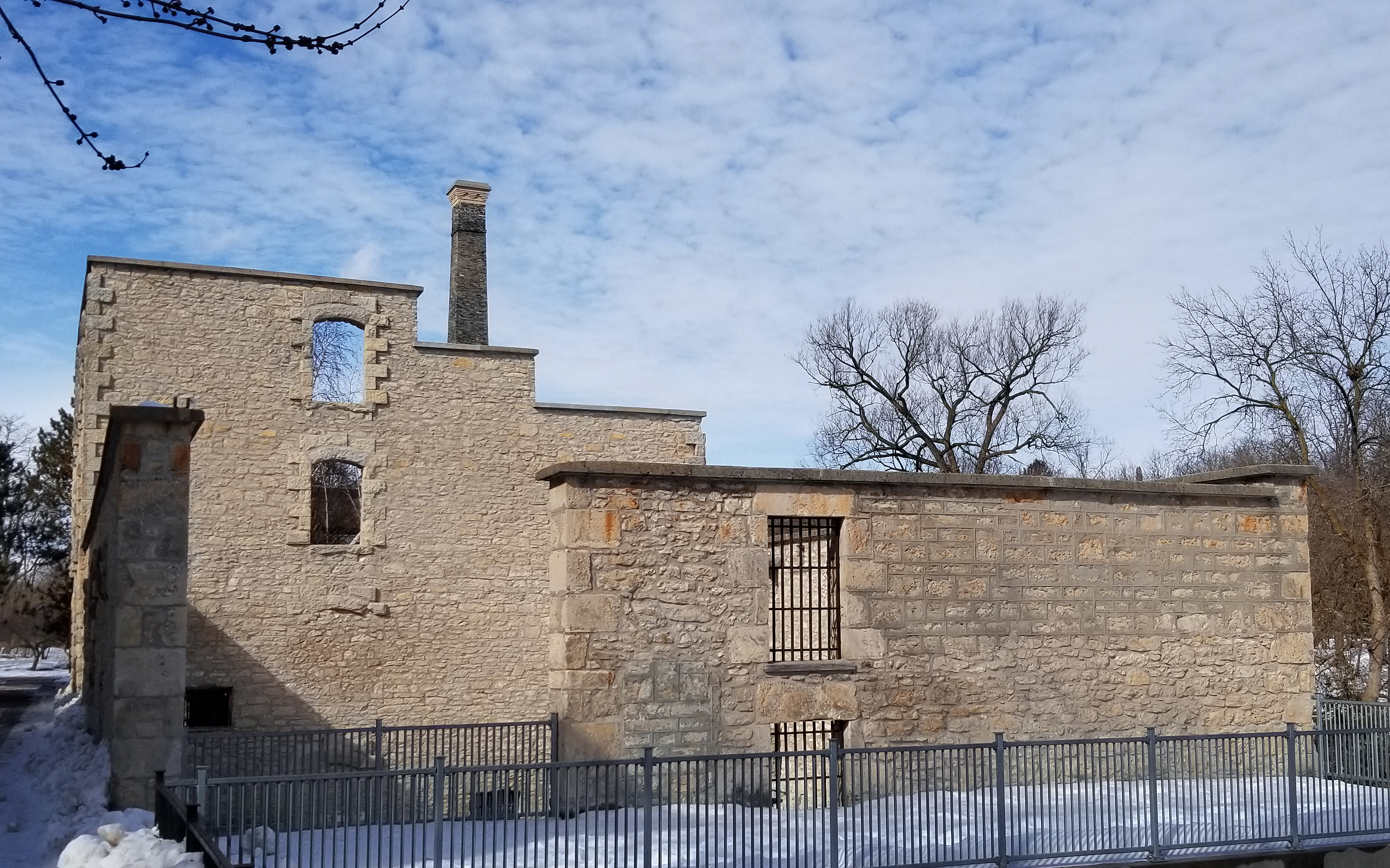
Goldie Mill ruins, stabilized in 2020-2021

The more recent business, a sawmill known as the Goldie Mill, was also on the Speed; this building was constructed in 1866 by James Goldie, replacing an earlier mill known as the Wellington Mill and later as the People's Mill. The property, a ruin, was listed on the Canadian Register as a historic place in 2009. Goldie was a perennial Conservative candidate for the riding of Wellington South, and his son Thomas Goldie was mayor of Guelph from 1891 to 1892. The limestone Goldie mill structure was damaged by fire in 1953 and a part of it was removed in 1969; the remaining part still stands today, in Goldie Mill Park at Cardigan Street and London Road East. The ruins, owned by the Grand River Conservation Authority, were stabilized in 2019–2021 to solve a problem created by sinkholes.

The board of the Guelph General Hospital was incorporated in 1861, with James Massie as the chairman. The building was completed in 1875, at the cost of $9,869, and opened on August 16, 1875, with 12 beds, a small infectious room and a dispensary.

The Gothic Revival style Roman Catholic church on Norfolk St., called the Basilica of Our Lady Immaculate since December 8, 2014, was built between 1876 and 1888.

By 1869, the community's manufacturing companies were served by both the Grand Trunk Railway and the Great Western Railway. The first section of the Wellington, Grey & Bruce Railway, between Guelph and Elora, opened in 1870; the line would eventually run as far as Southampton, Ontario, with stations in communities such as Palmerston, Harriston, Listowel and Wingham. The company was not very successful, and never did reach Owen Sound as planned, partly because of stiff competition from the Northern Railway of Canada as well as the Toronto, Grey and Bruce Railway. By the mid-1870s, the Wellington, Grey & Bruce Railway was in financial trouble; it eventually became part of the Grand Trunk system, and later, the Canadian National Railway.

By January 1871, some residents of the town had access to gas, provided by the Guelph Gas Company via pipes, initially to about 100 homes. Electricity would not become commonly available until the early 1900s, from the Guelph Light and Heat Commission.

An 1877 plan to start the Guelph Street Railway, using horse-drawn vehicles to deliver freight and passengers within Guelph, never came to fruition.

A poor house with a farm, The Wellington County House of Industry and Refuge, opened in December 1877 in a rural area near Guelph; many orphans from Guelph were admitted. The building still stands, as the Wellington County Museum and Archives.

=== After 1878 ===
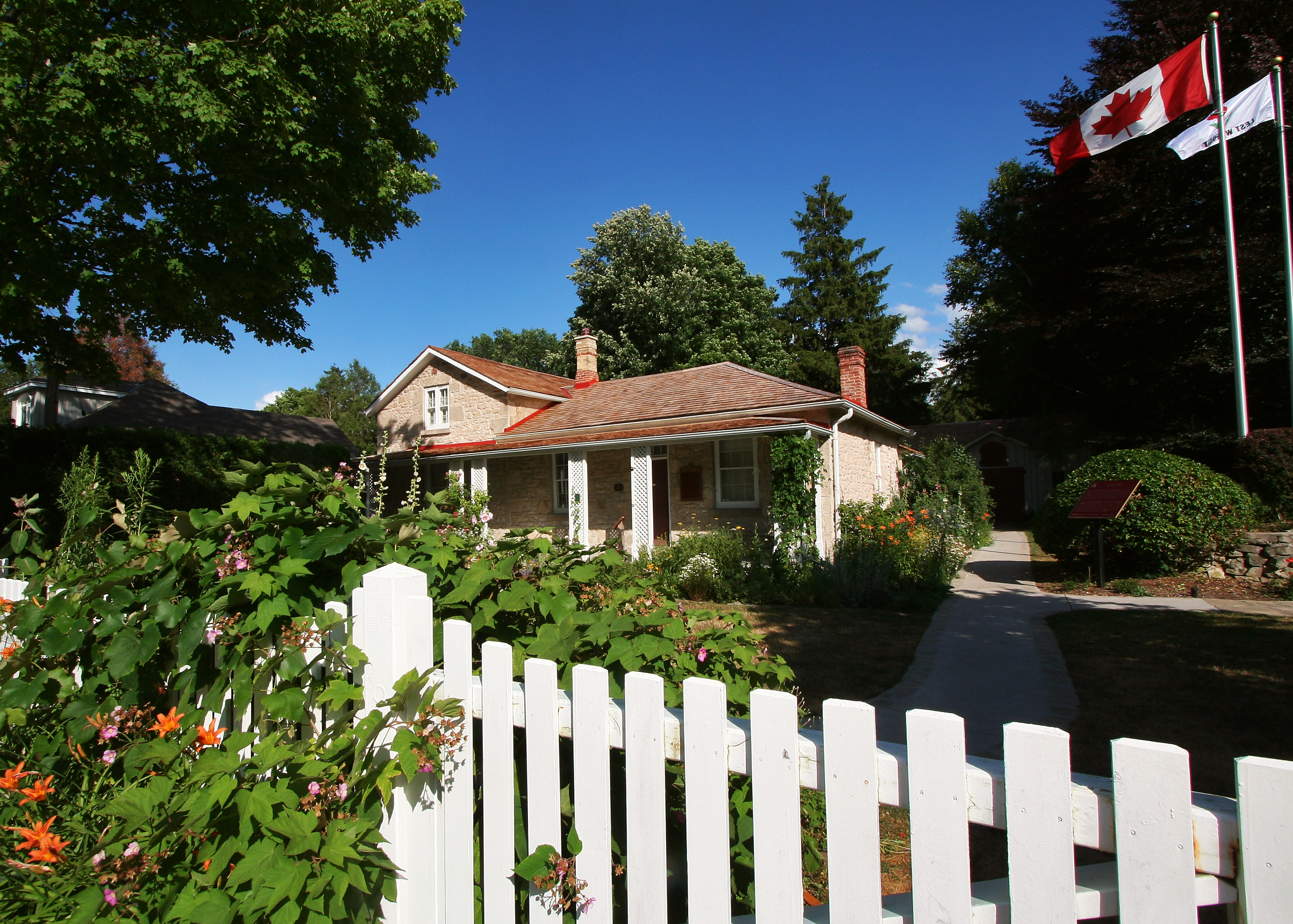
The birthplace of John McCrae (1872–1918) author of In Flanders Fields

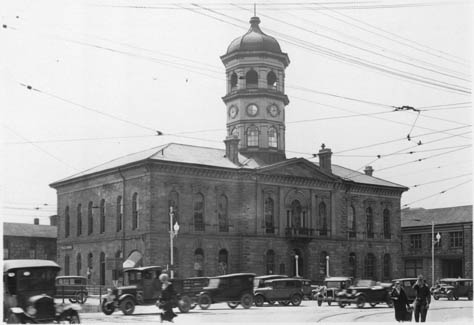
Guelph City Hall in 1920

Guelph was incorporated as a city in 1879 with a Special Act of the Ontario legislature. At this time, Guelph became politically separated from Wellington County and was no longer represented on the Wellington County Council. At separation, the population was about 10,000. During the inauguration, Mayor George Howard first used the term "Royal City". The only "royals" to actually visit were John Campbell, the Marquis of Lorne, and his wife, Princess Louise, Duchess of Argyll, one of Queen Victoria's daughters.

Construction of the Church of Our Lady Immaculate, known as the Basilica of Our Lady Immaculate since late 2014, was already underway but would not be completed until 1883. (The twin towers were not added until 1926.)

A few years later, George Sleeman Sr. founded an electric radial railway, the Guelph Railway Company, an important part of the history of Guelph Transit. Only five miles of track had been laid by 1895, but the line was extended in 1902; the radial railway eventually reached Toronto, as the Ontario Hydro Electric Railways - Guelph District (owned by Ontario Hydro). In addition to carrying passengers, the cars carted coal to heat the Ontario Agricultural College.

By 1886, telephones were quite common in the city. An April news article described the situation as follows. "Telephones are rapidly being introduced into private homes, where they prove a great convenience. Ladies order their groceries, consult their medical advisers, call their husbands home from the club and gossip with their friends by telephone."

In 1903 the City purchased the Guelph Light & Power Company, and four years later created the Board of Light and Heat Commissioners. Guelph was one of 13 municipalities that helped to create the provincial entity that became Ontario Hydro.

The Communist Party of Canada began as an illegal organization in a barn behind a farmhouse on Metcalfe Street in Guelph on 1921.

Guelph was the home of North America's first cable TV system. Fredrick T. Metcalf created MacLean Hunter Television (now part of Rogers Communications) and their first broadcast was Queen Elizabeth's Coronation in 1953. Other news-making items include the fact that the jockstrap was invented here, in 1922, by the Guelph Elastic Hosiery Company and that the man who invented five pin bowling in 1909, Tom Ryan, was originally from Guelph. Other noteworthy items: the city's covered bridge (now part of a walking trail), built by the Timber Framers' Guild in 1992, is one of only two of its type in Ontario, using wooden pins to hold it together. Note too that the Yukon Gold potato was first bred at the University of Guelph in 1966; it became available on the market in 1981.

Guelph's police force had Canada's first municipal motorcycle patrol. Chief Ted Lamb brought back an army motorcycle he used during the First World War. Motorcycles were faster and more efficient than walking.

Guelph has several buildings on the National Historic Sites of Canada register: the Basilica of Our Lady Immaculate, McCrae House and Old City Hall. The city is home to the University of Guelph, established in 1964, and Sleeman Breweries Ltd. The Ontario Agricultural College (OAC), the oldest part of the University of Guelph, began in 1874 as an associate agricultural college of the University of Toronto. According to Maclean's, the current University of Guelph, founded in 1964, "grew out of three founding colleges: the Ontario Agricultural College (1874), the Ontario Veterinary College (1862) and the Macdonald Institute (1903)". Guelph Collegiate Vocational Institute (GCVI), established in the 1840s, is one of the province's oldest high schools. The Former Canadian National Railways (VIA Rail/GO Transit) Station at 79 Carden Street was listed in 1992.

In 2017, Scientology Canada announced it would move its Canadian headquarters to Guelph. Some residents protested the plan. The facility was opened in the autumn of the year at 40 Baker Street.

A redevelopment plan for Downtown Guelph had been discussed by Council since 2007 and was finalized as the 2018 Baker District redevelopment project. The intent is to transform the Baker St. parking lot and properties fronting Wyndham Street's north end into a mixed-use development, with urban intensification. Both residential and commercial buildings will be included. The final cost was estimated at between $315 million and $369 million. When finished, this area will include a new library, commercial, institutional and office space as well as an underground parking lot. The private enterprise partner for the project is Ottawa-based Windmill Development Group; there was also discussion about an additional partnership with Conestoga College and the YMCA. Actual construction was not expected to start until 2023. Before that date, up to $7.5 million will be spent to acquire the rest of the land that will be required.

In October 2018, the Ontario Energy Board approved the merger of Guelph Hydro and Alectra Utilities Corporation. After the merger was completed in January 2019, the city received a 4.63 per cent stake in Alectra and a one-time dividend of $18.5 million; afterwards, annual dividends would be received. The city has one permanent seat on the company's Board.

== Geography ==
=== Topography and water courses ===
Downtown Guelph is situated above the confluence of the Speed River and the Eramosa River, which have numerous tributaries. The Speed River enters from the north and the Eramosa River from the east; the two rivers meet below downtown and continue southwest, where they merge with the Grand River. There are also many creeks and smaller rivers creating large tracts of densely forested ravines, and providing ideal sites for parks and recreational trails. The city is built on several drumlins and buried waterways, the most notable being an underground creek flowing below the Albion Hotel, once the source of water used to brew beer. Guelph is the largest Canadian city to rely almost entirely on groundwater for its drinking supply, which is sourced from two main aquifers.

=== Climate ===
This region of Ontario has cold winters and warm, humid summers, falling into the Köppen climate classification Dfb zone (humid continental), with moderately high rainfall and snowfall. It is generally a couple of degrees cooler than lower elevation regions on the Great Lakes shorelines, especially so in winter, the exception being on some spring afternoons when the lack of an onshore breeze boosts temperatures well above those found lakeside.

The highest temperature ever recorded in Guelph was 38.3 °C (100.9 °F) on August 6, 1918, and July 13, 1936. The coldest temperature ever recorded was −37.2 °C (−35.0 °F) on January 25, 1884.

Climate data for University of Guelph Arboretum (1991−2020 normals, extremes 1881−present)
Month	Jan	Feb	Mar	Apr	May	Jun	Jul	Aug	Sep	Oct	Nov	Dec	Year
Record high °C (°F)	16.7 (62.1)	15.5 (59.9)	26.4 (79.5)	29.2 (84.6)	32.2 (90.0)	36.2 (97.2)	38.3 (100.9)	38.3 (100.9)	36.7 (98.1)	29.4 (84.9)	23.9 (75.0)	19.1 (66.4)	38.3 (100.9)
Mean daily maximum °C (°F)	−2.8 (27.0)	−1.7 (28.9)	3.5 (38.3)	10.8 (51.4)	18.6 (65.5)	23.4 (74.1)	25.8 (78.4)	25.0 (77.0)	20.8 (69.4)	13.6 (56.5)	6.6 (43.9)	0.5 (32.9)	12.0 (53.6)
Daily mean °C (°F)	−6.8 (19.8)	−6.2 (20.8)	−1.3 (29.7)	5.2 (41.4)	12.3 (54.1)	17.1 (62.8)	19.5 (67.1)	18.7 (65.7)	14.5 (58.1)	8.4 (47.1)	2.5 (36.5)	−3 (27)	6.7 (44.1)
Mean daily minimum °C (°F)	−10.8 (12.6)	−10.7 (12.7)	−6.1 (21.0)	−0.4 (31.3)	5.9 (42.6)	10.8 (51.4)	13.2 (55.8)	12.4 (54.3)	8.2 (46.8)	3.2 (37.8)	−1.6 (29.1)	−6.4 (20.5)	1.5 (34.7)
Record low °C (°F)	−37.2 (−35.0)	−32.8 (−27.0)	−28.9 (−20.0)	−16.7 (1.9)	−7.8 (18.0)	−1.7 (28.9)	1.7 (35.1)	−1.1 (30.0)	−5.6 (21.9)	−12.8 (9.0)	−20.6 (−5.1)	−31.1 (−24.0)	−37.2 (−35.0)
Average precipitation mm (inches)	51.9 (2.04)	58.0 (2.28)	66.9 (2.63)	73.7 (2.90)	79.7 (3.14)	78.8 (3.10)	95.8 (3.77)	92.8 (3.65)	90.4 (3.56)	71.6 (2.82)	91.2 (3.59)	80.5 (3.17)	931.3 (36.67)
Average rainfall mm (inches)	17.6 (0.69)	24.1 (0.95)	43.8 (1.72)	69.9 (2.75)	79.6 (3.13)	78.8 (3.10)	95.8 (3.77)	92.8 (3.65)	90.4 (3.56)	70.1 (2.76)	81.2 (3.20)	38.1 (1.50)	782.0 (30.79)
Average snowfall cm (inches)	38.6 (15.2)	37.2 (14.6)	26.4 (10.4)	3.8 (1.5)	0.07 (0.03)	0.0 (0.0)	0.0 (0.0)	0.0 (0.0)	0.0 (0.0)	1.5 (0.6)	9.0 (3.5)	38.6 (15.2)	155.1 (61.1)
Average precipitation days (≥ 0.2 mm)	16.2	12.8	12.7	13.7	13.3	11.8	11.7	13.5	14.1	14.6	16.0	16.8	167.0
Average rainy days (≥ 0.2 mm)	4.0	3.9	7.9	12.3	13.3	11.8	11.7	13.5	14.1	14.5	13.4	6.9	127.4
Average snowy days (≥ 0.2 cm)	12.7	9.6	5.9	1.6	0.07	0.0	0.0	0.0	0.0	0.43	3.4	11.0	44.7
Mean monthly sunshine hours	80.4	96.7	146.3	172.5	230.7	256.5	277.9	236.7	172.2	140.6	82.1	55.4	1,947.9
Percentage possible sunshine	27.8	32.8	39.7	42.9	50.6	55.7	59.5	54.7	45.8	41.0	28.1	19.8	41.5
Source 1: Canada Weather Stats
Source 2: Environment Canada (precipitation/rain/snow/sun 1981–2010)

== Economy ==
The city of Guelph's diversified economy helped Guelph obtain the country's lowest unemployment rate at 4.2 per cent in 2011 and at 3.9 per cent in February 2016. The great diversity in the types of employers is a significant factor too; the city is not dependent on a single industry. The workforce participation rate of 72% was the best in Canada in December 2015 according to BMO senior economist Robert Kavcic. The job growth of more than 9 per cent at the same time was also of great value to the community. At the time, the BMO economist also rated Guelph as the top city in Canada for those looking for work. Over subsequent months, the rate increased steadily and the jobless rate was at a more typical 5.9% by October 2017, compared to 5.1% in Kitchener-Waterloo. The rate in June 2018 had decreased to 4.5%. By December 2018, StatsCan was indicating an unemployment rate of only 2.3%, down from 4% in November, and the lowest in Canada at that time.

The overall economy of the Guelph "region" (including the city and the townships of Guelph/Eramosa and Puslinch, Ontario) grew at an average of 3.5% per year over the previous five years and was expected to be 2.1% in 2019 and also in 2020 according to the Conference Board of Canada's August 2019 report. Guelph's real gross domestic product (GDP) grew by 3.6% per cent in 2018, the highest among medium-sized cities in Canada. "Although economic growth is poised to moderate in 2019, Guelph will maintain its place as one of Canada’s economic growth leaders," the report predicted.

=== Manufacturing and education sectors ===
Manufacturing is the leading sector of the economy of the city with the most significant sector being auto parts manufacturing. The Conference Board of Canada's August 2019 report stated that the Guelph region's manufacturing was experiencing significant growth, averaging 5.9% over the past five years and expected to be 4.2% in 2019.

Linamar is the city's leader in this sector, with 22 manufacturing plants. The company has received government funding for expansion that would create additional jobs, most recently in 2015 ($101 million) and in 2018 ($99 million). The latter would create 1,500 additional jobs and maintain 8,000 others in the Canadian operation.

According to research completed by the City of Guelph in 2010, fabricated metal product manufacturing accounted for 26.1% of the types of industries, followed by machinery manufacturing for 12.8% and miscellaneous manufacturing for 10.4%. The city's Economic Development Strategy identified life science, agri-food and biotechnology firms, environmental management and technology companies as growth industries on which to focus economic development activities.

The city also touts the importance of advanced manufacturing which is its largest employer. The roughly 360 businesses of this type employ approximately 14,755 people (roughly 25% of Guelph's labour force). The category includes "high precision manufacturing and auto parts assembly to plastic injection moulding machines manufacturing and automation devices. This enables advanced manufacturing to be a strong driver of the local economy."

The second largest industry is Educational services, accounting for 11.3% of growth.

=== Other sectors ===
Guelph is very attractive to the agri-food and biotechnology market sector, according to the city. It was ranked as the top cluster in Ontario and one of the top two in Canada. This sector includes over 90 companies in Guelph-Wellington, employing approximately 6,500 people.

The City encourages movie and television filming. Parts of several productions have been filmed here, including Agnes of God (1985), American Gods (released in 2017), 11.22.63 (2016) with James Franco, Total Recall (2012), Dream House (2011), The Heretics (2017), Dead Rush (2016) and episodes of Murdoch Mysteries (2013 and 2015).

=== Guelph Innovation District ===
As part of the plan to increase development, City Council voted in late 2017 to buy 98 hectares (240 acres) south of York Road owned by the Provincial government, including part of the property of the former Wellington Detention Centre. After the acquisition, the city would seek one or more developers to buy the property. The land actually purchased was only 23% of the long-term plan for development in the entire site bounded by Watson Parkway South, the south border of the city and Victoria Road South.

The city decided in late 2018 not to purchase the additional land for economic reasons. In 2019, the remaining 362 acres of Ontario government land was listed for sale by the province.

=== Employment data ===
According to the Bank of Montreal's fourth quarter 2018 report, Guelph was the leading city in Canada in terms of job growth and low unemployment. In January 2019, the city had the lowest unemployment rate in Canada.

The 2016 Census indicated a labour force of nearly 76,000, of which about 55% said they worked full-time all year. At the time the data was gathered, 4,610 persons indicated they were unemployed. The top five occupations in terms of the number so employed were Sales and service (16,195), Education, law and social, community and government services (10,205), Business, finance and administration (10,150), Trades, transport and equipment operators and related occupations (9,170) and manufacturing and utilities (8,205).

The City of Guelph's published 2016 data was sorting occupations in a different manner. In that report, Professional, Scientific and Technical jobs employed 39,141, Advanced Manufacturing employed 20,735, Retail and Service employed 11,345, Agri-Innovation employed 11,345, Culture and entertainment employed 7,711 and that Distribution, warehousing and wholesale employed 5,909.

The largest private enterprise employers in Guelph (2016) included:

- Linamar Corporation
- Cargill Meat Solutions
- Polycon Industries
- The Co-operators
- Guelph Manufacturing Group Inc.
- Blount Canada Ltd.

The Cooperators was one of the Platinum Winners in Canada's Best Employers 2017 report; the company has been on this list for 14 years.

The largest public sector employers (2016) included:

- Upper Grand District School Board
- University of Guelph
- City of Guelph
- Wellington Catholic District School Board
- Guelph General Hospital
- Homewood Health Centre

The university's staffing fell into three categories in 2015: there were 2,600 regular full-time faculty and staff, 1,890 temporary (full-time and part-time) and 3,690 student employees. The university was among Canada's Best Employers in 2016 according to Forbes magazine, making the top 20 in the list.

Two Guelph companies were among the 2018 winners of the Waterloo Area's Top Employers competition. According to the report, Reid's Heritage Group of Companies, a home builder with 212 full-time employees, "supports employees who are new mothers with maternity leave top-up payments .... [provides] flexible work hours, helps employees balance work and their personal commitments with up to 10 paid personal days ... and offers referral bonuses [for staff hires]." Sleeman Breweries Limited, with 991 full-timers, offers "generous tuition subsidies ... opportunities for the next generation to gain meaningful experience through summer employment and co-op placements ... retirement planning assistance and phased-in work options" as well as bonuses for salaried staff and profit-sharing for those who are unionized.

== Demographics ==
Historical populations
Year	Pop.	±%
1841	1,240	—
1851	1,860	+50.0%
1871	6,878	+269.8%
1881	9,890	+43.8%
1891	10,537	+6.5%
1901	11,496	+9.1%
1911	15,175	+32.0%
1921	18,128	+19.5%
1931	21,075	+16.3%
1941	23,074	+9.5%
1951	27,386	+18.7%
1961	39,838	+45.5%
1971	60,087	+50.8%
1981	71,207	+18.5%
1991	87,976	+23.5%
1996	95,821	+8.9%
2001	106,170	+10.8%
2006	114,943	+8.3%
2011	121,688	+5.9%
2016	131,794	+8.3%
2021	143,740	+9.1%

In the 2021 Census of Population conducted by Statistics Canada, Guelph had a population of 143,740 living in 56,480 of its 59,746 total private dwellings, a change of 9.1% from its 2016 population of 131,794. With a land area of 87.43 square kilometres (33.76 sq mi), it had a population density of 1,644.1/km^{2} (4,258.1/sq mi) in 2021.

At the census metropolitan area (CMA) level in the 2021 census, the Guelph CMA had a population of 165,588 living in 64,175 of its 67,685 total private dwellings, a change of 9% from its 2016 population of 151,984. With a land area of 595.08 square kilometres (229.76 sq mi), it had a population density of 278.3/km^{2} (720.7/sq mi) in 2021.

Guelph was the third fastest-growing city in Ontario, with a 5-year growth of 8.3% from 2011 to 2016. According to the Ontario Places to Grow plan, Guelph's population is projected to be about 144,500 by the year 2021 and 175,000 by 2031. The actual number of residents varies throughout the year because of variations in the University of Guelph student population.

=== Ethnicity ===
Approximately 73.1% of residents were European Canadians in 2021, whereas 25.3% were visible minorities and 1.6% were Indigenous. The largest visible minority groups in Guelph were South Asian (7.4%), Black (4.2%), Chinese (3.0%), Filipino (2.7%), Southeast Asian (2.2%), Latin American (1.4%), West Asian (1.4%) and Arab (1.2%).

The 2021 Census indicated that 12,210 Italian Canadians lived in Guelph. Many Italians from the south of Italy, particularly from San Giorgio Morgeto, had immigrated to the area in the early 1900s, and also in later years. Historically, however, Guelph's population has been principally British in origin, with 92% in 1880 and 87% in 1921.

Largest ethnic origin in Guelph CMA by census tracts based on the 2021 census

Panethnic groups in the City of Guelph (2001−2021)
Panethnic group	2021		2016		2011		2006		2001	
Panethnic group	Pop.	%	Pop.	%	Pop.	%	Pop.	%	Pop.	%
European (Note: Statistic includes all persons that did not make up part of a visible minority or an indigenous identity.)	103,675	73.1%	103,725	79.74%	99,680	82.69%	97,025	85.02%	91,790	87.67%
South Asian	10,480	7.39%	6,500	5%	4,970	4.12%	3,820	3.35%	2,745	2.62%
Southeast Asian (Note: Statistic includes total responses of "Filipino" and "Southeast Asian" under visible minority section on census.)	6,995	4.93%	5,285	4.06%	4,850	4.02%	3,545	3.11%	2,505	2.39%
African	5,940	4.19%	2,885	2.22%	1,695	1.41%	1,565	1.37%	1,380	1.32%
East Asian (Note: Statistic includes total responses of "Chinese", "Korean", and "Japanese" under visible minority section on census.)	4,860	3.43%	4,710	3.62%	3,775	3.13%	3,415	2.99%	3,190	3.05%
Middle Eastern (Note: Statistic includes total responses of "West Asian" and "Arab" under visible minority section on census.)	3,620	2.55%	2,290	1.76%	1,615	1.34%	1,560	1.37%	945	0.9%
Indigenous	2,220	1.57%	1,905	1.46%	1,950	1.62%	1,290	1.13%	760	0.73%
Latin American	2,015	1.42%	1,345	1.03%	1,150	0.95%	1,030	0.9%	745	0.71%
Other (Note: Statistic includes total responses of "Visible minority, n.i.e." and "Multiple visible minorities" under visible minority section on census.)	2,045	1.44%	1,440	1.11%	860	0.71%	860	0.75%	640	0.61%
Total responses	141,835	98.67%	130,085	98.7%	120,550	99.06%	114,115	99.28%	104,705	98.62%
Total population	143,740	100%	131,794	100%	121,688	100%	114,943	100%	106,170	100%

- Note: Totals greater than 100% due to multiple origin responses.

=== Language ===
The most common mother tongue in 2021 was English; spoken by 74.5% of the population, followed by Chinese languages (2.3%), Punjabi (1.5%), Italian (1.3%), Vietnamese (1.2%), Tagalog (1.2%), Spanish (1.2%), and French (1.1%). 2.7% of residents claimed both English and a non-official language as their first language.

=== Religion ===
Largest non-Christian religion in Guelph CMA by census tract based on the 2021 census

In 2021, 49.7% of Guelph residents were Christians, down from 61.8% in 2011. 23.9% of residents were Catholics, 13.7% were Protestants, 7.3% were Christians of unspecified denomination, and 2.0% were Christian Orthodox. All other denominations of Christianity and Christian-related traditions accounted for 2.8%. 38.7% of the population stated no religion, up from 30.3% in 2011. All other religions and spiritual traditions combined accounted for 13.6% of the population. The largest non-Christian religions were Islam (4.5%), Hinduism (2.7%), Sikhism (1.5%) and Buddhism (1.5%)

== Crime ==
The national average for the crime severity index was 70.96 per 100,000 people in 2016 while Guelph's was much lower at 55 per 100,000 people according to a study published by Maclean's. In this report, Guelph was at about the middle of the statistics, with the worst community, North Battleford, Saskatchewan, at 353 per 100,000 people and nearby Kitchener-Waterloo at 61. More specific data was also provided:

- Violent crime severity index: 49 per 100,000 people compared to 75.25 for the national index.
- Homicide rate: The city had only one homicide in 2016 for a rate of 0.76 per 100,000 people, compared to the national average of 1.68.
- Assault rate: Guelph was at 181.87 versus the national average of 370
- Sexual assault rate: This aspect was quite high with 64.22 per 100,000 people compared to the national rate of 56.6.
- Robbery rate: Guelph had 21.91 per 100,000 people, much lower than the national average of 60.9.
- Fraud: This aspect has increased notably since 1996; it was at 260.67 per 100,000 people in 2016, versus the national rate of 299.05.
- Drug offences: The city is well below the national average in all categories.
- Youth Criminal Justice Act offences: The rate was 8.31 per 100,000 in Guelph, substantially lower than the national average of 16.74.

The 2017 Index showed a 15% increase to 64 per 100,000 people, still well below the national index. Much of the increase was in property crime and sexual assaults. Reporting of the latter type of crimes was up by up 42.7%. This may not indicate the actual increase in the number of sexual assault incidents, as theorized by Chief of Police Jeff DeRuyter. He told a reporter that "We are seeing an increase in sexual assault reporting, and that’s a positive, because we’ve always believed the reporting of sexual assault was under-reported."

As of January 2019, the Chief of Police is former RCMP inspector Gordon Cobey, who replaced Jeff DeRuyter who retired after 35 years of service with the Guelph Police Service. DeRuyter had been Chief since 2015, when he replaced Bryan Larkin who went on to head the Waterloo Regional Police Service.

=== Facilities for incarceration ===
The Wellington County Jail (in Late Gothic Revival Style) and the Governor's Residence (in Georgian style) at 74 Woolwich Street were built in 1911; they were designated by the city for "historic and architectural value" and as a National Historic Site in 1983. The property is now an Ontario Court of Justice.

Guelph was home to a major correctional institution from 1911 until 2001, originally the Ontario Reformatory with subsequent names including Wellington Detention Centre and, after 1972, Guelph Correctional Centre. The first inmates had been transferred to the Guelph reformatory from Toronto's Central Prison when it closed in 1915. By 1910, however, a prison farm beside the Eramosa River had begun receiving prisoners. The farm inmates constructed a concrete bridge, a spur line to the CPR and a wooden trestle bridge. The official opening of the farm was September 25, 1911. By 1912, the various buildings on the site housed 300; the correctional operations on the site were fully operational by 1914. Between 1911 and 1915, prisoners had built the Administration building, the cell blocks, ponds and waterways, dry stone walls, stairs, gates, bridges and terraced gardens. By 1916, this was the largest correctional facility in Ontario, housing 660.

During World War I, the property served as the Guelph Military Convalescent Hospital a convalescent hospital for over 900 veterans, from 1917. The prisoners returned in January 1921.

The farm and Reformatory were used to teach inmates useful skills, including agriculture, dry cleaning, metalworking, and other trades. By the late 1940s the facility produced food for all of Ontario's prisons, and also made blankets, wood and metal products; there was a stone quarry stone on site. By 1962 the prison farm accommodated a dairy, piggery, horses, cattle and vegetable farming. The farm area eventually included barns, a woolen mill, abattoir, tailor shop, laundry, bakery, metal shop, broom shop and other facilities. The prison abattoir was eventually sold off and became the privately owned company, later known as Better Beef (purchased by Cargill Canada in 2005), a massive meat processing plant.

In 2001, the Ministry of Correctional Services closed the entire facility; the remaining inmates were transferred to larger jails. Afterwards, the property was used for some film shoots and for training emergency personnel. In December 2017, City Council voted to buy 98 hectares (240 acres) for subsequent sale to developers, including the area that was then the Turf Grass research building and the jail farm, the so-called York District Land. The actual penal buildings and the land around them were not included in the plan.

In June 2019, 328.6 acres of the land, including 100 acres of natural area, still owned by the province, went on sale. The City of Guelph had not bought the site for the planned Guelph Innovation District, as it had initially considered doing, because of the potential financial risk. A rough estimate in 2017 by the city had suggested that the value of the Detention Centre site was roughly $60 million. The property for sale included the Wellington Detention Centre lands and the nearby Turfgrass Institute but not the buildings or land immediately around the former penal institution.

== Education ==
Four school boards operate in the city. The Upper Grand District School Board (UGDSB) administers all of Wellington County, as well as adjacent Dufferin County, while the Wellington Catholic District School Board (WCDSB) administers Catholic education in Wellington County, including Guelph. The Conseil scolaire de district catholique Centre-Sud offers French First language education for students with parents who had elementary and secondary education in French at École Saint-René-Goupil. The Conseil scolaire Viamonde, with similar entrance requirements, operates the École élémentaire L'Odyssée. Conseil scolaire catholique MonAvenir operates the École élémentaire catholique Saint-René-Goupil.

There are also numerous private schools in Guelph: Cornerstone Canadian Reformed Christian School, Resurrection Christian Academy, Guelph Community Christian School, Guelph Montessori School, Trillium Waldorf School, Wellington Hall Academy, and Wellington Montessori School, Echo Montessori. An International Baccalaureate Program is available at Guelph C.V.I and Bishop Macdonell C.H.S. Sacred Heart C.S. offers the IB Primary Years Program.

=== Secondary schools ===
All of Guelph's secondary schools belong to either the Upper Grand District School Board or the Wellington Catholic District School Board. The following is a list of all secondary schools in Guelph:

Public (Upper Grand District School Board):

- Centennial C.V.I.
- College Heights C.V.I.
- Guelph C.V.I.
- John F. Ross C.V.I.
- Two Rivers Secondary School

Catholic (Wellington Catholic District School Board):

- Our Lady of Lourdes C.H.S.
- Saint James C.H.S.
- Bishop Macdonell C.H.S.
- St. John Bosco High School

In January 2018, The Upper Grand District School Board announced new plans to build a secondary school northwest of the Victoria Road at Arkell Road intersection. The project is a part of Ontario's Ministry of Education's plan to build 30 new schools across the province and renovate 40 others. The new secondary school is expected to provide relief for the overpopulated Centennial C.V.I. (currently 40% overcapacity). The school is designed to accommodate 900 students and will cost the government $25.5 million. The school is expected to be complete by 2022.

=== Post-secondary institutions ===
- University of Guelph, (with approximately 25,300 students) is one of Canada's top comprehensive universities, and home to the Ontario Agricultural College and the Ontario Veterinary College.
- Conestoga College operates a small campus in Guelph but in late 2019, the college advised the news media that a major expansion was planned. "Within five or six years, we will have at least 5,000 students there ... [with] full-service programming.", said College President John Tibbits. At the time, the Guelph campus had approximately 1,000 students.

=== Public library system ===
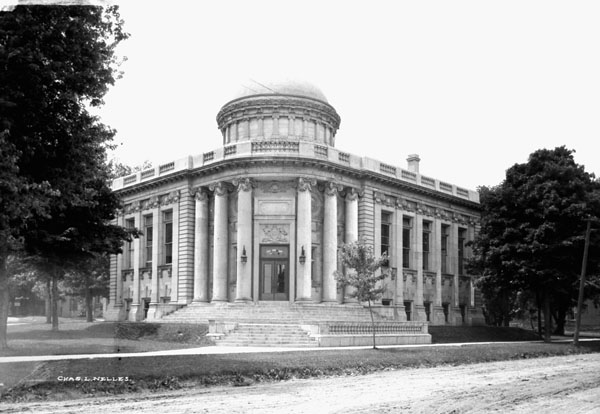
The original Carnegie library in Guelph.

Although a private library, run by the Farmers and Mechanics Institute, existed since 1832, a public library did not open in Guelph until 1882, when the Free Libraries Act allowed municipalities to operate libraries. After occupying premises near City Hall, it moved into an Andrew Carnegie-funded building in 1905. The neo-classical (Beaux Art) structure, had been designed in 1902 by W. Frye Colwill. The collection of the Farmers and Mechanics Institute library was contributed to the new library.

The current main library building of the Guelph Public Library, on Norfolk St. was opened in 1965. Guelph is served by a growing library system composed of a main library located in the downtown core, five branches and a Bookmobile. With a membership of over 85,000, the Guelph Public Library system's goals include preserving and indexing public materials relating to the history of Guelph. Although no formal program has been developed, the library acquires municipal records of archival value from the City of Guelph.

A new library location has been discussed since 2018 as part of the redeveloped area downtown, known as the Baker District. This project was approved as part of the 2021 budget and as of July 2021 the library board was reviewing architectural designs.

=== Museums ===
The City of Guelph operates Guelph Museums, including the Guelph Civic Museum which showcases the city's history with exhibits, an interactive gallery and special events; this facility has some 30,000 artifacts. Since 1983 when the city took over this facility, the Civic Museum has also operated McCrae House, the birthplace of Lieutenant-Colonel John McCrae (1872–1918), author of In Flanders Fields. The Museum also arranged for the restoration and placement of Locomotive 6167, a 1940s steam engine, which was located at the Guelph Central Station, but was moved to John Galt Park in November 2020 in order to make room at the station for future expansion of train service.

== Infrastructure ==
=== Medical facilities ===
The city currently has one hospital, Guelph General, which is rated as one of the safest in Canada in terms of the hospital standardized mortality ratio; the lower the better. Guelph's facility had a score of 78 in 2017, notably better than the national average of 91. By comparison, Cambridge Memorial Hospital had a score of 95. St. Joseph's Health Centre was previously a hospital, but is now a 240-bed long-term care home with a 91-bed specialty unit for complex continuing, rehabilitation and palliative care. Various outpatient services are also provided at this facility.

Another major facility, Homewood Health Centre offers treatment for mental health and addiction issues. The facility was founded in 1883 by the Homewood Retreat Association of Guelph as "a private asylum for the Insane and an Asylum for Inebriates" on a 19-acre property which included the Donald Guthrie house. The first patients were admitted in December of that year.

Homewood grew to a 312-bed mental and behavioural health facility and also formed a partnership with R.B. Schlegel Holdings Inc.to operate Oakwood Retirement Communities Inc., a long-term care facility.

=== Transportation ===
==== Bus ====
Guelph Transit provides local transportation around the city. On June 20, 2007, Guelph Transit launched a web-based system known as Next Bus. Intercity connections by GO Transit are made at the Guelph Central Station and University of Guelph.

==== Rail ====
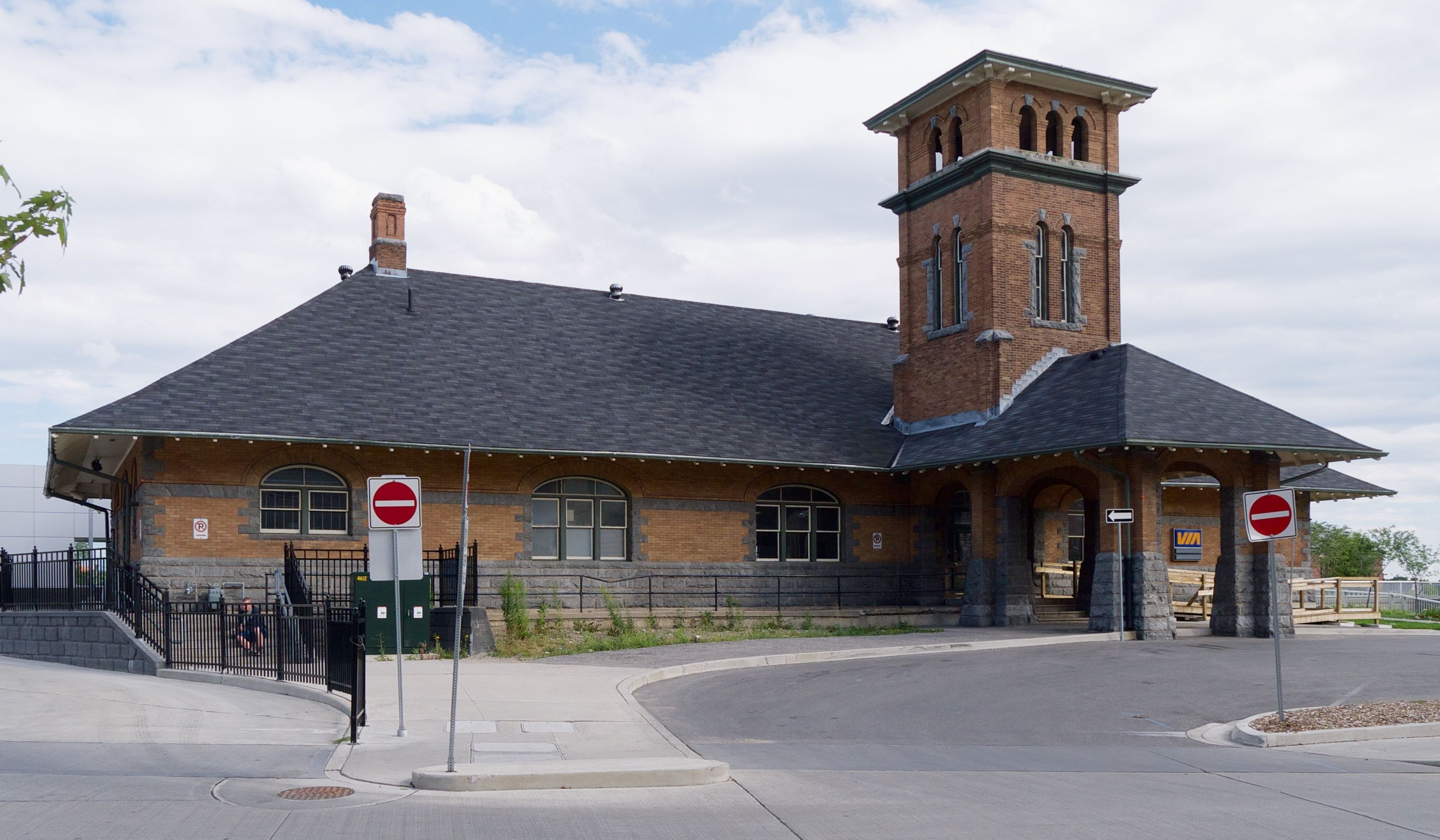
Guelph Central train station

Guelph was the first municipality in Canada to have its own federally chartered railway, the Guelph Junction Railway. This 25 kilometres (16 mi) link to the CPR is still municipally owned.

Built in 1911, the Guelph Central Station (still in use), was constructed by the Grand Trunk Railway which had arrived in Guelph in 1856; years later, it was taken over by the Canadian National Railway. It is a classic example of early 20th Century Canadian railway station design and has been designated as a heritage structure under the Heritage Railway Stations Protection Act. The Romanesque Revival building, with its Italianate tower, has been listed on the Canadian Register since 2006 and was formally recognized as one of Canada's Historic Places in November 1992. A renovation project in 2016-2017 provided various benefits, including repairs to maintain and restore heritage aspects.

There had also been passenger stations in Guelph that were built by the Canadian Pacific Railway. The first CPR station, from the 1800s, was the Priory House station, converted from the first house in Guelph. It stood opposite the current Priory Square and was eventually dismantled. Its replacement, located between Cardigan Street and the Speed River, was a brick building erected in 1911. After this brick building was no longer used as a rail station, it was converted for other purposes; eventually it was moved to the Galt area of Cambridge, Ontario.

==== Highways ====
- Highway 401 to Toronto and London.
- Highway 7 to Kitchener and Acton. The MTO has commenced construction of the Hanlon link to Kitchener, Ontario, a controlled-access highway running parallel to the existing Highway 7 from the Hanlon Expressway to Kitchener.
- Highway 6 to Hamilton and Owen Sound. This highway is known as the Hanlon Expressway for most of its length inside the city.

== Government ==
=== Municipal ===
The city is a single-tier municipality governed by a mayor-council system. The structure of the municipal government is stipulated by the Ontario Municipal Act of 2001. There are currently 12 councillors and a mayor, with two councillors representing each of the six wards. The mayor and members of the city council serve four-year terms without term limits, with the next election scheduled for October 2022. Prior to the 2006 election, the mayor and city councillors served three-year terms.

In 2018, incumbent Mayor Cam Guthrie was re-elected with 66.6% of the vote.

=== Provincial ===
Guelph provincial election results
Year	PC		New Democratic		Liberal		Green	
2022	20%	11,182	8%	4,413	13%	7,272	54%	29,764
2018	22%	14,121	22%	13,947	10%	6,545	45%	29,093

As of the 2018 election, Guelph occupies a single provincial riding of the same name, and is currently represented in the Legislative Assembly of Ontario by Mike Schreiner, the current leader of Ontario Green Party.

=== Federal ===
Guelph federal election results
Year	Liberal		Conservative		New Democratic		Green	
2021	42%	29,382	24%	16,795	21%	14,713	8%	5,250
2019	40%	30,545	19%	14,636	12%	9,320	25%	19,259

Guelph also occupies a federal riding of the same name. The member of Parliament is Dominique O'Rourke of the Liberal Party of Canada. In addition, a portion of Guelph is included in Wellington—Halton Hills North, represented by Conservative Party of Canada MP Michael Chong.

== Culture ==
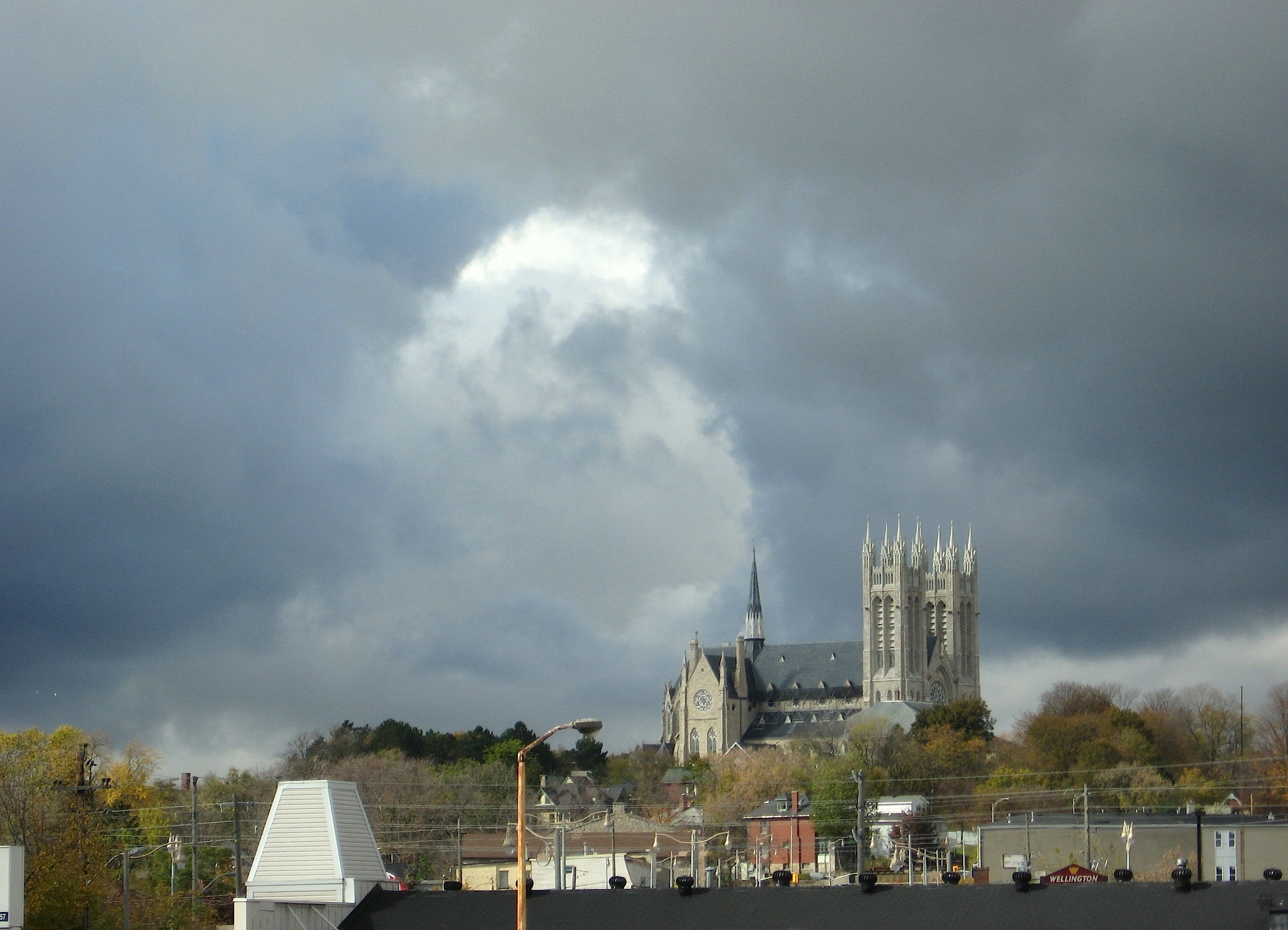
Basilica of Our Lady Immaculate, above city

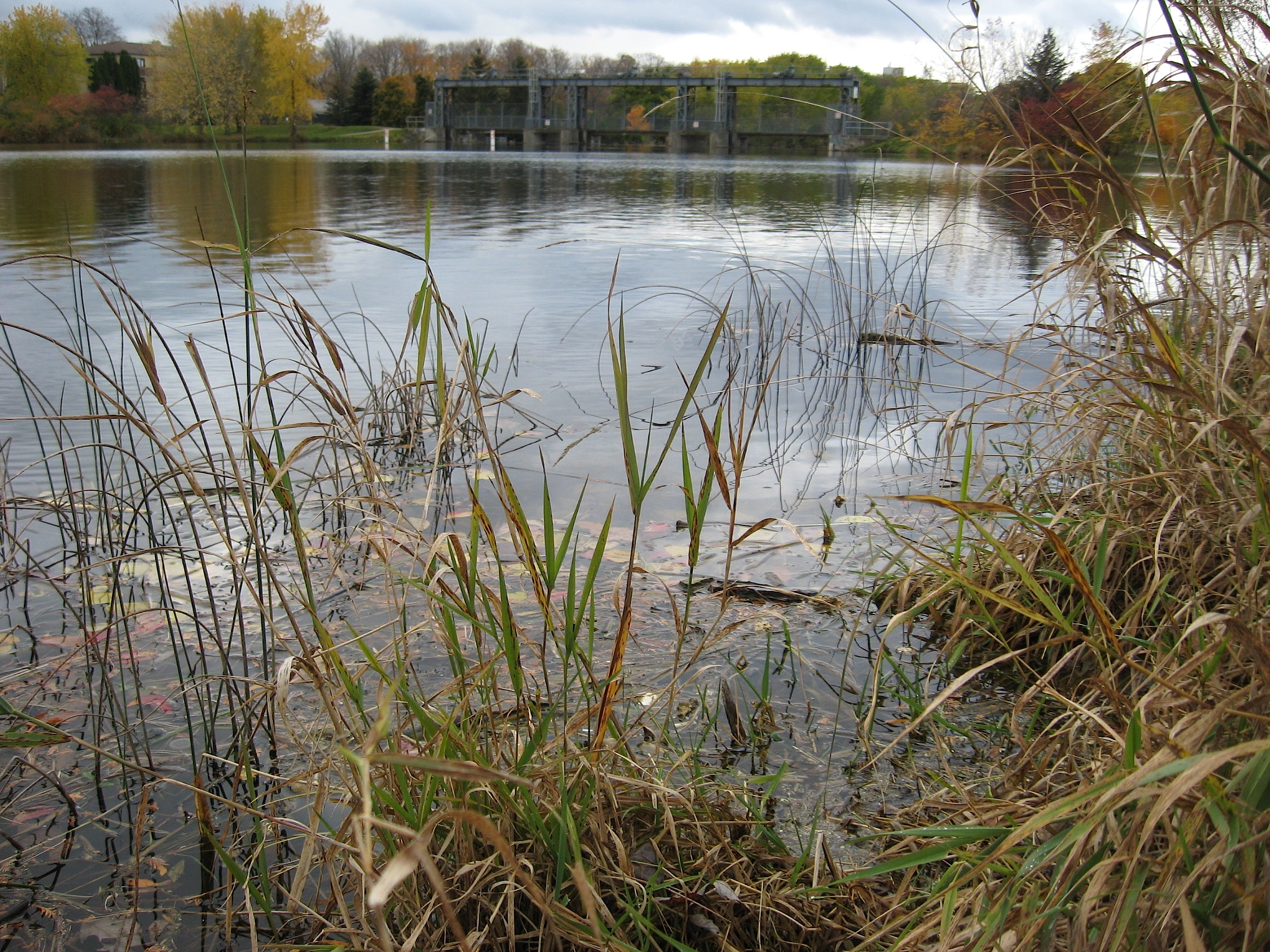
Riparian restoration

=== Historic sites ===
- Downtown Guelph: Several downtown streets are lined with Victorian era buildings now well over a century old. Many of Guelph's historically designated properties are in or near the downtown area. The old City Hall on Carden St., built between 1856 and 1857 and a National Historic Site, is an example of mid-19th century Renaissance Revival architecture. The building, as well as its Annex built c. 1865, are also historically designated by the province. Other historically designated buildings in the area include the Winter Fair Building, the County Jail and Governor's Residence and the Guelph Armoury. The Old Quebec Street Mall was a street built in the 1800s that was enclosed and covered; that work was completed in 1984 and the street has become an indoor shopping mall.

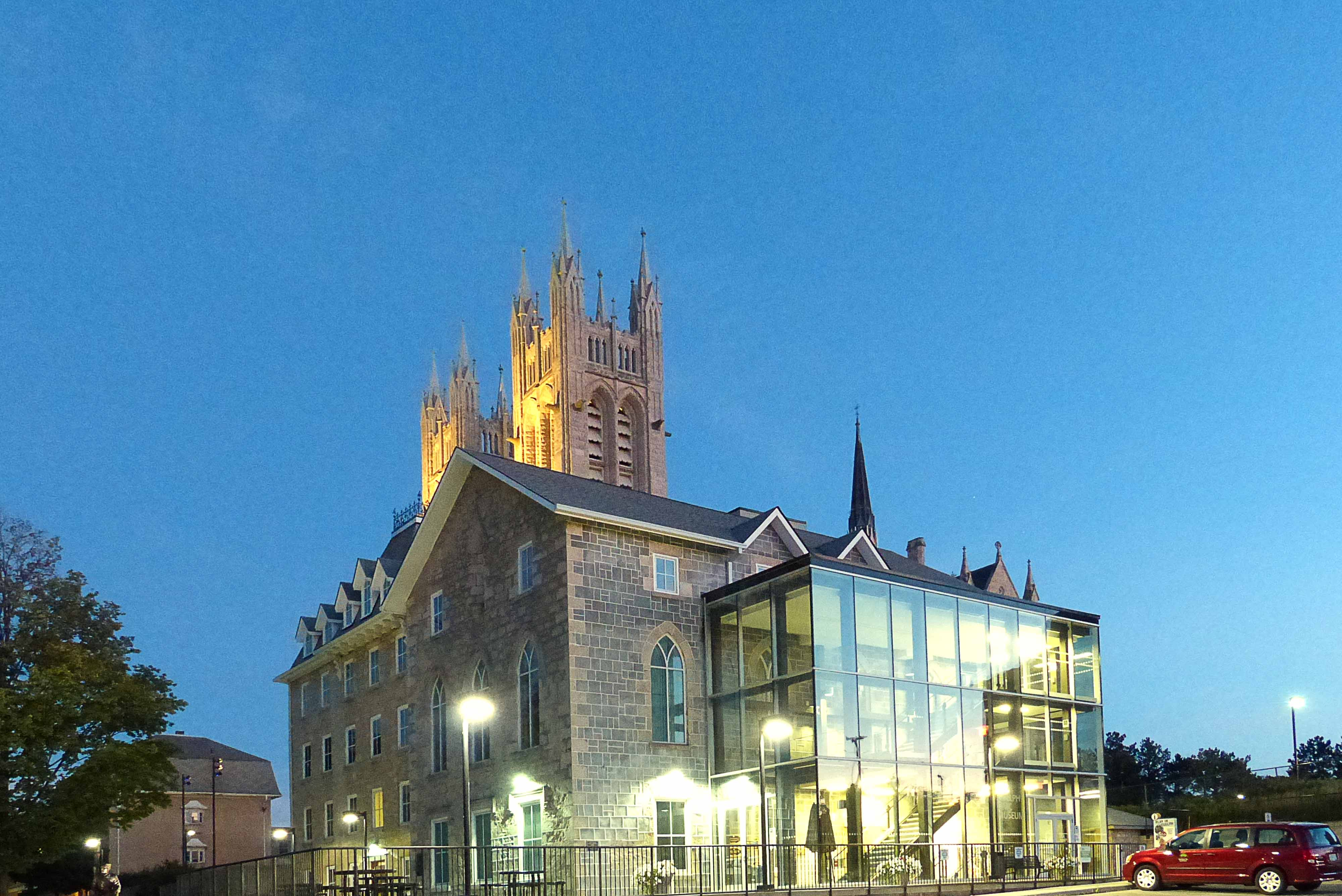
Guelph Civic Museum

- The Guelph Civic Museum has been located on "Catholic Hill" (Norfolk St. and Cork St.) adjacent to the Basilica of Our Lady Immaculate since 2012, moving to this location from a nationally designated historic site at 6 Dublin St. South. The museum has a collection of pictures, films and other antique materials related to the historical development of the City of Guelph.
- Among the oldest of the city's neighbourhoods, settled by affluent citizens, the St. George's Park area features heritage homes and mansions in the highest part of Guelph. Much of the city's elite lived on the hill running up Grange Street and many of the homes have been renovated.
- The Exhibition Park neighbourhood, containing the oldest park in Guelph, is an area that was settled in the 1870s and still contains many Victorian style heritage homes.
- The Brooklyn and College Hill area south of the Speed River is the city's only district that was designated under the Ontario Heritage Act.
- St. Patrick's Ward (The Ward) with many old buildings, originally contained both manufacturing facilities and modest homes. Many newcomers from Europe, particularly Italy, settled here after 1850.
- Allan's Mill

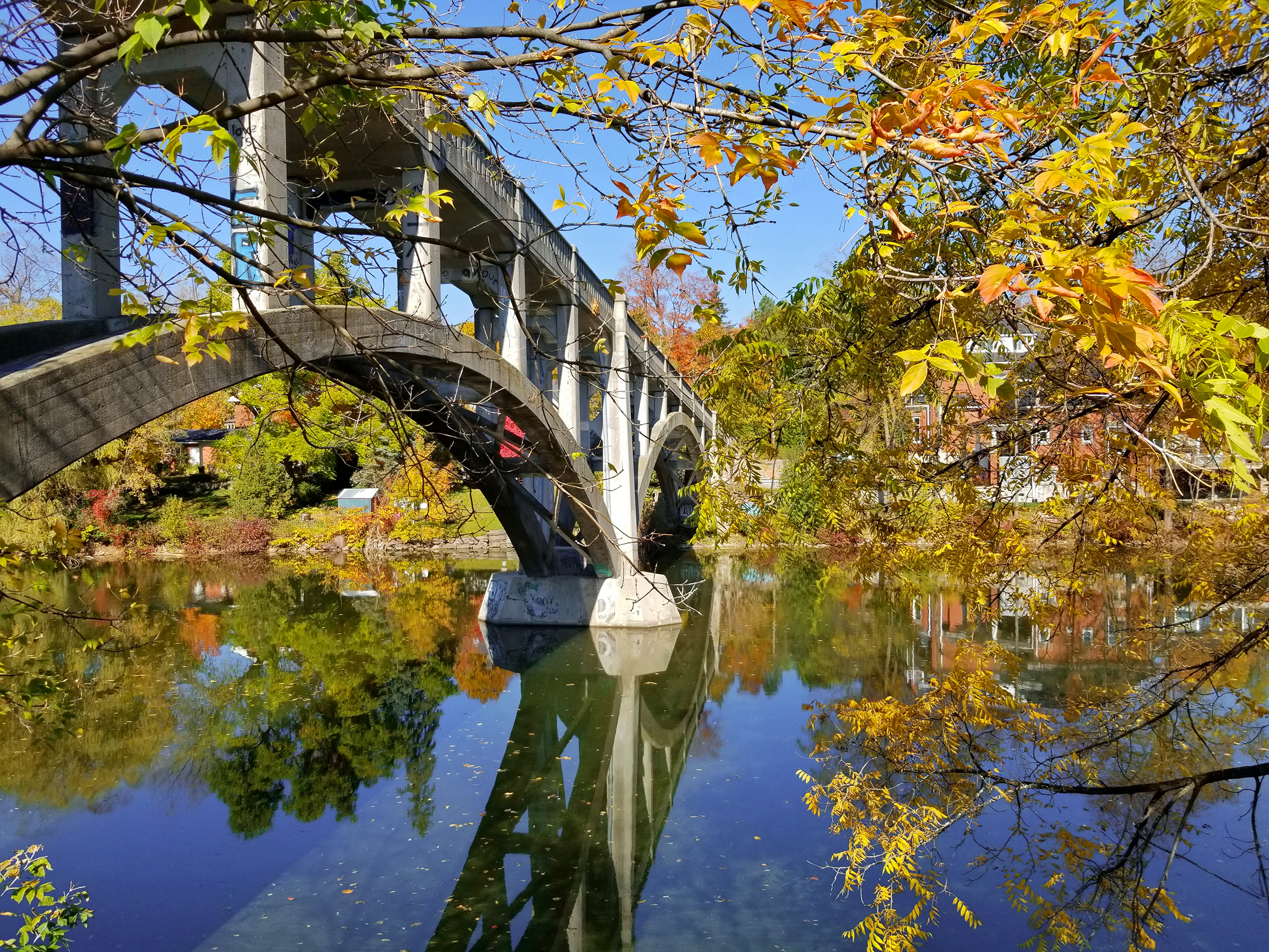
Heffernan Street Footbridge

- Heffernan Street Footbridge: Spanning the Speed River behind St. George's Anglican Church, this structure was built in 1913, and replaced an earlier steel bridge. The footbridge was designated a heritage site and was restored/reconstructed in 1991 to more closely resemble the original design
- Goldie Mill ruins: Once owned by the Goldie family, an important name in the early Waterloo Region, the mill was operated from 1866 until 1953 when a fire destroyed it. For some years, it served as a venue for outdoor public and private events but the area around the buildings was closed to the public in June 2017 due to soil contamination and sinkholes. Restoration of the ruins was underway in 2019, authorized by the owner, the Grand River Conservation Authority; the site to re-open to the public on February 18, 2021.

==== National Historic Sites ====
Nationally designated sites in the city include:

- Old City Hall, a formal, classical civic building; built in 1856–57.
- McCrae House, home of John McCrae, author of "In Flanders Fields", built in 1858.
- Basilica of Our Lady Immaculate, a Roman Catholic church designed by Joseph Connolly, located downtown, is a local landmark and a National Historic Site. The church was built over a number of years, specifically 1876 to 1888.

=== Outdoor attractions ===
Most of the natural attractions of Guelph are located beside the two rivers which pass inside the city, Speed River and Eramosa River.

- Guelph Lake
- University of Guelph Arboretum
- Riverside Park, located beside the Speed River at the north of Guelph
- York Road Park
- Hanlon Creek Park (Preservation Park)
- Royal City Park and Wellington Street nature sites

=== Festivals ===
- Guelph Contemporary Dance Festival
- Guelph Pride and Winter Pride
- Guelph and District Multicultural Festival
- Hillside Festival
- Guelph Spring Festival (1968–2006)
- Two Rivers Festival
- John Galt Day
- Guelph Jazz Festival
- Guelph Ribfest
- Guelph Festival of Moving Media
- Guelph Film Festival
- Vegfest Guelph
- Annual Exotic Car Show in Guelph

=== Arts facilities ===
- The Art Gallery of Guelph, formerly Macdonald Stewart Art Centre
- The Bookshelf Ebar Art Space
- Ed Video Media Arts Centre
- River Run Centre
- Guelph Youth Music Centre

== Media ==
=== Online media ===
GuelphToday.com is an online local news source in Guelph, offering the latest breaking news, weather updates, entertainment, sports and business features, obituaries and more.

=== Print media ===
The earliest newspaper published in Guelph was the Guelph Herald, which lasted for nine months after it was started in 1842 by Charles McDonnell. The Wellingtonian also lasted for only a short time in 1843. The next one to be published was The Advertiser in 1845. In 1847, the new Guelph Herald was established as a weekly.

Both of those publications disappeared but the city was served by a daily newspaper for 149 years until the Guelph Mercury ceased operations in January 2016 due to declining subscriptions and revenues. At the time, it was owned by Metroland Media Group which also owned the Guelph Tribune, a twice weekly publication with limited news coverage. The latter increased its reporting of local news, assumed publication of the Guelph and District Homes section and, in April 2016, took over operation of the Mercury website. At the same time, the newspaper re-branded with a new title, Guelph Mercury Tribune.

=== Radio ===
The city is served by two radio stations:

- Magic 106.1, CIMJ-FM, featuring hot adult contemporary music branded as Today's Best Mix
- CJOY, 1460, broadcasting an oldies format and branded as Greatest Hits

Both stations have been owned by Corus Entertainment since 2000. The University of Guelph station 93.3 CFRU-FM, Campus and Community Radio, has been broadcasting since 1980, currently at 250 watts.

Radio stations from Kitchener-Waterloo and CTV Kitchener, CKCO-DT television, also provide some coverage of Guelph news. Since 2011, CKCO has not been identified by its call letters.

=== Entertainment ===
The Sleeman Centre is a sports and entertainment venue in Guelph. The large, modern facility allows for a variety of events such as concerts, sporting and family events, trade shows and conferences, and it is home to the local hockey team, the Guelph Storm.

Apart from it, the city has Guelph Little Theatre, Guelph Concert Theatre and River Run Centre. Theatre studios of the University of Guelph also present their productions to the public on occasions.

=== Music ===
From a Bell Organ factory to the opera singer Edward Johnson, Guelph has been a source of musical contribution. Guelph has a thriving indie rock scene with many indie bands highlighted in the annual Kazoo Festival. Guelph is also home to the Hillside Festival, a hugely popular music festival held at nearby Guelph Lake during the summer, as well as the Guelph Jazz Festival.

Guelph is also home to the Guelph Symphony Orchestra, and two yearly classical music festivals. The Kiwanis Music Festival of Guelph showcases students from Guelph and surrounding areas, while the Guelph Musicfest offers performances by local professional classical musicians.

=== Sports teams ===
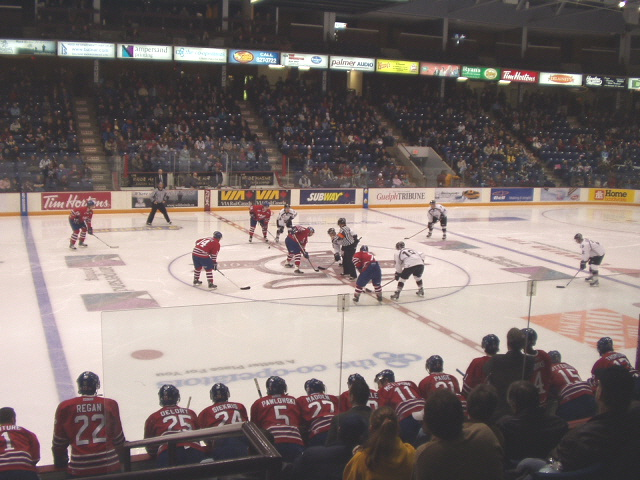
The Guelph Storm at home ice in 2006.

Club	League	Sport	Venue	Established	Championships
Guelph Storm	Ontario Hockey League	Hockey	Sleeman Centre	1991	4
Guelph Royals	Canadian Baseball League	Baseball	David E. Hastings Stadium at Exhibition Park	1919	8
Guelph Gryphons	U Sports	University	W.F. Mitchell Centre and Alumni Stadium	1874	1
Guelph United F.C.	Ontario Premier League	Soccer	Centennial Bowl	2021	1
Guelph Regals	Ontario Lacrosse Association	Lacrosse	Victoria Road Recreation Centre	1992	1
Grand River Gargoyles	Ontario Australian Football League	Australian Football	Margaret Greene Park	2001	0
Royal City Roller Derby	Women's Flat Track Derby Association	Roller Derby	Arenas in Guelph (Victoria Road Rec Centre, Exhibition Park, West End Rec Centre)	2010	0
Speed River Track and Field Club	Athletics Canada	Athletics	Alumni Stadium	1997	10
Guelph Rugby F.C.	Niagara Rugby Union, Ontario Women's League, Rugby Ontario (Junior Leagues)	Rugby Union	Eastview Community Park and Exhibition Park	2012	3
Guelph Cricket Club	United Friendly Cricket League	Cricket	Margaret Greene Park	2016	0

== Twin cities ==
- Castelfranco Veneto, Italy
- Riese Pio X, Italy
- Quetzaltenango, Guatemala
- Cusco, Peru

== See also ==
- Royal eponyms in Canada
- Geosign
