= Ed Video Media Arts Centre =

Coordinates: 43°32′58″N 80°13′38″W

Ed Video Media Arts Centre (aka Ed Video ) is an artist-run centre with a focus on video art, but also serving all forms of media art. The organization Ed Video Incorporated was officially formed in 1976 in Guelph, Ontario, Canada and has since gained non-profit and then charitable status.

Ed Video is a hub for video, film and media artists working at a range of experience and financial levels. The centre supports these artists with affordable access to production equipment, training, social events, and a year-long gallery program. It is Guelph's only artist-run centre and one of these oldest organizations of its kind within Canada.

== Members and contributors ==
Many of Canada's most notable video and media artists have accessed the support of Ed Video, taught workshops at the centre, or exhibited through the organization's exhibition program. Over the years the centre's exhibition space has acted as an alternative venue for many up and coming Canadian music acts. Contributors, exhibitors and members (past and present) have included Canadian and international artists such as:

- Sara Angelucci
- Chad Archibald
- Janet Cardiff
- Philip Carrer
- Nick DenBoer
- Kenneth Doren
- Nora Hutchinson
- Eduardo Kac
- Stan Krzyzanowski
- John Kilduff
- Riaz Mehmood
- Jenn E. Norton
- Aubrey Reeves
- Kelly Richardson
- Tasman Richardson
- Jim Riley
- Erin MacIndoe Sproule
- Jeff Winch
- Lisa Conway
