= Geosign =

Internet Media Company

Geosign Corporation
- Company type: Private
- Industry: web publishing, PPC Arbitrage
- Founded: 2001
- Headquarters: Guelph, Ontario
- Key people: Tim Nye, Founder; Ted Hastings, President

Geosign, based out of Guelph, Ontario was an Internet media company focused on online publishing and targeted search.

== History ==
Geosign owned over 180 websites in 20 different categories. Geosign claimed to receive over 35 million unique visitors to its collection of sites every month. Some of Geosign’s notable sites included GizmoCafe.com, ThinkFashion.com, TheRenewablePlanet.com. Tim Nye was Geosign’s Chairman and founder.

In March 2007, American Capital Strategies invested $160 million in Geosign.

In November 2007, the company's assets were reportedly divided between Moxy Media, a wholly owned subsidiary of American Capital Strategies, and eMedia Interactive Inc., controlled by Tim Nye.

== See also ==
- Online publishing
