= Allan's Mill =

Former watermill in Guelph, Ontario, Canada

Coordinates: 43.5468°N 80.2433°W

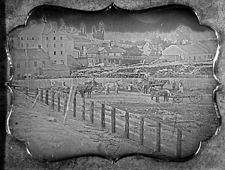
- View from Allan's Mill, 1855
- Location: Guelph, Ontario, Canada
- Owner: Horace Perry
- Further ownership: William Allan (1832); David Spence (c. 1877)

Construction
- Built: 1830 (wooden mill)
- Renovated: c. 1850 (rebuilt in stone)

Allan's Mill was a watermill located on both banks of the Speed River in Guelph, Ontario, Canada. Part of the site is now listed under the Ontario Heritage Act.

== Allan's Mill ==
The first industrial establishment in Guelph, the original wooden mill was built in 1830 for the Canada Company by Horace Perry, who sited it on the west (right) bank of the Speed River. The mill was sold to William Allan in 1832, who operated it as a grist and flour mill; by 1836, the mill complex was expanded on both sides of the river to include a distillery, a brewery, and a wool carding house operated by William and his son David Allan. Around 1850, the original wooden structure was removed and replaced with one made of limestone, and a bridge was added across the river, connecting the two halves of the mill. Old reports state that the new grist mill building had cylindrical turrets, such as those found in Scotland. The distillery sold large quantities of whisky and other spirits. Around 1877, the Allan family sold the mill to David Spence of Brantford; it remained in operation as a flour mill until a series of fires gutted the building.

== Later developments on the site ==
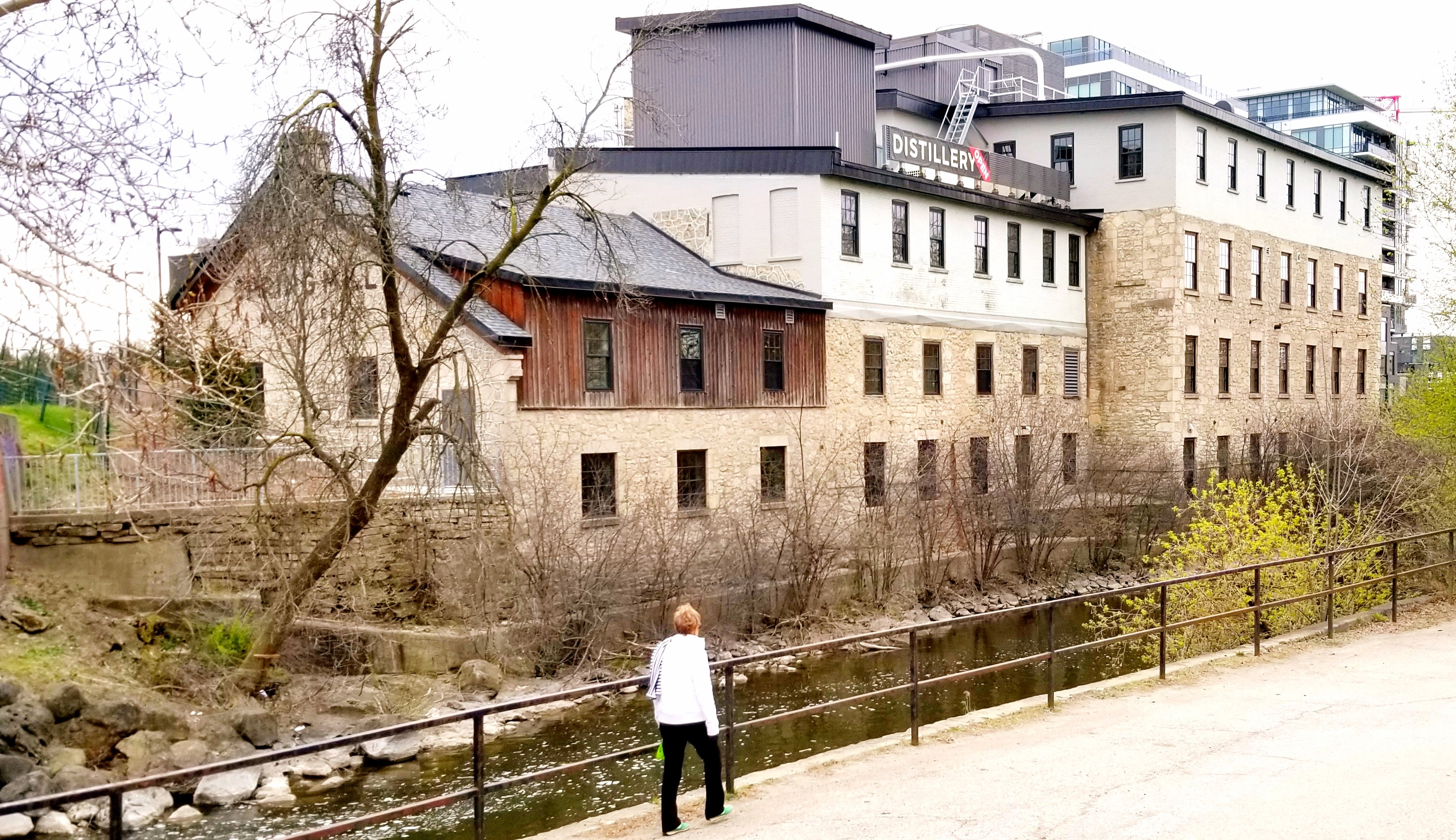
The Spring Mill Distillery (2020) in the mill building which once housed Allan's Distillery.

The site on the west bank of the river later became home to several industries, including the Flexible Conduit Company (later the Dalyte Electric Co.) which occupied the site between 1909 and 1929. In the 1960s, the site was home to a feed and seed business and a plastics firm, until the buildings were destroyed by fire in 1966. The ruins of the stone building are now a part of Guelph's Heritage Park.

On the east bank of the river, the Arthur Street building which had previously housed the distillery became home to a variety of companies: it first housed the McCrae Woollen Company until 1900 when the A.R. Woodyatt (later Taylor-Forbes) foundry purchased the site. Taylor-Forbes occupied the site until its 1955 bankruptcy; the site was sold to the W. C. Wood Company and was then used to manufacture appliances until the business was shut down in 2010.

After a period of brownfield restoration, construction began in 2014 on The Metalworks, a new condominium apartment complex on the site of the old W. C. Wood factory. In 2019, as part of the Metalworks development, the Spring Mill Distillery was opened on the site, occupying the same building originally built for the Allan Distillery nearly two centuries before.
