= River Run Centre =

Performing arts centre in Guelph, Ontario, Canada

Coordinates: 43.54771°N 80.24616°W

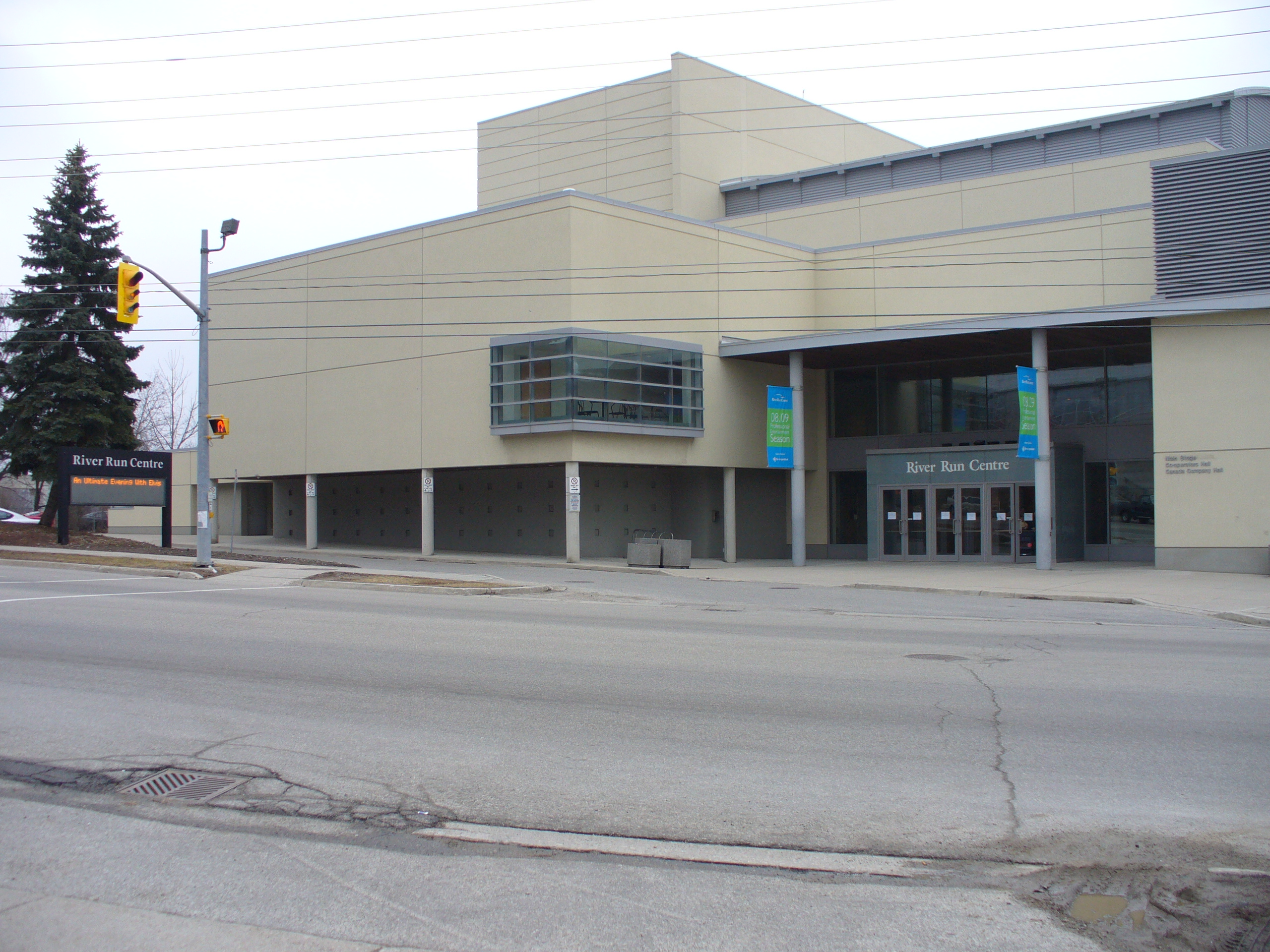
- Interactive map of River Run Centre
- Address: Guelph, Ontario
- Type: Performing arts centre
- Current use: Professional and amateur theatre

Construction
- Opened: October 4, 1997
- Years active: 1997–present

Website
- riverrun.ca

The River Run Centre is a performing arts centre in Guelph, Ontario, Canada.

Construction of the facility began in 1995 and cost $15 million. It officially opened on October 4, 1997.

== Halls ==
The facility has three halls:

- The Main Hall, which can seat 785
- The Co-operators Hall, which seats 225
- The Canada Company Hall
