= Guelph Public Library =

Public library system in Guelph, Canada

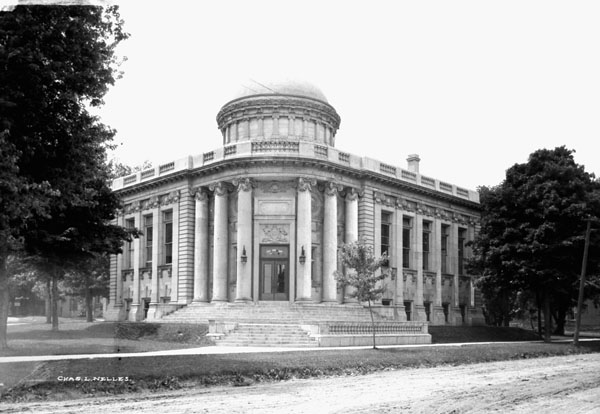
- Carnegie library building in Guelph 1905-1964
- 43.5456°N 80.2529°W
- Location: 100 Norfolk Street; Guelph, Ontario; N1H 4J6
- Established: 1850
- Branches: 7

Collection
- Items collected: business directories, government publications, non-fiction and fiction books, periodicals, genealogy, local history, DVDs, CDs

Other information
- Director: Dan Atkins, CEO
- Website: Guelph Public Library

Guelph Public Library is a public library system serving the city of Guelph, Ontario, Canada. The main library downtown, five branches, and a bookmobile (seven branches total) serve about 123,000 residents in Guelph. The current CEO is Dan Atkins.

== Branches ==
- Bullfrog Mall
- Bookmobile
- East Side
- Main
- Scottsdale
- West End
- Westminster

== History ==
In 1883, the Guelph Public Library was the first public library in Ontario established under the Public Library Act of 1882. The collection of the Farmers and Mechanics Institute library, which had been a free public lending library since 1850, was contributed to the newly founded Guelph Public Library.

The first library building was completed in September 1905 at the corner of Norfolk and Paisley streets downtown, partly through a Carnegie Foundation grant of $24,000. The neo-classical (Beaux Art) structure, had been designed in 1902 by W. Frye Colwill. According to a University publication, "The library permitted free access, used the Dewey Decimal system classification, and provided a card catalogue. The motto, "Floreat Scientia" ("Let Knowledge Grow") was carved above the stone entrance. A special Guelph feature was its dome, one of the few built in this fashion in Canada". It was demolished in 1964 in spite of public opposition, and replaced with the current structure on Norfolk St.

A new public library may be built near the Baker St. parking lot, which is to be redeveloped as the Baker District. Preliminary discussions about a new main branch had taken place by summer 2017 with some decision expected to be made in 2018. Construction is expected to be completed in 2026.
