= Beethoven's cello sonatas =

Beethoven's Cello sonatas may refer to:

- Cello Sonatas Nos. 1 and 2 (Beethoven) (F major & G minor)
- Cello Sonata No. 3 in A major (Beethoven)
- Cello Sonatas Nos. 4 and 5 (Beethoven) ( C & D major)
