= Dead Rush =

- Developer: Treyarch
- Publisher: Activision
- Platforms: PlayStation 2 GameCube; Xbox
- Release: Cancelled
- Genre: Racing

Dead Rush is a cancelled video game that was designed by Treyarch and would have been published by Activision for the PlayStation 2, GameCube and Xbox.

The game would have taken place in the town of Eastport where a massive earthquake has destroyed most of humanity. As Jake, a character suffering from memory loss, the player's job was to try to find out exactly what happened in Eastport, which is now overflowing with zombies.

As Jake, players could operate one of several vehicles scattered around town. Not only would this provide the player with a means of transportation but it would also serve as armour of sorts. The zombies in Eastport would try to wreck whatever car Jake was driving, but the player could create new vehicles out of parts of previously demolished cars. A female mechanic could also put new parts and items on cars that would be more powerful.

The game would have featured few load times, as after an initial boot up the game would never pause to load data from the disc again.

The game was announced at E3 2004 and set to be released in 2005. It was cancelled shortly thereafter due to "not meeting standards". An E3 preview in Nintendo Power magazine dubbed the gameplay "Grand Theft Undead", while Official UK PlayStation 2 Magazine called it "Grand Theft Evil".
