= 2014 Oxford County municipal elections =

Local election in Ontario, Canada

Elections were held in Oxford County, Ontario on October 27, 2014 in conjunction with municipal elections across the province.

== Oxford County Council ==
County council consists of the mayors of the municipalities plus two "city and county" councillors from Woodstock.

Position	Elected
Blandford-Blenheim Mayor	Marion Wearn
East Zorra-Tavistock Mayor	Donald McKay (acclaimed)
Ingersoll Mayor	Ted Comiskey
Norwich Mayor	Larry Martin
South-West Oxford Mayor	David Mayberry
Tilsonburg Mayor	Stephen Molnar
Woodstock Mayor	Trevor T. Birtch
Woodstock Councillor	Deb Tait
Woodstock Councillor	Sandra J. Talbot
Zorra Mayor	Margaret Lupton

== Blandford-Blenheim ==
Mayoral Candidate	Vote	%
Marion Wearn (X)	1,127	60.79
Jeffrey Glendinning	727	39.21

== East Zorra-Tavistock ==
Mayoral Candidate	Vote	%
Donald McKay (X)	Acclaimed	

== Ingersoll ==
Mayoral Candidate	Vote	%
Ted Comiskey (X)	2,930	74.21
Tim Lobzun	1,018	25.79

== Norwich ==
Mayoral Candidate	Vote	%
Larry Martin	1,564	52.70
Donald Doan (X)	1,404	47.30

== South-West Oxford ==
Mayoral Candidate	Vote	%
David Mayberry (X)	1,898	91.38
George Van Dorp	179	8.62

== Tillsonburg ==
Mayoral Candidate	Vote	%
Stephen Molnar	1,689	35.94
Marty Klein	1,519	32.33
Mark Renaud	1,491	31.73

== Woodstock ==
Mayoral Candidate	Vote	%
Trevor T. Birtch	3,461	40.07
Pat Sobeski (X)	2,919	33.79
Michael Harding	2,258	26.14

== Zorra ==
Mayoral Candidate	Vote	%
Margaret Lupton (X)	1,774	58.03
Gordon MacKay	1,283	41.97
