= 2018 Oxford County municipal elections =

Local election in Ontario, Canada

Elections were held in Oxford County, Ontario on October 22, 2018 in conjunction with municipal elections across the province.

== Oxford County Council ==
County council consists of the mayors of the municipalities plus two "city and county" councillors from Woodstock.

Position	Elected
Blandford-Blenheim Mayor	Mark Peterson
East Zorra-Tavistock Mayor	Don McKay
Ingersoll Mayor	Ted Comiskey
Norwich Mayor	Larry Martin
South-West Oxford Mayor	David Mayberry (acclaimed)
Tilsonburg Mayor	Stephen Molnar
Woodstock Mayor	Trevor Birtch
Woodstock Councillor	Sandra J. Talbot
Woodstock Councillor	Deb Tait
Zorra Mayor	Marcus Ryan

== Blandford-Blenheim ==
=== Mayor ===
Mayoral Candidate	Vote	%
Mark Peterson	1,850	90.07
John Mailloux	204	9.93

=== Township Councillors ===
4 to be elected, electors have multiple votes

Candidate	Vote	%
Justin Read	1,382	20.26
Nancy Demarest	1,235	18.10
Randy Balzer (X)	986	14.45
G Bruce Banbury (X)	823	12.06
William Bell	734	10.76
Kent Jordan	647	9.48
Charles Doering	442	6.48
Hewitt Bryan	375	5.49
Ron Behm	196	2.87

== East Zorra-Tavistock ==
=== Mayor ===
Mayoral Candidate	Vote	%
Don McKay (X)	1,234	58.62
Maureen Ralph	871	41.38

=== Township Councillors ===
Elected from multi-member wards

==== Ward 1 ====
Candidate	Vote	%
Philip Schaefer	774	46.88
Margaret Lupton	610	36.94
Thomas Murray	267	16.17

==== Ward 2 ====
Candidate	Vote	%
Scott Rudy	Acclaimed	

==== Ward 3 ====
Candidate	Vote	%
Jeremy Smith (X)	Acclaimed	
Matthew Gillespie	Acclaimed	

== Ingersoll ==
=== Mayor ===
Mayoral Candidate	Vote	%
Ted Comiskey (X)	1,833	44.84
Paul Holbrough	1,365	33.39
Tim Lobzun	889	21.75

=== Town Councillors ===
5 to be elected, electors have multiple votes

Candidate	Vote	%
Kristy Van Kooten-Bossence (X)	2,129	11.95
Rick Eus	2,020	11.34
Brian Petrie (X)	1,868	10.48
Gordon Lesser (X)	1,679	9.42
Michael Bowman (X)	1,572	8.82
Cathy Mott	1,509	8.47
Kirk Franklin	1,484	8.33
Dick Huntley	1,324	7.43
Tammy Jeffery-Larder	1,150	6.45
John Bell	1,039	5.83
Becci Verbrugge	993	5.57
Eric Berridge	523	2.93
Maria Sikal	521	2.92

== Norwich ==
=== Mayor ===
Mayoral Candidate	Vote	%
Larry Martin (X)	2,374	81.83
Tara King	527	18.17

=== Township Councillors ===
==== Ward 1 ====
Candidate	Vote	%
John Scholten (X)	632	83.04
Tyler Zacher-King	129	16.95

==== Ward 2 ====
Candidate	Vote	%
Lynne DePlancke (X)	481	53.50
John Palmer	325	36.15
Scott Takacs	93	10.34

==== Ward 3 ====
Candidate	Vote	%
Jim Palmer (X)	Acclaimed	

==== Ward 4 ====
Candidate	Vote	%
Alan Dale	286	56.85
Ed Atfield	217	43.14

== South-West Oxford ==
=== Mayor ===
Mayoral Candidate	Vote	%
David Mayberry (X)	Acclaimed	

=== Township Councillors ===
==== Ward 1 ====
Candidate	Vote	%
Paul Buchner	Acclaimed	

==== Ward 2 ====
Candidate	Vote	%
Peter Ypma	152	57.35
Debbie Kasman	113	42.64

==== Ward 3 ====
Candidate	Vote	%
Valerie Durston (X)	Acclaimed	

==== Ward 4 ====
Candidate	Vote	%
George Way (X)	Acclaimed	

==== Ward 5 ====
Candidate	Vote	%
Jim Pickard (X)	Acclaimed	

==== Ward 6 ====
Candidate	Vote	%
Craig Gillis	157	68.26
Geoffrey Innes	57	24.78
Kelly Anne Cowell	16	6.95

== Tillsonburg ==
=== Mayor ===
Mayoral Candidate	Vote	%
Stephen Molnar (X)	2,909	60.08
Mark Renaud	1,933	39.92

=== Town Councillors ===
5 to be elected, electors have multiple votes

Candidate	Vote	%
Dave Beres (X)	3,304	13.78
Pete Luciani	2,906	12.12
Deb Gilvesy	2,894	12.07
Penny Esseltine (X)	2,395	9.99
Chris Rosehart (X)	2,288	9.54
Chris Parker	1,904	7.94
Michael Holly	1,867	7.79
Max Adam (X)	1,811	7.55
Cindy Allen	1,616	6.74
Sherry Hamilton	1,522	6.35
Kim Sage	839	3.50
James Murphy	618	2.57

== Woodstock ==
=== Mayor ===
Mayoral Candidate	Vote	%
Trevor Birtch (X)	5,412	58.73
Shawn Shapton	3,664	39.76
Gabriel Rose	138	0.14

The results for Woodstock City Council are as follows:

=== City-County Councillor ===
2 to be elected

Candidate	Vote	%
Sandra J. Talbot (X)	5,135	32.39
Deb Tait (X)	5,104	32.19
Michael Harding	3,040	19.17
Naseeb Singh	1,749	11.03
Peter Croves	826	5.21

=== City Councillor ===
4 to be elected

Candidate	Vote	%
Jerry Acchione (X)	5,483	18.91
Ron Fraser	5,282	18.22
Connie Lauder (X)	4,969	17.14
Mark Schadenberg	4,345	14.98
Kate Leatherbarrow	4,286	14.78
Ross Gerrie	3,395	11.71
Collin Matthews	1,236	4.26

== Zorra ==
=== Mayor ===
Mayoral Candidate	Vote	%
Marcus Ryan	1,639	60.97
Doug Matheson	1,049	39.03

=== Township Councillors ===
==== Ward 1 ====
Candidate	Vote	%
Ron Forbes (X)	385	68.75
Betty Bartram	175	31.25

==== Ward 2 ====
Candidate	Vote	%
Katie Davies	Acclaimed	

==== Ward 3 ====
Candidate	Vote	%
Paul Mitchell	706	85.67
Michael Kukhta	118	14.32

==== Ward 4 ====
Candidate	Vote	%
Steven Macdonald	Acclaimed	
