= Ratho (disambiguation) =

Ratho is a village in Edinburgh, Scotland.

Ratho may also refer to:

- Ratho (or Rasso), a German saint
- Ratho, Ontario, a municipality in Ontario

== See also ==
- Ratho Station, a suburb of Edinburgh
