= The News and Eastern Townships Advocate =

Quebec newspaper

The News and Eastern Townships Advocate is a newspaper based in Saint-Jean-sur-Richelieu, Quebec started on January 27, 1848.

The headquarters for the paper were destroyed in 1942 during a fire, which resulted in the loss of the building and files documenting the company's early history.

The paper was originally named The Missisqoui News and Frontier Advocate and was based in Phillipsburg, Ontario, but was moved to St Johns in 1850 and renamed to Frontier, Advocate.
