= Drumbo Fall Fair =

Three-day annual agricultural event in Ontario, Canada

The Drumbo Fall Fair is a three-day annual agricultural event which takes place in the village of Drumbo, Blandford-Blenheim township, Oxford County, Ontario, Canada. The fairgrounds are at 42 Center Street, a few minutes from the 401 highway. The fair is held annually on the third weekend after Labour Day.

== History ==
The first fair in Blenheim Township, Oxford County, was held in 1850 as a community event on John Spiers Farm, just outside of Drumbo. It started as an opportunity for local farmers to showcase their crops and livestock. The cattle show was one of the original activities when the fair started, and it has continued on today.

The second year the Drumbo Fall Fair, which was still known as a local picnic for local farming families, was held on William Dicksons’ farm. for the next few years a picnic was held on a different farm each year.

On October 7, 1856, the first official Drumbo Fall Fair was held. The Muma farm north of Drumbo was chosen because of their new barn. People officially registered their products, in hopes of gaining a prize. Some of the categories were crops, produce, handcrafts, and more to show off as well as having the new barn for the horse show.

The fair continued to move around the three local towns of Drumbo, Princeton, and Plattsville until 1891, when the Blenheim Agricultural Society set up permanent buildings in the town of Drumbo. These buildings were used until 1905, after which the exhibits were shown on the premises of the Drumbo Curling Club. On January 9, 1907, the Blenheim Agricultural Society changed its name to the Drumbo Agricultural Society.

In 1967, a new Agricultural Hall was built and a new Exhibit Hall followed in the 1980s. The hall is used for various community functions during the remainder of the year. In 2006, the Drumbo Agricultural Hall underwent renovation.

In 2020 the Fair was cancelled due to the COVID-19 pandemic, the first time in 169-years. The Fair resumed on September 24–26, 2021.

== Fair activities ==
The fair begins with the official Friday Night Opening, which includes a pie auction, the announcement of the top prizewinners of the exhibits, and homemade pies. Following intermission the featured entertainment performs on a stage that resembles the Grand Ole Opry. The entertainment has included the locally and regionally known musicians who sing tributes to country legends such as Johnny Cash and Patsy Cline.

The Drumbo Fall Fair has engaged children and adults throughout the years with foot races, games, livestock shows, and the baking competition. In the 1940s to the 1950s, the Drumbo Fall Fair incorporated the Blenheim Township School Fair, and since then the schools in the township contribute to a children's art display.

There are many different activities that the fair has created and elaborated throughout the years. It has remained close to its original roots, with the small competitions between neighbours. Now there are over 100 different class sections for competition. These include the horse shows, 4-H, crops, arts and crafts, flowers, baking and more.

Many events at the Fair celebrate and provide experiences with agriculture and family-farm traditions. Saturday and Sunday include horse shows, a beef show, Old McDonald's Farm featuring an exhibit of local farm animals, exhibition buildings and tents filled with hundreds of entries featuring home baking competitions, quilt and handicrafts, flowers, garden vegetables, grain and corn, antiques, photo contest and the largest exhibition is the children's tent, with ribbon winning entries from craft and baking creations, to junior farmers displaying their fruits and vegetables. The Baby Show brings babies from all around the local communities and the "Chip off the old Block" contest is where two family members enter who look similar to the one another. There is also live music and family entertainment.

Each year, the fair chooses a theme for some elements of the fair, including the exhibit categories and entertainment. In 2011 the theme was locally produced food; in 2012 the fair introduced an amateur winemaking competition; and in 2013 the theme was "Homemade Pies and Family Ties!". In 2014 the theme "Cats and Dogs" led to dog agility shows, the Pet Show, and children's pet-related events.

The fair runs on a "pay one price" model, with daily and weekend passes which include horse-drawn wagon rides, a playground formed from giant bales of hay and a candy toss.

Each year the Fair selects an ambassador who represents Drumbo at the Canadian National Exhibition Ambassador of the Fair contest.
