= Punkeydoodles Corners =

- Unincorporated community
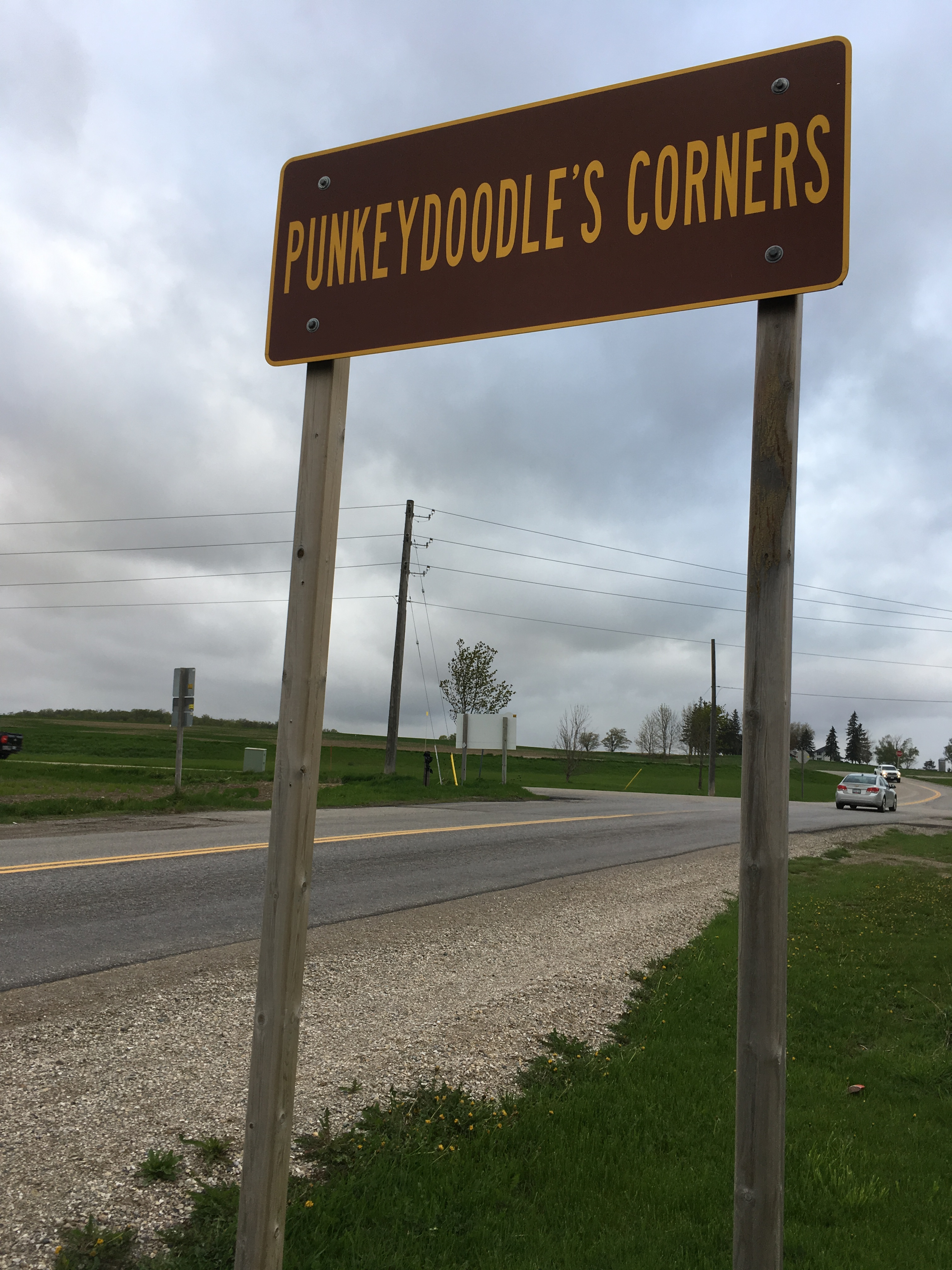
- Interactive map of Punkeydoodles Corners
- Coordinates: 43°21′13″N 80°44′3″W
- Country: Canada
- Province: Ontario
- Regional municipality: Waterloo
- Township: Wilmot
- Time zone: UTC-5 (EST)
  - Summer (DST): UTC-4 (EDT)
- Forward sortation area: N3A
- Area codes: 519 and 226
- NTS Map: 040P07
- GNBC Code: FCIUX

Punkeydoodles Corners is an unincorporated hamlet in southwestern Ontario, in Canada, known for its strange name and frequent sign theft. Although primarily located in the Wilmot Township, some portions of the hamlet extend into East Zorra – Tavistock and Perth East Townships. The origin of the name is somewhat disputed. Most claims date back to an inn and tavern located at the Corner during the late nineteenth century. The most frequently cited legend claims that the local German-speaking inn-keeper was given the name Punkey Doodle after he mispronounced the words of the song Yankee Doodle, which sounded more like "Punkey Doodle" to the tavern guests. Other stories link the name to an old Victorian nursery word for frittering away time, or a nickname given to a lazy pumpkin farmer by his irritated wife. There have been suggestions that pumpkins were an early crop locally. "Corners" refers to both the geographical feature of the intersecting roads as well as the convergence of Waterloo Region, Oxford County, and Perth County.

The most prominent moment in Punkeydoodles Corners history was Canada Day 1982, when Joe Clark was present for festivities. A post office was opened for one day to issue commemorative stamps.

While the spelling and punctuation vary in common usage, the version recognized by both Statistics Canada and the Canadian Geographical Names Data Base is "Punkeydoodles Corners".

The name of the hamlet frequently appears in lists of humorous place names.

The intersections at Punkeydoodles Corners have also been noted as being a particularly dangerous for drivers. In 2024, Punkeydoodles Corners was the subject of a $1.08 million roadwork project intended to improve driver safety which included reducing the number of the intersections from three to one - including the permanent closure of the west leg of Punkeydoodles Avenue at Perth Road 101 and the north leg of Township Road 11 at the intersection with Perth Road 101, and realignment of the single remaining intersection at Oxford Road 5 - pavement reconstruction, new deceleration lanes, additional street lighting and improved signage.

== See also ==
- List of unincorporated communities in Ontario
