= Ratho, Ontario =

Coordinates: 43.284°N 80.708°W

Location of Ratho in Ontario

Ratho is a dispersed rural community located in the township of Blandford-Blenheim in Oxford County in southwestern Ontario. Located in old Blandford Township, at its centre are the Ratho Presbyterian Cemetery, a church and an old general store.

== History ==
The hamlet was named by its original settlers for Ratho, a village in the Rural West Edinburgh area of Edinburgh, Scotland.
