= Katherine M. Yates =

Canadian-American writer (1865–1951)

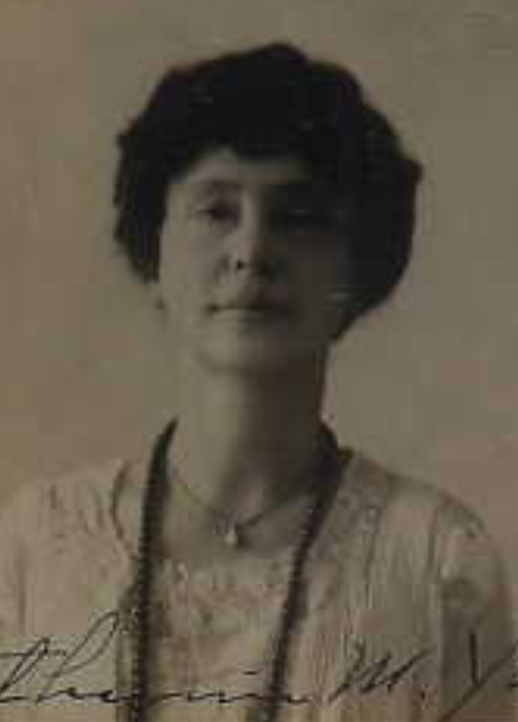
- Katherine M. Yates, from a 1919 passport application
- Born: Katherine Merritte Snyder; November 12, 1865; Drumbo, Ontario, Canada
- Died: October 25, 1951 (age 85); Laguna Beach, California, U.S.
- Other names: E. E. Steven, Katherine P. Mayhew
- Occupation: Writer

Katherine Merritte Snyder Yates (November 12, 1865 – October 25, 1951) was a Canadian-American writer, mainly of children's books. She lived in Honolulu from 1910 to 1942.

== Biography ==
Yates was born in Drumbo, Ontario, the daughter of Peter M. Snyder and Julia P. Turner Snyder. Katherine Snyder married American writer Ralph T. Yates in 1889. They divorced in 1910, and she lived in Honolulu from 1910 to 1942, and wrote about travel in Hawaii for National Geographic and Sunset Magazine. She died in 1951, at the age of 85, in Laguna Beach, California.

Logo of K. M. Yates & Company since 1903

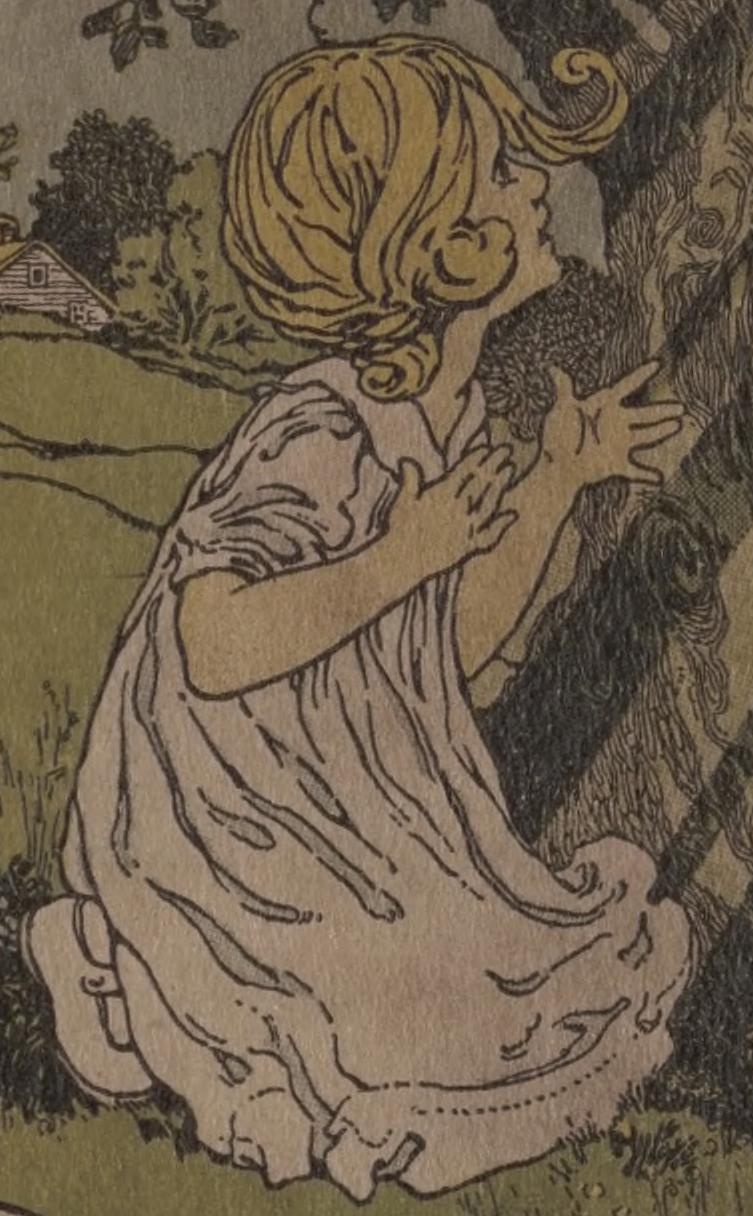
Marjorie, the titular character of Yates's popular Marjorie and the Dream series of children's books

Cheery and the Chum (1908) front cover

== Publications ==
Yates wrote allegorical stories explaining Christian Science principles to young readers, though Yates also emphasized these stories "are not written primarily for children in years; but are for the little girl or boy within, who never has grown up, and never will grow up." Mary Baker Eddy recommended Yates's book On the Way There to her readers in 1904. She was a member of the National League of American Pen Women and the Authors League of America.

=== Books ===
- What the Pine Tree Heard (1903)
- On the Way There (1904)—part of the Marjorie and the Dream series
- The Grey Story Book (1904)
- Through the Woods (1906)—part of the Marjorie and the Dream series
- At the Door (1906)—part of the Marjorie and the Dream series
- By the Wayside (1908, also known as By the Roadside)—part of the Marjorie and the Dream series
- Cheery and the Chum (1908, illustrated by Clara Powers Wilson)
- Diary of One Month in Honolulu (1910)
- Along the Trail (1912)—part of the Marjorie and the Dream series
- "Chet" (1912)
- Any Time (1913)
- A Tale From the Rainbow Land (1914)
- The Questions of my Friend (1915)
- Up the Sunbeams (1916)—part of the Marjorie and the Dream series
- On the Hill-top (1919)—part of the Portal:Marjorie and the Dream series
- In the Valley (1922)—part of the Marjorie and the Dream series
- Kat and Copy-Cat (1929, as E. E. Steven)
- The Feather Cloak (1936)

=== Short stories and essays ===
- "Sweet Pea Blossoms" (1902)
- "Sallie's Red Cheek" (1902)
- "What About the Water?" and "Old Waikiki" (1913)
- "The Lily-Bud Clubs' Glorious Fourth" (1915)
- "In Aloha Land: Intimate Notes on Hawaii" (1916, as Katherine P. Mayhew)
- "From Cell to Sunlight" (1921)
- "Under the Hau Tree" (1925, Weird Tales, reprinted in 1965 in Magazine of Horror)
