= New Prussia, Ontario =

New Prussia
- Unincorporated rural community
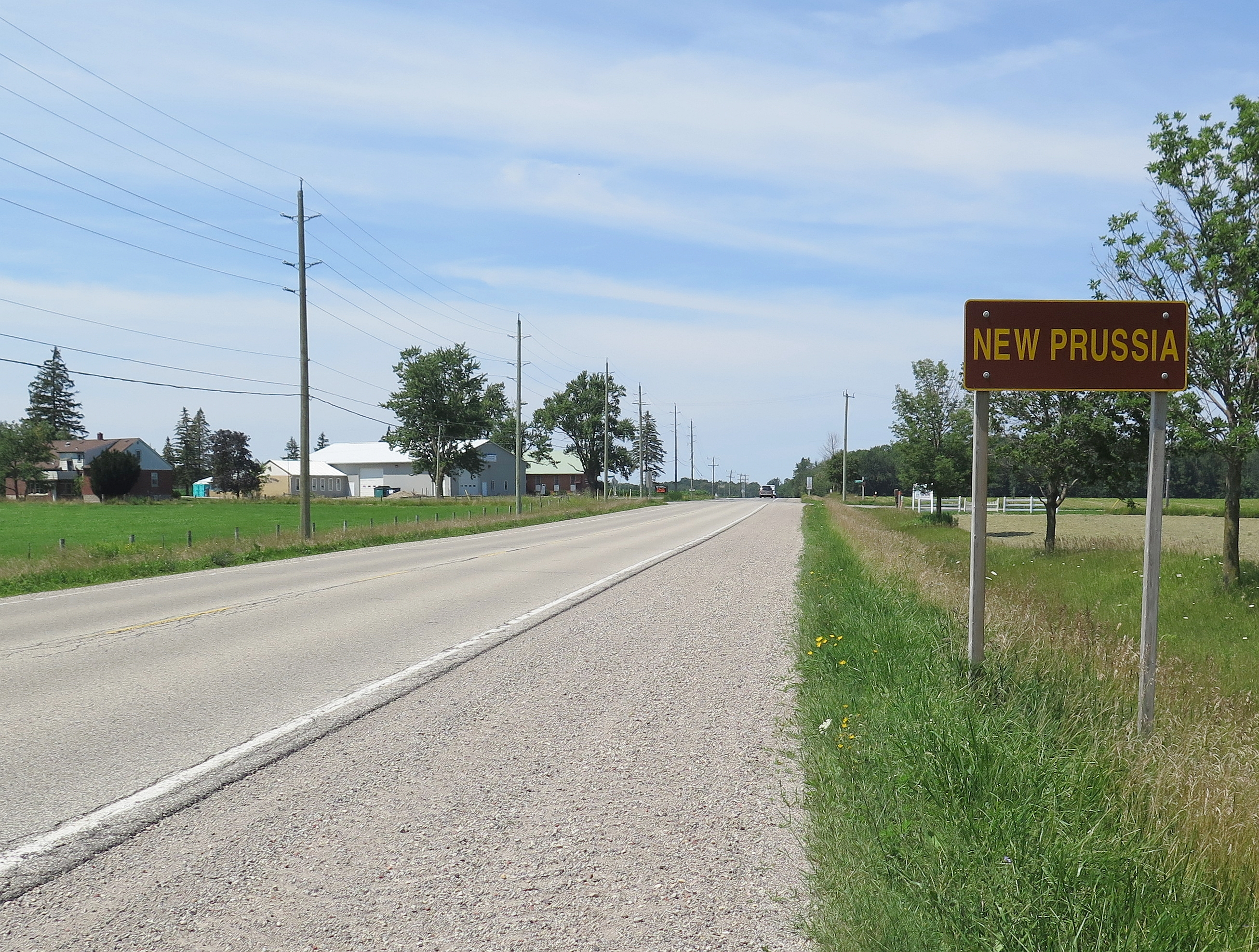

- Location within Regional Municipality of Waterloo Location within Southern Ontario
- Coordinates: 43°27′13″N 80°45′25″W
- Country: Canada
- Province: Ontario
- Region: Waterloo
- Township: Wilmot
- Time zone: UTC-5 (Eastern (EST))
  - Summer (DST): UTC-4 (EDT)
- Forward sortation area: N0B
- Area codes: 519 and 226
- GNBC Code: FEAOH

New Prussia is an unincorporated rural community in the township of Wilmot, Region of Waterloo, Ontario, Canada.

The Nith River flows a short distance east of the settlement.

New Prussia prospered during the mid-1800s, though little remains today of the former settlement.

== History ==
New Prussia was settled by Roman Catholic immigrants from the Rhine Province of Prussia. Early Catholic church services were held by itinerant Jesuits.

A school was erected in 1859 and named "SS#18, New Prussia School". An addition was added in 1952. The school closed in 1966, and was converted into a commercial property. The extant school building has been described as "one of the last physical remnants of the settlement" of New Prussia.

In 1863, the Guenther House was built, and has remained one of the longest continually run century farms in the area. The house is listed on the Wilmot Township Heritage Register.

== Decline ==
The population of New Prussia declined during the late 1800s when many German immigrants in Waterloo County moved west to Bruce County to purchase inexpensive Crown land. This westward movement of German immigrants was called "Saugeen fever", after the Saugeen River which flows through Bruce County.

The Wellesley Alliance Church is today located in New Prussia.

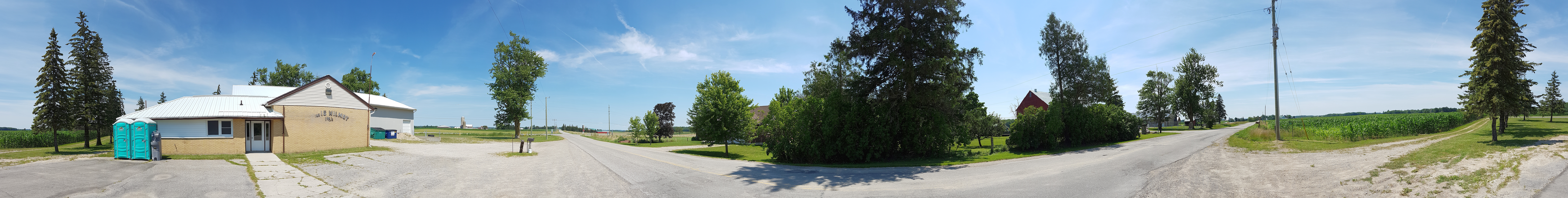
New Prussia in 2017

== See also ==
- List of unincorporated communities in Ontario
