= East Zorra-Tavistock =

- Township (lower-tier)
- Township of East Zorra-Tavistock
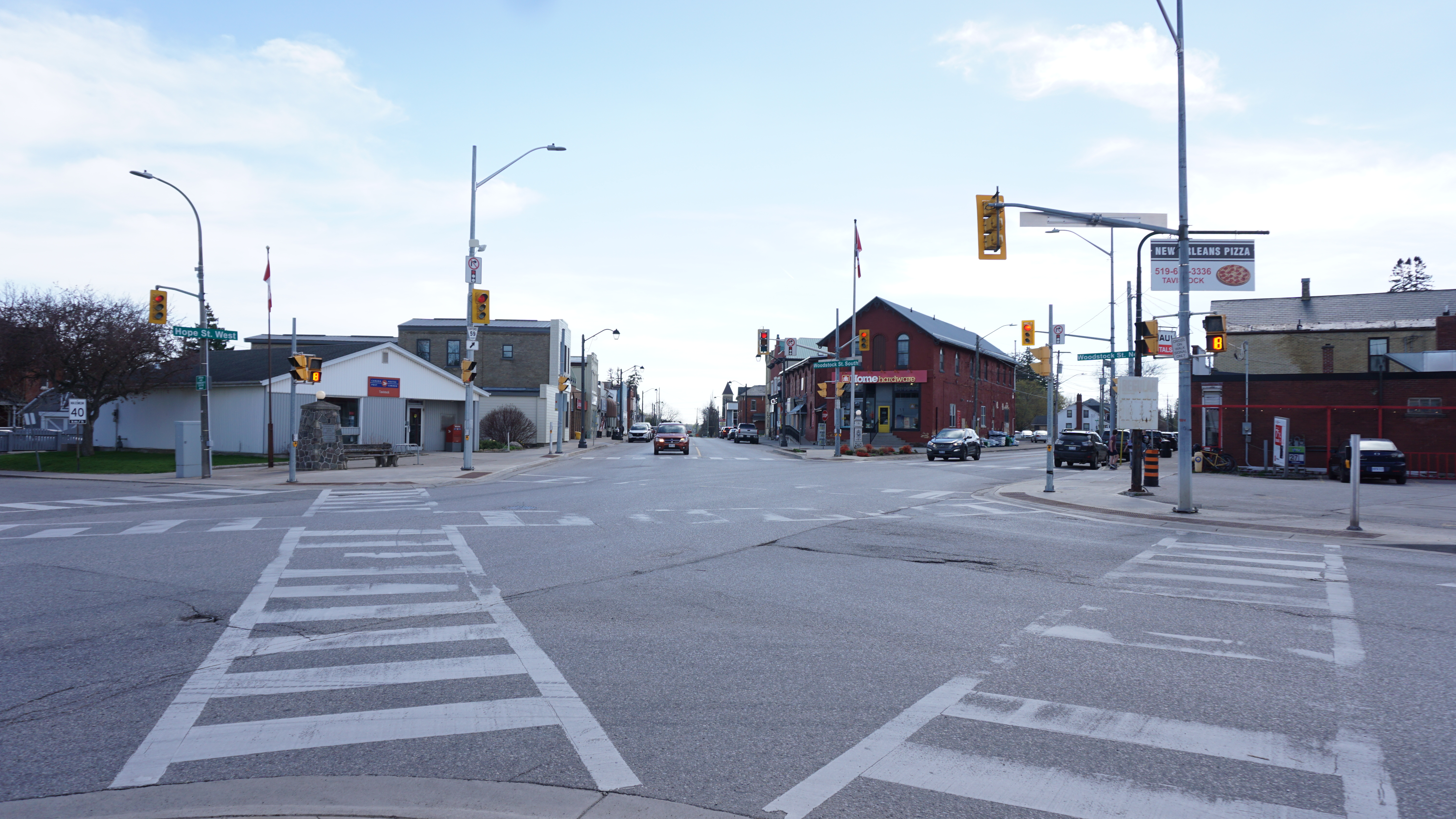
- Downtown Tavistock

- Location within Southern Ontario
- Coordinates: 43°14′N 80°47′W
- Country: Canada
- Province: Ontario
- County: Oxford
- Formed: 1 January 1975

Government
  - Mayor: Philip Schaefer
  - Federal riding: Oxford
  - Prov. riding: Oxford

Area
  - Land: 242.30 km^{2} (93.55 sq mi)

Population (2016)
  - Total: 7,129
  - Density: 29.4/km^{2} (76/sq mi)
- Time zone: UTC-5 (Eastern Standard Time (EST))
  - Summer (DST): UTC-4 (Eastern Daylight Time (EDT))
- Postal Code FSA: N0J
- Area codes: 519, 226, 548
- Website: www.ezt.ca

East Zorra-Tavistock is a township in southwestern Ontario, Canada, formed on 1 January 1975 through the amalgamation of the Township of East Zorra and the Village of Tavistock. It is part of Oxford County. The township had a population of 7,129 in the Canada 2016 Census.

== Communities ==
The township includes the population centres of Braemar, Cassel, East Zorra, Hickson, Huntingford, Innerkip, Perry Mine, Perrys Lane, Strathallan, Tavistock, Tollgate, Willow Lake, and Woodstock Airport. It also includes a portion of the hamlet of Punkeydoodles Corners, which straddles the municipal boundaries of East Zorra – Tavistock, Wilmot, and Perth East.

=== Braemar ===
By 1869, Braemar was a village with a population of 75 in the Township of East Zorra, County Oxford. The average price of land was $25.

=== Hickson ===
Hickson is located at the intersection of Highway 59 and County Road 8, approximately 13 kilometres (8.1 mi) north of Woodstock and 10 kilometres (6.2 mi) south of Tavistock.

Hickson was founded in 1876 when the town of Strathallen was bypassed by the new Port Dover and Lake Huron Railway, which went in east of the anticipated location. A new village was created at the whistle-stop, and Strathallan slowly faded away as community members relocated, along with a few houses moved by the milk factory. The new village was named after Sir Joseph Hickson, the general manager of the Grand Trunk Railway, who never saw the village in his lifetime. Curiously, the Hickson Centennial was celebrated erroneously in 1978 on unreliable information.

In 1932, amid the Great Depression, the Canadian National Railways (CN, the successor to the Grand Trunk) ended rail service and infrastructure maintenance on the line between Hickson and Tavistock Junction. This made Hickson the northern terminus of the line, which became known as the Hickson Subdivision. By the mid-1960s, CN had successfully applied to abandon the line to Hickson as well. The right of way from Woodstock to Hickson more recently has been used for the Hickson Trail.

Hickson has recently added a 4th street (2014) in addition to Highway 59, which is also known as Harwood Street: Lovey's Street (County Road 8), John Street, King Crescent & Borden Court. Hickson is home to Hickson Central Public School (elementary), a public park, the East-Zorra Tavistock township hall and volunteer fire department, a post office, and several small businesses.

=== Huntingford ===
Huntingford is on Hwy 59, between Oxford Road 33 and Braemar Sideroad.

=== Innerkip ===
Innerkip

The village of Innerkip is located approximately 10 kilometres North-East of Woodstock. Innerkip is home to Innerkip Central Public School (elementary), Woodstock Trinity Private School, the Innerkip Highlands Golf Course, a public park, a community centre and library, a volunteer fire department, a post office, and several small businesses.

Innerkip Quarry, a recreational-nature facility is located near the community. From 1928 until its flooding in 1937, Innerkip Quarry produced gravel for railway beds. It was purchased in 1957 and since then has been used as a camp ground and trailer park. It is also used for SCUBA diving and swimming. The quarry is known for diving although it has only a maximum depth of 30 feet, and the only access is by shore. There are submerged cars, boats and planes for divers to use. Ice diving is popular at the quarry in the winter time. Many companies in Southern Ontario use the quarry for training. There is no diveshop on site, but there is a tank fill station.

=== Tavistock ===
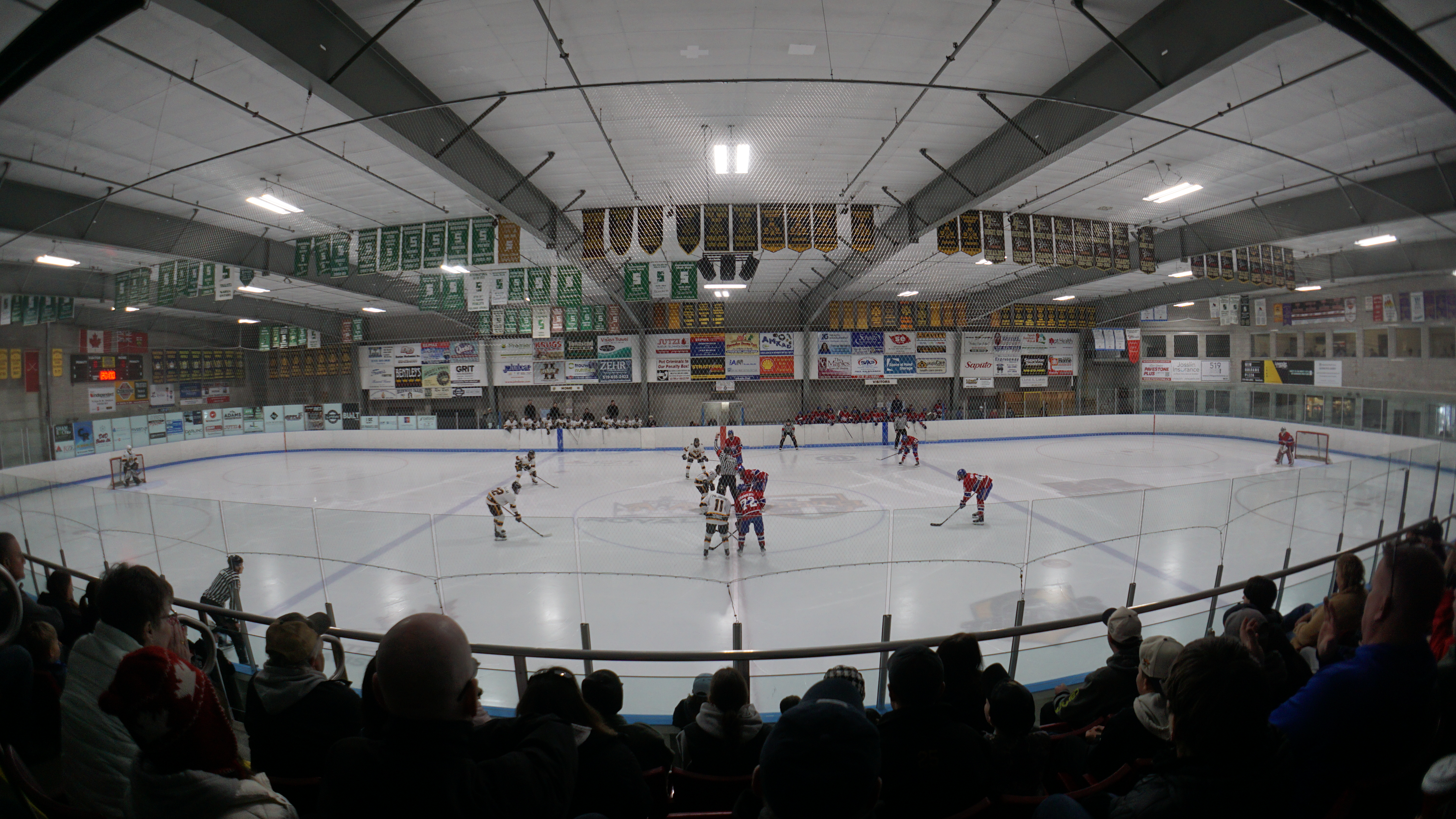
The Tavistock & District Recreation Centre

Tavistock is located 15 kilometers southeast of Stratford and five kilometers south of Shakespeare on County Road 59. The area of the village is 2.25 km^{2}

Tavistock is home to the Tavistock Braves, a junior hockey team that plays in the Provincial Junior Hockey League, and the Tavistock Royals, a senior hockey team that plays in the Western Ontario Athletic Association Senior Hockey League.

Tavistock has hosted the World Crokinole Championship (WCC) tournament annually on the first Saturday of June since 1999. Tavistock was chosen as the host village because it was closest to the Sebastopol, Ontario home of Eckhardt Wettlaufer, the maker of the earliest known board.

== Government ==
The township is governed by a Mayor (Don McKay acclaimed at November 2006 election, a Deputy Mayor (Maureen Ralph), and 5 Councillors over three geographic wards:

- Ward 1 (Tavistock village): 2 councillors elected
- Ward 2 (northern areas of township except Tavistock village): 1 councillor elected
- Ward 3 (southern areas of township, including Innerkip): 2 councillors elected

== Demographics ==
In the 2021 Census of Population conducted by Statistics Canada, East Zorra-Tavistock had a population of 7,841 living in 2,976 of its 3,055 total private dwellings, a change of 10.2% from its 2016 population of 7,113. With a land area of 241.96 km^{2} (93.42 sq mi), it had a population density of 32.4/km^{2} (83.9/sq mi) in 2021.

Population trend:

- Population in 2016: 7,129
- Population in 2011: 6,836
- Population in 2006: 7,350 (or 7,008 when adjusted to 2011 boundaries)
- Population in 2001: 7,238
- Population in 1996: 7,348 (or 7,278 when adjusted to 2001 boundaries)
- Population in 1991: 7,251

== Education ==
Public education in the township is managed by the Thames Valley District School Board, which has the following schools in East Zorra - Tavistock. All are elementary schools (up to grade 8), after which students are bused to schools in Woodstock.

- Hickson Central Public School
- Innerkip Central Public School
- Tavistock Public School

=== Historical schools ===
- Innerkip Central Public School - 180 Coleman St, Innerkip. The first school which was originally built in 1930 has since been replaced with a more modern facility.
- Tollgate Central Public School - 744993 Oxford Road 17. It was originally called S.S. No. 4 and was built on this site in 1848. A more modern facility was built in 1954.

== Libraries ==
Oxford County Library operates two branches within East Zorra-Tavistock: in Innerkip at 695566 Oxford Road 5 (17th line), and in Tavistock at 40 Woodstock Street South.

== Natural areas and parks ==
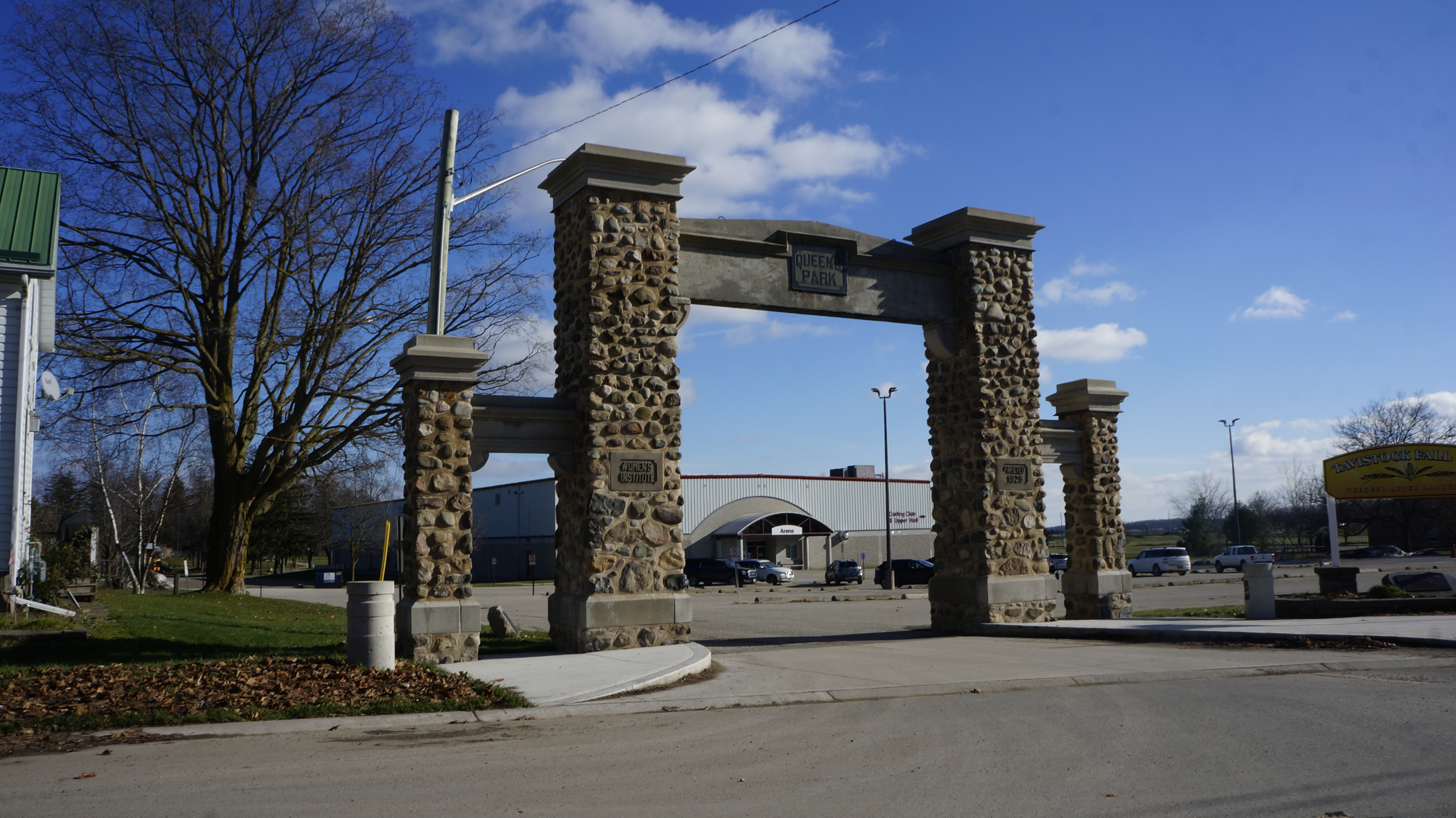
Queen's Park Gate

=== Innerkip Lions Park ===
104 blandford st or 695566 county road 5 (17th line), Innerkip ON. 6.9 ha (17 acres).

=== Optimist Club of Tavistock Park ===
250 Oxford Road 59, Tavistock. 4.5 ha (11 acres)

=== Tavistock Queen's Park ===
Maria St. Established in 1928. The stone gates were funded by the local Women's Institute. 20.5 ha (50 acres) of parkland and facilities.

=== W. Leslie Dickson Arboretum ===
715570 Oxford Road 4 is dedicated to the memory of W.L. Dickson. This 15 acre memorium is a product of a group called "The Men of the Trees". An excess of 150 labeled native trees and shrubs is provided.

== Plaques and monuments ==
=== Canada's Birthday ===
986044 Perth-Oxford Rd. Plaque - located at Punkeydoodle's Corners. a 6-sided concrete pillar with the inscription "Canada's Birthday 1982". It commemorates the Rt. Honourable Joe Clark's visit to the community on this day.

=== David Stock, Caister's Tavern ===
597112 Oxford Road 59, Tavistock. Caister's Tavern c. 1845–1854. Caleb Caister came from England to Oxford County in 1833. In 1836, he settled on this site, cleared farmland and built a one-storey log dwelling. This dwelling was his family home but also served as an inn and tavern. Until 1848, when what is now Tavistock was established, Caister's home was the only public accommodation in north-central Oxford County for pioneers moving along the Huron Road and thence southerly into the Zorra settlement. By the 1840s, Caister held an official municipal licence, and a survey map of the time shows that his log dwelling was known in this locality as Caister's Tavern.

=== Founder of Tavistock ===
22 Woodstock St. S, Tavistock. A stone cairn erected 1930 in memory of Captain Henry Eckstein, founder of Tavistock, A.D. 1848. Rededicated 1948. Rebuilt and rededicated in 1998.

=== A Tribute to Farm Women ===
OMAFRA site - Outdoor Farm show. This monument represents the role of farm women in the foundation and progress of Canadian Agriculture. Women from across the nation brought stones from their farms to help build this structure, erected throughout the three days of Canada's Outdoor Farm Show, September 2000. Presented by Farm Credit Corporation, Canada's Outdoor Farm Show, Ontario Farm Women's Network.

=== The Glass Swan ===
An historic house from Tavistock's earliest days, at 52 Woodstock St. S. There is a plaque marking its significance.

== See also ==
- List of townships in Ontario
