= Canada's Outdoor Farm Show =

Annual farm show in Ontario, Canada

Canada's Outdoor Farm Show (COFS) is an annual outdoor agricultural trade show held each September near Woodstock, Ontario, Canada. The show is owned and operated by Glacier FarmMedia, the agricultural media division of Glacier Media.

== History ==
Canada's Outdoor Farm Show was founded by Ginty Jocius in 1993, beginning as a small event at a site just south of Highway 401 near Burford, Ontario, with only a few hundred exhibitors. In 1996 the show relocated to its current site near Woodstock, Ontario.

Over the following decades the show grew significantly. By its 20th edition in 2013, it was welcoming over 40,000 visitors and more than 700 exhibitors annually, and had developed a reputation as both a trade show and an outdoor proving ground for new agricultural equipment and crop genetics.

== Format and features ==
The show runs for three days each September on a 100-acre site at the Glacier FarmMedia Discovery Farm near Woodstock. Features include live equipment demonstrations, livestock displays, crop plots, and an innovations program showcasing new agricultural technologies. Each year the show attracts over 36,000 visitors and more than 600 exhibitors from across Canada and beyond.

Recent editions have highlighted emerging agricultural technologies, including drone spraying and seeding equipment, autonomous farm robots, and new disc harrows.
