= Wilmot, Ontario =

Wilmot
- Township (lower-tier)
- Township of Wilmot
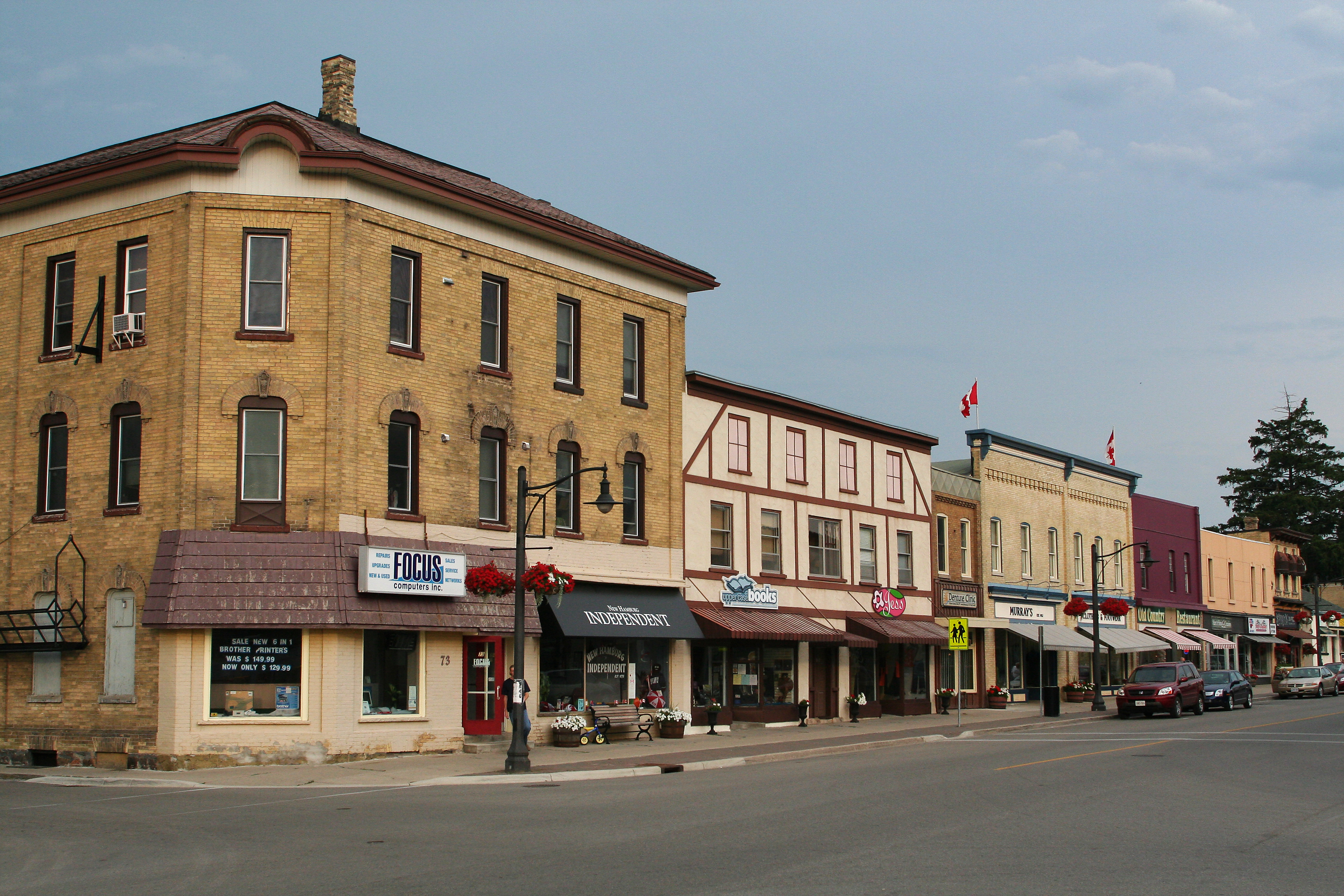
- Peel Street in New Hamburg
- Motto: Building a Sure Foundation
- Location within Regional Municipality of Waterloo Location within Southern Ontario
- Coordinates: 43°24′N 80°39′W
- Country: Canada
- Province: Ontario
- Region: Waterloo
- Settled: 1822
- Incorporated: 1850

Government
  - Mayor: Natasha Salonen
  - Councillors: List: Lillianne Dunstall; Steven Martin; Harvir Sidhu; Kris Wilkinson; Stewart Cressman
  - Federal riding: Kitchener—Conestoga
  - Prov. riding: Kitchener—Conestoga

Area
  - Land: 263.78 km^{2} (101.85 sq mi)
- Elevation: 370 m (1,210 ft)

Population (2016)
  - Total: 20,545
  - Density: 77.9/km^{2} (202/sq mi)
- Time zone: UTC-5 (EST)
  - Summer (DST): UTC-4 (EDT)
- Postal Code: N3A
- Area codes: 519, 226, 548
- Website: www.wilmot.ca

The Township of Wilmot is a rural township in the Regional Municipality of Waterloo in southwestern Ontario, Canada.

== History ==
=== Archaic and Woodland periods ===
The earliest concrete evidence of human activity within Wilmot dates to around 8,300 years ago, in the Early Archaic period, though some artifacts are thought to be as old as 13,000 years. Early Archaic evidence is in the form of artifacts from the Hunsberger Creek site (AiHd-83). This site on the upper part of Hunsberger Creek saw occupation during the Early and Middle Archaic periods, as well as the Middle and possibly Late Woodland periods. In one interpretation of the site, it represents a place of significant repeated short-term occupation; namely, a "headwater camp" where mobile hunter-gatherers stopped near the uppermost part of a waterway before possibly returning down the waterway or migrating to another drainage system.

Archaeological investigation in Wilmot in the 1980s uncovered the largest known historic remains of a longhouse in North America. Originally 60 metres (200 ft) in length, it was extended to reach a final length of 123.75 metres (406.0 ft) and was home to up to 120 people. Along with three smaller longhouses, it formed the core of a village which may have had up to 600 inhabitants at its peak. Dated to between 1400 and 1450 CE (falling within the Late Woodland period), it is associated with the Neutral people, an Iroquoian society.

=== Arrival of Europeans ===
Wilmot Township was a Crown Reserve by 1791. After a survey in 1824, Mennonites from Waterloo Township and Amish from Europe began to settle here. The first settlement area was prepared by Christian Nafziger, an Amish Mennonite from Pennsylvania, but originally from Germany. After 1828, Roman Catholics and Lutherans from Alsace and Germany, Anglicans from Britain and others arrived and began to develop the area and construct buildings and roads. Most settlers were farmers. Much of the area was settled by those of German heritage, but also included some of Scottish, English, and Irish origins; the latter groups owned land primarily in the southern third of the township.

Likely to have been the first settler in what has been called Hamburgh or New Hamburg since about 1840, millwright Josiah Cushman arrived from Germany in the early 1830s. He dammed Smith's Creek and built a sawmill that helped attract others. William Scott, (Lord Campfield in Scotland), now considered to be the founder of New Hamburg, arrived in 1838, after Cushman's death. He renamed Smith's Creek the Nith River, built a new dam and constructed a new lumber sawmill. The mill continued to plane lumber until 1902 when it burned down. The replacement building was a feed mill, later known as B-W Feed and Seed; that entity still exists, now as a sales outlet for feed.

Arriving in Wilmot in 1838, were John Meyer, Peter Wilker, Jacob Stoebler, Deobold Segler, and John Marteyne. In 1840, the township became part of the District of Wellington and received the right to elect officials and to tax land owners. The first Township council was elected in January 1850.

At the 1841 population count there were 2,200 people in the township, most of whom were self-described as "Germans". The post office opened in 1844.

Records from 1846 indicate that the township consisted of 51,463 acres of which 15,310 were being cultivated. Existing villages included Hamburg and Haysville, and there were two grist mills and nine sawmills on the Nith River (previously called Smith's Creek).

By 1864, the township included a Lutheran church, a tannery, one store, two hotels, two wagon makers, shoe and boot makers, as well as carpenters and mechanics. The school had about 60 students. The settlement was receiving mail daily. There were also two Roman Catholic Separate Schools in the township of Wilmot in 1864.

Some of the original settlements have Heritage signs indicating their location in the 1800s: Holland Mills, Josephsburg, New Prussia, Pinehill, Punkeydoodle's Corner, Rosebank, Victoriaburg, and Waldau.

== Communities ==
The township comprises the communities of Baden, Berlett's Corners, Foxboro Green, Haysville, Josephburg, Luxemburg, Mannheim, New Dundee, New Hamburg, New Prussia, Petersburg, Phillipsburg, St. Agatha, Schindelsteddle and Wilmot Centre, as well as most of Punkeydoodles Corners, a crossroads which straddles the municipal boundaries of Wilmot, East Zorra – Tavistock and Perth East.

St. Agatha was initially called Wilmot and then it was renamed probably after the local Catholic church that had been built in the 1830s. Most early settlers to this area were German: Amish Mennonites, Lutherans, and Roman Catholics. The latter were the majority, making St. Agatha the centre of Catholic community in the Township. By 1834, there were two public log schools and a Catholic log school. More modern school buildings were erected about 20 years later. The Amish Mennonites built their meeting house in 1885.

Some of the settlers moved on to other areas so the community remained small. In 1869, the population was only and by 1890 it had dropped to 200. By 1906, there was a hotel, a blacksmith shop, some stores and various tradesmen.

== Demographics ==
Wilmot, Ontario historical populations
Year	Pop.	±%
1991	13,107	—
1996	13,831	+5.5%
2001	14,866	+7.5%
2006	17,097	+15.0%
2011	19,223	+12.4%
2016	20,545	+6.9%

In the 2021 Census of Population conducted by Statistics Canada, Wilmot had a population of 21,429 living in 7,891 of its 8,035 total private dwellings, a change of 4.3% from its 2016 population of 20,545. With a land area of 263.81 km^{2} (101.86 sq mi), it had a population density of 81.2/km^{2} (210.4/sq mi) in 2021.

10 largest self-identified ethnic groups:
Ethnic origin	Population	Percent
German	8,305	40.9
Canadian	5,785	28.5
English	5,525	27.2
Scottish	4,500	22.2
Irish	3,830	18.9
French	1,980	10.0
Dutch	1,570	7.7
Polish	1,005	5.0
Italian	615	3.0
Ukrainian	455	2.2
Source: StatCan, 2016 (includes multiple responses)

Canada census – Wilmot, Ontario community profile

	2016	2011
Population	20,545 (+6.9% from 2011)	19,223 (+12.4% from 2006)
Land area	263.78 km^{2} (101.85 sq mi)	263.72 km^{2} (101.82 sq mi)
Population density	77.9/km^{2} (202/sq mi)	72.9/km^{2} (189/sq mi)
Median age	41.4 (M: 40.9, F: 41.8)	40.4 (M: 40.1, F: 40.8)
Private dwellings	7,612 (total)	7,158 (total)
Median household income	$96,154

References: 2016 2011

At the time of the 2016 Canadian Census, 79.2% of the population lived in single detached houses, higher than the 55.7% in the Region of Waterloo overall, as well as the 48.6% in nearby Kitchener. The single largest self-reported ethnicity was German (40.9%); 3.7% also reported knowledge of the German language and 3.1% reported it as a mother tongue. The second-largest self-identified ethnic origin was Canadian (28.5%), followed by English (27.2%), Scottish (22.2%), and Irish (18.9%). 11.7% of people identified themselves as Eastern European, of which the largest ethnic group was Polish (5.0%). 7.8% of people identified themselves as Southern European, of which the largest ethnic group was Italian (3.0%). 2.6% of people identified themselves as Indigenous (1.9% as First Nations and 0.8% as Métis).

== Transportation ==
Wilmot is bisected by both a mainline railway (the CN Guelph Subdivision) and a provincial highway (dual-designated as Highway 7 and Highway 8 through the township), which both run east–west. The railway passes through the cores of both Baden and New Hamburg, while the highway bypasses the town centres to the south.

Passenger trains on Via Rail's Québec City–Windsor Corridor pass through Wilmot daily, but run as expresses through the township and do not stop. The nearest passenger train stations are Stratford to the west and Kitchener to the east. GO Train service on the Kitchener line is also available at Kitchener station, which is its western terminus. A GO train station and storage and maintenance yard were planned to be located near Baden, but these plans were deferred following the opening of a GO train depot on Shirley Avenue in Kitchener instead.

As of 2021, Wilmot is served by a single bus route, Grand River Transit's Route 77 Wilmot. It operates on a 12-hour weekday schedule and uses "flex stops" to provide more convenient service to riders in certain areas. The route connects New Hamburg, Baden, and Petersburg to the Boardwalk bus terminal on the west end of Kitchener-Waterloo. After an initial pilot in 2016–17 which was funded by a provincial community transportation grant, the route was made a permanent part of the Grand River Transit system.

== Athletics ==
- Wilmot Aquatic Aces Swim Club
- New Hamburg Firebirds (Hockey)
- New Hamburg Huskies (Hockey)
- Wilmot Warthogs (Rugby)

== See also ==
- List of townships in Ontario
- List of municipalities in Ontario
