= Blandford-Blenheim =

Township in Ontario, Canada

- Township (lower-tier)
- Township of Blandford-Blenheim
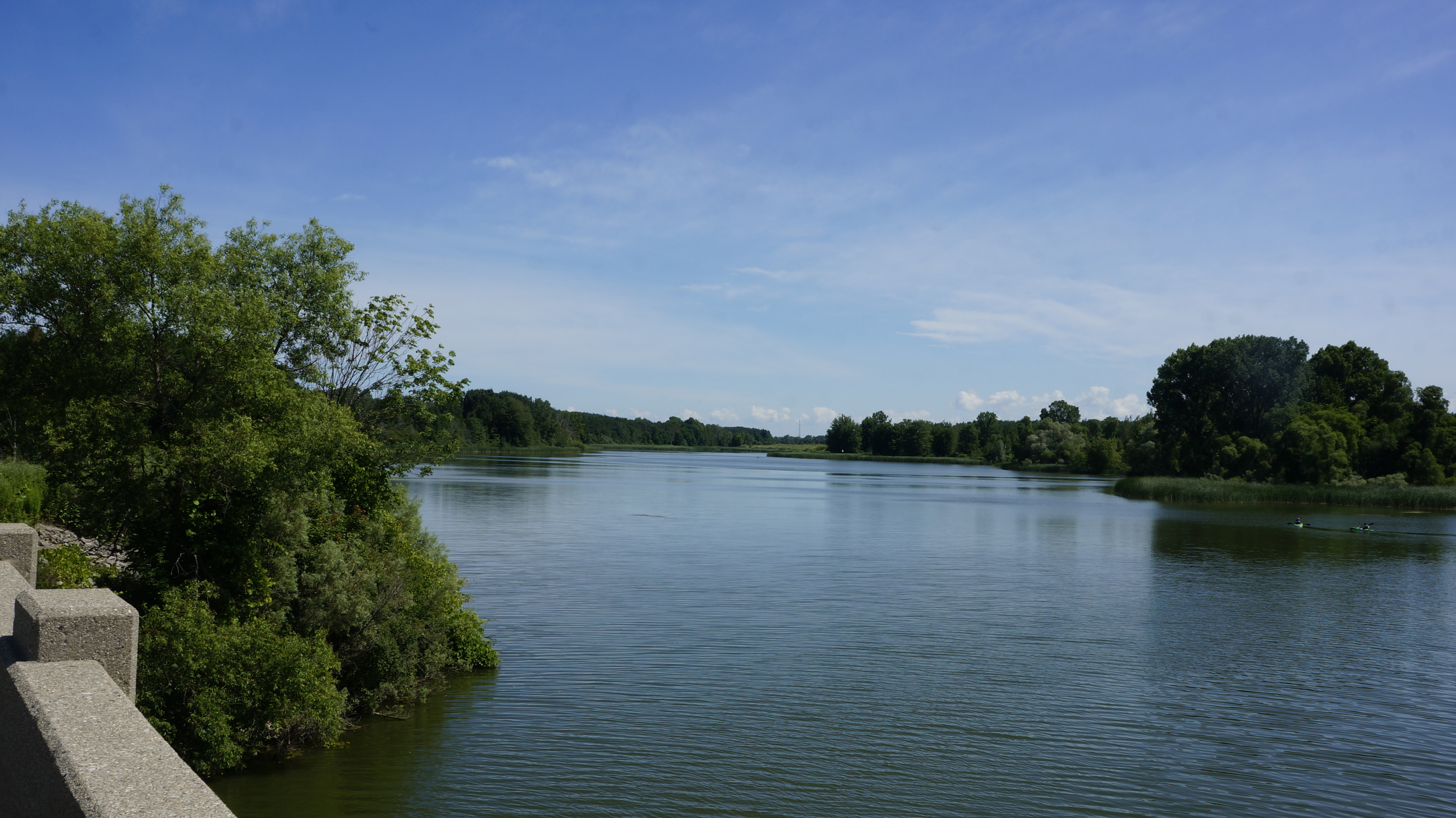
- The Thames River running through Blandford-Blenheim
- Motto: Working Together
- Location within Southern Ontario
- Coordinates: 43°14′N 80°36′W
- Country: Canada
- Province: Ontario
- County: Oxford
- Formed: 1975

Government
  - Mayor: Mark Peterson
  - Federal riding: Oxford
  - Prov. riding: Oxford

Area
  - Land: 382.33 km^{2} (147.62 sq mi)

Population (2016)
  - Total: 7,399
  - Density: 19.4/km^{2} (50/sq mi)
- Time zone: UTC-5 (Eastern Standard Time (EST))
  - Summer (DST): UTC-4 (Eastern Daylight Time (EDT))
- Postal Code: N0J
- Area codes: 519, 226, 548
- Website: www.twp.bla-ble.on.ca

Blandford-Blenheim is a township in the Canadian province of Ontario, located in Oxford County. The township had a population of 7,359 in the Canada 2011 Census.

Its government consists of a mayor and four councillors. There are no geographic ward divisions for municipal elections; candidates for councillor campaign in the entire township and the four candidates who receive the most votes are declared elected.

The township was amalgamated in 1975 from two historic county townships, Blandford and Blenheim.

== Populated places ==
Numerous villages and hamlets are within the town of Blandford-Blenheim, including:

- Former Blandford Township: Blandford, Blandford Station (partially), Bright (partially), Chesterfield (partially), Creditville (partially), Eastwood (partially), Ratho.
- Former Blenheim Township: Blandford Station (partially), Blink Bonnie, Bright (partially), Canning, Chesterfield (partially), Drumbo, Etonia, Forest Estates, Gobles, Park Haven, Perry's Corners, Plattsville, Princeton, Richwood, Showers Corners, Washington, Windfall, Wolverton.

== Demographics ==
In the 2021 Census of Population conducted by Statistics Canada, Blandford-Blenheim had a population of 7,565 living in 2,779 of its 2,857 total private dwellings, a change of 2.2% from its 2016 population of 7,399. With a land area of 382.03 km^{2} (147.50 sq mi), it had a population density of 19.8/km^{2} (51.3/sq mi) in 2021.

Population trend:

- Population in 2016: 7399
- Population in 2011: 7359
- Population in 2006: 7149
- Population in 2001: 7630 (or 7442 when adjusted to 2006 boundaries)
- Population in 1996: 7455 (or 7409 when adjusted to 2001 boundaries)
- Population in 1991: 7266

== Attractions and cultural resources ==
=== Drumbo Public Library ===
On June 10, 2005 the Oxford County Library Board closed the Drumbo branch. When letters of appeal and a public meeting organized by Carl McLean failed to reverse this decision, the Access Committee Group – Robbie Savage, Valerie Johnston and Paul Jacobson – was formed to maintain a community library with internet access. A new entity, the Drumbo Opportunity Centre, was born.

This group applied for charitable status, approached the County of Oxford for use of the library building and applied to the Community Access Program. Charitable status was granted in June 2006 and a lease with the County (for rent and connectivity) was signed in May 2006. DOC ceased operations at the end of December 2013 and returned the building to the control of the county.

=== Plattsville Public Library ===
c/o Plattsville Public School, 112 Mill St. E, Plattsville.

=== Princeton Museum and Library ===
35 Main St S, Princeton. A branch of the Oxford County Library. Plaque - built in 1998 from stone from local farms, the Princeton War Memorial commemorates local war veterans who died in World War I and II.

=== Richwood Community Centre ===
767415 Twp Rd 5, Blenheim. Originally a two-room schoolhouse, the former S.S. No 14 was operated as a school from 1857 to 1963. The building is now owned by the Municipality of Blandford-Blenheim and is used as a community centre.

=== Attractions ===
Blenheim Springs Trout Farm, Walter's Dinner Theatre.

== Natural areas and parks ==
=== Chesney Wilderness ===
Con 9 lot 5 Blandford. This 40.5 ha (100 acres) of land was the first reforestation plot in the county in 1944. Similar tracts were established in Drumbo, Centreville, Innerkip, Embro and Lakeside.

=== Plattsville Memorial Community Arena and Park ===
68 Mill St E, Plattsville. Park offers 1 ball diamond with field lights, arena. There is also a pavilion. The "To Our Heroes" Memorial Gate was set up in August 1921 in honour of the men and women who served in World War I. Plattsville Cenotaph is located on the property.

=== Princeton Memorial Park ===
35 Main St. S, Princeton. A cairn and flagpole in honour of Mac McAnsh, a gentleman who operated the hardware in Princeton for many years, is located in front of the Centennial Building.

== History ==
The geographical area which is now Blandford-Blenheim was populated with Neutral/Attawandaron longhouse villages for many centuries but was abandoned to First Nations nomadic peoples by the 1650s as a result of warfare with Haudenosaunee and epidemics resulting from European contact. A century later the area was being used for hunting grounds primarily by the Mississaugas First Nation, and it was from them that the land was acquired by the Crown through two treaties, the first signed in 1784, and the second in 1792.

The names of Blandford and Blenheim were given in the 1790s as part of Gov. Simcoe's program to make the new colony of Upper Canada a "mirror of Britain", using place names familiar from England. Blandford was named for Blandford and Blenheim for Blenheim Palace, both nods to the Duke of Marlborough who was also Marquess of Blandford. Upon Gov. Simcoe's arrival in the province in 1792, his first proclamation, issued while still at Kingston, announced the names and boundaries he had decided upon for county boundaries.

For areas lying to the west of Kingston, Gov. Simcoe decided that the sequence of names for counties along Lake Ontario would be Northumberland, Durham, York and Lincoln, and for counties along Lake Erie, the names became Norfolk, Suffolk, Essex and Kent. (This was the same sequence of county names in place along the eastern seacoast of England, running from the Scottish boundary down to the English Channel.) The proclamation defined the northern boundary of Norfolk County as being the Thames River, but the area which became Blandford and Blenheim was originally designated as being part of the western end of York County for election purposes.

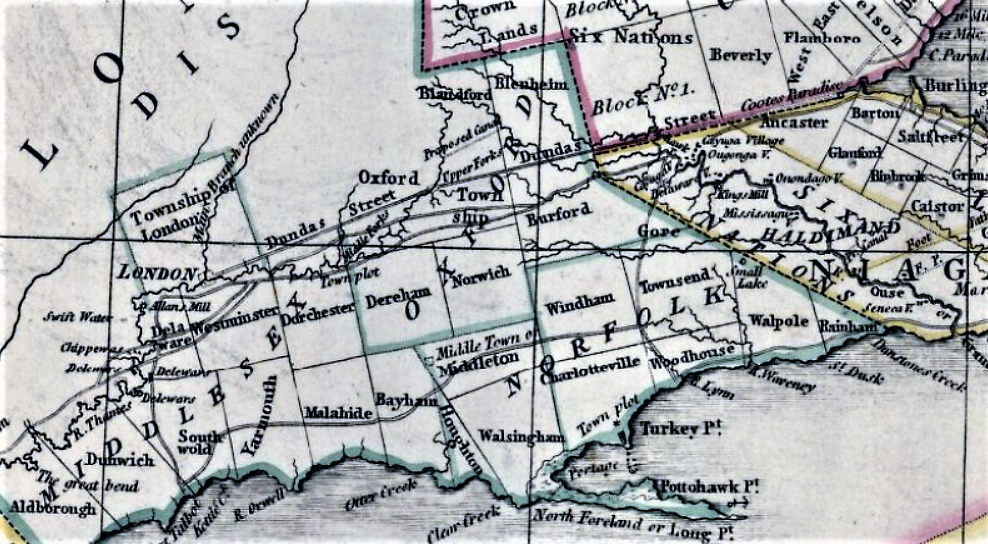
circa 1800 map of townships following creation of Oxford County

Gov. Simcoe with several other government officers, guided by a party of Six Nations warriors, conducted a wilderness tour on foot down and back up the length of the Thames River in February 1793 and decided to assign additional place names to mirror those they knew along the Thames River in England. Middlesex County was the name to be used for the area around a town site reserved at the "lower forks" in the river, to be called London; Dorchester was the name for a town site at the "middle forks"; and the area around the "upper forks" was to be Oxford - the same sequence of names as found along the Thames in England. Just as in Oxfordshire in England, Blandford and Blenheim were names at the northerly end of the county, around Woodstock, adjacent to the towns of Oxford and Burford. When legislation was passed in 1798 in Upper Canada to implement these new divisions by Gov. Simcoe, Norwich and Dereham were separated from Norfolk County and added to the new Oxford County, which included also Burford, Blenheim, Blandford and Oxford townships.

Blenheim Township was opened up to settlement in 1793 when Gov. Simcoe agreed it should be granted to Thomas Watson from New Jersey who promised to bring in settlers and build mills. This was the start of what became the life's work of his nephew Thomas Hornor, who with Watson's son Thomas Jr. and various others were active developing a settlement around Princeton by 1795. Within the course of the next decade, Hornor was appointed a justice of the peace, then as the land registrar for the county, then as the resident commanding officer for the county militia. He carried on as a leading citizen of the county until his death from cholera in 1834.

Blandford Township was held in reserve by the government until a village began to develop along its southern end in the early 1830s, which took the name Woodstock. The official town plot was surveyed in 1834 by the prolific Crown surveyor Charles Rankin.

== Historical events ==
In 1890, a body was found in a Princeton swamp that would lead to the Reginald Birchall murder trial that took place in Woodstock, Ontario. This trial received worldwide media coverage.

== Historical landmarks ==
=== Drumbo Museum ===
42 Centre St, Drumbo. Located in the former Wolverton Railway Station which was relocated to the Drumbo Agricultural Fairgrounds.

=== Wolverton Hall ===
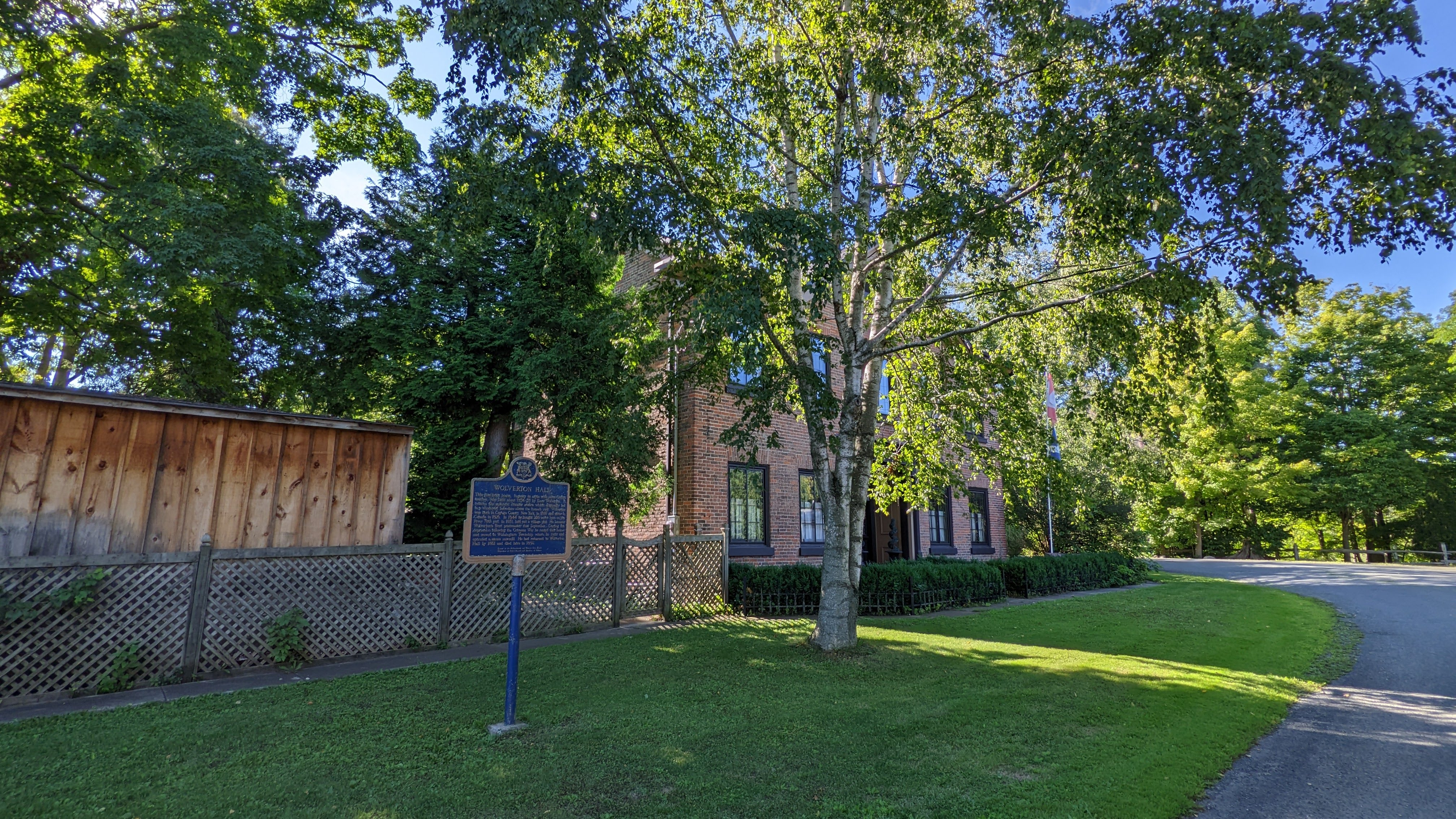

88 Wolverton St., Wolverton. A fine example of Regency styling, with Gothic flourishes. A plaque marks this brick house built about 1854–55 by Enos Wolverton, village founder and first postmaster.

== Plaques and monuments ==
=== Blandford School ===
775903 Blandford Rd. Dedicated to all Schools in the former Township of Blandford.

=== Drumbo Agricultural Society ===
42 Centre St, Drumbo. There are two plaques on the property commemorating 100 years of the Drumbo Fall Fair and 150 years of the Drumbo Fall Fair, respectively.

=== Henry Muma, 1822–1902 ===
12 Wilmot St. N, Drumbo. Land agent and founder of Drumbo post office in 1854; he began a brick works here in 1874 and founded the Muma Block on this corner in 1890. His photograph is in the village agricultural hall.

=== Mudge Hollow ===
Canning. Located on Township Road 3 east of the Canning Road, Canning was originally known as Mudge Hollow.

== Historical churches ==
=== Bright United Church ===
31 John St W, Bright. The original Methodist congregation was established in 1865. There was a need for a new church in 1877, but one was not built until 1892.

=== Chesterfield United Church ===
816661 Oxford Road 22, Bright. The original congregation was Presbyterian. Built in 1854. The Chesterfield centotaph is located in the churchyard.

=== Drumbo Baptist Church ===
20 Pinkham St., Drumbo. Known originally as Second Blenheim Regular Baptist Church, it was built in 1855at Windfall. In 1859, while moving the building to the centre of Drumbo, the roof caved in and a new white framed building was erected for $1000. The new building was located about 50 yards south of the present church building, which was built in 1876. This present building was the first new building to be erected after the fire that destroyed much of the town.

=== Plattsville Evangelical Missionary Church ===
19 Albert St E, Plattsville.

Started in 1956, Plattsville Evangelical Missionary Church began as a Bible study group from the members of Bethel Missionary Church in New Dundee. The congregation was faced with the necessity of expanding their facilities to accommodate their growing congregation.

A group of individuals with a passion for reaching the community of Plattsville approached the local sandpaper factory (now Saint-Gobain). The company had been using a former church building as a storage and warehouse facility. The original building was built in 1885 by a Baptist congregation, but upon their closure in 1937, the building was sold to the sandpaper facility next door.

The church was dedicated as Plattsville United Missionary Church on June 10, 1956. In 1984, an addition was built on, providing additional classrooms, a nursery, and offices. Then in 1996, a new, multi-purpose gymnasium with a full basement was built. The gymnasium is now the main sanctuary for the church.

Plattsville Evangelical Missionary Church is a member of the Evangelical Missionary Church of Canada denomination.

=== Plattsville United Church ===
20 Samuel St., Plattsville. It was a Methodist congregation until 1925 when it became United. Built in 1876. Addition built in 1993, which included a new foyer and elevator.

=== Princeton United Church ===
24 Elgin St E., Princeton. The original Methodist congregation was established in 1870. The current congregation is a result of a union between the Princeton and Etonia churches in 1925. It was built in 1880.

=== Ratho Presbyterian Church ===
905987 Twp Rd 12, Blandford. Built in 1852 by a Scottish community.

=== Richwood United Church ===
767417 Rd 5, Blenheim. Richwood United Church was opened on September 15, 1861, as a Wesleyan Methodist Church on the Paris circuit. It is now part of the Drumbo Charge.

=== Sacred Heart Roman Catholic Church ===
39 Gissing St W, Princeton. The Princeton church, which was built in 1888, was a mission of St. Mary's until 1941 when it became Sacred Heart.

=== St. Paul's Anglican Church ===
4 Elgin St. E., Princeton. Built in 1867.

=== Mennonite Conference Church ===
967244 Oxford-Waterloo Rd. Built in 1901. Used only as a retreat centre.

=== Washington United Church ===
23 Washington Rd N. The original congregation was Methodist. Built in 1860.

=== Willis United Church ===
15 Centre St., Drumbo. Built in 1915. Named after Michael Willis, who was moderator of the Presbyterian Church in 1870.

=== Windfall United Church ===
806484 Oxford Road 29. The first church was a frame building and the congregation was of the United Brethren faith. In 1899 the frame building was torn down and the present brick building erected. It is believed that a $100 bill was placed in the corner stone. Regular services ceased in 1991. A memorial service and an anniversary service are held each year.

== Historical schools ==
=== Drumbo Central Public School ===
32 Wilmot St. S. Drumbo. The school was built in 1946. Plaque - The Drumbo cenotaph is located on the school property.

=== Princeton Central Public School ===
40 Elgin St., Princeton. The school was built in September 1950. Has since been demolished.

== Residents of note ==
- John English, Canadian historian and Member of Parliament
- Babe Siebert, Hockey Hall of Fame inductee, born in Plattsville
- Bill Swan, Canadian children's author born in Bright, ON
- Katherine M. Yates (1865-1951), writer born in Drumbo, ON

== See also ==
- List of townships in Ontario
