= Oxford County, Ontario =

Oxford County
- Regional municipality (upper-tier)
- County of Oxford
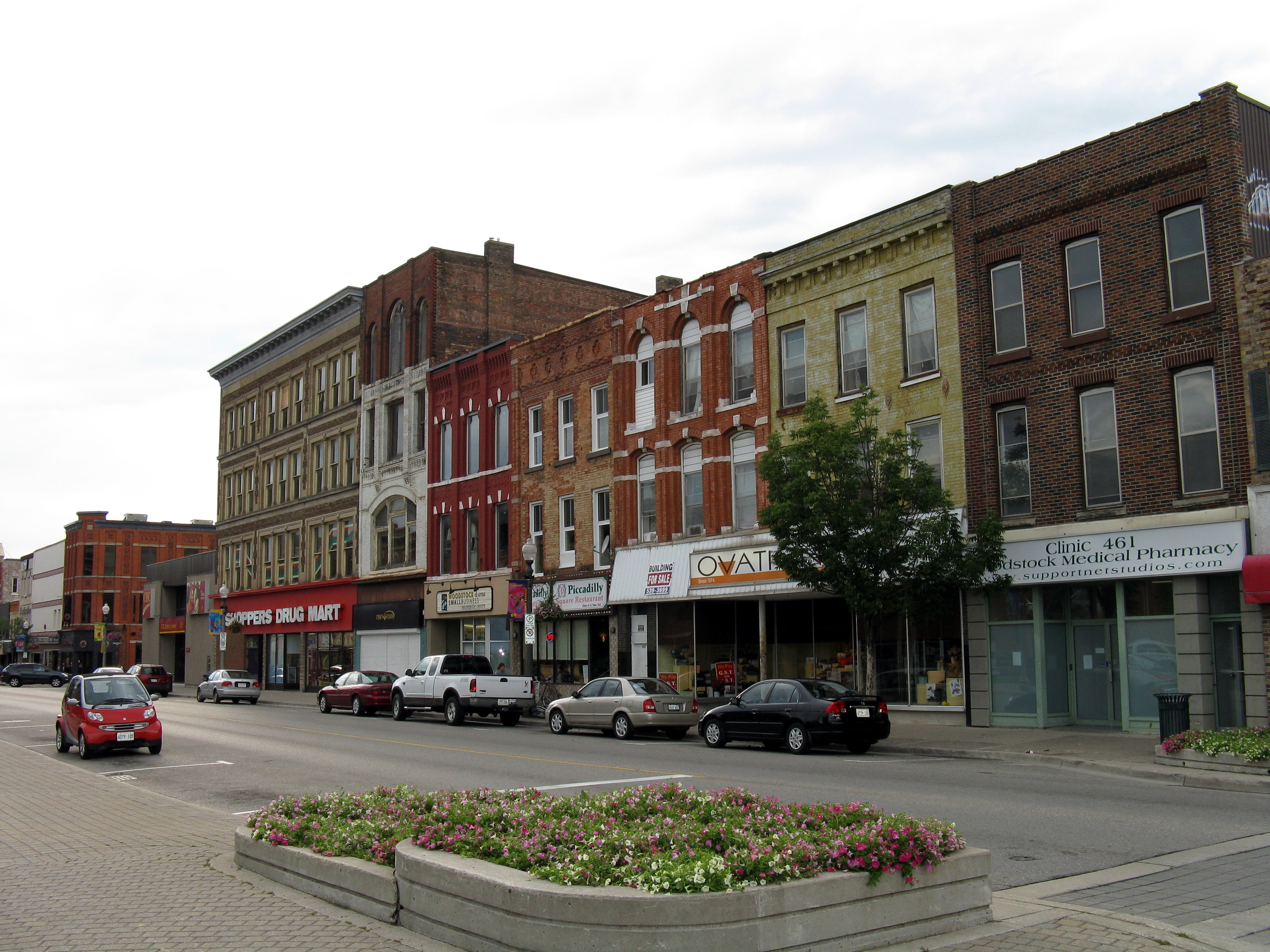
- Dundas Street, Woodstock

- Flag Logo
- Motto: Growing Stronger, Together
- Map showing Oxford County location in Ontario
- Coordinates: 42°58′N 80°48′W
- Country: Canada
- Province: Ontario
- Incorporated: 1850
- Seat: Woodstock

Area
  - Land: 2,038.18 km^{2} (786.95 sq mi)

Population (2021)
  - Total: 121,781
  - Density: 59.7/km^{2} (155/sq mi)
- Time zone: UTC-5 (Eastern (EST))
  - Summer (DST): UTC-4 (Eastern (EDT))
- Website: www.oxfordcounty.ca

Oxford County is a regional municipality in the Canadian province of Ontario. Highway 401 runs east–west through the centre of the county, creating an urban industrial corridor with more than half the county's population, spanning 25 km between the Toyota auto assembly plant in Woodstock and the CAMI General Motors auto assembly plant in Ingersoll. The local economy is otherwise dominated by agriculture, especially the dairy industry.

The Oxford County regional seat is in Woodstock. Oxford County has been a regional municipality since 2001 but has retained the word "county" in its name. It has a two-tier municipal government structure, with the lower-tier municipalities being the result of a merger in 1975 of a larger number of separate municipalities that previously existed before the restructuring. It also comprises a single Statistics Canada census division, and a single electoral division for federal and provincial elections for which the precise boundaries have been revised from time to time. For part of its history, it was divided into two ridings, Oxford North, for federal and provincial elections, and Oxford South, for federal and provincial elections, for each of which see their own pages. Oxford County had its own school board until 1998, when it was merged into the Thames Valley District School Board. It had its own Health Unit until 2018, when it was merged into the Southwestern Public Health Unit.

== Local government ==
Oxford County consists of eight lower-tier municipalities (in order of 2021 population):

- City of Woodstock (46,705)
- Town of Tillsonburg (18,615)
- Town of Ingersoll (13,693)
- Township of Norwich (11,151)
- Township of Zorra (8,628)
- Township of East Zorra-Tavistock (7,841)
- Township of South-West Oxford (7,583)
- Township of Blandford-Blenheim (7,565)

Local municipal governments in Ontario exercise authority delegated to them by the provincial government, which may choose at any time to increase or decrease the powers given to them through enabling statutes. In the early days of Upper Canada, the relevant legislation provided for convening an annual meeting of property owners in each township, who were obligated to choose such officers as a township clerk, a constable, property tax assessors and collectors, fence viewers and pound keepers. It was a matter of pride in each township to keep track of population growth, and several townships were divided as they grew, giving separate town meetings and local officers to East, West and North divisions of Oxford-on-the-Thames, East and West divisions of Nissouri, and East and West divisions of Zorra.

The individuals were responsible for the administrative work necessary to enforce the laws of the province and to carry out decisions made at the district level by the area's Justices of the Peace, appointed by the Governor, who met periodically at the designated district courthouse for deliberations known as Quarter Sessions. The paternalistic authority of the Governor and his chosen Justices of the Peace continued as the hierarchy for local government until 1841. From the earliest days of settlement, the District Court was convened in the Long Point Settlement, first at Turkey Point, then at the village of Vittoria. It was moved to London in 1826. The Brock District, containing Oxford County's territory, was then split off from the London District in 1840.

By the time a courthouse had been built for the Brock District at Woodstock, legislative changes were introduced by the province to provide for election of district council members from each township to take over the local government role from the Justices of the Peace, but appointment of the warden and senior administrative officers for each district council remained the responsibility of the provincial government.

District councils were abolished and replaced with fully elected county councils by the implementation of the Baldwin Act in 1850. The provincial legislation defined the structure for fully-elected local municipal government in Ontario for the next century. In addition to defining the powers of the county council, the legislation created authority for township councils and provided for creation of village, town, and city councils. Woodstock, Ingersoll, Tillsonburg, and other communities within Oxford County were in time incorporated under those provisions as separate municipalities.

At around the same time as the Baldwin Act came into force, some of the townships that had been included in the Brock District were severed off to become parts of a new Brant County and a reconfigured Middlesex County. Norwich Township was divided into North and South in 1855. In the 1960s, the Ontario government began simplifying the structure of local government in select parts of the province, and the process reached Oxford County in 1975, when the number of separate township and village councils was reduced to the current five townships. Three urban municipalities also remained: Ingersoll, Tillsonburg, and Woodstock. The county boundaries were also enlarged to include the entire urban areas of Tavistock in the north and of Tillsonburg in the south.

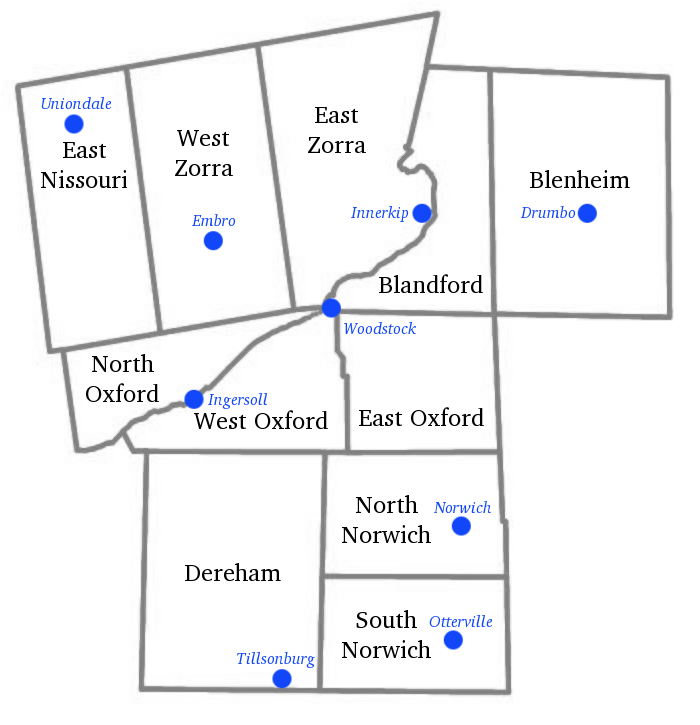
Townships from 1855 to 1975, with selected communities in blue.

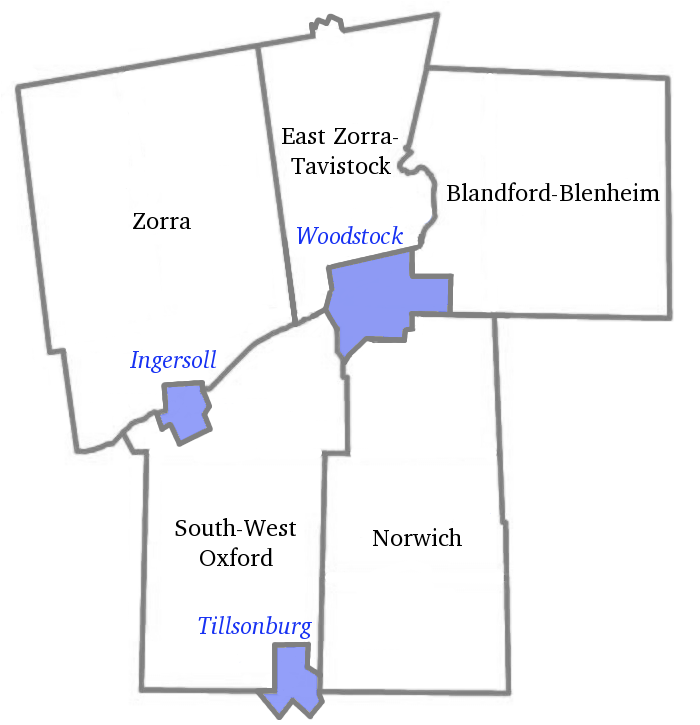
Oxford County municipal boundaries today, as established in 1975.

== History ==
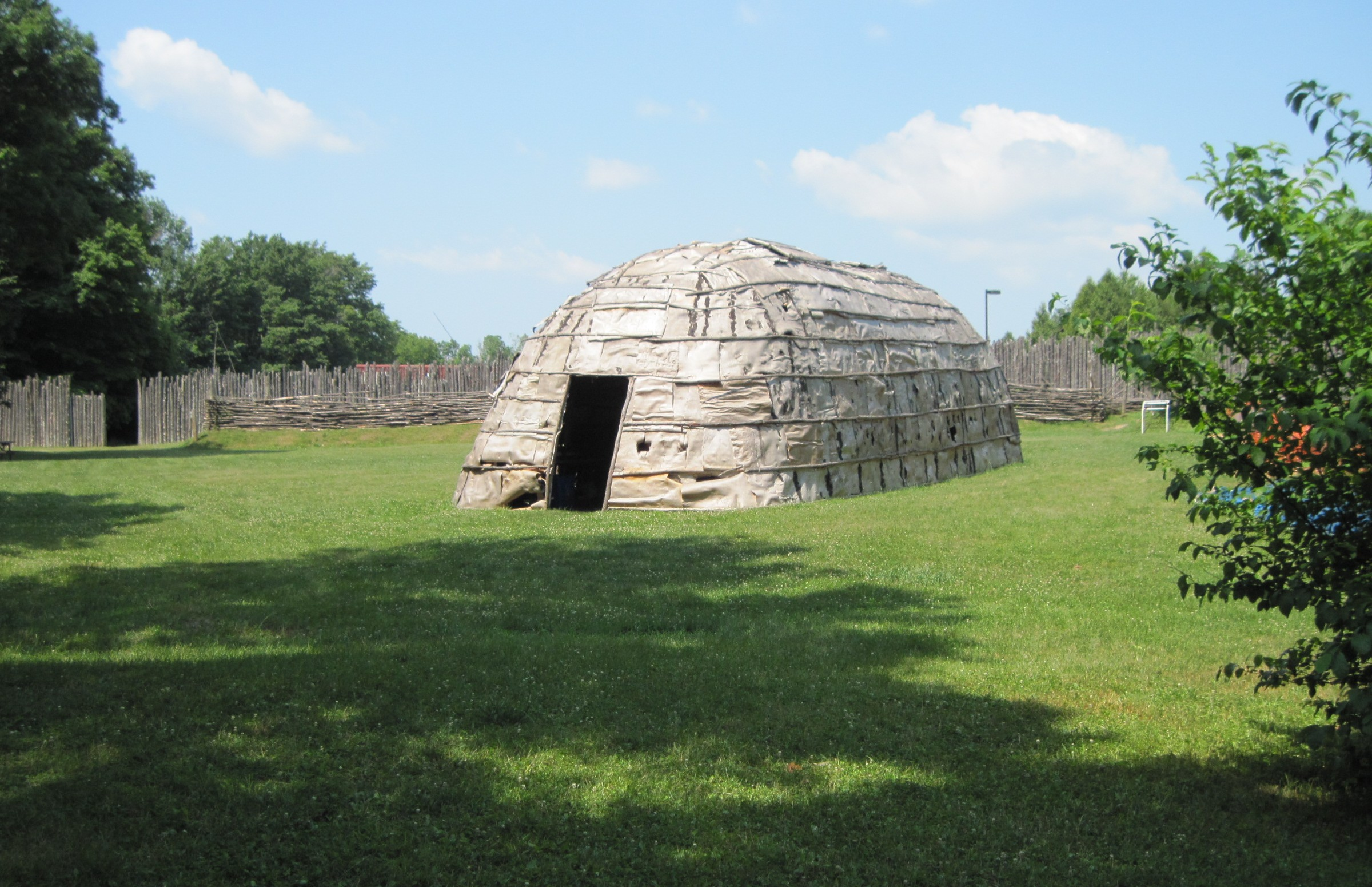
recreation of longhouse at Lawson village site in London (Museum of Ontario Archaeology)

The geographical area that is now Oxford County was populated with Neutral/Attawandaron longhouse villages for many centuries but was abandoned to First Nations nomadic peoples by the 1650s, as a result of warfare with Iroquois and epidemics resulting from European contact. The land was acquired by the Crown by three treaties, signed in 1792 (by chiefs of the Mississaugas First Nation), in 1796 (by chiefs of the Chippewas First Nation) and 1827 (by chiefs of the Chippewas). They depended for their certainty on an earlier treaty known as the McKee Purchase of 1790, signed at Detroit with 35 chiefs from the Potawatomi, Wyandot, Ojibwe, and Odawa First Nations.

Oxford County was created by the legislature of the province of Upper Canada in 1798 by an enactment that came into force at the beginning of 1800. The immediate purpose was for better organization of the local militia and the improvement of the social order by the appointment of a lord lieutenant, part of the aristocratic framework for the new province that had been put in place by Governor Simcoe. The county lieutenant appointed for Oxford was William Claus, a grandson of Sir William Johnson and then head of the Indian Department responsible for oversight of the Six Nations settled along the Grand River tract running north and south on the eastern boundary of Oxford.

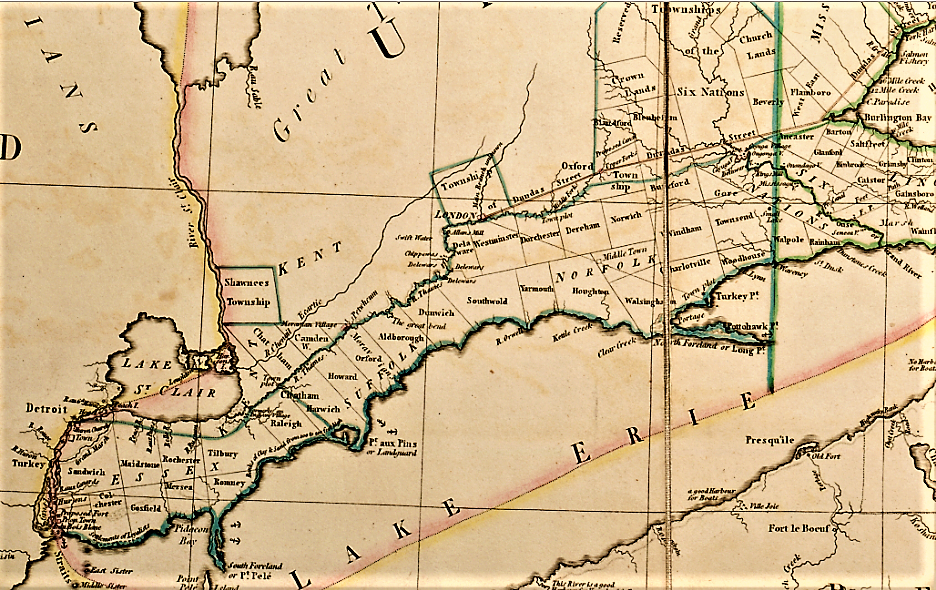
circa 1795 township layout, showing lands acquired by McKee Purchase

As first established, Oxford County consisted of the townships of Blenheim, Burford, Oxford-on-the-Thames, Blandford, Norwich, and Dereham (lands to the north of the Thames River had not yet been purchased by the Crown). The first three had been receiving settlers since the summer of 1793, under the leadership of Thomas Hornor (Blenheim), Benajah Mallory (Burford), and Thomas Ingersoll (Oxford-on-the-Thames), each of whom was also captain of the militia in his respective township. Claus remained resident in Niagara, and his appointment as the Crown's head for the county set off a rivalry between Hornor and Mallory for the prestige of appointment as Claus's resident deputy lieutenant within the county, eventually won by Hornor. Thomas Ingersoll left the county, but the rivalry between Hornor and Mallory for pre-eminence continued for more than a decade, as Mallory was elected as the county's representative in the legislative assembly for Upper Canada in 1804 and again in 1808. All of that was swept away with the coming of the War of 1812. Appointed temporary administrator of the government, General Isaac Brock moved Claus to the head of the Lincoln Militia and appointed Henry Bostwick to head the Oxford Militia, thus passing over Hornor for any role in the war effort (Bostwick was the son of a former associate of Thomas Ingersoll). Mallory lost the 1812 election and turned traitor during the war by defecting to the American side as a captain in a volunteer corps.

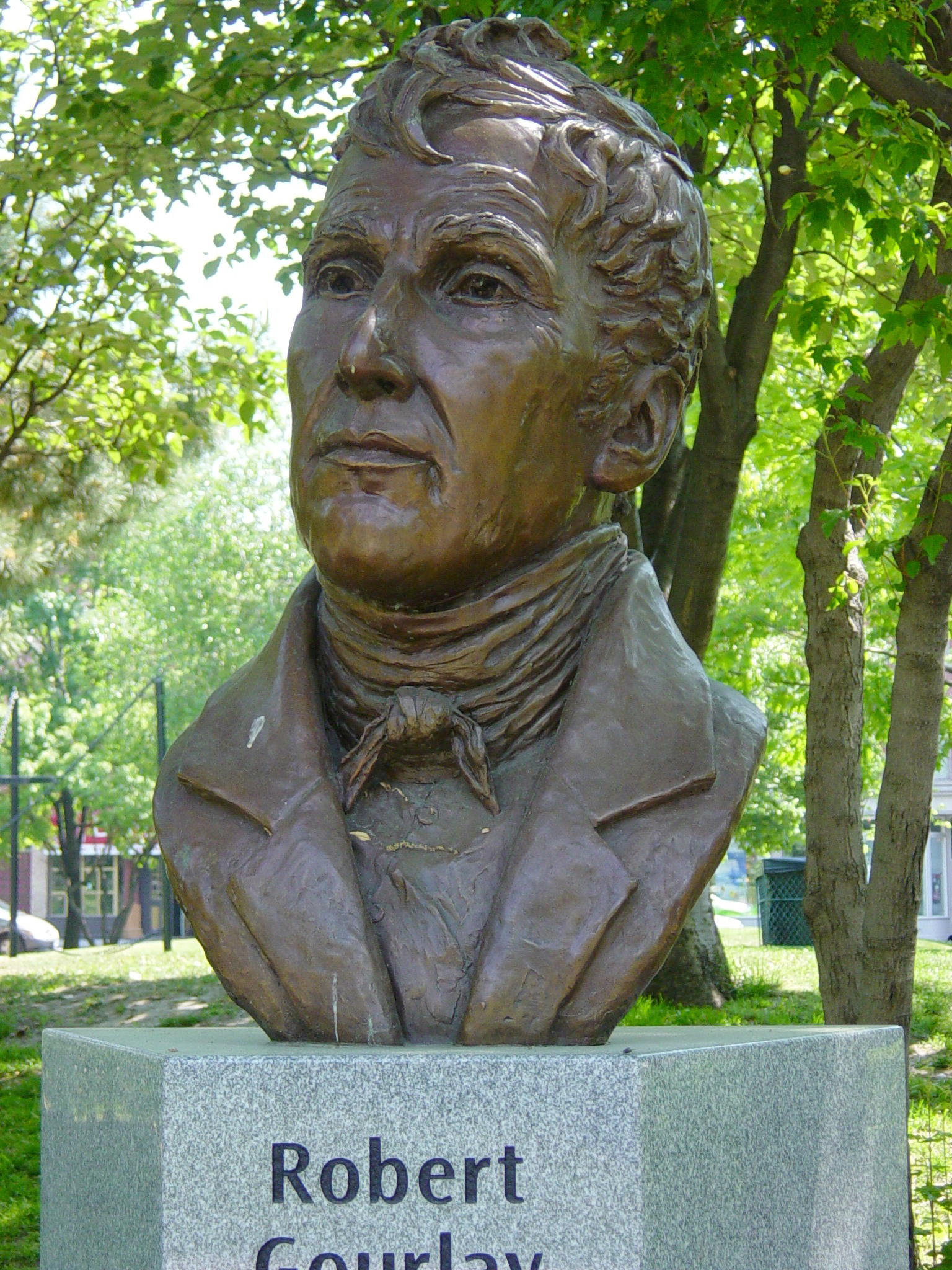
Robert Gourlay (1778–1863)

By the end of the first quarter-century of its development, Oxford's population was nearing 2,000 people, but many problems were holding back its development. Robert Gourlay, a Scotsman whose wife had inherited nearly 1,000 acres in Dereham township (around today's Mount Elgin), made the journey to Oxford in 1817 to inspect the prize but could not believe that the township was still a complete wilderness. He began a public movement to find solutions through public gatherings and newspaper advocacy all over Upper Canada but in return was prosecuted and jailed by the government for sedition. Gourlay's two-volume Statistical account of Upper Canada, compiled with a view to a grand system of emigration, published in London in 1822, presented a detailed analysis based upon reports submitted to him by citizen groups in 57 townships who yearned for improvements. Gourlay spent the next 35 years away from Canada but returned to his land in Oxford in 1856 to run for election.

George Tillson, founder of Tillsonburg

Gourlay was just one of many voices that created dissatisfaction in Oxford and area over the slow pace of growth that continued in the 1820s and 1830s. American-born settlers were again making their way to the county, such as George Tillson, the founder of Tillsonburg, and Abraham Beach, the founder of Beachville. By 1821 all of Thomas Ingersoll's sons had returned to create the village that became Ingersoll. Thomas Hornor was elevated again as the county's champion, appointed in 1820 to head the Oxford Militia and served as the county's representative in the legislative assembly throughout the next decade. There, he was among the members who sought repeal of the law that had been used to imprison Gourlay and opposed laws aimed at restricting rights of settlers who had come from the United States. The Crown entered into a treaty to purchase the lands north of the Thames River and two more townships were added to the county, Zorra and Nissouri, which was followed by an influx of Scottish and Irish immigrants displaced from their homes, such as the large numbers of Sutherlandshire Highlanders who created a Gaelic-speaking enclave around the village of Embro in Zorra Township. Many of them arrived destitute in Oxford after they had suffered brutal evictions from their homeland, often by mass burnings of homes described by their countryman, Donald McLeod, who lived out his remaining days in Oxford after completing his book Gloomy Memories. A new government program that gave preferential grants to encourage retired British military officers to settle in Upper Canada in the 1830s was successful in bringing many to Oxford who showed a determination to make Woodstock the seat of a new local aristocracy, just as Simcoe had envisioned 40 years earlier. The "father of the settlement" at Woodstock was Rear-Admiral Henry Vansittart, surrounded by an assortment of retired army and navy officers who had been schooled in the Napoleonic Wars.

Resentment of the old settlers grew to rebellion, with Oxford's elected member in the legislative assembly, Dr. Charles Duncombe, taking on the role as leader of an uprising in December 1837. In the aftermath, Duncombe was driven into exile, and one of the Woodstock retired Royal Navy veterans, Captain Andrew Drew (Vansittart's right-hand man), created an international incident that is still studied by legal scholars, when he led a raid into the United States to seize and burn a paddlewheel steamer being used in the Niagara River by the exiled rebels, leaving it to drift over Niagara Falls.

The decade of political turmoil that followed resulted in greater democratic government at the local and provincial levels, as Oxford repeatedly elected Reformers to serve as the county's representative in the legislative assembly. They included a British colonial administrator (Sir Francis Hincks) and two Fathers of Confederation (George Brown and Sir Oliver Mowat). Enormous growth in the 1840s to the 1860s also became a cure for past grievances. The population chart tells the story and shows the county eventually reached a population plateau in the 1870s that continued well into the first half of the 20th century.

A new era of urbanization starting in the 1950s added 25,000 people to Woodstock, 10,000 to Tillsonburg, and 6,000 to Ingersoll, which has been most of Oxford County's modern growth.

== Demographics ==
As a census division in the 2021 Census of Population conducted by Statistics Canada, Oxford County had a population of 121,781 living in 47,876 of its 49,445 total private dwellings, a change of 9.9% from its 2016 population of 110,846. With a land area of 2,038.18 km^{2} (786.95 sq mi), it had a population density of 59.7/km^{2} (154.8/sq mi) in 2021.

Canada census – Oxford community profile

	2021	2016	2011
Population	121,781 (+9.9% from 2016)	110,862 (+4.9% from 2011)	105,719 (2.9% from 2006)
Land area	2,038.18 km^{2} (786.95 sq mi)	2,039.61 km^{2} (787.50 sq mi)	2,039.56 km^{2} (787.48 sq mi)
Population density	59.7/km^{2} (155/sq mi)	54.4/km^{2} (141/sq mi)	51.8/km^{2} (134/sq mi)
Median age	41.6 (M: 40.4, F: 42.8)	42.3 (M: 40.9, F: 43.6)
Private dwellings	49,445 (total) 47,876 (occupied)	45,350 (total) 44,266 (occupied)	43,367 (total)
Median household income	$87,000	$72,294

References: 2021 2016 2011

Historical census populations – Oxford County, Ontario

Year	Pop.	±%
1817	1,715	—
1841	15,621	+810.8%
1851	32,638	+108.9%
1861	46,185	+41.5%
1881	49,168	+6.5%
1891	48,552	−1.3%
1901	47,154	−2.9%
1921	47,360	+0.4%
1931	48,454	+2.3%

Year	Pop.	±%
1941	51,610	+6.5%
1951	59,440	+15.2%
1956	65,897	+10.9%
1961	71,169	+8.0%
1966	76,018	+6.8%
1971	80,349	+5.7%
1976	85,337	+6.2%
1981	85,920	+0.7%
1986	85,364	−0.6%

Year	Pop.	±%
1991	92,888	+8.8%
1996	97,142	+4.6%
2001	99,270	+2.2%
2006	102,756	+3.5%
2011	105,719	+2.9%
2016	110,846	+4.8%
2021	121,781	+9.9%

2016 Population figure based on revised count.
Source: Statistics Canada

== Diversity ==
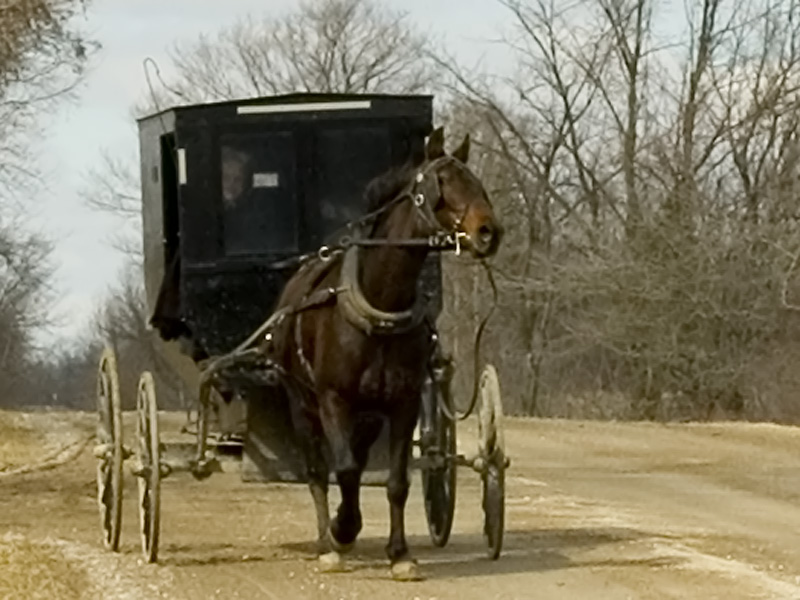
Old Order Mennonite resident of Oxford County

The Census Commissioner for Oxford County in 1852, Thomas Shenston, compiled elaborate statistics from census records and published the results in a book that year, the first ever to give a detailed examination of the county. His analysis of place of birth shows that more than half (17,990) of the county's population had been born in the province, and of the remainder, the largest groups were from Scotland (4,685), England (3,724), the United States (2,618), Ireland (2,371), and Germany (322). He reports that there were 123 Blacks, 101 of them in Norwich township, which had a community of escaped slaves settled around the village of Otterville. There were 47 distinct religious denominations in the total population, of which 8,493 were Methodists in 5 different denominations, 8,300 were in Scotch or Presbyterian denominations, 5,760 Anglicans, 4,579 Baptists in 5 different denominations, 2,194 were Roman Catholics, 730 Quakers, and 161 Mennonites, amongst other smaller groups including Israelites, Infidels, Free-Thinkers and Heathens.

== Historic hamlets, postal villages and rural clusters ==
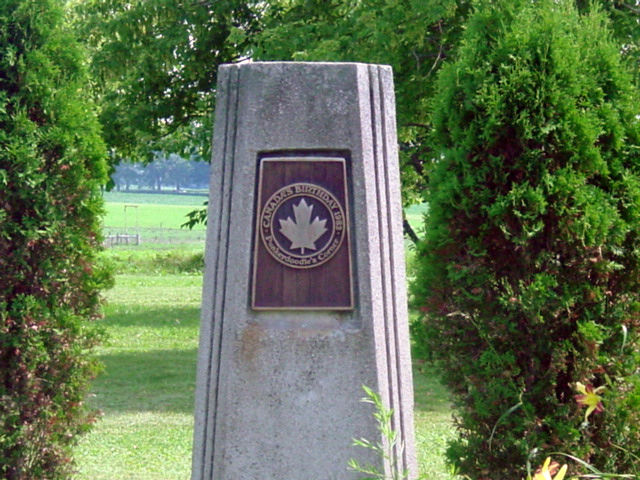
Punkeydoodles monument, 1982

Oxford County has a multitude of place names identifying the communities which have grown up as service hubs in the course of the county's history. A large proportion of these were granted their own post offices and thus became known as "postal villages", details of which can be found in the online database maintained by Library and Archives Canada. For purposes of modern land use planning, the county now distinguishes between Large Urban Centres being Woodstock, Tillsonburg and Ingersoll, and Rural settlement areas, categorized as Serviced Villages, Villages or Rural Clusters. There are 21 Villages and nearly 40 Rural Clusters currently identified by the county's land use plan. An online database of historic place names and locations of these communities is maintained by the Oxford County Library. Most unusual place name in the county belongs to Punkeydoodles Corners, located at the convergence of the border lines of Oxford County, Perth County and Waterloo County, thus making it part of all three counties. It drew national attention on Canada Day in 1982, when former Prime Minister Joe Clark was present for festivities. To mark the occasion, a post office was opened there for one day to issue commemorative stamps and a monument was erected.

- Beachville
- Beaconsfield
- Bennington
- Braemar
- Bright
- Brooksdale
- Brownsville
- Burgessville
- Campbellton
- Canning
- Cassel
- Centreville
- Chesterfield
- Cobble Hill
- Cornellville
- Culloden
- Delmer
- Drumbo
- Eastwood
- Embro
- Fairview
- Goble's Corners
- Hagle's Corners
- Harrington West
- Hawtrey
- Hickson
- Holbrook
- Ingersoll
- Innerkip
- Kintore
- Lakeside
- Lyon's Corners
- Maplewood
- Medina
- Moscow
- Mount Elgin
- Nissouri
- Newark
- Norwich
- Oliver
- Oriel
- Ostrander
- Otterville
- Oxford Centre
- Peebles
- Piper's Corners
- Plattsville
- Princeton
- Punkeydoodles Corners
- Ratho
- Rayside
- Richwood
- Salford (formerly Manchester)
- South Zorra
- Springford
- Strathallen
- Sweaburg
- Tavistock
- Thamesford
- Tillsonburg
- Vandecar
- Verschoyle
- Walmer
- Washington
- Wolverton
- Woodstock
- Youngsville

== Archaeology, history and genealogy research ==
For the first several generations of European settlement, knowledge of First Nations occupation was limited to souvenir hunters who searched freshly-plowed fields for whatever relics had turned up. The first comprehensive scientific archaeology in Oxford County was carried out by William J. Wintemberg (1876–1941), the "Father of Canadian Archaeology", who grew up just outside the northern boundary of the county and conducted extensive studies throughout Oxford during his career. Modern-day evaluations of new site discoveries still reference Wintemberg's concepts, although researchers sometimes caution against fitting old moulds, particularly when interpreting the 15th century longhouse village site discovered at Tillsonburg twenty years ago which is considered "off the charts" by comparison to other sites which have been found and studied.

Attempts to record the history of Oxford County were few and far between during the first century of European settlement and growth. Thomas S. Shenston (1822–1895), the Oxford County commissioner for the provincial census of 1851, authored The Oxford gazetteer; containing a complete history of the county of Oxford, from its first settlement... in 1852, but in footnotes to several portions of the text he indicates that the historical narrative he had compiled was forced out of the book by the amount of census data tabulated in its pages. Despite its shortcomings, the book was reprinted by the county as a Canada Centennial project in 1967. When the mania for illustrated county atlases swept across Ontario in the 1870s, Oxford was included, but the volume published by Walker and Miles of Toronto in 1876 devoted only five pages to a summary of the county's history. Oxford was not included in the mania which created county history volumes in the 1880s and 1890s, but the Oxford Historical and Museum Society was established in 1897, and a great leap forward took place in 1948 when it partnered with the Royal Ontario Museum and the University of Western Ontario to create the first of what the Ontario government planned as a network of county museums to aid local schools in teaching students about their history. Since then, the Oxford Historical Society has published a series of booklets as history bulletins and a quarterly newsletter, and also ensures that more recent books by local historians are kept in print and available for purchase.

Although little was written in the 19th century about the county's history, directories of businesses and property owners were very popular and most of those which were published between the 1850s and 1890s are now available and searchable online – a boon to genealogists. Oxford County has a very active branch of the Ontario Genealogical Society.

The Oxford Historical Society collections are housed with those of the Genealogical Society in a modern facility opened by the county in 2012 for the Oxford County Archives.

== Economic development ==
=== Roads, canals, railways, and highways ===
The greatest hindrance to developing pioneer Oxford was its landlocked location, remote from the Great Lakes.

Governor Simcoe's vision for the area in the 1790s included planning a government road joining Burlington Bay to the site of a new provincial capital at London, through a government town where the road first reached the Thames River in Oxford township (now Woodstock), and also plans for a canal across Blandford and Blenheim township joining the Thames River to the Grand River, thereby creating an inland water transport route through the whole area from Detroit to Brantford (see 1795 and 1800 map views on this page). The canal was never built, and the 'Governor's Road' (today a part of Dundas Street) could not be used for decades because no bridge was built where it was to cross the Grand River (now Paris, which did not begin to develop as a village until the 1820s). The reality was that pioneer land transportation continued to follow the ancient footpath from Burlington Bay to the Thames River using a river crossing at what became known as Brant's Ford (Brantford) on the Six Nations lands, then down the banks of the Thames River to Detroit. Thomas Ingersoll bore the expense of making the path passable for wagons between Brant's Ford and the Thames River as part of his efforts to develop Oxford township in the mid-1790s. Later government appropriations extended that roadwork all the way down the Thames to Detroit – what was henceforth known as the Detroit Road. Woodstock's merchants gained support to improve the road along a detour taking it to the Vansittart landholdings (Eastwood) along the Governor's Road east of Woodstock, and it was that route which became Highway 53 through Burford and Brantford to Hamilton. The wisdom of a road link from Burlington Bay (Hamilton) through Brantford into Oxford has been reaffirmed with the completion of Highway 403, which also joins the 401 to the east of Woodstock. The portion which originally led into the centre of Oxford is now a county road named the Old Stage Road. The 401 itself replicates the old Detroit Road.

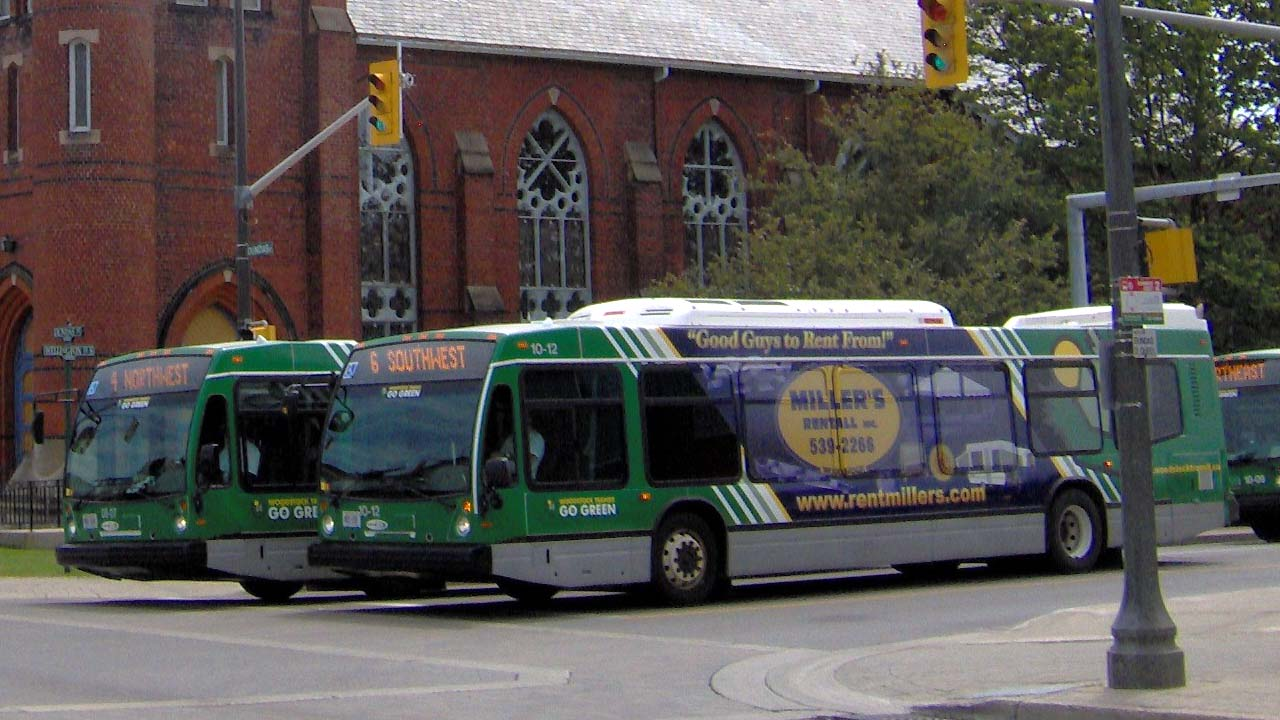
Woodstock Transit buses departing terminal

Transportation within Oxford was greatly improved with toll roads and railways planned in the 1830s which were actually built in the 1840s and later. Ingersoll people collaborated with Tillsonburg and points south to construct the Ingersoll and Port Burwell Plank and Gravel Road starting in 1849, which was later extended as a toll road north through Zorra into Perth County. It endures today as Highway 19. Woodstock collaborated with Norwich and Port Dover to build another north–south toll road in the 1850s which was later extended up into Perth County through Tavistock. It endures today as Highway 59. Railways were built criss-crossing Oxford in the 1850s and 1860s, joining Woodstock and Ingersoll to Detroit and Toronto, as well as joining Woodstock to Stratford and Port Dover and Norwich to Brantford and Port Burwell. An electric street railway joined Woodstock and Ingersoll through Beachville from 1900 to the 1920s, but was replaced by a bus service which succumbed in the 1940s to private automobiles as the preferred mode of travel thereafter. Woodstock has developed a transit system which now operates a fleet of 11 buses six days a week, and charter bus companies have experimented with other local services.

=== Dairy industry ===
A 2008 summary put Oxford's annual milk production at 60 million gallons from the county's 344 dairy farms, the highest output of any county in Ontario, considered to be enough to supply 3 million people. Farm cash receipts for dairy farming in Oxford in 2016 were more than $223 million. The first two cows were brought into Oxford-on-the-Thames by Thomas Ingersoll in the 1790s, and by 1810 the township was famous for butter and cheese made by farmers' wives for local sale. On some farms this grew to a truly industrial scale, with some in the Ingersoll area producing as much as one hundred pounds a day by the 1830s. The queen of cheesemakers was Lydia Ranney on their family farm just south of Ingersoll, who was creating thousand pound cheeses for prize competitions at provincial expositions by the 1840s.

=== Wheat, corn and soybeans ===
The first crop which had earning potential for Oxford's pioneers was wheat. In 1852 it was estimated that the county had produced 611,000 bushels, of which 450,000 bushels were exported. When wheat yields fell as a result of soil exhaustion and insect infestations by the 1860s, greater reliance was placed on dairying for butter and cheesemaking. Corn and soybean production now compete with dairying for available farmland, driving up land prices. Wheat is also resurgent. In 1852, only 2,700 acres were devoted to corn. By 2012, corn was being grown on 158,000 acres, producing 25 million bushels. In the same year, soybeans were grown on 77,000 acres yielding 3.7 million bushels, and wheat was grown on 21,000 acres, yielding 2.1 million bushels. As of 2016, Oxford was growing 7 per cent of the corn produced in Ontario, 4 per cent of the wheat, and 3 per cent of its soybeans, resulting in more than $180 million farm cash receipts.

=== Tobacco ===
Despite decades of public education and government restrictions on marketing, the worldwide revenue in the tobacco industry is still in the range of $500 billion annually. Ontario's tobacco belt – an area with sandy loam and warm temperatures ideal for growing tobacco – stretches across the southern portion of Oxford County and the northern portions of Elgin and Norfolk. The crop gained in popularity in the 1920s and by the 1960s the whole economy of the area was dominated by tobacco growing, accounting for 90 per cent of all tobacco grown in Canada. Aggressive expansion of crop area led to recognition of increased risk the area could turn into a desert, but this was remedied with tree-planting. The seasonal workforce demands drew annual influxes of migrant workers and conditions which were made legend in Stompin' Tom Connors' 1970 hit song "Tillsonburg". To cut back production as part of its anti-smoking campaigns, a buyout program was implemented by the federal government in 2008, with payouts totalling $350 million to farmers who agreed to switch to other crops (the buyout funds came from a $1 billion settlement agreed by the major cigarette manufacturers as a result of prosecution for illegal activities). The result was a drop in annual production from 84 million pounds to 20 million pounds. Farmers who agreed to the buyout have favoured a switch to fruit and vegetable crops.

=== Poultry and Other Livestock ===
The pioneer scene with a few hens scratching in the yard and a rooster crowing atop a fence rail has long since given way to giant poultry barns. As of 2017, Oxford County is the third highest chicken producer in the province, with 108 farms generating 48 million kilograms of chickens per year (8% of the provincial total). It has 15 turkey farms that raise nearly half a million birds per year (12% of the provincial total). It is the second highest pork producer in Ontario, with 128 farms raising nearly 1 million hogs per year (14% of the provincial total). The county's beef farmers raise about 100,000 head per year (6% of the provincial total). Farm cash receipts from these 4 categories of livestock were about $190 million in Oxford in 2016.

=== Manufacturing ===
==== Forest products ====
The earliest activities which could be categorised as manufacturing for sale were byproducts of the pioneers' war on the forests which covered the county. As part of his experiment in granting townships to proprietors such as Thomas Hornor, Benajah Mallory and Thomas Ingersoll in the 1790s, Gov. Simcoe imposed terms which sometimes required construction of saw mills. Thomas Hornor was the first to comply, putting a mill into operation in Blenheim Township by 1795, but his millpond dam collapsed and no immediate attempt was made to rebuild. Efforts in Dorchester Township just to the west of Oxford's boundary by William Reynolds and Seth Putnam were more successful, but production from their saw mills remained on a small scale for many years. A visitor in 1804 described the difficulty faced rafting lumber from those mills down the Thames River nearly 300 kilometres to sell at Detroit – three or four men could deliver 25,000 board feet at a time in this way and bring back goods to sell upon return, but it was a ten- to fourteen-day journey. Export sales were more frequent for potash and pearlash derived from burning timber and boiling the ashes; individual settlers had little wheat to spare in their early years, but plenty of wood ashes that could be boiled and bartered with local merchants in exchange for supplies. Export of sawn lumber eventually became a booming market by the 1840s, increased with the improvement of roads by toll companies, and even more so after the construction of railways through Oxford.

==== Cheese factories ====
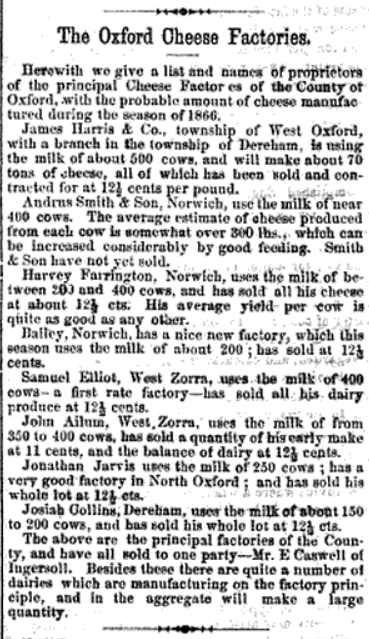
1866 factory results from Canada Farmer

Grist and flour mills, furniture factories, carriage and wagon factories, tanneries and shoe factories, foundries producing farm equipment, and knitting mills were all becoming commonplace in the county by the 1850s, but the real revolution in manufacturing activity came in the 1860s, with the arrival of cheese factories. It is accepted that the first cheese factories in Canada were established in Oxford County, although there is still some controversy about which one was the very first. Officially the title is given to Harvey Farrington for a factory in Norwich township opened in 1864, but it is likely his was preceded by the factory operated by Andes Smith in the same township. To display his accomplishments, Smith manufactured a 4,000 pound cheese, believed to have been the biggest ever made, which was exhibited at the New York State Fair in Utica and then the Provincial Exhibition in Toronto in 1865, but the fate of that monster foretold Smith's doom. In the course of hauling it from the exhibition grounds to the railway station for shipment to England for exhibition and sale, a wheel came off the wagon and the cheese was overturned and broke apart. Smith went bankrupt the following year, and fame passed to Harvey Farrington who had built a co-op factory at which risk was shared.

The real coup came when a consortium in Ingersoll manufactured the 7,300 pound "Mammoth Cheese" which was successfully displayed in New York state as well as in England. The success of the Ingersoll venture led to the town becoming the home of the newly created Canadian Dairymen's Association in 1867, and also the cheese export market seat for a throng of cheese factories which quickly went into operation around the county. Cheese factory production in neighbourhood factories surged for the next half century, and millions of pounds of cheese passed through export warehouses in Ingersoll, then later Woodstock as well, but then began to taper off before the First World War and had greatly fallen off by the 1930s. By then Oxford's milk production was being trucked to London and Toronto rather than local cheese factories. The Ingersoll Packing Company, later renamed the Ingersoll Cream Cheese Company, continued a large-scale manufacture for international markets, but by 1956 Maclean's lamented to the whole country that Ingersoll cheese might become a thing of the past. It did by the 1970s. After lying vacant for many years, the Ingersoll cheese factory was reopened in 1999 as Local Dairy producing artisanal cheese, cultured butter, and yogurt. Other artisanal factories such as Gunn's Hill near Woodstock have also taken off, giving a new meaning to Oxford's Cheese Trails tourism promotions. There are currently 5 provincially-licensed factories in Oxford.

==== Food processing ====
The county's economic development efforts aimed at increasing food processing within Oxford suffered a setback in 2018 with the closing of the Cold Springs Farms turkey processing and feed mill plant at Thamesford, with the loss of 425 jobs. Cold Springs was founded by W. Harvey Beatty (1916–1994), a dynamo who worked around crippling injuries to build an enterprise starting in Thamesford in 1949 that eventually included 60 farms in Ontario. For his business accomplishments and commitment to industry organizations, he was inducted into the Canadian Agriculture Hall of Fame in 1995 and the Ontario Agricultural Hall of Fame in 2018.

==== Heavy industry ====
Vast portions of Oxford County are underlain with limestone deposits which are ideal for manufacture of lime and cement. A deposit of unusual purity 100 feet deep stretches from Norwich up to Embro through the centre of the county, with potential extraction volumes of 3.5 billion tonnes. Over 3,000 acres of the deposit area has been licensed by the Ontario government for limestone quarrying. The village of Beachville is atop the deposit and became well known from its earliest days for small kilns burning limestone to produce lime, but manufacturing on a heavy industrial scale now takes place in mills adjacent to quarry properties covering thousands of acres in the county, operated by Lafarge Canada Inc. (1,400 acres) and Carmeuse Lime (Canada) Limited (1,800 acres). The mills which burn the limestone were built in the 1950s with revolving kilns which were the largest pieces of mobile factory equipment in the world, some measuring 10 feet in diameter by 450 feet long. The rate of extraction estimated in the 1980s was an average of 600,000 tonnes per year. It is an energy-intensive industry with very high carbon outputs. Research involving Lafarge in England aims to develop products that will use rather than release some of the carbon.

Automobile assembly plants in Ingersoll (CAMI/General Motors) and Woodstock (Toyota) and related parts manufacturers, warehouses and trucking companies have been a growing part of Oxford County's industrial base since 1985. The Ingersoll assembly plant reached production of its 5 millionth vehicle in May 2018.

== Services ==
=== Health ===
Oxford County has full service general hospitals in Woodstock and Tillsonburg. A limited services hospital with acute care facilities is located in Ingersoll. All three hospitals have 24/7 emergency room facilities. Each has associated with it a branch of Woodingford Lodge, a long-term care living network operated by Oxford County on a not-for-profit basis. The Oxford County Community Support Services Network offers a variety of health based Community Support Services to help Seniors and Adults with Disabilities remain in their homes. 1-888-866-7518

=== Police, fire and ambulance ===
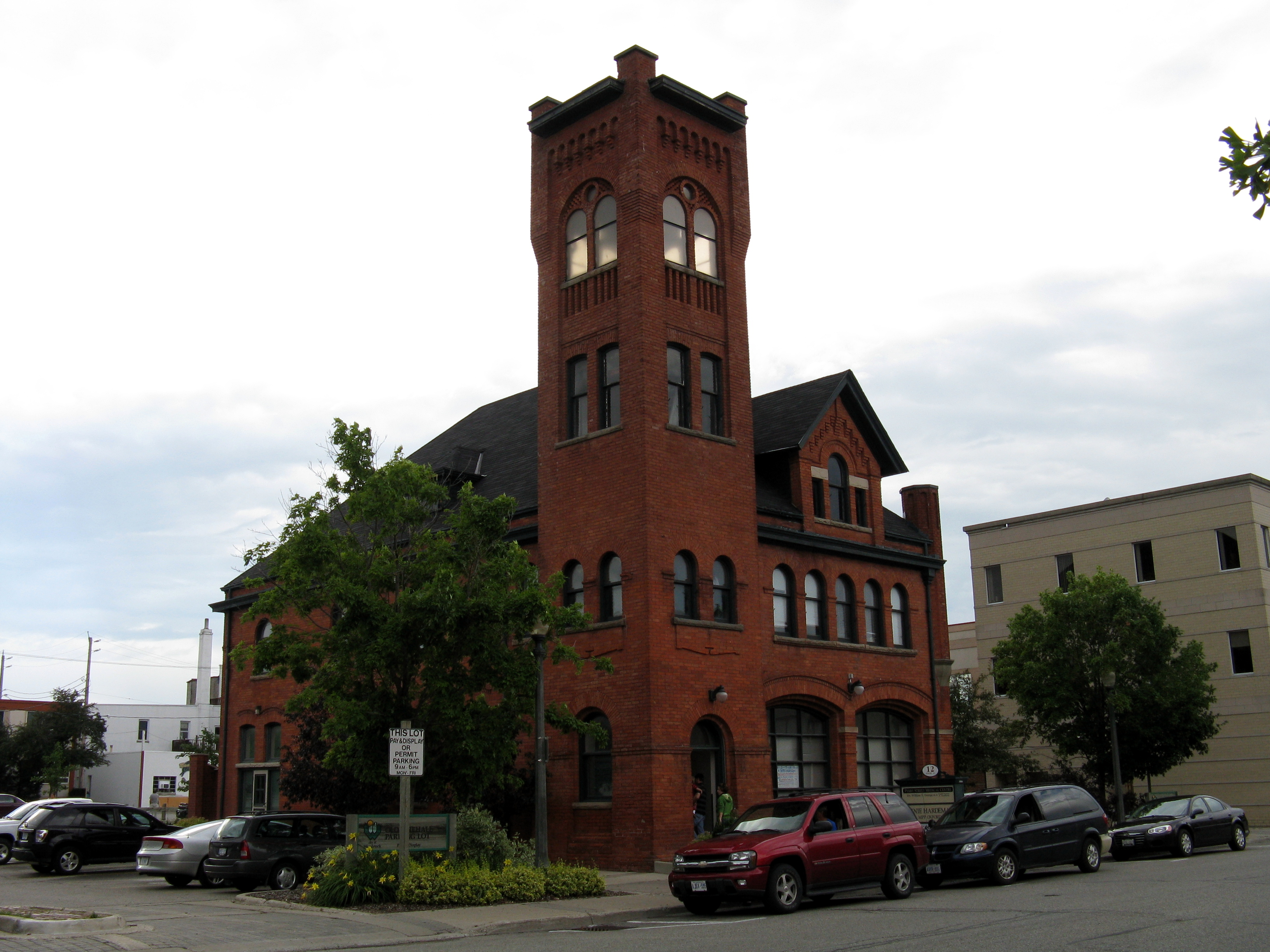
Old Fire Hall, Woodstock

Since Woodstock was first settled in the early 1800s, the city has experienced a rich police history. Early law enforcement in the area was conducted by British military veterans who established a system of law based on their British military background. On 13 May 1865, a by-law was passed to establish a "Town Lock-up", and William Currie, was appointed Chief Constable for the Town of Woodstock. The first Police office and lock up was located in the basement of the present day Woodstock Museum. The Woodstock Police Department continued to grow and by 1875 consisted of a Chief Constable and two Police Constables. On 1 July 1901, Woodstock was incorporated as a City. This placed policing under the control of a Board of Commissioners. A long succession of Chiefs continued to guide the force as it grew in numbers and expertise with the longest serving being Chief Arthur R. Moore who was appointed Chief Constable in 1920 and served for almost 30 years.

In January 1999, the Oxford Community Police Service was formed amalgamating the former Woodstock Police Department, Tavistock Police Service and Township of Norwich Police Service. In addition to the amalgamation of these police services the Oxford Community Police Service assumed the policing responsibilities for the three rural townships of Blandford Blenheim, East Zorra Tavistock, and Norwich. Chief Joe Opthof, Chief Rod Piukkala and Chief Ron Fraser, all served as Chiefs of the Oxford Community Police Service.

However, a few communities such as Ingersoll, Norwich and Tillsonburg were patrolled by the Ontario Provincial Police (OPP) Oxford detachment, with Ingersoll formerly having its own independent police service for many years before merging with the OPP. On 19 October 2009, the Oxford Community Police Service ceased to exist and the Woodstock Police Service was reborn under the direction of Chief Rod Freeman. The rest of Oxford County is patrolled by the Ontario Provincial Police (OPP) Oxford detachment.

In 1999 The Government of Ontario downloaded responsibility for the provision of Land Ambulance Services. In the southern half of the province, the responsibility fell onto Upper Tier Municipalities, such as county or regional governments. Woodstock Ambulance Ltd. and Tillsonburg District Memorial Hospital Ambulance were transferred to the County of Oxford on January 1, 2002, to form Oxford County Paramedic Services. In 2017, Oxford County became the first municipality in Canada to introduce electric hybrid ambulances as part of its Paramedic Services fleet with the purchase of two Crestline Coach Fleetmax XL3 Hybrid ambulances.

== Social issues ==
=== Land use and environmental controls ===
Residents of Ingersoll and surrounding area have been in a militant state of opposition since the announcement in 2012 that the international conglomerate Carmeuse intends to give a 20-year lease to Walker Industries to operate a megadump taking in garbage from Toronto and London to fill the spent portion of the limestone quarry operated by Carmeuse on its nearly 2,000 acres stretching east and north from Ingersoll's eastern boundary. Walker has referenced plans to use the quarry site for a multi-use 'campus' for garbage and recycling operations. Carmeuse has also announced plans to switch to burning garbage in its kilns, which must be heated to 1,000 degrees to process limestone into industrial lime. As a preliminary, it will conduct a pilot Alternative Low-Carbon Fuels ("ALCF") project to assess pollution levels that result from burning 'engineered' garbage to be trucked in from New York state. Long term, ALCF garbage to be burned would include non-recyclable paper and plastic packaging materials, cardboard/paper sludge, non-recyclable rubber and plastic from automotive manufacturing, nylon tire fluff/belting, waste materials from diaper manufacturers, and wood refuse.

Burning garbage in its cement plant kilns is also under study by Lafarge at its branches worldwide. Lafarge and its 1,400 acres north of the Carmeuse lands are not a part of the Walker/Carmeuse garbage landfill/recycling proposal currently in contention, and Oxford County residents are concerned Walker has declined to disclose its future business plans for the quarry sites other than the nearly 200 acre section being made available by Carmeuse along Ingersoll's eastern boundary for which Walker seeks megadump approval.

=== Farm income, labour shortages and production standards ===
Oxford County has approximately 2,000 farms of varying sizes, averaging out to 400 acres per farm. The old saw is heard in Oxford just like elsewhere in the country, 'Canadians don't want to work on farms for the wages offered.' Filling farm labour needs in Oxford County during growing and harvest seasons includes approximately 2,000 foreign seasonal workers. Oxford is still categorized as an 'emerging community' by the Living Wage Canada movement.

=== Connectivity, connectedness and globalisation ===
Due to low population density over most of its territory, Oxford County faced a challenge achieving high-speed internet connectivity for homes and businesses in all areas, but in response to a request for proposals, county council found a contractor able to create a data service network for residents using cellphone tower infrastructure. Internet access has been important to preserving social connectedness as the ongoing process in Oxford of economizing through centralization has caused neighbourhood schools, churches, post offices and businesses to close. Social media has been widely adopted for service delivery by Oxford County council and its various departments.

County residents recognize that quality of life in Oxford is increasingly decided by multinational businesses. When planning on ways to oppose the proposed megadump on the Carmeuse quarry property, the importance of communicating directly with Carmeuse at its head office in Belgium was obvious. Achieving job stability at the CAMI auto assembly plant in Ingersoll required challenging General Motors over threats that the plant's production would be moved to Mexico.

== Education ==
The Thames Valley District School Board operates five high schools in Oxford – three in Woodstock (Huron Park SS, College Avenue SS and Woodstock Collegiate Institute), Glendale High School in Tillsonburg, and Ingersoll District Collegiate Institute in Ingersoll. The London District Catholic School Board operates St. Mary's Catholic High School in Woodstock. The French-language Catholic school board, Providence, operates Ecole Secondaire Catholique Notre-Dame high school in Woodstock. London's Fanshawe College operates a regional campus in Woodstock. Kitchener's Conestoga College has a skills training centre in Ingersoll. Work towards creation of a university in Oxford County continued for several decades in the second half of the 19th century with the creation of the Canadian Literary Institute (incorporated 1857, later renamed Woodstock College) in Woodstock, but came to an end in the late 1880s when its departments were divided and transferred to Toronto and Hamilton to become today's McMaster University.

== See also ==
- 2018 Oxford County municipal elections
- 2014 Oxford County municipal elections
- 2010 Oxford County municipal elections
- Oxford electoral district – provincial elections 1934–present
- Oxford North riding – provincial elections 1867–1930
- Oxford South riding – provincial elections 1867–1930
- Oxford electoral district – federal elections 1935–present
- Oxford North riding – federal elections 1867–1930
- Oxford South riding – federal elections 1867–1934
- List of municipalities in Ontario
- List of Ontario census divisions
- List of townships in Ontario
