= County of Brant Public Library =

Public library system in Ontario, Canada

- Type: Public Library system serving the communities in the County of Brant,
- Established: 1999
- Branches: 5

Collection
- Items collected: books, audio/visual material, magazines, video games, electronic download collections
- Size: 300,000+ items

Other information
- Director: Kelly Bernstein, CEO
- Website: www.brantlibrary.ca

The County of Brant Public Library is the public library system serving the communities in the County of Brant, Ontario, Canada. It has five branches located in Paris, Burford, Scotland, St. George, and Glen Morris.

== Services ==
- Information and reference services
- Access to full text databases
- Community information
- Wireless internet and public computer access
- Readers' advisory services
- Programs for children, teens and adults
- Traditional book, magazine, CD, DVD and video game collections
- Download collections including eBooks, audiobooks, music, movies, tv shows, and digital magazines
- Visiting Books services
- Meeting room rentals

== History of the County of Brant Libraries ==
The central branch of the County of Brant system is located in Paris, Ontario. In 1999, Paris and its surrounding areas amalgamated to form the County of Brant. Before that time each community was served by its own separate library.

=== Paris ===
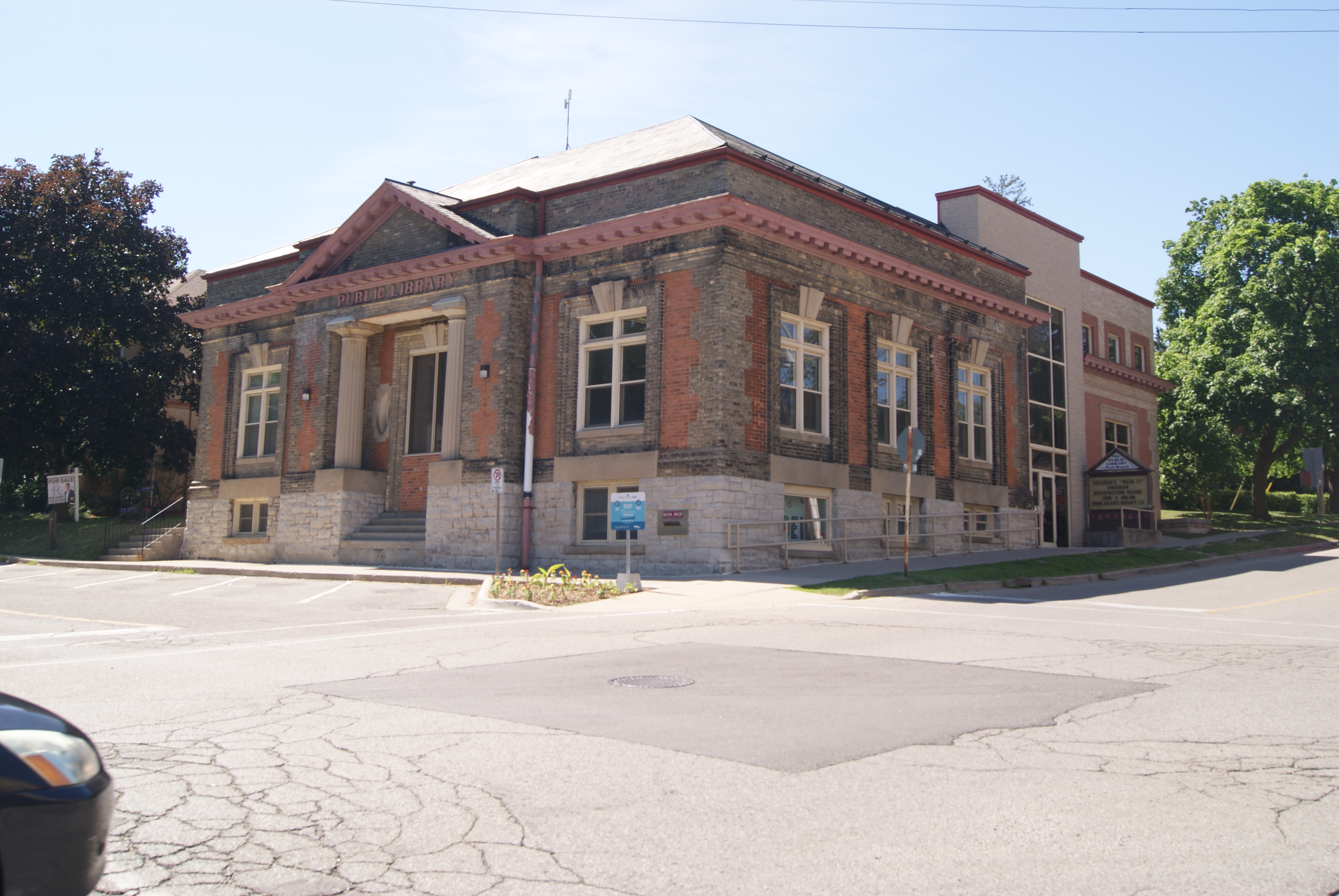
Paris branch, a Carnegie library.

In 1841 Hiram Capron, founder of Paris and twenty-five residents formed the Paris Mutual Institute for the purpose of Lectures, Circulating Library and Scientific experiments. Later that year the name was changed to the Paris Mechanics' Institute so that the organization could apply for government grants. In 1858 Paris' first public library was established when a lot located at 7 Grand River Street North in Paris was purchased from Hiram Capron for $150. The Paris library then expanded after receiving a Carnegie grant in 1902 and the new free public library was located at 12 William Street, where the library remains today. The branch was renovated and expanded again in 1995.

=== Scotland-Oakland ===
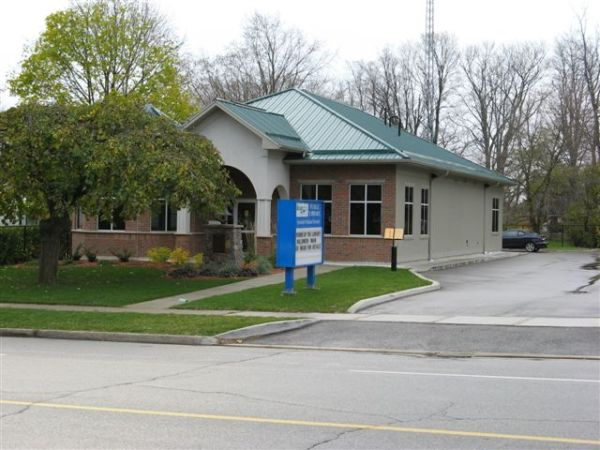
Scotland-Oakland branch

The Scotland-Oakland branch of the library system is located at 281 Oakland Road, Scotland, Ontario. The branch has been at its current location since March 2005. Before that time the Scotland library enjoyed a long history in its community: a small library opened its doors to the public in 1894. In 1910 the librarian sold the building to the Scotland Library Trustees for $125; the cost of a library card in 1911 was 50 cents for the first card and 25 cents for the next. By 1938 the library had a home in a white frame building with a town bell on its roof which served as a fire alarm for the residents of Scotland. On October 10, 1967 under By-law No. 844 "To Establish a Township Public Library", Scotland Library became the Oakland Township Public Library. In 1973 the Oakland Township Library purchased a house which was converted into the library and opened in 1974. Twenty years later the bell from the original building was unveiled to commemorate 100 years of library service in Scotland. When the County of Brant amalgamated in 1999 the Oakland Library joined its system; in 2005 a brand new facility was unveiled with the name Scotland-Oakland Branch.

=== Burford ===
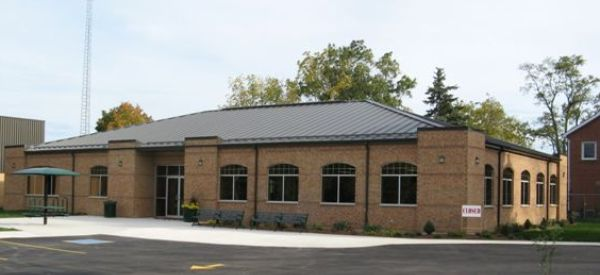
Burford branch

The current Burford branch, located at 24 Park Avenue, Burford, Ontario, opened its doors in 2007. It is the county's second largest branch at almost 6,000 sq ft (560 m^{2}). The Burford community has had a long library history, with its first public library created in the 1890s. The library closed in 1910 and was not formerly reopened until 1966 as the Burford Public Library. This library, located on King Street East in Burford, became part of Ontario's South Central Regional Library system. In 1999 Burford amalgamated with the new County of Brant, and a new branch was built and opened in October 2007.

=== St. George ===
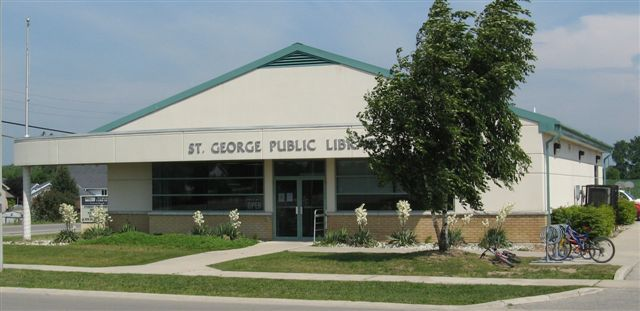
St. George branch

The St. George branch was first formed in 1878 as a Mechanics' Institute and was housed in the back room of their association hall. In 1893 the local newspaper reported that there were 3000 titles in the collection and that over 2300 loans were enacted that year. It moved to new quarters behind the post office in the new century and joined with the Glen Morris library, the only other library in the county, to form the South Dumfries Public Library. The library went into severe decline between the two World Wars, thought to be caused by the Depression, and it took a concerted effort by a number of the towns people to resurrect its collection. Plays were produced in the town's Memorial Hall to raise funds for new books. This became a yearly event for some time. St. George and Glen Morris retained that name until the amalgamation of Brant County in 1999; at about this time the branch moved from its old location to its new spot at 78 Main Street North.

=== Glen Morris ===
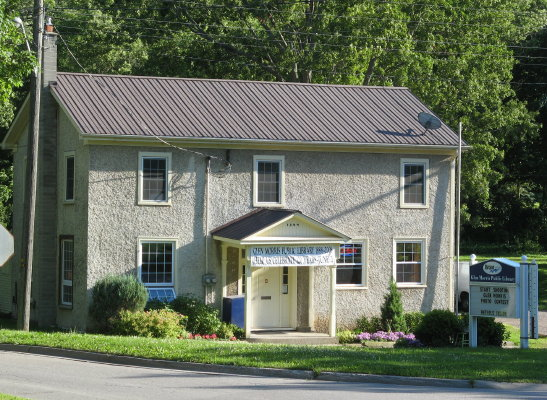
Glen Morris branch

The Glen Morris Branch is located at 474 East River Road, Glen Morris, Ontario. In 1875 a Penny Reading Society was founded in Glen Morris to provide entertainment and education during the long winter months. In February 1888 the funds of the society were transferred to a Mechanics' Institute. The Institute ran until 1910 when it was changed to a public library under the Provincial Library Act. In 1966 the library in Glen Morris became part of the township library system, then in 1967 joined the newly designed regional system which increased circulation from over 2000 books in 1966 to over 8000 books in 1967. In 1971 the library was renovated by volunteers. In 1999 with the amalgamation of the County of Brant, the Glen Morris Library became part of the County of Brant Public Library. The library still exists in its original location, though the back room, previously administrative offices, is now rented as an apartment.

== See also ==
- Ask Ontario
- Ontario Public Libraries
