= Green Energy Hub =

Sustainable energy region in Ontario, Canada

The Green Energy Hub is an energy program covering a region in the Canadian province of Ontario that extends as far west as Port Rowan, as far north as Paris, as far east as Dunnville, and as far south as Lake Erie. Counties covered by the "Green Energy Hub" include Brant County, Haldimand County and Norfolk County.

As a result of the initiatives in the Green Energy Hub, the air in the region became cleaner between the years 2000 and 2010. However, increasing levels of greenhouse gases from automobiles has affected this negatively. Simcoe, an important community located in the Green Energy Hub, is assessed to be 25 times less likely to face a major smog disaster when compared to major metropolitan cities like London, Windsor, and Sarnia due to embracing environmental programs in its area.

Employers that come to the "Green Energy Hub" area can be linked to solar power panels and the collection of water from rain. Hundreds of millions of dollars are being spent in Norfolk County to assure a "greener" world for its residents. It is hoped that Research and development jobs will emerge in the hub, replacing low-technology jobs that were eliminated in the 2000s due to the rising cost of labor. The purpose of the Green Energy Hub program is to stop the exploitation of natural resources and tackle climate change.

At least 60% of unemployed people in the "Green Energy Hub" area are under the age of 30. People in the area tend to have to go to larger cities such as Hamilton, Windsor and Toronto in order to find well-paying jobs that allow them to support a household. While manufacturing jobs have disappeared from the local area within the past 20 years, there are promising careers in construction and a variety of technical vocations that may attract current Green Energy Hub residents to the Hamilton area.

Approximately 50,000 green collar jobs may be created, possibly replacing blue collar jobs. Land in Ontario that is traditionally for agricultural use may be affected by the "Green Energy Hub" program." This hub may become the central component in the sustainable energy grid of the future.

== Economic recovery ==
2,600 people officially joined the Norfolk County workforce between June 2012 and June 2013. Businesses have been expanding throughout Norfolk County again; often hiring people two at a time. Innovative business running measures are also improving the quality of life for Norfolk County residents who are members of the workforce. The economy of the Greater Toronto Area may become further interconnected with the changed brought about by the "Green Energy Hub".

However, economic recovery has been complicated somewhat by Norfolk County banning the building of new wind turbines. One of the council members was worried about Norfolk County becoming "industrialized" and "unnatural." Many leaders in Norfolk County envision the surrounding area as being an agricultural hub for Southern Ontario even by the middle of the 22nd century.
