= Carolinian forest =

Life zone in eastern North America

The Carolinian forest refers to a life zone in eastern North America characterized primarily by the predominance of deciduous (broad-leaf) forest. The term "Carolinian", which is most commonly used in Canada, refers to the deciduous forests which span much of the eastern United States from North Carolina northward into southern Ontario, Canada. These deciduous forests in the United States and southern Ontario share many similar characteristics and species, hence their association. Today, the term is often used to refer to the Canadian portion (northern limit) of the deciduous forest region, while the portion in the United States is often referred to as the "Eastern deciduous forest".

== Location and extent ==
The Carolinian zone spans across much of the eastern United States, with extensive coverage in the Virginias, Kentucky, Tennessee, Maryland, Delaware, Pennsylvania, parts of southern New York state, Connecticut, and Rhode Island, eastern Ohio, and small parts of southern Michigan, Indiana, and western Ohio. It extends up into Southern Ontario, Canada which is located in the fertile ecozone of the Mixedwood Plains and includes ecodistricts 7E-1 to 7E-6.

Trees found here include various species of ash, birch, chestnut, hickory, oak, and walnut; tallest of all is the tulip tree. Fruit trees native to this zone include the pawpaw. Animal life includes raccoons, opossums, squirrels (including the relatively rare southern flying squirrel), nuthatches, and chickadees. The Carolinian forest is among the most biologically diverse regions in Canada, with over 2,200 plant species, 400 bird species, and more than half of the country's at-risk species.

== Carolinian Canada ==
The Carolinian forest in Canada is located at the southern tip of Ontario between Lake Erie, Lake Huron and Lake Ontario. The region contains an extremely high biodiversity of species, over 500 of which are considered rare. Research in the Carolinian zone has shown that many rare vascular plants are concentrated on specific landforms and within protected areas, showing the importance of conserving key landscape features of this region.

=== Rare plants and biodiversity significance ===
The Canadian portion of the Carolinian forest supports an unusually high concentration of rare vascular plant species compared with other regions of the country.

Research on plant distributions in southern Ontario has shown that many uncommon species are clustered on landforms such as sand plains and other specialized habitats. Protected natural areas play an important role in conserving these species, as a significant proportion of documented rare plant occurrences have been recorded within parks and reserves. Examples of rare or regionally significant plant species include Asimina triloba (pawpaw), Sassfras albidum (sassafras), and Opuntia humifusa (eastern prickly pear cactus), which occur in scattered populations in Carolinian Canada.

=== Climate pressures ===
The reason for the high biodiversity in this region is its unique climate, ranging from humid subtropical to a mild humid continental. The Carolinian forest of Ontario has the warmest average annual temperatures, the longest frost-free seasons, and the mildest winters of any region in Ontario and Canada in general. This distinctive climate is largely due to the nearby Great Lakes which moderate the temperature of the surrounding land. Climate records show that the Carolinian region, as part of the Great Lakes-St. Lawrence basin has already warmed over the past century, with the largest increases occurring in winter and spring. This warming is associated with longer growing seasons and changing precipitation patterns that affect forest water balance and ecosystem processes. The climate of the region is strongly influenced by the Great Lakes, so even relatively small shifts in temperature and evaporation can alter habitat conditions in Carolinian forests.

Projected climate change may further influence forest composition and resilience in southern Ontario by increasing stress on some common tree species and shaping management responses in both urban and natural landscapes. Natural disturbance patterns such as wildfire in the broader Great Lakes-St. Lawrence Forest is also shaped by interactions among climate variability, short-term weather conditions, and landscape characteristics.

=== Status ===
Extensive agriculture and urban development have substantially altered the original Carolinian forest landscape.

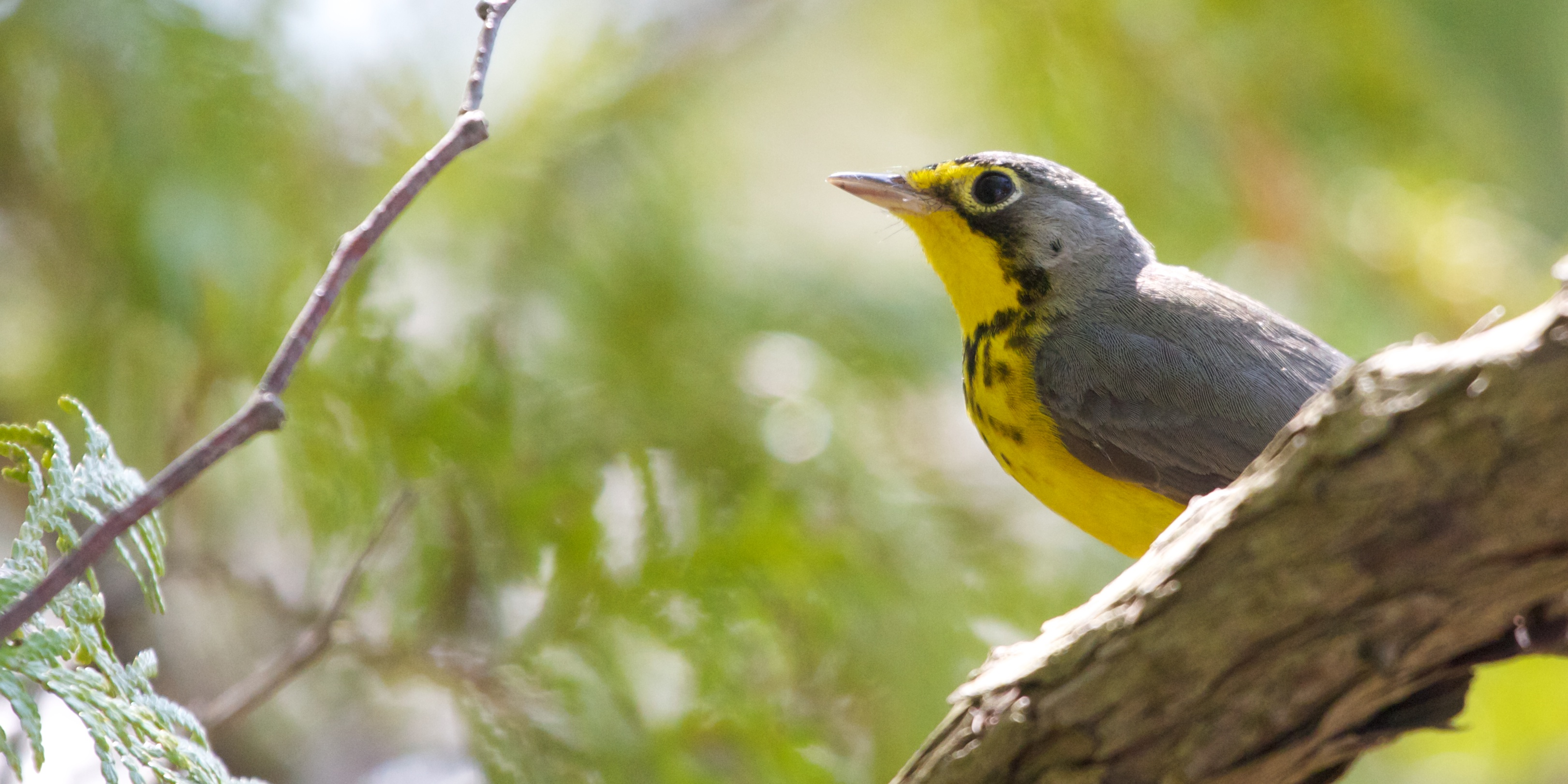
Canada warbler (Cardellina canadensis) who use the Carolinian forests as their breeding grounds.A southern flying squirrel (Glaucomys volans) in the branches of a red maple tree.

The high fertility of the land has seen the region become highly developed and populated, with agricultural, industrial, commercial and urban areas. Today, the Carolinian Zone contains major cities and is home to one quarter of Canada's population despite being 0.25% of the total land area. The deforestation of the region for this development has led to significant habitat loss and fragmentation, leaving the remaining portions of land scattered and disconnected, with some areas still threatened by human development. In total, it is estimated that forest cover has been reduced from 80% to 11.3% while wetlands have been reduced from 28.3% to 5.1%. Habitat fragmentation can also reduce ecological connectivity and increase the long-term vulnerability of species by limiting dispersal between forest patches and altering ecosystem processes. Surveys of the remaining woodlands in southern Ontario have found notable surviving examples of several at-risk Carolinian tree species, highlighting the conservation value of mature forest stands.

=== Threats ===
Major ecological pressures in the Carolinian zone include habitat fragmentation, herbivory, invasive species, disease, and emerging environmental change.

==== Deer and invasive plants ====
In addition to habitat loss and fragmentation, the native Carolinian species are also being threatened by invasive species such as garlic mustard and buckthorn, and overgrazing by white-tailed deer. Invasive species are a major threat to the wetland ecosystems, which are home to over half of the non-fish species at risk (SAR) in the defined Carolinian Canada boundary.High densities of white-tailed deer can suppress forest regeneration by repeatedly browsing tree seedlings, reducing their growth and shifting species towards browse-tolerant plants. Experimental studies in hardwood forests have shown that increasing deer densities can reduce tree seedling growth, lower plant species richness, and alter vegetation development toward browsing-resistant species.

Vegetation impacts increase with deer density and become evident at densities above roughly 8 deer/km^{2}, with long-term browsing pressure reducing understory diversity. Research in Southern Ontario suggests that even when seedlings survive browsing, their reduced size may limit long-term canopy replacement if pressure remains high. Field studies in southern Ontario urban forests have also shown that deer browsing interacting with invasive plants such as garlic mustard can influence native seedling survival and regeneration patterns.

Invasive garlic mustard often co-occurs with deer in Carolinian forests, and although its effects vary by species, its presence has been associated with changes to native seedling performance. Recent work in old-growth Carolinian forests indicates that deer activity can also influence recovery indirectly by altering soil nutrient conditions and understory vegetation structure.

==== Pathogens ====
Introduced pathogens are an additional concern; in Southern Ontario, endangered eastern flowering dogwood (Cornus florida) has been heavily affected by dogwood anthracnose caused by the fungus Discula destructiva. Dogwood anthracnose is a highly damaging fungal disease that has caused severe mortality in natural populations of C. florida and related species across Eastern North America. Studies of dogwood anthracnose have documented severe mortality and demographic changes in populations of eastern flowering dogwood across parts of eastern North America. Ecological and genetic research in the Canadian Carolinian forest has confirmed continued susceptibility of endangered dogwood populations to infection by the introduced pathogen Discula destructiva.

Another invasive fungal disease affecting Carolinian tree species is butternut canker, caused by Ophiognomonia clavigignenti-juglandacearum. Since the late 1960s, the disease has spread across nearly the entire North American range of butternut (Juglans cinerea), causing widespread mortality that often exceeds 70% in affected regions. The pathogen spreads through rain, insect vectors, and infected seed, allowing for rapid movement between fragmented forests and contributing to the endangered status of butternut in Canada.

==== Island disturbance ====
On some islands in the Great Lakes, large nesting colonies of double-crested cormorants have been linked to noticeable changes in vegetation cover and soil chemistry. Long-term monitoring has also documented shifts in island habitat conditions over time associated with continued cormorant nesting activity.

==== Emerging disease ecology ====
Habitat characteristics and environmental conditions have been shown to influence the survival and distribution of black-legged ticks in parts of southeastern Canada. Tick-borne parasites such as Babesia odocoilei have also been detected in ticks collected in southern Ontario, suggesting emerging wildlife disease concerns in ecosystems that include the Carolinian zone.

These factors have contributed to the Carolinian zone becoming the most threatened region in Ontario, with over 125 species of plants and animals listed as either vulnerable, threatened or endangered by the federal or provincial governments. This is over one-third of all vulnerable, threatened or endangered species in Canada.

=== Conservation efforts ===
Some parts of the remaining natural area in the Carolinian zone are protected in an effort to conserve the region and its unique, diverse biota. For example, today there are many protected areas including Point Pelee National Park, 21 provincial parks, and many conservation areas. Some of the best preserved areas of Canada's Carolinian forest are located in Windsor's Ojibway Prairie Complex and Rondeau Provincial Park near Morpeth, Ontario; another is the Niagara Glen Nature Reserve near Niagara Falls, Ontario. There are also organizations like the Carolinian Canada Coalition who aim to restore the region as much as possible. Carolinian forests are complex ecosystems that cannot be replicated in gardens or other small areas. The only way to preserve this unique habitat is continue to keep larger areas of land protected from development and agriculture.

Long-term restoration research in southwestern Ontario shows that previously disturbed forests can gradually develop understory plant communities that resemble those of less-disturbed reference forests, especially when restoration occurs near existing natural woodland. Regional conservation planning has also focused on improving ecological connectivity and encouraging stewardship across the Carolinian landscape. A regional planning framework known as the "Big Picture" approach maps large core natural areas and corridors intended to reconnect fragmented forests and wetland. The approach is based on the idea that small isolated habitats cannot support many forest-dependent species over long periods, and that reconnecting landscapes improves ecologically stability.

Other conservation efforts have included the reduction of the white-tailed deer population from their peak density of 55 deer km^{−2} to 7 deer km^{−2,} between the years of 1996-2009. However, studies have found that while this helps reduce further forest damage, continued decline in the forest canopy can still occur, indicating the recovery from overgrazing by herbivores on the forest canopy is a long process without immediate results. Maintaining a lower density of white-tailed deer, while increasing the seed sources of native trees and protecting tree saplings in herbivore exclosures are all suggested ways of helping the Carolinian forest recover or at least conserve what is remaining.

In addition to ecological restoration and landscape planning, conservation efforts in the Carolinian region have also involved public education and stewardship initiatives aimed at increasing awareness and support for habitat protection. Management of protected areas has not always been straightforward and debates around parks such as Rondeau Provincial Park showing the long-standing challenges of balancing recreation, development pressures, and conservation goals in this densely populated region.

== Examples of species ==
Fauna:

- White-tailed deer
- American black bear
- Virginia opossum
- American badger
- Gray fox
- Bobcat
- Southern flying squirrel
- Wild turkey
- Ruffed grouse
- Hooded warbler
- Prothonotary warbler
- Canada warbler
- Carolina wren
- Yellow-breasted chat
- Northern cardinal
- Red bellied woodpecker
- Red-tailed hawk
- American barn owl
- Passenger pigeon (formerly)
- Carolina parakeet (formerly)
- Eastern box turtle
- Spotted turtle
- Eastern hognose snake
- Eastern spiny softshell turtle
- Eastern fox snake
- Red salamander
- Karner blue butterfly

Flora:

- Eastern prickly pear cactus
- Butternut
- Tulip tree
- Sassafras
- Miami mist
- Pawpaw
- Kentucky coffeetree
- Flowering dogwood
- Black walnut
- American chestnut
- American sycamore
- Red mulberry
- Black gum
- Red maple
- Eastern white pine
- Eastern hemlock
- Honey locust

== Rivers and creeks ==
- Ausable River
- Catfish Creek
- Credit River
- Kettle Creek
- Grand River
- Rouge River
- Sydenham River
- Thames River
- Twenty Mile Creek
- Welland River
- Nith River

== Other ==
- Rouge Park
- Barker's Bush
- Point Pelee National Park

== See also ==
- Temperate broadleaf and mixed forests
- Southern Great Lakes forests
