= John Penman =

Canadian businessman

John Penman (ca. 1845-1931) was a founder of the Penman mill, which grew into a large, multi-factory operation in Ontario during the late nineteenth and early twentieth century.

== Personal life ==
John Penman was born in New York City (c.1845) to Daniel and Clementina Penman. All are buried in family plot in Greenwood Cemetery, Brooklyn, NY. John Penman of Penman Mills, Paris, Ontario, married Martha McVicar. Martha is buried in the Paris Cemetery. In 1868 John Penman moved to Paris, Ontario, where he founded a new mill with W.E. Adams. The company was incorporated as the Penman Manufacturing Company Limited in 1882.

John Penman also helped to found the Central School at Paris, was a patron of the Y.M.C.A., and helped to establish buildings for that organization at Paris, Ontario, and Hankow, China. He was a member of the Presbyterian Church and was on the board of administration and Senate of Knox College.

== Penmarvian ==
John Penman’s home, Penmarvian, was originally called Riverview Hall and was built by the founder of Paris Hiram Capron in 1845. At the time it was a modest two storey building overlooking the Grand River and it stayed that way until 1887 when Penman purchased the home and began an ambitious plan to turn the building into what we now recognize as Penmarvian with all of its glorious and extensive arrays of turrets, towers and arches. When Penman died in 1931, he willed the home along with an operating budget to the local Presbyterian Church for use as a retirement residence for church clergy.
