= Barker's Bush =

Coordinates: 43°11′35″N 80°23′50″W

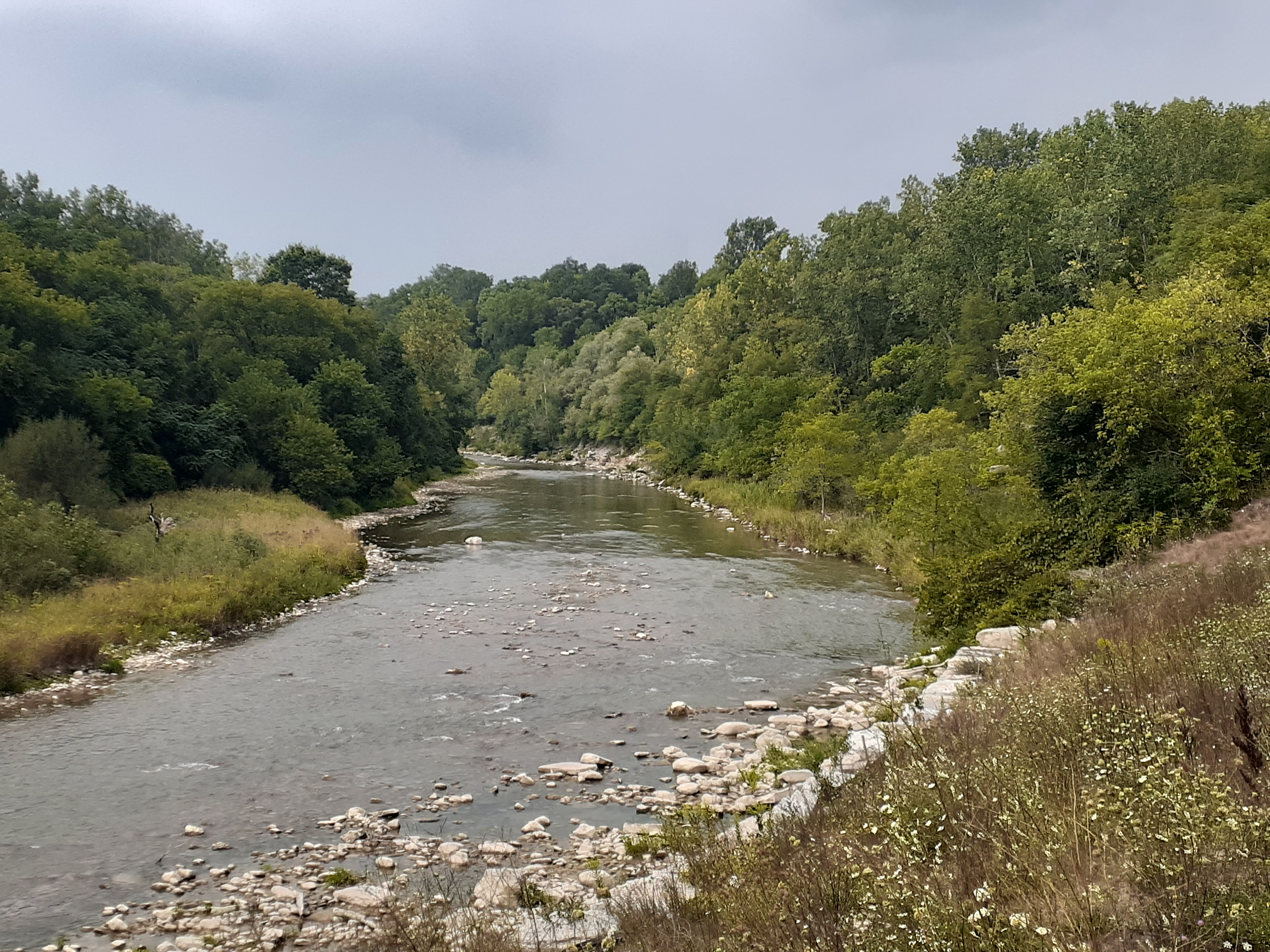
The Nith River flowing through Barker's Bush

Barker's Bush is a forest located in the Grand River watershed near the banks of the Nith River in the community of Paris, County of Brant, Ontario, Canada. The bush is directly north and west of Lion's Park, and less than one kilometre northwest of the confluence of the Nith and the Grand rivers.

Consisting of a mix of both coniferous and deciduous trees common to the Carolinian forests of southwestern Ontario, the bush itself is riddled with extensive bike and hiking trails which are used frequently, especially so through the warmer months (typically late Spring through early Fall).

The vast majority of Barkers Bush historically has been located on private property, however, trespassing has generally been accepted and the public has used the trails extensively for many years. Historically, the only public land entrance to the bush was through Lion's Park, however, this changed in 2002 when the local municipality built a steel footbridge from the east banks of the Nith to the west banks located in the bush itself.

In 2016 Losani Homes purchased the agricultural fields in which Barkers Bush surrounds to develop a new subdivision, as well as some of the forest itself. In response the County of Brant bought roughly 100 acres of Barkers Bush in 2019 to preserve the rest of the forest and trails within it.

The skeletal remains of the river dam found at the southeastern edge of the bush are a relic from an era when shipping traffic was common on the Nith.
