= Drag Brunch Saved My Life =

- Created by: Priyanka; Daniel Birnbaum
- Directed by: Cheryl Zalameda; Matt Hoos
- Starring: Priyanka; Crystal Westland; Mitchell Bright
- No. of episodes: 8

Production
- Executive producers: Bruno Dube, Marlo Miazga, Kim Bondi, and Corinna Lehr
- Production companies: Sphere Productions, Bell Media

Original release
- Network: Crave
- Release: May 2, 2025

Drag Brunch Saved My Life is a Canadian drag makeover reality television series which follows Canadian drag queen Priyanka as she goes to different restaurants in Ontario and gives them a makeover culminating in a drag brunch performance. The series premiered on Crave on May 2, 2025.

== Production ==
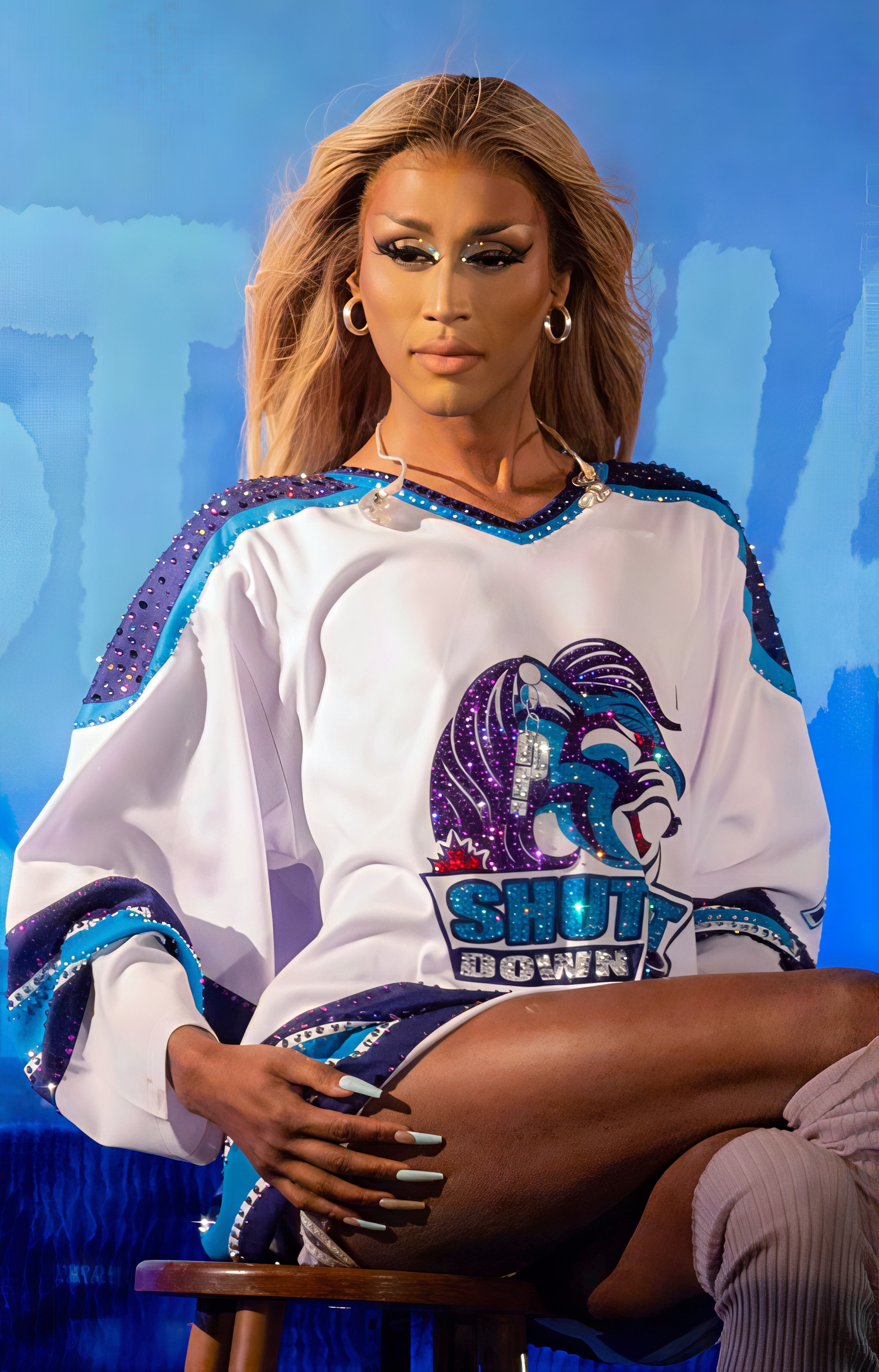
Priyanka in 2024

The series was officially announced in June 2024 by Bell Media as part of their 2024-2025 slate of original programming.

The series was co-created by Priyanka and Daniel Birnbaum. The series is produced by Sphere Media in association with Bell Media. Casting for the series concluded in July 2024.

The series premiered on May 2, 2025, with three episodes released that day and one episode released per week for the next five weeks.

== Cast and locations ==
Priyanka serves as the host of the series, with support from interior designer Crystal Westland, chef Mitchell Bright, and drag performers Lemon, Tynomi Banks, and Xtacy Love. Westland is the owner of Toronto home decor shop Avenue Daughter, and Bright is a chef, food stylist and food content creator on social media platforms.

Lemon and Tynomi Banks appear in one episode each, with Xtacy Love, Priyanka's drag mother, appearing in the other six.

Locations featured in the series include:

- Cosmo's Diner in Thorold, ON
- Town & Country Steakhouse in Barrie, ON
- Bloom Bistro in Barrie, ON
- YOU Made it Cafe in London, ON
- The Smokin’ 116 Bistro in Belleville, ON
- Deja Vu Diner in Orangeville, ON
- The Alpine in Toronto, ON
- The Library Bar in Paris, ON

Cosmo's Diner was forced to close around the time of the episode airing, due to owner Karen Brookes having been diagnosed with pancreatic cancer. However, Brookes praised the experience of filming the show as a wonderful and emotionally healing experience, which did give her a period of increased local business in the months between the event in August 2024 and her diagnosis.

Three of the local drag performers who appeared in the auditions — Dulce, Karamilk and Star Doll — subsequently appeared in the sixth season of Canada's Drag Race.

== Format ==
Priyanka first visits the restaurant on her own to meet the restaurant's owner and staff and taste a sample of the restaurant menu. She then returns the following day with the "P-Team", designer Crystal Westland and chef Mitchell Bright, for a more thorough observation of the restaurant's clientele and food preparation and service processes; they subsequently return to present their initial plans, with Westland presenting two design options for the restaurateurs to choose from, and Bright presenting a simplified brunch menu of four or five dishes from which the restaurateurs can choose one "signature" dish for him to elevate further with a special new recipe.

Priyanka then returns with the guest drag queen, working with the restaurateurs to audition local drag performers for the brunch; Priyanka and the guest queen offer feedback and input based on their drag experience, but the choice of performers is also ultimately left up to the restaurateurs. Both drag queens and drag kings are eligible to audition in this phase.

In most episodes, the P-Team also identify operational issues, such as suboptimal staff communication processes or unresolved emotions around business or personal struggles, that may be interfering with the restaurant's success, and provide advice to the owners on how to improve their operations in the future.

The final preparations to set up the brunch are then depicted, following which the brunch is staged. Priyanka also performs as a special guest at each brunch.

== Episodes ==
No. overall	No. in season	Title	Original release date
1	1	"Bloom Bistro, Barrie, ON"	May 2, 2025
Nalini, a restaurateur in Barrie, Ontario, has struggled to recover her bistro's image in the community after a disastrous Mother's Day when she and her team became overwhelmed by the number of customers and left many people deeply dissatisfied with the service.
2	2	"Town & Country Steakhouse, Barrie ON"	May 2, 2025
Steve, who is still running the steakhouse opened and operated by his parents when he was a child, still caters to the same clientele his parents had, but struggles to bring in new customers due to the establishment's reputation as a restaurant for grandparents.
3	3	"Cosmo’s Diner, Thorold ON"	May 2, 2025
Cosmo's Diner is a longtime community fixture in Thorold, but owner Karen is barely breaking even anymore as people have become much more likely to talk about their memories of eating there in the past than to actually go eat there now.
4	4	"YOU Made it Café, London ON"	May 9, 2025
YOU (Youth Opportunities Unlimited) Made It, a café which operates as an employment training program for disadvantaged and at-risk youth in London, Ontario, wants to expand awareness of the program in the city.
5	5	"The 116 Smokin’ Bistro, Belleville ON"	May 16, 2025
The 116 Smokin' Bistro in Belleville has several successful events in the evening, including live bands and stand-up comedy nights, but struggles to bring in daytime customers.
6	6	"Deja Vu Diner, Orangeville ON"	May 23, 2025
Deja Vu Diner in Orangeville experienced a burst of popularity a couple of years ago after popular Canadian food TikToker Joseph DeBenedictis released a video raving about its cinnamon bun pancakes, but business has since levelled off. Owner Jenn, a community figure so beloved that even the mayor of Orangeville is a regular customer, thinks a drag brunch may be the way to bring in weekend business again, as well as a way to show support and love to her lesbian daughter.
7	7	"The Alpine, Toronto ON"	May 30, 2025
The Alpine, a restaurant in Toronto's The Junction neighbourhood, once staged a successful drag brunch but its followup attempts to repeat the event failed, and the team has to show them what they can do differently to make it more successful.
8	8	"The Library Bar, Paris ON"	June 6, 2025
The historic Arlington Hotel in Paris, Ontario, is now being managed by a new, younger team than in the past; however, while they've had some success revitalizing the hotel's bar with a weekly trivia night, some of the other events they inherited from the former owners, including a high tea, aren't bringing in customers anymore, and they want to replace it with new events appealing to a younger clientele.

== Awards ==
Association	Year	Category	Recipient	Result	Ref.
Canadian Cinema Editors Awards	2026	Best Editing in Lifestyle	Peter Topalovic & Ken Yan, "Bloom Bistro, Barrie ON"	Pending	
Canadian Screen Awards	2026	Best Lifestyle Program or Series	Mark "Priyanka" Suknanan, Daniel Birnbaum, Justin Stockman, Bruno Dubé, Marlo Miazga, Kim Bondi, Corinna Lehr	Won	
Canadian Screen Awards	2026	Best Host in a Lifestyle Program or Series	Priyanka	Won	
Canadian Screen Awards	2026	Best Production Design/Art Direction in a Non-Fiction Program or Series	Crystal Westland, Andy Roskaft	Nominated	
