= Oakland, Ontario =

Oakland, Ontario may refer to:

- Oakland, Brant County, Ontario
- Oakland, Essex County, Ontario
