= Middleport =

The place name Middleport may refer to:

Canada

- Middleport, Ontario

United Kingdom,

- Middleport, Staffordshire in England

United States

- Middleport, New York
- Middleport, Ohio
- Middleport, Pennsylvania
- Middleport, Wisconsin
