= Arlington Hotel (Paris, Ontario) =

Historic hotel in Paris, Ontario

The Arlington Hotel
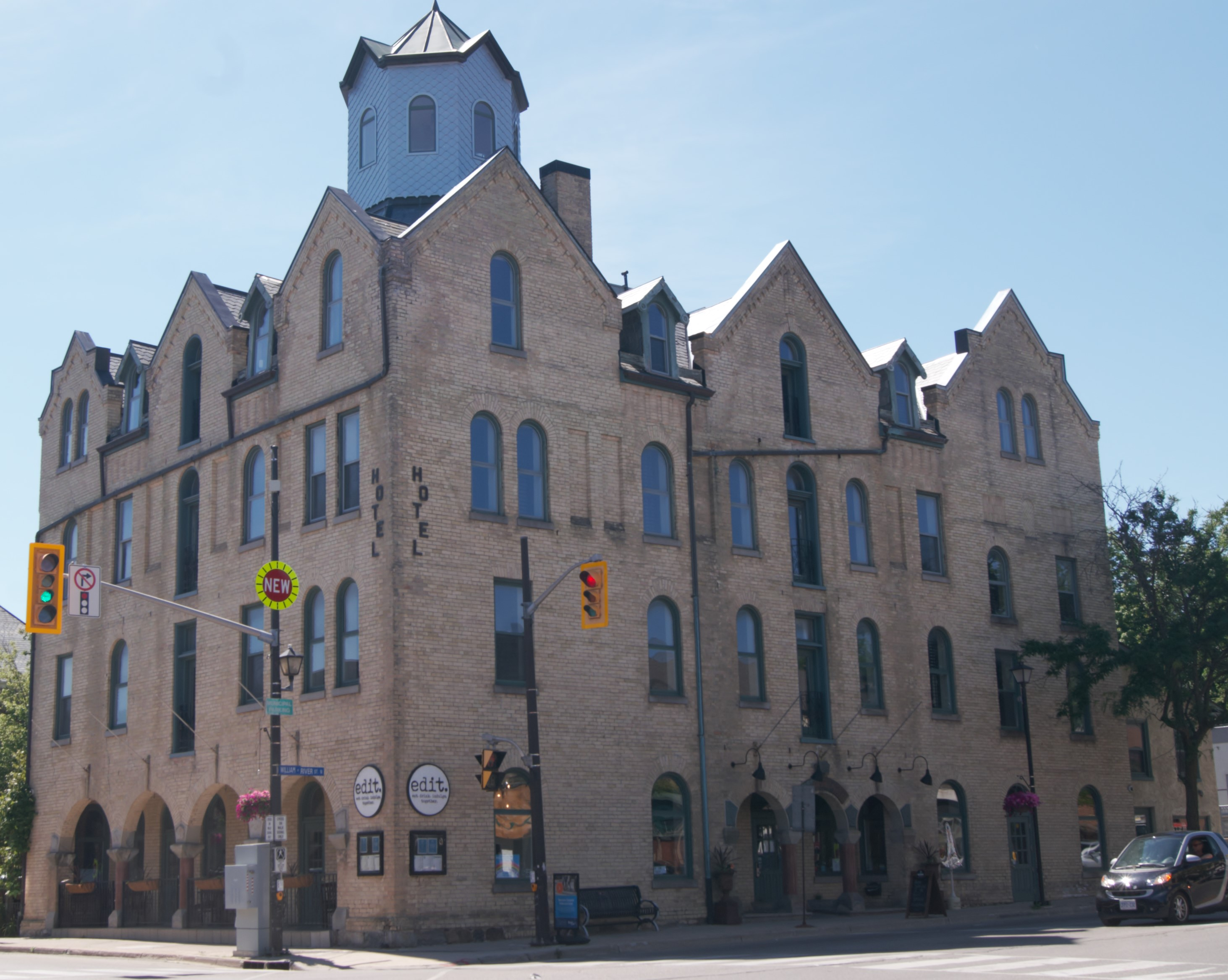
- Seen from the corner of William Street and Grand River Street North

- Location within Ontario

General information
- Location: Paris, Ontario, 106 Grand River Street North
- Coordinates: 43.1941°N 80.3848°W
- Opening: c. 1851

Technical details
- Floor count: 5

Design and construction
- Developer: O.D. Bradford

Other information
- Number of rooms: 24
- Number of suites: 4
- Number of restaurants: 1
- Parking: Yes

Website
- www.arlingtonhotel.ca

The Arlington Hotel is a historic hotel in Paris, Ontario. Built in the early 1850s by O.B. Bradford, it was first known as the Bradford House/Hotel. The Ealand family, who took over the house in 1882 after O.B. Bradford's sudden death, and renamed it the Arlington.

The hotel was the site of many important social occasions, including the farewell gathering in 1940 for the first group of Paris soldiers before their departure overseas during the Second World War, which was chaired by Mayor J. P. McCammon.

The hotel underwent many ownership changes through the years. In the mid-90s the hotel was bought and renovated before closing in the mid-2000s. In 2014 the hotel was bought by a group of owners who renovated the hotel and restaurant. The restaurant was re-opened as "The Forks at the Arlington", a tribute to Paris being the fork of the Grand and Nith Rivers. The hotel now boasts three eateries: (formerly Woolfe & Wilde, and The Forks at the Arlington), 1851 Public House, and The Library Bar at The Arlington, as well as River's Edge, an events hall across the street overlooking the Grand River.

The hotel was recognized as an Ontario Heritage Site on May 15, 1990.

== History ==
The Bradford House was built in the early 1850s by O.B. Bradford, an immigrant from Pennsylvania. Mr. Bradford owned the hotel until his death in May, 1882. The hotel was then owned by a Mr. Ealand who planned to open a sulfur spring spa. Unfortunately, the water turned brown due to rusting pipes. He also added an extension hotel and ran the hotel until his death in 1901.

The hotel was then leased to a Mr. Cornish from 1901 to 1925 until the hotel was once again operated by the Ealand family. It was operated by Eva Ealand until 1956 and then Herbert Ealand until 1962. Herbert Ealand sold the hotel to William J. Ferguson. Ferguson became a councilor in Paris and made improvements to the hotel before selling it in 1967. The hotel was bought by Torontonians George Lookers and Art McGill, who sold the hotel later that year.

The hotel was then bought by Bob and Rae Anderson, who ran the hotel from 1969 to 1972. In 1972 the hotel was sold to Michael Perdue, who ran it until late 1983 when it was bought by Adrian Parker. Parker, after attempting renovations, sold the building to Athanasios Soliriow.

In 1988 Edward Brokhusens sold the hotel to brothers Joe and John Skupnik. In 1998 the brothers completely renovated the hotel and reopened it in 2000.

The hotel was closed again in the mid-2000s, only to be bought and renovated again by Nils Foss, reopening to the public in June 2014.

The hotel changed hands in June 2016, over to The Other Bird partnership of Erin Dunham and Matthew Kershaw. The Arlington has once again been renovated with 24 literary-themed rooms.

In 2022 The Other Bird sold the hotel to Carmen's Group, a hospitality company based in Hamilton.

In 2025, the hotel was featured in an episode of the reality television series Drag Brunch Saved My Life, with host Priyanka and the show's team staging a drag brunch event in the River's Edge event venue.
