= Burford, Ontario =

Burford
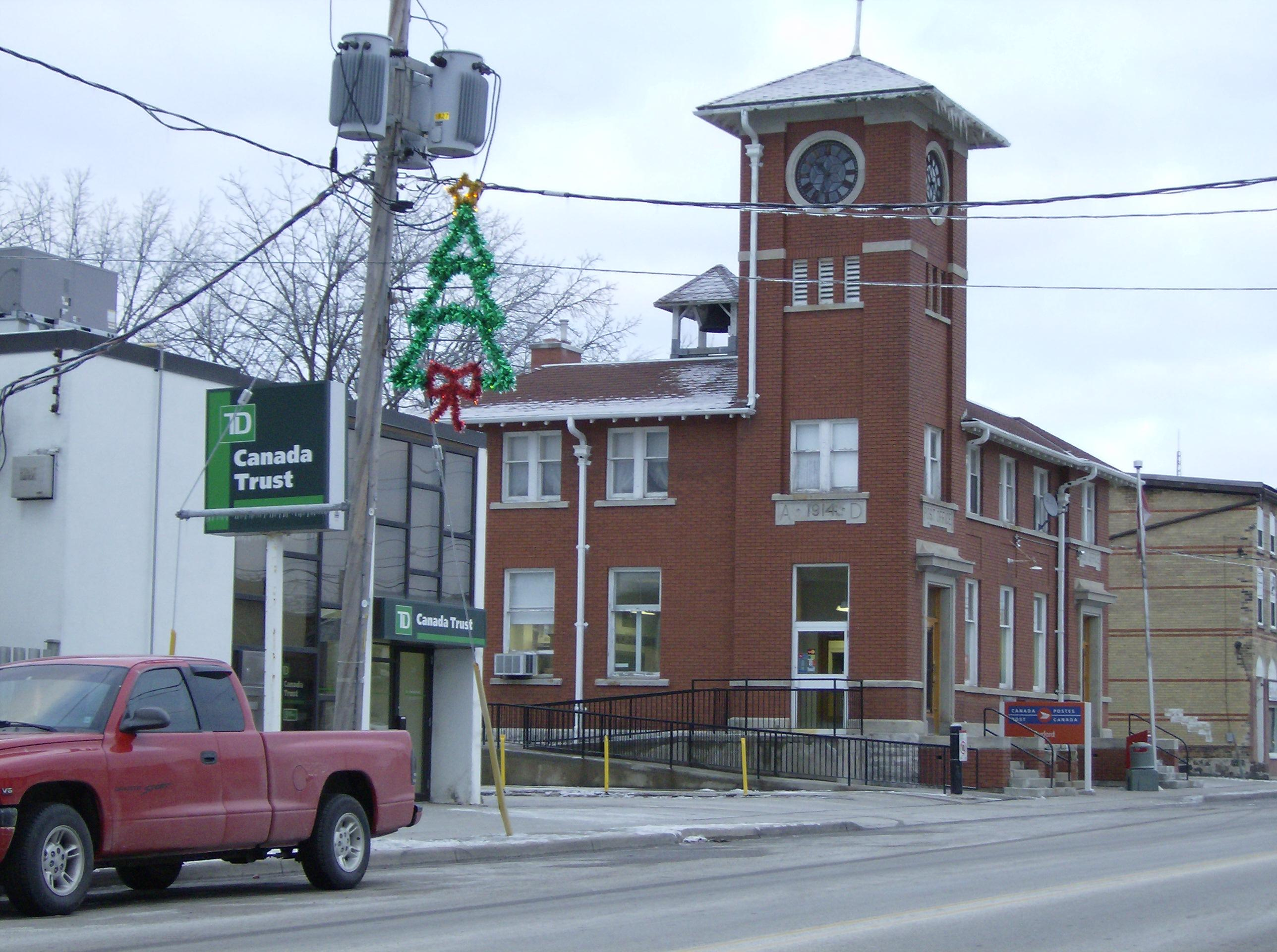
- Canada Post Office in Burford's downtown

- Location within County of Brant Location within Ontario
- Coordinates: 43°6′7.92″N 80°25′44.4″W
- Country: Canada
- Province: Ontario
- County: Brant
- Settled: 1793

Area
  - Total: 2.01 km^{2} (0.78 sq mi)
- Elevation: 251 m (823 ft)

Population (2021)
  - Total: 1,058
  - Density: 525.3/km^{2} (1,361/sq mi)
- Time zone: UTC-5 (Eastern)
- Postal code: N0E 1A0
- Area codes: 519 and 226

Burford is a rural community and is part of the County of Brant, in central southwestern Ontario. It has 1,058 residents (2021 Census). It is located eight kilometres west of the City of Brantford along Highway 53, and seventy kilometres east of London, Ontario. It is approximately 100 km southwest of Toronto.

Administrative offices for the County of Brant are located in Burford, making it one of three service hubs for the county (the others being Paris and St. George). Amongst designated heritage properties in the area is the former Burford Armoury, built in 1906, which was important for military training in earlier days when Canada had an active militia force in each county (the role now served by the Canadian Forces Reserves).

Burford is home to the Burford Bulldogs, a junior hockey team that plays in the Provincial Junior Hockey League.

Burford has a local golf course, Burford Golf Links, which was founded in 1980. It has gone through a number of different owners and is now part of the GolfNorth group of golf courses.

Burford also hosts the Burford Fall Fair every year. The fair was established in 1858 and after being hosted in Harley as the World's Fair, was relocated to Burford, when the Burford fair grounds were purchased in 1893. Over the years the Burford fair has grown from a one-day fair in 1893 to its current three days, hosted every Thanksgiving weekend. The fair attracts tourists and visitors from the surrounding towns as well as larger county of Brant and beyond.

== History ==
Burford, at one time known as Claremont, was the largest community in the former Burford Township (land area 71,122 acres (287.82 km2), population (1996) 5858), which included Cathcart, Harley, Princeton and other smaller communities. Burford Township was part of the County of Oxford before the formation of Brant County in 1851, and due to its location on the primary roadway leading into Oxford, built upon the ancient footpath leading from Burlington Bay through Brant's Ford to the Thames River known as the Detroit Trail, Burford was Oxford's gateway community. In the days before automobiles it served a great many travellers, but now is hardly noticed by motorists with distant destinations. Burford's 'downtown', the intersection of Maple Avenue and King Street (Highway 53), now includes only a stop light, several small businesses and a post office.

=== Early history ===
The community was founded by the family of Abraham Dayton, who was granted authority in 1793 to settle Burford Township with a religious congregation led by the Public Universal Friend, whom Governor Simcoe believed to be Quakers. According to Burford historian Robert Muir, "Wilkinson had drawn together a considerable body of free thinkers, undecided characters, and disgruntled members of other Christian bodies. These followers... were looked upon by the inhabitants who surrounded them, as a set of religious fanatics" who "decided at last, like the followers of Joseph Smith at a later date, to seek out a "New Canaan"" and appointed Dayton as their emissary to seek land in Upper Canada. "Abraham Dayton was an intelligent and estimable citizen, and his connection with the peculiar religious society, the infliction of whose presence Burford narrowly escaped, which first brought him to Burford, was doubtless brought about by force of circumstances and the nature of his local surroundings."

Dayton fell ill and became bedridden shortly after moving his family into Burford, so continuation of work to bring settlers into the township fell to his son-in-law, Benajah Mallory. Dayton died in 1797 and his family's control of the township was rescinded by the government the same year. Benajah Mallory inherited the land which had been claimed by Dayton (including 600 acres at the western end of what became Burford Village) and he remained the flamboyant, but disgruntled leader of the settlement, and was elected as the member in the provincial assembly in 1804 and again in 1808 for Oxford, Norfolk and Middlesex. As a politician he was aligned with opposition members led by Joseph Willcocks, and with Willcocks turned traitor halfway through the War of 1812.

=== Duncombe rebellion ===
Shortly after the outbreak of the Rebellion of 1837 in Toronto, Burford Township was the centre of an abortive rebellion in the London District of Upper Canada led by Dr. Charles Duncombe. An American by birth, Duncombe made his home east of Burford Village in 1828 and by popular demand entered politics, being elected to the legislative assembly as member for Oxford County in 1830 and again in 1834. He was increasingly drawn to a leadership role for the Reform cause and by 1837 was as well known in the province as William Lyon Mackenzie. Duncombe was at his home in Burford when rumour arrived that Mackenzie had launched his Rebellion and his supporters had taken control of Toronto. "Carried away with the excitement of Mackenzie s reputed success, the people of South Dumfries, Oxford, Burford and Oakland urged Dr. Duncombe to lead a movement in support of the advance on the capital. Reluctantly, but willing to stake everything on the result of a strike for freedom, he consented, and appointed a rendezvous at the Village of Scotland" with the intention of marching through Oakland township, Brantford and Hamilton to support Mackenzie. Over 300 men had gathered in Oakland before the news arrived that Mackenzie had been defeated, and on learning this, Duncombe ordered those in Oakland to disband.

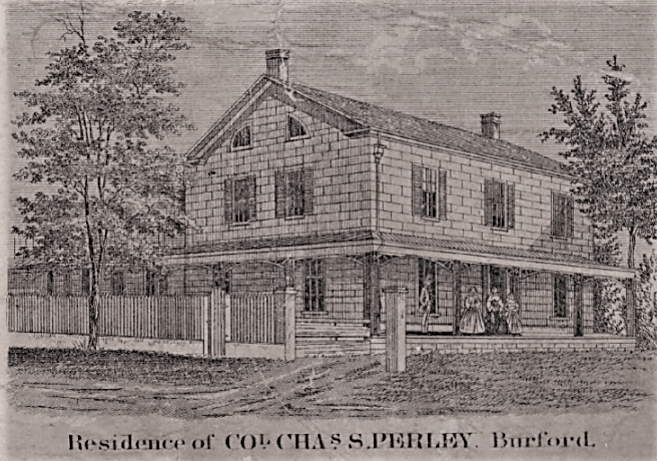
1858 view of Col. Perley's residence

The antithesis of Duncombe and Mallory, Charles Strange Perley then came to the fore, as described in Beer & Company's History of the County of Brant (1883): "In this township, where fifty years ago political passions were so heated, it is pleasant to look back on the honourable career of some of the leading men who, though keen partisans, have closed their course amid the applause of both sides in the political arena. Such a man, on the Loyalist side, was Charles S. Perley, the well-known Colonel Perley of the last forty years of Burford's history. His burly figure, genial face, and brusque manner, the boisterous frankness of Squire Western masking the kindly nature of an Allworlhy, will long be remembered by the people of Bishopsgate and Burford Villages, among whom his life was spent... In 1837 Mr. Perley took an active part in raising a company, which he commanded with the rank of Captain, confirmed to him in 1838. He received and most hospitably entertained Colonel MacNab and those "Men of Gore," the Wentworth Militia, in their march against Duncombe's force at Scotland. Captain Perley accompanied the Loyalists when they occupied Scotland, where Duncombe's force being disbanded, they found no enemy on whom to exercise their valour. Then followed the "Tory Terror," which lasted till peremptory orders from England and the recall in disgrace of Sir Francis Bond Head gave it a sudden check. But in those days Captain Perley was quite ready and willing to hang a good many of those neighbours to whom for many years of his after life he showed such unfailing kindness... For his many services he was soon promoted to the rank of Lieut.-Colonel. But his life was thenceforward to be that of a man of peace, erecting mills clearing farms, introducing new agricultural improvements, and by action and counsel aiding in the development of the township in which he lived."

=== Railway development ===
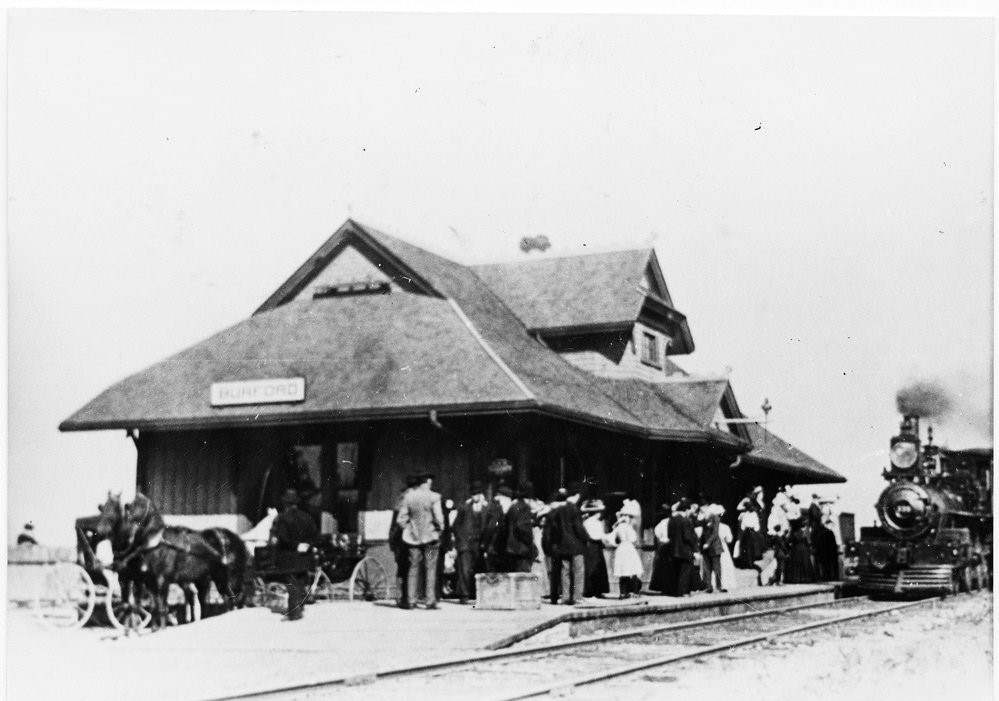
train pulling into Burford station

The railway era dawned in the area in 1853 with the opening of the Great Western Railway between Hamilton and London, but it passed north of Burford, leaving the community languishing as horse-drawn traffic dwindled along its main roadway. A new boost of prosperity came when a rail line was opened from Brantford to Norwich and Tillsonburg in Oxford County in 1878, passing through Burford south of the fairgrounds. Initially the advantage was easier access to and from Brantford and Tillsonburg by rail for passengers, and Burford remained a quiet village, described in 1883 as "built up to a great degree by farmers who have realized enough to retire from business and take up their abode there. In summer time Burford Village is as pleasant a holiday resort as can be found in the Province, and the hotel provides most comfortable accommodation. There are no saloons or liquor stores; the village enjoys an Arcadian freedom from drunkenness and other offences against law and order." It was probably this which convinced British artist Robert Whale to make Burford his home when he brought his family to Canada. Eventually a milk processing factory and a canning factory located on the rail line at Burford, and freight traffic kept the line in operation for a century, but it was abandoned between Burford and Tillsonburg in 1987, and between Brantford and Burford in 2001. The tracks have since then been removed along the line, but the path of the railway right-of-way is still visible using Google Maps satellite view.

=== Recent history ===
Burford is now populated by Canadians of German, Dutch and British backgrounds. In 1999, Burford became part of the County of Brant, an amalgamation of several local municipalities including Brantford Township, the town of Paris, Oakland Township, Onondaga Township and South Dumfries Township. The current mayor of the County of Brant is David Bailey.

Historically, when tobacco was lucrative, the farms and families surrounding Burford were relatively prosperous. However, when smoking habits began to change in the 1980s, the economy slipped into decline. Currently, farmers are more likely to be growing ginseng for Asian markets than tobacco. Dairy, poultry, hog and fish farming persist and range from large scale commercial operations to subsistence type family farms. The community has lost population since the 1970s and is eager to attract new investment.

== Education ==
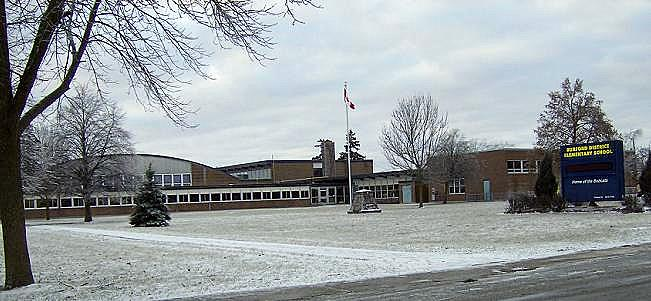
Burford's public school

Burford District High School was the only secondary institution for eighty years, opening in 1922 and closing in June 2002 due to low enrollment. The building was then revamped to become Burford District Elementary School and drew students from three elementary schools which were closed around the same time: Maple Avenue, Coronation and Harley-Northfield. The Maple Avenue School was also home to the Burford Islamic School or Darul Uloom Al Islamiah Burford, a private school with a Muslim based education. The building is now for sale after multiple incidents of defacement resulted in the closure of the school. Most high school age students now attend Paris District High School, Brantford Collegiate Institute or Assumption College and St. John's College Catholic schools.

== Notable people ==
- Emma Woods, professional ice hockey forward for the Toronto Sceptres

== See also ==
- List of townships in Ontario
