= Ted Reader =

Canadian chef

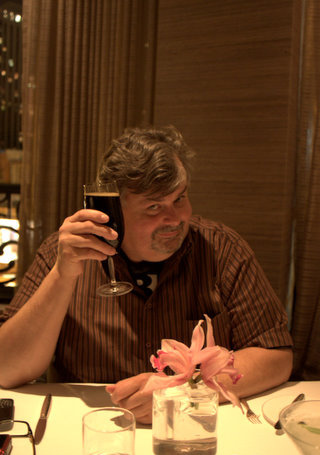
Ted Reader dining in Chicago in 2010

Ted Reader is a Canadian chef and author of several cookbooks.

== Biography ==
Reader is from Paris, Ontario, and is a graduate of George Brown College's culinary management program. Beginning his career in local restaurants, he eventually became executive chef at the Skydome Hotel at Rogers Centre in Toronto. He later held a five-year tenure as executive chef of President's Choice.

For nine years, Reader was the featured grill chef on the series Cottage Country, and he was also a team chef with Cart Racing for three seasons, for drivers Adrian Fernandez and Roberto Moreno. He has also made regular guest appearances on Citytv's Breakfast Television, Toronto's AM 640, and is a part of Rock Mornings with Craig Venn and Lucky on 94.9 The Rock. He is the author of several cookbooks including Sticks and Stones: The Art of Grilling on Plank, and Vine and Stone, which was awarded the Silver Medal in the Cuisine Canada 2000 Cookbook Awards. Other cookbooks include Napoleon's Everyday Gourmet Grilling, Napoleon's Everyday Gourmet Plank Grilling, and Napoleon's Everyday Gourmet Burgers which were bestsellers in Canada.

Reader also has a line of sauces and products, called Ted's World Famous BBQ. Products include "Beerlicious BBQ Sauce", "Crazy Canuck BBQ Sauce", "Pineapple Rum BBQ Sauce", "Apple Brown Betty BBQ Sauce", "Orgasmic Onion", "Bone Dust", and "Maple and Cedar Planks".

In 2010, Reader attempted to set a world record for the largest hamburger, grilling a 268-kilogram burger in downtown Toronto as part of a promotional tour for a cookbook.

Reader has said that his current home in Etobicoke is the place that has felt most like home after years of frequent moves. He has described the house as a source of comfort and stability, adding that its proximity to the airport was particularly beneficial during the busiest years of his culinary career, when he regularly travelled for work several times a month.
