= Tuffy Truesdale =

American professional wrestler (1916–2001)

Personal information
- Born: Adolph Albert Truesdale; September 8, 1916 Nokomis, Illinois, U.S.
- Died: March 30, 2001 (aged 84) Asheville, North Carolina

Professional wrestling career
- Ring name: Tuffy Truesdale
- Billed height: 5 ft 5 in (1.65 m)
- Billed weight: 165 lb (75 kg)
- Debut: c. 1936
- Retired: c. 1969

Adolph Albert Truesdale (September 8, 1916 – March 30, 2001), better known as Tuffy Truesdale, was an American professional wrestler.

== Biography ==
Truesdale was born September 8, 1916, in Nokomos, Illinois. He began wrestling during the 1930s. In September 1944, Truesdale was billed as the World Middleweight Champion in the Tennessee wrestling territory. He reportedly won the title from Gust Kallio in Mexico City, Mexico the previous year. On May 31, 1944, Truesdale unsuccessfully challenged El Santo in a match for the then vacant Mexican National Middleweight Championship.

However, Truesdale later became known for his matches against animals. On March 7, 1947, he wrestled a 'Wrestling Alligator' in Wichita, Kansas. In later matches the Alligator was named Rodney the Alligator.

In the summer of 1953, he traveled to New Hamburg, Ontario in hopes of wrestling the crocodile-like monster that was claimed to be hiding in the Nith River near the area. It is highly likely that the monster did not actually exist.

Later he began wrestling with a bear named Victor. Truesdale and Victor made several televised appearances, including on The Ed Sullivan Show, To Tell the Truth and Let's Make a Deal. Truesdale and Victor would also appear in Sports Illustrated in 1970.

Truesdale died on March 30, 2001, at the Oteen Veterans Administration Hospital in Asheville, North Carolina.

== Championships and accomplishments ==
- Gulas-Welch Enterprises
  - World Middleweight Championship (Tennessee version) (1 time)
