= Henry Girdlestone Acres =

Canadian hydroelectric engineer (1880-1945)

Henry Girdlestone Acres (1880-1945) was a hydroelectric engineer from St. Catharines, Canada.

== Biography ==
Acres was born in Paris, Ontario, and was educated at the University of Toronto. In 1908, he married Augusta Louise Helliwell Acres. They had a daughter, Constance, who died in 1939.

Acres contributed to the design and oversight of the Chippawa-Queenston Project for the Ontario Hydro-Electric Power Commission and the Shipshaw development in Arvida, Quebec. The latter was inaugurated in 1942 as the world's largest localized power development.

In 1905, Acres was involved in the introduction of a 10,000-horsepower turbine. In 1907, he oversaw the establishment of the first 110,000-volt transmission line. Throughout his career, he worked with multiple Canadian organizations, including the Hydro-Electric Power Commission of Ontario and Vickers.
