= Paris, Ontario =

Paris
- Unincorporated community
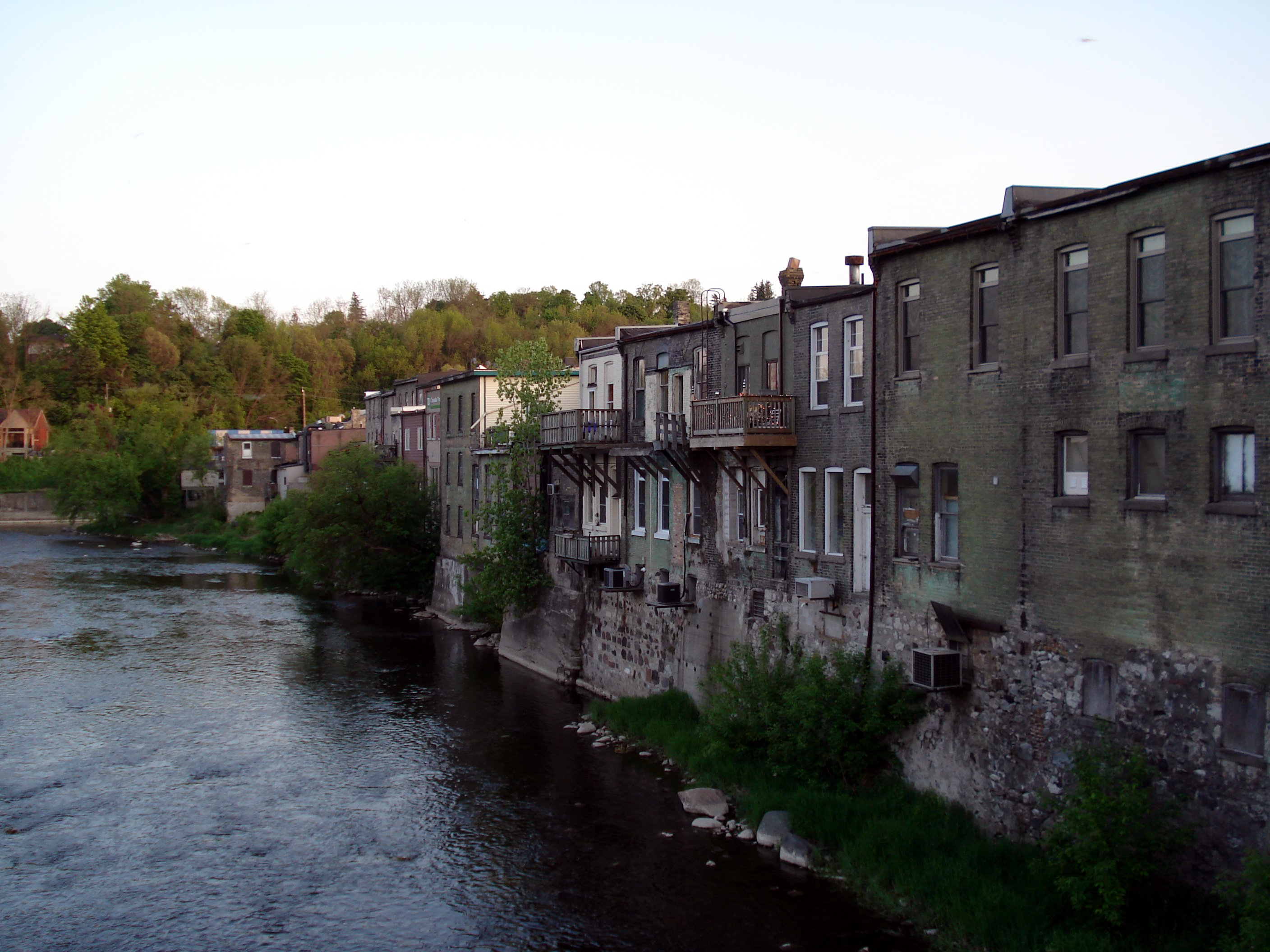
- Grand River riverfront in Paris, Ontario

- Location within County of Brant Location within Southern Ontario
- Coordinates: 43°11′36″N 80°23′05″W
- Country: Canada
- Province: Ontario
- County: Brant

Area
  - Total: 13.55 km^{2} (5.23 sq mi)

Population (2021)
  - Total: 14,956
  - Density: 1,103.6/km^{2} (2,858/sq mi)
- Forward sortation area: N3L

Paris (2021 population, 14,956) is a community located in the County of Brant, Ontario, Canada. It lies just northwest from the city of Brantford at the spot where the Nith River empties into the Grand River. Paris was voted "the Prettiest Little Town in Canada" by Harrowsmith Magazine. The town was established in 1850. In 1999, its town government was amalgamated into that of the County of Brant, ending 149 years as a separate incorporated municipality, with Paris as the largest population centre in the county.

== History ==
Census	Population
1841	1,000
1871	2,640
1881	3,173
1891	3,094
1901	3,229
1911	4,098
1921	4,368
1931	4,137
1941	4,637
1951	5,249
1961	5,820
1971	6,483
1981	7,485
1991	8,600
2001	9,881
2006	11,177
2011	11,763
2016	12,389
2021	14,956

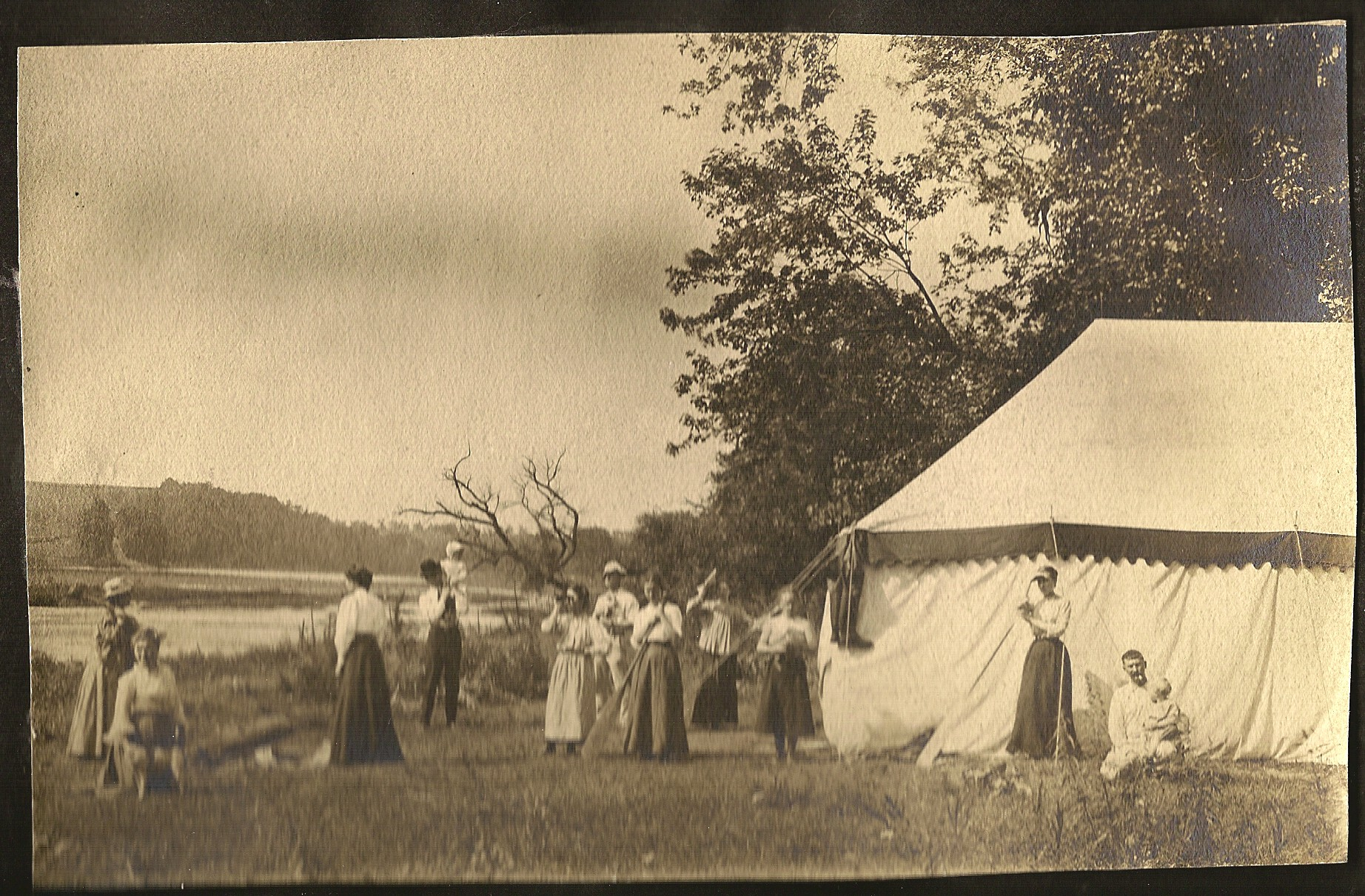
Turn of the century family gathering on the banks of the Grand River near Paris

Paris was named for the nearby deposits of gypsum, used to make plaster of Paris. This material was discovered in 1793 while the area was being surveyed for the British Home Department. By late 1794 a road had been built from what is now Dundas, Ontario, to the east bank of the Grand River in what became Paris, called The Governor's Road (now Dundas St. in Paris). The town has been referred to as "the cobblestone capital of Canada" (in reference to a number of aged cobblestone houses).

The town was first settled on 7 May 1829, when its founder, Hiram Capron, originally from Vermont, bought the land at the Forks of the Grand in 1829 for $10,000 and divided some land into town lots. Capron built a grist mill on the present townsite and was also involved in opening an iron foundry and in mining of gypsum

Records from 1846 indicate that the settlement, in a hilly area called Oak Plains, was divided into the upper town and the lower town. In addition to successful farmers in the area, the community of 1000 people (Americans, Scottish, English, and Irish) was thriving. Manufacturing had already begun, with industries powered by the river. A great deal of plaster was being exported and there were three mills, a tannery, a woolen factory, a foundry, and numerous tradesmen. Five churches had been built; the post office was receiving mail three times a week.

The village was incorporated in 1850 with Hiram "Boss" Capron as the first Reeve. It was incorporated as a town in 1856 with H. Finlayson as the first mayor. By 1869, the population was about 3,200.

While the telephone was invented at Brantford, Ontario, in 1874, Alexander Graham Bell reminded people in the area about a Paris connection. "Brantford is right in claiming the invention of the telephone" and "the first transmission to a distance was made between Brantford and Paris" (on 3 August 1876).

The use of cobblestones to construct buildings had been introduced to the area by Levi Boughton when he erected St. James Church in 1839; this was the first cobblestone structure in Paris. Two churches and ten homes, all in current use, are made of numerous such stones taken from the rivers. Other architectural styles that are visible in the downtown area include Edwardian, Gothic, and Post Modern.

Paris is also the transmitter site for a number of broadcast radio and TV stations serving the Brantford and Kitchener-Waterloo areas. The actual tower site is 475 Ayr Road, just south of the town of Ayr, and it was erected and owned by Global Television Network in 1974 for CIII-TV. It was officially the main transmitter for the southern Ontario Global network until 2009, when its Toronto rebroadcaster (which had been the de facto main transmitter, given that the station was and still is based in Toronto) was redesignated as the main transmitter. Global leases space on the Ayr tower for broadcast clients including Conestoga College's campus radio station CJIQ-FM as well as local rebroadcasters of the CBC's Toronto-based outlets.

The town hosts an annual Fall Fair which takes place over the Labour Day weekend. The Fair has rural lifestyle exhibits, a midway complete with carnival games, rides, and a demolition derby. The Fair is also host to country music nights which have included big-name acts such as Montgomery Gentry, Gord Bamford, Emerson Drive, Chad Brownlee, Deric Ruttan, Kira Isabella, and James Barker Band.

Paris is also the northernmost community to participate in Southern Ontario's Green Energy Hub.

Since the late 1990s, Paris has experienced population growth, which may be in part attributed to the rising popularity of rural communities among GTA bound commuters (see bedroom community) and the completion of Highway 403 between Hamilton and Woodstock.

== Municipal government ==
The County is divided into five wards, each with two elected Councillors. The Mayor from 1999 to 2018 was Ron Eddy. David Bailey became the new mayor in October 2018. The County provides fire and ambulance services but contracts with the Ontario Provincial Police to provide police services, overseen by the Police Services Board. The administrative offices are located in Burford, Ontario.

== Sights and attractions ==
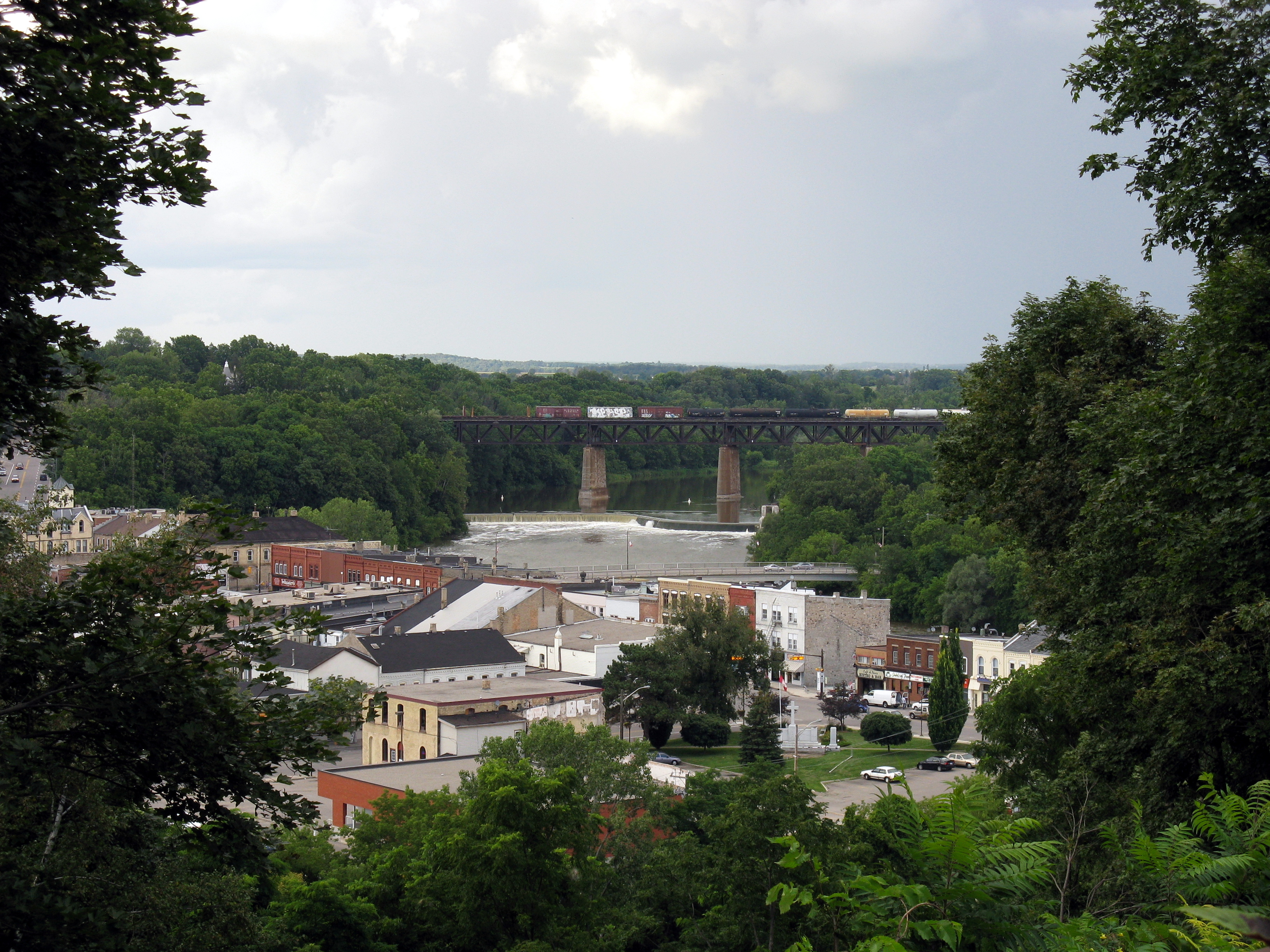
Overlook of downtown Paris

- Barker's Bush is a network of community walking/biking trails, rare Carolinian forest, thriving ecosystem, and natural corridors. Its main access is through Lion's Park.
- Paris Fairgrounds is home to the five-day Labour Day Weekend Fair.
- Paris Speedway Track is a motorcycle track which has held some national-level races. Notable riders include John Kehoe and Kyle Legault.
- Penman's Dam was built in 1918 by John Penman, a textile industrialist. A partnership project led by the Paris Firefighter's Club sees the dam lit up each evening and can be viewed crossing the William Street Bridge or at one of the riverside restaurants or coffee shops.

== Education ==
- Public schools in Paris are run by the Grand Erie District School Board, while Catholic schools fall under the administration of the Brant-Haldimand-Norfolk Catholic District School Board. The town also has a Montessori Children's Academy.
- Paris Central Public School is an elementary school located near the centre of downtown, with over 300 students.
- North Ward School, another public elementary school, is located on Silver Street in the north end of the town.
- Other elementary schools include Holy Family Elementary School (Catholic), Sacred Heart Elementary School (Catholic) and Cobblestone Elementary School (public).
- Paris District High School (PDHS), founded 1923, is a regional public high school in the town, with over 1005 students. The school serves as a regional secondary school for Paris and various other communities of Brant County, including Burford, St. George, and Glen Morris.

== In film ==
- Paris Paris (2022) (television)
- Let It Snow (location) (2019)
- Bark Ranger (location) (2015)
- Away from Her (2006)
- Silent Hill (location) (2006)
- The Prize Winner of Defiance, Ohio (2005)
- Phil the Alien (exteriors) (2004)
- Shadow Builder (1998)
- Spenser: Pale Kings and Princes (1994) (Television)
- Ordinary Magic (1993)
- Blood and Guts (1978)
- The Hard Part Begins (1973)

== Notable people ==
- Syl Apps, Olympian in pole vaulting, Toronto Maple Leafs hockey player, and Member of Provincial Parliament
- John Bemrose, author of The Island Walkers
- Todd Brooker, alpine skier
- George Bernard Flahiff, Archbishop of Winnipeg from 1961 to 1982 and cardinal of the Roman Catholic Church
- Zac Dalpe, Charlotte Checkers hockey player
- George Wallace Gouinlock, prominent architect of the late 19th and early 20th century
- Walter Gretzky, father of Wayne Gretzky, attended high school in Paris from the family farm in nearby Canning, Ontario.
- Karen Harvey, women's steeplechase record holder and cross-country coach.
- Mickey Ion, ice hockey referee in the PCHA, WCHL and NHL. Member of the Hockey Hall of Fame.
- J. Murray Luck, biochemist and founder of Annual Reviews
- John Muckler, NHL Coach and General Manager
- John Penman, early manufacturer and businessman
- Ted Reader, celebrity chef
- Linda Schuyler, television producer of Degrassi franchise
- Barry Silverthorn, documentary producer of The End of Suburbia
- Glen Sonmor, hockey player and manager
- H. J. Sterling, hockey executive and president of the Canadian Amateur Hockey Association
- Albert Johnson Walker, infamous conman and convicted killer
- William "Lady" Taylor, early professional ice hockey player in the IPHL and OPHL.
- Jay Wells, ice hockey player with the New York Rangers and Stanley Cup champion in 1994.
- Henry Girdlestone Acres, hydroelectric engineer

== Buildings and structures ==
- CIII Television Tower
- Paris Old Town Hall
- The Historic Arlington Hotel
- The Canadian Tavern
- Hamilton Place (Key example of Cobblestone building in Canada)
- Paris Branch of the County of Brant Public Library (a Carnegie Library)
