= Hiram Capron =

Founder of the town of Paris, Ontario (1796–1872)

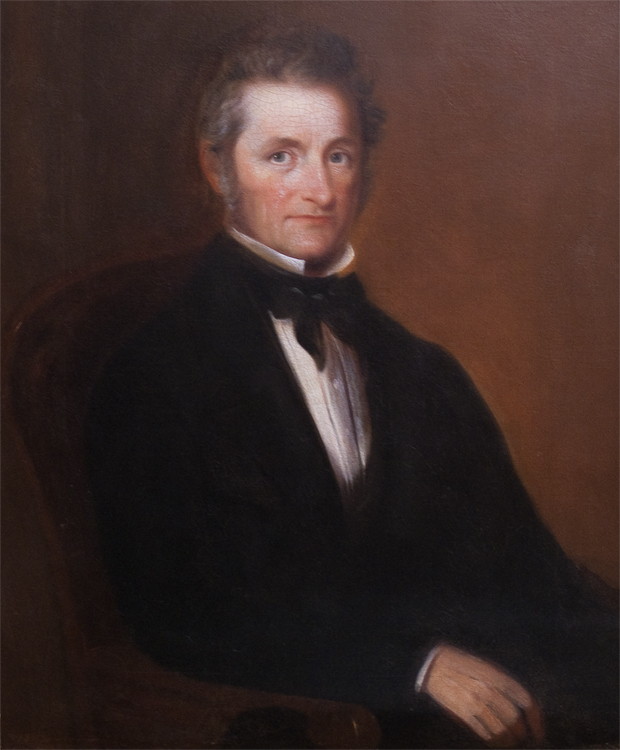
- Portrait by Robert R. Whale, c. 1852

Reeve of Paris
- In office 1850–1851
- In office 1854–1855

Personal details
- Born: February 12, 1796 Leicester, Vermont
- Died: September 10, 1872 (aged 76) Paris, Ontario
- Spouse: Mary De Long

Hiram Capron (February 12, 1796 – September 10, 1872) was the founder of the town of Paris in Ontario, Canada, which was incorporated in 1849. An immigrant from the United States, he purchased large plots of land by the Grand River and Nith River which he settled and developed.

== Early life ==
Capron was born and raised in the town of Leicester, Vermont in 1796 to a family of farmers. Upon reaching adulthood, he briefly worked as an instructor at a ladies' academy before moving to New York to work for an iron-founder named Theophilus Short. Short owned a number of iron blast furnaces in the area of Shortsville, and he employed Capron as a bookkeeper. Some time later, about 1821, Capron began investigating establishing his own blast furnace and, with a few business associates, he purchased a plot of land in Norfolk County by Lake Erie and erected a new blast furnace in 1822. By 1823 the furnace was operational and Capron was traveling the province selling ironware. At this time he revoked his American citizenship in order to swear an oath to the crown of England.

In 1823, Capron passed through the area then known as The Forks of the Grand River where he met a man named William Holme. At this time, most of the land which now makes up Paris belonged to Holme; the region was mostly undeveloped, but included a small plaster mill which likely indicated to Capron the area's economic value. While the two men conducted no business on this occasion, Capron was eventually able to buy the land from Holme and in 1829 prepared to move to his new home.

== Paris ==
Once he had moved to the Forks of the Grand River, Capron set about clearing the land and dividing it into lots. He began leasing it to settlers in order to encourage the growth of a community. He also undertook the development of Governor's Road, the Paris branch of the Dundas Street highway, in order to permit trade and further enhance the growth of the village. When the village had grown enough to sustain industry, Capron began developing his land along the Nith and Grand Rivers into raceways to supply water power, which would eventually form the basis of the town's manufacturing industry.

== Incorporation and later life ==
Paris was officially incorporated as a village in 1849, with a population of 1000, and its formal political structure was established at the beginning of 1850. As the head of the founding members, Capron was elected the first reeve, and would serve another term in 1854; he also served a number of early terms as a councillor. However, he did not pursue a career in politics and spent the rest of his life farming, and managing the land and water-ways that he owned and rented.

He died in Paris on September 10, 1872, after a period of ill health.
