= Middleport, Ontario =

Middleport, Ontario Tgahędá·yę’ (Onondaga)
- Dispersed Rural Community
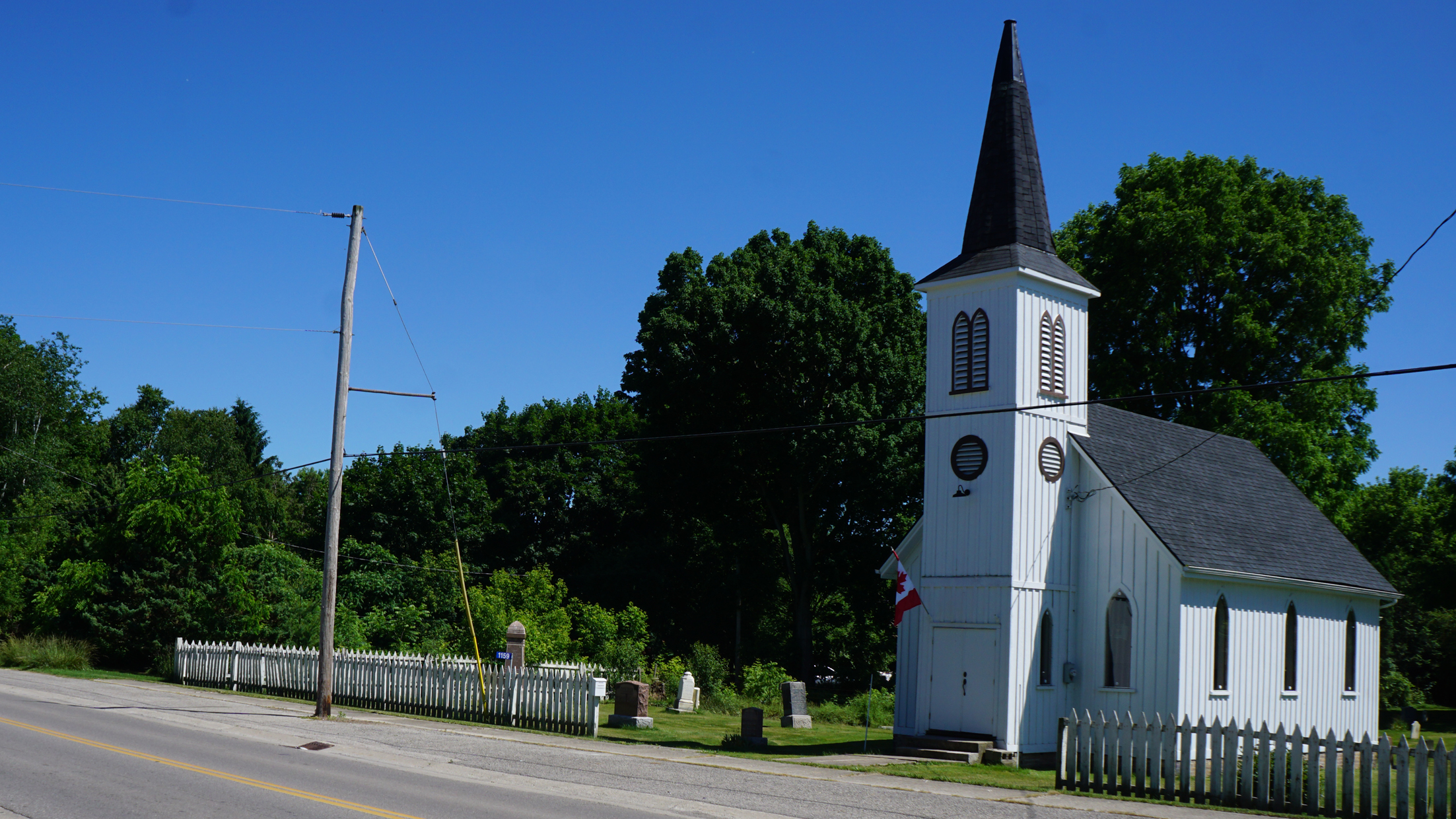
- St. Paul's Anglican Church in Middleport

- Location within County of Brant Location within Southern Ontario
- Coordinates: 43°06′03″N 80°04′26″W
- Country: Canada
- Province: Ontario
- Municipality: County of Brant
- Time zone: UTC-5 (Eastern (EST))
  - Summer (DST): UTC-4 (EDT)
- GNBC Code: FEBIB

Middleport is a dispersed rural community in the County of Brant, Ontario, Canada.

Once an important port on the Grand River, Middleport's commercial importance declined with the expansion of the railroads.

== History ==
The settlement was founded by John Solomon Hagar in 1838, and named "Middleport" because it was located along the Grand River midway between Brantford and Caledonia. Members of the neighboring Haudenosaunee Six Nations of the Grand River reserve tried to violently prevent Hagar from the settling, and then tried unsuccessfully to remove him by court order.

Another early settler, Charles Baldwin, opened Middleport General Store in 1850—an extant building still operating in Middleport. Selling both groceries and liquor, it "became a favourite resort for the Indians and lumbermen."

Middleport was described as "beautifully situated on elevated ground, commanding a fine view of the river and surrounding country". By the early 1880s, Middleport had a population of about 100, and contained a bakery, church, grist mill, hotel, post office, two churches, two blacksmiths, two general stores, and a wagon and carriage shop.

The settlement was part of the Grand River canal system, operated by the Grand River Navigation Company, and large quantities of timber harvested from the surrounding area were shipped by boat from Middleport. A flag station of the Grand Trunk Railway was located in Middleport, and a ferry connected Middleport to the Indigenous reserve across the Grand River.

Middleport declined when timber in the region was exhausted, and because its river-based economy was replaced by the railroad hub in nearby Brantford.
