= Paris District High School =

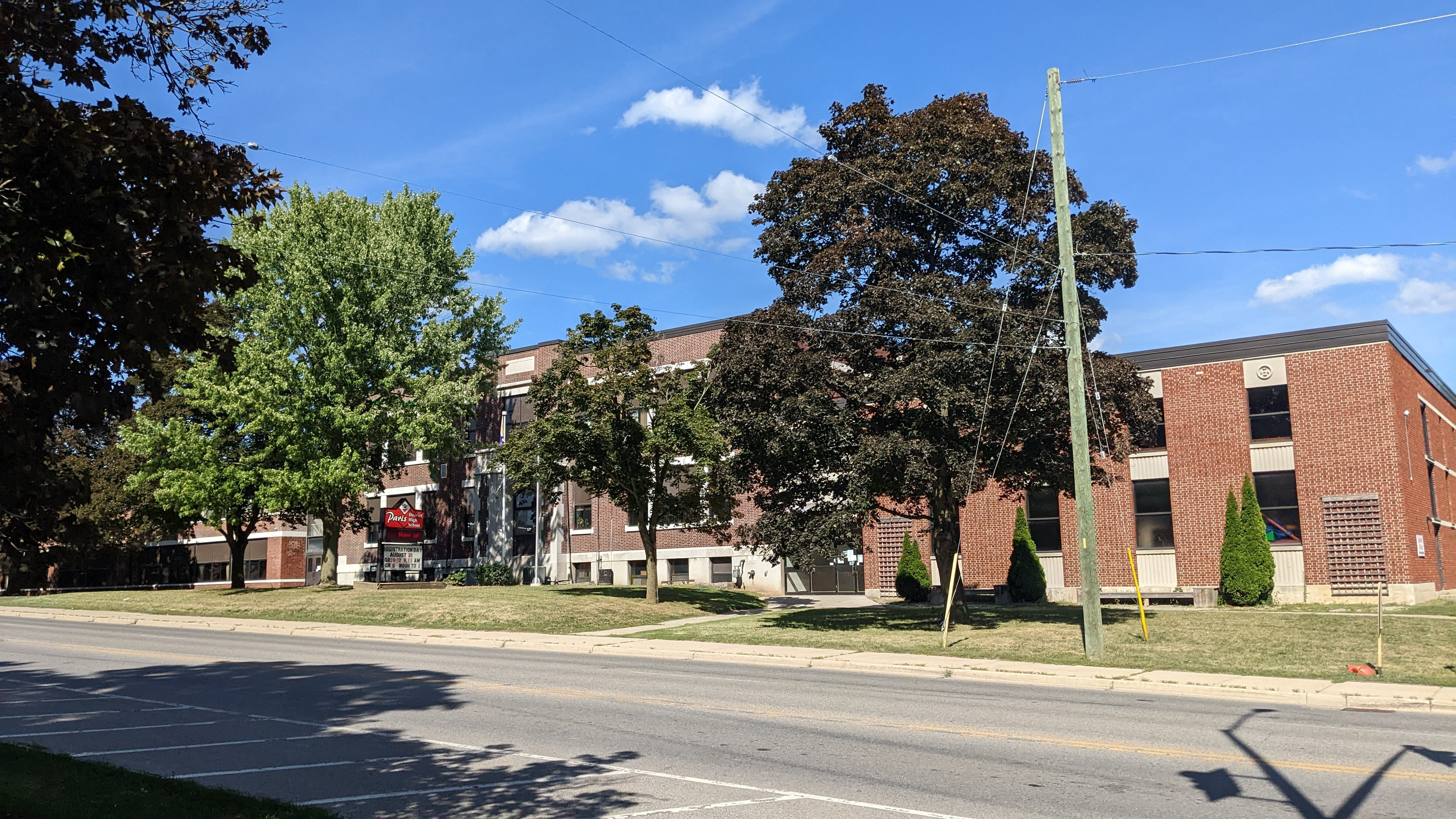

Location
- 231 Grand River North; Paris, Ontario; Canada; 43.20392°N 80.38557°W

Information
- Founded: 1923
- School board: Grand Erie District School Board
- Grades: 9-12
- Enrollment: 850 (2019/2020)
- Colours: Red, black and white
- Mascot: Black panther
- Team name: Paris Panthers
- Website: www.granderie.ca/schools/pdhs

Paris District High School (PDHS) is a regional high school in Paris, Ontario, Canada. The school was built in 1923, replacing the previous grammar school which had been built in 1858, and was known officially as Paris High School until a large addition was constructed in the late 1960s.

In 2004, PDHS served students from Paris and other towns found in the immediate area, including St. George, Drumbo, Burford, Princeton and Glen Morris.

== See also ==
- Education in Ontario
- List of secondary schools in Ontario
