= Nith River =

River in Ontario, Canada

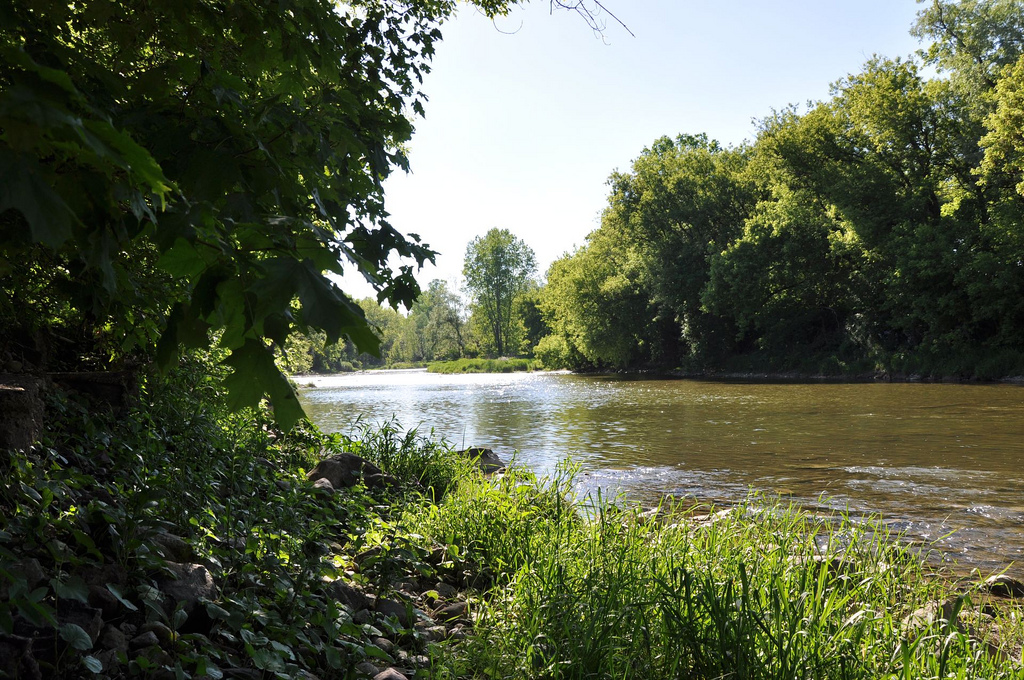
- Nith River near Canning, Ontario
- Etymology: Named after the River Nith in Scotland

Location
- Country: Canada
- Province: Ontario
- Region: Southwestern Ontario
- Districts: Brant; Oxford; Perth
- Regional municipality: Regional Municipality of Waterloo

Physical characteristics
- Source: Woodland
  - location: Wellesley, Regional Municipality of Waterloo
  - coordinates: 43°33′18″N 80°45′41″W
  - elevation: 396 m (1,299 ft)
- Mouth: Grand River
  - location: Paris, County of Brant
  - elevation: 221 m (725 ft)

Basin features
- River system: Great Lakes Basin

The Nith River is a river in Brant, Oxford and Perth counties and the Regional Municipality of Waterloo in Southwestern Ontario, Canada. The Nith River is approximately 125km in length and empties into the Grand River at the town of Paris. It is named after the River Nith in Scotland.

== Course ==
The Nith river begins in a woodland northwest of Crosshill and west of Waterloo Regional Road 5 in the township of Wellesley, Region of Waterloo. It heads north into Perth County, then turns sharply southwest and passes through the communities of Fernbank and Millbank in Perth East. It continues south, takes in the right tributary Smith Creek and arrives at the community of Nithburg. The river flows east back into Waterloo Region, takes in the right tributary Silver Creek, and then the left tributary Firella Creek south of the community of Wellesley in the township of Wellesley. The river turns south into the township of Wilmot, takes in the left tributary Bamberg Creek and passes through the communities of Phillipsburg and New Hamburg, Ontario. The Nith continues south, takes in the left tributaries Baden Creek and Hunsburger Creek, enters into Blandford-Blenheim, Oxford County and reaches the community of Plattsville. The river turns east, takes in the right tributary Black Creek, and left tributaries Hiller Creek, Alder Creek and Eden Creek, passes back into Waterloo Region, and reaches the community of Ayr in the township of North Dumfries, where it takes in the left tributary Cedar Creek. It then turns sharply west, flows back into Oxford County, then turns southeast passing through the communities of Wolverton and Canning. The Nith then flows into Brant County, takes in the right tributary Mud Creek and left tributary Charlie Creek, passing Barker's Bush and reaching its mouth at the Grand River in Paris.

== Recreation ==
The Nith River is flat water with a few riffles, but rain and snowmelt can significantly increase the flow rate. In the early spring the maximum flow rate reaches a median value of 30 and mean of 40, but commonly exceeds 200 m^{3}/s, causing major flooding in the flat regions upstream such as in and around New Hamburg. The Nith offers excellent paddling conditions in April, including a set of Class III whitewater rapids as the Nith enters Paris, yet by May, the flow rate drops below 5 m^{3}/s and becomes unsuitable for paddling.

The river is under the auspices of the Grand River Conservation Authority.

Wayne Gretzky stated on the April 26, 2022 episode of the podcast Spittin' Chiclets that the first time he ice skated was at 2 1/2 years-old on the frozen Nith River in his grandfolks' back yard.

== Folklore ==
The story of the Nith River Monster is an urban legend from the Baden area that describes an alligator-like or lizard-like creature that left three-toed footprints on the shores of the Nith. Former Chief Constable George Thomas reported spotting and shooting at the creature during the summer of 1953. John Nielson Sr., a baker who lived in New Hamburg at the time, created a model of the monster using dough and placed it on a small island in the middle of the river. Wrestler Tuffy Truesdale visited New Hamburg that summer in hopes of finding the monster. Being an urban legend, the monster is likely not real.

== Tributaries ==
- Charlie Creek (left)
- Mud Creek (right)
- Cedar Creek (left)
- Eden Creek (left)
- Alder Creek (left)
- Hiller Creek (left)
- Black Creek (right)
- Hunsburger Creek (left)
- Baden Creek (left)
- Bamberg Creek (left)
- Firella Creek (left)
- Silver Creek (right)
- Smith Creek (right)

== See also ==
- List of rivers of Ontario
