= Robert R. Whale =

Canadian painter (1805–1887)

- Born: Robert Reginald Whale; 1805; Altarnun, Cornwall
- Died: 1887 (aged 81–82); Brantford, Ontario
- Known for: Painter

Robert R. Whale (1805–1887) was an English-born Canadian painter.

== Life and work ==
Robert Reginald Whale was born in Altarnun, Cornwall in 1805. In 1852, Whale and his family emigrated to Canada, settling near Brantford, Ontario in Burford . Whale was a prolific painter, supporting himself and his family through the sale of his artwork—a challenging task in that time and place. He exhibited with the Ontario Society of Artists and with the Royal Canadian Academy of Arts beginning in 1881. Whale died in Brantford on 2 July 1887.

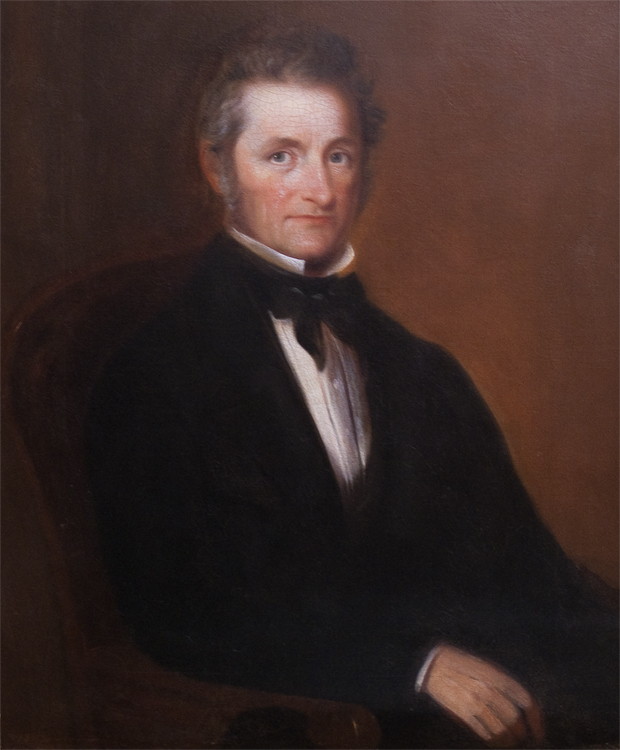
Portrait of Hiram Capron by Robert Whale, c. 1852

Whale's portraits of local inhabitants show the influence of Joshua Reynolds, often posing the sitter looking directly out of the frame—the figure highlighted against a shadowed background. Though his landscapes use elements familiar from the previous century in Europe—the distant vista framed by nearby trees, the use of small human figures in the middle distance to lead the viewer into the composition—his subject matter was completely rooted in his immediate surroundings. His body of work forms a valuable historical record of early Canada.

Works by Whale are in the collections of the National Gallery of Canada, Art Gallery of Ontario, Art Gallery of Hamilton, Museum London, Sherbrooke Museum of Fine Arts, Montreal Museum of Fine Arts and McCord Museum of Canadian History.

Two of Whale's sons, John Claude Whale and Robert Heard Whale, as well as his nephew, John Hicks Whale, also were artists.
