= County of Brant =

- City (single-tier)
- County of Brant
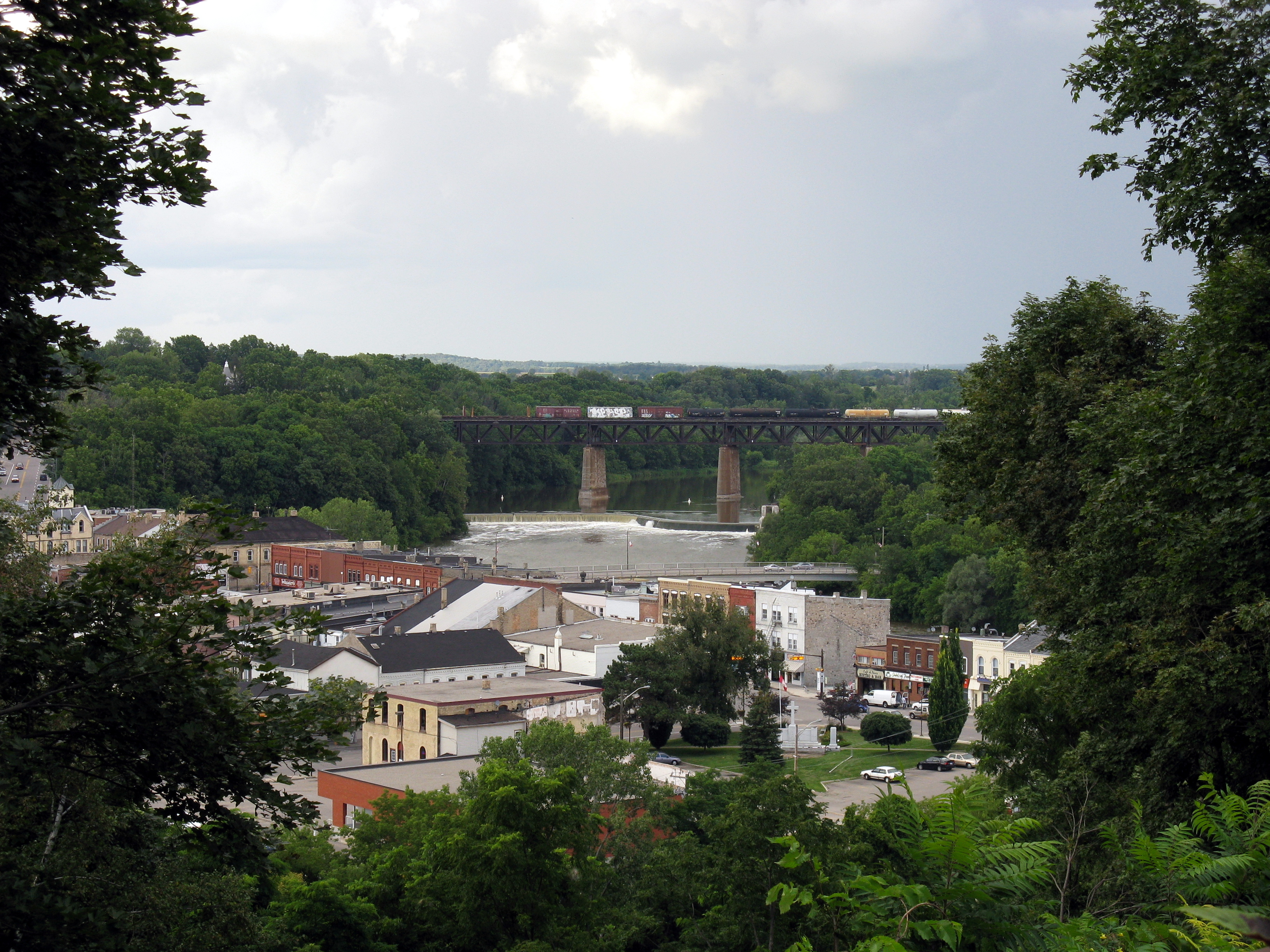
- Paris, Ontario
- Motto: Simply Grand
- Coordinates: 43°07′N 80°22′W
- Country: Canada
- Province: Ontario
- Settled: 1793
- Formed: 1851 (county)
- Formed: 1999 (single-tier city)
- Seat: Burford

Government
  - Governing body: Brant County Council
  - Mayor: David Bailey
  - MPs: Dan Muys (C) vacant (C)
  - MPP: Will Bouma (PC)

Area
  - Land: 817.66 km^{2} (315.70 sq mi)

Population (2021)
  - Total: 39,474
  - Density: 48.3/km^{2} (125/sq mi)
- Time zone: UTC-5 (EST)
  - Summer (DST): UTC-4 (EDT)
- Postal Code: N0E, N3L
- Area codes: 519, 226, and 548
- Website: www.brant.ca

The County of Brant (2021 population 39,474) is a single-tier municipality in the Canadian province of Ontario. Although it retains the word "county" in its name, the municipality is a single-tier municipal government and has no upper tier. The County of Brant has service offices in Burford, Paris, Oakland, Onondaga and St. George. The largest population centre (2021 population 14,956) is Paris.

The County of Brant is a predominantly rural municipality in Southern Ontario. The county is bordered by the township of North Dumfries in the Regional Municipality of Waterloo; the City of Hamilton; Haldimand County; Norfolk County; and the townships of Blandford-Blenheim and Norwich in Oxford County. The County abuts the provincially-mandated Greenbelt. Although the city of Brantford is surrounded by the County, it is a fully independent city with its own municipal government. The Brant census division, which includes Brantford and the Six Nations and New Credit reserves along with the County of Brant, had a population of 144,771 in the 2021 census.

The county is named after Joseph Brant and was established in 1851. Brantford separated from the county when it incorporated as a city in 1877. Part of the County is situated on the Haldimand Tract, traditional territory of the Neutral, Mississauga, and Haudenosaunee peoples.

== History ==
The area had previously been part of Wentworth and Oxford County. Brant County was formed in 1851 and originally consisted of:

- Brantford Township (Brantford, Paris, Mount Pleasant, Cainsville). Area 71,122 acres (287.82 km^{2}). First settlement made before 1810. The township was organized in 1840.
- Burford Township (Burford, Scotland), Area 71,122 acres (287.82 km^{2}). First of the midland townships to have settlers. Surveyed in 1793, four families settled on the land before 1800.
- Oakland Township (Scotland, Oakland). Area 10,676 acres (43.20 km^{2}). Originally called the Townsend Gore, then the Burford Gore, but organized a separate municipality in 1850.
- Onondaga Township (Onondaga, Middleport). Area 20,613 acres (83.42 km^{2}). First settled in 1838 within Oxford County. The formal surrender of the township by local Indigenous peoples did not take place until 1839.
- South Dumfries Township (Paris, St. George, Glen Morris). Area 46,265 acres (187.23 km^{2}).
- Tuscarora Township (Six Nations Indian Reserve, New Credit Indian Reserve), created in 1784.

On January 1, 1999, the Town of Paris and the townships of Brantford, Burford, Oakland, Onondaga, and South Dumfries amalgamated to form a new city with the official legal name of County of Brant.

=== Early history ===
Erected by the provincial and federal governments, historic plaques and monuments in Brant County indicate a long and varied history which include many aspects related to the First Nations.

The Mohawk Chief Joseph Brant (Thayendanega) and the Mohawk people of New York state served with the British during the American Revolution. In 1784, the Crown granted Joseph Brant and his followers a land treaty along the Grand River to replace what they had lost in New York State at the Sandusky Council after the Revolution. Much of this grant was later rescinded. As chief of the united tribes, Brant led his people—including Brant's African slaves captured during the revolution—to Upper Canada; a group of 400 settled in 1788 on the Grand River at Mohawk Village which later became Brantford. Nearly a century later (1886), the Joseph Brant Memorial would be erected in Burlington, Ontario in honour of Brant and the Six Nations Confederacy.

The Mohawk Chapel, built by the British Crown in 1785 for the Mohawk and Iroquois people (Six Nations of the Grand River), was dedicated in 1788 as a reminder of the original agreements made with the British during the American Revolution. In 1904 the chapel received Royal status by King Edward VII in memory of the longstanding alliance. Her Majesty's Royal Chapel of the Mohawks is an important reminder of the original agreements made with Queen Anne in 1710. It is still in use today as one of two royal Chapels in Canada and the oldest Protestant Church in the province. Joseph Brant and his son John Brant are buried here.

Significant to the county, gypsum was discovered in 1793 on the east bank of the Grand River in what became Paris during a survey for the British Home Department. By late 1794 a road had been built from what is now Dundas, Ontario to Paris, called The Governor's Road (now Dundas St. in Paris). Records from 1846 indicate that the settlement (now Paris), in a hilly area called Oak Plains, was divided into the upper town and the lower town. In addition to successful farmers in the area, the community of 1000 people (Americans, Scottish, English, and Irish) was thriving. Manufacturing had already begun, with industries powered by the river. A great deal of plaster was being exported and there were three mills, a tannery, a woolen factory, a foundry, and numerous tradesmen. Five churches had been built; the post office was receiving mail three times a week. The village was incorporated in 1850 with Hiram "Boss" Capron as the first Reeve. It was incorporated as a town in 1856 with H. Finlayson as the first mayor.

Abraham Dayton from Connecticut arrived in 1793 and was granted the entire township of Burford; additional settlers began arriving in 1797. The 1814 Battle of Malcolm's Mills during the War of 1812 took place at what is now Oakland when American forces attacked the local regiments. Neither this battle nor the 1837 Duncombe's Uprising by militant "Patriots" at the settlement of Scotland were successful.

Chief John Brant (Mohawk leader) (Ahyonwaeghs) who had lived at Mohawk Village was one of the sons of Joseph Brant. He fought with the British during the War of 1812 and later worked to improve the welfare of the First Nations. He was involved in building schools and was the improving the welfare of his people. Brant initiated the opening of schools and from 1828 served as the first native Superintendent of the Six Nations. Chief Brant was elected to Legislative Assembly of Upper Canada for Haldimand in 1830 and was the first aboriginal Canadian in Parliament.

Records from 1846 indicate that the settlement of Scotland in Burford Township had a population of about 150. At that time there were two stores, two taverns, one tannery, one saddler, one chair maker, one cabinet maker, one blacksmith. There was also a carding machine and fulling mill near the village. Nearby Oakland had about 160 inhabitants; its post office was receiving mail daily. Oakland had a grist and a saw mill, a carding machine and fulling mill, one store, two taverns, one hatter, one wagon maker, one blacksmith, one tailor, one shoemaker.

Much of the county's early population began arriving in the 1820s as the Hamilton and London Road was improved and settlement increased after 1848 when navigation to Brantford was opened and again in 1854 with the arrival of the railway to Brantford. The stone and brick Brant County Courthouse was built on land purchased from the Six Nations in 1852. The structure housed court rooms, county offices, a law library and a jail. During additions in the 1880s, the Greek Revival style, with Doric columns, was retained.

Chiefswood, now a Six Nations museum in Oshweken and one of the National Historic Sites of Canada, was built in about 1856 by Mohawk Chief George Henry Martin Johnson (Onwanonsyshon). His daughter, the Mohawk poet E. Pauline Johnson (Tekahionwake), gained great acclaim across Canada. Her work increased awareness of the history and cultural diversity of the First Nations. In 1886, the Joseph Brant Memorial was constructed in honour of Brant and the Six Nations Confederacy.

=== Railway development ===
Brant County saw relatively early railway development in Ontario's history, as it lay nearby and between major mid-19th century centres such as Toronto and London. Plans for railway development were underway in the 1830s as part of the proposed London and Gore Railroad between London and Hamilton, with a branch line planned to extend northward to Galt. After significant delays, the London and Gore eventually appeared in the form of the Great Western Railway, whose mainline opened between Hamilton and London in 1853.

Work had begun on the branch line to Galt in 1852, and it was completed in 1854. The branch line, as built, connected to the roughly east–west mainline at a junction in Brant County located at a key point aligned between four major manufacturing and administrative centres in the area: Brantford, Galt, Hamilton, and London. Originally known simply as Fairchild Creek Station, the railway town which grew up around the junction was eventually named Harrisburg after the then-president of the Great Western Railway, Robert W. Harris. This early construction date has led to some Ontario rail history writers such as Joachim Brouwer and Ron Brown to argue that Harrisburg was the first railway junction in Canada, and that the branch line to Galt was the first branch line in Canadian railway history. A second branch line, this one to Brantford, was also built south from Harrisburg in 1871, though an independent shortline named the Buffalo, Brantford and Goderich Railway reached Brantford earlier, in the 1850s.

=== Invention of the telephone ===
Alexander Graham Bell invented the telephone at his father's homestead, Melville House, now the Bell Homestead National Historic Site. At the time, the homestead was in the County, outside the Brantford city limits. In a 1906 speech, Bell made the following comment, "the telephone problem was solved, and it was solved at my father's home". As well, two of the first successful voice transmissions of any notable distance were made in early August 1876, between the telegraph office in Brantford, Ontario and Melville House and Between Paris and Brantford.

Canada's first telephone factory, created and operated by James Cowherd, was also located in Brantford from about 1879 until his death in 1881. The first telephone business office which opened in 1877, not far from the Bell Homestead, was then located in the County just outside Brantford.

== Geography ==
=== Communities ===
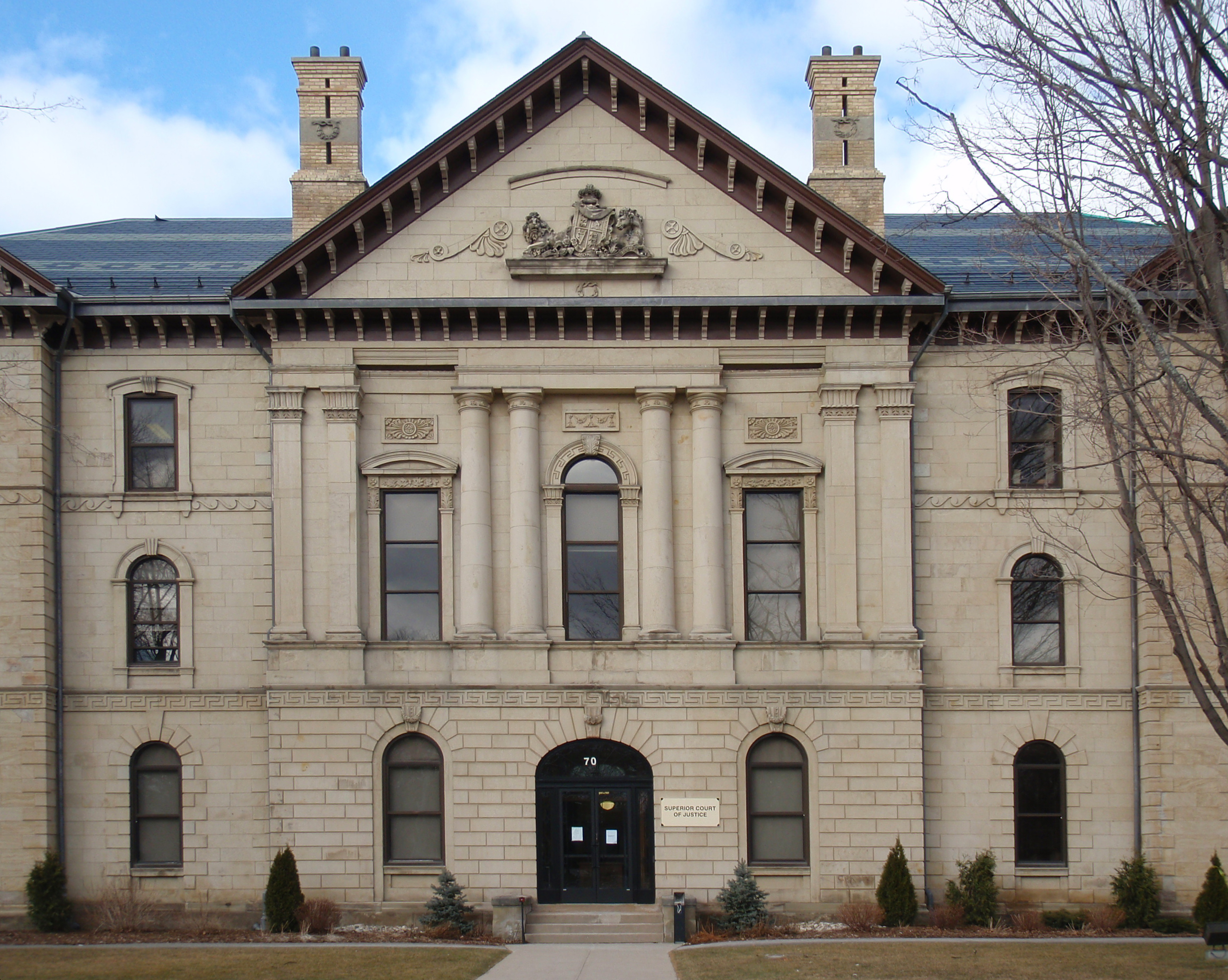
Brant County Courthouse

In addition to Brantford, population centres in Brant are Paris, St. George and Burford. Smaller communities in the municipality include Bishopsgate, Burtch, Cainsville, Cathcart, East Oakland, Etonia, Fairfield, Falkland, Glen Morris, Gobles, Harley, Harrisburg, Hatchley, Langford, Lockie, Maple Grove, Middleport, Mount Pleasant, Mount Vernon, New Durham, Newport, Northfield, Northfield Centre, Oakhill, Oakland, Onondaga, Osborne Corners, and Scotland.

=== Climate ===
Climate data for Middleport (1981−2010)
Month	Jan	Feb	Mar	Apr	May	Jun	Jul	Aug	Sep	Oct	Nov	Dec	Year
Record high °C (°F)	15.5 (59.9)	16.0 (60.8)	25.0 (77.0)	31.0 (87.8)	33.0 (91.4)	36.5 (97.7)	38.0 (100.4)	35.0 (95.0)	33.5 (92.3)	27.0 (80.6)	22.0 (71.6)	20.5 (68.9)	38.0 (100.4)
Mean daily maximum °C (°F)	−1.4 (29.5)	0.0 (32.0)	4.6 (40.3)	12.1 (53.8)	19.3 (66.7)	24.7 (76.5)	27.4 (81.3)	25.8 (78.4)	21.3 (70.3)	14.7 (58.5)	7.3 (45.1)	1.7 (35.1)	13.1 (55.6)
Daily mean °C (°F)	−5.4 (22.3)	−2.5 (27.5)	0.1 (32.2)	6.9 (44.4)	13.4 (56.1)	18.7 (65.7)	21.5 (70.7)	20.1 (68.2)	15.8 (60.4)	9.7 (49.5)	3.5 (38.3)	−1.9 (28.6)	8.2 (46.8)
Mean daily minimum °C (°F)	−9.4 (15.1)	−8.5 (16.7)	−4.4 (24.1)	1.7 (35.1)	7.4 (45.3)	12.7 (54.9)	15.5 (59.9)	14.4 (57.9)	10.2 (50.4)	4.6 (40.3)	−0.4 (31.3)	−5.4 (22.3)	3.2 (37.8)
Record low °C (°F)	−31.0 (−23.8)	−31.0 (−23.8)	−23.0 (−9.4)	−15.0 (5.0)	−5.0 (23.0)	2.0 (35.6)	7.0 (44.6)	1.0 (33.8)	−2.0 (28.4)	−7.0 (19.4)	−15.0 (5.0)	−27.5 (−17.5)	−31.0 (−23.8)
Average precipitation mm (inches)	66.6 (2.62)	55.4 (2.18)	64.0 (2.52)	74.6 (2.94)	76.5 (3.01)	76.9 (3.03)	98.7 (3.89)	75.2 (2.96)	92.3 (3.63)	73.4 (2.89)	84.6 (3.33)	70.8 (2.79)	908.9 (35.78)
Average rainfall mm (inches)	32.3 (1.27)	30.9 (1.22)	47.8 (1.88)	71.7 (2.82)	76.4 (3.01)	76.9 (3.03)	98.7 (3.89)	75.2 (2.96)	92.3 (3.63)	73.2 (2.88)	77.8 (3.06)	49.1 (1.93)	802.3 (31.59)
Average snowfall cm (inches)	34.4 (13.5)	24.4 (9.6)	16.2 (6.4)	2.9 (1.1)	0.1 (0.0)	0.0 (0.0)	0.0 (0.0)	0.0 (0.0)	0.0 (0.0)	0.2 (0.1)	6.8 (2.7)	21.7 (8.5)	106.7 (42.0)
Average precipitation days (≥ 0.2 mm)	13.9	10.7	11.5	13.8	12.9	11.0	10.7	11.0	13.1	14.1	14.3	13.8	150.7
Average rainy days (≥ 0.2 mm)	5.3	5.1	8.0	13.1	12.9	11.0	10.7	11.0	13.1	14.1	12.8	8.5	125.4
Average snowy days (≥ 0.2 cm)	9.3	6.4	4.7	0.89	0.05	0.0	0.0	0.0	0.0	0.05	2.0	6.6	29.9
Source: Environment Canada

== Demographics ==
=== City of Brant ===
In the 2021 Census of Population conducted by Statistics Canada, Brant had a population of 39,474 living in 14,330 of its 14,778 total private dwellings, a change of 10.8% from its 2016 population of 35,640. With a land area of 817.66 km^{2} (315.70 sq mi), it had a population density of 48.3/km^{2} (125.0/sq mi) in 2021.

Canada census – Brant community profile

	2021	2016	2011
Population	39,474 (+10.8% from 2016)	36,707 (3.0% from 2011)	35,638 (3.6% from 2006)
Land area	817.66 km^{2} (315.70 sq mi)	843.25 km^{2} (325.58 sq mi)	843.29 km^{2} (325.60 sq mi)
Population density	48.3/km^{2} (125/sq mi)	43.5/km^{2} (113/sq mi)	42.3/km^{2} (110/sq mi)
Median age	44.0 (M: 43.2, F: 44.8)
Private dwellings	14,778 (total) 14,330 (occupied)	13,687 (total)
Median household income	$106,000

References: 2021 2016 2011

Panethnic groups in the City of Brant (2001−2021)
Panethnic group	2021		2016		2011		2006		2001	
Panethnic group	Pop.	%	Pop.	%	Pop.	%	Pop.	%	Pop.	%
European (Note: Statistic includes all persons that did not make up part of a visible minority or an indigenous identity.)	35,190	90.93%	34,130	95.18%	33,475	95.47%	33,045	97.25%	30,415	97.39%
Indigenous	920	2.38%	935	2.61%	950	2.71%	425	1.25%	440	1.41%
South Asian	995	2.57%	195	0.54%	95	0.27%	130	0.38%	110	0.35%
African	640	1.65%	220	0.61%	270	0.77%	120	0.35%	120	0.38%
Southeast Asian (Note: Statistic includes total responses of "Filipino" and "Southeast Asian" under visible minority section on census.)	230	0.59%	85	0.24%	55	0.16%	40	0.12%	10	0.03%
Latin American	200	0.52%	60	0.17%	75	0.21%	30	0.09%	35	0.11%
East Asian (Note: Statistic includes total responses of "Chinese", "Korean", and "Japanese" under visible minority section on census.)	195	0.5%	185	0.52%	65	0.19%	105	0.31%	55	0.18%
Middle Eastern (Note: Statistic includes total responses of "West Asian" and "Arab" under visible minority section on census.)	120	0.31%	15	0.04%	0	0%	45	0.13%	65	0.21%
Other (Note: Statistic includes total responses of "Visible minority, n.i.e." and "Multiple visible minorities" under visible minority section on census.)	215	0.56%	45	0.13%	40	0.11%	45	0.13%	0	0%
Total responses	38,700	98.04%	35,860	97.69%	35,065	98.39%	33,980	98.74%	31,230	98.61%
Total population	39,474	100%	36,707	100%	35,638	100%	34,415	100%	31,669	100%
Note: Totals greater than 100% due to multiple origin responses

=== County of Brant ===
Panethnic groups in the County of Brant (2001−2021)
Panethnic group	2021		2016		2011		2006		2001	
Panethnic group	Pop.	%	Pop.	%	Pop.	%	Pop.	%	Pop.	%
European	117,300	82.31%	115,090	87.03%	114,670	85.72%	112,295	91.06%	108,540	92.96%
South Asian	7,065	4.96%	3,310	2.5%	1,735	1.3%	1,785	1.45%	1,345	1.15%
Indigenous	6,840	4.8%	6,910	5.23%	11,625	8.69%	4,305	3.49%	3,300	2.83%
African	4,215	2.96%	2,230	1.69%	1,820	1.36%	1,700	1.38%	1,220	1.04%
Southeast Asian	2,610	1.83%	1,890	1.43%	1,250	0.93%	1,240	1.01%	1,050	0.9%
East Asian	1,215	0.85%	1,245	0.94%	1,175	0.88%	1,040	0.84%	720	0.62%
Latin American	1,105	0.78%	505	0.38%	435	0.33%	390	0.32%	170	0.15%
Middle Eastern	1,030	0.72%	505	0.38%	670	0.5%	270	0.22%	200	0.17%
Other	1,130	0.79%	550	0.42%	395	0.3%	285	0.23%	195	0.17%
Total responses	142,515	98.44%	132,245	98.1%	133,780	98.34%	123,315	98.57%	116,755	98.54%
Total population	144,771	100%	134,808	100%	136,035	100%	125,099	100%	118,485	100%
Note: Totals greater than 100% due to multiple origin responses

== Government ==
The County of Brant is divided into five wards, each with two elected Councillors. David Bailey was elected as the Mayor in 2018. Previously, Ronald Eddy had held the position of Mayor from 1999 - 2018. The County is a single-tier municipality and provide the following services: roads, water, wastewater, garbage, recycling, facilities, parks, trails, planning, building, economic development, tourism, bylaw enforcement, library, fire and paramedic services but contracts with the Ontario Provincial Police to provide police services, overseen by the Police Services Board. (Ambulance services are provided in conjunction with the City of Brantford.) The customer service offices are located in Burford, Paris, Oakland, Onondaga and St. George Ontario.

== Local organizations ==
Local organizations include the Kinsmen Club of Brantford is an all Canadian non-profit service organization that promotes service, fellowship, positive values, and national pride. They put on the Brantford Kinsmen Annual Car Show & Swap Meet in Paris Ontario in September and the Brantford Kinsmen Annual Ribfest in Brantford, Ontario to help raise funds for local charities. And Sustainable Brant dedicated to saving the disappearing farmland.

The County of Brant Public Library is the public library serving the communities in the county of Brant, Ontario, Canada. It has 5 branches located in Paris, Burford, Scotland, St. George, and Glen Morris, Ontario. The system's main branch, in Paris, Ontario, was originally a Carnegie Library, having received an endowment from Carnegie in 1902.

== Album of honour ==
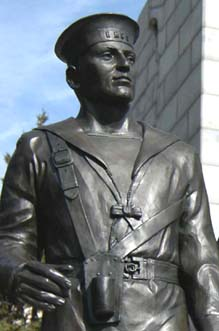
War Monument in Brantford, Ontario

The Album of Honour for Brant County is a book compiled in 1946 by the Kinsmen Club of Brantford to commemorate those of Brantford, the County of Brant and the peoples of the Six Nations who served Canada during the Second World War. The book lists the names of the Brant County men and women who served in World War II. There are more than 3,500 photographs. In addition, local companies provided the names of employees who served in this war. The book is kept on the Digital Archives Page at the Brantford Public Library.

== See also ==
- List of townships in Ontario
- List of secondary schools in Ontario#Brant County
