= Kenilworth, Ontario =

- Unincorporated rural community
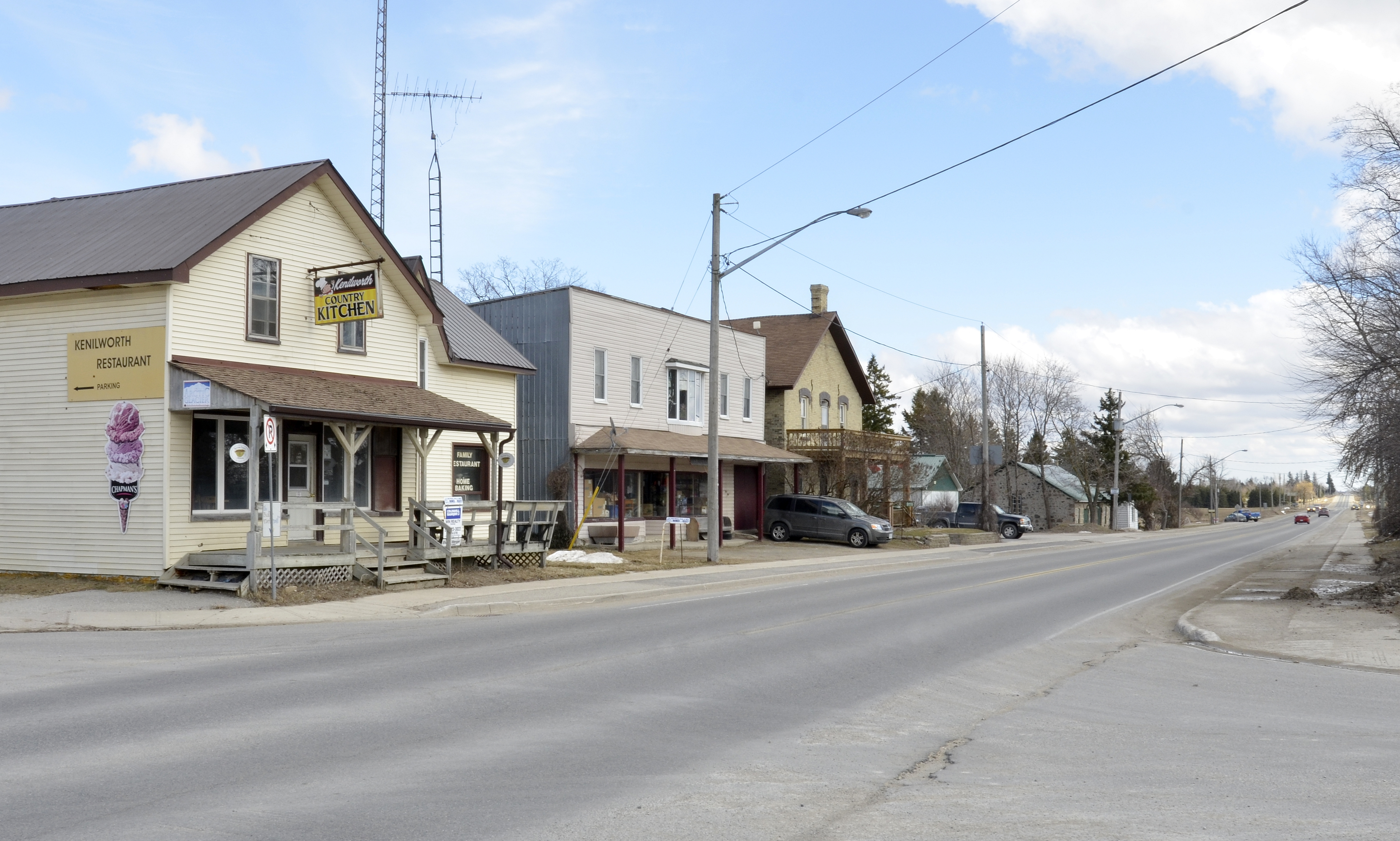
- Highway 6 in Kenilworth

- Location within Canada Location within Ontario
- Coordinates: 43°53′52″N 80°37′55″W
- Country: Canada
- Province: Ontario
- County: Wellington
- Township: Wellington North, Ontario
- Time zone: UTC-5 (Eastern (EST))
  - Summer (DST): UTC-4 (EDT)
- GNBC Code: FBTWC

Kenilworth is an unincorporated rural community in Wellington North Township, Wellington County, Ontario, Canada. Kenilworth was located in Arthur Township until 1999.

A post office has operated continuously in Kenilworth since 1848.

== History ==
Kenilworth is named for a pioneer storekeeper who immigrated from Kenilworth, England.

Many of the first settlers in Arthur Township were very poor, and moved here because the land was inexpensive. Among them were a number of Irish Catholics, and some German Catholics. Members of the Jesuit Order established the township's first Catholic church at Kenilworth in 1852. The log church served whole township until 1857, when a Catholic church was established in the village of Arthur. The Kenilworth church closed in 1870 after being condemned as structurally unsound. In 1903, a Catholic church called Sacred Heart re-established in Kenilworth.

A Methodist church and cemetery were established in Kenilworth prior to 1854. Called Ebenezer Church, it was built from logs, and was replaced in 1885 by a red brick church. The congregation merged with the United Church in 1925. Kenilworth United Church closed in 2001 and was demolished. The cemetery also closed; the last inscription being from 2006. A cairn was erected at the cemetery displaying a memorial plaque and the church's cornerstone.

By 1869, Kenilworth had a general store, tailor, doctor, saloon, wagon maker, hotel and post office. The population was 50.

The Toronto, Grey and Bruce Railway established a line through Kenilworth in 1872. Despite having a population at that time of just 75 people, Arthur Township made it conditional that in order to receive funding, the railway had to erect a station at Kenilworth. The railway has since been abandoned and the tracks removed.

By 1910, Kenilworth had a bank and telegraph office, and a population of 100. That same year, a steam boiler at a grist mill in Kenilworth exploded causing extensive damage.

The administrative offices of the Township of Wellington North are today located in Kenilworth.

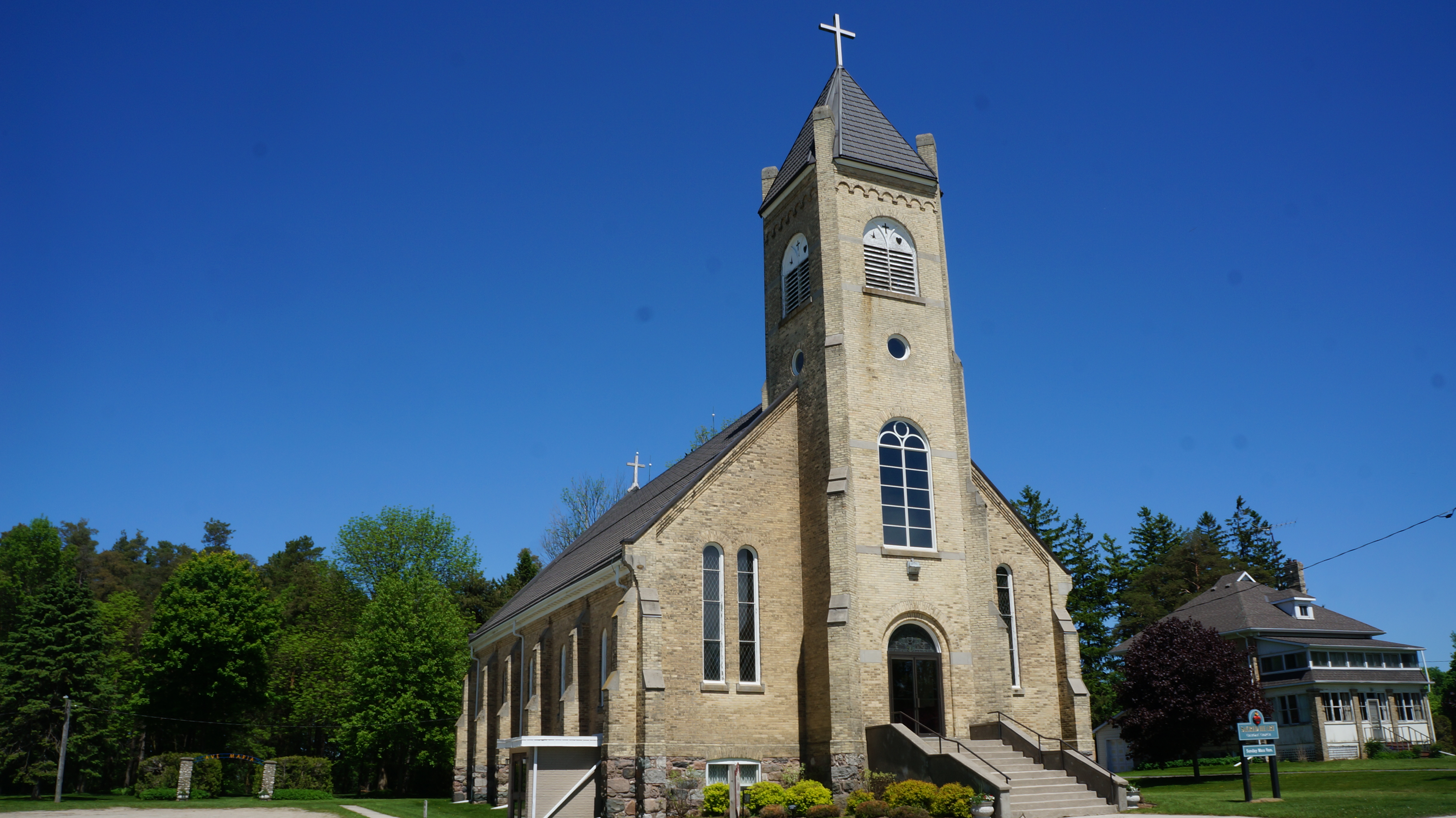
Sacred Heart Roman Catholic Church

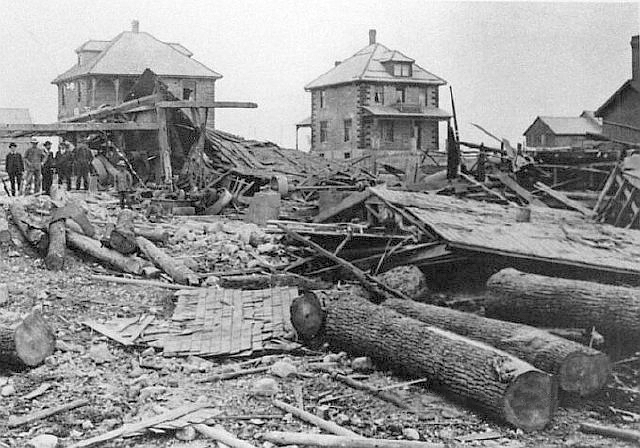
Following an explosion at a grist mill in Kenilworth, 1910

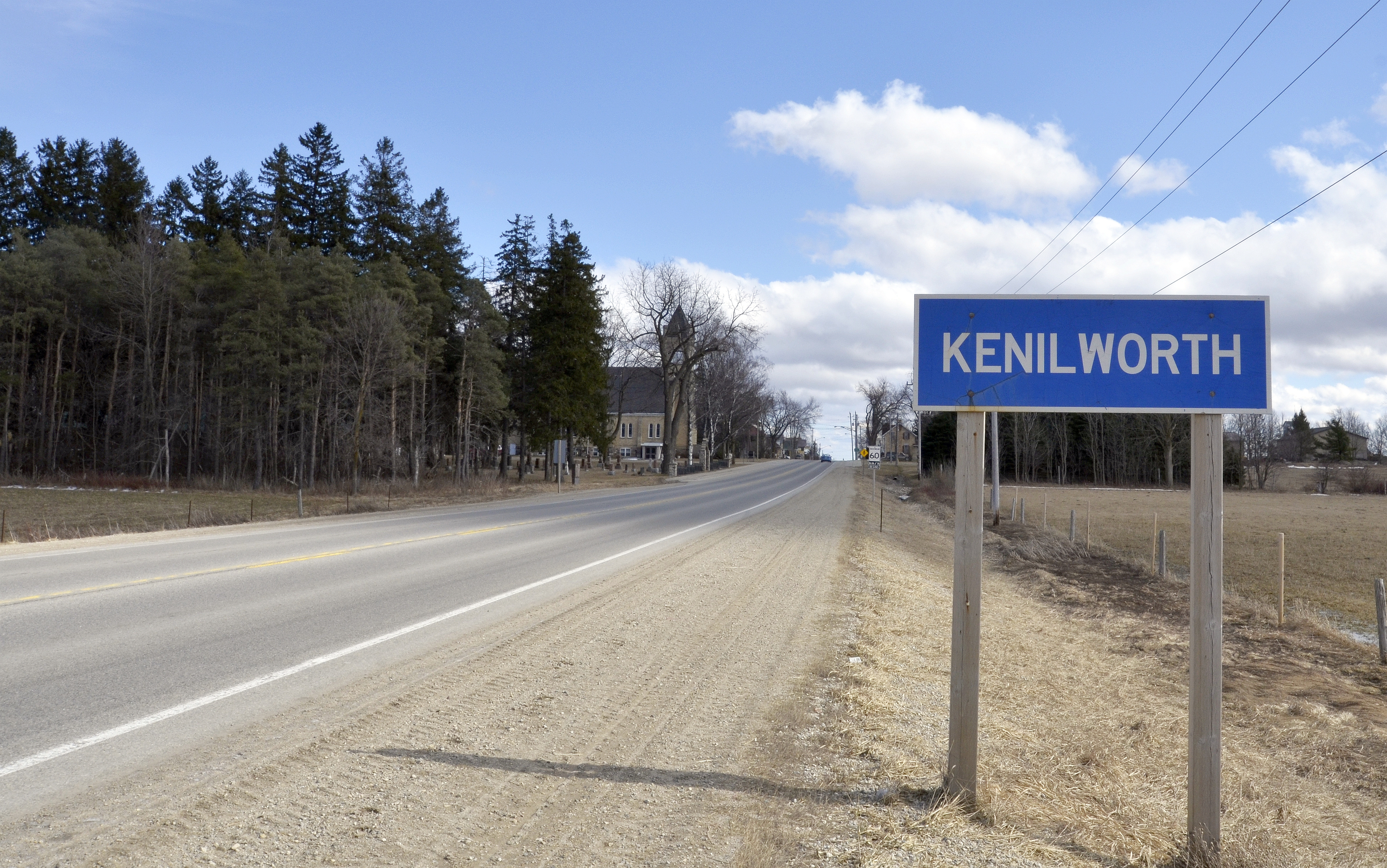
North of Kenilworth

== Culture ==
=== Lynes Blacksmith Shop ===
The Lynes Blacksmith Shop was a forge and carriage works from 1883 until it closed down in 1955. The building was left undisturbed for more than 60 years. In 2017, the shop re-opened and now provides historical tours of the blacksmith shop, the family home full of historical photos, a unique village barn and grounds with a nature trail.

== Education ==
=== Upper Grand District School Board ===
Kenilworth is served by the Upper Grand District School Board as Kenilworth Public School is a K-6 school located in the settlement. Grade 7-8 students attend Arthur Public School in Arthur or Victoria Cross Public School in Mount Forest. Local high school students attend Wellington Heights Secondary School, which is also located in Mount Forest. French immersion students from Kenilworth are assigned to Palmerston Public School in Palmerston, Ontario when in K-8. French immersion high school students attend Norwell District Secondary School, also located in Palmerston, when in grades 9-12.

=== Wellington Catholic District School Board ===
Kenilworth is served by the Wellington Catholic District School Board as St. John Catholic Elementary School is a K-8 school located in Arthur. Local high school students in the WCDSB are bussed to Saint James Catholic High School in Guelph. From 1962 to 2008, Sacred Heart School was the Catholic elementary school in Kenilworth.

== Fire and emergency services ==
- Ambulance: ambulance service in Kenilworth is provided by the Guelph-Wellington Paramedic Service. The headquarters for GWPS is located in Guelph and the closest GWPS stations to Kenilworth are located in Arthur and Mount Forest.
- Fire services: residents of Kenilworth are served by the Wellington North Fire Service. The WNFS is a volunteer fire service, with approximately 50 volunteer fire fighters. The closest fire stations are located in Arthur and Mount Forest.
- Police: the Ontario Provincial Police provides service for Kenilworth. There isn't an operation centre located within the community. The OPP operation centre that serves Kenilworth is located in Teviotdale.

== Health care ==
Kenilworth does not have a hospital located within the community, however, there are hospitals nearby. Louise Marshall Hospital is located in Mount Forest, Palmerston and District Hospital is located in Palmerston and Groves Memorial Community Hospital is located in Fergus. These hospitals are a part of the Wellington Health Care Alliance.

== Media ==
- Print media: print media coverage in Kenilworth comes from The North Wellington Community News and the Wellington Advertiser.
- Radio: while Kenilworth does not have their own radio station, 88.7 The River (CIWN-FM) from nearby Mount Forest serves the Wellington North area.
- Television: CTV Kitchener (CKCO-DT) provides local news for Kenilworth and area.

== Transportation ==
Kenilworth sits at the junction of Ontario Highway 6 (north−south) and Wellington North Township sideroad 7 (east−west).

- Air: the closest major airports to Kenilworth is the Region of Waterloo International Airport located in Woolwich. and Toronto Pearson International Airport located in Mississauga.
- Bus: the Guelph Owen Sound Transit (GOST) bus service drives through Kenilworth, however, the community does not have a stop. This service connects the area with the cities of Guelph and Owen Sound. The closest stops to Kenilworth are located in Arthur and Mount Forest. The bus service also includes stops in Chatsworth, Williamsford, Durham, Fergus and Elora.
- Rail: the closest train station to Kenilworth is Guelph Central Station in Guelph. At this location, Via Rail along the Quebec City-Windsor Corridor and GO Transit along the Kitchener line is offered.
- RIDE WELL: RIDE WELL is an on-demand, publicly-funded, rural transit service offering service that is available in Kenilworth, as well as throughout Wellington County and in the city of Guelph.

== Notable people ==
- Arthur Cushing (1869 – 1944), politician
- William Henry Cushing (1852 – 1934), Alberta's first Minister of Public Works and the 11th mayor of Calgary.
- George Epoch (1920 – 1986), priest
- Albert Hellyer (1860 – 1945), member of the Legislative Assembly of Ontario, representing the United Farmers of Ontario. Uncle of Frank Prewett.
- Frank Prewett (1893 – 1962), poet.
