= Mount Forest, Ontario =

Mount Forest
- Unincorporated community
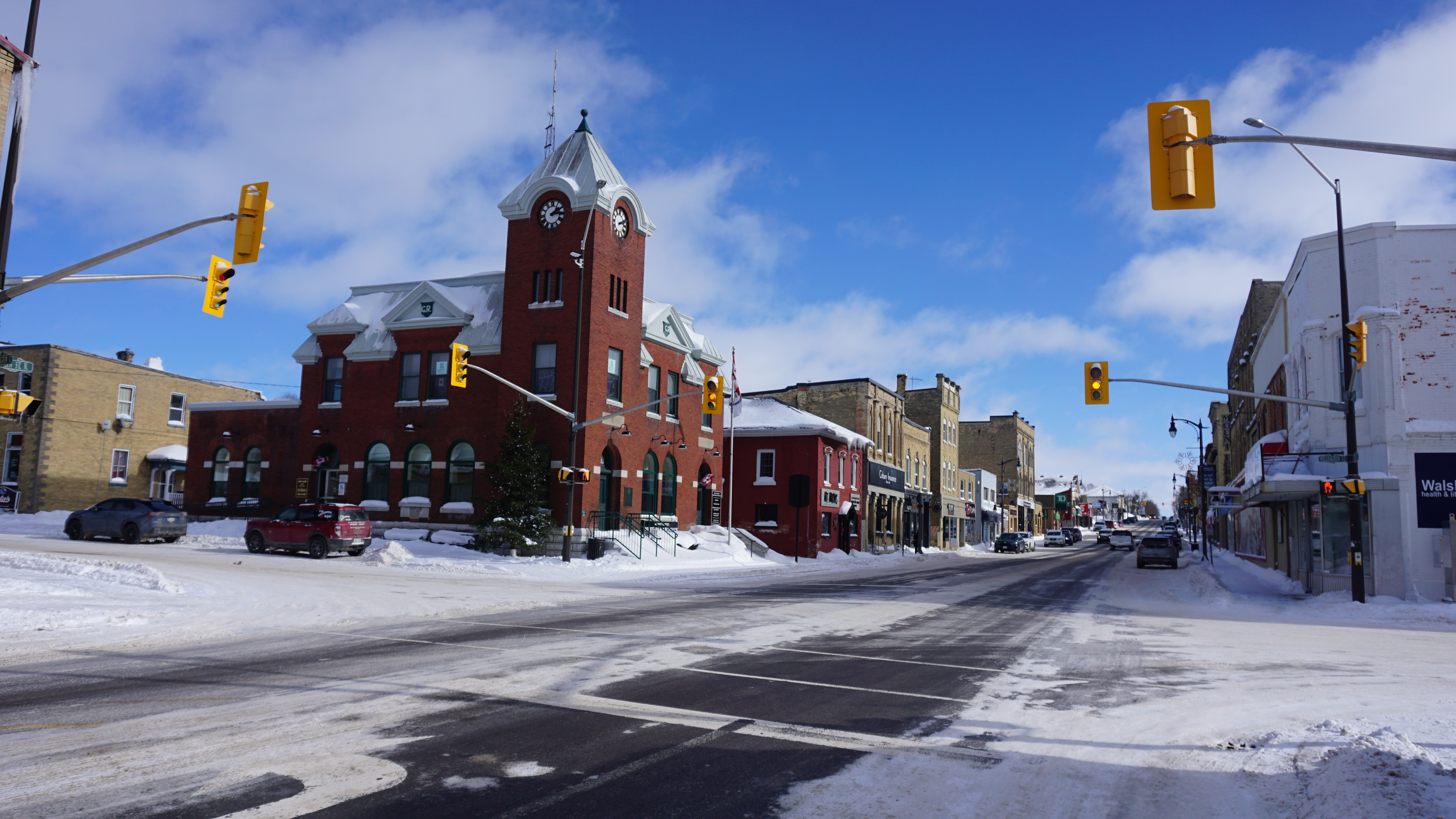
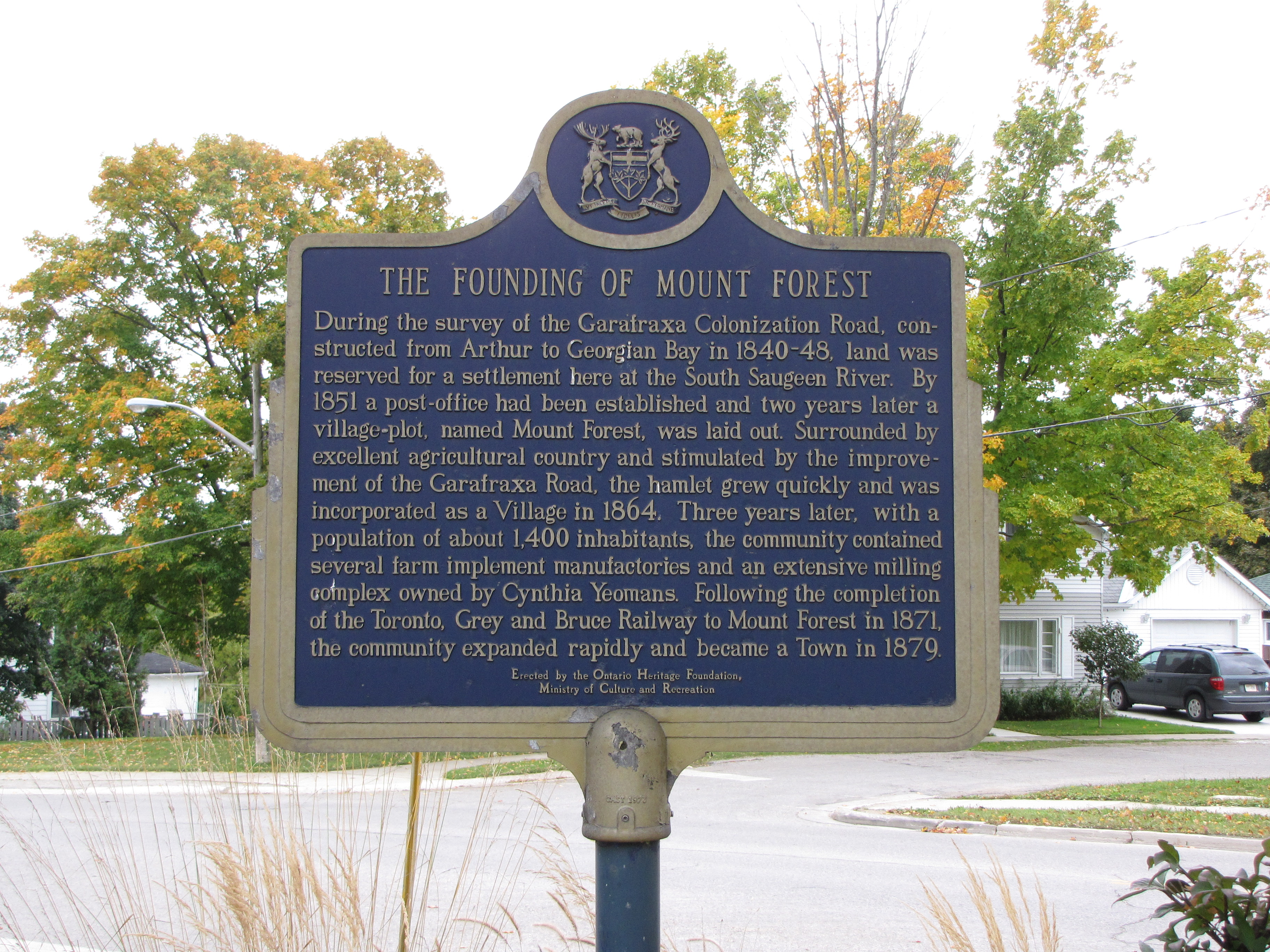
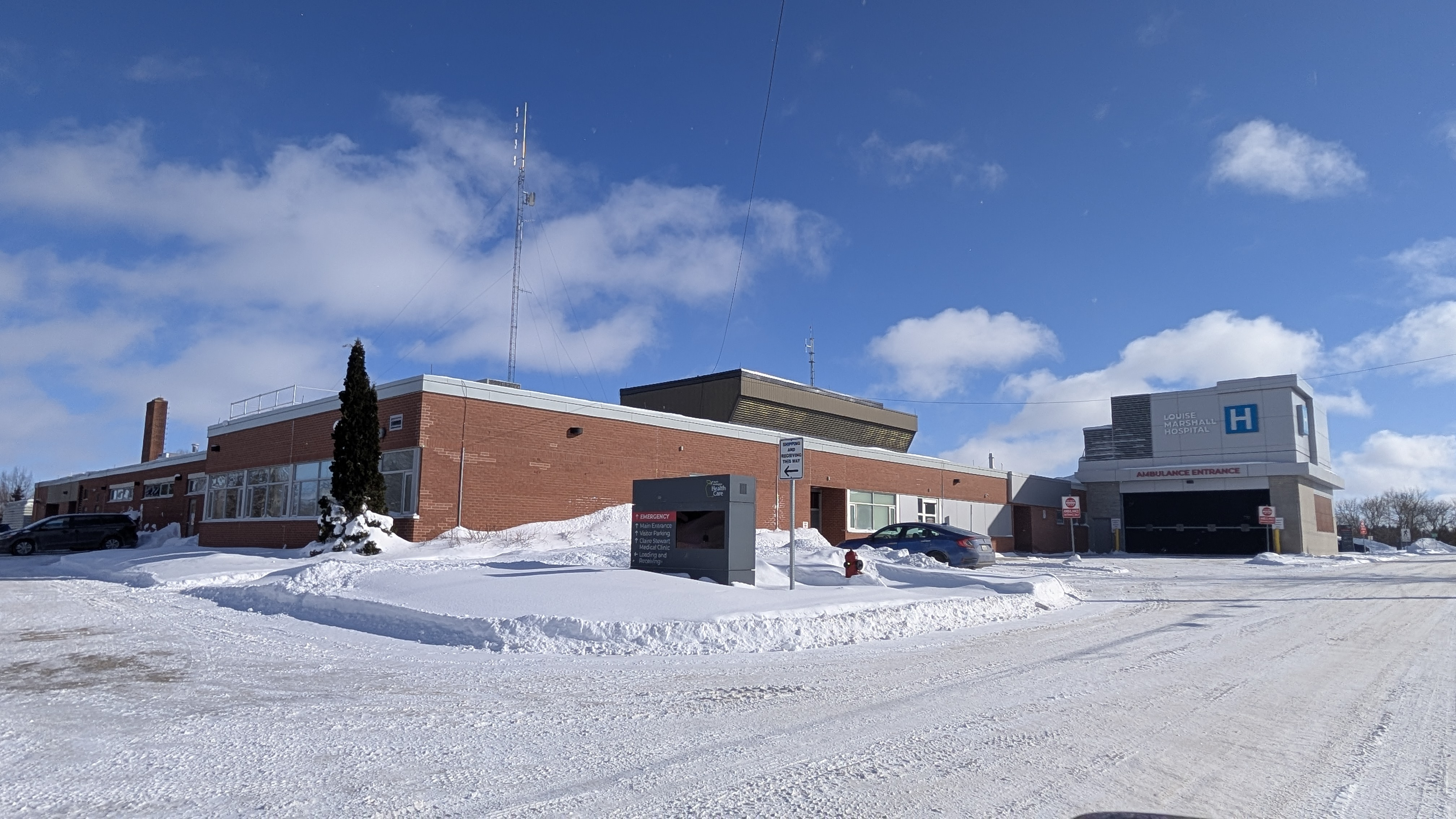
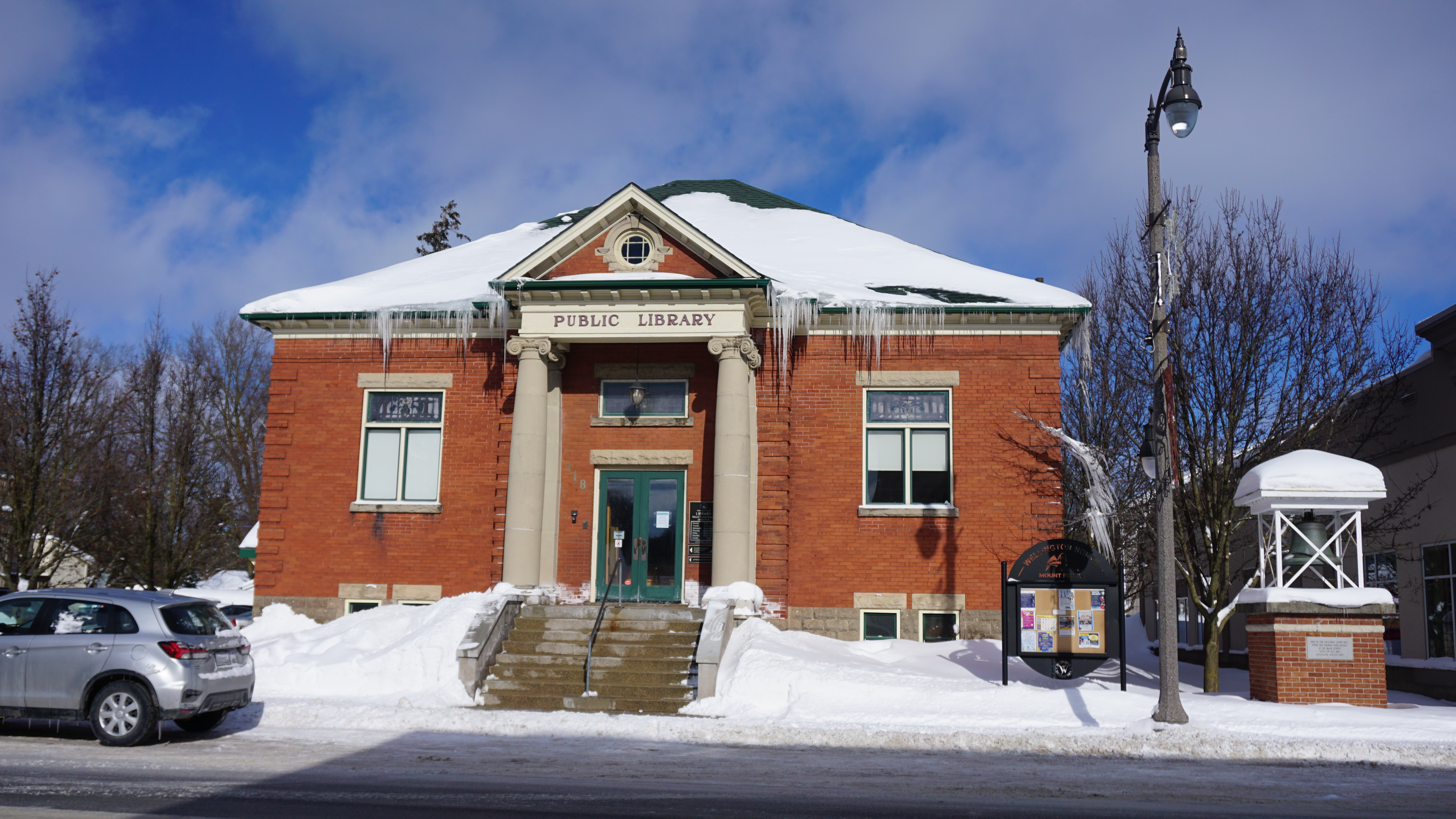
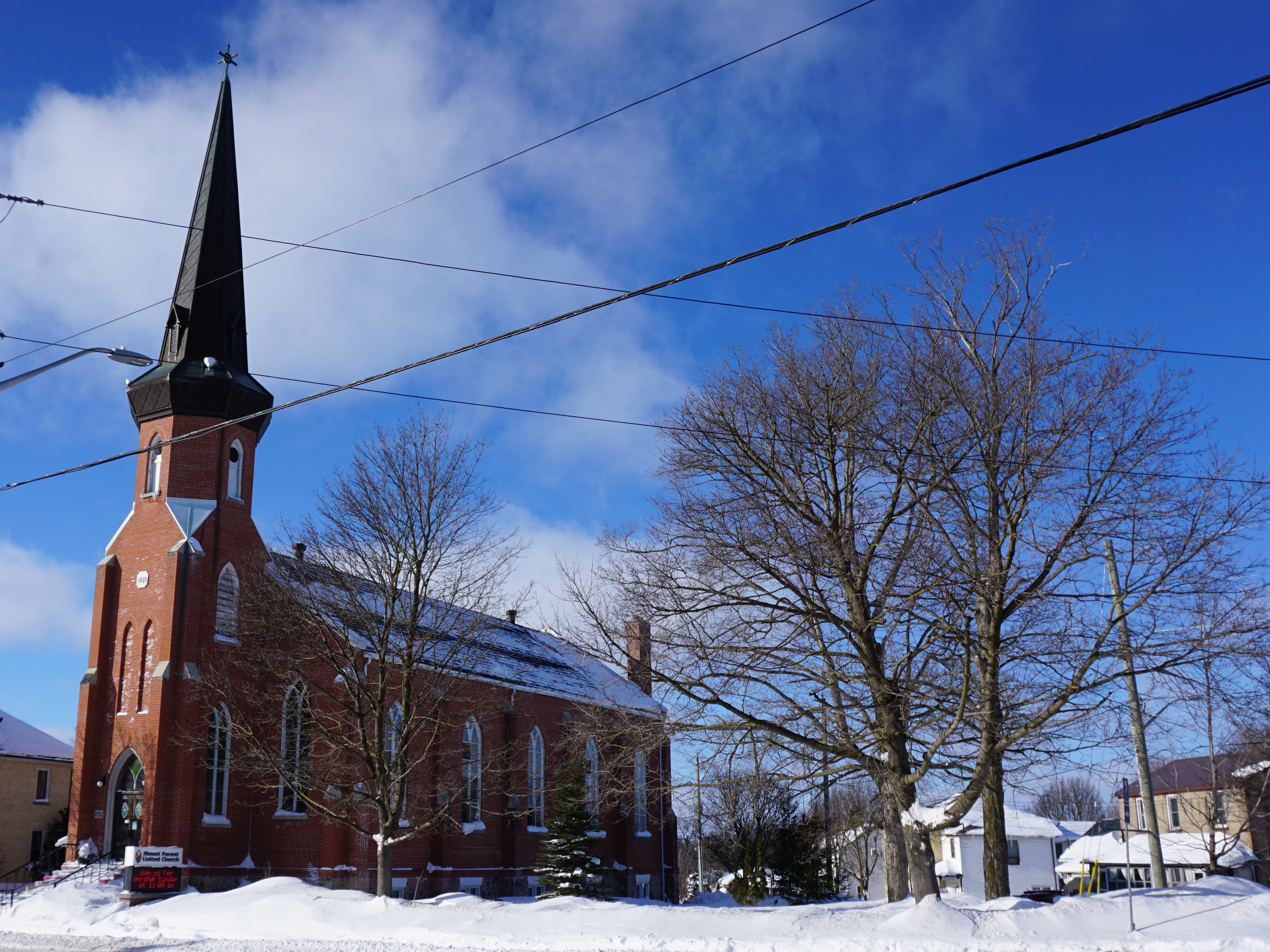
- Downtown Mount Forest in February 2026. Mount Forest Plaque Louise Marshall Hospital Wellington County Library, Mount Forest Branch Mount Forest United Church
- Interactive map of Mount Forest
- Coordinates: 43°58′54″N 80°44′12″W
- Country: Canada
- Province: Ontario
- County: Wellington County
- Township: Wellington North

Area
  - Total: 3.725 km^{2} (1.438 sq mi)

Population (2021)
  - Total: 5,040
  - Density: 1,352.9/km^{2} (3,504/sq mi)
- Time zone: UTC-5 (EST)
  - Summer (DST): UTC-4 (EDT)
- Forward sortation area: N0G
- Area codes: 519 and 226
- NTS Map: 40P15 Palmerston
- GNBC Code: FCFAL
- Highways: Highway 6 Highway 89
- Website: mountforest.ca

Mount Forest is a community in Wellington County, Ontario, Canada. It is located at the junction of Highway 6 and Highway 89 and is a part of the township of Wellington North, Ontario, Canada. As of the 2021 Canadian census the population of Mount Forest was 5,040.

== History ==
During the survey of the Garafraxa Colonization Road, constructed from Arthur to Georgian Bay in 1840–48, land was reserved for a settlement. By 1851 a post office was established. The village was originally known as Maitland Hills, because it was believed to be on the Maitland River system. This was incorrect; the village is on a height of land near the headwaters of the South Saugeen River.

The settlement was surveyed into lots in 1853 by Francis Kerr, a provincial land surveyor, with the village-plot named Mount Forest. The village straddled the Garafraxa Road leading to early growth. When the United Counties of Wellington and Grey was dissolved in January 1854, Wellington and Grey were separate counties for all purposes, with the village in Arthur Township, Wellington County for electoral purposes. By 1864, the population had grown to 1185 so that it qualified to be incorporated as a village. In 1869, Mount Forest was listed as an "incorporated Village in the Townships of Egremont, Normanby and Arthur" in the County of Wellington, as being "one of the most enterprising villages in the West" with a population of 1700. The townships of Egremont and Normanby were north of town in adjacent Grey County, while south of the town was Arthur Township.

The 1871 town directory stated that Mount Forest had ten hotels, eight churches and 18 stores. Later that year the Toronto, Grey and Bruce Railway was completed and the first train entered Mount Forest pulled by a wood-burning engine. By 1879, Mount Forest had become an incorporated town.

Mount Forest was amalgamated into the new township of Wellington North on 1 January 1999.

=== Media ===
A local newspaper, the Mount Forest Confederate, was first printed in 1867. For the first year, the newspaper was sent to village residents free of charge, then in the second year for 50 cents annually. It ceased publication in August 2019.

=== Hospital ===
Dr. A.R. Perry purchased the home of Alex Martin on the corner of Dublin and Princess Streets and established Strathcona Hospital, a 10-bed private hospital. In 1923, a group of citizens headed by G.L. Allen changed Strathcona Hospital into a public hospital. Wentworth Marshall, a pharmacist, generously bought the hospital from Perry. Marshall's mother, Louise, was the supervisor at the hospital until she became ill with cancer. It was closed in 1921, but a year later reopened under a new name: Mount Forest General Hospital. In 1928, the deed of the hospital was turned over to the town and the name was changed yet again to Louise Marshall Hospital in honour of Marshall's mother.

=== Education ===
The first public school was built in 1856. The first high school was originally in the Old Drill Hall, but was an unsuitable location because it was beside the Market Square where livestock sales were held monthly.

The new high school was built in 1878. A third high school was founded in 2004, with students from the neighbouring town of Arthur joining those from the Mount Forest district.

== Climate ==
Mount Forest features a humid continental climate, characterized by warm, humid sometimes wet summers and long, cold, snowy winters. At an elevation of 430 meters (1,410 ft) above sea level, Mount Forest is one of the highest towns in Southern Ontario being located in the western portion of the Dundalk Highlands. As such, its elevation and location downwind of Lake Huron makes it prone to hefty snow totals from lake effect snow averaging nearly 300 centimetres per year. Summers are often cooler than they otherwise would be due to the town's elevation and overnight lows are considerably cooler than places along the lakeshore.

Climate data for Mount Forest, Ontario (1991–2020 normals, extremes 1889–present)
Month	Jan	Feb	Mar	Apr	May	Jun	Jul	Aug	Sep	Oct	Nov	Dec	Year
Record high °C (°F)	15.6 (60.1)	13.7 (56.7)	25.7 (78.3)	29.0 (84.2)	34.4 (93.9)	35.0 (95.0)	36.7 (98.1)	36.1 (97.0)	35.6 (96.1)	29.4 (84.9)	22.8 (73.0)	18.0 (64.4)	36.7 (98.1)
Mean daily maximum °C (°F)	−3.3 (26.1)	−2.6 (27.3)	2.5 (36.5)	10.2 (50.4)	17.7 (63.9)	22.8 (73.0)	25.1 (77.2)	24.2 (75.6)	20.5 (68.9)	13.0 (55.4)	5.5 (41.9)	−0.5 (31.1)	11.2 (52.2)
Daily mean °C (°F)	−7.1 (19.2)	−6.9 (19.6)	−2.0 (28.4)	5.0 (41.0)	12.0 (53.6)	17.3 (63.1)	19.4 (66.9)	18.7 (65.7)	15.1 (59.2)	8.5 (47.3)	2.0 (35.6)	−3.6 (25.5)	6.5 (43.7)
Mean daily minimum °C (°F)	−10.9 (12.4)	−11.1 (12.0)	−6.5 (20.3)	−0.2 (31.6)	6.4 (43.5)	11.7 (53.1)	13.6 (56.5)	13.1 (55.6)	9.6 (49.3)	4.1 (39.4)	−1.5 (29.3)	−6.7 (19.9)	1.8 (35.2)
Record low °C (°F)	−35.6 (−32.1)	−41.1 (−42.0)	−32.5 (−26.5)	−22.8 (−9.0)	−6.2 (20.8)	−3.3 (26.1)	0.6 (33.1)	−2.2 (28.0)	−5.0 (23.0)	−12.8 (9.0)	−27.2 (−17.0)	−31.1 (−24.0)	−41.1 (−42.0)
Average precipitation mm (inches)	92.1 (3.63)	73.2 (2.88)	68.0 (2.68)	73.8 (2.91)	98.4 (3.87)	99.5 (3.92)	97.8 (3.85)	84.0 (3.31)	85.2 (3.35)	81.1 (3.19)	91.6 (3.61)	89.8 (3.54)	1,034.5 (40.73)
Average rainfall mm (inches)	15.7 (0.62)	16.6 (0.65)	35.3 (1.39)	54.6 (2.15)	73.8 (2.91)	88.5 (3.48)	65.0 (2.56)	97.0 (3.82)	90.4 (3.56)	75.3 (2.96)	62.9 (2.48)	33.4 (1.31)	708.5 (27.89)
Average snowfall cm (inches)	71.8 (28.3)	54.1 (21.3)	41.8 (16.5)	18.4 (7.2)	1.9 (0.7)	0.0 (0.0)	0.0 (0.0)	0.0 (0.0)	0.0 (0.0)	7.7 (3.0)	34.1 (13.4)	68.0 (26.8)	297.8 (117.2)
Average precipitation days (≥ 0.2 mm)	22.2	18.7	16.4	13.8	14.8	12.9	12.7	12.7	12.8	17.6	18.9	21.0	194.4
Average rainy days (≥ 0.2 mm)	4	3	7	10	12	12	10	11	13	14	10	6	111
Average snowy days (≥ 0.2 cm)	21	16	12	5	0	0	0	0	0	2	9	19	85
Average relative humidity (%) (at 15:00 LST)	82.2	76.0	67.0	59.1	56.2	59.0	58.6	60.3	62.7	68.3	77.2	83.1	67.5
Mean monthly sunshine hours	69.3	106.8	135.4	185.6	242.0	261.8	289.2	251.5	167.1	139.4	58.6	54.7	1,961.4
Percentage possible sunshine	24.0	36.2	36.7	46.1	53.0	56.6	61.7	57.9	44.4	40.7	20.1	19.7	43.9
Source: Environment Canada (rainfall/snowfall 1961–1990, sun 1951–1980)

== Culture ==
Mount Forest's library was completed in 1913 with a grant of $10,000 from well-known philanthropist Andrew Carnegie. Mount Forest is also the site of the founding of the Society of Rural Physicians of Canada.

Mount Forest was the first place that Aimee Semple McPherson preached.

The Mount Forest Chamber of Commerce along with the Arthur and Minto Chambers formed a networking group named Northern Wellington Young Professionals in October 2012. This is a group of business owners, entrepreneurs, community leaders, and business leaders between 20 and 40 years old who get together for networking events. It gives local businesses within Northern Wellington Township an opportunity to grow their customer/client base and meet fellow young professionals within the community. Northern Wellington Young Professionals operates out of Mount Forest but holds events in Harriston and Arthur as well.

== Demographics ==
Population history of Mount Forest
Year	Pop.	±%
1871	1,370	—
1881	2,170	+58.4%
1891	2,214	+2.0%
1901	2,019	−8.8%
1911	1,839	−8.9%
1921	1,718	−6.6%
1931	1,801	+4.8%
1941	1,892	+5.1%
1951	2,291	+21.1%
1961	2,623	+14.5%
1971	3,037	+15.8%
1981	3,320	+9.3%
1991	4,266	+28.5%
1996	4,530	+6.2%
2001	4,584	+1.2%
2006	4,490	−2.1%
2011	4,757	+5.9%
2016	4,643	−2.4%
2021	5,040	+8.6%

As of the 2021 Canadian Census, Mount Forest has a population of 5,040 people. This represents an increase of 8.6% when compared to the 2016 Canadian Census.

In the first Canadian census in 1871, Mount Forest had a population of 1,370.

Mount Forest saw a lot of growth in the late 19th century, as by 1891, the population of the town was 2,214 people.

From 1901 to 1921, the population of Mount Forest dropped significantly, dropping to a low of 1,718 in 1921.

Following World War II, Mount Forest saw a sharp increase in population, as from 1941-1951, the population rose by 21.1%. By 1971, Mount Forest had 3,037 living in the town.

Mount Forest saw significant growth during the 1980s, as the town population increased by nearly 1,000 people between 1981 and 1991.

Mount Forest's population broke over 5,000 people in the 2021, as 5,040 people live in the town.

As of the latest census in 2021, the median age in Mount Forest is 49.6 years old. There are 2,250 private dwellings in Mount Forest, with 2,174 of them occupied by usual residents.

The median total income for a household in Mount Forest was $90,000 in 2020.

== Education ==
=== Upper Grand District School Board ===
Mount Forest is served by the Upper Grand District School Board as Victoria Cross Public School is a K-8 school located on Durham Street. Local high school students attend Wellington Heights Secondary School on Sligo Road. French immersion students from Mount Forest are assigned to Palmerston Public School in Palmerston, Ontario when in K-8. French immersion high school students attend Norwell District Secondary School, which is also in Palmerston, when in grades 9-12.

=== Wellington Catholic District School Board ===
Mount Forest is served by the Wellington Catholic District School Board as St. Mary Catholic Elementary School is a K-8 school located on Parksdale Drive. Local high school students in the WCDSB are bussed to Saint James Catholic High School in Guelph.

=== Public library system ===
The Wellington County Library system consists of 14 branches throughout the county, including one in downtown Mount Forest on Main Street. This location opened in 1913 after Andrew Carnegie approved a grant of $10,000 and in 1912, Mrs. Luxton donated the site on east side of Main Street, in memory of her father.

=== Museums ===
The Mount Forest Museum & Archives is dedicated to help preserve the history of people and place in the Mount Forest area. The museum is located on Main Street in downtown Mount Forest.

== Fire and emergency services ==
=== Ambulance ===
Ambulance service in Mount Forest is provided by the Guelph-Wellington Paramedic Service. The headquarters for GWPS is located in Guelph and Mount Forest has one GWPS station located within the community.

=== Fire services ===
Residents of Mount Forest are served by the Wellington North Fire Service. The WNFS is a volunteer fire service, with approximately 50 volunteer fire fighters. Mount Forest has a fire station located within the community, Fire Station 120.

=== Police ===
The Ontario Provincial Police provides service for Mount Forest. There isn't an operation centre located within the community. The OPP operation centre that serves Mount Forest is located in Teviotdale.

== Media ==
=== Print media ===
The North Wellington Community News and Wellington Advertiser serve the community.

=== Radio ===
Mount Forest has one local radio station, as 88.7 The River (CIWN-FM) serves the area.

=== Television ===
CTV Kitchener (CKCO-DT) provides local news for Mount Forest and area.

== Sports ==
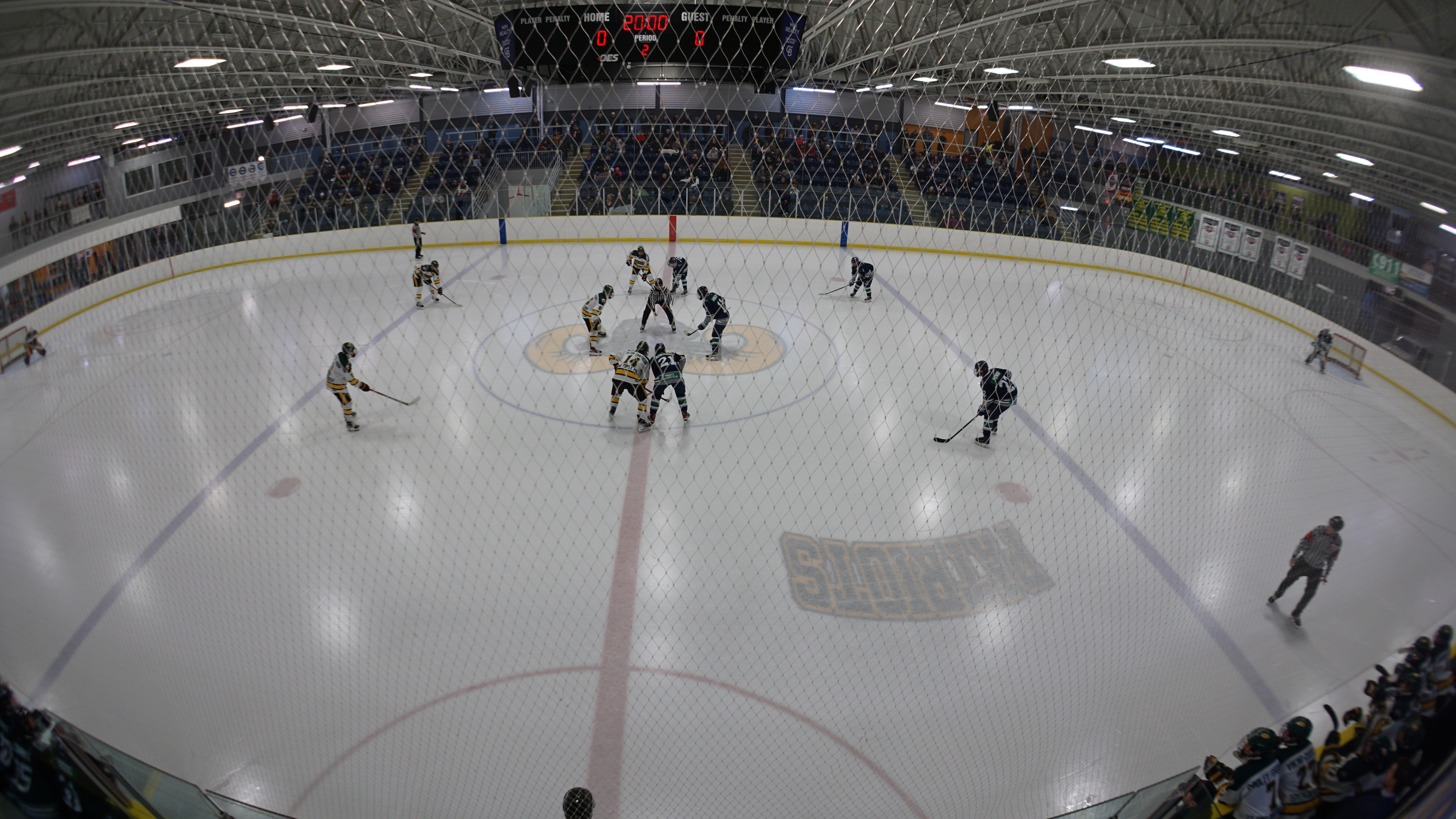
Mount Forest & District Community Centre

The Mount Forest and District Sports Complex opened in 2008. The arena features an NHL sized ice surface and an indoor walking track. The complex also has outdoor ball diamonds.

The Trillium 10k is an annual race held each may which features 10 km and 5 km races, a 5 km walk event, and a 10 km inline speed skating race. These races have been contested by members of the Canadian national team.

=== Ice hockey ===
The Mount Forest Patriots are a local junior "C" ice hockey club. The team plays in the PJHL and plays their home games at the Mount Forest and District Sports Complex.

=== Curling ===
The Mount Forest Curling Club is the local curling club for the community. The club is home to many curling leagues and hosts bonspiels throughout the curling season. In January 2025, the club hosted the Curling Ontario U-18 men's & women's championships.

== Churches ==
=== United Church of Canada ===
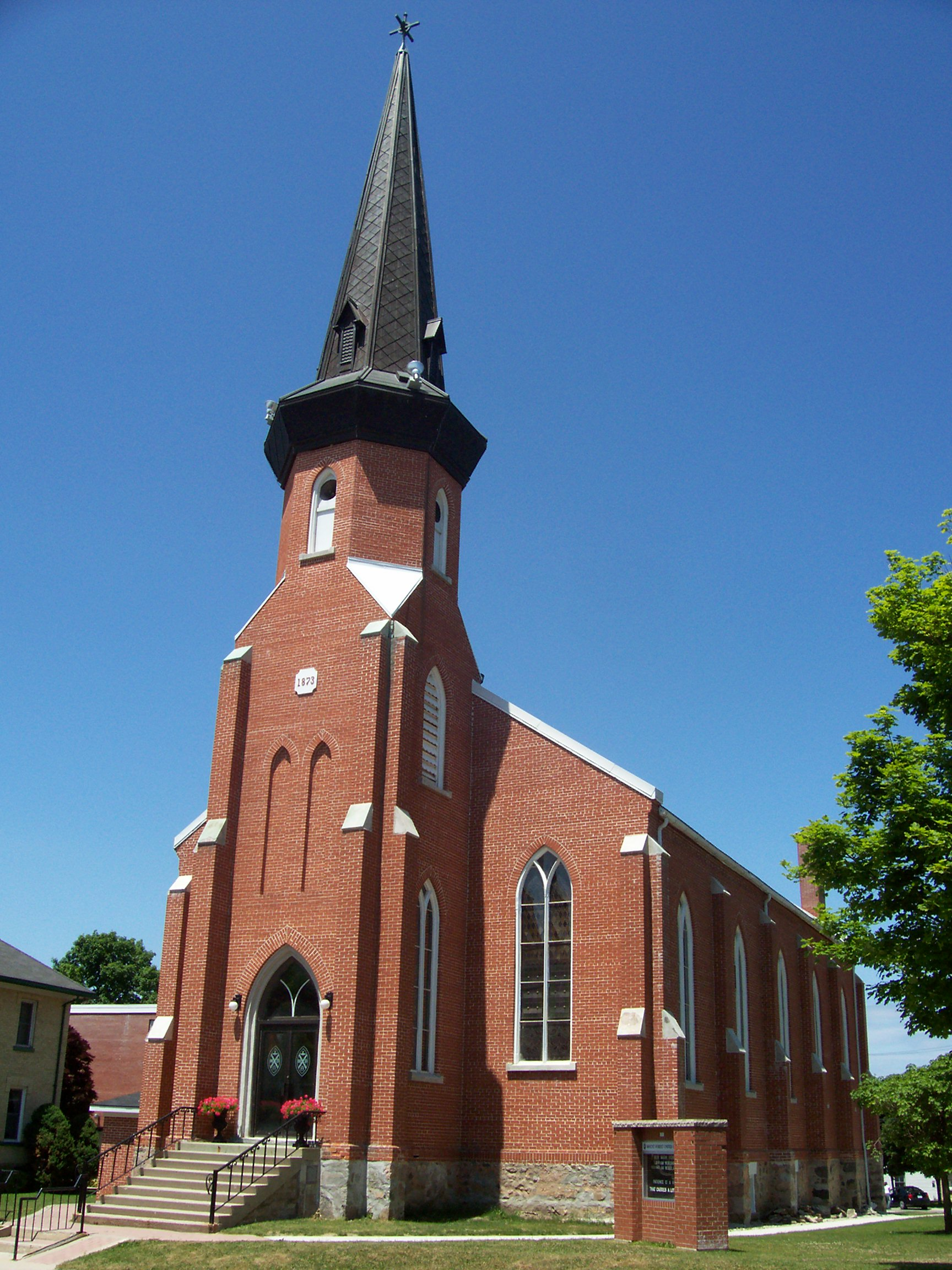
The Mount Forest United Church was built in 1873.

Built in 1873, Mount Forest United Church is an important part of the local history of Mount Forest and continues to be one of the most historic, and recognizable landmarks of the area. Today, Mount Forest United Church is one of two congregations in Mount Forest-Woodland Pastoral Charge of the United Church of Canada in what is now Western Ontario Waterways Regional Council (Region 8), and was formerly in Hamilton Conference.

=== Methodism ===
Methodist circuit riders first began ministering throughout the region in the 1840s, the first being the Reverend John Shilton in 1842. In 1844, Shilton led the construction of the first Methodist place of worship in Mount Forest, on the corner of Highway 6 and Sligo Road. Mount Forest became its own circuit in 1863 with 147 members. In 1852 the Wesleyan Methodist church was built, and in 1874 the two Methodist congregations merged and built a new church on Wellington Street and Elgin Street. Originally costing $16,000, 215 members contributed to the construction of this new building. In 1884, another Methodist community in the area joined this growing congregation. In 1925, the Methodist churches in Canada became one of the founding members of the new United Church of Canada. All of the buildings in Mount Forest which were at one time associated with these Methodist churches have been demolished.

=== Presbyterianism ===
Presbyterianism in Mount Forest can trace its roots to at least the early 1850s. In 1856 a request was sent to Hamilton Presbytery for a minister as well as permission to erect a church building. A split occurred shortly thereafter and subsequently two churches were built in town: Knox Presbyterian Church was built near the present-day Presbyterian Church, and Saint Andrew's Presbyterian which was built on the intersection of King Street and Fergus Street. In 1873 and under the guidance of the Reverend John MacMillan, Knox Presbyterian constructed a new church building, what is now known as Mount Forest United Church. The Grand Master of the Grand Lodge of Canada laid the corner stone and after the reuniting of the Presbyterian communities in Mount Forest, the name was changed to Westminster Presbyterian. The first organ was installed in 1890, but was replaced in 1910, and again in 1957. In 1925, Westminster Presbyterian joined the United Church of Canada (after a congregational vote of 255 to 32) and the Methodist communities joined them under this one roof.

=== Roman Catholicism ===
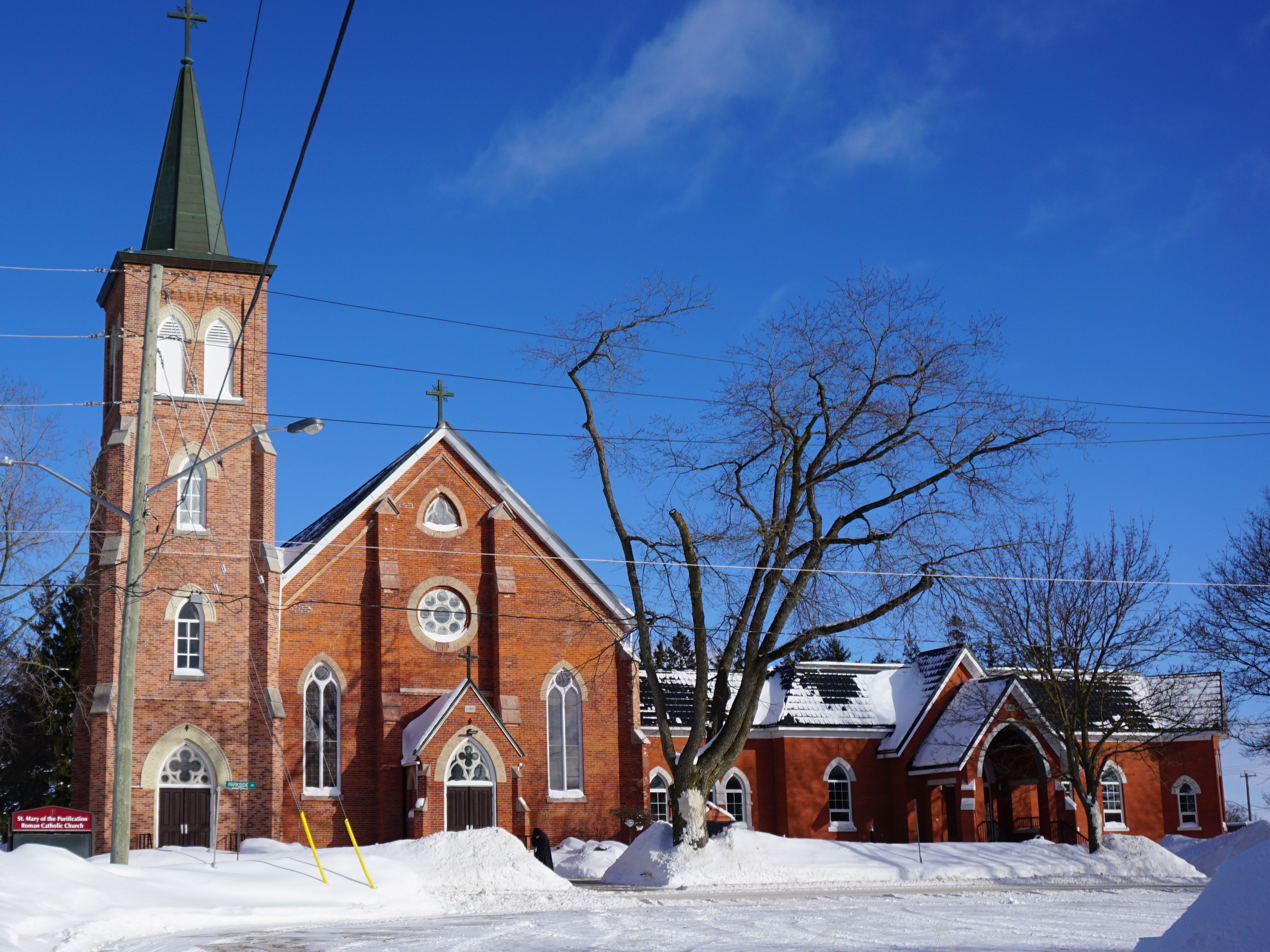

The first Roman Catholic church was a simple log church constructed in 1858, but burnt to the ground the day before its consecration. The current Roman Catholic Church, Saint Mary's, was constructed in 1864. Their first priest was Father P.S. Mahuet, and was consecrated by the Bishop of Hamilton, the Most Reverend Doctor Farrell. The rectory was built in 1880 and was converted into a convent housing the Sisters of Saint Joseph, though it was demolished in 2002 to create enough space for their new parish facilities.

== Transportation ==
Mount Forest sits at the junction of Ontario Highway 6 (north−south) and Ontario Highway 89 (east−west).

=== Air ===
Louise Marshall Hospital in Mount Forest has a private heliport that is used. The closest major airports to Mount Forest is the Region of Waterloo International Airport located in Woolwich. and Toronto Pearson International Airport located in Mississauga.

=== Bus ===
The Guelph Owen Sound Transit (GOST) bus service connects Mount Forest with nearby cities Guelph and Owen Sound. This service includes stops in Chatsworth, Williamsford, Durham, Arthur, Fergus and Elora.

=== Rail ===
The closest train station to Mount Forest is Guelph Central Station in Guelph. At this location, Via Rail along the Quebec City-Windsor Corridor and GO Transit along the Kitchener line is offered.

=== RIDE WELL ===
RIDE WELL is an on-demand, publicly-funded, rural transit service offering service that is available in Mount Forest, as well as throughout Wellington County and in the city of Guelph.

== Notable people ==
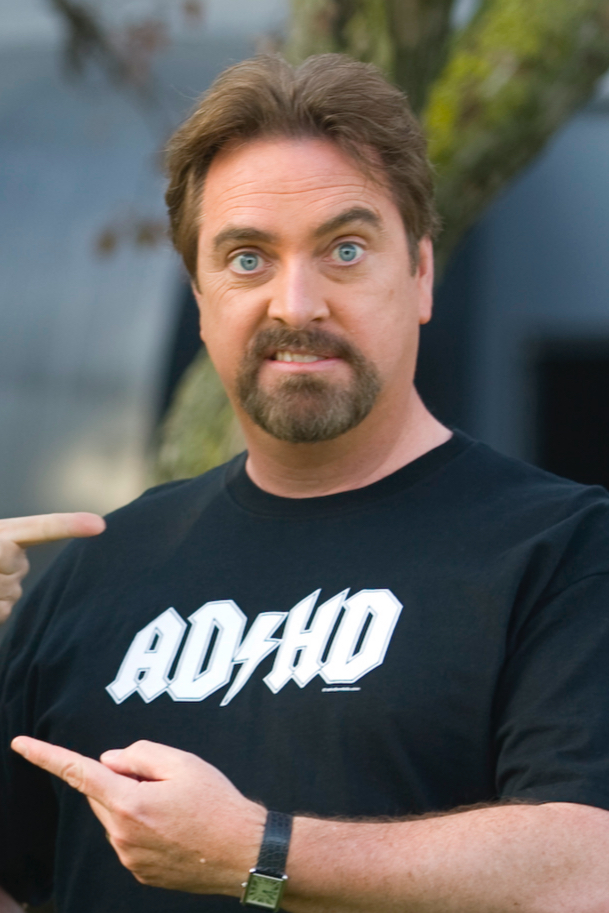
Patrick McKenna

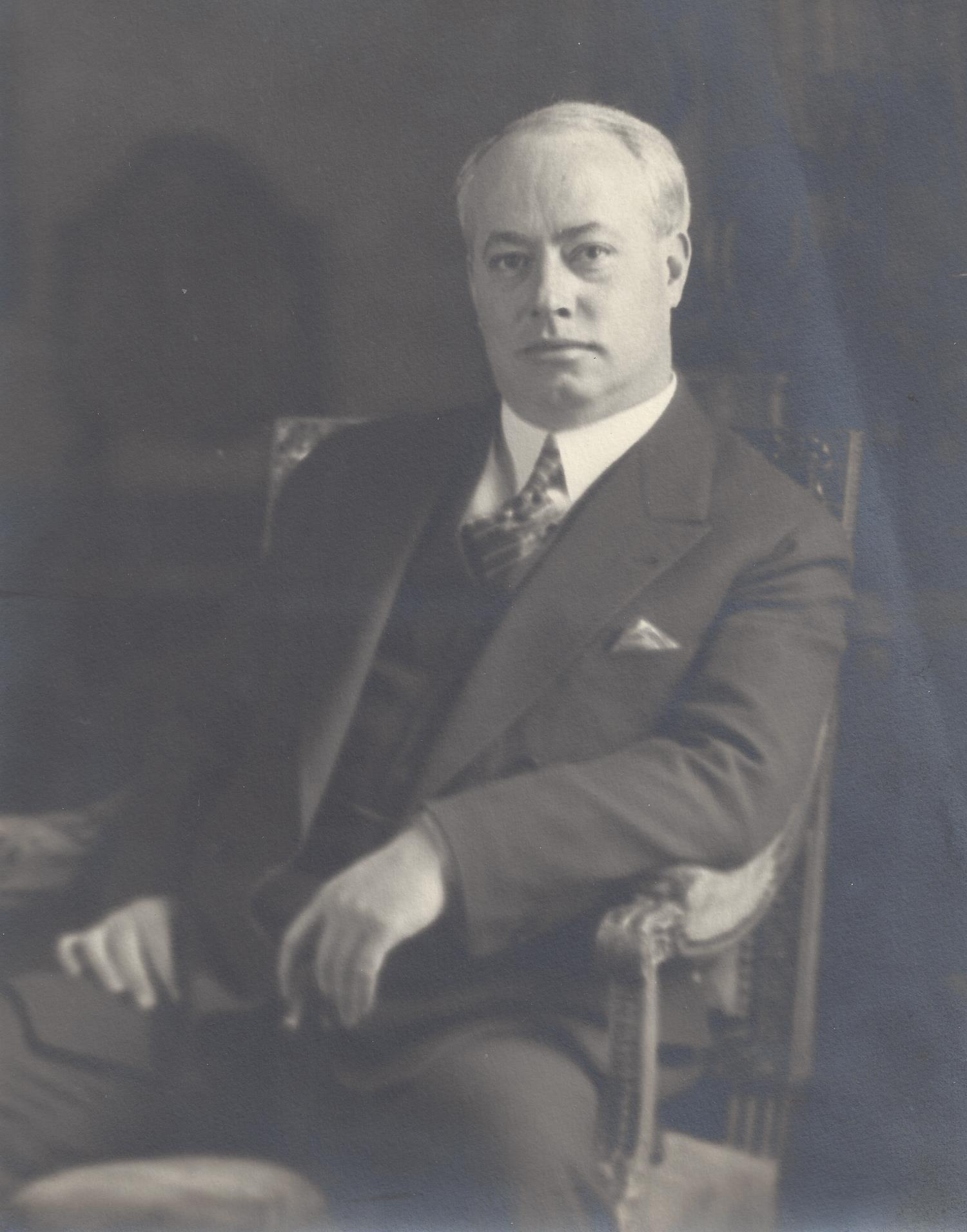
Jack Bickell

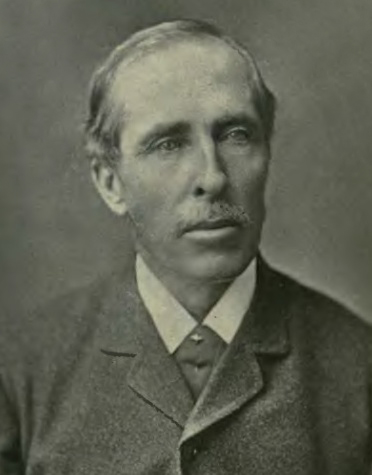
William Edwin Brooks

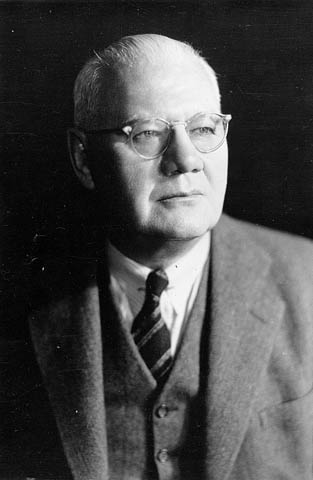
Norman Platt Lambert

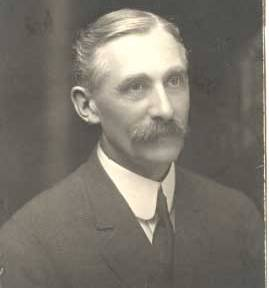
Robert Martin

=== Actors ===
- Dinah Christie (1942 – 2026), actress and singer best known as a regular performer on Party Game from 1970 – 1980
- Patrick McKenna (1960 – ), actor known as playing Harold Green from The Red Green Show and Marty Stevens on Traders

=== Artists ===
- Robert Markle (1936 – 1990), whose art work has been collected by the National Gallery of Art in Washington, D.C.

=== Business ===
- Alfred Ernest Ames (1866 – 1934), Ontario Bank manager who became the founder of the investment brokerage A. E. Ames & Company
- Jack Bickell (1884 – 1951), owner, president, chairman and director of the Toronto Maple Leafs from 1924 – 1951
- Charles A. Woodward (1852 – 1937), founder of Woodward's Department Store's Limited

=== Clergy ===
- Colin Johnson (1952 – ), former Anglican Archbishop of Toronto from 2009–2018.

=== Engineers ===
- Edward Robert Armstrong (1876 – 1955), engineer and inventor who proposed a series of "seadrome" floating airport platforms for transatlantic flights
- William Edwin Brooks (1828 – 1899), civil engineer with the railways in India from 1856 – 1881

=== Evangelists ===
- Aimee Semple McPherson (1890 – 1944), Pentecostal evangelist who founded Foursquare Church

=== Filmmakers ===
- Philip Hoffman (1955 – ), awarded the Governor General's Awards in Visual and Media Arts in 2016

=== Historians ===
- Kathleen Wood-Legh (1901 – 1981), specializing in medieval, social and economic history and founding member of Society of Women Members of the Regent House who are not Fellows of Colleges in 1950

=== Military ===
- Frederick William Campbell (1867 – 1915), Mount Forest born recipient of the Victoria Cross for actions in France during the First World War
- Charles Herbert Little (1907 – 2004), Director of Naval Intelligence during World War II

=== Missionaries ===
- Jean Dow (1870 – 1927), medical missionary who was one of the only women in the North China Mission in the Province of Honan
- Stewart Houston (???? – 1911), Anglican priest who was a missionary in Mount Forest from 1859 – 1866
- William James Wanless (1865 – 1933), Presbyterian missionary who founded a medical mission in Miraj, India from 1894 – 1933

=== Politicians ===
- George S. Armstrong (1867 – 1947), 11th Mayor of Edmonton from 1910 – 1912
- James Balfour (1867 – 1947), 18th Mayor of Regina in 1915 and 1931
- Henry Robson Bowman (1896 – 1954), member of the Legislative Assembly of British Columbia from 1949 – 1952
- Murray Calder (1951 – ), member of the House of Commons of Canada from 1993 – 2004
- James J. Craig (1855 – 1929), member of the Legislative Assembly of Ontario from 1905 – 1911
- Charles Evans (1882 – 1947), member of the House of Commons of Canada from 1935 – 1945
- William Samuel Hall (1871 – 1938), member of the House of Commons of Canada from 1935 – 1938
- Michael Harris (1979 – ), Waterloo Regional Councillor for Kitchener since 2018
- Jack Johnson (1930 – 2009), member of the Legislative Assembly of Ontario from 1975 – 1990
- George Albert McGuire (1871 – 1955), member of the Legislative Assembly of British Columbia from 1907 – 1916
- Norman Platt Lambert (1885 – 1965), served in the Senate of Canada from 1938 – 1965
- Alexander Munro Martin (1852 – 1915), member of the House of Commons of Canada from 1907 – 1911
- Robert Martin (1858 – 1942), 8th Mayor of Regina in 1894 and 1913 – 1914
- Thomas Martin (1850 – 1907), member of the House of Commons of Canada from 1904 – 1907
- James McMullen (1833 – 1913), served in the Senate of Canada from 1902 – 1913
- John Morrison (1868 – 1930), member of the Legislative Assembly of Manitoba from 1916 – 1922
- John Albert Sheppard (1875 – 1947), member of the Legislative Assembly of Saskatchewan from 1905 – 1916
- John Stovel (1858 – 1923), member of the Legislative Assembly of Manitoba from 1920 – 1922
- William Thomas Straith (1894 – 1980), member of the Legislative Assembly of British Columbia from 1937 – 1953
- David McKenzie Wright (1874 – 1937), member of the House of Commons of Canada from 1925 – 1926 and 1930 – 1935

=== Writers ===
- André Forget (???? - ), known for his novel In the City of Pigs (2022)
- Harold R. Johnson (1954 – 2022), known for his book Firewater: How Alcohol is Killing My People (and Yours) (2016)
- Frank Prewett (1893 – 1962), war poet whose work is recognized in the final Georgian Poetry anthology and in Oxford Poetry
