= André Forget =

Canadian writer

André Forget is a Canadian writer, whose debut novel In the City of Pigs was longlisted for the 2022 Giller Prize and shortlisted for the 2023 Amazon.ca First Novel Award.

Forget was born in Toronto, Ontario, and grew up in Mount Forest. He is a former editor of the literary magazine The Puritan.

In the City of Pigs grew out of a short story Forget wrote for a collaborative arts group led by his friend Joel Peters, on the prompt of an underwater organ. The full novel centres on Alexander Otkazov, a failed classical musician who moves to Toronto and becomes drawn into a shady real estate cabal.
