= College Heights Secondary School (Guelph) =

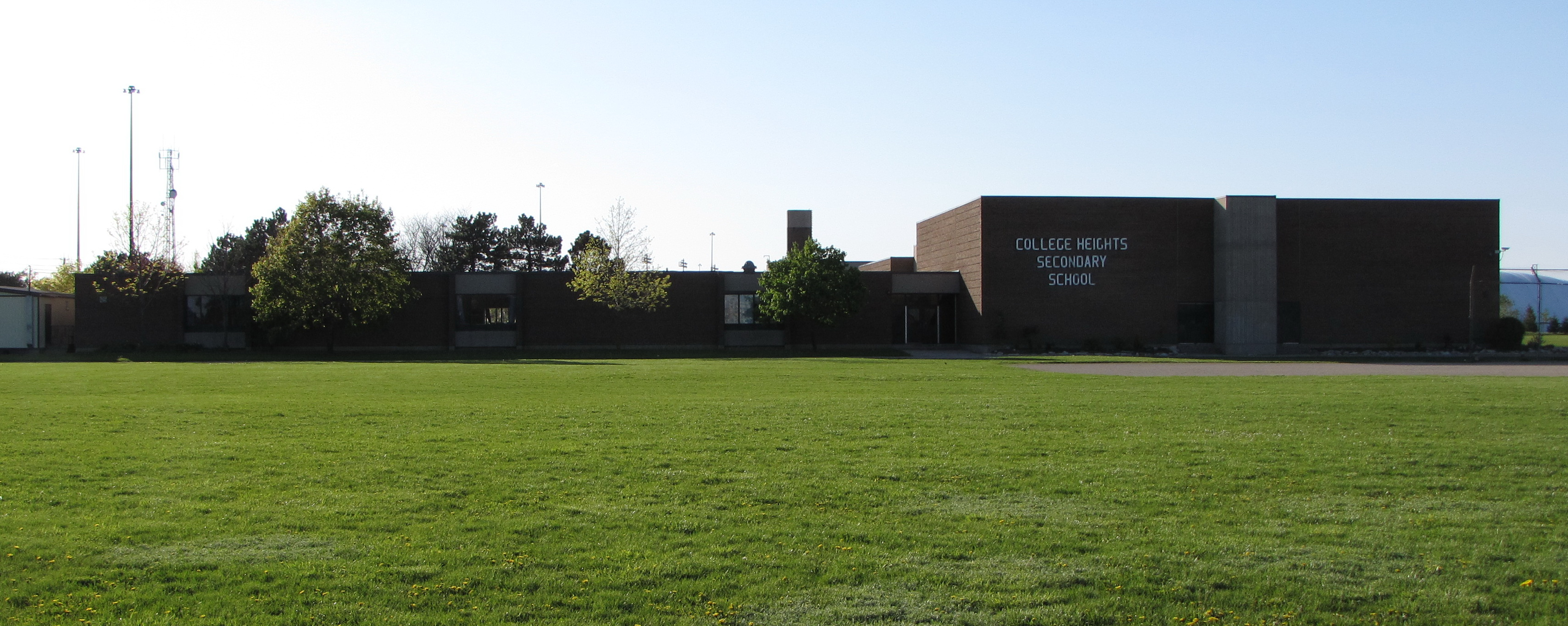

Location
- 371 College Avenue West; Guelph, Ontario, N1G 1T3; Canada; 43.5225°N 80.2508°W

Information
- Founded: 1968
- Principal: Keith Coutu
- Grades: 11-12
- Language: English
- Colours: Blue & Red
- Mascot: Huskies
- Team name: Huskies
- Website: www.ugdsb.ca/o/chss

College Heights Secondary School is a public high school located in Guelph, Ontario, Canada. It is part of the Upper Grand District School Board.

== History ==
College Heights Secondary School, founded in 1968, is a community-based school that works with industry, business and community organizations to support students. The program prepares students for apprenticeships, college or the workplace. The program includes a wide variety of technical pathways as well as eight Specialist High Skills Major Programs. In recent years the school has dramatically increased their student credit success rate, graduation rate and Literacy Test Success Rate. The school population ranges between 580 and 650 students.

== See also ==
- Education in Ontario
- List of secondary schools in Ontario
