= Norman Platt Lambert =

Canadian politician

The Honourable Norman Platt Lambert
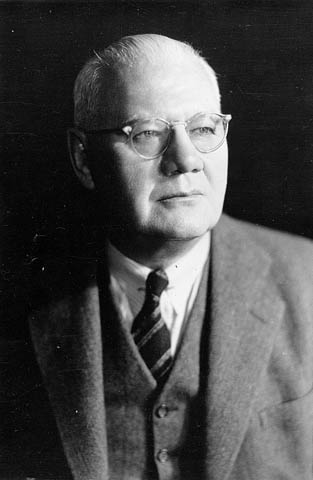

Canadian Senator from Ontario
- In office January 20, 1938 – November 4, 1965
- Appointed by: William Lyon Mackenzie King

Personal details
- Born: January 7, 1885 Mount Forest, Ontario, Canada
- Died: November 4, 1965 (aged 80) Ottawa, Ontario, Canada
- Party: Liberal

Norman Platt Lambert (January 7, 1885 – November 4, 1965) was a Canadian journalist and Senator.

== Background ==
Born in Mount Forest, Ontario, he received a Bachelor of Arts degree from the University of Toronto in 1909. After graduating, he started as a staff writer at The Globe where he would remain until 1918. In 1918, he accepted the position of Secretary for the Canadian Council of Agriculture and Associate Editor of the Grain Growers' Guide in Winnipeg. In 1922, he became Western manager and acting general manager of the Manitoba Maple Leaf Milling Company. In 1930, he also worked again with The Globe.

In 1932, he was appointed General Secretary and Chief Organizer of the National Liberal Federation and was the party's president from 1936 to 1941. In 1938, he was summoned to the Canadian Senate on the advice of Mackenzie King representing the senatorial division of Ottawa, Ontario. A Liberal, he served until his death in 1965.

Following his term as NLF president, Lambert took on a position managing the federation's financial interests and also served as a director of the Liberal Realty Company and in these positions played a role in obtaining a building to house the party's headquarters.

Party political offices
Preceded by Vincent Massey	President of the Liberal Party of Canada; 1936–1941	Succeeded by Norman Alexander McLarty
