= Frank Prewett =

Frank James Prewett (August 24, 1893 – February 16, 1962) was a Canadian poet who spent most of his life in the United Kingdom. He was a war poet of the First World War and was taken up by Siegfried Sassoon, but after a period of being lionised socially he led a mainly unsatisfactory life, suffering from bad health.

He was born near Mount Forest, Ontario, and brought up on a farm near Kenilworth, Ontario. In 1915 he left his studies at the University of Toronto and enlisted as a private in the Canadian Army. Later he was offered and accepted a commission in the British Army, serving in the Royal Field Artillery. He served in France, but was invalided out in 1917 after being injured twice, once having to claw his way out of the earth after being buried alive. While he was recovering from shell shock in a psychiatric hospital in 1918 he began pretending to be an Iroquois called Toronto. This was accepted at the time, but was later questioned, and ultimately disproved by DNA analysis, which found no genetic connection to Iroquois. The claim has been attributed to post-traumatic stress disorder.

At Lennel Auxiliary Hospital, a sister hospital to Craiglockhart War Hospital, he met Sassoon, who later wrote a brief portrait of him in his autobiography, Siegfried's Journey. Sassoon introduced him to Lady Ottoline Morrell and he stayed at Garsington, her estate, while he awaited repatriation to Canada. Prewett later maintained a regular correspondence with Lady Ottoline (Darroch 215) and when he returned to England he was offered a job at Garsington, but "he fell under suspicion of keeping back farm earnings" (Darroch, 233) and was asked to leave.

Prewett had an academic job at an agricultural research institute from the mid-1920s to 1934. He married Madeline Vera Clinkard in 1925, but the marriage failed. On Sassoon's evidence, he suffered from clinical depression.

His poems were recognised by the inclusion of some of them in the final Georgian Poetry anthology and in Oxford Poetry, and by publication by the Hogarth Press; followed by a collection The Rural Scene in 1922. In the 1930s he was a BBC broadcaster and did editorial work. A historical novel set in Berkshire in the times of Captain Swing, The Chazzey Tragedy (1933), made little impact. He was married again, to Dorothy Agnes Pollard, who was a colleague on the editorial staff of The Countryman, the magazine where he was working.

During the Second World War he served in the RAF, and he stayed on in the Air Ministry until 1954. Retiring because of poor health, he farmed near Abingdon until his death in Inverness.

Robert Graves, a friend from Oxford days, edited his Collected Poems, published in 1964. Graves's introduction provides the longest printed account of Prewett's life available. A volume of Selected Poems was published in 1987.
