= Bishop Macdonell Catholic High School =

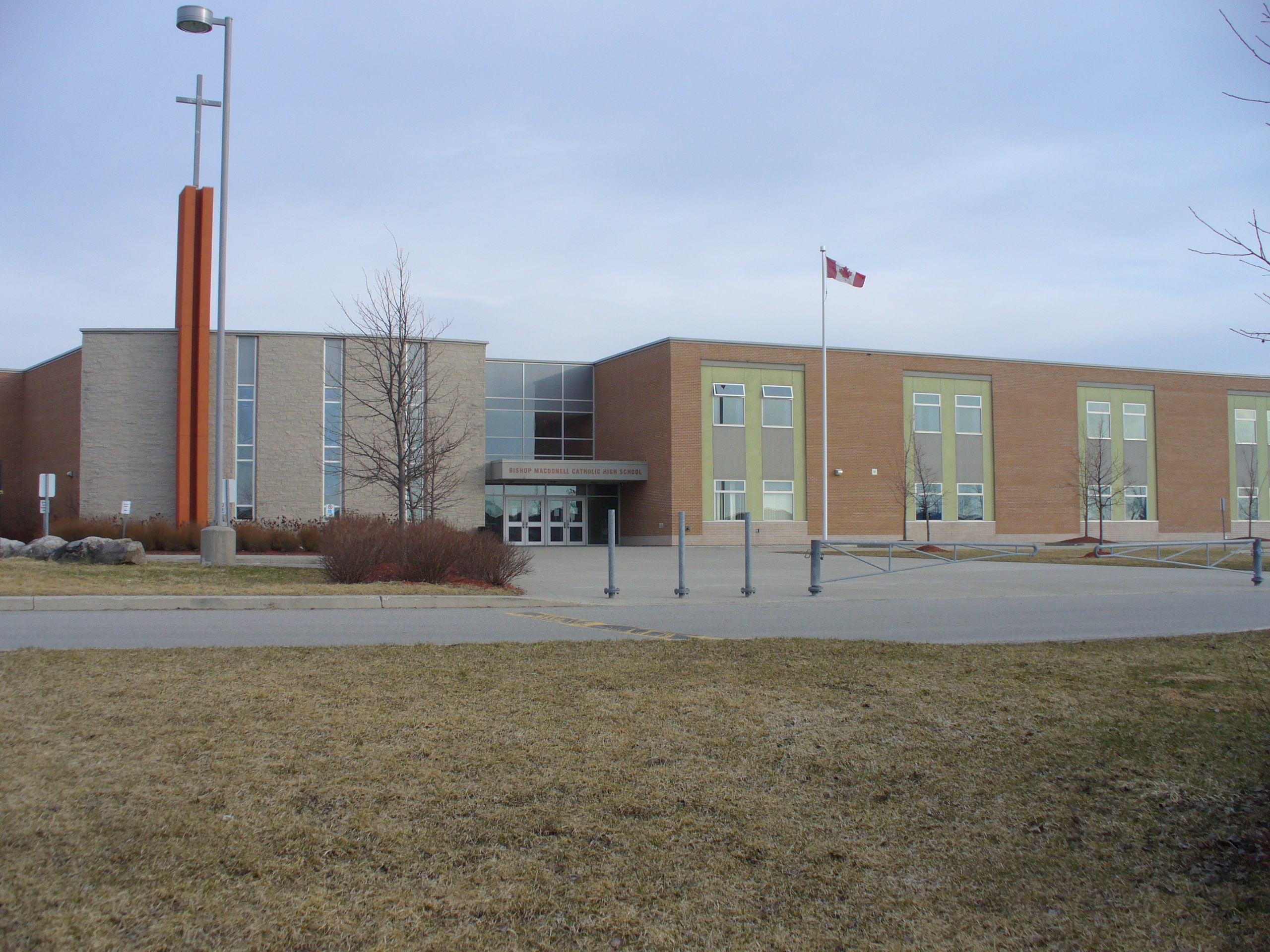

Location
- 200 Clair Road; Guelph, Ontario, N1L 1G1; Canada
- Coordinates: 43°29′38″N 80°11′45″W

Information
- School type: Public Separate high school
- Motto: Wisdom, Honour, Courage
- Religious affiliation: Catholic
- Founded: 1962
- School board: Wellington Catholic District School Board
- School number: 689661
- Principal: Michael MacPherson
- Grades: 9-12
- Enrollment: 750 (2016)
- Language: English
- Colours: Navy and Sky blue
- Team name: Celtics
- Website: www.bishopmac.ca

Bishop Macdonell Catholic High School is a Catholic high school located in the southern end of Guelph, Ontario, Canada. It is one of the four high schools in the Wellington Catholic District School Board, all of which are located within the city limits of Guelph.

== History ==
Originally, this school was located in downtown Guelph at the intersection of Cork and Norfolk Street, next to the Basilica of Our Lady Immaculate.

The school's roots date from when the Loretto Sisters, also known as the Institute of the Blessed Virgin Mary, arrived from Toronto and opened a school for girls in 1856 (housed in the convent, the last remaining structure that is standing as part of the original school). The enrolment quickly increased and in 1872, an addition was constructed. In 1883, it was decided that the younger grades would be moved to two other sites on the original property (St. Agnes school for girls - which is still standing and St. Stanislaus School for boys - which was rebuilt in 1977) and the convent school would continue to house the high school students. By 1926, enrolment was continuing to increase and the new Loretto Academy was built immediately next door the convent school. The all-girls school continued to be operated by the Loretto sisters.

In 1953, the co-educational Notre Dame High School was erected, and at this time, laywomen and men joined the Sisters as part of the teaching staff. This building provided facilities for grades 9 and 10 and was infamous for its gymnasium and its "caged gallery". On the other hand, Loretto Academy also became co-educational and housed students in grades 11, 12, and 13. In 1962, Loretto Academy and Notre Dame were renamed Bishop Macdonell Catholic High School, after Bishop Alexander Macdonell (1762–1840), a well-respected Catholic leader in his own time, and a few years later in 1966-1967, the two schools were officially joined by an addition.

In 1992, a report highlighting the needs of the Catholic community through a Board-School-Church committee, recommended the closure of the original high school and a recommendation of a school of the same name to be built in the future. Despite a long and hard-fought battle with support from many members of the community, the school was closed in June, 1995 and the three buildings, with the exception of the original 1856 convent building, were demolished in 2004.

In September 2004, the recommendation of the committee finally came forth as the existing school on Clair Road West opened, starting with grades 9 through 11. Grade 12 has since been added, thereby enabling full granting status of the Ontario Secondary School Diploma, continuing the tradition of the Loretto Sisters and Celtic Pride in Guelph.

On June 16, 2009, Grade 9 student Isabel Warren was tragically killed by a cinderblock wall collapsing on her in a washroom facility in Larry Pearson Park, which is located behind the school.

== Notable alumni ==
- Todd Bertuzzi (NHL)
- John Cullen (NHL)
- Blake Marshall (CFL)
- Jamie Taras (CFL)
- Greg Marshall (CIAU Football Player and Coach)
- Jeff O'Neill (NHL)
- Thomas Christopher Collins (Canadian Cardinal of the Catholic Church)
- Evan Siddall (CEO Alberta Investment Management Corporation)
- Rick Ferraro (Member of Provincial Parliament Wellington South 1985-1987, Guelph 1987-1990)
- Rachelle Campbell (1976 Olympic track team)
- Erin Mielzynski (Olympic Alphine Skiing - Vancouver 2010, Sochi 2012, PyeongChang 2016, Beijing 2022)

== International Baccalaureate Program ==
As of 2015, Bishop Macdonell was officially named an International Baccalaureate World School, the first of its kind in the City of Guelph.

== The school today ==
The school now has an approximate population of 750 students ranging from grades 9-12. It is a uniformed school. The uniforms are black dress pants, a golf shirt, a rugby sweater, and French cut white blouse for girls, and a golf shirt and black slacks for boys. The school's mottos are "Wisdom - Honour - Courage" and "Our Blood Runs Celtic Blue."

== See also ==
- Education in Ontario
- List of secondary schools in Ontario
- Alexander Macdonell (bishop of Kingston)
- Our Lady of Lourdes Catholic High School
- Saint James Catholic High School
