= Westside Secondary School =

Location
- 300 Alder Street; Orangeville, Ontario, L9W 5A2; Canada; 43.90576°N 80.12379°W

Information
- Founded: 1999
- School board: Upper Grand District School Board
- Principal: Janine Grin
- Grades: 9-12
- Enrollment: 800 (2019/2020)
- Language: English
- Colours: Red and Black
- Team name: Westside Thunder
- Website: www.ugdsb.ca/o/wss/

Westside Secondary School is a public high school located in Orangeville, Ontario, Canada that opened on November 25, 1999. The current population is 800 students.

== See also ==
- Education in Ontario
- List of secondary schools in Ontario
