= Upper Grand District School Board =

School board in Ontario, Canada

Address
- 500 Victoria Road North Guelph, Ontario, N1E 6K2; Canada
- Coordinates: 43.57905°N 80.26285°W

District information
- Superintendent: Chief Executive Officer and Chief Education Officer (Brent McDonald); Chief Financial Officer (Scott Keys); Human Rights, Equity and Accessibility Commissioner (Alicia Ralph) Superintendents of Education (Claudine Tyrell, Steve Viveiros, Belal Taha, Wendy Donaldson, Roy Cousins); Superintendent of People, Leadership & Culture (Deirdre Pyke)
- Chair of the board: Ralf Mesenbrink
- Director of education: Brent McDonald
- Schools: 66 elementary schools 12 secondary schools
- Budget: CA$528 million (2026-27)
- District ID: B66117

Other information
- Elected trustees: Ralf Mesenbrink, Jen Edwards, Irene Hanenberg, Katherine Hauser, Martha MacNeil, Alethia O’Hara-Stephenson, Kyle Reaburn, Lynn Topping, Luke Weiler, Laurie Whyte, Robin Ross
- Student trustees: Keira and Tavleen
- Website: http://www.ugdsb.ca

The Upper Grand District School Board (known as English-language Public District School Board No. 18 prior to 1999) is a school board in Ontario, Canada. It spans an area of 4211 km^{2} and serves approximately 35,000 students through 66 elementary schools and 12 secondary schools in Dufferin County, Wellington County and the City of Guelph.

Student success is the goal of over 4,000 dedicated teaching and support staff who are aided by the contributions of caring volunteers and community partners.

The board has 10 elected trustees and 2 student trustees. The 2026-27 budget (Operating only) is $528,819,918.

== Multi-Year Plan ==
In June 2022, the Board of Trustees approved the UGDSB's Multi-Year Plan 2022-2026+. A school board’s MYP establishes the key directions that guide the organization’s actions for the students and communities that it serves. The 2022-2026+ Multi-Year Plan established the following priorities:

== Kindergarten and Full Day Early Learning Kindergarten ==
Kindergarten is a two-year program that includes Junior (year 1) and Senior (year 2) Kindergarten.

In September 2010, the Board began offering the full day kindergarten program in some schools as part of a province wide implementation plan. As of the 2014–2015 school year, all elementary schools offer Full Day Kindergarten (FDK). At these schools, JK and SK children attend all day every day, Monday to Friday.

== French as a Second Language (FSL) ==
The board offers two FSL programs – Core French and French Immersion.

Core French is mandatory from Grades 4 to 8 for all students in English-language elementary schools. At the secondary level, students can take French as a subject from grade 9 to grade 12. It is mandatory that students take one French credit for the Ontario Secondary School Diploma.

French Immersion offers students the opportunity to acquire a high level of proficiency in French while maintaining and developing English language skills. French Immersion is available in 19 elementary schools and four high schools.

== Secondary schools ==
Secondary schools are listed below:

- Centennial Collegiate Vocational Institute (Guelph)
- Centre Dufferin District High School (Dufferin County)
- Centre Wellington District High School (Wellington County)
- College Heights Secondary School (Guelph)
- Erin District High School (Wellington County)
- Guelph Collegiate Vocational Institute (Guelph)
- John F. Ross Collegiate Vocational Institute (Guelph)
- Norwell District Secondary School (Wellington County)
- Orangeville District Secondary School (Dufferin County)
- Two Rivers Secondary school (Guelph)
- Wellington Heights Secondary School (Wellington County)
- Westside Secondary School (Dufferin County)
- ECPP (Education and Community Partnership Programs), Youth Options and SAL (Supervised Alternative Learning)

=== Educational options ===
As part of Career/Life planning programming, Upper Grand DSB offers four immersive experiential programs for students in grades 7-12+.

Career Pathways Exploration Programs:

- Co-operative Education
- Dual Credit
- Ontario Youth Apprenticeship Program (OYAP)
- Specialist High Skills Major (SHSM)

== Elementary schools ==
Wellington County	Guelph	Dufferin County
Aberfoyle Public School; Alma Public School; Arthur Public School; Brisbane Public School; Centre Peel Public School; Drayton Heights Public School; Elora Public School; Eramosa Public School; Erin Public School; Grand River Public School; Harris Mill Public School; J.D. Hogarth Public School, Fergus; James McQueen Public School, Fergus; John Black Public School, Fergus; Kenilworth Public School; Maryborough Public School, Moorefield; Minto-Clifford Public School, Harriston; Palmerston Public School; Ponsonby Public School; Rockwood Centennial Public School; Ross R. MacKay Public School, Hillsburgh; Salem Public School; Victoria Cross Public School, Mount Forest; Victoria Terrace Public School, Fergus	Arbour Vista Public School; Brant Avenue Public School; Central Public School; Edward Johnson Public School; Fred A. Hamilton Public School; Gateway Drive Public School; Guelph Lake Public School; Jean Little Public School; John Galt Public School; John McCrae Public School; June Avenue Public School; Ken Danby Public School; King George Public School; Kortright Hills Public School; Mitchell Woods Public School; Ottawa Crescent Public School; Paisley Road Public School; Priory Park Public School; Rickson Ridge Public School; Sir Isaac Brock Public School; Taylor Evans Public School; Victory Public School; Waverley Drive Public School; Westminster Woods Public School; Westwood Public School; William C. Winegard Public School; Willow Road Public School	Centennial Hylands Elementary School, Shelburne; Credit Meadows Elementary School, Orangeville; East Garafraxa Public School; Glenbrook Elementary School, Shelburne; Grand Valley and District Public School; Hyland Heights Elementary School, Shelburne; Island Lake Public School, Orangeville; Laurelwoods Elementary School, Orangeville; Mono-Amaranth Public School; Montgomery Village Public School, Orangeville; Parkinson Centennial Public School, Orangeville; Primrose Public School; Princess Elizabeth Public School, Orangeville; Princess Margaret Public School, Orangeville; Spencer Avenue Elementary School, Orangeville

== See also ==
- Wellington Catholic District School Board
- Dufferin-Peel Catholic District School Board
- List of school districts in Ontario
- List of high schools in Ontario
