= Evan Siddall =

Canadian businessman (born 1965)

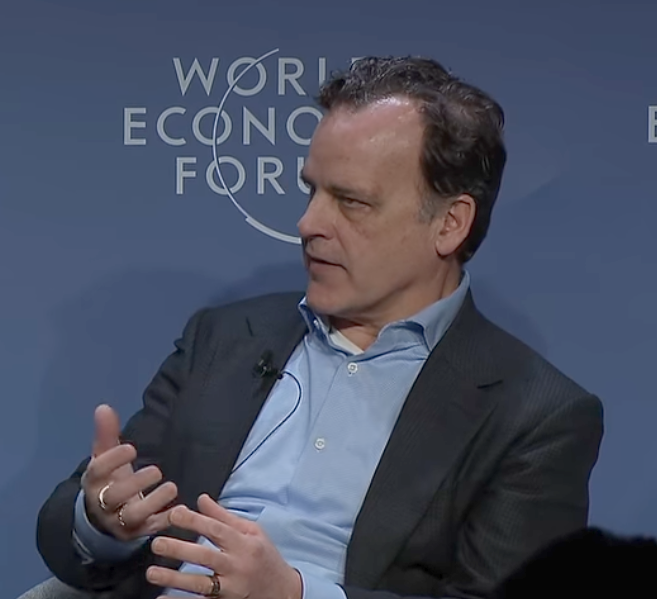
- At the 2024 World Economic Forum

CEO of Alberta Investment Management Corporation
- In office July 1, 2021 – November 3, 2024
- Preceded by: Kevin Uebelein

President & CEO of the Canada Mortgage & Housing Corporation
- In office 2014–2021
- Preceded by: Karen Kinsley
- Succeeded by: Romy Bowers

Special Advisor to the Governor of the Bank of Canada
- In office 2010–2014
- Preceded by: Tim Hodgson
- Succeeded by: Lynn Paterson

Personal details
- Born: 1965 (age 60–61) Toronto, Ontario, Canada
- Spouse: Sonia Verma
- Children: 2
- Education: Osgoode Hall Law School, University of Guelph

Evan Siddall (born 1965) is a Canadian businessman who was Chief Executive Officer of the Alberta Investment Management Corporation from 2021 to 2024. Previously, he was the CEO of Canada’s state-owned housing authority, the Canada Mortgage and Housing Corporation, following a career in investment banking.

== Early life and education ==
Siddall was born in Toronto, Ontario, grew up in Georgetown, Ontario and attended Bishop Macdonell Catholic High School in Guelph, Ontario.

Siddall obtained a B.A. in Management Economics from the University of Guelph, and an LL.B. from Osgoode Hall Law School, York University. He also completed the President's Program in Leadership executive education program at Harvard Business School.

== Career ==
Siddall was appointed CEO of AIMCo effective July 1, 2021 and has been credited with transforming its leadership and strategy around a renewed focus on clients following significant trading losses in 2020.

Previously, Siddall was President & Chief Executive Officer of the Canada Mortgage and Housing Corporation (CMHC) from January, 2014 to April, 2021. He was appointed CEO of CMHC for a five-year term effective January 1, 2014. Siddall's role entailed leading CMHC as it implemented Canada’s 10-year National Housing Strategy. In 2018, Siddall's term was renewed for another two years, to December 2020. On Tuesday, January 14, 2020, Siddall announced that he would not be renewing his term at CMHC, though on December 18, 2020, he agreed to stay on as President and CEO of CMHC until a new CEO is appointed. Siddall has been a vocal defender of the Trudeau government's mortgage stress test to limit house price growth by making it harder to qualify for a mortgage in Canada.

Siddall entered public service in 2010, joining the Bank of Canada as Special Advisor to the Governor and the Bank’s Senior Representative in Toronto, Canada’s financial centre.

Siddall spent five years at Burns Fry Limited (later BMO Nesbitt Burns) (1989-1994) before leaving as Managing Director to become a Vice President of Goldman Sachs & Co in 1997. Promoted to Managing Director in 2001, he left Goldman in 2002 to join Lazard Frères & Co as Resident Managing Director and Head of Canada. Siddall joined Fort Reliance Limited, the parent company of Irving Oil Limited, as Corporate Finance Officer in 2009.

Siddall is a former chair of the Board of Governors of the University of Guelph, 2008-2011, and the Council of Chairs of Ontario Universities. He was also a former faculty member and founding member of the Advisory Board of the Max Bell School of Public Policy at McGill University. He is a past president of the Power Plant Contemporary Art Gallery and the Osler Bluff Ski Club. Siddall is also a co-founder of craft brewery Side Launch Brewing Co. In 2022, Siddall was honoured with a Catalyst award for his work in promoting women and diversity, equity, and inclusion.

Siddall is formerly a Nonresident Senior Fellow of the Brookings Institution and attended the annual meeting of the Bilderberg Group in Madrid in 2024.

== Personal life ==
He is married to Sonia Verma, a Canadian news executive and former foreign correspondent.

Siddall, who was diagnosed with early-onset Parkinson's disease in 2014, founded an annual cycling fundraiser for Parkinson's, the Growling Beaver Brevet, which has raised over CAD$4 million for Parkinsons charities. He served on the board of the Davis Phinney Foundation from 2016-2020.
