= Centre Wellington District High School =

Location
- 906 Scotland Street; Fergus, Ontario, N1M 2W5; Canada; 43.70175°N 80.3566°W

Information
- School type: High school
- Motto: Dulcius ex asperis
- Founded: 1928
- School board: Upper Grand District School Board
- School number: 909831
- Principal: Kevin Taylor
- Grades: 9-12
- Enrollment: 1220
- Language: English
- Colours: Black, red, gold
- Mascot: Freddy the Falcon
- Team name: Falcons
- Website: www.ugdsb.ca/o/cwdhs
- Last updated: 8 December 2008

Centre Wellington District High School, or CWDHS, is a high school located in Fergus, Ontario. The school was originally called Fergus High School and was constructed in 1928. Later, two additions were built, but eventually, the number of students exceeded the capacity of the building. As a result, a brand new school was built which opened in September 2004. It is run by the Upper Grand District School Board. The principal of the school is Kevin Taylor; the school's vice principals Christine Kirkland and Andrew Ethier.

The school's educational philosophy is centered on three core principles: learning, respect, and community.

== Curriculum ==
=== Departments ===
The CWDHS school includes the following departments:

- The Arts (Drama, Music, Media Arts and Fine Arts)
- Business Studies
- Computer Technology
- English
- Social Sciences (Geography, History and Family Studies)
- International Languages (French and Spanish)
- Mathematics
- Science
- Physical Education
- Technological Studies

== Athletic program ==
Similar to most high schools, CWDHS has a vast extracurricular athletic program in which teams travel to surrounding schools to compete. The school is particularly strong in distance running, hockey, rugby and wrestling, having heralded several provincial and national champions in these sports.

Sports include the following:

- Badminton
- Basketball
- Cross Country
- Curling
- Field Hockey
- Ice Hockey
- Rugby
- Softball
- Soccer
- Swimming
- Tennis
- Track & Field
- Ultimate Frisbee
- Volleyball
- Wrestling

CWDHS plays in the competitive District 10 of CWOSSA (Central Western Ontario Secondary Sports Association). District 10 is made of up of high schools in Wellington County, the city of Guelph, Dufferin County and their outlying areas.

== Extracurricular activities and clubs ==
- Athletic Council
- Barbell Club
- Battle of the Brushes Club
- Band & Choir
- CW Christian Fellowship
- Cybertitan
- D&D (Dungeons and Dragons) Club
- Dance Crew
- DECA
- Environment Club
- Falcon Reads Book Club
- Falcons United
- Fashion and Interior Design Club
- Games Club
- Indigenous Students Group
- Multi-faith Club
- Pottery Club
- PRISM
- Random Fandom Club
- SOCA – Students of Colour Alliance
- Tech Crew
- Theatre Centre Wellington (several school plays/musical held annually)
- Ultimate Frisbee

== Notable graduates ==
- Patrick Anderson, wheelchair basketball player, 6x Paralympian, flagbearer at 2024 Games
- Cody Beals, Ironman and Half-Ironman athlete, many 1st/2nd place results
- Michael Chong, Wellington-Halton Hills MP, former federal cabinet minister
- Brock McGinn, NHL hockey player
- Brendan Myers, philosopher & author
- Cameron Seth, professional squash player

== See also ==
- Education in Ontario
- List of secondary schools in Ontario
