= Robert Martin (Canadian politician) =

Canadian Saskatchewan territory politician

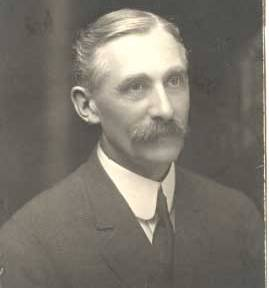
Robert Martin Source: City of Regina Archives

Robert Martin (January 14, 1858 – August 1, 1942) was a pharmacist and political figure in Saskatchewan, Canada. He was mayor of Regina in 1894 and from 1913 to 1914.

He was born in Mount Forest, Canada West, the son of John Martin and Jean Monroe, both immigrants from Scotland. After completing his education, Martin worked as a clerk in a local pharmacy and completed his education in pharmacy in 1876. He came to Regina in 1882, settling there the following year and worked in a drug store there until 1888, when he went into business on his own. Martin married Helen McNeish in 1883. He helped establish the North West Territories Pharmaceutical Association and served as its first examiner. He also helped form the Canadian Pharmaceutical Association and later was president of the association. Martin served in the senate for the University of Saskatchewan. He died on August 1, 1942, at the age of 84 at a hospital in Regina.
