= George Epoch =

George G. Epoch
- Born: April 18, 1920; Kenilworth, Ontario, Canada
- Died: 30 September 1986 (aged 66); Pickering, Ontario, Canada
- Occupation: Former priest
- Known for: Sexual abuse

Ecclesiastical career
- Church: Roman Catholic Church
- Ordained: 1952
- Congregations served: Holy Cross Church, Wiikwemkoong; St Mary's Church, Cape Croker

George G. Epoch (April 18, 1920 - September 30, 1986) was a Canadian priest, a member of the Jesuit Fathers of Upper Canada. From 1971 to 1983, Epoch abused over 120 children at the Jesuit mission of Wikwemikong and St Mary's church of Cape Croker and Saugeen, all of which are first nations reserves in Ontario, Canada.

== Life ==
In 1938, he began his Jesuit studies in Guelph. Epoch was ordained as a Jesuit priest on June 22, 1952. He died in residence at the Holy Cross Mission at Wikwemikong in 1986.

== Sexual abuse allegations ==
Reports of sexual abuse by father Epoch are recorded as early as 1985. In 1990, claims of sexual abuse by father George Epoch began to be publicized. The abuse claims concerned his work in three Jesuit missions on first-nations reserves in Ontario, Canada: Wikwemikong, St Mary's Church of Cape Croker and Saugeen.

In 2018, a class action lawsuit filed against the Roman Catholic Archdiocese of Halifax–Yarmouth claimed that in 1962, Epoch assaulted a young boy in the garment room of the church, and later in Epoch's room at the priest's communal residence.

== Reparations ==
On August 30, 1992, The Jesuit Fathers of Upper Canada publicly apologized for Epoch's abuse of the children. The next year, after negotiations, they paid financial settlements to over 100 of the abused children.
