= Centennial Collegiate Vocational Institute =

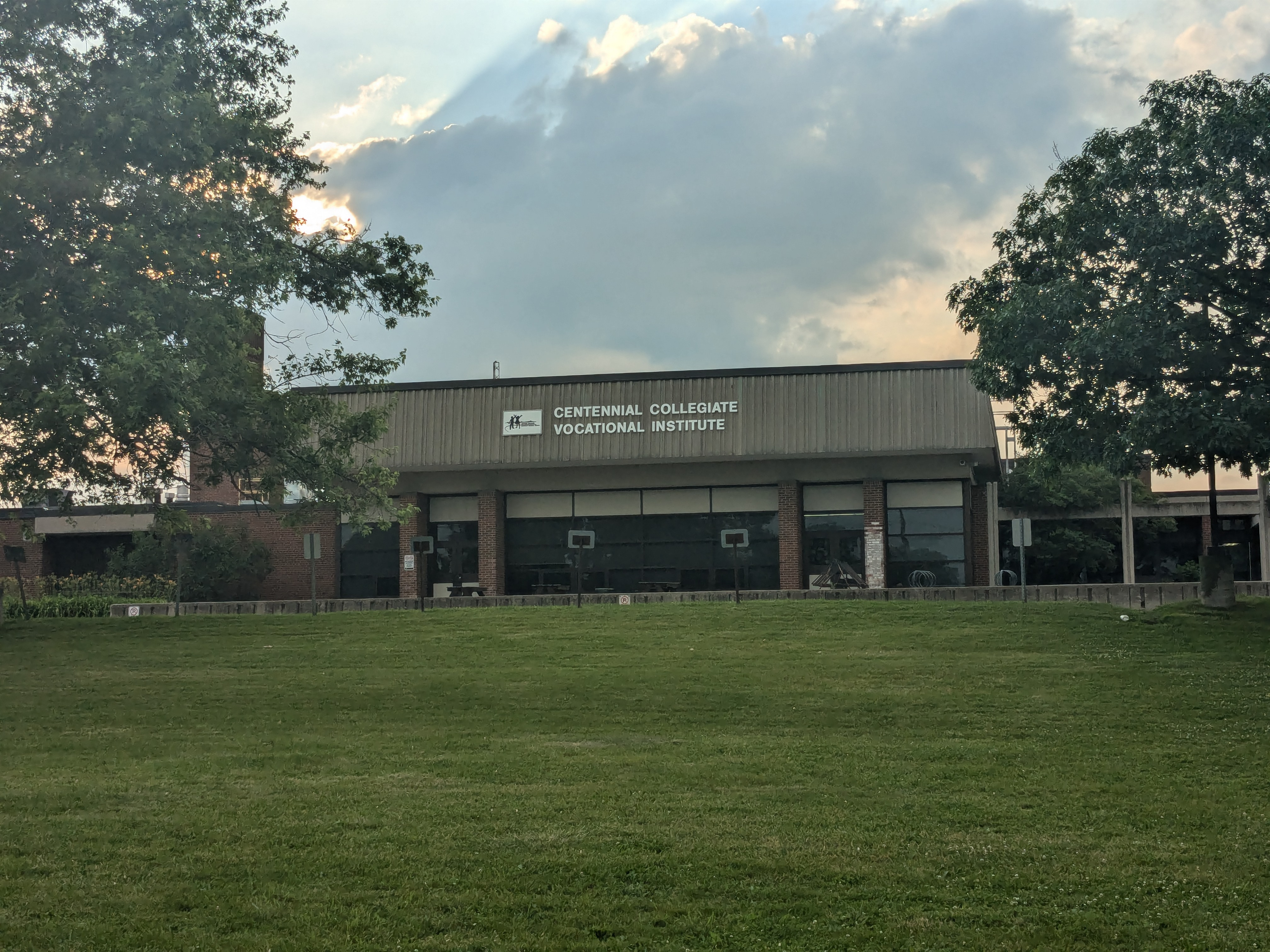
- Front entrance in 2024

Location
- 289 College Avenue West; Guelph, Ontario, N1G 1S9; Canada; 43.52215°N 80.20905°W

Information
- School type: Secondary school
- Motto: Palma per ardua (Latin: "Success through hard work")
- Founded: 1967
- School board: Upper Grand District School Board
- Principal: Joe Burns
- Grades: 9 to 12
- Enrollment: 1700+ (September 2023)
- Language: English
- Area: Guelph
- Colours: Purple & gold
- Mascot: Martin the Spartan
- Team name: Centennial Spartans
- Rival: John F. Ross CVI
- Website: www.ugdsb.ca/ccvi/

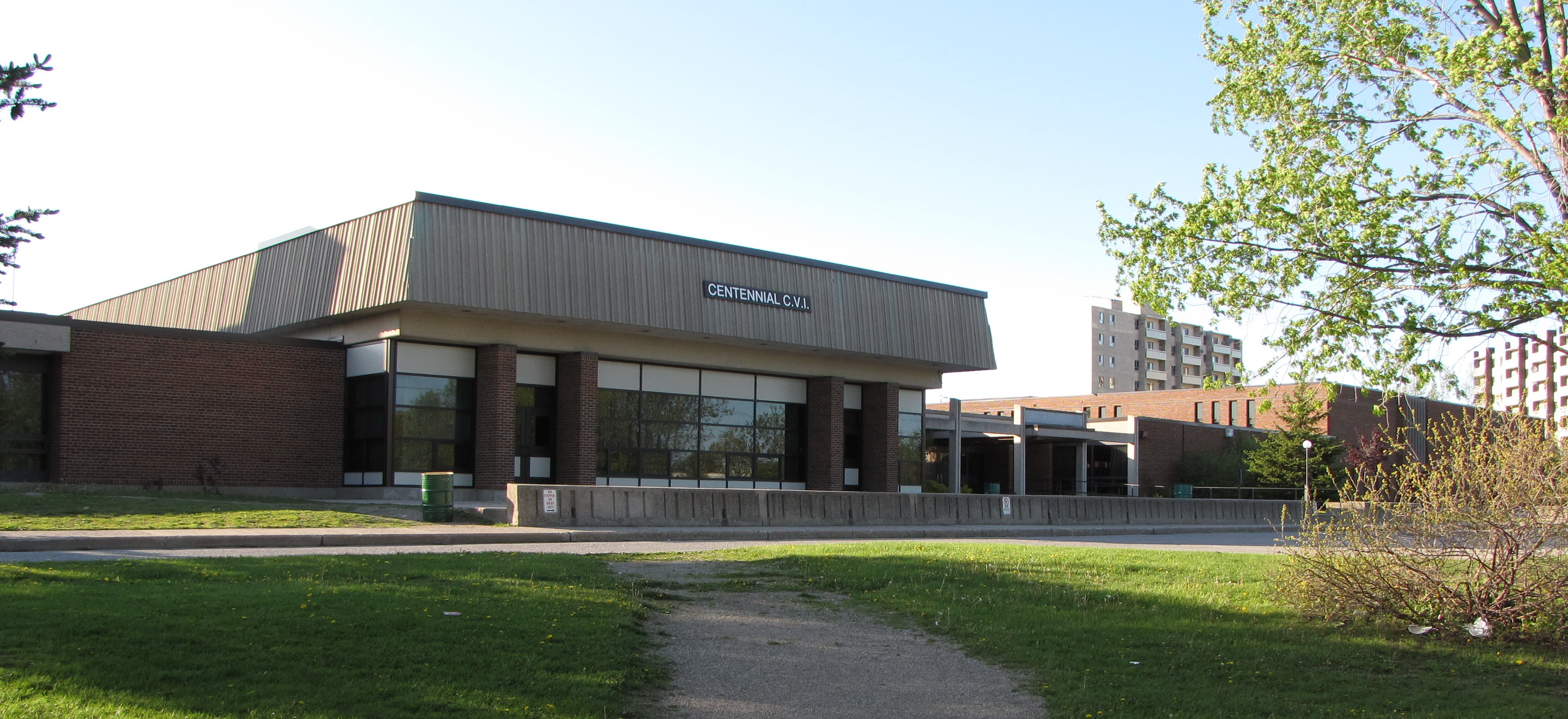

Centennial Collegiate Vocational Institute is a secondary high school located in ward five of Guelph, Ontario, Canada. Centennial offers many programs including science, math, business, English, French, and biotechnology. The school colours are purple and gold. Centennial has offered AP exams (advanced placement) for over 20 years.

== History ==
The school is located on the northeast side of Guelph. It was opened in 1967, 100 years after Canadian Confederation, as indicated by its name, and is operated by the Upper Grand District School Board.

The school was ranked 3rd of 719 in the Fraser Institute Report Card on Ontario Secondary School's 2007 Edition. As of 2023, Centennial is ranked 35th out of 739 high schools in Ontario in the Fraser report.

== Notable alumni ==
- Natalie Achonwa (1992–), professional basketball player in the WNBA 2015–2023
- Wesley Cain (1994–), professional soccer player on Waterloo United of the L1ON
- Victor Davis (1964–1989), gold medal winner in the 200 metre breaststroke at the 1984 Summer Olympics
- Scott Diamond (1986–), professional baseball player in the MLB 2011–2016
- Thomas Dimitroff (1966–), general manager of the Atlanta Falcons of the NFL 2008–2020
- David Gibbins (1962–), underwater archaeologist, bestselling novelist who wrote the novel Atlantis
- Brittany Kassil (1991–), rugby union player who has competed for Canada at the Women's Rugby World Cup
- George McPhee (1958–), professional ice hockey player in the NHL 1982–1989, general manager of the Vegas Golden Knights
- Tommy Nield (1999–), professional Canadian football player on the Saskatchewan Roughriders of the CFL

== See also ==
- Education in Ontario
- List of secondary schools in Ontario
