= Wellington Heights Secondary School =

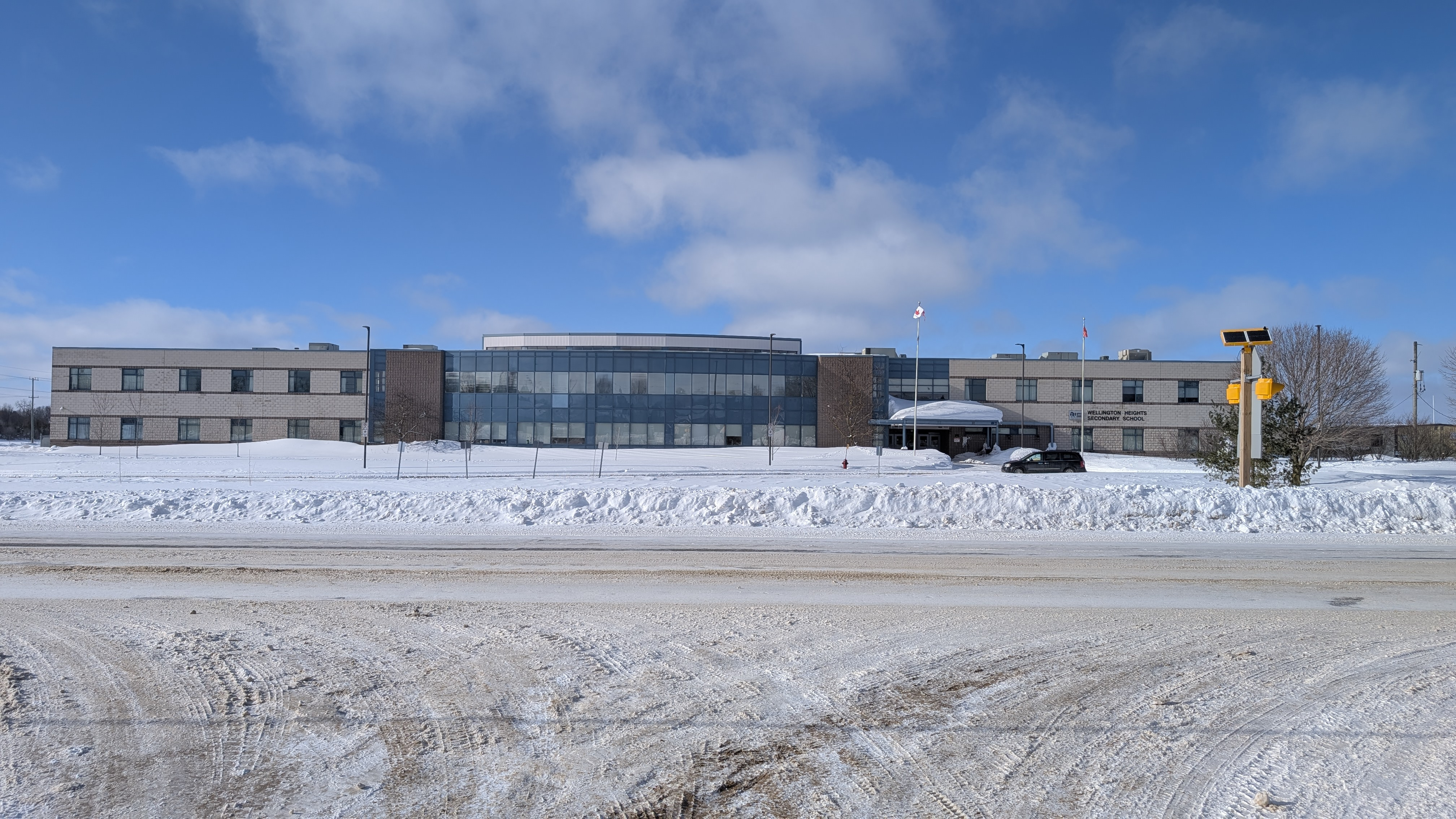

Location
- 405 Sligo Road East; Mount Forest, Ontario, N0G 2L2; Canada; 43.99095°N 80.73688°W

Information
- School type: Secondary
- Motto: Pride, Respect, Friendship
- Founded: 2004
- School board: Upper Grand District School Board
- Superintendent: Patrick Hamilton
- Area trustee: Robin Ross
- School number: 953555
- Principal: Brent Bloch
- Grades: 9-12
- Enrollment: 438 (September 6, 2022)
- Language: English
- Area: Wellington North
- Colours: Blue, Black, Grey and White
- Mascot: Marty Wolverine
- Team name: Wolverines
- Website: website.ugdsb.on.ca/whss

Wellington Heights Secondary School (WHSS) is a high school in Mount Forest, Ontario, Canada. The school is home of the "Wellington Heights Wolverines". The principal is Brent Bloch and the vice-principal is Pam Eurig. WHSS was built in 2004 due to the closure of the high schools in Mount Forest and Arthur. It serves students from all over North Wellington county, including the towns of Mount Forest, Arthur, Conn, Damascus, and Kenilworth. WHSS is part of the Upper Grand District School Board.

WHSS has had success among its academic, sport, and construction teams. The boys senior soccer team advanced to OFSAA, and the school's badminton and golf teams are traditional favorites within the district. As of November 2017, the junior girls' basketball team has won three consecutive CWOSSA championships. Wellington Heights has also seen success at Skills Canada winning provincial gold. The 2007 Science Olympics team also traveled to McMaster Engineering; and Science Olympics and received a gold medal for the "Speeding Brain" competition, where they had to devise a procedure to determine the speed at which information travels to the brain.

In 2019, Wellington Heights Secondary School chose to cut the music program, as well as the school's Concert Band, citing lack of student course selection and lack of qualified teachers.
