= Saint James Catholic High School (Guelph) =

St. James Catholic High School
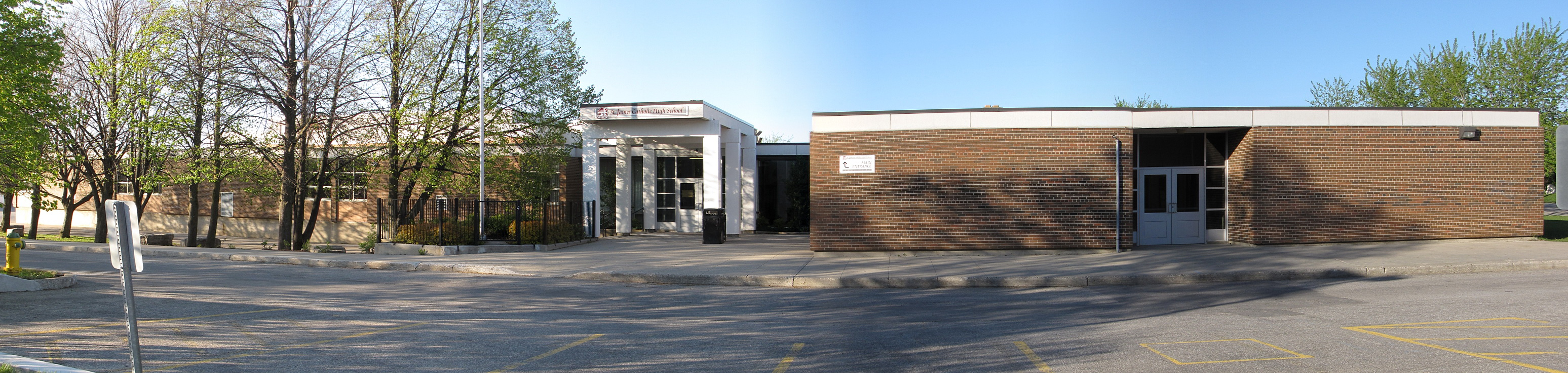

Location
- 57 Victoria Road North; Guelph, Ontario, N1E 5G9; Canada; 43.55996°N 80.23175°W

Information
- School type: High school
- Motto: Honour is My Guide
- Religious affiliation: Catholic
- Founded: 1952
- School board: Wellington Catholic District School Board
- Area trustee: Rev. Dennis Noon, Chairperson
- School number: 798690
- Principal: Stephen Gulyas
- Grades: 9-12
- Language: English
- Colours: Burgundy, Black, and Grey
- Mascot: Roary the Lion
- Team name: Lions
- Website: stjames.wellingtoncdsb.ca

St. James Catholic High School is a Grade 9 to 12 Catholic secondary school located in Guelph, Ontario and is part of the Wellington Catholic District School Board.

== History ==
St. James was created in the 1950s as a junior high school for Catholic students but became a full high school in the mid-1980s. When the original Bishop Macdonell Catholic High School closed down in the mid-1990s, St. James inherited many of Bishop Mac's students along with Our Lady of Lourdes Catholic High School leading to a quick rise in school population and the subsequent construction of a new wing. Today, with the completion of the new Bishop Macdonell Catholic High School, most of the students come from the eastern and some northern parts of Guelph as well as from Wellington County.

== See also ==
- Education in Ontario
- List of secondary schools in Ontario
