= CIWN-FM =

Community radio station in Mount Forest, Ontario

Coordinates: 43°57′46.08″N 80°42′00.00″W

CIWN-FM is a community radio station in Mount Forest, Ontario, Canada, which broadcasts at 88.7 MHz with an effective radiated power of 1,648 watts (non-directional antenna with an effective height of antenna above average terrain of 73.1 metres). Owned by Saugeen Community Radio, was granted approval by the CRTC on September 17, 2013.

Signal testing began in August 2015 and the station officially went live with music and announcers on November 23, 2015. The station's first contest was to have listeners suggest a name. The overwhelming winning name was The River. From December 22, 2015, CIWN is now known as 88.7 The River.

The River moved to their current location 248 Main Street N Mount Forest in early 2017.

Currently, the station has over twenty dedicated on air personalities as well as production crew.

== Featured Shows and Programs ==
- Barometer- A one hour long talk show featuring numerous guests with a different topic each week.
- Broadway Hits and Bits- A one hour long show playing specifically music from Broadway and the movies, with interluded spoken trivia and stories from the host.
- Low Blow Radio- A show focusing specifically on news from MMA, WWE, UFC of the week before. The host talk in depth about their opinions.
- Lutheran Hour- A half an hour church service provided by numerous local churches in Wellington County.
- The Morning Show with Java Joe Wettlaufer- A show played every weekday morning from 6-10am featuring funny, unpredictable and improvised conversation about a variety of current topics.
- The Outdoorz Guyz- A talk show all about camping, hunting, fishing and outdoor family activities.
- Town Hall- A popular talk show hosted by members of the local Wellington County community regarding national, provincial and local current events with a twist.
- Jazz and Blues Show- A five-hour marathon of only jazz and blues every Sunday night.
- Rob and Cara's Rockin' Country Show- Rob likes rock and Cara likes country, the show is a mash of the two genres alternating between the best rock and country songs.

== Events ==
In May 2019, The River hosted a twenty-four Radio-thon in order to raise money to construct a splash pad in Mount Forest. It was a success and $28,000.00 was raised directly for the community.

In 2019, The River hosted The River Classic Golf Tournament in association with Big Brothers Big Sisters of Wellington County (https://bigbrothersbigsisters.ca/find-agency-near/centre-wellington-on/), Crimestoppers of Guelph Wellington (https://crimestoppersguelphwellington.com/) and Get in Touch for Hutch (https://getintouchforhutch.com/) .
