= Our Lady of Lourdes Catholic High School (Guelph) =

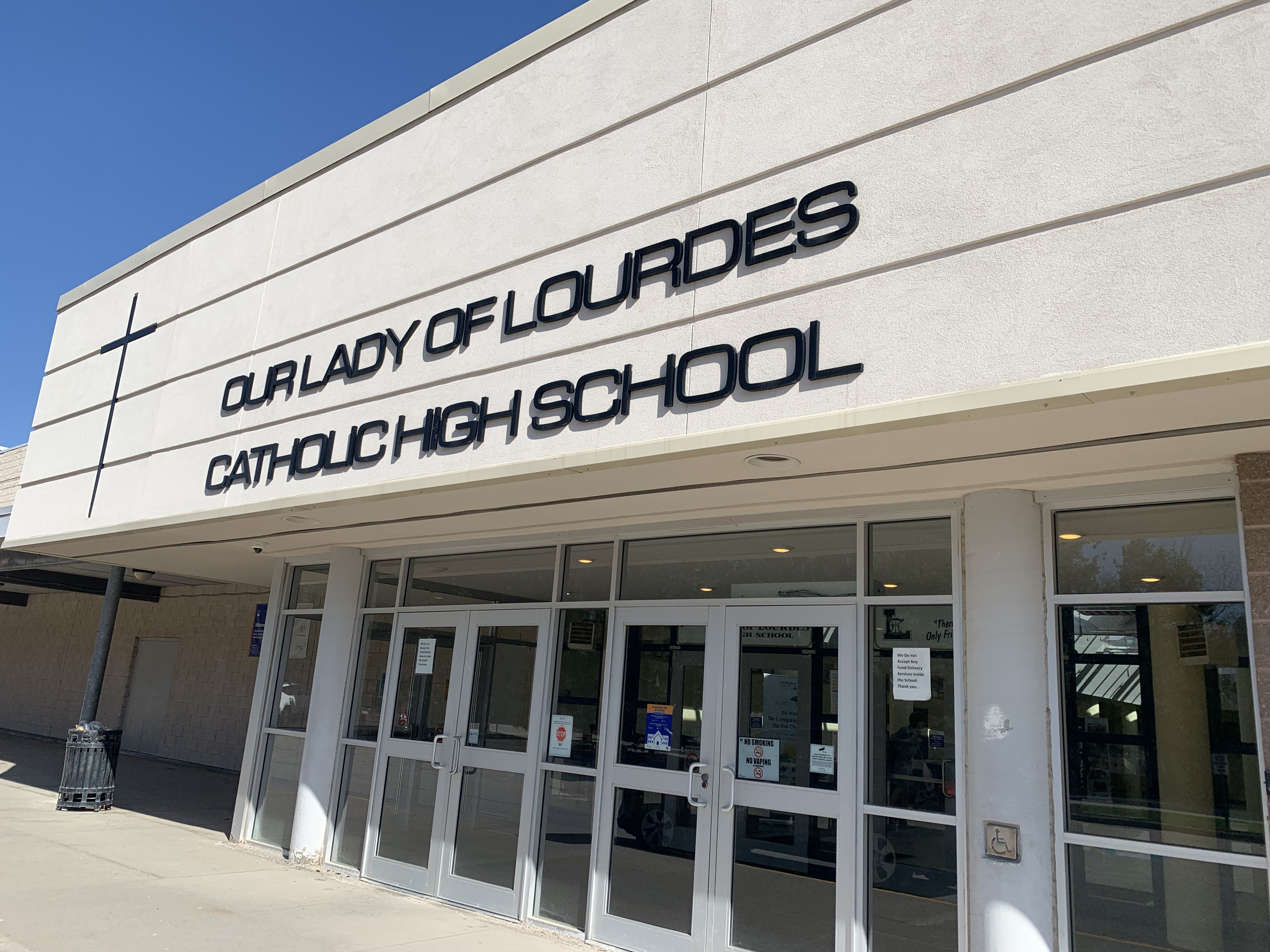

Location
- 54 Westmount Road; Guelph, Ontario, N1H 5H7; Canada; 43°32′52″N 80°16′05″W

Information
- School type: High school
- Motto: “Knowledge, Goodness and Discipline”
- Religious affiliation: Roman Catholic
- Founded: 1965
- School board: Wellington Catholic District School Board
- School number: 745529
- Principal: Valerie Marks
- Grades: 9-12
- Language: English
- Colours: Navy blue, gold and white
- Team name: Lancers
- Website: ourladyoflourdes.wellingtoncdsb.ca

Our Lady of Lourdes Catholic High School is a Grades 9–12 catholic secondary school in Guelph, Ontario, Canada and is part of the Wellington Catholic District School Board. The commonly used abbreviation for the school's name is OLOL.

== History ==
Founded in 1965 as a Junior School for Catholic students, it became a full high school in the mid-1980s. When the original Bishop Macdonell Catholic High School closed down in the mid-1990s, Lourdes inherited many of Bishop Mac's students, including Guelph Storm players, which led to a substantial increase in the school's population and the subsequent construction of a new wings in the early 1990s. Today, with the completion of the new Bishop Macdonell Catholic High School, most of the students come from the west end and some northern parts of Guelph.

== See also ==
- Education in Ontario
- List of secondary schools in Ontario
