= Wellington Catholic District School Board =

Catholic school board in Ontario, Canada

Address
- 255 Speedvale Ave. West Guelph, Ontario, N1H 1C5; Canada
- Coordinates: 43.54770°N 80.24757°W

District information
- Superintendent: Tracy McLennan (Associate Director); Betty Farrell (Superintendent of Student Achievement); Marylin Dawson (Superintendent of Student Achievement); Sandra Cummings (Superintendent of Student Achievement); Brian Capovilla (Executive Superintendent Human Resources & Leadership Development)
- Chair of the board: Vikki Dupuis
- Director of education: Michael Glazier
- Schools: 18 elementary schools 4 secondary schools
- Budget: CA$95.4mil million (2014)

Students and staff
- Students: 9,500 Elementary and Secondary students

Other information
- Board of trustees: Vikki Dupuis (Chair); Marino Gazzola (Vice Chair); Sebastian Dal Bo; Andrew Finoro; Cassandra O'Donnell; Joe Tersigni
- Website: www.wellingtoncdsb.ca

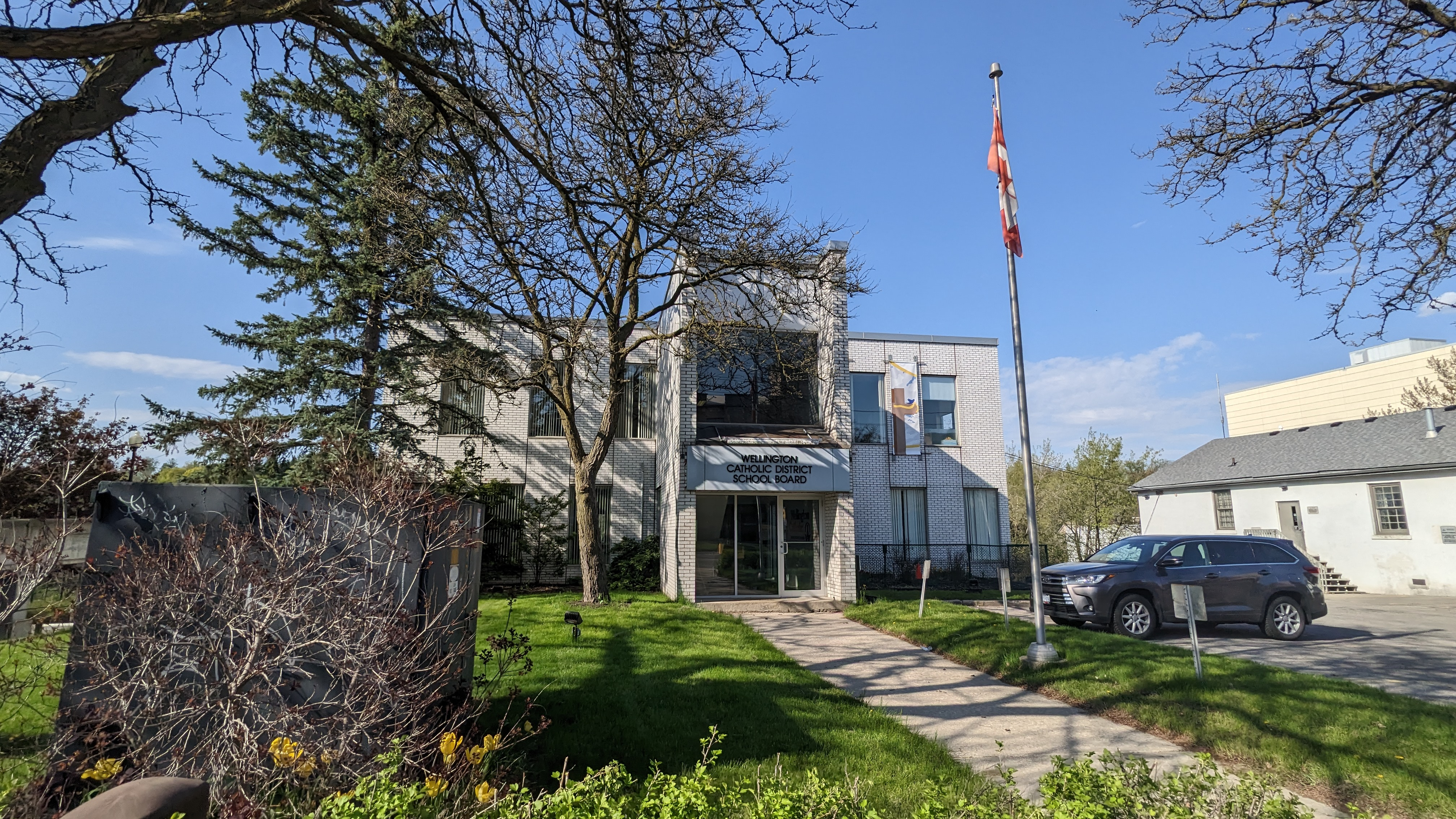
Photograph of Wellington Catholic District School Board

The Wellington Catholic District School Board is a school board in Ontario, Canada, serving the students of the City of Guelph and Wellington County. There are 4 high schools and 18 elementary schools serving roughly 9,500 students.

== History ==
The Wellington Catholic District School Board is the successor to the Wellington Catholic Separate School Board (French: Conseil des écoles séparées catholiques de Wellington), which was established in the mid-1960s when it operated English and French schools. In 1998, after the Fewer School Boards Act of 1997 was passed, the boards became as follows:

- The English-language Separate District School Board No. 48
- The French-language Separate District School Board No. 64, which evolved into Conseil scolaire de district catholique Centre-Sud

English-language Separate District School Board No. 48 became known as the Wellington Catholic District School Board in 1999.

== Program ==
Wellington Catholic provides education from Kindergarten to Grade 12.

The board also provides early literacy programs to support children in Grades 1 through 3. Full Day Kindergarten is available at all elementary Catholic schools.

== Schools ==
County elementary schools

- Sacred Heart, Rockwood
- St. John Catholic School, Arthur
- St. John Brebeuf Catholic School, Erin
- St. Joseph Catholic School, Fergus
- St. Mary Catholic School, Elora
- St. Mary Catholic School, Mount Forest
- St. Martin of Tours, Drayton (opening in September 2027)

Guelph's elementary schools

- Holy Rosary Catholic School
- Holy Trinity Catholic School
- Mary Phelan Catholic School
- Sacred Heart Catholic School
- St. Francis of Assisi Catholic School
- St. Ignatius of Loyola Catholic School
- St. John Catholic School
- St. Joseph Catholic School
- St. Michael Catholic School
- St. Patrick Catholic School
- St. Paul Catholic School
- St. Peter Catholic School

Secondary schools - City of Guelph

- Bishop Macdonell Catholic High School
- Our Lady of Lourdes Catholic High School
- Saint James Catholic High School
- St. John Bosco

Former schools

- Sacred Heart Catholic School, Kenilworth
- St. Bernadette Catholic School, Guelph
- St. Stanislaus Catholic School, Guelph (now St. John Bosco)
- École élémentaire catholique Saint-René-Goupil, Guelph
- Former Bishop Macdonell Catholic High School, Downtown Guelph

== See also ==
- List of school districts in Ontario
- List of high schools in Ontario
