= 2001 Ontario Nokia Cup =

- Host city: Woodstock, Ontario
- Arena: Woodstock District Community Complex
- Dates: February 5-11
- Winner: Team Middaugh
- Curling club: St. George's Golf and Country Club, Toronto, Ontario
- Skip: Wayne Middaugh
- Third: Graeme McCarrel
- Second: Ian Tetley
- Lead: Scott Bailey
- Finalist: John Morris

The 2001 Nokia Cup, southern Ontario men's provincial curling championship was held February 5-11 at the Woodstock District Community Complex in Woodstock, Ontario. The winning Wayne Middaugh rink from Toronto would represent Ontario at the 2001 Nokia Brier in Ottawa. This would be the first year that the Page playoff system would be used in provincial playdowns.

== Teams ==
Skip	Third	Second	Lead
Bryan Cochrane	Doug Johnston	Ian MacAulay	John Steski
Peter Corner	Pierre Charette	Todd Brandwood	Scott Foster
Glenn Howard	Richard Hart	Collin Mitchell	Jason Mitchell
Bob Ingram	Larry Smyth	Joe Griffore	Jim Brackett
Brent Kirkham	Steve Hambrook	Dan Baird	Dan Cheney
Ron Long	Kevin Caughlin	Steve Henderson	Christopher Dion
Wayne Middaugh	Graeme McCarrel	Ian Tetley	Scott Bailey
Rich Moffatt	Howard Rajala	Chris Fulton	Paul Fadden
John Morris	Joe Frans	Craig Savill	Brent Laing
Bob Turcotte	Roy Weigand	Ken McDermot	Steve McDermot

== Standings ==
Skip	Club	Wins	Losses
Glenn Howard	Coldwater and District Curling Club	7	2
Wayne Middaugh	St. George's Golf and Country Club	7	2
John Morris	Stayner Granite Club	6	3
Rich Moffatt	Rideau Curling Club	5	4
Bryan Cochrane	Ottawa Curling Club	5	4
Bob Turcotte	Scarboro Golf and Country Club	5	4
Ron Long	Burlington Golf and Country Club	4	5
Peter Corner	Glendale Golf and Country Club	3	6
Brent Kirkham	Pakenham Curling Club	2	7
Bob Ingram	Ridgetown Curling Club	1	8

== Tie breakers ==
- Turcotte 9-4 Cochrane
- Moffatt 8-4 Turcotte

== Playoffs ==
Page playoff system
1	Glenn Howard	2
2	Wayne Middaugh	14
3	John Morris	6
4	Rich Moffatt	3

Semifinal
1	Glenn Howard	3
3	John Morris	5

Final
2	Wayne Middaugh	4
3	John Morris	3

== Sources ==
- Nokia Cup - Coverage on curlingzone.com
