= Reginald Birchall =

English conman and murderer

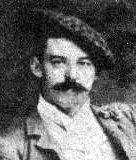
Reginald Birchall

John Reginald Birchall (aka Lord Frederick A. Somerset) (25 May 1866 – 14 November 1890) was a British conman who was convicted of killing one of his victims in Canada. He was hanged at Woodstock, Ontario.

== Crime ==
Born into a wealthy family in Lancashire, England, Birchall entered Lincoln College, Oxford in 1885. While at Lincoln, where he founded the Black and Tan Club, Birchall spent his time partying and incurring debt. In 1888, Birchall was forced to leave college and sell off his inheritance to pay his debts. That same year, he paid £600 for a property in Woodstock, Ontario. After eloping with his fiancée, Florence Stevenson, the couple travelled to Canada.

When they arrived in Woodstock, they discovered that the property was a small farm, not an estate. After six months of creating more debt in Woodstock, the couple returned to England.

Once in England, Birchall concocted a scheme to defraud several wealthy people. He took out an advertisement in a London newspaper claiming to be the owner of a prosperous horse farm in Canada who was looking for investors. His plan was to take the money, place bets in the Derby horse race, and pay back the investors with his winnings. However, the British investors wanted to inspect the Canadian farm and its financial records before making an investment.

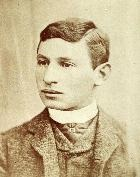
Victim Frederick Benwell

In February 1890, the Birchalls and the investors arrived in New York City and then travelled to Buffalo, New York. At this point, Birchall took Frederick Benwell, the son of the biggest potential investor, to Ontario to view the farm. After arriving near Woodstock, Birchall led Benwell into the woods, then shot him twice in the back of the head. Birchall then returned to Buffalo, telling the other investors that Benway had decided to return to England separately. However, on February 20, Birchall telegraphed Benwell's father in England, saying that his son had agreed to the investment and he should immediately wire over £500.

On February 23, 1890, hunters found a body in a swamp in Princeton, Ontario. Clothing tags had been removed, and a watch was found close to the body. Still in Buffalo, one of Birchall's investors saw a picture of the body in a newspaper and recognized him as Benwell. He travelled to Ontario to identify the body and speak with police.

Birchall was arrested in Niagara Falls, Ontario on March 3 and transported back to Princeton, Ontario. Birchall denied murdering Benwell.

== Trial and execution ==
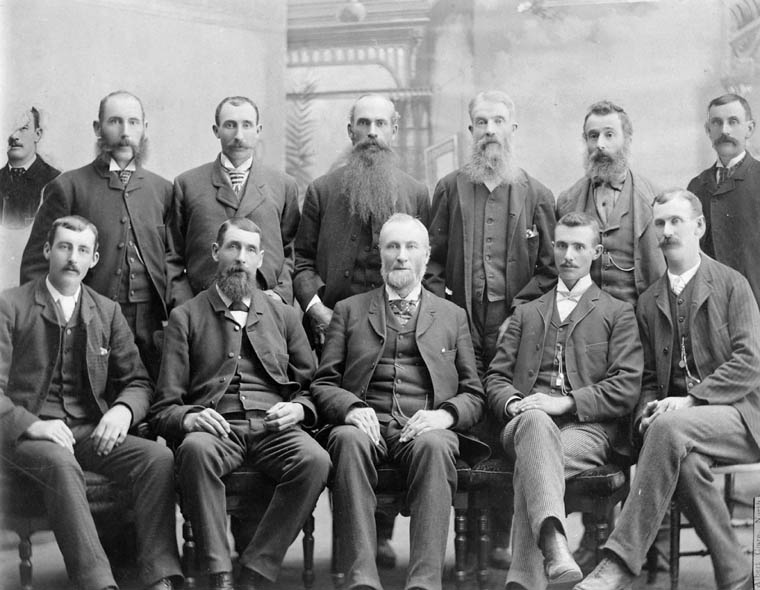
The jury on the Birchall trial

On September 22, Birchall's trial started at Woodstock's Town Hall. Given that both the suspect and the victim were members of the British gentry, the trial garnered substantial attention. News organizations from England, France, Germany, and Italy covered the trial. Birchall was convicted of murder based on circumstantial evidence and sentenced to death on September 30. Birchall professed his innocence to the end. He wrote a long account of the affair while in prison. This memoir was published in an attempt to create an income for his wife after his death.

Birchall was hanged on November 14, 1890. He was buried in the courtyard of the Woodstock City Gaol, where he still remains. The swamp in Princeton was called "Benwell Swamp" by the locals.
