= Henry Vansittart (Royal Navy officer) =

British Royal Navy vice admiral

Vice-Admiral Henry Vansittart
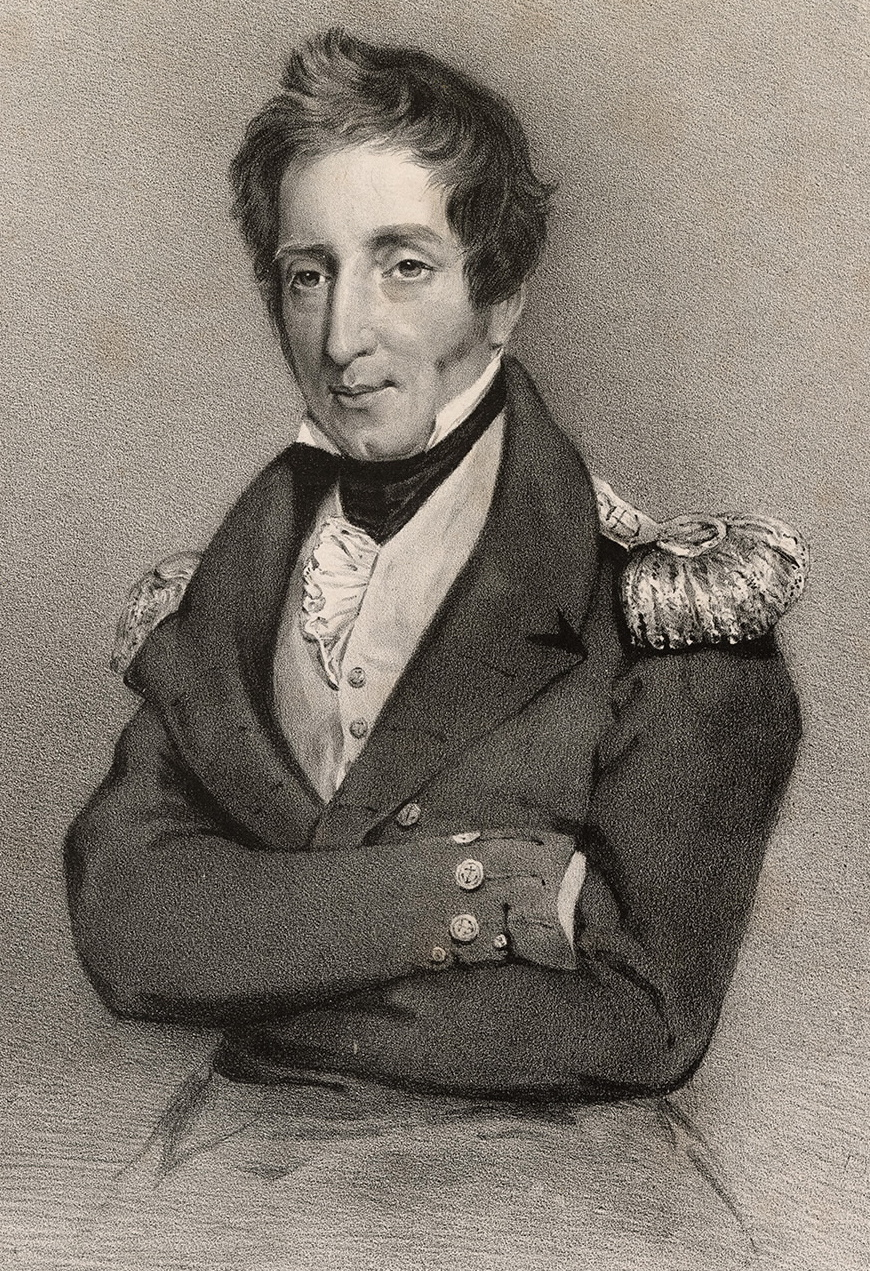
- Born: 17 April 1777; George Street, Hanover Square
- Died: 21 March 1843 (aged 65); Woodstock, Ontario
- Spouse: Mary Charity Pennefather (m. 1809–1834)
- Military career
- Allegiance: United Kingdom
- Branch: Royal Navy
- Service years: 1788–1843
- Rank: Vice-Admiral
- Commands: HMS Hermes; HMS Bonetta; HMS Abergavenny; HMS Thunderer; HMS Magicienne; HMS Fortunee; HMS Clarence
- Conflicts: French Revolutionary Wars; Siege of Toulon (WIA); Siege of Calvi; Capitulation of Saldanha Bay; Napoleonic Wars

Vice-Admiral Henry Vansittart (17 April 1777 – 21 March 1843) was a British Royal Navy vice admiral.

== Biography ==
Vansittart was the fifth son of George Vansittart (1745–1825) of Bisham Abbey, Berkshire, who married, 24 October 1767, Sarah, daughter of the Rev. Sir James Stonhouse, bart., was born in George Street, Hanover Square, on 17 April 1777. George Henry Vansittart, was his elder brother. Henry Vansittart, the governor of Bengal, was his uncle, and Nicholas, first baron Bexley, his first cousin. Having been entered on the books of the Scipio, guardship in the Medway, in October 1788, he was afterwards nominally in the Boyne, guardship in the Thames, and probably actually served in the Pegasus on the Newfoundland station in 1791. In 1792 he was in the Hannibal, stationed at Plymouth, and in 1793 went out to the Mediterranean in the Princess Royal, flagship of Rear-admiral Samuel Goodall. During the siege of Toulon by the republican army he was severely wounded. After the evacuation of the place he was moved into L'Aigle, with Captain Samuel Hood, served at the siege of Calvi, and was in October 1794 moved into the Victory, in which he returned to England.

On 21 February 1795 he was promoted to be lieutenant of the Stately, in which he was present at the capture of the Cape of Good Hope, and of the Dutch squadron in Saldanha Bay. He was then moved into the Monarch, Elphinstone's flagship, and returned in her to England. He was next appointed to the Queen Charlotte, Keith's flagship in the Channel; and on 30 May 1798 was promoted to be commander of the Hermes. From her he was moved to the Bonetta, which he took out to Jamaica; and on 13 February 1801 he was posted to the Abergavenny stationed at Port Royal. In July he returned to England in the Thunderer, and, after a few months on half-pay, was appointed, in April 1802 to the Magicienne, from which, in January 1803, he was moved to the Fortunée of 36 guns. For upwards of nine years he commanded this ship in the North Sea, off Boulogne, in the Channel, in the West Indies, and in the Mediterranean, for the most part in active cruising and in convoy service. In August 1812 he was moved into the 74-gun ship Clarence, till March 1814.

With the exception of a few months in 1801–2 he had served continuously from 1791. He became a rear-admiral on 22 July 1830, vice-admiral on 23 November 1841, and died on 21 March 1843 at his seat, Eastwood, Woodstock, Canada. He married, in 1809, Mary Charity (d. 1834), daughter of the Rev. John Pennefather, and left issue.
