= Tigercat Industries =

Canadian manufacturer of heavy equipment

- Industry: Manufacturing
- Founded: 1992
- Founder: Ken MacDonald
- Headquarters: Brantford, Ontario, Canada
- Key people: Tony Iarocci, Ken MacDonald, Grant Somerville
- Products: Forestry and materials handling equipment

Tigercat Industries is a Canadian manufacturer of heavy equipment, primarily for forestry.

== History ==
Tigercat began as a partnership between loggers and MacDonald Steel, a fabricator, to make specialty forestry products. The first product, the Tigercat 726 feller buncher, came out in 1992. Initial production was at MacDonald Steel's facility in Cambridge, Ontario with dedicated facilities opening in Brantford and Woodstock, Ontario. The Tigercat 726 was designed to suit the Southeastern United States market. MacDonald Steel owner Ken MacDonald served as the initial CEO with Tony Iarocci as president.

In 1995 Tigercat opened a primary production site in Paris, Ontario. They significantly expanded the site in 2014. The region was historically a major production center for heavy machinery with John Deere, Caterpillar Inc., Massey Ferguson, and Cockshutt Plow Company having factories there. Those companies mostly moved away or changed their business substantially leaving Tigercat as the primary employer in the industry.

Iarocci stepped down as president in 2014 and was replaced by Grant Somerville. In 2020 the company launched a new "TCi" brand for new products with applications beyond timber harvesting. The first product was the TCi 920 dozer. In 2020 it acquired Ragnar Original Innovations (ROI) of Chester, New Hampshire which manufactures materials handing equipment. Somerville was replaced as president by MacDonald in 2022.

== Products ==
- 726 feller buncher
- LSX870D shovel logger
- 880E logger
- 6040 mobile carbonizer (for making biochar)
- 570 harvesting head
- TCi 920 forestry dozer
