= Reeves Community Complex =

- Woodstock Community Centre
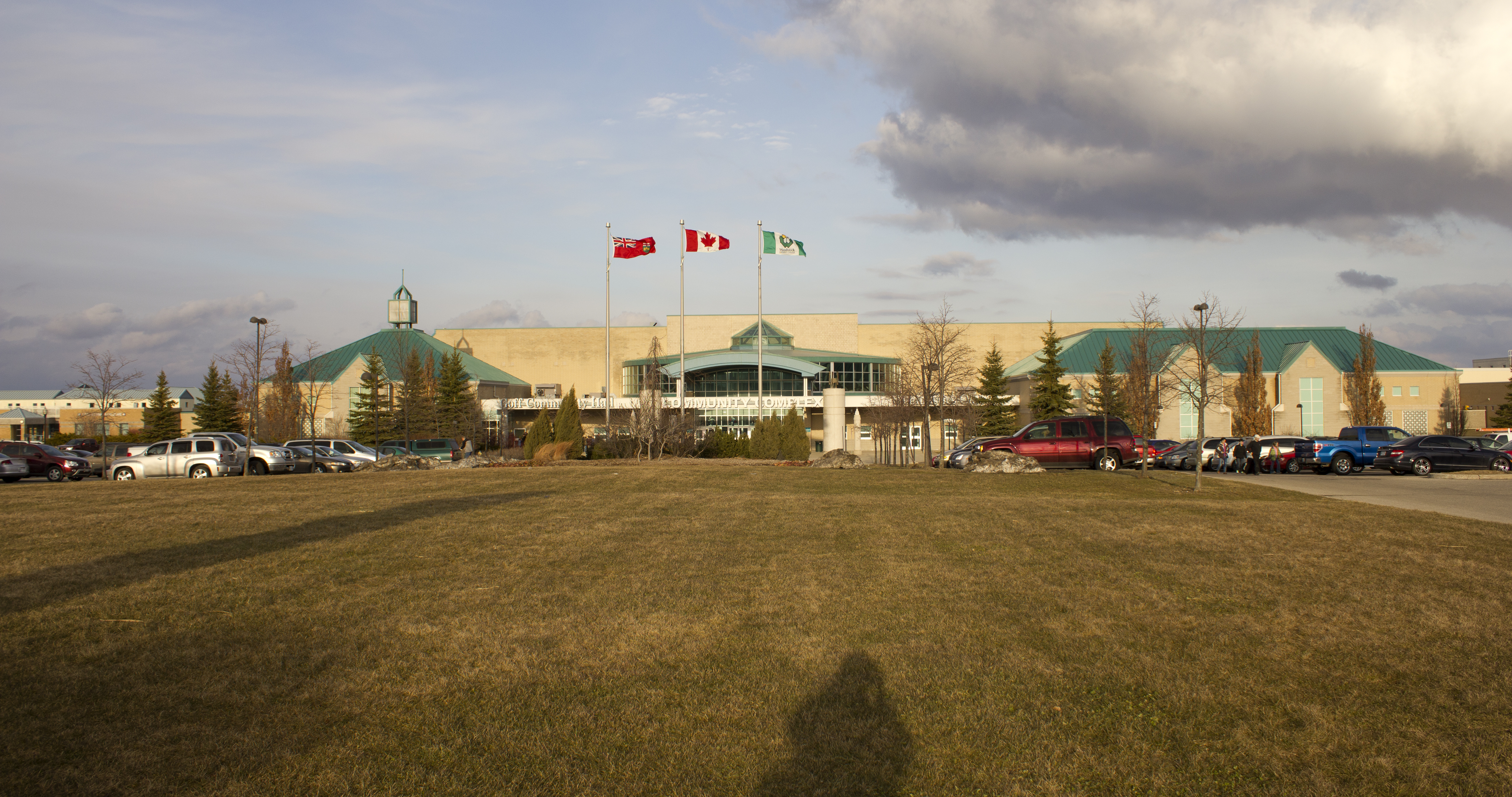
- Exterior of Reeves Community Complex
- Interactive map of Reeves Community Complex
- Former names: Woodstock District Community Complex
- Coordinates: 43.114267°N 80.751572°W
- Owner: City of Woodstock, Ontario
- Operator: Darren Hall
- Capacity: Main rink: 2000 (500 standing spaces); Secondary rink: 100
- Field size: 200' x 100' (main rink); 185" x 85' (secondary rink)

Construction
- Opened: July 1996
- Cost: $12,284,000.00
- Architect: Wong Gregersen
- Project manager: John Chu

Tenant
- Woodstock Navy-Vets

Website
- Official site

The Reeves Community Complex (formerly known as the Woodstock District Community Complex) is considered to be the social epicentre of the Canadian community of Woodstock, Ontario.

== Summary ==
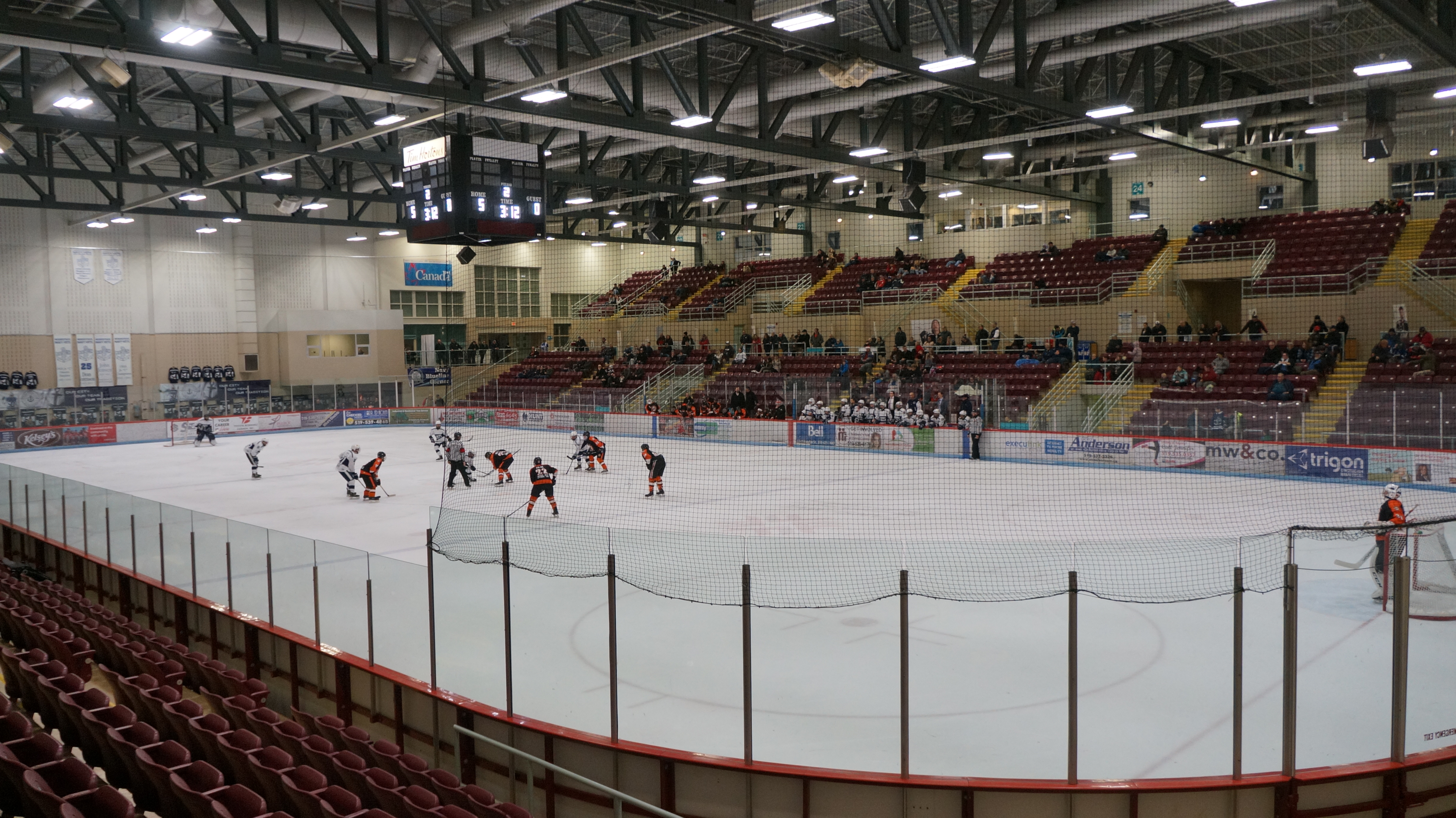
Interior

This facility is the host of Woodstock Navy-Vets hockey games from November to April and community events year-round for the general public as well as private organizations. Besides two ice rinks, the complex also hosts the Woodstock Gymnastics Club, a banquet hall, and an extension site for Fanshawe College. A Woodstock Sports Wall of Fame is also prominently displayed in the building's main foyer; displaying the local elite of the sporting world. The facility is run by the City of Woodstock.

One of the most recent major events using this community centre was the provincial qualifying rounds for the 2009 Tim Hortons Brier (also known as the 2009 TSC Stores Tankard). The competition took place from February 2 to February 8. The tournament attracted the best men's curling players from all over Ontario Glenn Howard was given the honour of representing the Ontario provincial curling team in the national tournament in Calgary at the Pengrowth Saddledome (now known as Scotiabank Saddledome).

The Complex also hosted the Ontario Tankard in 2001. It was also the venue for wrestling at the 2001 Canada Games.

In May 2020, the complex was renamed to the Reeves Community Complex, following an agreement with the City of Woodstock and the Dr. Leonard Reeves Foundation for the naming rights. The naming rights were sold for $300,000 and will last for 20 years.
