= Woodstock, Ontario =

Woodstock
- City (lower-tier)
- City of Woodstock
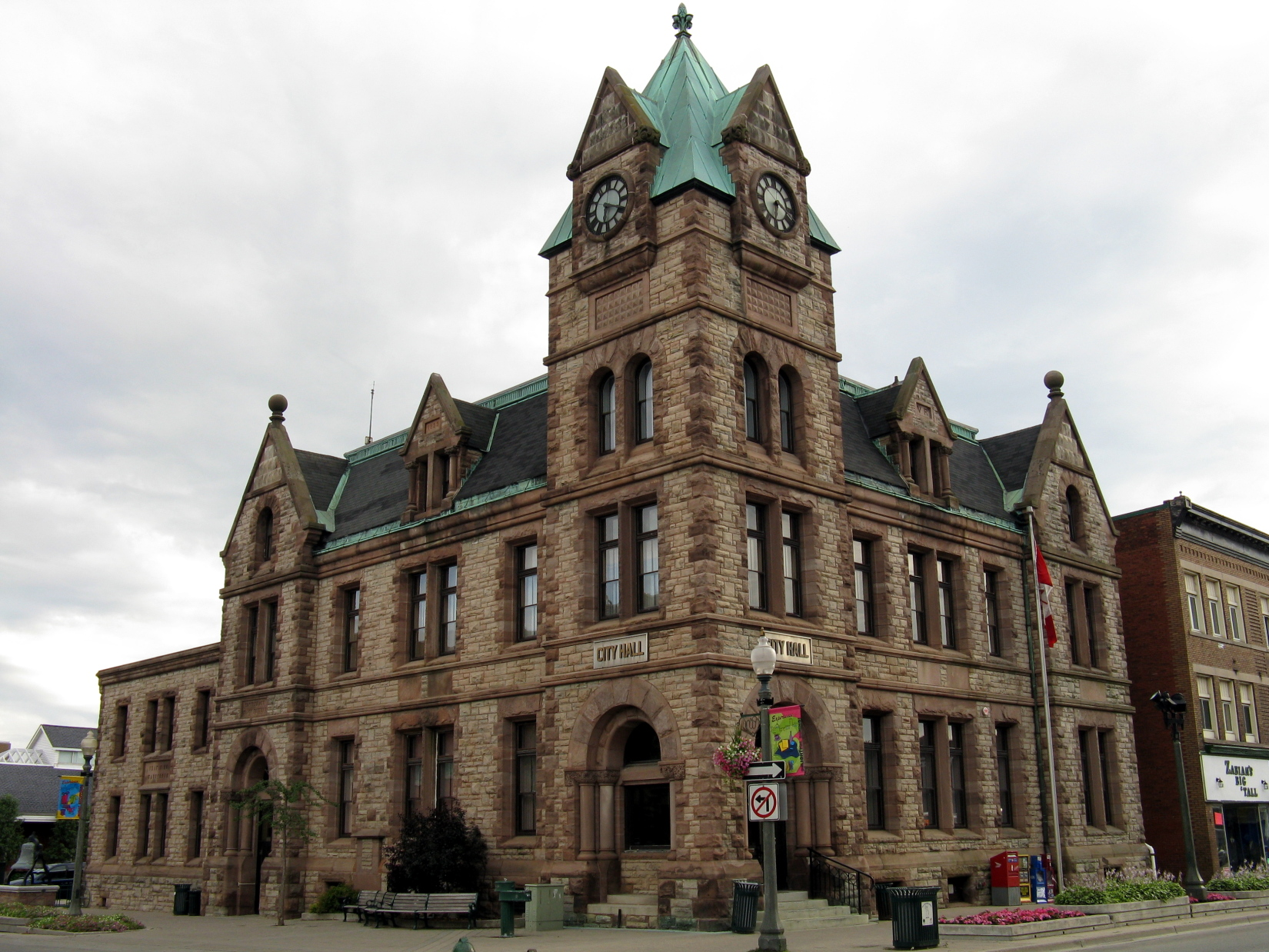
- Woodstock City Hall

- Logo
- Motto: The Friendly City
- Location within Southern Ontario
- Coordinates: 43°07′50″N 80°44′48″W
- Country: Canada
- Province: Ontario
- County: Oxford
- Established: 1800 (as town)
- 1891 (city)

Government
  - Mayor: Jerry Acchione
  - Governing Body: Woodstock City Council
  - MPs: Arpan Khanna
  - MPPs: Ernie Hardeman

Area
  - Total: 56.46 km^{2} (21.80 sq mi)
- Elevation: 300 m (980 ft)

Population (2021)
  - Total: 46,705
  - Density: 827.2/km^{2} (2,142/sq mi)
- Time zone: UTC−5 (EST)
  - Summer (DST): UTC−4 (EDT)
- Forward sortation area: N4S to N4T
- Area codes: 519, 226, and 548
- Website: www.cityofwoodstock.ca

Woodstock is a city in Southwestern Ontario, Canada. The city has a population of 46,705 according to the 2021 Canadian census. Woodstock is the seat of Oxford County, at the head of the Thames River, approximately 128 km from Toronto, and 43 km from London, Ontario. The city is known as the Dairy Capital of Canada and promotes itself as "The Friendly City".

Woodstock was first settled by European colonists and United Empire Loyalists in 1800, starting with Zacharias Burtch and Levi Luddington, and was incorporated as a town in 1851. Since then, Woodstock has maintained steady growth, and is now a small city in Southwestern Ontario. As a small historic city, Woodstock is one of the few cities in Ontario to still have all of its original administration buildings. The city has developed a strong economic focus towards manufacturing and tourism. It is also a market city for the surrounding agricultural industry.

Woodstock is home to a campus of Fanshawe College. The city plays host to a number of cultural and artistic exhibits, including the Woodstock Museum, a national historic site. Woodstock's summer festivals contribute to its tourism industry; however, its economic activity is centred on the manufacturing centre, the city being home to several auto-manufacturing factories. The city's west end has exceptionally well-preserved Victorian streetscapes; most notable of these streets is Vansittart Avenue, named after Admiral Henry Vansittart, one of the city's first settlers. Woodstock has a large community centre with a rink capable of accommodating 1,800 spectators for hockey games. The centre also has a large banquet hall and atrium which play host to many social gatherings for the community.

== History ==
The community was first settled in 1800 after it was determined by Sir John Graves Simcoe, governor of what was then known as Upper Canada, that the area would make a good townsite. The early settlers were generally American immigrants from New York state, such as Levi Burtch and Dr. Levi Hoyt Perry.

Increased immigration from Great Britain followed in the 1820s and 1830s, including the half pay officers Henry Vansittart and Andrew Drew. Admiral Vansittart commissioned Commander Andrew Drew to build a church (Old St. Paul's) in a new area of Oxford that was known as the "Town Plot". The men would later quarrel, which would lead to the construction of a second church known as "New St. Paul's".

In 1836 there were 200 people living in Woodstock, and by 1846 the population had grown to almost 1100 inhabitants. There were six churches or chapels, a jail, a court house, one bank agency, a school and two weekly newspapers. Several court and government offices were located here. Industry included two grist mills, a saw mill, a fulling mill, a brewery and a distillery and four wagon makers.

Woodstock was incorporated as a town in 1851 and had its first town meeting in the Royal Pavilion Hotel. This year also saw the start of the Town Hall and local government.

In 1901, Woodstock, with a population of nearly 9,000, petitioned the provincial legislature for city status and the "Town of Woodstock" was incorporated into the "City of Woodstock".

From 1900 to 1920, an electric streetcar ran down the streets of Woodstock; as well, after 1920, bricks were used to pave the main street of Woodstock. The bricks were later removed in the 1940s.

== Historical events ==
=== Mowat's provincial premiership ===
Sir Oliver Mowat, a native of Kingston, Ontario, served as member of the provincial parliament for the region from 1872 to 1896, during which time he was also premier of the province of Ontario.

=== 1890 Birchall Trial ===
The 1890 Trial began with the arrest of Reginald Birchall in Niagara Falls, Ontario. Birchall was held at the Woodstock jail for seven months until his murder trial began in September of that year. The trial took place at the Woodstock Town Hall as the Court House was under construction at the time. The trial received worldwide media coverage, with reporters camped out across from the Town Hall in the Oxford Hotel.

=== 1979 tornado ===
On August 7, 1979, the Woodstock area was hit by three tornadoes, two of which were rated F4 on the Fujita scale.

== Climate ==
Climate data for Woodstock (1981−2010)
Month	Jan	Feb	Mar	Apr	May	Jun	Jul	Aug	Sep	Oct	Nov	Dec	Year
Record high °C (°F)	18.3 (64.9)	20.0 (68.0)	25.0 (77.0)	30.5 (86.9)	35.0 (95.0)	37.0 (98.6)	38.9 (102.0)	36.1 (97.0)	37.2 (99.0)	29.4 (84.9)	22.8 (73.0)	18.0 (64.4)	38.9 (102.0)
Mean daily maximum °C (°F)	−1.9 (28.6)	−0.5 (31.1)	4.4 (39.9)	12.1 (53.8)	19.0 (66.2)	24.4 (75.9)	26.6 (79.9)	25.5 (77.9)	21.3 (70.3)	14.1 (57.4)	7.2 (45.0)	0.9 (33.6)	12.8 (55.0)
Daily mean °C (°F)	−5.8 (21.6)	−4.7 (23.5)	−0.3 (31.5)	6.8 (44.2)	13.1 (55.6)	18.5 (65.3)	20.8 (69.4)	19.8 (67.6)	15.7 (60.3)	9.2 (48.6)	3.5 (38.3)	−2.5 (27.5)	7.8 (46.0)
Mean daily minimum °C (°F)	−9.6 (14.7)	−8.9 (16.0)	−4.9 (23.2)	1.4 (34.5)	7.2 (45.0)	12.6 (54.7)	14.9 (58.8)	14.0 (57.2)	10.0 (50.0)	4.2 (39.6)	−0.3 (31.5)	−5.9 (21.4)	2.9 (37.2)
Record low °C (°F)	−36.7 (−34.1)	−32.2 (−26.0)	−31.1 (−24.0)	−16.7 (1.9)	−6.7 (19.9)	−0.5 (31.1)	2.8 (37.0)	0.6 (33.1)	−3.9 (25.0)	−10.6 (12.9)	−21.1 (−6.0)	−29.4 (−20.9)	−36.7 (−34.1)
Average precipitation mm (inches)	67.5 (2.66)	60.0 (2.36)	62.9 (2.48)	80.0 (3.15)	88.6 (3.49)	82.8 (3.26)	103.8 (4.09)	82.3 (3.24)	92.0 (3.62)	77.7 (3.06)	93.7 (3.69)	78.0 (3.07)	969.0 (38.15)
Average rainfall mm (inches)	34.9 (1.37)	35.0 (1.38)	43.7 (1.72)	75.1 (2.96)	88.5 (3.48)	82.8 (3.26)	103.8 (4.09)	82.3 (3.24)	92.0 (3.62)	76.2 (3.00)	85.5 (3.37)	49.1 (1.93)	848.8 (33.42)
Average snowfall cm (inches)	32.6 (12.8)	24.9 (9.8)	19.2 (7.6)	4.9 (1.9)	0.1 (0.0)	0.0 (0.0)	0.0 (0.0)	0.0 (0.0)	0.0 (0.0)	1.5 (0.6)	8.2 (3.2)	28.9 (11.4)	120.3 (47.4)
Average precipitation days (≥ 0.2 mm)	15.5	11.9	12.5	13.7	13.2	10.6	12.7	11.2	12.7	13.7	15.3	14.8	157.7
Average rainy days (≥ 0.2 mm)	5.0	5.2	7.3	12.4	13.2	10.6	12.7	11.2	12.7	13.7	12.4	7.3	123.5
Average snowy days (≥ 0.2 cm)	11.2	7.8	5.9	1.9	0.04	0.0	0.0	0.0	0.0	0.54	3.5	8.4	39.1
Mean monthly sunshine hours	82.9	93.8	130.1	170.8	238.3	260.0	297.5	263.6	208.7	167.8	87.5	66.7	2,067.8
Source: Environment Canada (sun 1951–1980)

== Demographics ==
Historical populations
Year	Pop.	±%
1841	1,085	—
1871	3,982	+267.0%
1881	5,373	+34.9%
1891	8,612	+60.3%
1901	8,833	+2.6%
1911	9,320	+5.5%
1921	9,935	+6.6%
1931	11,395	+14.7%
1941	12,339	+8.3%
1951	15,544	+26.0%
1961	20,486	+31.8%
1971	26,173	+27.8%
1981	26,603	+1.6%
1991	30,075	+13.1%
1996	32,253	+7.2%
2001	33,061	+2.5%
2006	35,480	+7.3%
2011	37,754	+6.4%
2016	40,902	+8.3%
2021	46,705	+14.2%

In the 2021 Census of Population conducted by Statistics Canada, Woodstock had a population of 46,705 living in 18,886 of its 19,528 total private dwellings, a change of 13.6% from its 2016 population of 41,098. With a land area of 56.46 km^{2} (21.80 sq mi), it had a population density of 827.2/km^{2} (2,142.5/sq mi) in 2021.

According to the 2016 Canadian Census, approximately 78.2% of residents were European Canadians, whereas 5.3% were visible minorities and 2.2% were aboriginal (including 1.4% First Nations). The largest visible minority group was Black Canadian with 1.6% of the population. No other visible minority makes up more than 1% of the population. The median household income was $68,213 as of 2016.

== Government ==
The city government, Woodstock City Council, consists of four city councillors, two city and county councillors, and the mayor who serves as the Head of Council. The current mayor, Jerry Acchione, was elected as mayor on October 24, 2022 after serving two terms as a city councillor.

Woodstock is the seat of Oxford County, with the County Administration Building located across from City Hall in the area of Dundas and Reeve Streets. The city is governed by both the city and Oxford county councils, each with specific "spheres of jurisdiction". During 2005, economic development services, then exclusive to the county, was negotiated away from them by former mayor Michael Harding.

Woodstock federal election results
Year	Liberal		Conservative		New Democratic		Green	
2021	24%	5,102	42%	8,794	21%	4,444	2%	518
2019	22%	4,600	43%	9,200	23%	4,858	8%	1,650

Woodstock provincial election results
Year	PC		New Democratic		Liberal		Green	
2022	48%	7,119	24%	3,555	16%	2,295	4%	661
2018	51%	9,319	34%	6,132	8%	1,501	4%	740

For provincial and federal elections, Woodstock is included in the riding of Oxford. Currently, the MP of Oxford is Arpan Khanna (Conservative), and the MPP is Ernie Hardeman (Progressive Conservative).

== Healthcare ==
Woodstock General Hospital was located on Riddell Street in central Woodstock for over a century. In the fall of 2011, the WGH moved to a new location in a newly developing area in the southern end of Woodstock. Through millions of dollars in local private donations, backed by government grants, the city now has a new state-of-the-art medical facility. The new hospital is close to highway 401, the busiest highway in North America, and has many upgrades including a helipad and an MRI/cancer centre. It caters to a population of about 55,000 people. It has a workforce of nearly 600 people and 270 volunteers.

Woodstock was the former home of the Oxford Regional Centre. Opened in 1906 as the Hospital for Epileptics, it was later renamed the Ontario Hospital in 1919. Originally on the west side of Highway 59, the hospital then expanded on the east side in the 1950s and transformed into a house for mentally disabled individuals. At its peak, the centre employed 1,500 people. It closed in 1996, and since then all buildings have been demolished except for part of the powerhouse, now the Brickhouse Brewpub - part of the Upper Thames Brewing Company, and the mess hall which has been converted into a community centre for Sally Creek. As well a carved insert with the words "Ontario Hospital" remains in the stone wall on the west side of Highway 59 north of Fairway Road. A polished black granite memorial to the institution sits at Dr. J. J. Williams Park on Lakeview Drive east of Highway 59.

Woodstock also has a variety of Provincial IHF Facilities and Specialists including Large outpatient Cardiology Centre KMH, which houses Cardiologists and Internal Medicine Specialists offering Cardiology Testing such as Echocardiograms, SPECT nuclear medicine, and Holter monitors.

== Sister cities ==
Woodstock has two sister cities: Sylvania, Ohio, United States, and Pesche, Italy.

== Culture ==
=== Festivals ===
- The Woodstock Wood Show
- The Woodstock Car Show & Shop
- The Ontario Woodworking Championships
- Canada's Outdoor Farm Show
- The Woodstock Fair
- Cultural Canvas
- Cowapolooza
- Oxford Creative Connections
- Woodstock Rotary Club Dragon Boat Festival
- Woodstock Rotary Festival of Music
- Summer Streetfest
- Woodstock Fleece Festival
- Woodstock Pet Expo

=== Year-round attractions ===
- Gallery Cinemas
- Theatre Woodstock
- OLG Slots
- Ross Butler Studio Agricultural Art Gallery

=== Cultural ===
- Woodstock Museum - National Historic Site
- Woodstock Art Gallery
- Theatre Woodstock
- Dairy Capital Of Canada

The Woodstock Art Gallery is located at 449 Dundas Street in the renovated John White Building. The Art Gallery, which originally started in the basement of the Woodstock Public Library, proudly showcases the work of Florence Carlyle.

Theatre Woodstock houses plays year-round in the former market building across from the museum.

== Downtown ==
Downtown Woodstock stretches from Vansittart Avenue to Huron Street on Dundas Street, the city's main street. It houses the city's banks, administration buildings, independent retailers and several restaurants. The majority of buildings are a century old. Downtown promotes itself through its Business Improvement Area members as a place to shop, work, play and dine. Although there are a few vacancies in the city centre, the downtown is full of beautiful historic buildings and several unique retail outlets. In the 1990s the city undertook an extensive makeover of the main street, adding many gardens and cobbled sidewalks. Every summer the main street is shut down for the city's "Summer Streetfest" celebrations, a mix of retail sales and various entertainment.

== Historical landmarks ==
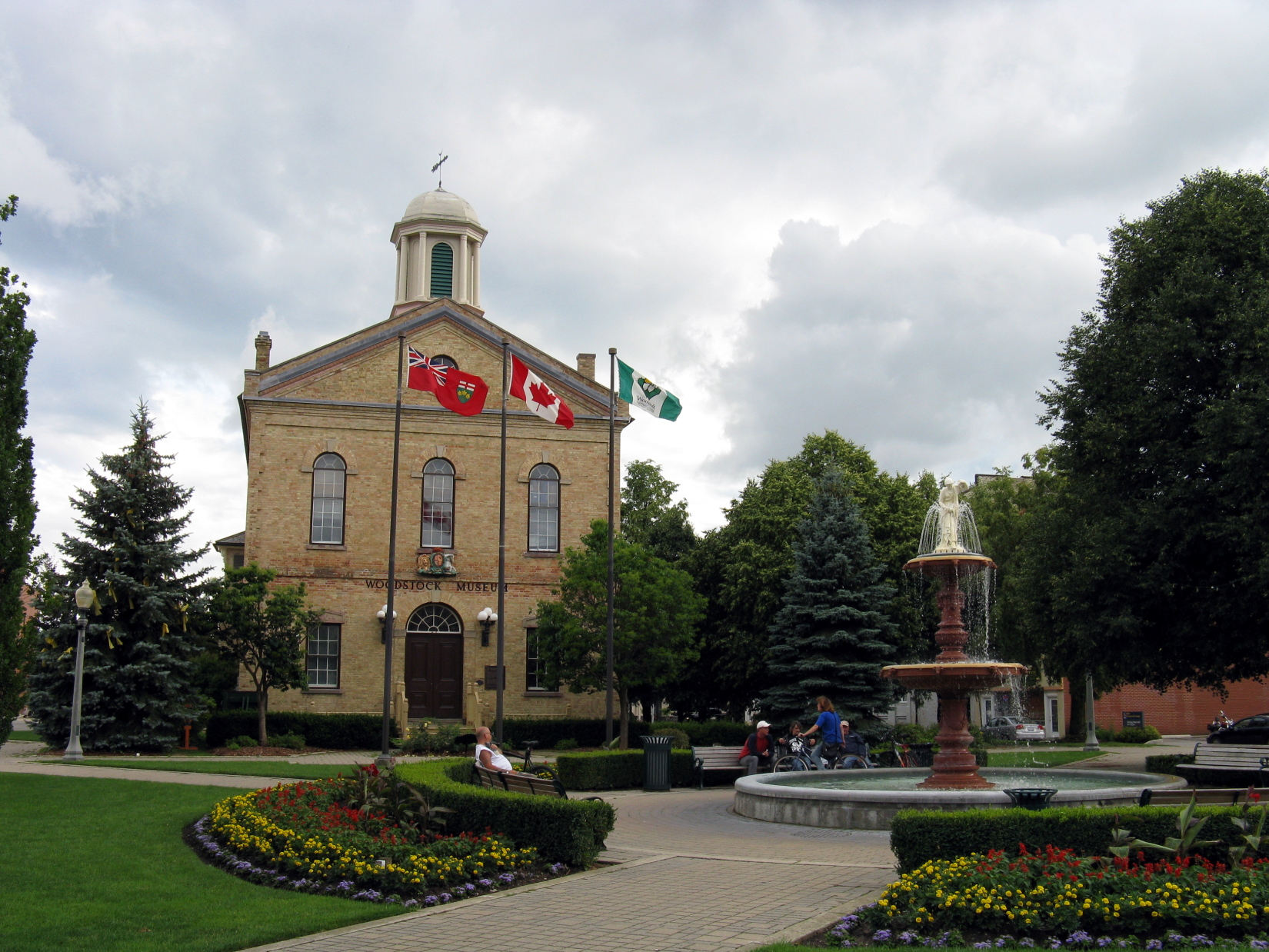

=== The Town Hall ===
The Old Town Hall, now the Woodstock Museum, NHS was built in 1853 and modelled architecturally on the Town Hall in Woodstock, England. Designed by Peter Craib, the Town Hall was built by David White, W.P. Dixon and William McKay. It is majestic for its size, with semi-circular windows and a domed cupola. It served as the first market, first fire hall, community hall, and lockup for the town, and was the location of the world-famous Birchall-Benwell murder trial in 1890. Canada's first elected female mayor of a City, Bernadette Smith, served here from 1952 to 1965, and the original town council chamber used from 1871 to 1968 inside has been restored. (Start, Turner, Gardhouse, Bennett, Historic Buildings of Woostock, Ontario)

=== The Market Building ===
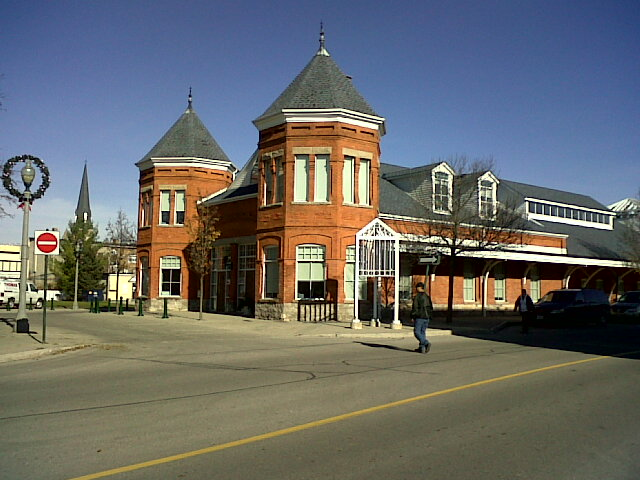
Market Building

The Woodstock Market was built in 1895 by the architect W.B. Ford, using 140,000 feet of lumber, 1 1/4 tons of nails, and 1 1/4 miles of putty on a site previously occupied by wooden market sheds. The low roof and wide canopies are typical of market construction in this period, and interesting features included the twin towers, the drinking fountain at the front door, and the use of stone in the trim. (Start, Turner, Gardhouse, Bennett, Historic Public Buildings of Woodstock, Ontario)

=== Woodstock Jail/Gaol ===
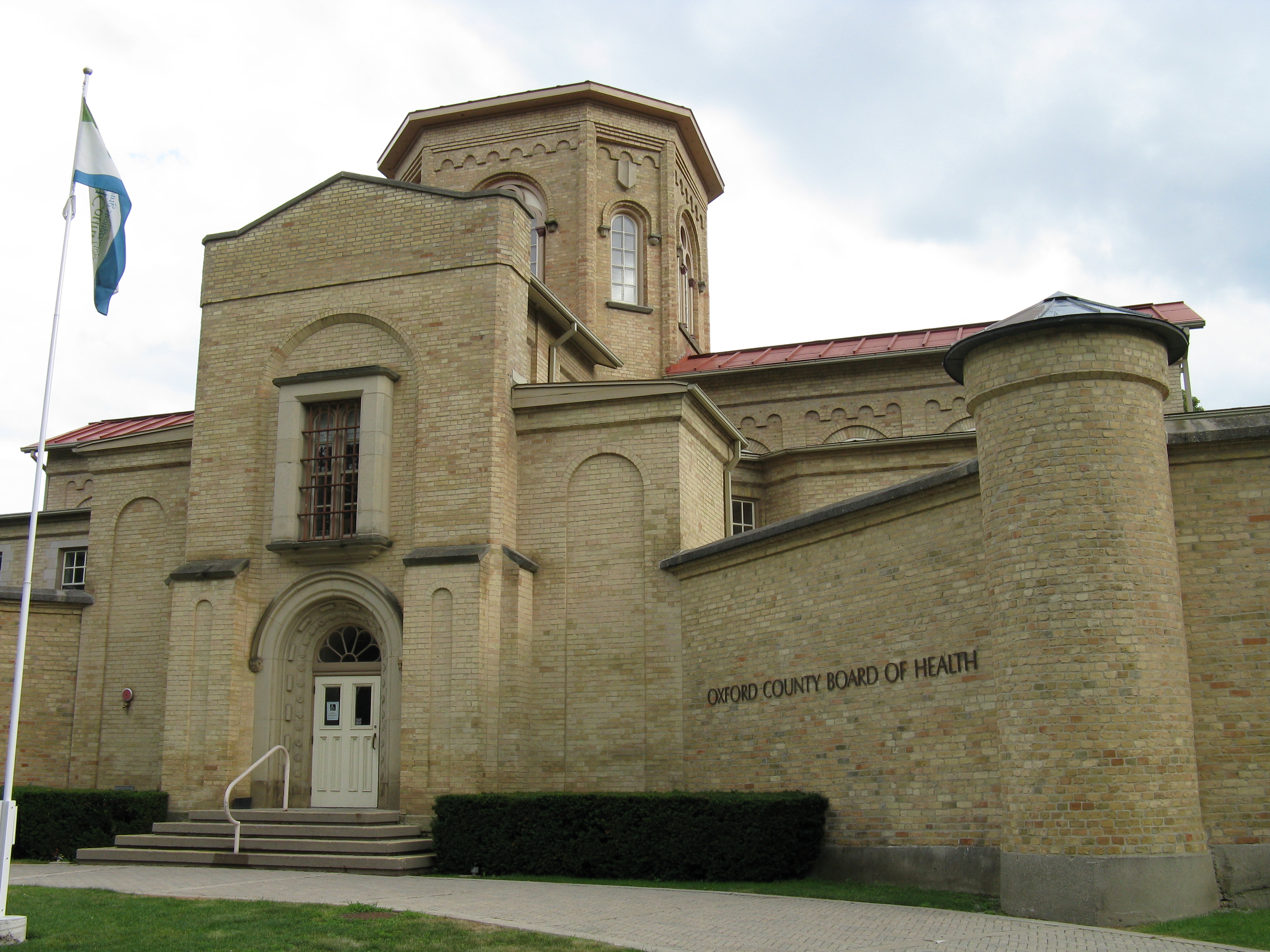
Oxford County Gaol

The old jail was built in 1854 by Hamilton architects Clark and Murray in the Italianate style, with many arches, and an octagonal 2 1/2-storey tower; in this case, the architecture camouflages the function of the institution. Four men and one woman were hanged in the yard, including the infamous Birchall, who posing as "Lord Somerset" duped the entire town and murdered his gentlemen farmer apprentice; this was Victorian Canada's most sensational murder case. The death mask at the entrance is of blind Thomas Cook, hanged in 1862 for murdering his wife; his head rolled into the crowd, and afterwards public hangings were discontinued. The building was recently restored by Carlos Ventin of The Ventin Group architects of Simcoe, after a decade of lobbying by the "Save the Jail" Committee, with spectacular results, and is now occupied by Oxford County Public Health.(Start, Turner, Gardhouse, Bennett, Historic Public Buildings of Woodstock, Ontario)

=== Woodstock Public Library ===
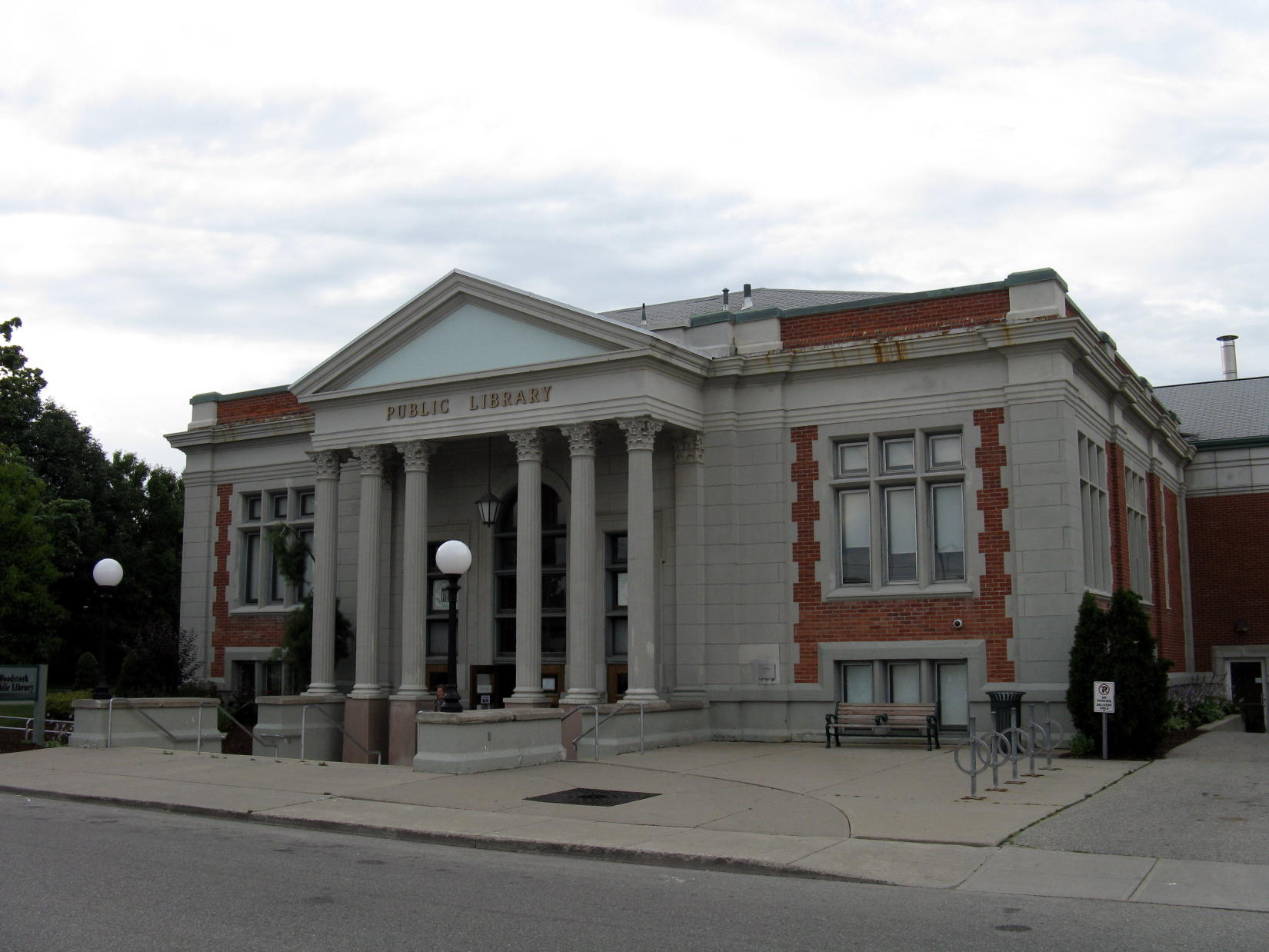
Woodstock Public Library

The Woodstock Public Library was built in 1909 by Chadwick and Beckett of Toronto on a Carnegie library grant, and it is considered one of the most attractive Carnegie libraries in Ontario. It is in classical revival style, with a graceful entrance, bi-chromatic brickwork, and well-balanced windows; the rotunda inside is beautifully proportioned and dramatic. The library traces its history back to a reading society formed in 1835 with Rev. William Bettridge of Old St. Paul's Church as president, and possesses the only complete set of minute books in the province dating back to 1835. Start, Turner, Gardhouse, Bennett, Historic Public Buildings of Woodstock, Ontario

=== Oxford County Court House ===
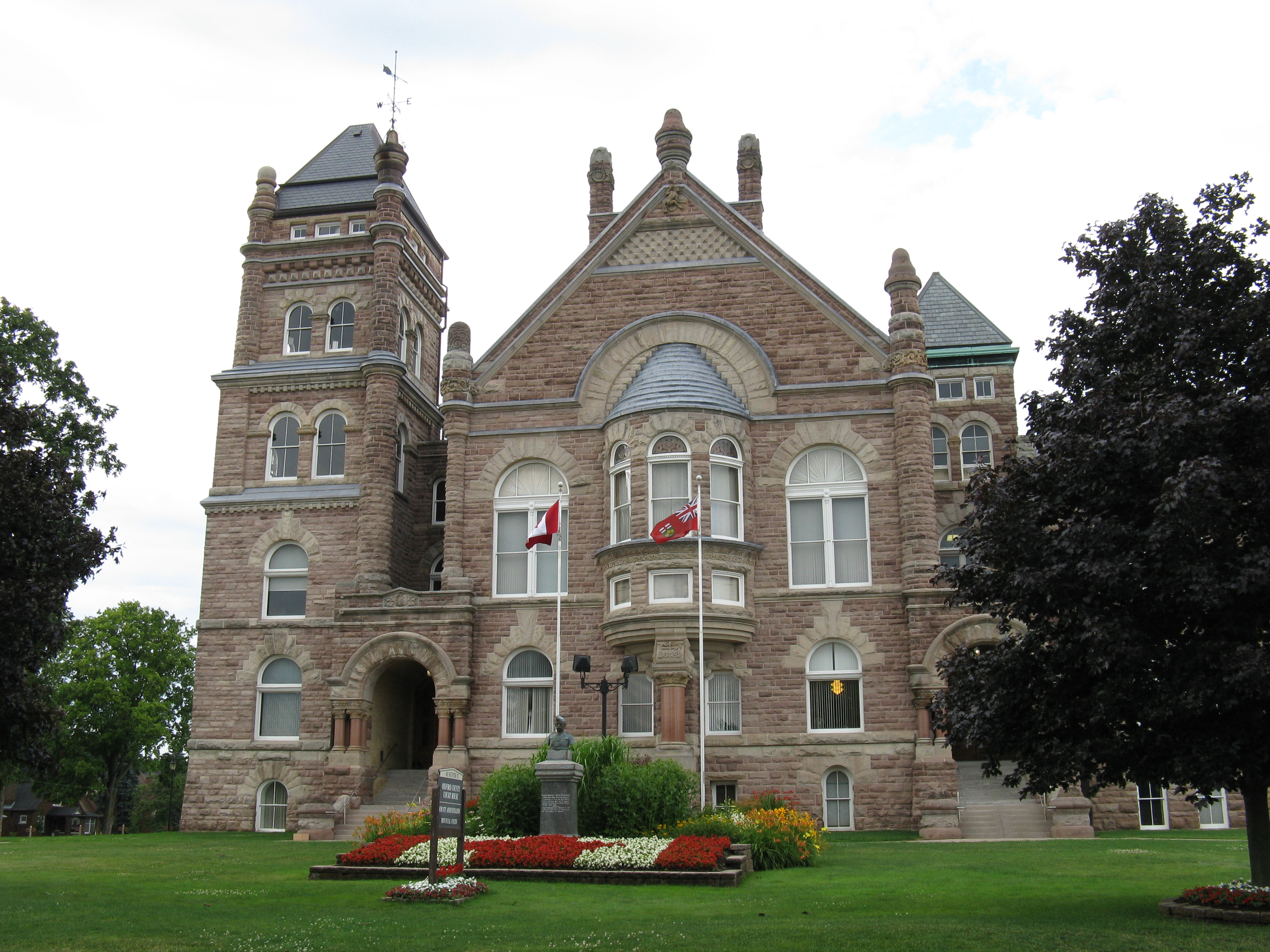
Oxford County Court House

Built in 1892 to replace a Regency predecessor of 1839, the Courthouse is a massive building of sandstone in the Richardsonian Romanesque style, with a complex roof line. The first architect was dismissed in 1890 after the walls were found to be faulty, and replaced by Cuthbertson of Woodstock and Fowler of Toronto. Monkey heads are hidden among the capitals of the red marble pillars at the two front entrances, and the monkey at the peak is said to have been carved by the contractor to represent the county council after a dispute over payment.

=== City Hall/Old Post Office ===
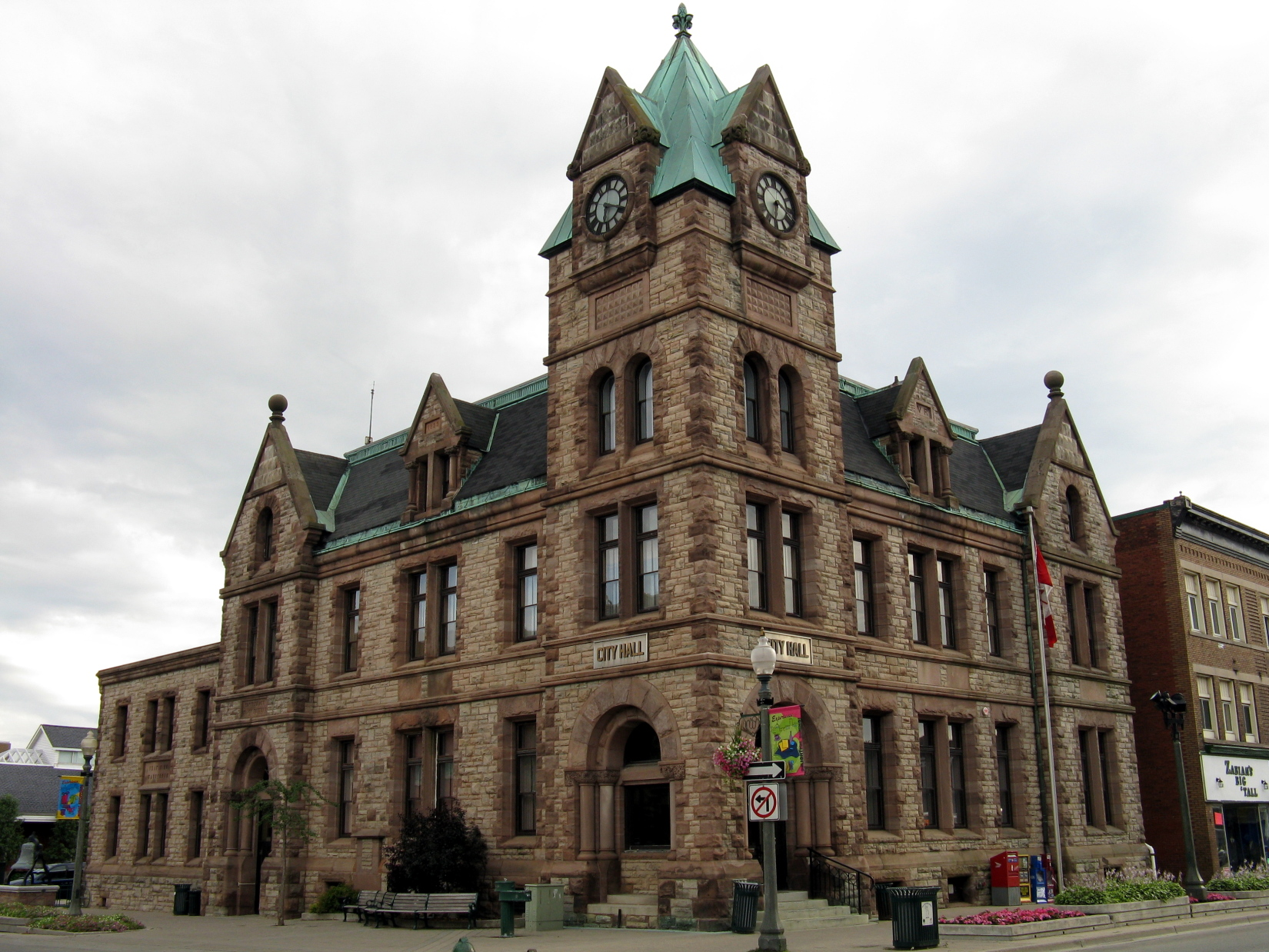
Woodstock City Hall building

The current City Hall was originally built in 1901 as a post office during the term of Alexander McClenaghan, postmaster for thirty years. Bourgue DesRivieres of Ottawa were the architects and William Hall Burns, a prominent Ottawa sculptor of the Library of Parliament, was commissioned to do the exterior stone carving. Built of warm sandstone, with decorative trim in the gables and a bold corner tower with four clocks, it was converted to municipal offices in 1968. Start, Turner, Gardhouse, Bennett, Historic Public Buildings of Woodstock, Ontario

=== Old Fire Hall ===
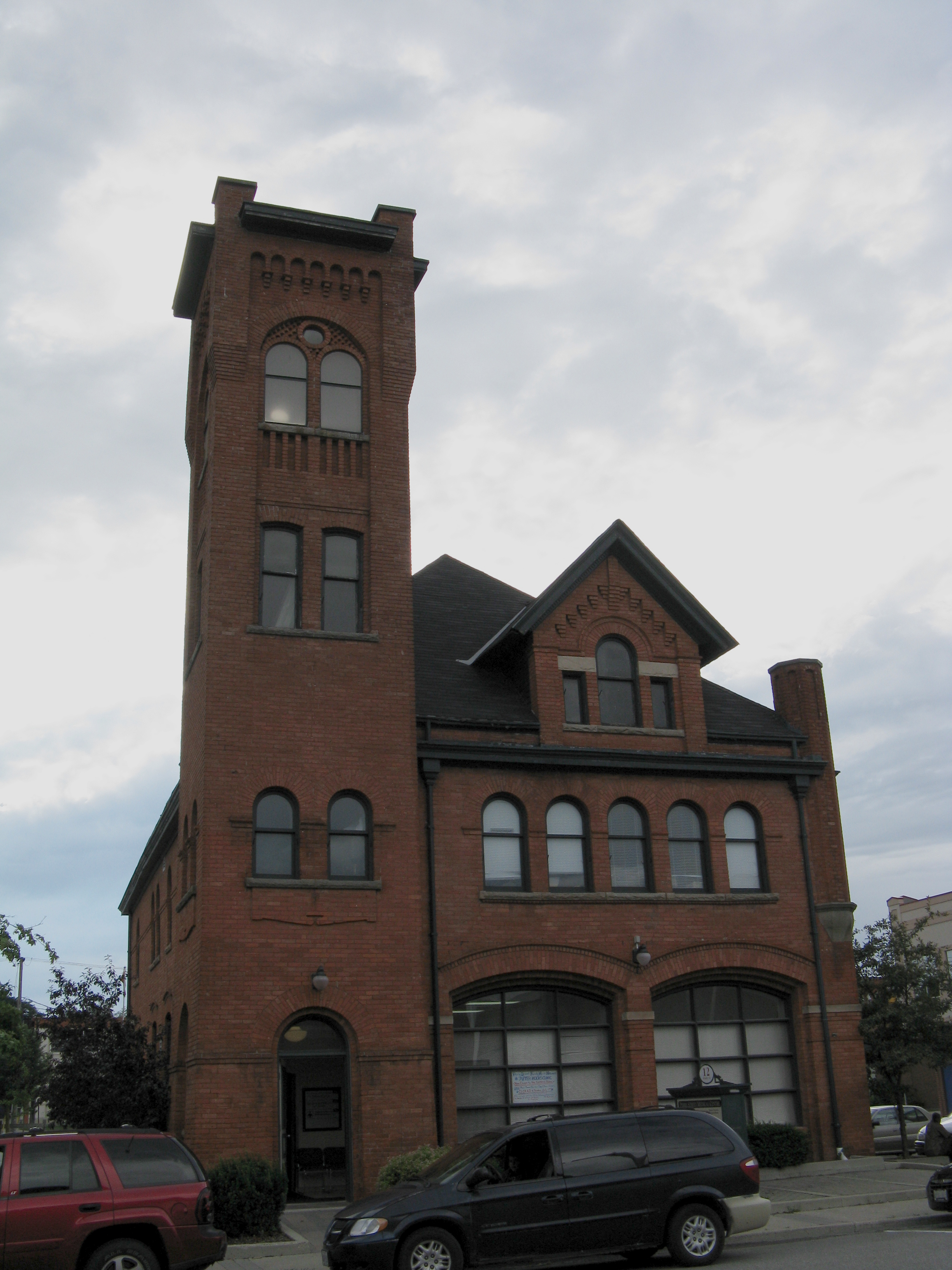
Old Perry Street Fire Hall

The Perry Street firehall was built in 1899 at a cost of $7,500 to house the horse-drawn wagons. On Saturday evenings, people would gather to see the horses rush out of their stalls at the sound of the regular 9 o'clock bell, race around the building and back themselves into the shafts ready to be harnessed by firefighters as they slid down the pole from their upstairs quarters. The firehall features a square tower with detailed brickwork at the top, and a miniature tower to the right. The tower bell used to ring for fires, curfews, and lost children, and is now mounted in Southside Park. (Start, Turner, Gardhouse, Bennett, Historic Public Buildings of Woodstock, Ontario)

=== Woodstock Armoury ===
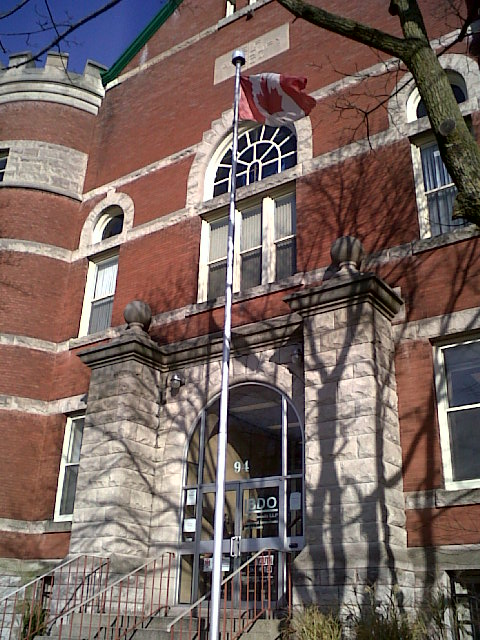
Old Armoury building

The old Armouries was erected in 1904 by Nagle and Mills of Ingersoll as the home of the Oxford Rifles until 1954. The crenelated towers give it an appearance of heavy fortification, and its architecture reveals function through its exterior form, making interesting use of stone and brick. In 1971, after being declared surplus to Department of National Defence needs, it was transformed into offices for the Oxford County Board of Education, at which times its two wrought-iron spiral staircases (valued at $3000) were sold at public auction for $250 apiece.

A stone cairn made with stones from the beach of Dieppe, where members of the Battalion participated in The Battle of Dieppe in August 1942, accounts the history of the Oxford Rifles.

=== Woodstock Via Station ===
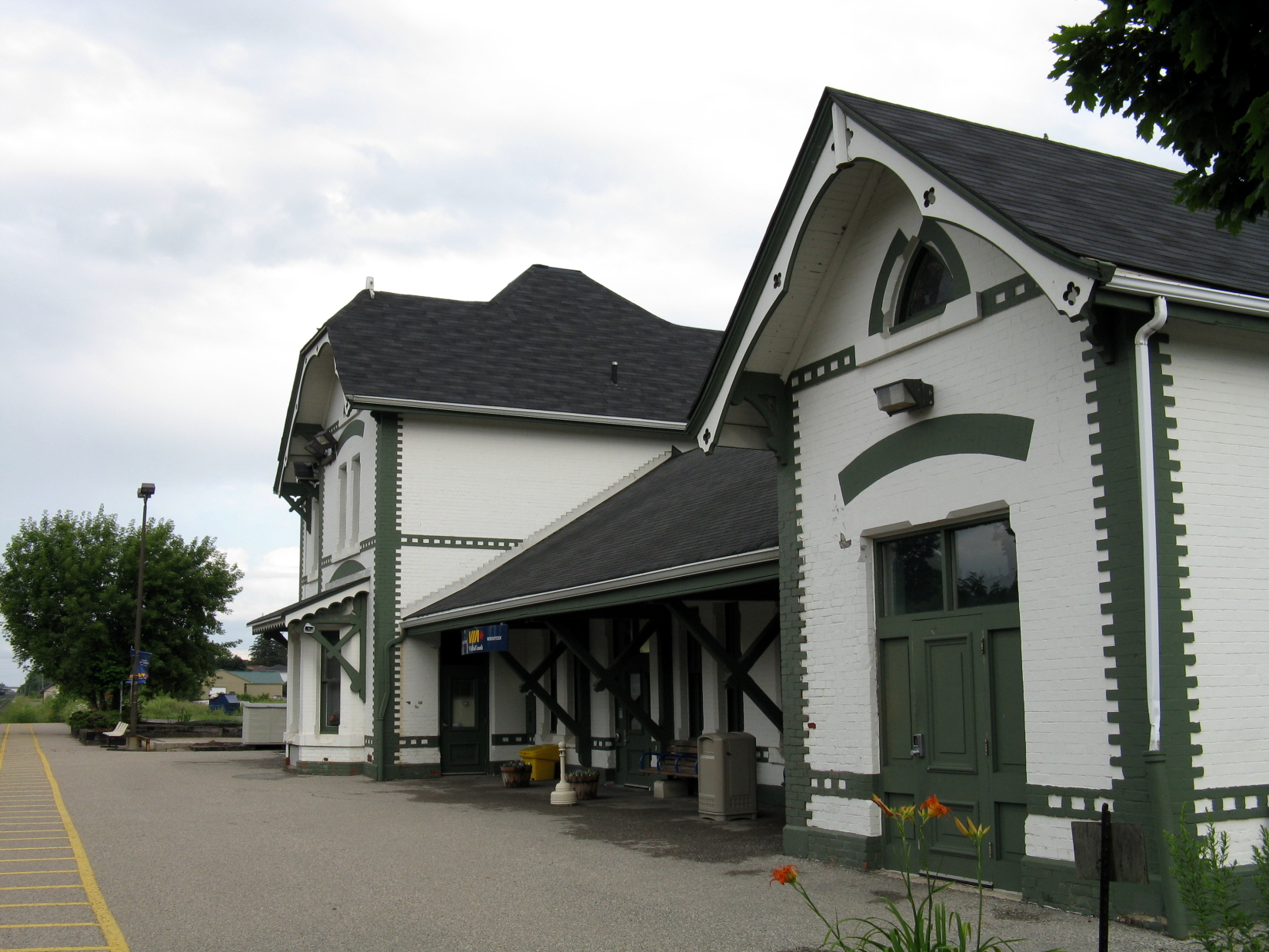
Woodstock Via Rail Station

The Grand Trunk Railway owned and operated the Woodstock trains in 1914. They would later go bankrupt and be bought out by CN. Via now resides in the heritage building once occupied by Grand Trunk.

=== Pattulo's Fountain ===
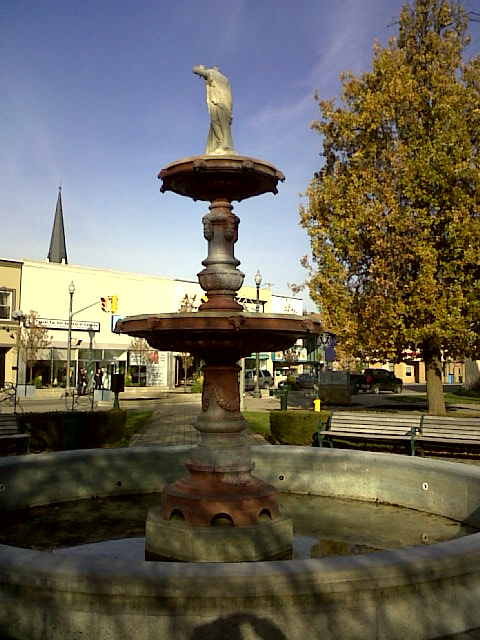
Pattulo's Fountain

This fountain sits in front of The Woodstock Museum or Old Town Hall. The fountain was erected in 1916 in honour of Andrew Pattulo, who was head of the Sentinel-Review newspaper in the early twentieth century.

=== Old Registry Building ===
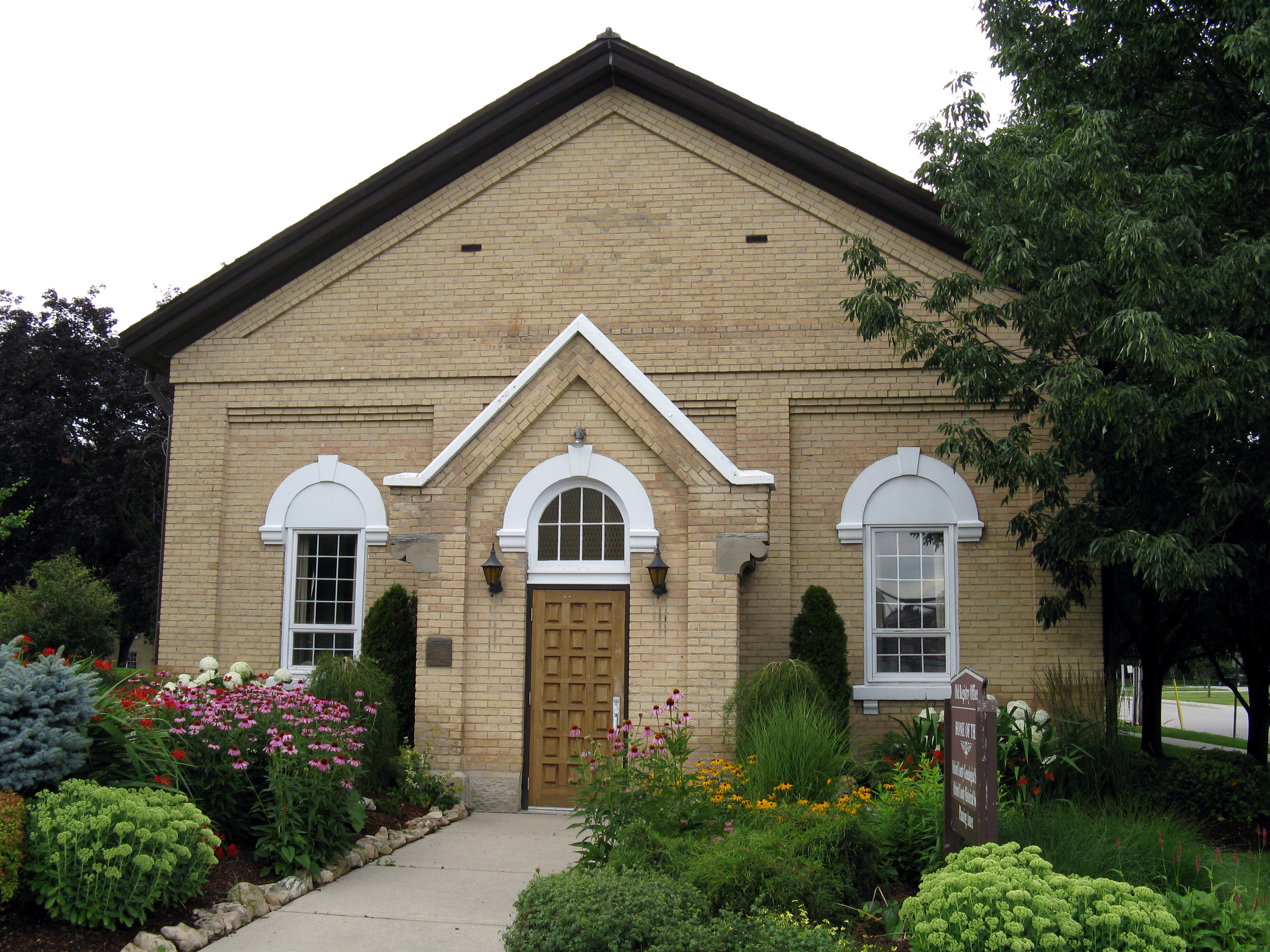
Old Registry Office

The Old Registry Office, now housing Oxford County Social Services, was constructed in 1876 to replace an earlier building on the County Square's opposite front corner, and served as a registry office until 1952. Italianate in style like the old jail, it is highlighted by semi-circular masonry over the windows carried out in the arch over the door. Its walls are two feet thick and its roof is said to be filled with sand, making the structure fireproof, and conforming to design plans common to registry offices of that era in Ontario. Start, Turner, Gardhouse, Bennett, Historic Public Buildings of Woodstock, Ontario Plaques: The first Registry office built in Oxford County was located west of here at the corner of Hunter and Light Streets, Woodstock, 1847. This building, the second Registry Office, was constructed in 1876 and remained in use until 1952. Five registrars of deeds served Oxford in their private homes and in these offices: Capt. Thomas Horner (1800–1834), James Ingersoll (1834–1886), George Patullo (1186–1922), Wallace L. MacWhinnie (1922–1950), and Ross V. Tuck (1950–1969).

=== Oxford Hotel ===
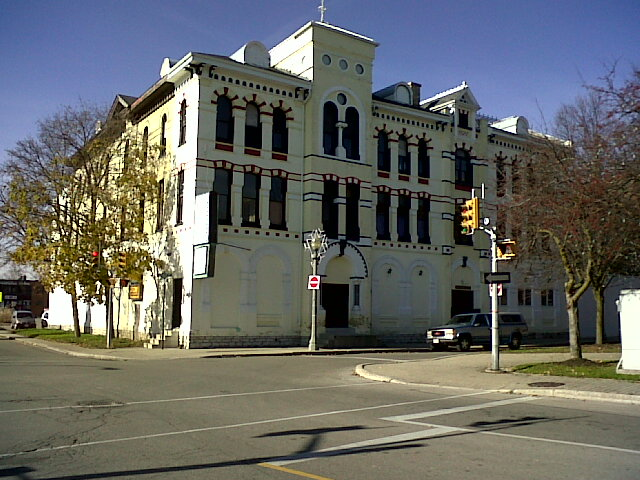
Oxford Hotel

The Oxford Hotel, located across from Market Square and the Town Hall in Woodstock, was built in 1880 as "The O'Neill House". It saw guests such as Oscar Wilde and Reginald Birchall, and later had a double purpose – it was the meeting spot for media in Birchall's trial. In 1895, the hotel saw a new owner, who named it "Oxford" and it would change hands twice more in the twentieth century. The Oxford Hotel also booked some interesting acts. In 1924, the "Human Fly", who was then all the rage across Canada and the United States, walked across the walls of Oxford's Hotel. (SR, July 21, 1924) The Hotel sits empty now and is available for purchase. There is a historical plaque on the building, recognizing its contributions to local history.

=== Captain Andrew Drew House ===
735 Rathbourne Ave. Built in 1833. Drew divided the eastern section of the town into town lots and formed the nucleus of this community. A plaque for Captain Andrew Drew, R.N., 1792–1878. Co-founder of Woodstock with Henry Vansittart. He led the loyalist forces, which destroyed the American steamer Caroline during the 1837 Rebellion.

=== Hawkin's Chapel ===
North of Park Row, west of Mill St. A movement to build a church for black people resulted in its construction in 1888. The church closed in 1985 when it was sold for a house.

=== Hugh Richardson House ===
419 Vincent St. Neo-classical style house built in 1849. The first owner, Hugh Richardson, was the presiding judge at the Louis Riel trial in 1885. Richardson was also the first reeve of Woodstock.

=== James Hay Residence ===
An Italianate-style home built in 1878. There is a lamp post from the Vansittart farm on the property. A plaque for James Hay, a well-known industrialist born in Woodstock, who was one of the founders of the Board of Trade in 1878, elected to Town Council in 1880 and Mayor between 1893 and 1894.

=== Perry-Hill Home; "House of the Valley" ===
130 Finkle St. It is the oldest house in Woodstock, built in 1819 by Dr. Perry, the first doctor and teacher in Woodstock.

=== T.L. "Carbide" Willson House ===
210 Vansittart Ave, Woodstock ON, N4S 6E9, CANADA. The home was built in 1895 by Thomas "Carbide" Willson, inventor of the first commercial calcium-carbide process for the manufacturer of acetylene gas. It was the residence of the Sisters of St. Joseph's until 1975. It's now a Guest House/B&B named Château la Motte (www.chateaulamotte.ca) owned by Alida and François Joubert. They are from South Africa, but François' family comes from the south of France (hence La Motte-d'Aiques, Provence).

=== Kyrtleglen House ===
145 Delatre Street, built in 1846, was originally owned and built by Malcolm Douglas. Malcolm married Christina Hay of the James Hay family. Douglas was the owner of the local tannery. His son built a twin of the house in town to a smaller scale. Douglas street is named after him.

== Education ==
=== Post-Secondary ===
- Fanshawe College, the city's only post-secondary institution

The campus is located at the south end of the city, offering a variety of full- and part-time programs. Fanshawe has applied for a permit to add onto their campus. The addition would double the size of the current campus and allow the institution to offer a much wider selection of programs.

=== Secondary schools ===
- School Within A College (SWAC)-Woodstock (Alternative Education)
- Woodstock Collegiate Institute
- Huron Park Secondary School
- College Avenue Secondary School
- St Mary's High School (Catholic)
- Ecole Secondaire Notre Dame

=== Elementary schools ===
- Thames Valley District School Board (Anglophone, Public)

- Algonquin Public School (1994), 634.
- Central Public School (1880s), 289.
- Eastdale Public School (1955), 278.
- Northdale Public School (1950), 264.
- Oliver Stephens Public School.
- Southside Public School (1956), 266.
- Springbank Public School (1964), 272.
- Winchester Street Public School (1963), 192. Originally D.M. Sutherland Senior Public School.
- Roch Carrier French Immersion Public School (2011). Originally Huron Park Public School (1953), renamed Hillcrest Public School (1969).

- London District Catholic School Board (Anglophone, Catholic)

- St Michael's Catholic School (1967), 410.
- Holy Family Catholic French Immersion (1996). Originally St. Mary's High School (1981), 192.
- St Patrick's Catholic School (unknown), 249.

- Conseil scolaire catholique Providence (Francophone, Catholic)

- École élémentaire Sainte-Marguerite-Bourgeoys (2011, current Bristol St. location). Originally located at 345 Huron St.

- Private

- Woodstock Christian School (1960s).

== Sports and recreation ==
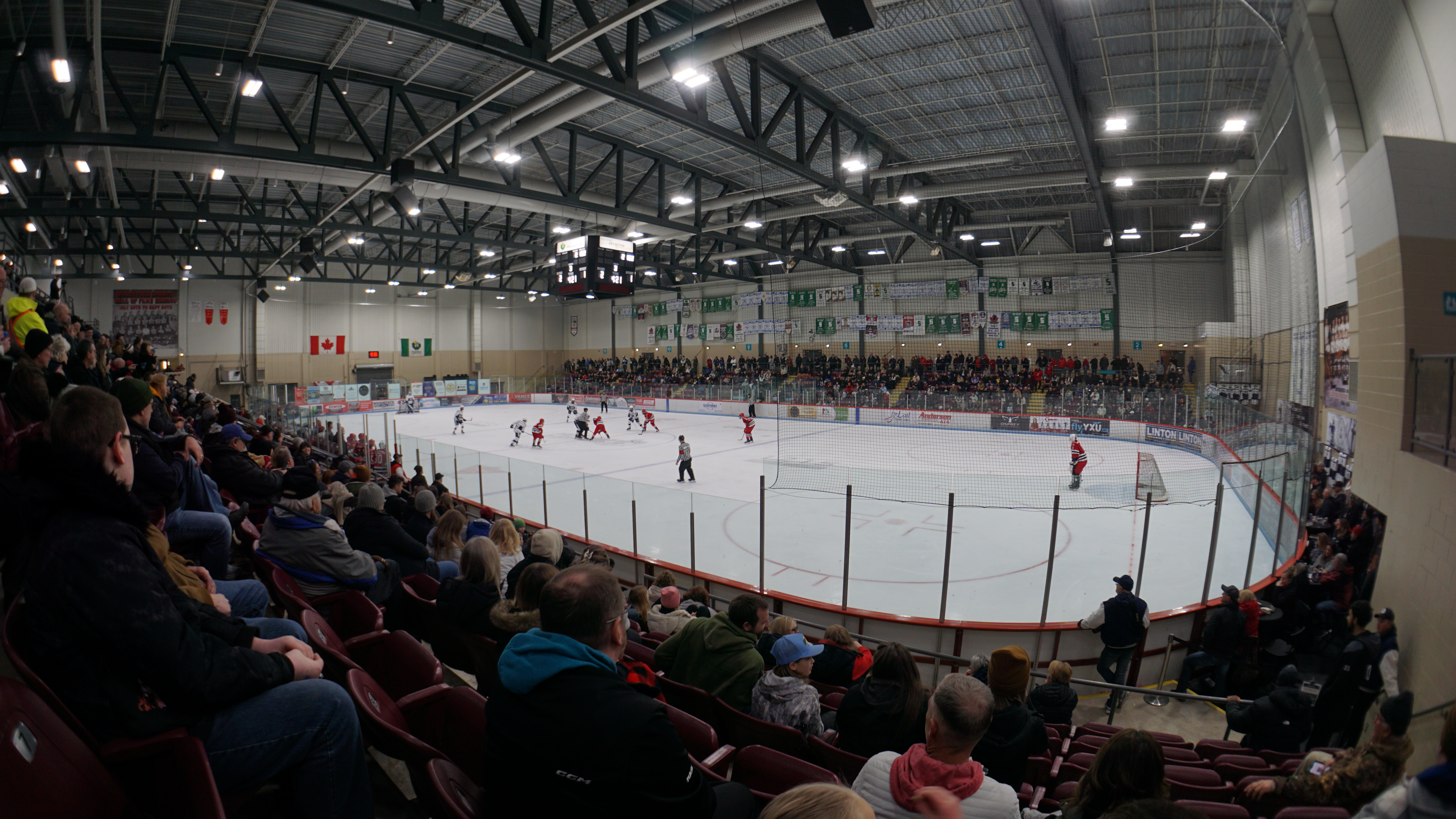
Woodstock Navy Vets game

Woodstock has several parks and gardens. Most notable is Southside Park, which has a playground, baseball diamonds, public washrooms, soccer fields, gardens, and a new Skatepark. It also has a large pond, and many walking trails. Tip O'Neill Field at Southside Park is home for the Woodstock Rangers OBA Junior baseball team.

At the North End of the city is Roth Park and the Gordon Pittock Conservation Area, which stretch along the shores Gordon Pittock Reservoir, an artificial lake created by the construction of the Pittock Dam. This park contains a playground and several kilometers of walking, running, and biking trails. There is also a disc golf course.

The Woodstock Dragon Boat Club also uses the Gordon Pittock Reservoir as their home. They are a dragon boat community consisting of both adult and junior teams.

Woodstock has two ice rinks, two at the Reeves Community Complex at the south end of the city, and one at the fairgrounds in the central region. Southwood Arena at the Community Complex is home for the Woodstock Navy-Vets OHA Junior hockey team.

Woodstock also has a roller derby team called the Woodstock Warriors. Woodstock roller derby was founded in 2011.

The Woodstock Soccer Club constructed an indoor turf field house and outdoor soccer park in the northwestern corner of the city, at the former site of the Oxford Regional Centre. The City now owns this facility, known as Cowan Park. The city has one indoor swimming pool, Southside Aquatic Centre; the local YMCA and Lions Pools closed.

The city's Craigowan (Oxford) Golf Club is a private facility, dates from 1909, and is on a different site from that used by the current course. It has hosted provincial championships, and in 2014 staged the Canadian Women's Amateur Championship.

== Natural areas and parks ==
=== Burgess Park ===
Oxford Road 59 N. 28.5 hectares (70 acres) of naturalized area outside of city limits. Part of the Upper Thame River Conservation Authority.

=== Harry Roth Park ===
Huron St. 10 hectares (25 acres) for passive recreations and fishing. Part of the Upper Thames River Conversation Authority.

=== Homer Brown ===
Pavey St. 3 hectares (7.4 acres) of parkland.

=== McIntosh Park ===
Butler St. This park, with an area of 4.5 hectares (11 acres), was named after the former operators of a wood and coal business and later an ice factory. It is located on the former site of McIntosh Mill Pond.

=== Gordon Pittock Conservation Area and Dam ===
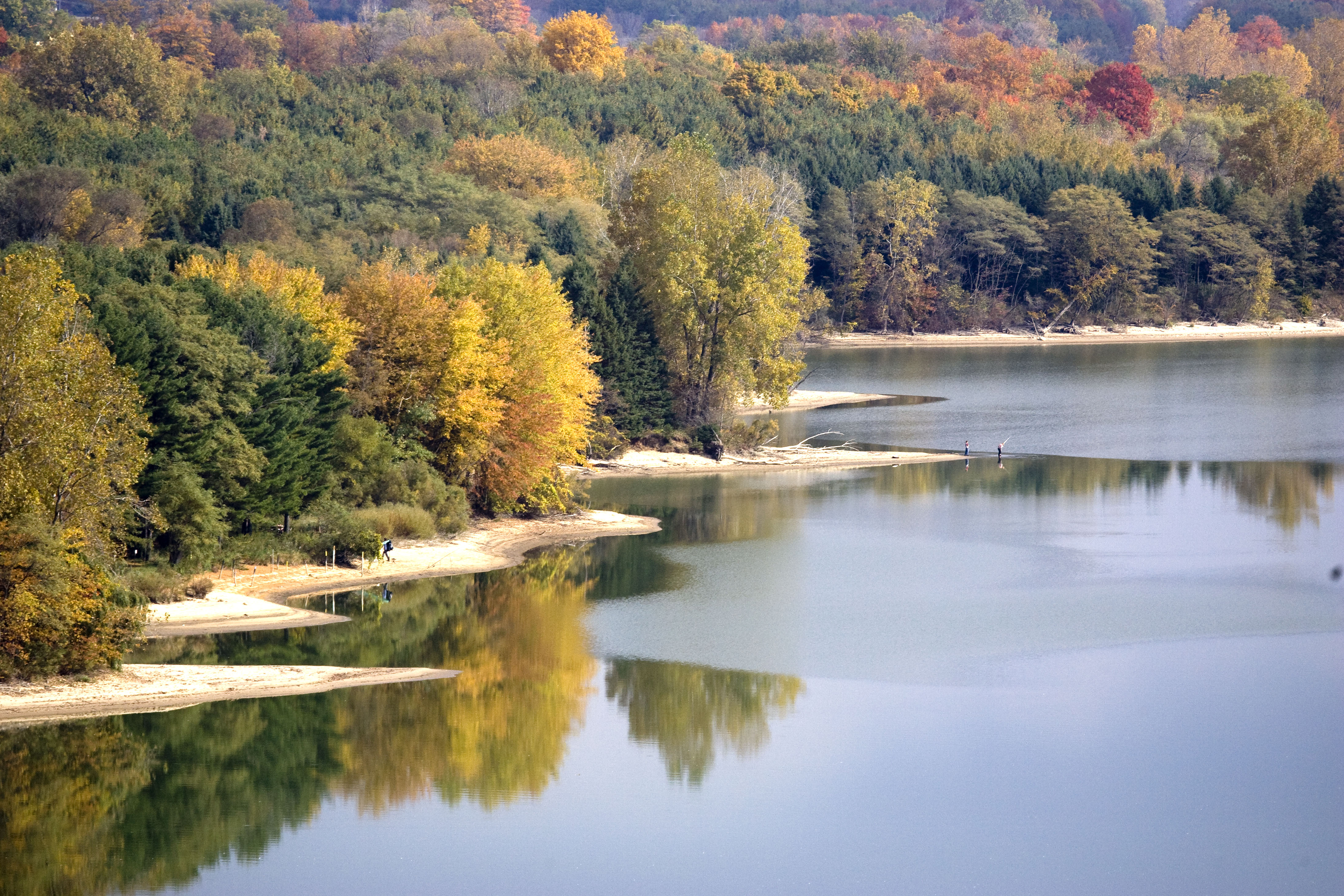
The Gordon Pittock Conservation Area, at the northeastern edge of the city

725138 Pittock Park Rd. Passive recreation and fishing. Hunting is restricted. It is managed by the Upper Thames River Conservation Authority. It is on the shores of a reservoir created by Pittock Dam, which was completed in 1967. The cost of the dam and land base at that time was close to $6 million. Present annual maintenance costs are about $40,000.

The Pittock Dam is designed for both flood control and flow augmentation purposes. It is designed to benefit water quality downstream during dry summer conditions and provide year-round flood control capability to protect downstream communities.

== Industry ==
=== Toyota plant ===
In June 2005, Toyota announced plans to build a new, $1.1 billion CAD automobile assembly plant in Woodstock on a 1,000-acre (4.0 km^{2}) undeveloped site in the city's northeast end. The plant was expected to employ 2000 people and begin full production of the Toyota RAV4 SUV in November 2008, at the rate of 150,000 a year. However, because of slowing car sales and bleeding market share to South Korean marques, Toyota cut production by 50% to 75,000 a year and reduced the work force 40% to 1,200 people. The other 800 workers are expected to be recalled when (if ever) car sales increase. It was the first new auto assembly plant to be built in Canada in two decades.

In January 2010 the second shift was added and production increased to 150,000 units per year. In 2012 they began production of the all-electric RAV4 EV in conjunction with Tesla motors. In 2013, the combined production of the RAV4 and RAV4 EV will increase to 200,000 units per year and an additional 400 workers well be added. This will bring the total work force at the Woodstock facility to 2,400.

=== Hino Motors Canada Ltd. ===
In early March 2006, Hino Motors, a Toyota Motor Co. subsidiary, announced that it will be the first Japanese truck manufacturer to build its vehicles in Canada with a new Woodstock plant slated to begin production in April 2006, in the former General Seating plant in the Pattullo Ridge Business Park near Highway 401 and Highway 59.

The $3 million, 11,000-square-metre (120,000 sq ft) plant will employ 45 and assemble 2,000 trucks a year when it begins production.

In late November 2008 the Hino Motors automotive plant was completed.

=== Other industries ===
Woodstock is also home to industries:

- General Motors National Parts Distribution Warehouse, with approximately 1,000,000 square feet of floor space, it is the largest of its kind in Canada (est. 1976)
- Vuteq Canada, an automotive supply company to General Motors and Toyota and employs 450.
- Toyota Boshoku, an automotive supply company to Toyota.
- Tigercat Industries, a forestry and logging equipment manufacturer.
- RWF Bron, a heavy equipment manufacturer.
- Woodstock Precision Machining, a precision machine part supplier.
- Kelsey Hayes, an automotive supply company for Ford.
- Firestone, a textile/tire manufacturing company since 1936 (opened as Oxford Knitting Mills c. 1906 and acquired as Firestone Cotton Mills; facility closed in 2019)
- Agribrand Purina, pet food/feed manufacturing and distribution centre
- Green Metals Canada Inc, Recycling company service Toyota group companies
- Harvan Manufacturing Ltd, Manufacturer of gears, shafts, valve components, torsion bars, stabilizer bars, suspension control arms and drive components.

== Transportation ==
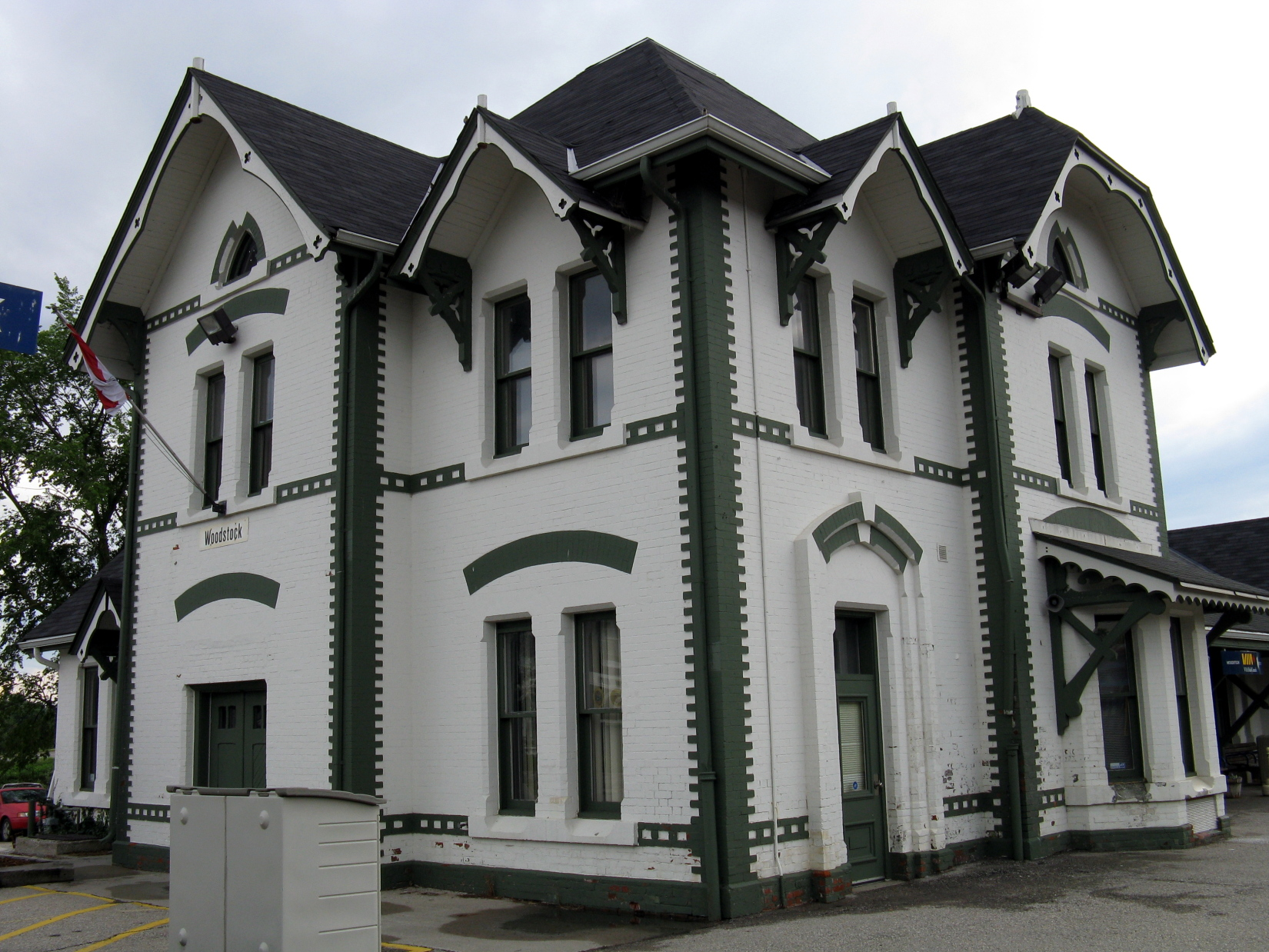
Woodstock's Via Rail station

Woodstock Transit provides bus service on weekdays and Saturdays.

For intercity travel Via Rail operates a train station in the city, offering Quebec City-Windsor corridor service to Toronto, Windsor, and points in between.

Highway 401 runs along the southern edge of the city, and its western junction with Highway 403 is located in the extreme south-east. Woodstock is centred on the intersection of the former Highway 59 and Highway 2, now Oxford Road 59 and Oxford Road 2.

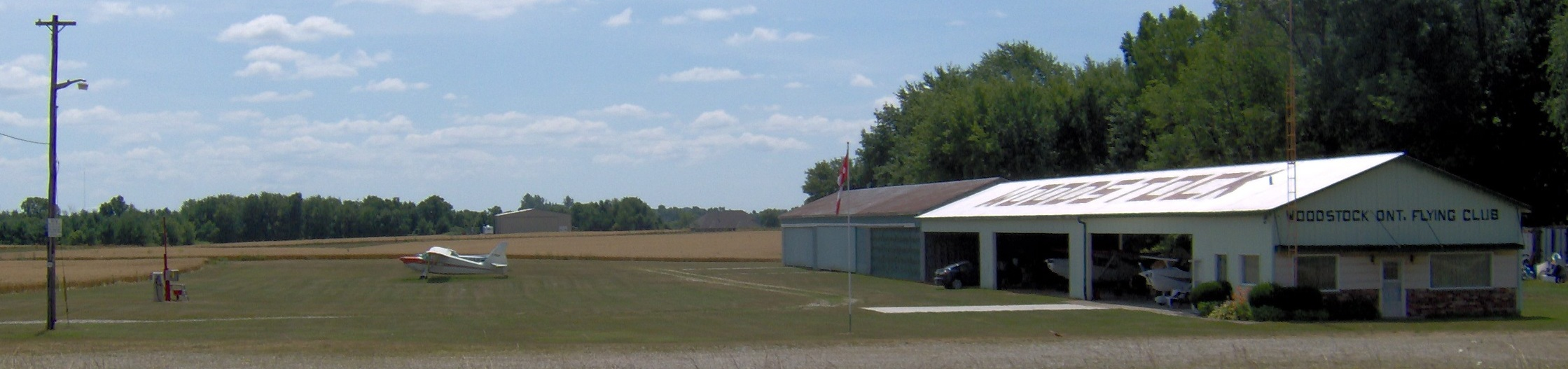
Woodstock Airport

Woodstock Airport has a grass airstrip and is home to the local flying club. It is located 2.5 nautical miles (4.6 km) west of Woodstock. The nearest airport with scheduled flights is London International Airport, 40 km to the west on Highway 2 (Oxford Road 2). The nearest major airport is Toronto Pearson International Airport, 123 km to the east.

== Media ==
Woodstock has one daily newspaper owned by Postmedia Network, the Woodstock Sentinel-Review.

There are three licensed FM radio stations:

- FM 94.3 - CJFH, "Hope FM" :Christian music
- FM 103.9 - CKDK "Country 104": Country music
- FM 104.7 - CIHR, "Heart FM": adult contemporary

There is one licensed over-the-air television station in Woodstock:

OTA virtual channel (PSIP)	OTA actual channel	Call sign	Network	Notes
31.1	31 (UHF)	CITY-DT-2	City	Rebroadcaster of CITY-DT

Woodstock was used as a filming location and stood in for the fictional town of Matheson Massachusetts in the third season of the hit Netflix original series Locke & Key (2020-2022)

Woodstock is also served by media from nearby London, Ontario.

== Notable people ==
- Alfred Apps (born 1957), businessman and politician
- Reginald Birchall (1866–1890), British conman hanged in Woodstock
- Catherine Bond-Mills (born 1967), Olympic heptathlete
- Mary Bothwell (1900–1970s), opera singer and painter
- Joseph W. Boyle (1867–1923), Canadian businessman
- Ross Butler (1907–1995), painter
- Florence Carlyle (1864–1923), painter
- Don Coles (1927–2017), poet
- Allie Goodbun, dancer, actress, and showgirl at the Moulin Rouge
- Ted Long (born 1955), retired WHA player
- Jake Muzzin (born 1989), professional ice hockey player
- David Naylor (born 1954), doctor and academic
- Duff Pattullo (1873–1956), premier of British Columbia
- Andrea Roth (born 1967), actress
- Frank Sandercock (1887–1942), president of the Canadian Amateur Hockey Association
- Gordon Tottle (1925– 1987), professional ice hockey player
- Garth Turner (born 1949), business journalist
- Elizabeth Wettlaufer (born 1967), nurse and serial killer
- Bob White (1935–2017), Canadian Auto Workers president
- Jeff Zehr (born 1978), professional hockey player
- Kevin Zegers (born 1984), actor and model
